= National Register of Historic Places listings in Jefferson County, Mississippi =

Location of Jefferson County in Mississippi

This is a list of the National Register of Historic Places listings in Jefferson County, Mississippi.

This is intended to be a complete list of the properties and districts on the National Register of Historic Places in Jefferson County, Mississippi, United States. Latitude and longitude coordinates are provided for many National Register properties and districts; these locations may be seen together in a map.

There are 26 properties and districts listed on the National Register in the county.

This National Park Service list is complete through NPS recent listings posted October 30, 2026.

== Current listings ==
	Name on the Register	Image	Date listed	Location	City or town	Description
1	Blantonia Plantation House		March 4, 1993 (#93000145)	3 miles east of Red Lick on an unmarked road off Mississippi Highway 552; 31°48′06″N 90°55′55″W	Lorman	
2	Cedar Grove Place		March 28, 1979 (#79001317)	Mississippi Highway 553; 31°42′36″N 91°14′39″W	Church Hill	
3	China Grove		April 3, 1980 (#80002254)	West of Lorman off U.S. Route 61; 31°49′43″N 91°03′50″W	Lorman	
4	Christ Church	Christ Church	May 6, 1977 (#77000790)	Mississippi Highway 553; 31°42′54″N 91°14′17″W	Church Hill	
5	Church Hill Rural Historic District		September 8, 2000 (#00001054)	Mississippi Highway 553 and Church Hill Rd., 1 mile south of Christ Episcopal Church; 31°42′27″N 91°14′37″W	Natchez	
6	Coon Box Fork Bridge		May 23, 1979 (#79003429)	Coon Box Rd. 31°47′25″N 91°05′37″W	Coon Box	Destroyed in 2015.
7	Hays House		March 10, 2009 (#09000111)	18800 U.S. Route 61, S. 31°49′28″N 91°02′54″W	Lorman	
8	Hughes-Clark House		August 3, 1987 (#87001260)	221 Poindexter St. 31°42′40″N 91°03′36″W	Fayette	
9	Jefferson Chapel A.M.E. Church and Cemetery		January 24, 2019 (#100003343)	291 Chapel Hill Rd. 31°40′45″N 91°14′04″W	Natchez	
10	Laurietta		November 24, 1980 (#80002253)	South of Fayette off Mississippi Highway 33; 31°40′45″N 91°04′56″W	Fayette	
11	Mud Island Creek Complex (22JE508 and 22JE513)	Mud Island Creek Complex (22JE508 and 22JE513)	June 29, 1989 (#89000447)	Address restricted	Lorman	
12	Oak Grove		February 22, 1979 (#79001318)	Mississippi Highway 553; 31°42′42″N 91°14′22″W	Church Hill	
13	Old Hill Place Bridge		May 23, 1979 (#79003430)	Hill Rd. 31°40′09″N 91°10′52″W	Fayette	
14	Pecan Grove		March 13, 1980 (#80002252)	North of Church Hill off Mississippi Highway 553; 31°44′06″N 91°13′51″W	Church Hill	
15	Poplar Hill Grade School		March 10, 2010 (#10000064)	3080 Poplar Hill Rd. 31°45′50″N 91°05′37″W	Fayette	
16	Hystercine Rankin House		September 25, 2025 (#100012287)	341 Rankin Road; 31°51′11″N 90°59′15″W	Lorman vicinity	
17	Richland		July 5, 1984 (#84002227)	Off Mississippi Highway 553; 31°45′07″N 91°11′54″W	Church Hill	
18	Rodney Center Historic District	Rodney Center Historic District	August 29, 1980 (#80002255)	Northwest of Lorman; 31°51′40″N 91°11′52″W	Lorman	
19	Rodney Presbyterian Church	Rodney Presbyterian Church	February 6, 1973 (#73001018)	West of Alcorn in the village of Rodney; 31°51′46″N 91°11′59″W	Alcorn	
20	Rosswood		December 8, 1978 (#78001606)	East of Lorman on Mississippi Highway 552; 31°49′08″N 91°00′43″W	Lorman	
21	Springfield Plantation	Springfield Plantation	November 23, 1971 (#71000454)	8 miles west of Fayette off Mississippi Highway 553; 31°44′46″N 91°11′35″W	Fayette	Where Andrew Jackson married Rachel Donelson Robards.
22	Truly House		May 13, 2021 (#100006555)	93 Gilchrist St. 31°42′44″N 91°03′35″W	Fayette	
23	Union Church Presbyterian Church	Union Church Presbyterian Church	July 18, 1979 (#79001322)	Mississippi Highway 28; 31°40′58″N 90°47′26″W	Union Church	
24	Woodland Plantation	Woodland Plantation	November 27, 1978 (#78001605)	South of Church Hill on Mississippi Highway 553; 31°40′00″N 91°13′54″W	Church Hill	
25	Wyolah Plantation		May 30, 1985 (#85001168)	Off Mississippi Highway 553; 31°42′10″N 91°14′47″W	Church Hill	
26	Youngblood Bridge		May 23, 1979 (#79003428)	Youngblood Rd. 31°38′00″N 90°48′51″W	Union Church	

== Former listings ==
	Name on the Register	Image	Date listed	Date removed	Location	City or town	Description
1	Laurel Hill		January 29, 1973 (#73001019)	January 27, 1983	2 miles southeast of Rodney	Rodney	Destroyed by fire on November 11, 1982

== See also ==
- List of National Historic Landmarks in Mississippi
- National Register of Historic Places listings in Mississippi
