= Mississippi Highway 553 =

State highway in Mississippi

Mississippi Highway 553

Route information
- Maintained by MDOT and City of Fayette
- Length: 23.041 mi (37.081 km)
- Existed: c. 1956–present

Major junctions
- South end: US 61 in Stanton
- US 61 in Fayette
- North end: Harriston Road in Harriston

Location
- Country: United States
- State: Mississippi
- Counties: Adams, Jefferson

Highway system
- Mississippi State Highway System; Interstate; US; State
← MS 552	→ MS 554

Mississippi Highway 553 (MS 553) is a state highway in Adams and Jefferson counties in southwestern Mississippi. The highway runs from U.S. Route 61 (US 61) in Stanton, loops to the west around US 61 and the Natchez Trace Parkway to Fayette, and extends further north to Harriston. Within Jefferson County, MS 553 passes numerous locations on the National Register of Historic Places.

== Route description ==
The highway begins at the intersection of the divided US 61 (part of the Great River Road) and State Park Road in Stanton, within the northern portion of Adams County. State Park Road leads south to Natchez State Park. MS 553 heads north, passing a couple of houses, and wooded areas. About 3/4 mile (1.2 km) from its start, MS 553 intersects the Natchez Trace Parkway at an at-grade junction. Just north of this intersection, MS 553 makes a sharp curve to the east with a side road providing access to the Emerald Mound site. Crossing into Jefferson County, the state highway winds its way north through wooded areas. The road eventually reaches Church Hill home to many nationally recognized historic places including Cedar Grove Place, Christ Church, and Oak Grove. MS 553 heads northeast past more churches and some open fields before curving to the east.

After this turn, MS 553 passes two additional historic sites: Richland and Springfield Plantation. The road crosses Coles Creek and again intersects the Natchez Trace Parkway, this time at a grade-separated one-quadrant interchange. Continuing southeast, the road passes through wooded areas until it reaches the city limits of Fayette at its second intersection with US 61. The intersection is set up as a superstreet intersection, through traffic along MS 553 must utilize crossovers along US 61 about 1/2 mile (0.80 km) from this intersection. MS 553 heads into the city center along Rodney Road. State maintenance of the highway temporarily ends just before its intersection with Main Street. MS 553 turns north onto Main Street heading through the city's business district. At Harriston Road, MS 553 turns off Main Street and state maintenance resumes. Heading past numerous homes, it heads east away from the city and begins a slow curve to the north. MS 553 ends at the intersection of Harriston Road and Old Harriston Road (Old Highway 61) in the community of Harriston.

== History ==
MS 553 first appeared on state maps in 1956 however references to it was referenced in construction bids dating back to 1955. The highway only consisted of the segment from Stanton to Fayette, with the portion from Church Hill to Fayette being hard-surfaced. By 1958, the highway was extended to Harriston. In 1960, MS 553 was legislated further east to Dennis Crossroads at MS 552, however this portion remained a county road. It was trimmed back to its Harriston terminus by 1967.

== Major junctions ==
County	Location	mi	km	Destinations	Notes
Adams	Stanton	0.000	0.000	US 61 / Great River Road / State Park Road – Vicksburg, Natchez, Natchez State Park	Southern terminus
Adams		0.763	1.228	Natchez Trace Parkway	
Jefferson		13.080	21.050	Natchez Trace Parkway	Quadrant interchange
Jefferson	Fayette	20.231	32.559	US 61 / Great River Road – Vicksburg, Natchez	Superstreet intersection
Jefferson	Harriston	23.041	37.081	Harriston Road / Old Harriston Road	Northern terminus
1.000 mi = 1.609 km; 1.000 km = 0.621 mi
