= List of plantations in Mississippi =

This is a list of plantations and/or plantation houses in the U.S. state of Mississippi that are National Historic Landmarks, listed on the National Register of Historic Places, listed on a heritage register, or are otherwise significant for their history, association with significant events or people, or their architecture and design.

Color key	Historic register listing
	National Historic Landmark
	National Register of Historic Places
	Contributing property to a National Register of Historic Places historic district
	Not listed on national or state register

NRHP reference number	Name	Image	Locality	County	Notes
	Annandale Plantation		Madison; 32.51545°N 90.18557°W	Madison	Built from 1857 to 1859 by Margaret Louisa Thompson Johnstone. It burned down in 1924.
74001047	Auburn	1936 HABS photo	Natchez; 31.54505°N 91.39286°W	Adams	
71000448	Beauvoir	Beauvoir	Biloxi; 30.39250°N 88.86278°W	Harrison	The last residence of Jefferson and Varina Davis.
72000702	Belmont Plantation		Wayside; 33.169°N 91.159°W	Washington	The mansion was built in 1857 by W.W. Worthington.
78001576	Bedford Plantation		Natchez	Adams	
93000145	Blantonia		Lorman	Jefferson	
	Brierfield Plantation		Davis Bend; 32.15320°N 91.12094°W	Warren	Built 1847 by Jefferson Davis adjacent to his older brother's Hurricane Plantation; destroyed by fire in 1931.
83000949	Cherry Grove Plantation		Natchez	Adams	
82003088	Cedar Grove		Natchez; 31.42917°N 91.29582°W	Adams	
	Cedar Grove		Benton; 32.80215°N 90.23308°W	Yazoo	Home to John Sharp Williams
82003089	China Grove Plantation		Lorman, Mississippi	Jefferson	Built in 1826 by Willis McDonald (a Revolutionary War veteran)
80002193	Cliffs Plantation		Natchez	Adams	
85002721	Clifton		Howard	Holmes	
87000543	Desert Plantation		Woodville	Wilkinson	
72000684	Dunleith		Natchez; 31.54971°N 91.39914°W	Adams	
77000786	Evergreen Plantation		Grenada	Grenada	
82003121	Forest Home		Centreville	Wilkinson	
80002229	Forestdale Plantation		Pachuta, Mississippi	Clarke	
79003380	Glen Mary		Natchez, Mississippi	Adams	
89002322	Glenfield Plantation		Natchez	Adams	Built in two distinct architectural periods 1797-1840s, this English Gothic estate rest on the original 150 acres Spanish land grant and witnessed a civil war skirmish on the grounds with a bullet hole through the original door denoting this fact.
99000499	Glenwild		Grenada	Grenada	
96001313	Holly Grove		Bolton	Hinds	
	Homewood Plantation	Homewood	Natchez	Adams	Built from 1855 to 1860 by William S. Balfour, son of William L. Balfour, and his wife Catherine Hunt, daughter of David Hunt. Burned in 1940.
	Hurricane Plantation		Davis Bend; 32.16681°N 91.14816°W	Warren	Built 1827 by Joseph Davis, older brother of Jefferson Davis. All primary structures except for the library pavilion (pictured) were burned in 1862 by Federal troops.
78001581	Lansdowne	Lansdowne	Natchez; 31.584444°N 91.363056°W	Adams	Built in 1852-53 by George Matthews Marshall, son of Levin R. Marshall, and his wife Charlotte Hunt, daughter of David Hunt. Often open for tours.
82000569	Laurel Hill Plantation		Natchez	Adams	
91001893	Lenoir Plantation House	Lenoir	Prairie	Monroe	
86000331	Lochinvar		Pontotoc; 34°12′56″N 89°0′22″W		
96000180	Long Moss		Canton	Madison	
69000079	Longwood	Longwood	Natchez; 31.53667°N 91.40472°W	Adams	
07000648	McGehee Plantation		Senatobia		
96000189	Theodore L. McGehee Plantation House		Summit		
82003101	McNair Plantation		Raymond		
01000946	Meadow Woods Plantation House		Starkville		
74002253	Melrose	Melrose	Natchez; 31.54317°N 91.38298°W	Adams	
82004630	Miller Plantation		Olive Branch		
73001001	Monmouth	1972 HABS photo	Natchez; 31.55283°N 91.38615°W	Adams	
02000354	Dossey A. Outlaw Plantation		Starkville, Mississippi		
80002227	Lang Plantation		Langsdale		
94001305	Prairie Plantation		Clarksdale		
80002221	Riverside Plantation		Enterprise	Clarke	
83000970	Salisbury Plantation			Wilkinson	
	Smedes Plantation		Onward	Sharkey	
00001400	Sedgewood Plantation		Canton, Mississippi		
89000207	Selma Plantation		Natchez	Adams	
71000454	Springfield Plantation		Fayette	Jefferson	
73001004	Waverley	Waverley	West Point; 33.57103°N 88.50023°W	Clay	
	Weir Springs		Grenada; 33.80543°N 89.70376°W	Grenada	1840, Knight-Weir, demolished
71000447	Windsor		Port Gibson	Claiborne	Ruins of a plantation house built 1859–61 for Smith Coffee Daniell II. It was three and a half stories high, then topped by a large cupola. It was one of the largest antebellum mansions ever built in the South. It burned down on February 17, 1890.
78001605	Woodland Plantation		Church Hill	Jefferson	
	Woodlawn Plantation		Rodney	Jefferson	Built circa 1813 for David Hunt as his home plantation. Hunt and his children eventually built a large inventory of plantations (including Homewood and Lansdowne) centered on Woodlawn.
85001168	Wyolah Plantation		Church Hill	Jefferson	

== See also ==
- List of plantations in the United States
