= Richland (Church Hill, Mississippi) =

Historic house in Mississippi, United States

- U.S. National Register of Historic Places
- Location within Mississippi Location within the United States
- Nearest city: Church Hill, Mississippi
- Coordinates: 31°45′7″N 91°11′54″W
- Area: 8.3 acres (3.4 ha)
- Built: 1845
- Architectural style: Greek Revival
- NRHP reference No.: 84002227
- Added to NRHP: July 5, 1984

Richland is a historic building located in Church Hill, Jefferson County, Mississippi.

== Location ==
It is located off the Mississippi Highway 553.

== Overview ==
It was built in the 1840s by Robert Cox. His wife has inherited the land from her grandfather, Colonel Thomas M. Green, Jr. (1758–1813), the owner of the Springfield Plantation in Fayette, Mississippi. The architectural style is Greek Revival. It is white, and made of bricks and timber. The front door has Corinthian pilasters on each side.

It has been listed on the National Register of Historic Places since July 5, 1984.
