= Church Hill, Mississippi =

- Unincorporated community
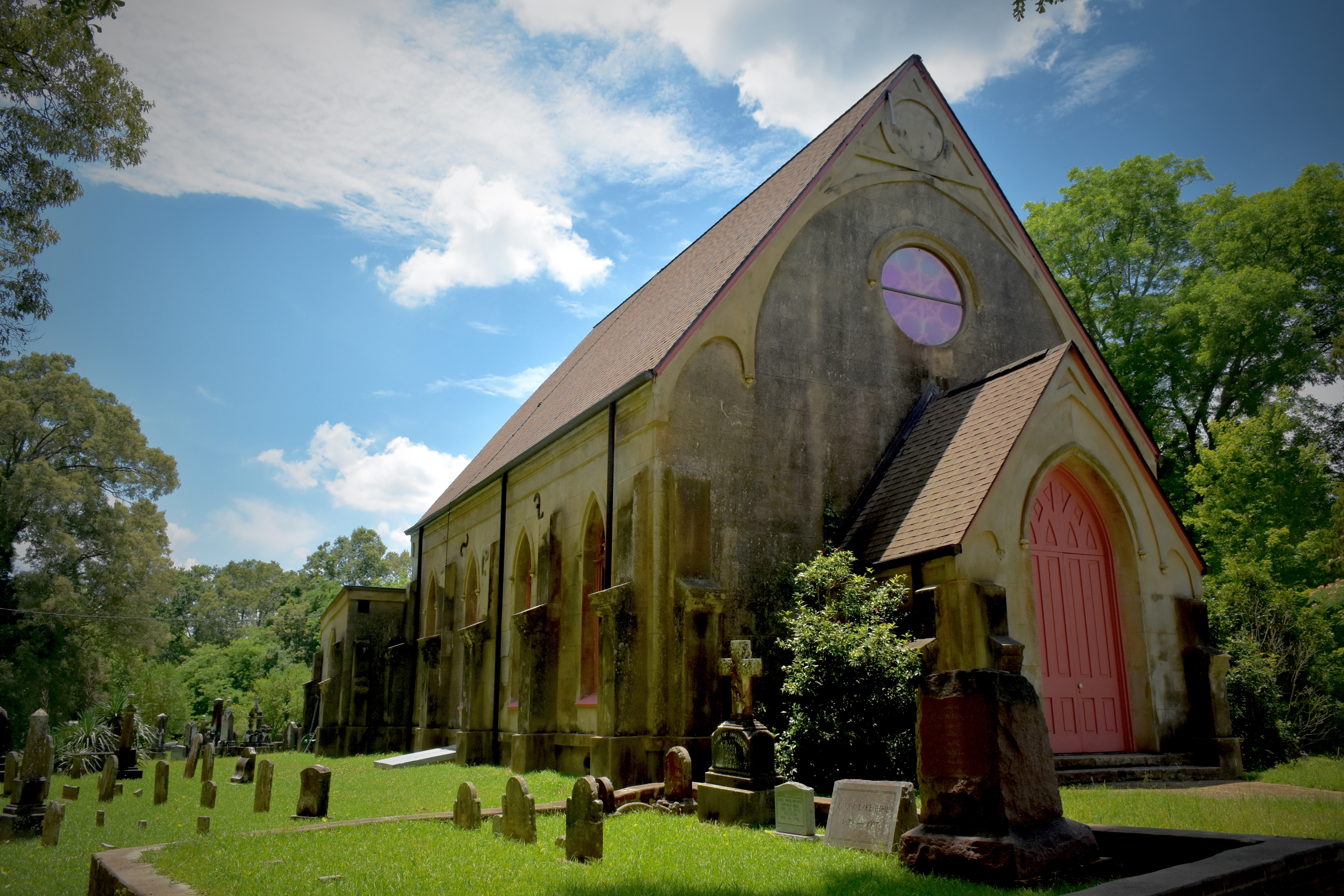
- Christ Church, completed in 1858

- Location within Mississippi Location within the United States
- Coordinates: 31°42′59″N 91°14′17″W
- Country: United States
- State: Mississippi
- County: Jefferson
- Elevation: 213 ft (65 m)

Population (1900)
  - Total: 107
- Time zone: UTC-6 (Central (CST))
  - Summer (DST): UTC-5 (CDT)
- Area codes: 601 & 769
- GNIS feature ID

Church Hill is a small unincorporated community in Jefferson County, Mississippi, United States. It is located eight miles east of the Mississippi River and approximately 18 miles north of Natchez at the intersection of highway 553 and Church Hill Road. Church Hill was a community of wealthy cotton planters and enslaved people before the American Civil War. Soil erosion, which had been going on since well before the Civil War, caused the area to decline into a poor farming community with none of the land under cultivation by 1999. The area is remarkable because its antebellum buildings are mostly intact with few modern buildings having been built.

== History ==
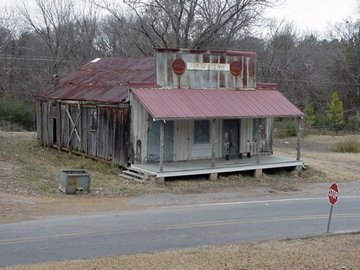
Wagners grocery store in Church Hill, believed to have been in operation in 1837

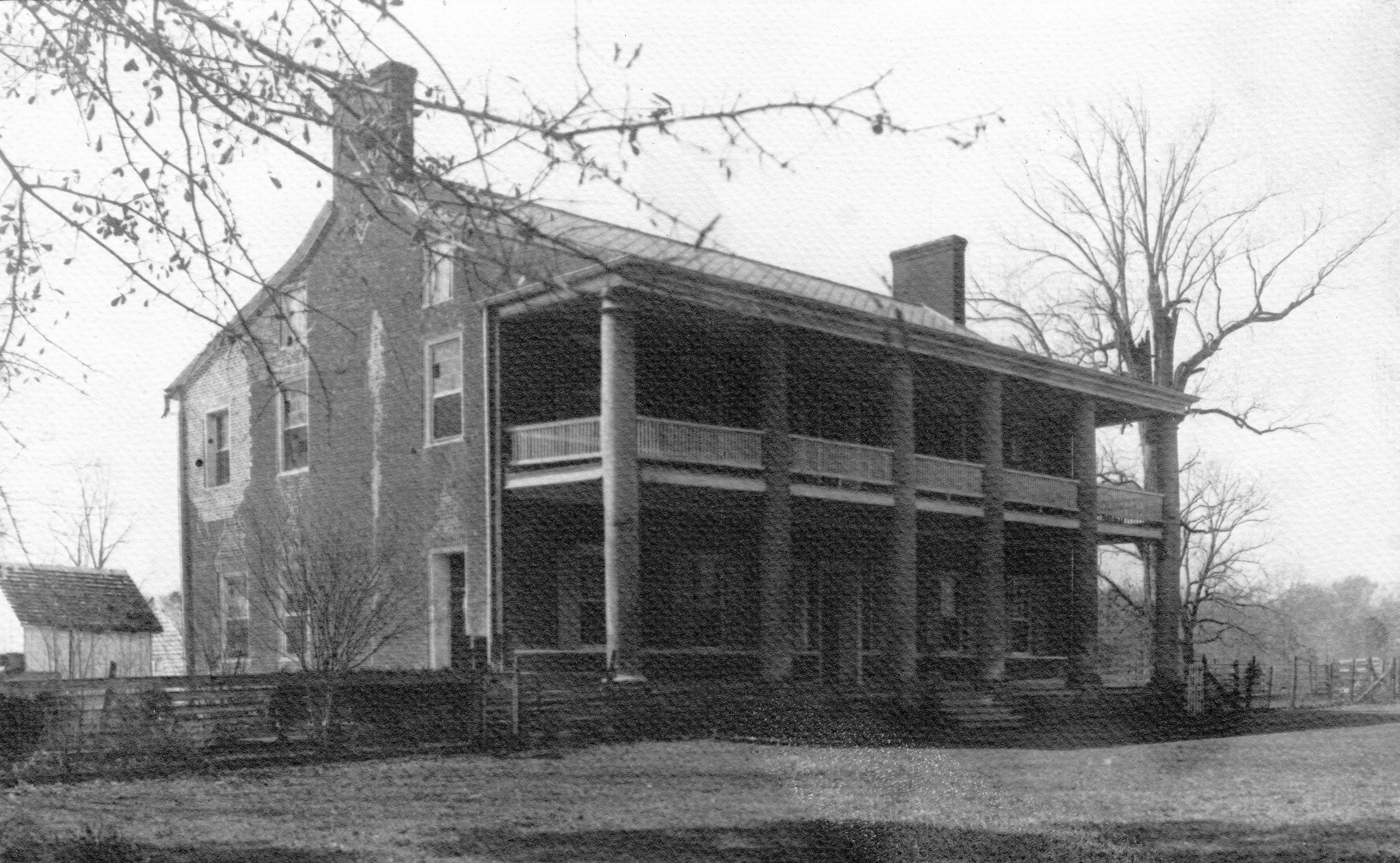
Springfield Plantation owner's residence

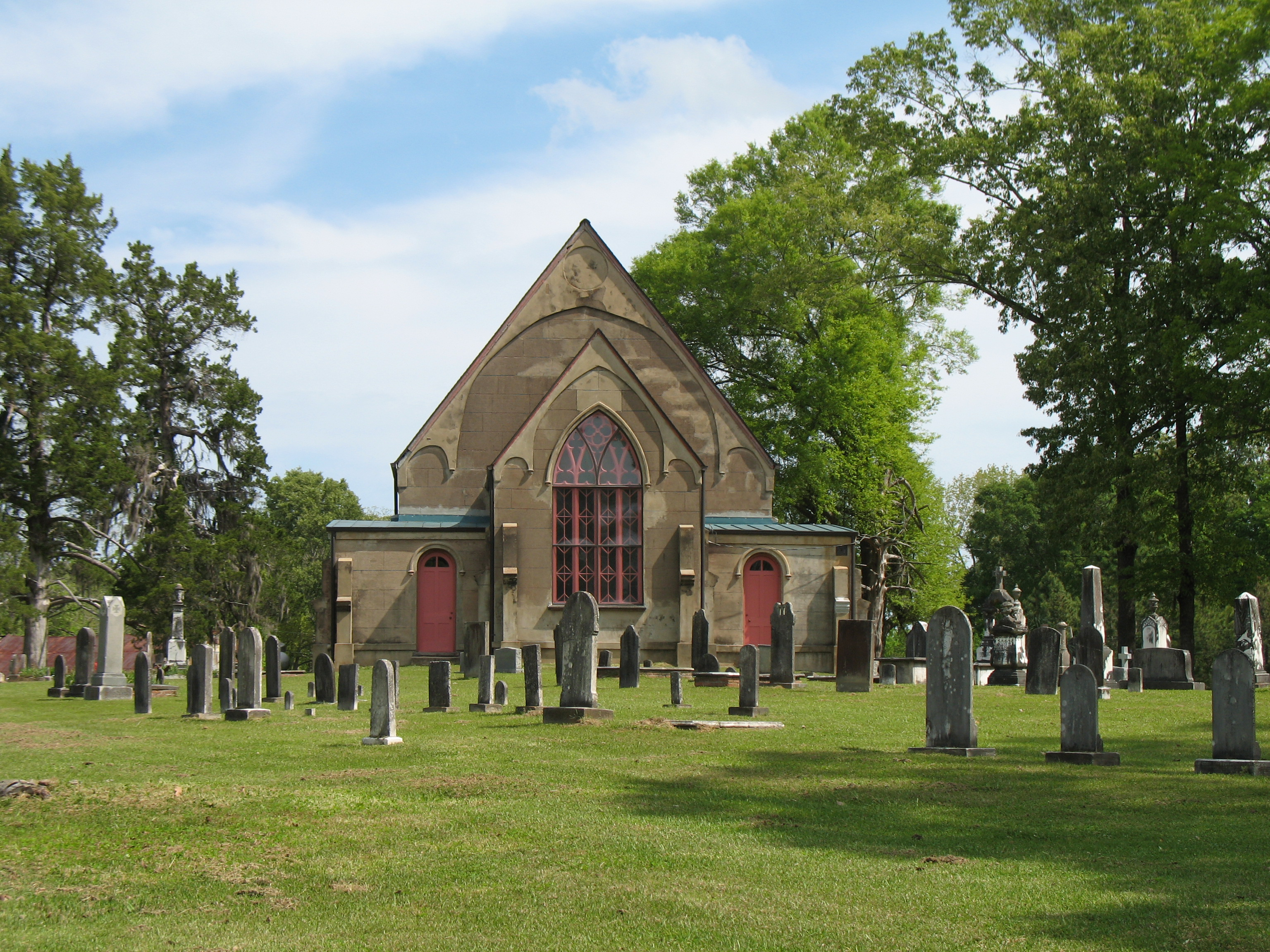
Christ Church cemetery

The Church Hill community got its name from Christ Church - an Episcopal Church located on a terraced hill at the intersection of Church Hill Road and Highway 553. It is the last of three successive buildings. The first building of 1820 was made of logs on population ridge. The second building of 1829 was half mile to the south east of the first on land formerly owned by James G. Wood. The third building was completed in 1858 in the same general location as the second building. This land was donated by Ms James Payne. The fine craftsmanship and decorative details of the third church reflect the great wealth of the area planters in 1858. All of the massive beams in the hammer-beam roof (one of the few in Mississippi) have been stained and false grained. Three of the workmen signed the false graining before it dried.

Across the intersection from the Christ Church is Wagner's Store, which closed in 1998. The store building dates stylistically to ca. 1855-1880 and is one of the oldest country stores remaining in Mississippi. The old community post office operated from the store. Remarkably, the original interior store counters survive.

Church Hill was a community of wealthy cotton planters and the people whom they enslaved before the American Civil War. In antebellum times, most of the area plantations were essentially each self-contained communities isolated in clearings in the woods. With a few exceptions travellers along the area roads just saw woods, with occasional gates that led into the plantations. Soil erosion in the 1800s continually decreased the amount of land that was suitable for farming. After the Civil War the main crop remained cotton until around 1933 when the boll weevil destroyed cotton farming in the area. By this time soil erosion had caused the area to become a poor farming community, and it remained so throughout the twentieth century. Almost none of the land is being farmed as of 1999; thus, the area is more wooded than it was in antebellum times. A large number of the owner's residences and other buildings on these former plantations remain and are privately owned. Among these are The Cedars, Oak Grove, Pecan Grove (also known as the Bluffs), Richland, Springfield, Woodland, and Wyolah.

Antebellum plantations (Gayoso, Pecan Grove, Logonia, Oak Grove, Cedars, Woodland and Springfield) line a twelve-mile stretch of highway 533 that includes Christ Church. Details about many of the area plantations are as follows.

- In about 1776 the first group of settlers came to the area by flat boat from Virginia. Some of the family names were Noble, Donahoe, Hamberlin, and Fletcher.
  - Isaac Noble had a large plantation near Church Hill.
  - Lochiel Plantation was the home of Isaac's daughter Maria and her husband Charles Donoho.
  - Mount Ararat Plantation belonged to a Marine called Captain Magruder who settled in the area in about 1776. His descendants, the Drakes, kept Mount Ararat Plantation.
- In about 1800 the Baker brothers from New Jersey, Colonel James G. Wood from Maryland, James Payne and William Brooks settled in the Church Hill community.
  - Pecan Grove Plantation (also known as The Bluffs) which adjoined the Green family property belonged to Thomas Baker. Thomas Baker first married into the Brooks family and next into the Green family who owned Gayosa Plantation. The Greens also owned nearby Richland Plantation and Springfield Plantation.
  - Auburn Hall Plantation belonged to James G. Wood. It was very large extending from Church Hill to Selsertown. Wood divided the large tract into plantations for his many children.
    - Oak Grove Plantation belonged to Jane Wood and her husband James Payne.
    - Woodburn Plantation belonged to Walter Wood.
    - The Cedars Plantation, which adjoined Oak Grove, belonged to Maria Wood and her husband Thomas Elam. At times, the Cedars was part of the Plains Plantation, which was owned at various times by Joseph Dunbar (politician) (a Church Hill lawyer who owned and lived on Arundo Plantation), David Hunt (of Woodlawn Plantation), and Benjamin Beavin.
    - Woodland Plantation belonged to Robert Y. Wood and his wife Virginia Smith.
    - Lagonia Plantation, located across the road from Oak Grove Plantation, belonged to Eliza Wood and her husband James Blanchard. Dr. Bisland Shields, a descendant of Colonel James G. Wood, later owned Lagonia.
  - The Miskell Place belonged to John Brooks.
- Judge Thomas Rodney and Judge William Shields came to Rodney, Mississippi (formerly known as Petit Gulf) in 1802.
  - Rokeby Plantation in Church Hill was Judge Shields and his wife Victoria Benoit's home. After Judge Shield's death, young Seargent Smith Prentiss, who later was a famous lawyer, was a tutor on Rokeby plantation for the Shields children - Joseph Dunbar Shields, Thomas Rodney Shields, Gabriel Benoit Shields, Francina Shields and William Bayard Shields.

== Notable people ==
- Gaines Ruger Donoho was an American painter who grew up on his father's plantation in Church Hill, Mississippi.
- Joseph Dunbar (politician), who owned and lived on Arundo Plantation in the Church Hill area. He married Lizzie Magruder - the Magruders owned Mount Ararat Plantation. Dunbar's father, Robert Dunbar, owned Oakley Grove Plantation at the site of the current Adams County airport and was patriarch of the country Dunbar planter clan. Robert also owned the land that Lansdowne (Natchez, Mississippi) was later formed on by his descendant Charlotte (Hunt) Marshall.
- Thomas M. Green Sr. (November 19, 1723$\wedge$1805) was a Colonel in the American Revolutionary War who owned a plantation in Church Hill, Mississippi.
- Thomas M. Green Jr. was a Mississippi Territorial politician, planter, and Delegate to the United States House of Representatives during the 7th United States Congress representing the Mississippi Territory, who owned Springfield Plantation in Church Hill, Mississippi.
- George Hamilton is an American actor who lived on and owned Cedar Grove Place, also known as the Cedars Plantation, in Church Hill, Mississippi in 1978.
- James Steptoe Johnston was born in 1843 near Church Hill to a local attorney and cotton planter. He became a prominent Bishop in the Episcopal Church.
- Tate Taylor is an American actor, screenwriter, film producer and director who lives on Wyolah Plantation in Church Hill, Mississippi as of 2017.

== Additional maps ==
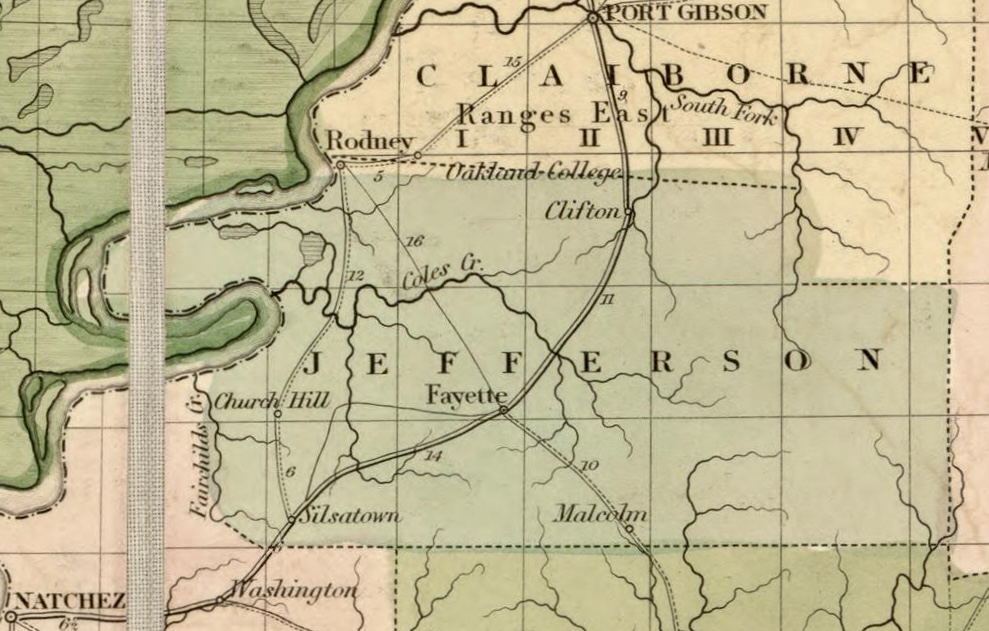
Church Hill and other settlements of Jefferson County mapped 1839

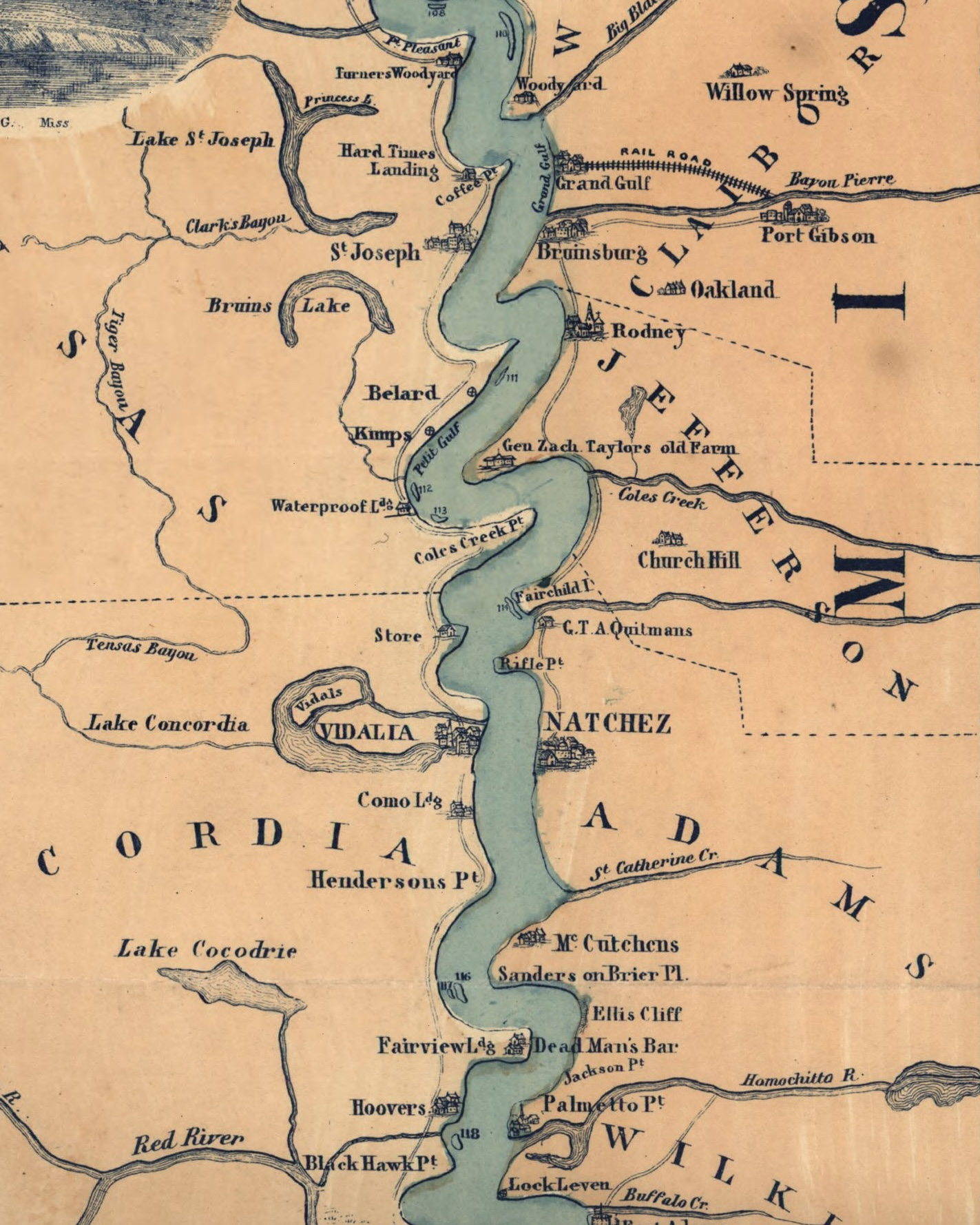
Schematic map of the lower Mississippi during the American Civil War showing landmarks in the vicinity of Vicksburg, Vidalia, and Natchez

Map of Church Hill

== See also ==
- Cedar Grove Place
- Christ Church (Church Hill, Mississippi)
- Oak Grove (Church Hill, Mississippi)
- Pecan Grove (Church Hill, Mississippi)
- Richland (Church Hill, Mississippi)
- Springfield Plantation
- Woodland Plantation (Church Hill, Mississippi)
- Woodlawn Plantation (Jefferson County, Mississippi)
- Wyolah Plantation
