= Laurietta =

Historic house in Mississippi, United States

- U.S. National Register of Historic Places
- Location within Mississippi Location within the United States
- Nearest city: Fayette, Mississippi
- Coordinates: 31°40′45″N 91°4′56″W
- Area: 8.3 acres (3.4 ha)
- Built: 1825
- Architectural style: Federal
- NRHP reference No.: 80002253
- Added to NRHP: November 24, 1980

Laurietta is a historic building in Fayette, Jefferson County, Mississippi.

== Location ==
It is located off the Mississippi Highway 33 in Fayette, Mississippi.

== Overview ==
It has been listed on the National Register of Historic Places since November 24, 1980.
