= Hughes–Clark House =

Historic house in Mississippi, United States

- U.S. National Register of Historic Places
- Location within Mississippi Location within the United States
- Location: 221 Poindexter St., Fayette, Mississippi
- Coordinates: 31°42′40″N 91°3′36″W
- Area: 1 acre (0.40 ha)
- Built: 1838
- Architectural style: Greek Revival
- NRHP reference No.: 87001260
- Added to NRHP: August 3, 1987

The Hughes–Clark House is a historic building in Fayette, Jefferson County, Mississippi.

== Location ==
It is located at 21 Poindexter Street in Fayette, Mississippi.

== Overview ==
The architectural style is Greek Revival.

It has been listed on the National Register of Historic Places since August 3, 1987.
