= China Grove (Lorman, Mississippi) =

Historic house in Mississippi, United States

- U.S. National Register of Historic Places
- Location: Lorman, Mississippi
- Coordinates: 31.8345°N 91.06634°W
- Area: 240.9 acres (97.5 ha)
- Architect: Wiley McDonald; Willis McDonald
- Architectural style: Greek Revival architecture
- NRHP reference No.: 80002254
- Added to NRHP: April 3, 1980

China Grove is a historic building in Lorman, Jefferson County, Mississippi.

== Overview ==
It was designed by architects Wiley McDonald and Willis McDonald. The architectural style is Greek Revival.

It has been listed on the National Register of Historic Places since April 3, 1980.
