= Blantonia Plantation =

Historic house in Mississippi, United States

- Blantonia Plantation House
- U.S. National Register of Historic Places
- Location within Mississippi Location within the United States
- Nearest city: Lorman, Mississippi
- Coordinates: 31°48′6″N 90°55′55″W
- Area: less than one acre
- Built: 1812
- Architectural style: Greek Revival
- NRHP reference No.: 93000145
- Added to NRHP: March 4, 1993

Blantonia Plantation House is a historic Southern plantation of Blantonia in Lorman, Jefferson County, Mississippi. John Blanton and Martha Belton "Patsy" Whitaker established the plantation in the early 1800s. John Blanton, originally from Virginia, moved to Kentucky about 1800 and eventually the family moved and established the plantation Blantonia, just south of Vicksburg. Blantonia Plantation House was initially constructed in 1812 as a pile-and-a-half "expanded I-house". Their son William Whitaker Blanton is listed in census records in Jefferson County, would establish the second Blantonia plantation, known as Blantonia plantation on Bachelor's Bend and referenced as Bachelor's Bend plantation in Hall v. United States, 92 U.S. 27 (1875). Another large, Blantonia plantation was also established in the area of Greenville, Mississippi in Washington County from a United States land grant in 1828 to the north along the Mississippi River. Throughout their history, the plantations were worked by enslaved people.

== Overview ==
The plantation house has been listed on the National Register of Historic Places since March 4, 1993. The architectural style is Greek Revival.
