= Pecan Grove (Church Hill, Mississippi) =

Historic house in Mississippi, United States

- U.S. National Register of Historic Places
- Location within Mississippi Location within the United States
- Nearest city: Church Hill, Mississippi
- Coordinates: 31°44′6″N 91°13′51″W
- Area: 8.3 acres (3.4 ha)
- Built: 1816
- Architectural style: Federal
- NRHP reference No.: 80002252
- Added to NRHP: March 13, 1980

Peacan Grove is a historic building in Church Hill, Jefferson County, Mississippi.

== Location ==
It is located off the Mississippi Highway 551.

== Overview ==
The architectural style is Federal.

It has been listed on the National Register of Historic Places since March 13, 1980.
