= Old Hill Place Bridge =

- U.S. National Register of Historic Places
- Location within Mississippi Location within the United States
- Nearest city: Fayette, Mississippi
- Coordinates: 31°40′9″N 91°10′52″W
- Area: 0 acres (0 ha)
- Built: 1920
- Built by: Schuster & Jacob
- Architectural style: Twin-tower swinging suspension bridge
- MPS: Swinging Suspension Bridges TR
- NRHP reference No.: 79003430
- Added to NRHP: May 23, 1979

Old Hill Place Bridge is a historic bridge in Fayette, Mississippi. The bridge, built by Schuster & Jacob, is located on Hill Road, over Coles Creek. It was listed on the National Register of Historic Places in 1979.
