= Albert Clark (baseball) =

American baseball player

- Outfielder
- Born: July 2, 1910; Fayette, Mississippi
- Died: March 12, 1988 (aged 77); Baton Rouge, Louisiana

Negro league baseball debut
- 1930, for the Chicago American Giants

Last appearance
- 1930, for the Chicago American Giants

Teams
- Chicago American Giants (1930)

Albert Dennis Clark (July 2, 1910 – March 12, 1988) was an American Negro league outfielder in the 1930s.

A native of Fayette, Mississippi, Clark played for the Chicago American Giants in 1930. He died in Baton Rouge, Louisiana in 1988 at age 77.
