= Youngblood Bridge =

- U.S. National Register of Historic Places
- Location within Mississippi Location within the United States
- Nearest city: Union Church, Mississippi
- Coordinates: 31°38′0″N 90°48′51″W
- Area: 1 acre (0.40 ha)
- Built: 1900
- Architect: Schuster & Jacob; Gallbreath, J.F.
- Architectural style: Twin-tower swng. susp. brdg.
- MPS: Swinging Suspension Bridges TR
- NRHP reference No.: 79003428
- Added to NRHP: May 23, 1979

Youngblood Bridge is a historic bridge in Union Church, Jefferson County, Mississippi. It is located on Youngblood Road in Union Church, Mississippi, over the Fifteenmile Creek

== Overview ==
It was built by J.F. Gallbreath and Schuster & Jacob. and has been listed on the National Register of Historic Places since May 23, 1979.
