= Harriston, Mississippi =

- Unincorporated community
- Location within Mississippi Location within the United States
- Coordinates: 31°43′31″N 91°01′56″W
- Country: United States
- State: Mississippi
- County: Jefferson
- Elevation: 210 ft (64 m)
- Time zone: UTC-6 (Central (CST))
  - Summer (DST): UTC-5 (CDT)
- ZIP code: 39069, 39081 (PO Box)
- Area code: 601
- GNIS feature ID: 670984

Harriston is an unincorporated community located in Jefferson County, Mississippi, United States. Harriston is approximately 1 mile (1.6 km) northeast of Fayette and approximately 7 miles (11 km) south of Lorman on Old Highway 61.

== History ==
Harriston was named for General Nathaniel H. Harris, who served as the first president of the Vicksburg & New Orleans Railroad. James Lowe and E. R. Jones were the first settlers of Harriston.

Harriston is located on a now-abandoned Illinois Central Railroad line. A post office opened in 1885, and the settlement was incorporated in 1886. The settlement was later disincorporated and the post office closed.

Harriston was affected by a smallpox epidemic in the spring of 1896. The community was placed under quarantine in 1898 due to a yellow fever epidemic.
