= Gaines Ruger Donoho =

American painter

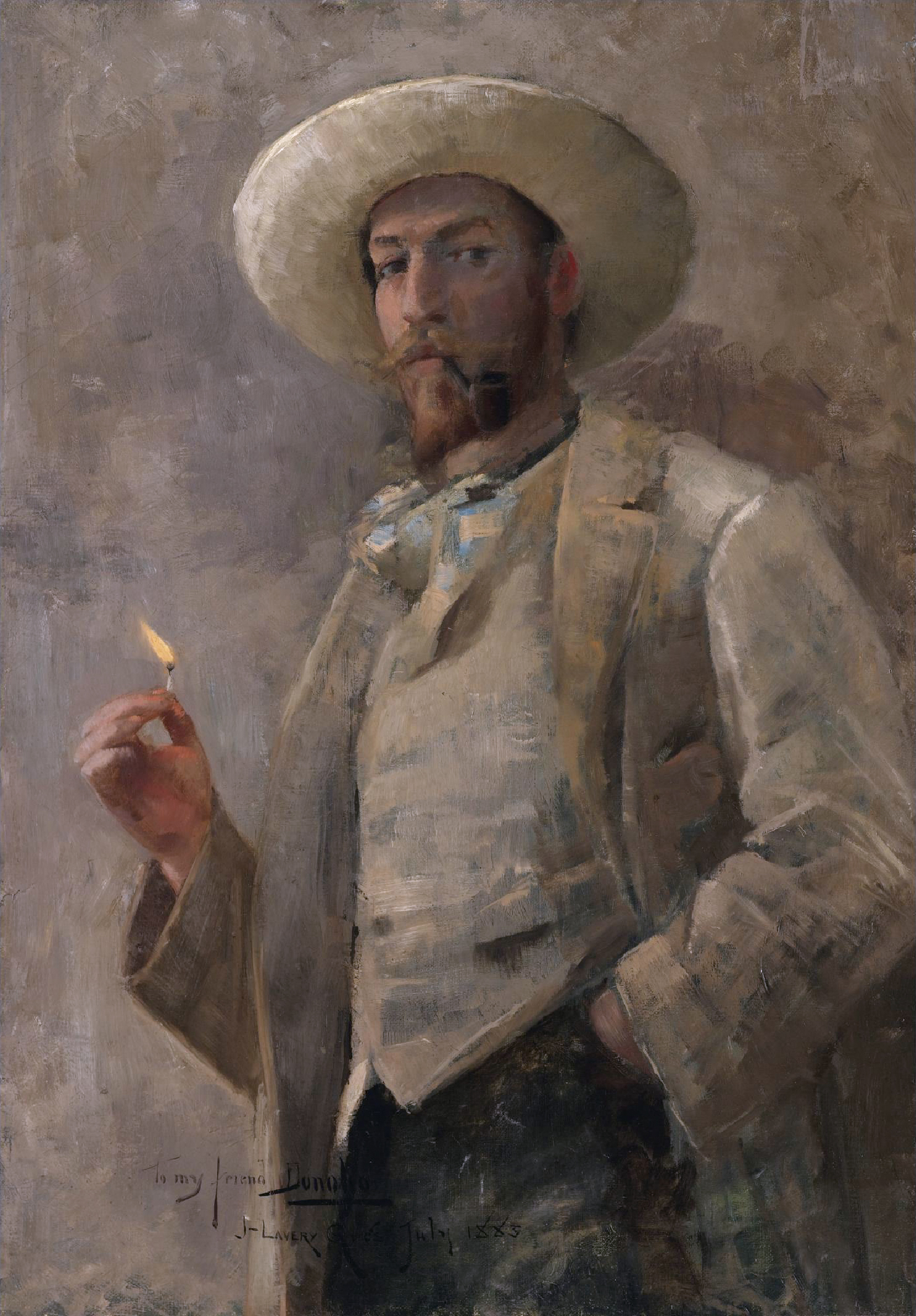
- Portrait by John Lavery
- Born: December 21, 1857; Church Hill, Mississippi, US
- Died: January 28, 1916 (aged 58); New York City, US
- Education: Art Students League of New York
- Occupation: Painter
- Spouse: Matilda Ackley Donoho
- Relatives: Thomas H. Ruger

Gaines Ruger Donoho (December 21, 1857 – January 28, 1916) was an American painter.

== Biography ==
=== Early life ===
Gaines Ruger Donoho was born on December 21, 1857, in Church Hill, Mississippi. He grew up on his father Robert's plantation in Church Hill, Mississippi, until the elder Donoho was killed during the American Civil War. One of his mother's relatives, General Thomas H. Ruger (1833–1907), had them moved to New England with the rest of her family. He was trained as a painter at the Art Students League of New York in New York City and spent eight years in Paris.

=== Career ===
He practised as an Impressionist, Symbolist and Tonalist painter in Manhattan. In 1891, he moved to East Hampton, where he continued to paint. He is best known for his landscape and garden paintings, some of which are reminiscent of Claude Monet's Giverney garden paintings. Additionally, he also did some drawings.

Some of his work is exhibited at the Metropolitan Museum of Art in Manhattan, Brooklyn Museum in Brooklyn, New York City and at the Mississippi Museum of Art in Jackson, Mississippi.

John Lavery (1856–1941) painted his portrait.

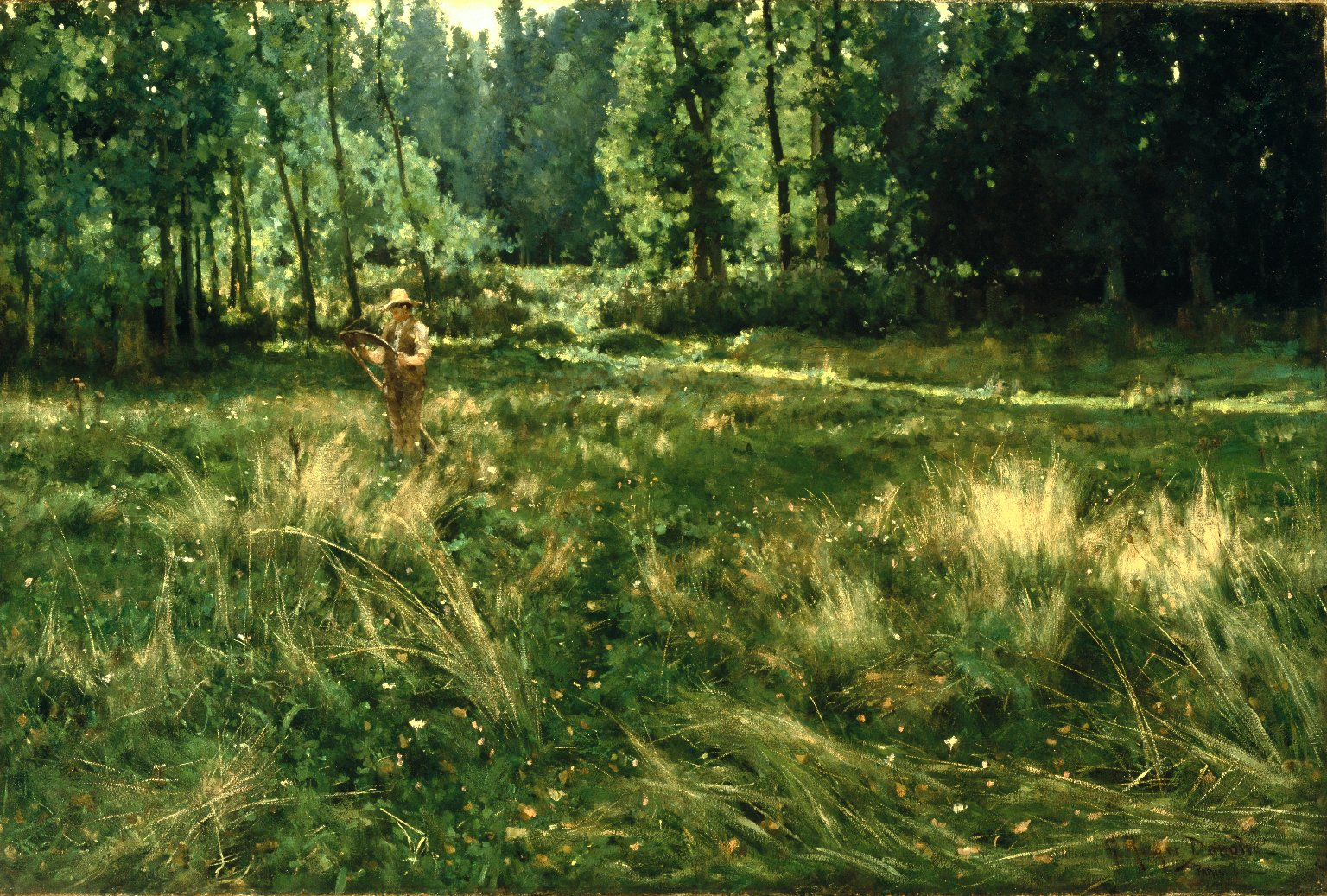
La Marcellerie

=== Personal life ===
He was married to Matilda Ackley Donoho. He died on January 28, 1916, in New York City. After Donoho's death, Matilda Donoho sold the Long Island property to the Childe Hassams - good friends.

== Selected paintings ==
- Wind Flowers (Metropolitan Museum of Art).
- East Hampton Garden (Long Island Museum of American Art, History, and Carriages).
- La Marcellerie (Brooklyn Museum).

== Secondary source ==
- Ronald G. Pisano, G. Ruger Donoho (1857–1916): A Retrospective Exhibition (Hirschl & Adler Galleries, 1977, 21 pages).
- René Paul Barilleaux, G. Ruger Donoho: A Painter's Path (Jackson, Mississippi: Univ. Press of Mississippi, 1995).
