= Jefferson County School District (Mississippi) =

School district in Mississippi

Address
- 942 Main Street Fayette, Mississippi, 39069; United States

District information
- Type: Public
- Grades: PreK–12
- NCES District ID: 2802220

Students and staff
- Students: 1,089
- Teachers: 76.48 (FTE)
- Staff: 109.92 (FTE)
- Student–teacher ratio: 14.24

Other information
- Website: www.jcpsd.net

The Jefferson County School District is a public school district headquartered in Fayette, Mississippi (USA).

The district's boundaries parallel that of Jefferson County.

== Governance ==
The headquarters are in the Robert L. Williams Educational Administration Building in Fayette.

== Schools ==
- Jefferson County High School

In 2022 Jefferson County High School had 305 students. 98.7 percent were black. Test scores at the school in math and reading are well below the state average. It used to be called Fayette High School. Tigers are the mascot. The school has won two district championships and no state championships in football. State legislator Jeffery Harness and football player Louis Green are alumni.

- Jefferson County Junior High School
- Jefferson County Upper Elementary School
- Jefferson County Elementary School

== Demographics ==
=== 2006-07 school year ===
There were a total of 1,473 students enrolled in the Jefferson County School District during the 2006–2007 school year. The gender makeup of the district was 49% female and 51% male. The racial makeup of the district was 99.80% African American and 0.20% Asian. All of the district's students were eligible to receive free lunch.

=== Previous school years ===
School Year	Enrollment	Gender Makeup		Racial Makeup				
School Year	Enrollment	Female	Male	Asian	African American	Hispanic	Native American	White
2005-06	1,480	49%	51%	0.27%	99.73%	–	–	–
2004-05	1,516	49%	51%	0.07%	99.87%	–	–	0.07%
2003-04	1,593	49%	51%	–	99.94%	–	–	0.06%
2002-03	1,653	49%	51%	0.06%	99.94%	–	–	–

== Accountability statistics ==
	2006-07	2005-06	2004-05	2003-04	2002-03
District Accreditation Status	Accredited	Accredited	Accredited	Accredited	Accredited
School Performance Classifications
Level 5 (Superior Performing) Schools	0	0	0	0	0
Level 4 (Exemplary) Schools	2	0	0	1	1
Level 3 (Successful) Schools	2	1	2	2	2
Level 2 (Under Performing) Schools	0	1	1	0	0
Level 1 (Low Performing) Schools	0	1	0	0	0
Not Assigned	0	0	0	0	0

== See also ==
- List of school districts in Mississippi
