= Thomas M. Green Sr. =

Mississippi colonist (1723–1805)

Thomas Marston Green Sr.
- Born: 19 November 1723; Williamsburg, Virginia
- Died: 1805 (aged 81–82); Jefferson County, Mississippi
- Burial place: Jefferson County, Mississippi
- Military career
- Allegiance: United States of America
- Branch: Continental Army
- Rank: Colonel
- Other work: Magistrate of Mississippi Territory

Thomas Marston Green Sr. (November 19, 1723 – 1805) was a colonel in the American Revolutionary War.

== Early life ==
Thomas was born in Williamsburg, Virginia to Thomas Green III and Elizabeth Marston. His family was prosperous, and Thomas's schooling was by a private tutor.

== The American Revolution ==
Not much is known of Green's service in the Revolution. What is known is that he was a commissioned colonel in the Colonial Army. He later moved to Georgia where he met and befriended General George Rogers Clark. After discussing a plan with Clark, Thomas gathered a small army. Green gathered his men at the Holston River, where they built a small fleet of boats. After floating down the river the party did not find George as expected, so they continued on to Natchez, Mississippi. Thomas received an interview with the Spanish governor, Manuel Gayoso de Lemos, where he claimed the entire district for Georgia. The Spanish, expecting a revolt, had him arrested and thrown in prison in New Orleans. Soon afterward, his wife Martha came down to have him released, but she soon after died of exposure and stress. The governor, feeling sympathy for the Green family, released Thomas. He settled his family in Jefferson County, Mississippi, where he became one of the most influential men in the territory. He was also instrumental in forming Bourbon county the 2nd largest county in the United States history when he had the Bourbon Act of 1785 passed.

Green, or possibly his son, is mentioned in a 1782 letter from one official of Spanish colonial Mississippi to another, Carlos Grand-Pre to Esteban Rodríguez Miró:

It is suspected that a large part of the slaves brought by Thomas Green were similarly obtained [stolen]. As regards the others, they have acquired their slaves by the proceeds of the sale of their property. It is probable that part of these Americans, that is, those who have perpetrated these thefts, have abandoned their country in order to enjoy, far from any anxiety, the fruits of their pillage. They had brought many firearms, guns, and carbines, and one cannon that has been transported to the Fort of Natchez. They have not deposited any arms anywhere near the post. Thomas Green may have some thirty pounds of powder and much ball. This Thomas Green was a maker of powder, and it is his trade or profession.

== Andrew Jackson and Rachel Donelson ==
Green is perhaps most famous for allegedly performing the marriage of Andrew Jackson to Rachel Donelson. Sometime in 1791 at his family's Springfield Plantation, Green, as one of the magistrates of the Mississippi Territory, married the couple.

== Wife and children ==
On November 21, 1752, Thomas married Martha Wills with whom he had ten children, including Abner Green and Congressman Thomas M. Green Jr. His daughter Martha Wills Green was married to Cato West. His son Abraham Green married Elizabeth Caffery, whose mother was Mary Donelson Caffery and aunt was Rachel Donelson Jackson, wife of Andrew Jackson.
