= Woodland Plantation (Church Hill, Mississippi) =

Historic house in Mississippi, United States

- U.S. National Register of Historic Places
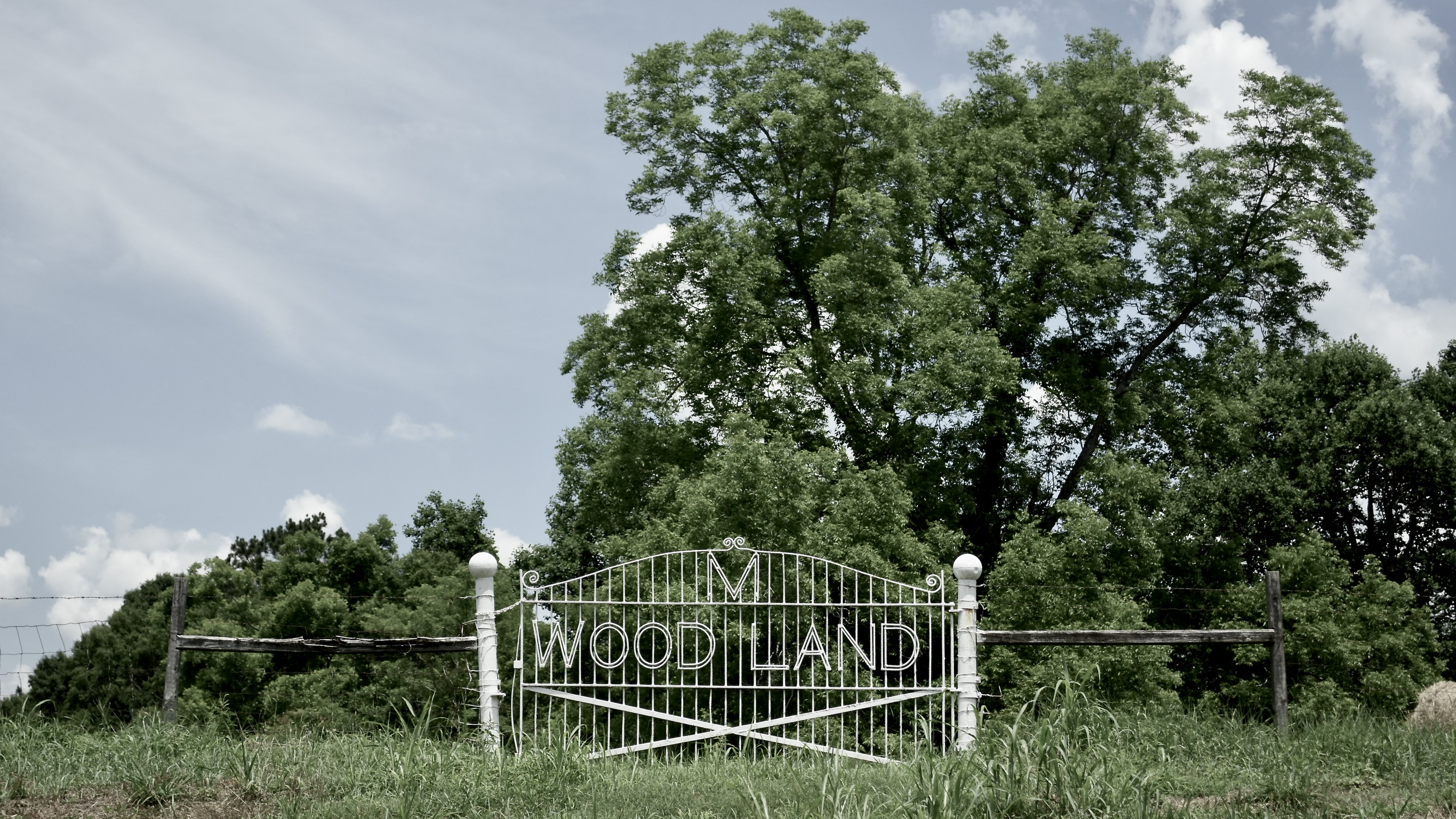
- Woodland Plantation gate

- Location within Mississippi Location within the United States
- Location: Church Hill, Mississippi
- Coordinates: 31°40′24.41″N 91°13′38.38″W
- Area: 230 acres (93 ha)
- Built: 1838
- Architect: Robert Y. Wood
- Architectural style: Gothic Revival architecture; Greek Revival architecture
- NRHP reference No.: 78001605

The Woodland Plantation is a historic Southern plantation near Church Hill, Mississippi, United States. It retains its original antebellum 230 acre size, and has the tradition of primarily supplying hay to the area cattle. It also has a pecan orchard.

== Location ==
It is located off of the east side of Mississippi Highway 553 four miles south of Church Hill. It adjoins the Oakwood Plantation.

== History ==
Woodland Plantation was created when James Gillam Wood, who lived on his 1,000 acre Auburn Plantation in Church Hill, Mississippi, was in the process of setting up each of his children with their own, nearby, cotton growing operations. Oak Grove, The Cedars, Lagonia and Woodland were four of these properties. Woodland belonged to James' son Robert Y. Wood.

Robert bought the first 224 acres to form Woodland in 1837 for $18,000, and soon built his residence on the plantation. He married Virginia P. Smith of New Brunswick, New Jersey in 1839. Robert purchased the final six acres of the plantation in 1858. By 1860 Robert had 34 slaves in Jefferson County.

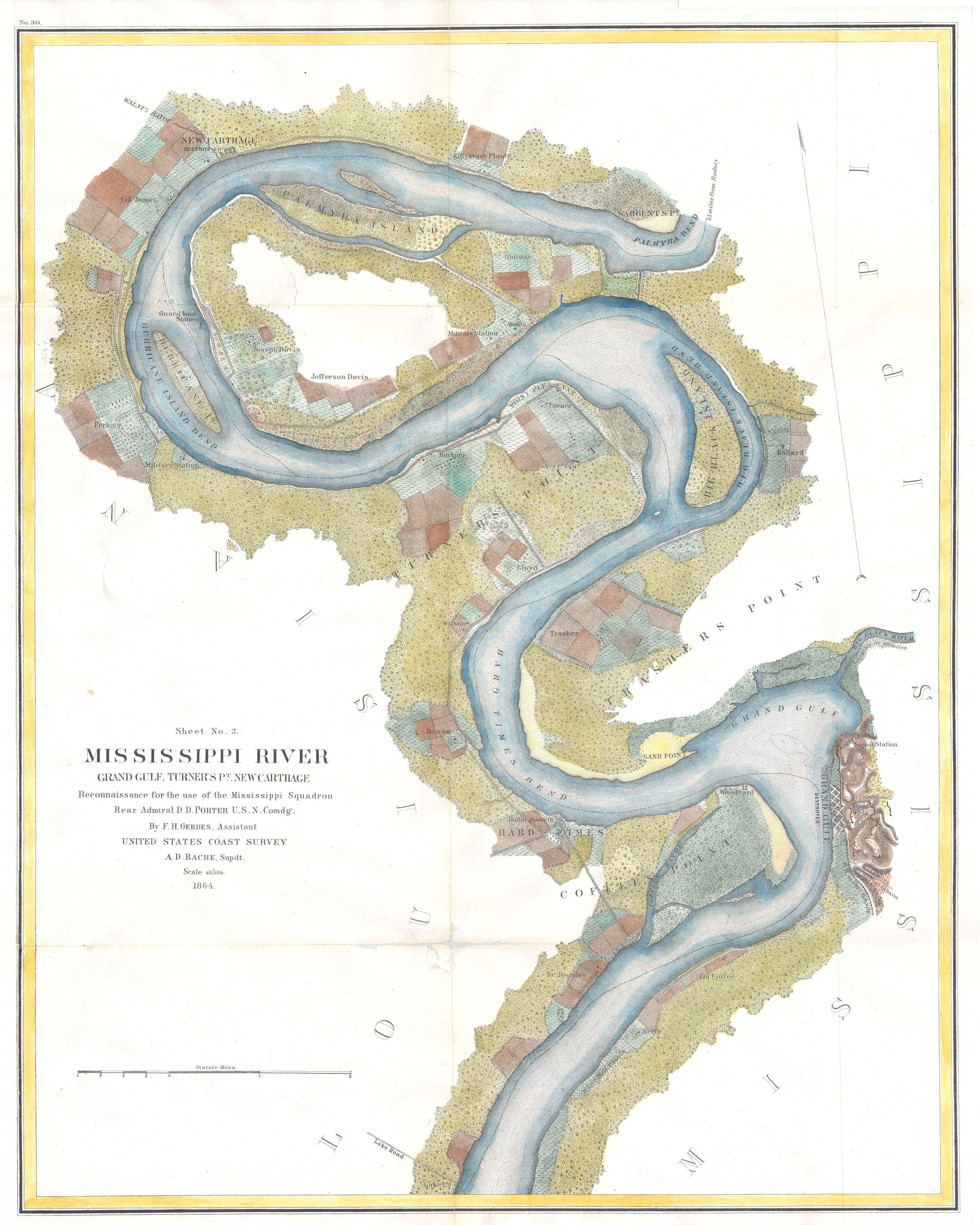
1864 U.S.C.S. Chart of the Mississippi River Grand Gulf to New Carthage ( shows Woods Plantation - Ursino) - Geographicus - MissRive2Col-USCS-1864

Robert also had Ursino Plantation in Warren County, Mississippi that he ran with the help of his brother Edgar. Ursino was formed in 1836 when James Wood and his son Robert purchased a total of 2,083 acres at Davis Bend, located south of Vicksburg on the Mississippi River, for $103,390. This land was bought from James' friend Joseph Emory Davis of Hurricane Plantation. Ursino adjoined Jefferson Davis' Brierfield Plantation which in turn bordered Hurricane Plantation. By 1842 Ursino had 30 head of cattle and 60 slaves. In 1860 Robert had 132 slaves in Warren County.

The relationship between the Davis brothers and the Wood brothers became strained over the years, because the Wood brothers would not maintain the levees at Ursino Plantation. By the 1861 outbreak of the Civil War, overseers ran Ursino and the Wood brothers lived in Jefferson County. Edgar Wood married David Hunt's son Abijah's widow and moved to Calviton Plantation in Jefferson County, Mississippi.

Due to financial difficulty immediately after the Civil War in 1866, Robert sold Woodland Plantation for $10,000 to Ann L. Foster. In 1871 Robert was bankrupt, and he sold Ursino Plantation for $100,000 to Ben Montgomery - a former slave from Hurricane Plantation. Robert and his wife Virginia moved to Woodburn in the Church Hill area until their deaths in 1882. Woodburn was the plantation of Robert's brother Walter Wood.

Somehow, Ann Foster's daughter (Mary A. Foster Lloyd) owned Woodland by 1879. In that year Mary defaulted on a loan and had to transfer ownership of Woodland to Jefferson College in Washington, Adams County, Mississippi, who had provided her financing.

From 1889 to 1936 the plantation had several owners and became badly run down. In 1889 Ann L. Foster purchased Woodland for a second time - from Jefferson College for $1,800. In about 1910 the boll weevil destroyed the local cotton farming, which had been the main crop since before the Civil War when slaves worked the land. After cotton farming ended, Woodland is known to have primarily been used to grow hay to supply the neighborhood cattle and to grow pecans.

In 1936, Philip Heath Marble (1890–1965) purchased Woodland Plantation and restored it. His daughter, Phyllis Marble, lived there until she sold it in 1974.

== Architecture ==
The architectural style of the plantation house is at once Gothic Revival and Greek Revival. It has been listed on the National Register of Historic Places since February 22, 1979. The house is one and a half stories. The house originally had a front and rear gallery, which also connected to the separate kitchen building. A 35 by 15 foot center hall had two 19 by 19 foot rooms on each side. Two of these rooms had marble fireplace mantles and two had wooden mantles. The first floor rooms had 12 and 1/2 foot high ceilings, pocket doors between the front and back parlor, and jib doors under some of the windows to provide direct access to the galleries. A stairway in the center hall rose to the second (1/2) floor, which was originally just one big room.
