= Thomas M. Green Jr. =

Mississippi Territory politician (1758–1813)

Thomas Green
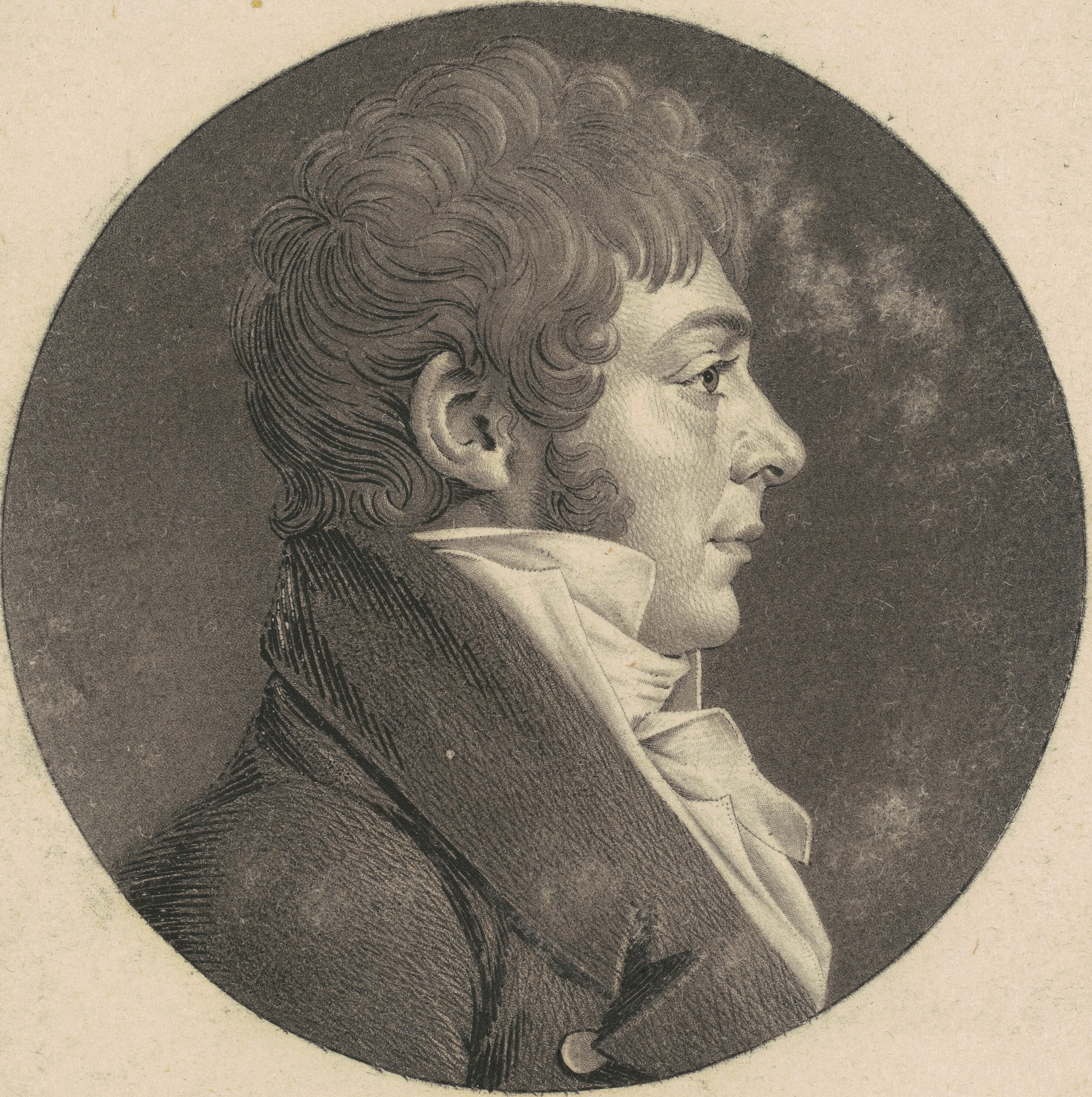

Delegate to the U.S. House of Representatives from the Mississippi Territory's at-large district
- In office December 6, 1802 – March 3, 1803
- Preceded by: Narsworthy Hunter
- Succeeded by: William Lattimore

Personal details
- Born: Thomas Marston Green Jr. February 26, 1758 Williamsburg, Virginia, British America
- Died: February 7, 1813 (aged 54) Jefferson County, Mississippi
- Party: Democratic-Republican
- Spouse: Martha Kirkland

Thomas Marston Green Jr. (February 26, 1758 – February 7, 1813) was a Mississippi Territorial politician, planter, and delegate to the United States House of Representatives during the 7th United States Congress representing the Mississippi Territory.

== Early life ==
Thomas was born to Thomas Marston Green Sr., a future colonel in the Continental Army, and Martha Wills. He was born in Williamsburg, Virginia, on February 26, 1758. In 1782 he moved with his family to Natchez District, Mississippi Territory. He later moved to Fayette, Mississippi, where he would build the Springfield Plantation, and where he would live until his death. The Green family were good friends with Andrew Jackson and Rachel Donelson. Thomas's brother Abraham married Elizabeth Caffery, who was Donelson's niece. In August 1791, Andrew Jackson and Rachel were married at the Green family's Springfield Plantation. The ceremony was performed by Thomas Green Sr., while Thomas Jr. served as a witness. Andrew and Rachel would later find out that Rachel's divorce had not been finalized at the time of the wedding.

== Political life ==
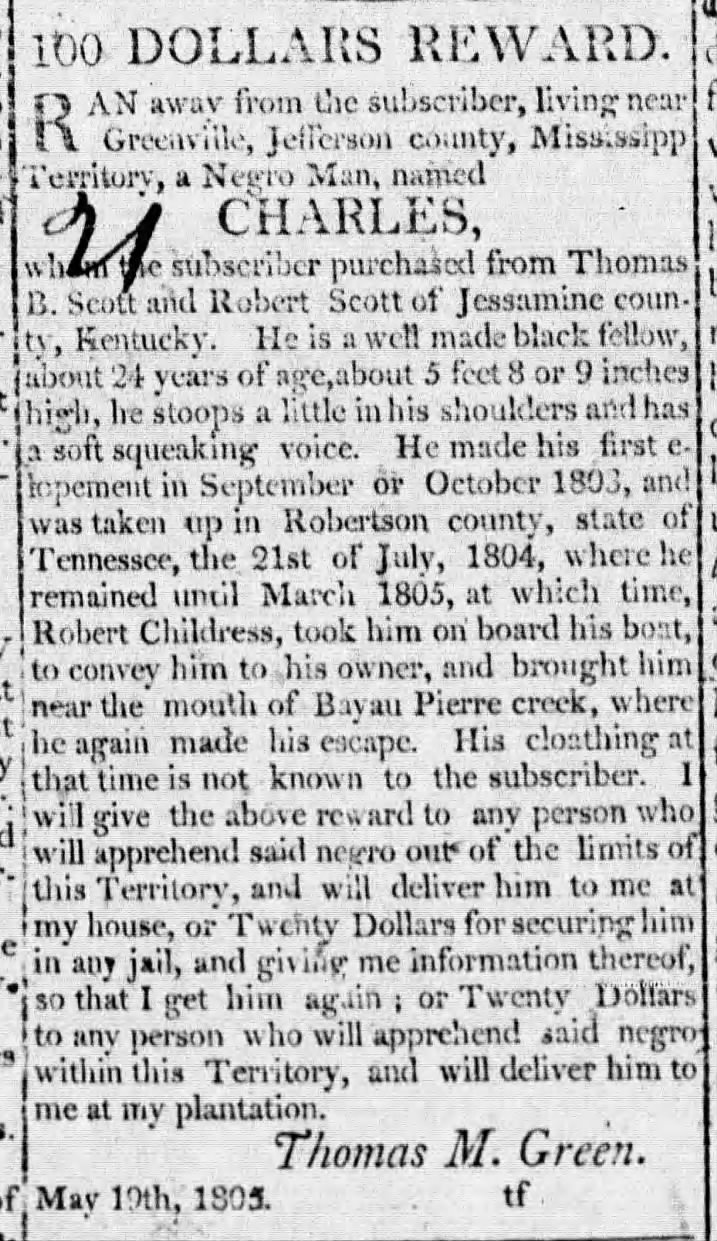
Either Green or his father placed this runaway slave advertisement in the January 16, 1806, Kentucky Gazette.

In 1800, Green was a member of the Mississippi Territory's first general assembly. it was also here where he started making political connections. He also in that time rose to the rank of colonel in the militia. When Narsworthy Hunter died on March 11, 1802, Green was elected to take his place. On December 6 of that year Thomas was in Washington D.C. to take his place as the Mississippi Territory's delegate to the United States House of Representatives. On March 3, 1803, the 7th United States Congress ended, and after 2 months and 25 days in Congress, Thomas decided not to run for reelection, preferring to retire to the comfort of his Mississippi plantation.

After about ten years of retirement, Green died on February 7, 1813, and was buried at the Green Family Cemetery on his plantation.

== Family ==
Thomas married Martha Kirkland on January 15, 1780, with whom he had ten children:

- Joseph Kirkland Green (1780-?), who married Mildred Meriweather Cabell, the daughter of Congressman Samuel Jordan Cabell
- Elizabeth Green (1783–1862), who married John Alexander Davidson, son of General William Lee Davidson
- Martha Wills Green (1783–1808), who married John Hopkins, first cousin of Congressman and Major General Samuel Hopkins
- Mary Green (1787–1815), who married Charles Burr Howell, son of Governor Richard Howell
- Jane Green (1789–1849), who married Archaelaus Kirkland, a distant cousin and a descendant of Richard Snowden Kirkland
- Laminda Green (1791–1819), who married Congressman Thomas Hinds
- Rebecca Green (1793-?), who married Dr. Thomas McCoy
- William Marston Green (1796–1829), who married Laura Prince McCaleb
- Filmer Wills Green (1798–1845), who married Emily Hillman McCaleb
- Augusta Green (1801-abt. 1825), who married Jacob Renson Holmes. When Augusta died Jacob married Augusta's niece Martha Howell, a granddaughter of Governor Richard Howell.

U.S. House of Representatives
| Preceded by Narsworthy Hunter | Delegate to the U.S. House of Representatives from the Mississippi Territory's at-large congressional district 1802–1803 | Succeeded by William Lattimore |
