= Natchez State Park =

State park in Mississippi, United States

- Location within Mississippi
- Location: Stanton, Mississippi, United States
- Coordinates: 31°36′05″N 91°12′51″W
- Elevation: 239 ft (73 m)
- Administrator: Mississippi Department of Wildlife, Fisheries, and Parks
- Designation: Mississippi state park
- Website: Official website

Natchez State Park is a public recreation area in the U.S. state of Mississippi. The park is located off U.S. Highway 61 near Stanton, ten miles (16 km) northeast of its namesake, Natchez, Mississippi.

== Activities and amenities ==
The park features boating and fishing on Natchez Lake, primitive and developed campsites, ten cabins, a nature trail and equestrian roadways, picnic area, and a 9-hole disc golf course. The state record largemouth bass, 18.15 pounds (8.23 kg), was caught in Natchez Lake in 1992.
