= Wyolah Plantation =

Historic house in Mississippi, United States

- U.S. National Register of Historic Places
- Location within Mississippi Location within the United States
- Location: Church Hill, Mississippi
- Coordinates: 31°42′7.56″N 91°14′49.78″W
- Area: 60.4 acres (24.4 ha)
- Architectural style: Greek Revival architecture
- NRHP reference No.: 85001168
- Added to NRHP: May 30, 1985

The Wyolah Plantation is a historic Southern plantation in Church Hill, Mississippi, in the United States. It is located off the Mississippi Highway 553.

== Overview ==
The plantation house at Wyolah was built for Dr. Francis B. Coleman before the American Civil War. The architectural style of the plantation house is Greek Revival. The name "Wyolah" may have been derived from a place in Ireland. Coleman enslaved 81 people in Jefferson County, Mississippi, according to the 1860 census.

Coleman maintained a medical practice in Rodney, Mississippi, and at Wyolah. In the WPA Slave Narrative Collection for the state of Arkansas, formerly enslaved Jefferson County resident Peter Brown told of a period when David Hunt enslaved him on Woodlawn Plantation and Coleman treated his parents, who had contracted cholera. In 1846, Coleman went to Mount Locust Plantation in Jefferson County to vaccinate some enslaved people.

Coleman and his friend Thomas Affleck published a horticulture-related journal from Wyolah Plantation.

Wyolah later passed through several owners, including the Reddy family and the family of Thomas O'Quinn Jr. In 1984, Wyolah was owned by Dr. James W. and Juel F. Delasho and consisted of 110.44 acres, of which 60.44 acres was nominated as a historic site. It has been listed on the National Register of Historic Places since May 30, 1985.

As of 2016, filmmaker Tate Taylor is the owner of Wyolah.
