= Oak Grove (Church Hill, Mississippi) =

Historic house in Mississippi, United States

- U.S. National Register of Historic Places
- Location within Mississippi Location within the United States
- Location: 13582 Highway 533; Church Hill, Mississippi
- Area: 50 acres (20 ha)
- Built: 1828
- Architectural style: Greek Revival architecture; Federal architecture
- NRHP reference No.: 79001318
- Added to NRHP: February 22, 1979

Oak Grove is a historic building and estate in Church Hill, Jefferson County, Mississippi, United States.

== Location ==
It is located at number 13582 on the Highway 533 in Church Hill, Mississippi.

== Overview ==
Oak Grove was created by James G. Wood as a residence for his daughter Jane (Wood) Payne and her husband James Payne. By 1860 Jane C. Payne owned 33 slaves in Jefferson County. It was built in 1828. The architectural style is at once Greek Revival and Federal.

It has been listed on the National Register of Historic Places since February 22, 1979.
