= Cedar Grove Place =

Historic house in Mississippi, United States

Coordinates: 31.712963°N 91.238366°W

- U.S. National Register of Historic Places
- Location within Mississippi Location within the United States
- Location: MS 553, Church Hill, Mississippi
- Area: 120 acres (49 ha)
- Built: 1830
- Architectural style: Greek Revival, Federal
- NRHP reference No.: 79001317
- Added to NRHP: March 28, 1979

Cedar Grove Place (also known as The Cedars) is a historic building in Church Hill, Jefferson County, Mississippi.

== Overview ==
This property has had many owners.

- Cedar Grove Place was created by James G. Wood for his daughter Maria Louisa Wood and her husband Thomas Elam as a 120-acre farm and residence with the same name. The 120-acre tract was previously part of the 1,087-acre Plains Plantation owned by Joseph Dunbar.
- Benjamin Bevin reunited Cedar Grove Place with Plains Plantation. In 1854 he purchased Plains Plantation from David Hunt, and in 1858 he purchased Cedar Grove Place from the Elam family. In 1860 Mr. Beavin owned 84 slaves in Jefferson County.
- Adaline Balch bought the 120-acre Cedar Grove Place in 1873 after Mr. Bevin died.
- In 1938 it was purchased by Josephine Balfour Payne, who wrote children's stories, and her husband Earl Payne from Jeannie L. Bisland.
- Jane A. Warren purchased the property in 1972.
- It was bought by actor George Hamilton in 1978.
- A Hare Krishna commune occupied the property after George Hamilton.

The residence on the property began in about 1830 as a farmhouse and was greatly expanded during Mr. Bevin's ownership. The architectural style is at once Greek Revival and Federal.

Cedar Grove Place has been listed on the National Register of Historic Places since March 28, 1979.
