= Christ Church (Church Hill, Mississippi) =

Historic church in Mississippi, United States

- U.S. National Register of Historic Places
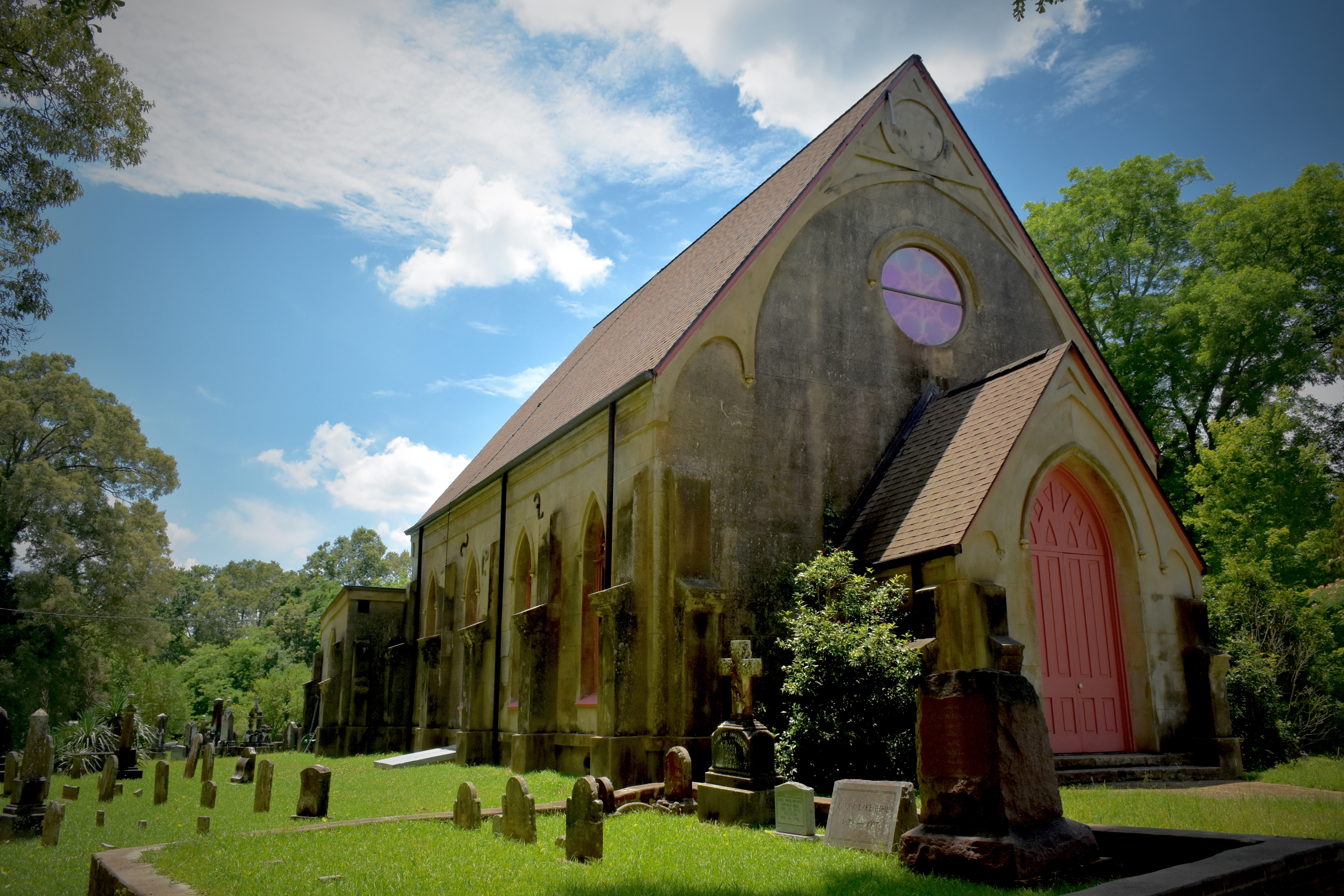
- Front and side of church in 2016

- Location within Mississippi Location within the United States
- Location: On MS 553 in Church Hill, Mississippi
- Coordinates: 31°42′54″N 91°14′17″W
- Area: 1.4 acres (0.57 ha)
- Built: 1858
- Built by: N.L. Carpenter
- Architect: J. Edward Smith
- Architectural style: Gothic Revival
- NRHP reference No.: 77000790
- Added to NRHP: 6 May 1977

Christ Church is a historic church on MS 553 in Church Hill, Mississippi.

== Description and history ==
The building was designed by architect J. Edward Smith in the Gothic Revival style. The brick building is covered in stucco that is scored to simulate ashlar masonry. This stucco was original salmon colored. The nave is rectangular with four bays on each side with narrow lancet windows between buttresses.

It was built in 1858 for the first Episcopalian congregation in Mississippi. This was their third church building and bricks from the second church (1829) were used in its construction. The first had been a log structure built under the guidance of Rev. Adam Cloud who had been expelled for preaching in the area by the Spanish when the area was part of Spanish West Florida. The church was occupied by soldiers of the Union Army in 1864 during the American Civil War. The property was added to the United States National Register of Historic Places on May 6, 1977.

== See also ==
- History of Mississippi
- History of religion in the United States
- National Register of Historic Places listings in Jefferson County, Mississippi
