= Springfield Plantation (Fayette, Mississippi) =

- U.S. National Register of Historic Places
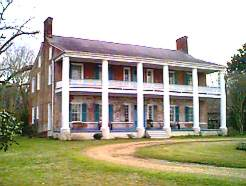
- Springfield Mansion

- Location within Mississippi
- Nearest city: Fayette, Mississippi
- Coordinates: 31°44′46″N 91°11′35″W
- Area: 15 acres (6.1 ha)
- Built: 1791
- NRHP reference No.: 71000454
- Added to NRHP: November 23, 1971

Springfield Plantation is an antebellum house located near Fayette in Jefferson County, Mississippi. It has been associated with many famous people throughout its history.

== History ==
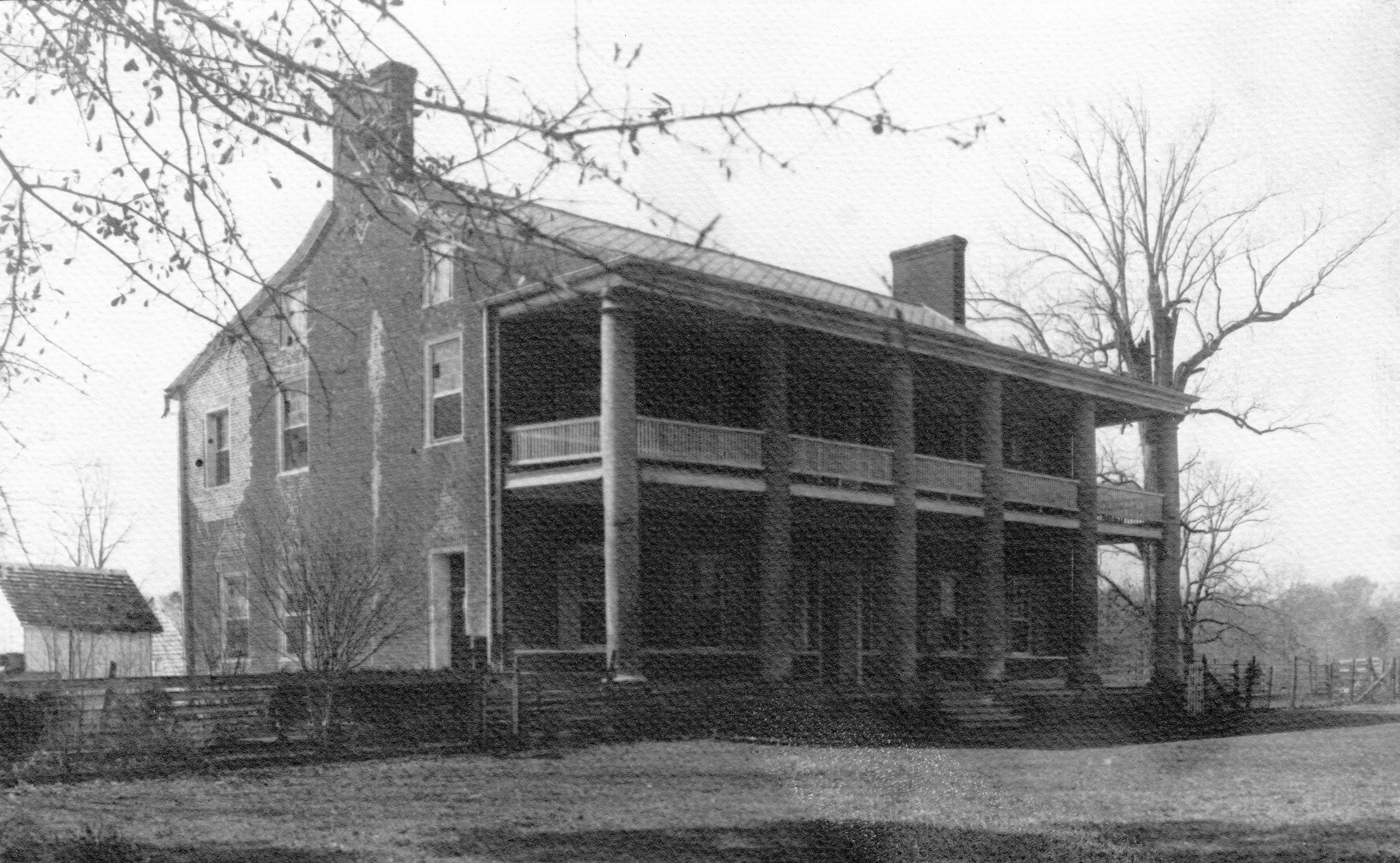
Springfield, circa 1936–1941

One of the oldest mansions in Mississippi, the Springfield Mansion was built between 1786 and 1791. The original plantation had over 3,000 acres (12 km^{2}) and was purchased by Thomas M. Green Jr., a wealthy Virginia planter, in 1784. Green had the house built to show off his wealth. The mansion was one of the first houses in America to have a full colonnade across the entire facade and is the first such mansion to be built in the Mississippi Valley. The whole house was built by his slaves out of clay from the land. The hinges, knobs, and all metal tools were built at the plantation's blacksmith building.

Possibly what makes Springfield Plantation most famous is the claim that a wedding that took place there in 1791. Thomas M. Green Sr., the owner's father, was one of the magistrates of the Mississippi Territory and as such, performed the marriage ceremony of Andrew Jackson and Rachel Donelson at the house in August 1791. However, this date and location is disputed, and there is no documentary evidence that the marriage took place at Springfield or even that it took place at all in Mississippi or elsewhere prior to Rachel's legal divorce from Lewis Robards in 1794.

According to Southern chronicler Harnett T. Kane, "...the Greens, also went from the Natchez vicinity, leaving their Springfield, a mellowed place of thick red walls and white columns. Toward the bases of the shafts the colors fade; there is a hint of red through the white, and the rich mold-green that only the years can bring are marks of honorable age. But the crowded life of the Greens has no modern counterpart. The house stands in a district of deserted sites that time has left behind."

== Restoration ==
After numerous owners over the years, the house decayed for decades. Arthur Edward Cavalier de LaSalle, Arthur LaSalle as he liked to be called, was given a lifetime lease of the home by the owners to repair, live in, and give tours of the mansion in the early 1970s. When asked about the mansion when he first arrived, he said, "It was occupied by the rats and pigeons, nothing else." Springfield is still a working plantation. On August 14, 2008, LaSalle died there. The tours have stopped, but the owners say they will be restarted.

Road to Springfield Plantation.

== Cemetery ==
It is not known how many people are buried at the Green Family Cemetery at Springfield Plantation. These are the names of those known.

- Thomas M. Green Jr. (1758–1813)--Martha Kirland (1760–1805)
- Martha Wills Green (1783–1808)

== See also ==
- Robards–Donelson–Jackson relationship controversy

== Sources ==
- Springfield Plantation Tour
- Springfield Plantation Bio
- Location Details and Plantation Size
