= Fayette, Mississippi =

- City
- Location of Fayette, Mississippi

- Location in the United States
- Coordinates: 31°42′40″N 91°3′44″W
- Country: United States
- State: Mississippi
- County: Jefferson

Government
  - Type: Mayor-Alderman
  - Mayor: Londell Eanochs

Area
  - Total: 1.17 sq mi (3.04 km^{2})
  - Land: 1.17 sq mi (3.04 km^{2})
  - Water: 0 sq mi (0.00 km^{2})
- Elevation: 282 ft (86 m)

Population (2020)
  - Total: 1,445
  - Density: 1,229.1/sq mi (474.56/km^{2})
- Time zone: UTC-6 (Central (CST))
  - Summer (DST): UTC-5 (CDT)
- ZIP codes: 39069, 39081
- Area code: 601
- FIPS code: 28-24500
- GNIS feature ID: 0669927
- Website: Town of Fayette

Fayette is a city in Jefferson County, Mississippi, United States. As of the 2020 census, Fayette had a population of 1,445. It is the county seat of Jefferson County.

== History ==
In 1879, the Jesse James gang, based in Missouri, raided southwest Mississippi, robbing a store each in Washington and Fayette. The outlaws absconded with $2,000 cash in the second robbery and took shelter in abandoned cabins on the Kemp Plantation south of St. Joseph, Louisiana. A posse attacked and killed two of the outlaws but failed to capture the entire gang. Jesse James and most of his gang succeeded in returning to Missouri. He was killed three years later in 1882 at his home in St. Joseph, Missouri.

In 1890, the white Democrat-controlled Mississippi legislature passed a new constitution, which effectively disenfranchised most black people in the state, crippling their integration into society and the Republican Party of the time.

After Congressional passage of the Voting Rights Act of 1965, black people began to register and vote again. Charles Evers was elected as mayor in 1969 by the people of Fayette; he was the first African-American mayor elected in post-Reconstruction Mississippi. He beat the white incumbent R.G. Allen, 386 votes –225 votes. Evers was an activist and the brother of slain civil rights leader Medgar Evers, head of the Mississippi chapter of the NAACP when he was assassinated in 1963.

== Geography ==
Fayette is located at 31°42′40″N 91°3′44″W (31.711144, -91.062246).

According to the United States Census Bureau, the city has a total area of 1.2 square miles (3.1 km^{2}), all land.

== Demographics ==
Historical population
Census	Pop.	Note	%±
1850	210		—
1860	339		61.4%
1870	120		−64.6%
1880	369		207.5%
1900	604		—
1910	775		28.3%
1920	840		8.4%
1930	848		1.0%
1940	907		7.0%
1950	1,498		65.2%
1960	1,626		8.5%
1970	1,725		6.1%
1980	2,033		17.9%
1990	1,853		−8.9%
2000	2,242		21.0%
2010	1,614		−28.0%
2020	1,445		−10.5%
U.S. Decennial Census

=== 2020 census ===
Fayette city, Mississippi – Racial and ethnic composition Note: the US Census treats Hispanic/Latino as an ethnic category. This table excludes Latinos from the racial categories and assigns them to a separate category. Hispanics/Latinos may be of any race.
Race / Ethnicity (NH = Non-Hispanic)	Pop 2000	Pop 2010	Pop 2020	% 2000	% 2010	% 2020
White alone (NH)	43	26	15	1.92%	1.61%	1.04%
Black or African American alone (NH)	2,170	1,577	1,379	96.79%	97.71%	95.43%
Native American or Alaska Native alone (NH)	2	3	1	0.09%	0.19%	0.07%
Asian alone (NH)	5	0	5	0.22%	0.00%	0.35%
Native Hawaiian or Pacific Islander alone (NH)	0	0	2	0.00%	0.00%	0.14%
Other race alone (NH)	0	0	0	0.00%	0.00%	0.00%
Mixed race or Multiracial (NH)	8	5	16	0.36%	0.31%	1.11%
Hispanic or Latino (any race)	14	3	27	0.62%	0.19%	1.87%
Total	2,242	1,614	1,445	100.00%	100.00%	100.00%

As of the 2020 United States census, there were 1,445 people, 510 households, and 291 families residing in the city.

== Education ==
The city of Fayette is served by the Jefferson County School District.

== Notable people ==
- Albert Clark, Negro league outfielder
- Charles Evers, first post-Reconstruction African-American mayor in Mississippi
- Thomas M. Green Jr., member of the U.S. House of Representatives from 1802 to 1803. Built Springfield Plantation in Fayette.
- Dudley Guice Jr., former National Football League wide receiver
- Alvin Hall, former defensive back for the Los Angeles Rams
- Richard H. Truly, administrator of NASA
- Thomas M. Wade, Louisiana state representative
