= Jefferson County, Mississippi =

County in Mississippi, United States

- County
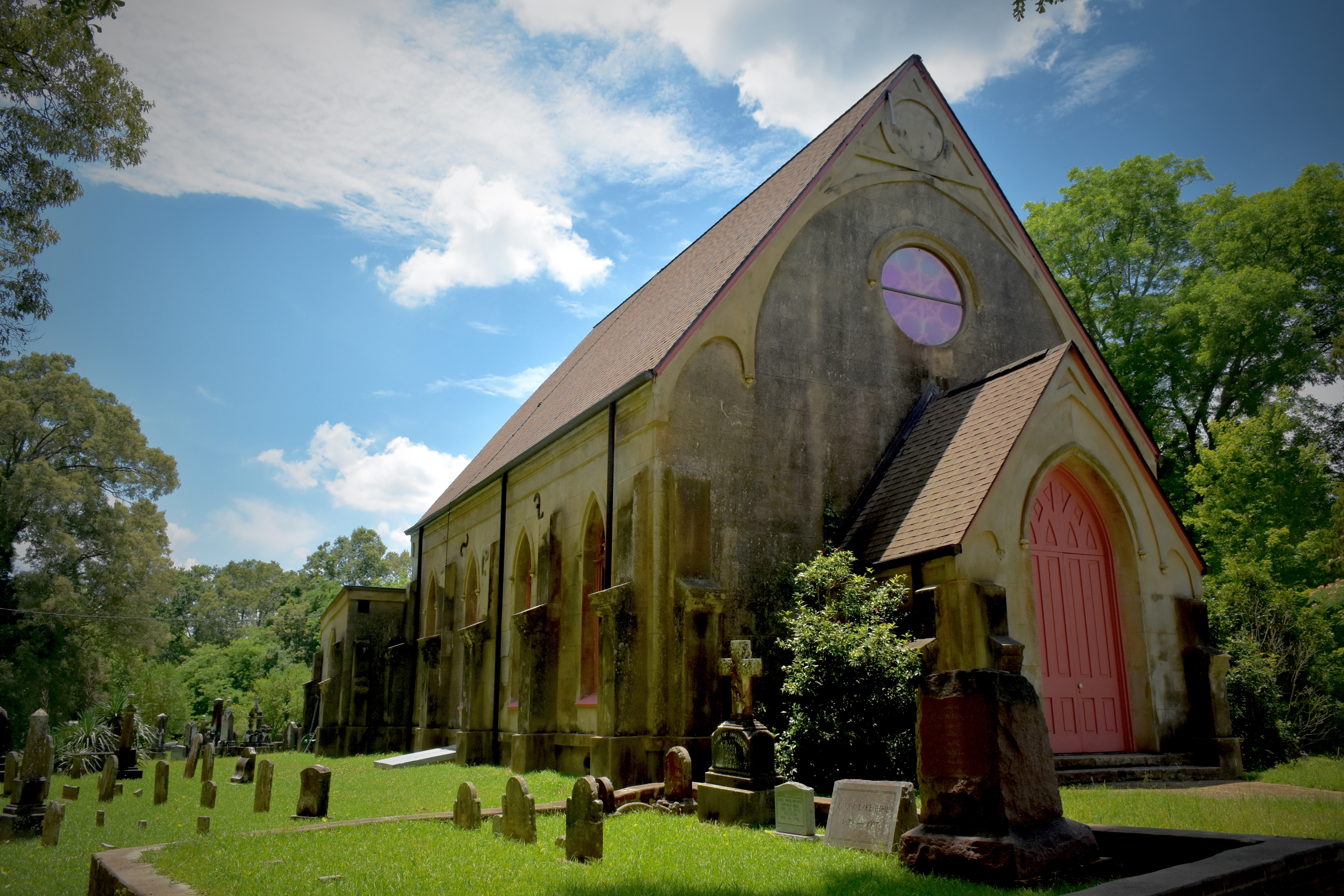
- Historic Christ Church, Church Hill, Mississippi.

- Location within the U.S. state of Mississippi
- Coordinates: 31°44′N 91°02′W
- Country: United States
- State: Mississippi
- Founded: 1799
- Named for: Thomas Jefferson
- Seat: Fayette
- Largest city: Fayette

Area
  - Total: 527 sq mi (1,360 km^{2})
  - Land: 520 sq mi (1,300 km^{2})
  - Water: 7.3 sq mi (19 km^{2}) 1.4%

Population (2020)
  - Total: 7,260
  - Estimate (2025): 6,825 ▼
  - Density: 14/sq mi (5.4/km^{2})
- Time zone: UTC−6 (Central)
  - Summer (DST): UTC−5 (CDT)
- Congressional district: 2nd
- Website: www.jeffersoncountyms.com

Jefferson County is a county located in the U.S. state of Mississippi; its western border is formed by the Mississippi River. As of the 2020 census, the population was 7,260, making it the fourth-least populous county in Mississippi. Until 1825, its first county seat was located at Old Greenville, which no longer exists, before moving to Fayette. The county is named for U.S. President Thomas Jefferson. One of the first of two counties organized in the Mississippi Territory in 1798 along with Adams County, it was first named Pickering County and included what would become Claiborne County. Originally developed as cotton plantations in the antebellum era, the rural county has struggled with a declining economy and reduced population since the mechanization of agriculture and urbanization of other areas. In 2020, its population of 7,260 was roughly one-third of the population peak in 1900. Within the United States, in 2009 rural Jefferson County had the highest percentage of African-Americans of any county. It was the fourth-poorest county in the nation.

== Geography ==
According to the U.S. Census Bureau, the county has a total area of 527 square miles (1,360 km^{2}), of which 520 square miles (1,300 km^{2}) is land and 7.3 square miles (19 km^{2}) (1.4%) is water.

=== Major highways ===
- U.S. Highway 61
- Mississippi Highway 28
- Mississippi Highway 33

=== Adjacent counties ===
- Claiborne County (north)
- Copiah County (northeast)
- Lincoln County (southeast)
- Franklin County (south)
- Adams County (southwest)
- Tensas Parish, Louisiana (west)

=== National protected areas ===
- Homochitto National Forest (part)
- Natchez Trace Parkway (part)

== Demographics ==
Historical population
| Census | Pop. | Note | %± |
|---|---|---|---|
| 1800 | 2,940 | | — |
| 1810 | 4,001 | | 36.1% |
| 1820 | 6,822 | | 70.5% |
| 1830 | 9,755 | | 43.0% |
| 1840 | 11,650 | | 19.4% |
| 1850 | 13,193 | | 13.2% |
| 1860 | 15,349 | | 16.3% |
| 1870 | 13,848 | | −9.8% |
| 1880 | 17,314 | | 25.0% |
| 1890 | 18,947 | | 9.4% |
| 1900 | 21,292 | | 12.4% |
| 1910 | 18,221 | | −14.4% |
| 1920 | 15,946 | | −12.5% |
| 1930 | 14,291 | | −10.4% |
| 1940 | 13,969 | | −2.3% |
| 1950 | 11,306 | | −19.1% |
| 1960 | 10,142 | | −10.3% |
| 1970 | 9,295 | | −8.4% |
| 1980 | 9,181 | | −1.2% |
| 1990 | 8,653 | | −5.8% |
| 2000 | 9,740 | | 12.6% |
| 2010 | 7,726 | | −20.7% |
| 2020 | 7,260 | | −6.0% |
| 2025 (est.) | 6,825 | ▼ | −6.0% |
U.S. Decennial Census; 1790-1960 1900-1990; 1990-2000 2010-2013

=== 2020 census ===
Jefferson County, Mississippi – Racial and ethnic composition Note: the US Census treats Hispanic/Latino as an ethnic category. This table excludes Latinos from the racial categories and assigns them to a separate category. Hispanics/Latinos may be of any race.
| Race / Ethnicity (NH = Non-Hispanic) | Pop 1980 | Pop 1990 | Pop 2000 | Pop 2010 | Pop 2020 | % 1980 | % 1990 | % 2000 | % 2010 | % 2020 |
|---|---|---|---|---|---|---|---|---|---|---|
| White alone (NH) | 1,627 | 1,174 | 1,263 | 1,056 | 891 | 17.72% | 13.57% | 12.97% | 13.67% | 12.27% |
| Black or African American alone (NH) | 7,431 | 7,430 | 8,373 | 6,601 | 6,138 | 80.94% | 85.87% | 85.97% | 85.44% | 84.55% |
| Native American or Alaska Native alone (NH) | 2 | 2 | 8 | 13 | 10 | 0.02% | 0.02% | 0.08% | 0.17% | 0.14% |
| Asian alone (NH) | 5 | 4 | 10 | 2 | 14 | 0.05% | 0.05% | 0.10% | 0.03% | 0.19% |
| Native Hawaiian or Pacific Islander alone (NH) | x | x | 1 | 1 | 5 | x | x | 0.01% | 0.01% | 0.07% |
| Other race alone (NH) | 1 | 0 | 0 | 2 | 5 | 0.01% | 0.00% | 0.00% | 0.03% | 0.07% |
| Mixed race or Multiracial (NH) | x | x | 21 | 23 | 123 | x | x | 0.22% | 0.30% | 1.69% |
| Hispanic or Latino (any race) | 115 | 43 | 64 | 28 | 74 | 1.25% | 0.50% | 0.66% | 0.36% | 1.02% |
| Total | 9,181 | 8,653 | 9,740 | 7,726 | 7,260 | 100.00% | 100.00% | 100.00% | 100.00% | 100.00% |

=== 2020 census ===
As of the 2020 census, the county had a population of 7,260. The median age was 40.5 years. 23.2% of residents were under the age of 18 and 17.1% of residents were 65 years of age or older. For every 100 females there were 95.1 males, and for every 100 females age 18 and over there were 93.8 males age 18 and over.

The racial makeup of the county was 12.3% White, 85.3% Black or African American, 0.2% American Indian and Alaska Native, 0.2% Asian, 0.1% Native Hawaiian and Pacific Islander, 0.1% from some other race, and 1.8% from two or more races. Hispanic or Latino residents of any race comprised 1.0% of the population.

<0.1% of residents lived in urban areas, while 100.0% lived in rural areas.

There were 2,865 households in the county, of which 32.3% had children under the age of 18 living in them. Of all households, 27.1% were married-couple households, 24.6% were households with a male householder and no spouse or partner present, and 43.8% were households with a female householder and no spouse or partner present. About 34.2% of all households were made up of individuals and 13.4% had someone living alone who was 65 years of age or older.

There were 3,346 housing units, of which 14.4% were vacant. Among occupied housing units, 73.4% were owner-occupied and 26.6% were renter-occupied. The homeowner vacancy rate was 1.9% and the rental vacancy rate was 7.3%.

== Education ==
Jefferson County School District operates public schools in all of the county.

It is in the district of Copiah–Lincoln Community College, and has been since 1967.

== Communities ==
=== City ===
- Fayette (county seat)

=== Unincorporated communities ===
- Cannonsburg
- Church Hill
- Harriston
- Lorman
- McBride
- Red Lick
- Union Church

=== Ghost towns or defunct ===
- Ashland (or Ashland Landing)
- Cane Ridge
- Coon Box
- Gum Ridge
- Old Greenville
- Rodney
- Shankstown
- Uniontown

== Politics ==
Jefferson County is overwhelmingly Democratic, and has supported Democratic candidates in presidential elections with at least 80% of the vote since Bill Clinton in 1992, who won 79%. Republicans have not garnered even 25% of the vote in presidential elections since 1972 (when Jefferson was one of only three counties in Mississippi to vote for George McGovern).

The last Republican to win the county was Barry Goldwater. Although Goldwater lost nationally in a landslide, he carried the state of Mississippi (and also Jefferson County) in a landslide, winning over 87% of the vote and carrying every county. (Note: the statewide popular vote for Barry was 356,528, or 87.14%. Jefferson county saw 94.8% of its voters vote for Goldwater.) Jefferson County supported him with 95% of the vote. Goldwater's lopsided victory was the result of Mississippi's decades-long suppression of the voting rights of African Americans, which only began to be reversed with the passage of the Voting Rights Act of 1965. (Note: "Despite all of this progress, the South remained segregated, especially when it came to the polls, where African Americans faced violence and intimidation when they attempted to exercise their constitutional right to vote. Poll taxes and literacy tests designed to silence Black voters were common. Without access to the polls, political change in favor of civil rights was slow-to-non-existent. Mississippi was chosen as the site of the Freedom Summer project due to its historically low levels of African American voter registration; in 1962 less than 7 percent of the state's eligible Black voters were registered to vote.")

United States presidential election results for Jefferson County, Mississippi
| Year | Republican | | Democratic | | Third party(ies) | |
| Year | No. | % | No. | % | No. | % |
|---|---|---|---|---|---|---|
| 1912 | 2 | 0.46% | 408 | 94.66% | 21 | 4.87% |
| 1916 | 3 | 0.65% | 456 | 99.13% | 1 | 0.22% |
| 1920 | 14 | 3.15% | 430 | 96.63% | 1 | 0.22% |
| 1924 | 50 | 9.14% | 497 | 90.86% | 0 | 0.00% |
| 1928 | 63 | 7.05% | 830 | 92.95% | 0 | 0.00% |
| 1932 | 24 | 3.07% | 753 | 96.29% | 5 | 0.64% |
| 1936 | 9 | 1.01% | 884 | 98.88% | 1 | 0.11% |
| 1940 | 7 | 0.87% | 801 | 99.13% | 0 | 0.00% |
| 1944 | 25 | 3.16% | 766 | 96.84% | 0 | 0.00% |
| 1948 | 14 | 1.41% | 15 | 1.51% | 967 | 97.09% |
| 1952 | 610 | 53.09% | 539 | 46.91% | 0 | 0.00% |
| 1956 | 189 | 19.65% | 440 | 45.74% | 333 | 34.62% |
| 1960 | 137 | 12.52% | 229 | 20.93% | 728 | 66.54% |
| 1964 | 1,258 | 94.80% | 69 | 5.20% | 0 | 0.00% |
| 1968 | 147 | 4.35% | 2,121 | 62.75% | 1,112 | 32.90% |
| 1972 | 1,131 | 43.37% | 1,457 | 55.87% | 20 | 0.77% |
| 1976 | 782 | 22.83% | 2,562 | 74.78% | 82 | 2.39% |
| 1980 | 751 | 20.17% | 2,871 | 77.09% | 102 | 2.74% |
| 1984 | 856 | 21.88% | 3,049 | 77.94% | 7 | 0.18% |
| 1988 | 702 | 20.64% | 2,693 | 79.18% | 6 | 0.18% |
| 1992 | 562 | 15.96% | 2,796 | 79.39% | 164 | 4.66% |
| 1996 | 489 | 15.68% | 2,531 | 81.15% | 99 | 3.17% |
| 2000 | 600 | 17.61% | 2,786 | 81.75% | 22 | 0.65% |
| 2004 | 630 | 18.18% | 2,821 | 81.39% | 15 | 0.43% |
| 2008 | 551 | 12.30% | 3,883 | 86.71% | 44 | 0.98% |
| 2012 | 468 | 10.56% | 3,951 | 89.13% | 14 | 0.32% |
| 2016 | 490 | 12.69% | 3,337 | 86.45% | 33 | 0.85% |
| 2020 | 531 | 13.59% | 3,327 | 85.13% | 50 | 1.28% |
| 2024 | 541 | 16.40% | 2,727 | 82.66% | 31 | 0.94% |

== Notable people ==
- Abijah Hunt, merchant who lived in Old Greenville during the Territorial Period, and owned a chain of stores and public cotton gins along the Natchez Trace
- David Hunt, Antebellum planter who lived on Woodlawn Plantation in Jefferson County, and became one of 12 planter millionaires in the Natchez District before the American Civil War.
- Zachary Taylor, U.S. president, planter, and soldier who often stayed on his plantation, Cypress Grove in Jefferson County, between 1840 and 1848.

== See also ==
- Cypress Grove Plantation
- National Register of Historic Places listings in Jefferson County, Mississippi
- Prospect Hill Plantation
- Springfield Plantation (Fayette, Mississippi)
- Woodland Plantation (Church Hill, Mississippi)
- Woodlawn Plantation (Jefferson County, Mississippi)
- Wyolah Plantation
