= Mississippi Territory General Assembly =

Legislature, 1800–1817

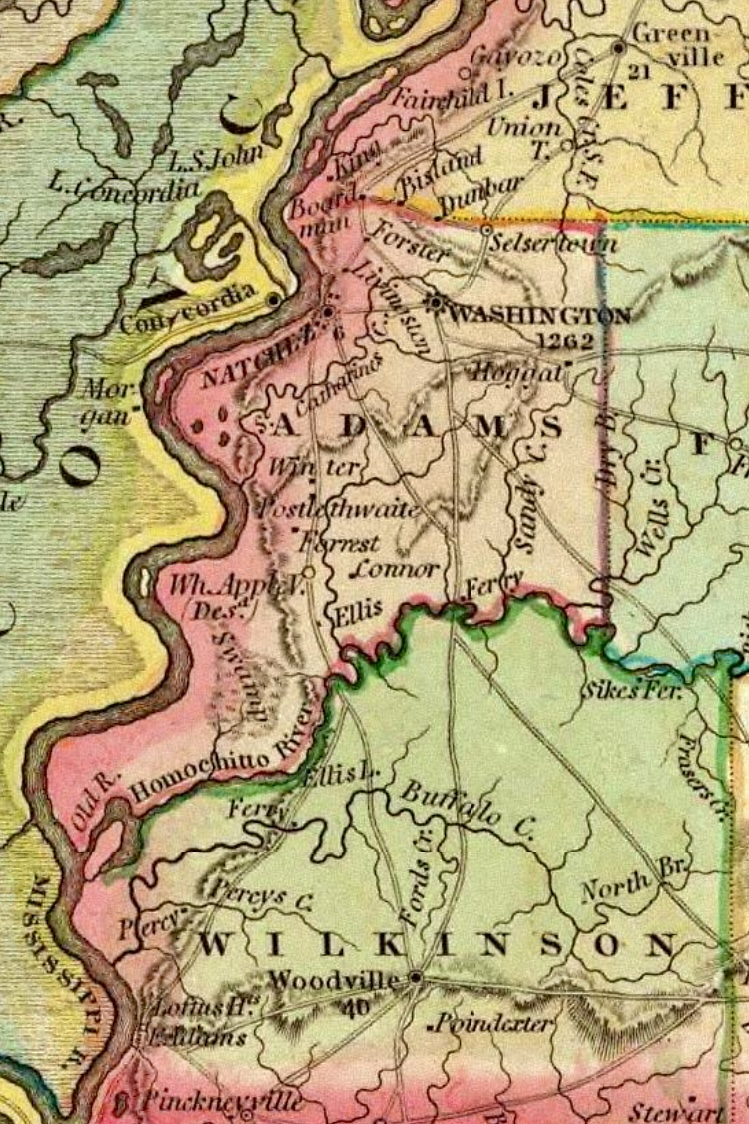
Detail from an 1823 map of Mississippi, showing the location of Washington, the territorial capital where the legislature held session

The Mississippi Territory General Assembly was the legislature of the Mississippi Territory of the United States.

Prior to the organization of Mississippi Territory, territorial governments had been based "an Act of Congress for the government of the North-Western Territory" and "this model was applied, without any material alteration, to the territories of Tennessee, Indiana, and Michigan," but "the first material change of this model was made for the Mississippi territory, where the people were entitled to a legislature of nine members, whatever might be the number of citizens. The next very important alteration occurred in 1804, in forming the government for the territory of Orleans, since constituted the state of Louisiana. The legislative council in this territory was to be appointed by the President, and formed the entire government. Even trial by jury, except in capital cases, was left at their option." As organized by the U.S. Congress in May 1800, there were to be four representatives from Adams County, four from Pickering County, and one each from the Tensaw and Tombigbee settlements "until the number of free male inhabitants of full age, in the Mississippi territory, shall amount to five thousand."

The General Assembly was bicameral, and the Legislative Council was the upper house, and the House of Representatives the lower. Initially, there were five members of the legislative council, and the number was increased to nine in 1814. The Assembly elected the Mississippi territorial delegate to the U.S. Congress until 1808 "when popular election of congressional delegates was instituted." The territorial assembly was succeeded by the Mississippi General Assembly at statehood in 1817.

== 1st General Assembly ==
First session: The first election of legislators was to be the "fourth Monday in July" 1800, and the first session was to begin in Natchez on "the fourth Monday in September." The first election, in 1800, resulted in the apparent election of Cato West, Thomas M. Green, John Burnet, Thomas Calvet, Henry Hunter and James Hoggett, but the latter two, along with Anthony Hutchins and William Dunbar were not seated, on the grounds of "improper credentials" and/or incomplete returns. A petition was sent to Congress asking for intervention was declined. President John Adams made nominations for the legislative council on December 23, 1800.

Third session: Met at Washington on May 3, 1802; printed a report. Joshua Baker is listed as a Speaker of the House in one account.

Possible members, per Adams presidential papers and Statistical Register of Mississippi (1924):

=== Legislative council ===
- Adam Bingaman
- John Ellis
- John Stampley
- Alexander Montgomery
- Flood McGrew

=== House of Representatives ===
County	Representative(s)
Adams County, Mississippi Territory	Sutton Banks
Adams County, Mississippi Territory	James Hoggatt
Adams County, Mississippi Territory	Henry Hunter
Adams County, Mississippi Territory	Anthony Hutchins
Pickering County, Mississippi Territory	Thomas Calvit
Pickering County, Mississippi Territory	Thomas M. Green Jr.
Pickering County, Mississippi Territory	Cato West

== 2nd General Assembly ==
First session: The second meeting of the General Assembly was conducted for about five weeks beginning in July 1801. Bibliographer McMurtrie reports that the second session met December, 1802, to March, 1803.

Second session: Incoming Governor W. C. C. Claiborne addressed the General Assembly on December 1, 1801. The legislature remained in session until February 2, 1802, repealed many existing laws, tried and failed to pass a law prohibiting the importation of male slaves over 16, changed the name of Pickering County to Jefferson, and created Claiborne and Wilkinson counties. Most significantly they voted to move the territorial capital from Natchez to Washington, about six miles up the Natchez Trace.

The Assembly met again in October 1803, as a total body of nine people. John Ellis headed the Legislative Council. William Conner was the speaker of the house. A report from this session was published by Andrew Marschalk.

Possible members, per the Mississippi Statistical Register of 1924:

=== Legislative Council ===
- David Latimore

=== House of Representatives ===
County	Representative(s)
Adams County, Mississippi Territory	William Conner
Adams County, Mississippi Territory	William Dunbar
Adams County, Mississippi Territory	William Gordon Forman
Adams County, Mississippi Territory	James Hoggatt
Jefferson County, Mississippi Territory	John Brooks
Jefferson County, Mississippi Territory	Roger Dixon
Jefferson County, Mississippi Territory	John Girault
Pickering County, Mississippi Territory	John Burnet
Pickering County, Mississippi Territory	Thomas Calvit
Pickering County, Mississippi Territory	Cato West
Washington County, Mississippi Territory	Nicholas Perkins

== 3rd General Assembly ==
The third legislature first met December 3, 1804. The session ended in March 1805. A report was published. March 1805 nominees for the legislative council: Daniel Burnet and William Downs of Claiborne County, Thomas Hinds and James Stewart of Jefferson County, Alexander Montgomery and Joseph Sessions of Adams County, Henry Hunter and Joshua Baker of Wilkinson County, and Lemuel Henry and William Buford of Washington County.

Extra session: A report from an extra session held in July 1805 was published by the Terrell brothers in Natchez.

Joseph B. Baker served on the legislative council from 1805 to 1808.

Possible members, per the Mississippi Statistical Register of 1924:

=== House of Representatives ===
County	Representative(s)
Adams County, Mississippi Territory	F. L. Claiborne
Adams County, Mississippi Territory	Lyman Harding
Adams County, Mississippi Territory	Philander Smith
Adams County, Mississippi Territory	John Steele
Jefferson County, Mississippi Territory	Joseph Dunbar
Jefferson County, Mississippi Territory	John Shaw
Washington County, Mississippi Territory	John Caller

== 4th General Assembly ==
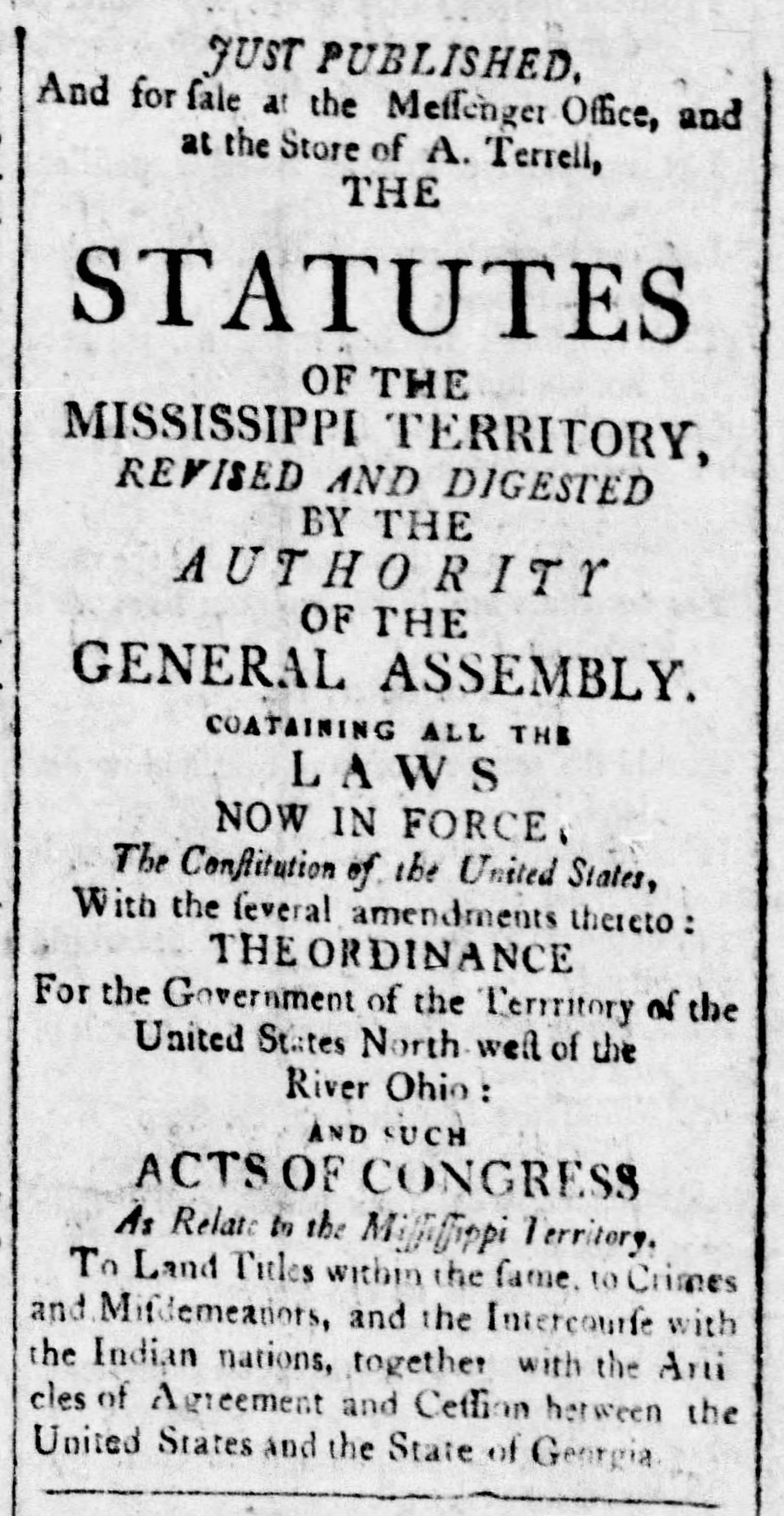
Statutes of the Mississippi Territory (1807)

Legislative council appointments published June 1806:

- Joshua Baker
- Joseph Sessions
- Thomas Hinds
- Daniel Burnet
- Lemuel Henry

Baker was president of the legislative council 1807 to 1809.

First session: A session of the general assembly was convened December 1, 1806. The session was continued to February 10, 1807. Joshua Baker was the president of the territorial legislative council in March 1808.

Second session: The second session of the fourth assembly was convened December first Monday, 1807.

New apportionment in 1808 allocated two representatives each to Claiborne, Jefferson, Adams, Wilkinson, and Washington counties.

The fourth legislature convened again in February, 1808, and "both houses were dissolved by the Governor Robert Williams on the 1st of March," with the apparent intent of "obliterating" the legislative council.

A session of the House of Representatives was convened September 15, 1808.

In November 1807 there was an election to replace Samuel Bridges, deceased.

=== House of Representatives ===
County	Representative(s)
ADAMS DISTRICT	John Ellis
ADAMS DISTRICT	Alexander Montgomery
ADAMS DISTRICT	George Poindexter
ADAMS DISTRICT	Henry Hunter
JEFFERSON DISTRICT	William Snodgrass
JEFFERSON DISTRICT	Thomas Fitzpatrick
JEFFERSON DISTRICT	George W. Humphries
JEFFERSON DISTRICT	Samuel Bridges

== 5th General Assembly ==
First session: The first session convened on February 5, 1809, and was dissolved by Governor Robert Williams on his resignation as governor on March 3, 1809.

In September 1809 Ferdinand L. Claiborne wrote Jefferson that Joshua Baker, Joseph Sessions, and Daniel Burnett had been recommended to the council.

In November 1808 Thomas Jefferson appointed John Flood McGrew, Thomas Calvit, James Lea, Alexander Montgomery, and Daniel Burnet, to the Mississippi Territory Legislative Council.

Daniel Burnet was president of the legislative council as of February 24, 1809.

== 6th General Assembly ==
The Mississippi Territory House of Representatives met July 3, 1809, and recommended the following membership for the legislative council, later approved by James Madison: Alexander Montgomery, Adams County; David McCaleb, Jefferson County; Thomas Barnes, Claiborne County; Joseph Carson, Washington County; Joseph Roberts, Wilkinson County.

First session: A report was published of acts passed at the session beginning November 6, 1809.

Second session: Convened November 5, 1810, adjourned January 1811, report published.

=== Legislative council ===
- Alexander Montgomery, Adams County
- David McCaleb, Jefferson County
- Thomas Barnes, Claiborne County
- Joseph Carson, Washington County
- Joseph Roberts, Wilkinson County

=== House of Representatives ===
Possible members, per the Mississippi Statistical Register of 1924:

County	Representative(s)
Adams County, Mississippi Territory	Joseph Bowman
Adams County, Mississippi Territory	Philip Hoggatt
Adams County, Mississippi Territory	Samuel Postlethwaite
Adams County, Mississippi Territory	Joseph Sessions
Adams County, Mississippi Territory	Philander Smith
Jefferson County, Mississippi Territory	H. J. Balch
Jefferson County, Mississippi Territory	Cowles Mead
Jefferson County, Mississippi Territory	John Girault
Claiborne County, Mississippi Territory	Allan Barnes
Amite County, Mississippi Territory	John Lowry
Amite County, Mississippi Territory	Lewis Perkins
Wayne County, Mississippi Territory	James Patton
Warren County, Mississippi Territory	Edward Turner
Franklin County, Mississippi Territory	George W. McConnell
Madison County, Mississippi Territory	Hugh McVay
Madison County, Mississippi Territory	Gabriel Moore
Madison County, Mississippi Territory	Peter Perkins
Washington County, Mississippi Territory	James Caller
Washington County, Mississippi Territory	William McGrew

== 7th General Assembly ==
There are two reports from the second session of the seventh assembly, convening November 4, 1812.

A letter from the Assembly to James Madison from December 1811 is signed by Cowles Mead, Speaker of the House, and Alexander Montgomery, president of the legislature.

=== House of Representatives ===
Possible members, per the Mississippi Statistical Register of 1924:

County	Representative(s)
Adams County, Mississippi Territory	Joseph Bowman
Adams County, Mississippi Territory	David Greenleaf
Adams County, Mississippi Territory	Philip Hoggatt
Adams County, Mississippi Territory	Samuel Montgomery
Adams County, Mississippi Territory	Joseph Sessions
Adams County, Mississippi Territory	William B. Shields
Adams County, Mississippi Territory	John Taylor
Adams County, Mississippi Territory	Nathaniel A. Ware
Jefferson County, Mississippi Territory	H. J. Balch
Jefferson County, Mississippi Territory	Cowles Mead
Jefferson County, Mississippi Territory	John Girault
Claiborne County, Mississippi Territory	Wilborn Briscoe
Claiborne County, Mississippi Territory	Daniel Burnet
Claiborne County, Mississippi Territory	Ralph Reagan
Amite County, Mississippi Territory	Henry Hanna
Amite County, Mississippi Territory	Lewis Perkins
Amite County, Mississippi Territory	Christopher Rankin
Wayne County, Mississippi Territory	James Patton
Wilkinson County, Mississippi Territory	John B. Posey
Wilkinson County, Mississippi Territory	Duncan Stewart
Warren County, Mississippi Territory	Henry D. Downs
Franklin County, Mississippi Territory	Bailey E. Chaney
Baldwin County, Mississippi Territory	Benjamin Baldwin
Mobile County, Mississippi Territory	William Crawford
Clarke County, Mississippi Territory	Reuben Saffold
Madison County, Mississippi Territory	James McCartney
Madison County, Mississippi Territory	Gabriel Moore
Marion County, Mississippi Territory & Hancock County, Mississippi Territory	Harmon Runnels

== 8th General Assembly ==
The first session of the eighth general assembly convened December 6, 1813.

The second session of the eighth general assembly convened November 7, 1814.

=== House of Representatives ===
County	Representative(s)
Adams County, Mississippi Territory	William Snodgrass
Adams County, Mississippi Territory	William B. Shields
Adams County, Mississippi Territory	Samuel Montgomery
Adams County, Mississippi Territory	John Taylor
Adams County, Mississippi Territory	David Greenleaf
Warren County, Mississippi Territory	Henry D. Downs
Madison County, Mississippi Territory (Note: This county was located on land that was set apart as Alabama Territory in 1817 and later became part of the U.S. state of Alabama.)	Gabriel Moore
Madison County, Mississippi Territory	Hugh McVay
Madison County, Mississippi Territory	James McCartney
Claiborne County, Mississippi Territory	Daniel Burnet
Jefferson County, Mississippi Territory	H. J. Balch
Franklin County, Mississippi Territory	Bailey E. Chaney
Wilkinson County, Mississippi Territory	D. Stewart
Amite County, Mississippi Territory	Christopher Rankin
Amite County, Mississippi Territory	Henry Hanna
Marion, Hancock Counties, M.T.	Harman Runnels
Washington County, Mississippi Territory	Samuel Smith
Wayne & Green Counties, M.T.	James Patton
Clarke County, Mississippi Territory	Reuben Stafford
Baldwin County, Mississippi Territory	B. Baldwin (Note: Possibly Benjamin Baldwin?)
Mobile & Jackson	Henry Toulmin

== 9th General Assembly ==
The first session of the ninth general assembly convened at Washington, M.T. on November 6, 1815. The legislative council had six members.

The second session of the ninth general assembly convened November 4, 1816. This was the last session of the Mississippi territorial legislature.

=== Legislative Council ===
Members of the legislative council of the Ninth General Assembly of Mississippi included Thomas Barnes, president; Messrs. Carson, Grayson, Runnels, (Note: Possibly Harmon Runnels or one of his sons.) Titus, and Robert Beatty.

=== House of Representatives ===
County	Representative(s)
Madison County, Mississippi Territory	Gabriel Moore
Madison County, Mississippi Territory	Hugh McVay
Madison County, Mississippi Territory	William H. Winston
Claiborne County, Mississippi Territory	William Briscoe
Claiborne County, Mississippi Territory	James Wood
Jefferson County, Mississippi Territory	Joseph Dunbar
Jefferson County, Mississippi Territory	John Hopkins
Jefferson County, Mississippi Territory	Henry D. Downs
Adams County, Mississippi Territory	William D. Baker
Adams County, Mississippi Territory	Anthony Campbell
Adams County, Mississippi Territory	George Newman
Adams County, Mississippi Territory	Nathan Swayze
Adams County, Mississippi Territory	Edward Turner
Adams County, Mississippi Territory	James Campbell Wilkins
Franklin County, Mississippi Territory	John Shaw
Wilkinson County, Mississippi Territory	Gerard Branden
Wilkinson County, Mississippi Territory	William Brown
Amite County, Mississippi Territory	Henry Hanna
Amite County, Mississippi Territory	Jesse Winburne
Marion, Lawrence, and Hancock Counties, M.T.	John Bond Jr.
Washington County, Mississippi Territory	Josiah D. Lester
Greene and Wayne Counties, M.T.	Josiah Watts

== See also ==
- Category:Members of the Mississippi Territorial Legislature

== Sources ==
- McMurtrie, Douglas C. (1945). A Bibliography of Mississippi Imprints, 1798–1830. Heartman's Historical Series No. 69. Beauvoir Community, Mississippi: The Book Farm.
- Rowland, Dunbar (1925). History of Mississippi, the Heart of the South. Chicago & Jackson, Miss.: S. J. Clarke Pub. Co. pp. 370–371, 379–380.
