= Mississippi Territory =

Territory of the United States from 1798 to 1817

Territory of Mississippi
- Organized incorporated territory of United States
- 1798–1817
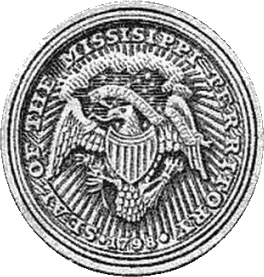
- Flag Seal

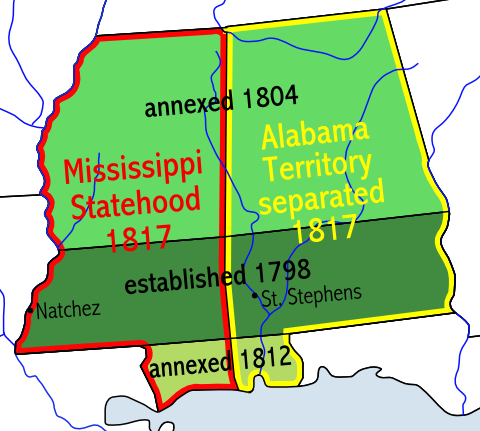
- Capital: Natchez (1798–1802); Washington (1802–1817)
- Government
  - Type: Organized incorporated territory
- History
  - Mississippi Organic Act passed: April 7, 1798 1798
  - Georgia recognizes its present borders: 1802
  - Georgia cession added to Mississippi Territory: 1804
  - Mobile District annexed: 1812
  - Alabama Territory created: August 15, 1817
  - Statehood: December 10, 1817 1817
Preceded by
Yazoo lands
Spanish West Florida
Republic of West Florida
Choctaw
Succeeded by
Mississippi
Territory of Alabama

Mississippi Organic Act
- Long title: An Act for an amicable settlement of limits with the state of Georgia, and authorizing the establishment of a government in the Mississippi territory
- Enacted by: the 5th United States Congress
- Effective: April 7, 1798

Citations
- Statutes at Large: 1 Stat. 549

Legislative history
- Signed into law by President John Adams on April 7, 1798

The Territory of Mississippi was an organized incorporated territory of the United States that was created under an organic act passed by the Congress of the United States. It was approved and signed into law by President John Adams on April 7, 1798.

The Territory was dissolved after 19 years on December 10, 1817, when the western half of the Territory was admitted to the Union as the new State of Mississippi. The eastern half was redesignated by Congress and 5th President James Monroe as the new Alabama Territory for the next two years, sandwiched between the new state of Mississippi in the west, Georgia to the east, Tennessee on the north, and to the south with a narrow strip of land to the Mobile Bay and Gulf of Mexico coast and further to the southeast of the western panhandle of the Royal Spanish colony of Spanish Florida in the Florida peninsula (future Florida Territory after 1819, and later state of Florida by 1845).

The Territory of Alabama was admitted to the Union as the State of Alabama on December 14, 1819. The Chattahoochee River played a significant role in the definition of the Territory's borders during its brief two years of existence, 1817–1819.

The population greatly increased in the southeast United States with movement and immigration from the East Coast along the Atlantic Ocean as it grew in the early 1800s from settlement, and American westward and southwestward expansion from the original Thirteen States, with cotton being an important cash crop.

== History ==
The United States and Spain disputed these lands east of the Mississippi River until Spain relinquished its claim with the Treaty of Madrid, initially signed in 1795 by the two countries' representatives. The Mississippi Territory was organized in 1798 from these lands, in an area extending from 31° N latitude to 32°28' North – or approximately the southern half of the present states of Alabama and Mississippi. The territorial capital was originally in Natchez, but was moved to Washington, six miles up the Natchez Trace, on February 1, 1802.

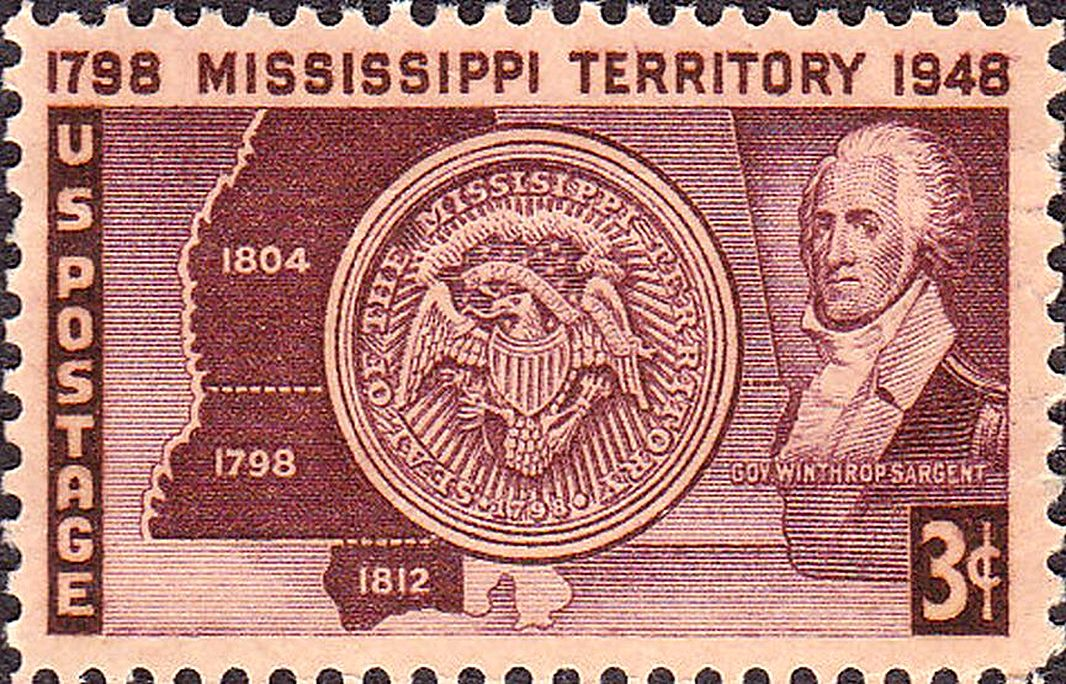
1948 postage stamp depicting the Mississippi Territory

The state of Georgia had maintained a claim over almost the entire area of the present states of Alabama and Mississippi (from 31° N to 35° N), until it surrendered its claim in 1802 following the Yazoo land scandal. In 1804, Congress extended the boundaries of the Mississippi Territory to include all of the Georgia cession.

Beginning about 1808 the legislature of the Mississippi Territory held its official meetings in one of the houses owned by Charles DeFrance of the Natchez District. The DeFrance house, also known as Assembly Hall, was located in Washington, Mississippi, about 10 miles from the city of Natchez.

In 1812, the US annexed the Mobile District of West Florida, between the Perdido River and the Pearl River. The U.S. declared that it had been included in the Louisiana Purchase (1803). But Spain disputed this and maintained its own claim over the area.

The following year, a Federal statute was secretly enacted authorizing the President to take full possession of this area with the use of military force ("and naval force") as deemed necessary. Accordingly, General James Wilkinson occupied this district with a military contingent; the Spanish colonial commandant offered no resistance. This annexation extended the Mississippi Territory south to the Gulf of Mexico, with the northern border being the boundary of the state of Tennessee, taking in all of what is now Alabama and Mississippi.

Federal statutes enacted on March 1 and 3, 1817, provided a plan for the division of the Mississippi Territory into the state of Mississippi in the west and the Alabama Territory in the east (with St. Stephens, on the Tombigbee River, as the temporary seat of the Alabama territorial government). On December 10, 1817, the division was finalized when the western portion was admitted to the Union as Mississippi, the 20th state.

== Borders ==
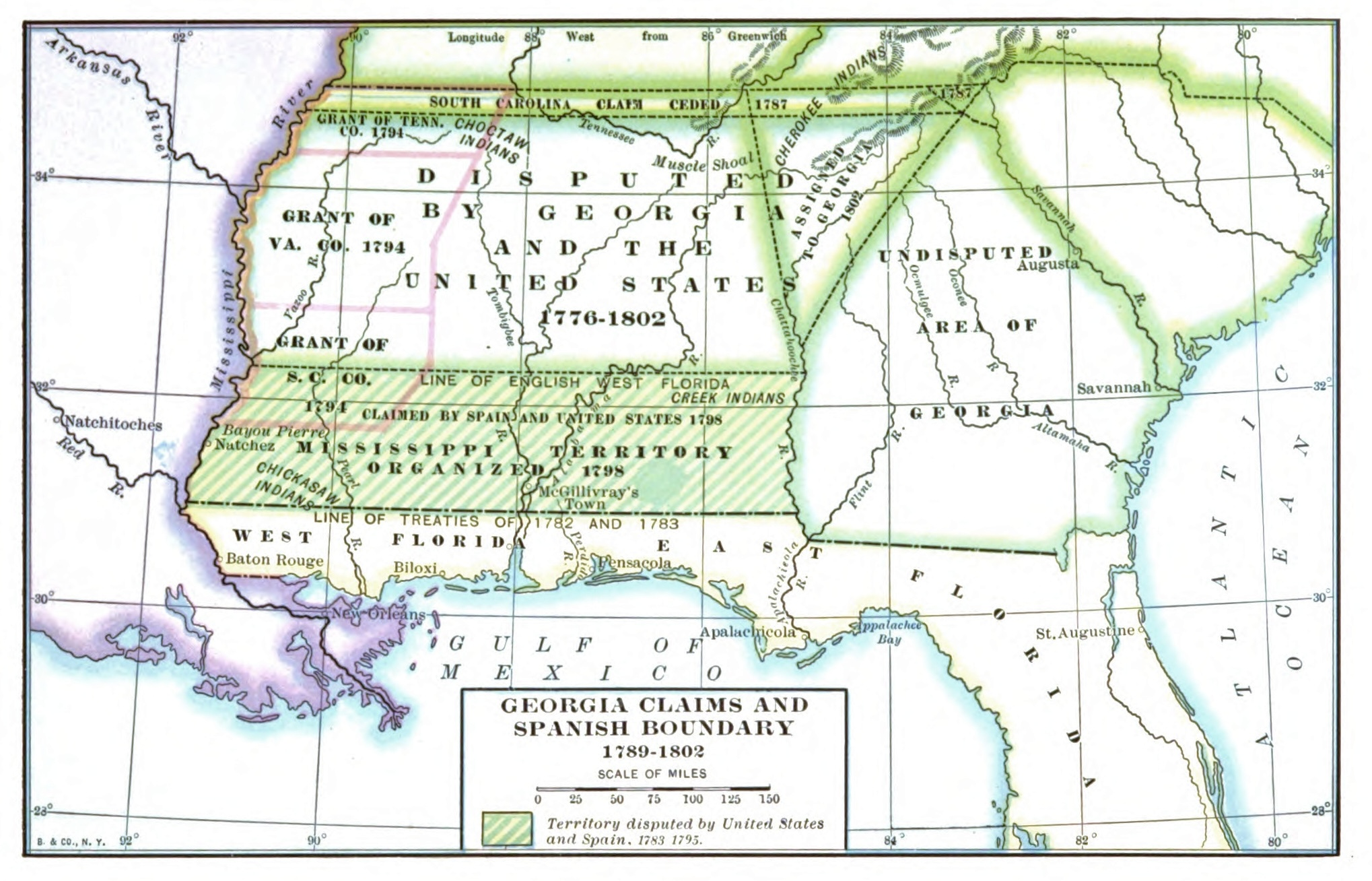
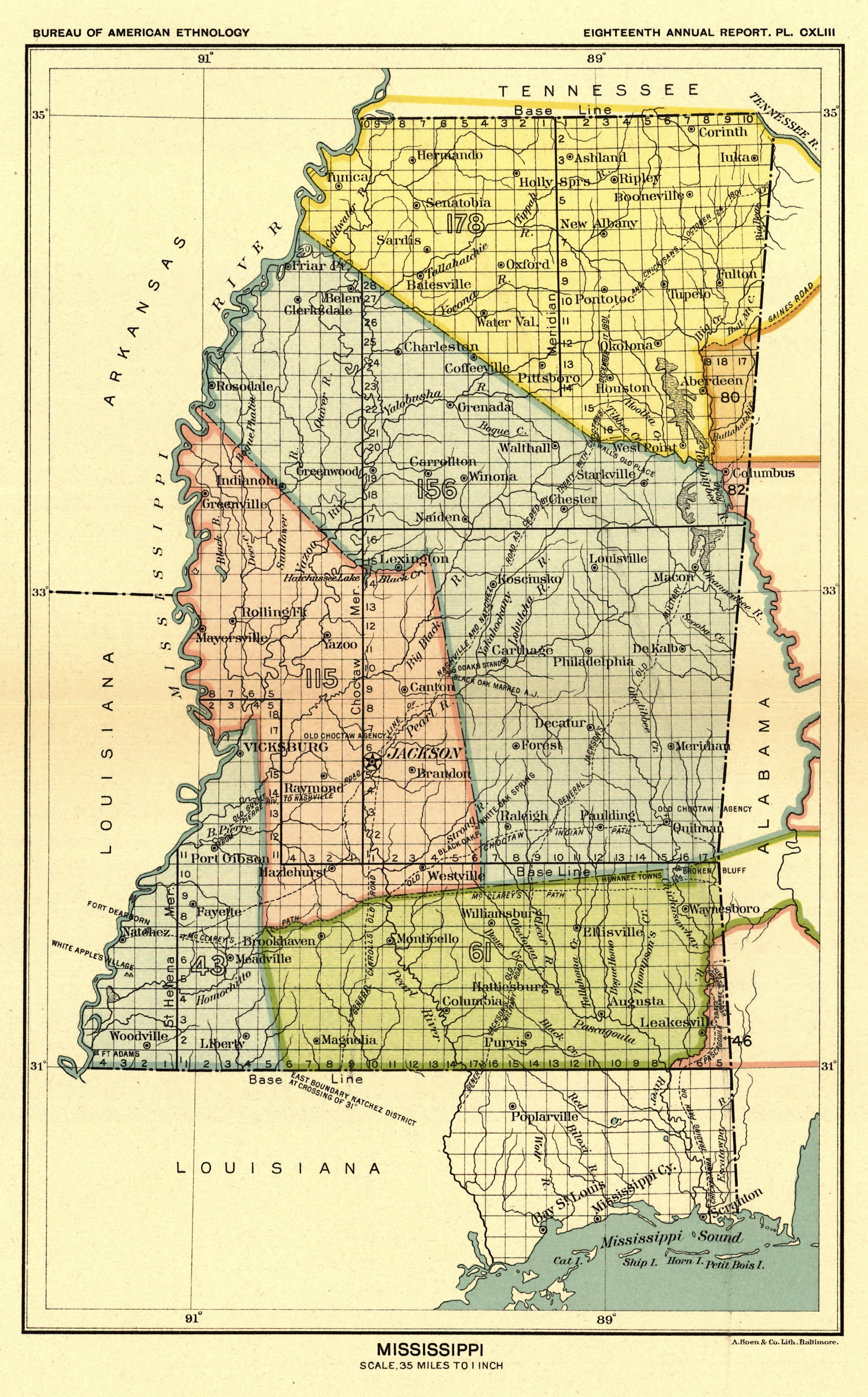
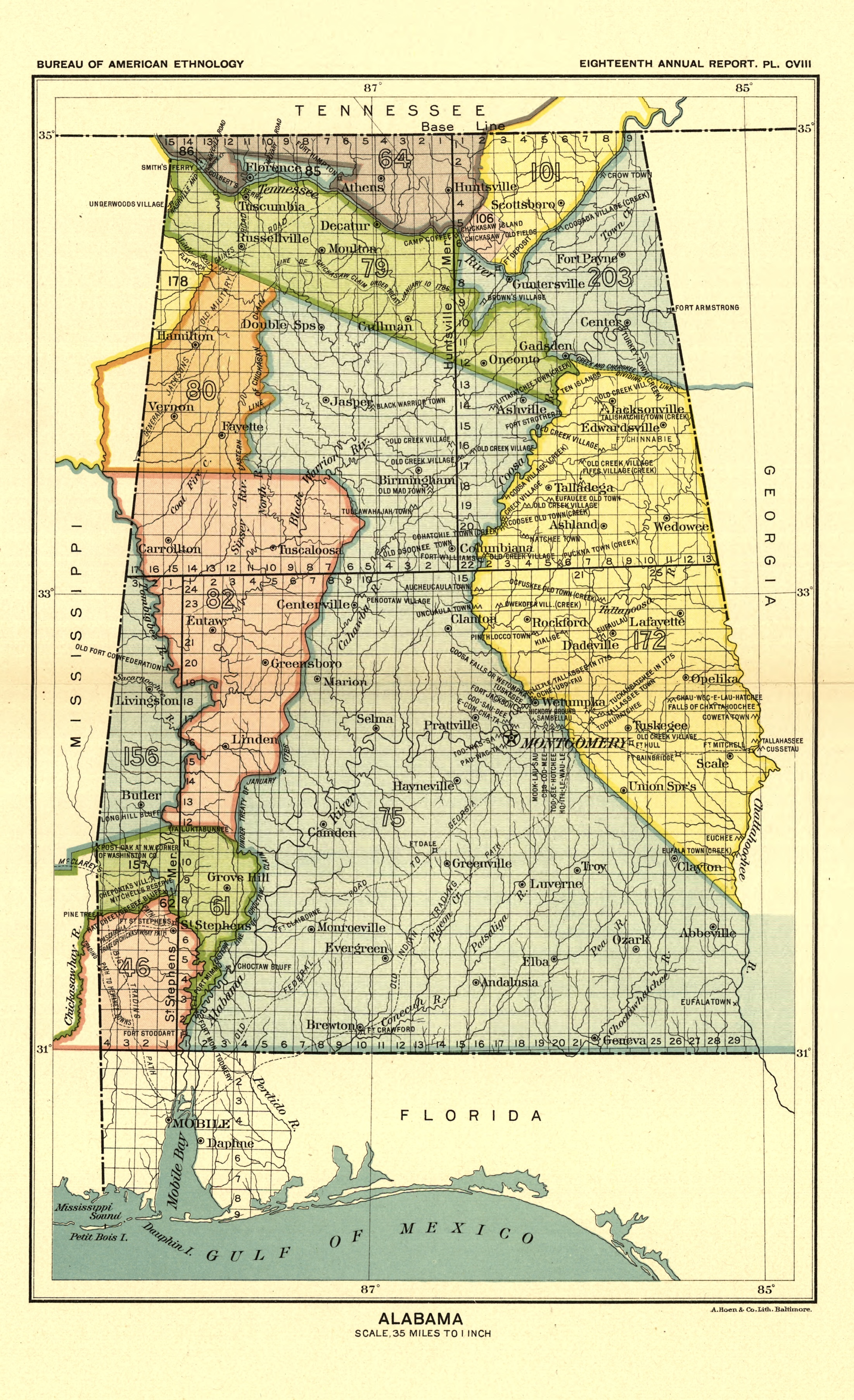
Borders of West Florida and other indigenous and colonial claims in 1767; Georgia claims and Spanish boundary, 1789–1802; Indian Land Cessions (1898) – Mississippi & Alabama

The final boundary between Georgia and Mississippi Territory was defined to follow the Chattahoochee River north from the border with Spanish Florida. However, the Chattahoochee's upper course veers northeast, deep into Georgia. So the boundary was defined to follow the river until it turned northeast, and from that point to follow a straight line north to the 35th parallel (whose role in state borders dates back to the split of North and South Carolina in 1730). The line was not run straight north but rather angled to meet the northern border of the territory one-third of the way west, leaving the other two-thirds for two future states, Alabama and Mississippi (their angled boundary stopped at the Tennessee River).

Congress delineated the boundary between Mississippi and Alabama by dividing the territory into approximately equal-sized parts, similar in size to Georgia. The agriculturally productive lands were divided by a straight line running south from the northwest corner of Washington County (as it was defined at the time) to the Gulf of Mexico. The border north of this point was angled westward to keep Mississippi and Alabama roughly equal in size. At its northern end, this angled border follows a short section of the Tennessee River. Congress chose this boundary because if the straight line had been run all the way to the Tennessee border Mississippi would have jurisdiction over a small piece of hilly land cut off from the rest of the state by the wide Tennessee River.

== Settlement ==
Historical population
Year	Pop.	±%
1800	8,850	—
1810	40,352	+356.0%
Source: 1800–1810 (includes Alabama and Mississippi);

The attraction of vast amounts of high quality, inexpensive cotton land attracted hordes of settlers, mostly from Georgia and the Carolinas, and from tobacco areas of Virginia and North Carolina at a time when growing tobacco barely made a profit. From 1798 through 1820, the population soared from less than 9,000 to more than 22,000. Migration came in two fairly distinct waves – a steady movement until the outbreak of the War of 1812, and a flood afterward from 1815 through 1819. The postwar flood was caused by various factors, including high prices for cotton, the elimination of Indian titles to much of the land, new and improved roads, and the acquisition of new direct outlets to the Gulf of Mexico. The first migrants were traders and trappers, then herdsmen, and finally planters. The uplands in the Southwest frontier developed a relatively democratic society.

In the 1810 United States census, 11 counties in the Mississippi Territory (8 in Mississippi and 3 in Alabama) reported the following population counts (after only three reported the following counts in the 1800 United States census):

1810 Rank	County	1800 Population	1810 Population
1	Adams	4,660	10,002
2	Wilkinson	–	5,068
3	Amite	–	4,750
4	Madison (Ala.)	–	4,699
5	Jefferson	2,940	4,001
6	Claiborne	–	3,102
7	Washington (Ala.)	1,250	2,920
8	Franklin	–	2,016
9	Baldwin (Ala.)	–	1,427
10	Wayne	–	1,253
11	Warren	–	1,114
	Mississippi Territory	8,850	40,352

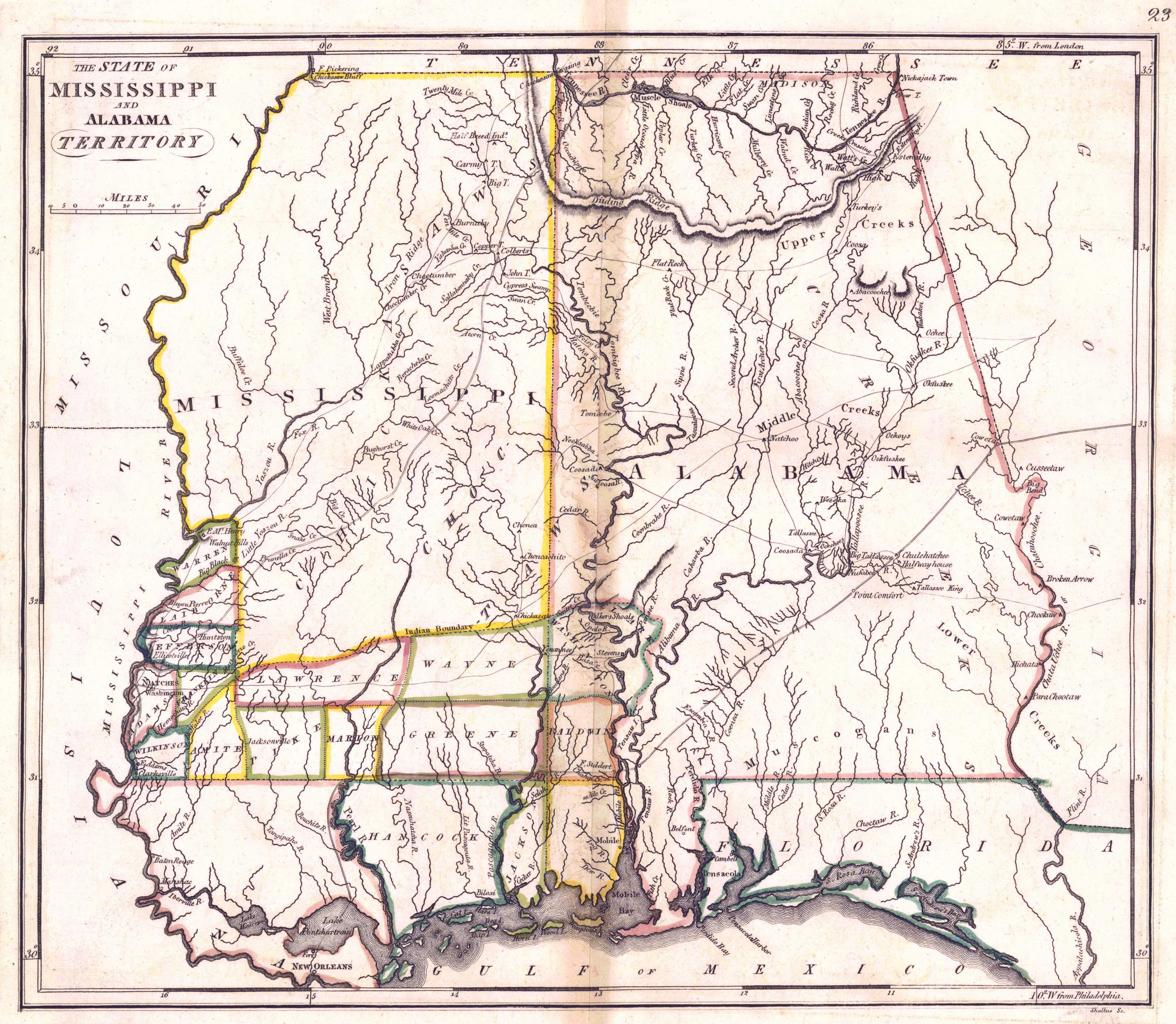
1817 map of Mississippi and Alabama Territory, showing counties at that time; most of the rest of the land was still titled to the Choctaw, Chickasaw, Cherokee, and Creek

At statehood in 1817 there were 14 counties: Adams, Claiborne, Jefferson (originally named Pickering), Wilkinson, Amite, Franklin, Warren, Wayne, Marion, Greene, Hancock, Jackson, Lawrence, and Pike.

=== Cotton ===
After 1800, the development of a cotton economy in the South changed the economic relationship of native Indians with whites and slaves in Mississippi Territory. As Native Americans ceded their lands to whites, they became more isolated from whites and blacks. A great wave of public sales of former Indian land plus white migration (with slaves) into Mississippi Territory guaranteed the dominance of the developing cotton agriculture.

=== Government ===
President John Adams appointed Winthrop Sargent as the first governor of the Mississippi Territory, effective from May 1798 to May 1801. William C. C. Claiborne (1775–1817), a lawyer and former Democratic-Republican Congressman from Tennessee (1797–1801), was governor and superintendent of Indian affairs in the Mississippi Territory from 1801 through 1803. Although he favored acquiring some land from the Choctaw and Chickasaw, Claiborne was generally sympathetic and conciliatory toward the Indians. He worked long and patiently to iron out differences that arose, and to improve the material well-being of the Indians. He was also partly successful in promoting the establishment of law and order, as when his offering of a two thousand dollar reward helped destroy a gang of outlaws headed by Samuel Mason (1750–1803). His position on issues indicated a national rather than regional outlook, though he did not ignore his constituents. Claiborne expressed the philosophy of the Republican Party and helped that party defeat the Federalists. When a smallpox epidemic broke out in the Spring of 1802, Claiborne's actions resulted in the first recorded mass vaccination in the territory and saved Natchez from the disease.

George Mathews, a former governor of Georgia, was appointed the governorship, though the appointment was revoked before he took office. The third governor was Robert Williams, serving from May 1805 to March 1809.

David Holmes was the last governor of the Mississippi Territory, 1809–17. Holmes was generally successful in dealing with a variety of matters, including expansion, land policy, Indians, the War of 1812, and the constitutional convention of 1817 (of which he was elected president). Often concerned with problems regarding West Florida, he had a major role in 1810 in negotiations which led to the peaceful occupation of part of that territory. McCain (1967) concludes that Holmes' success was not based on brilliance, but upon kindness, unselfishness, persuasiveness, courage, honesty, diplomacy, and intelligence.

The eastern half of the Mississippi Territory was labeled the Tombigbee District and later Washington County. Ignored by the territorial government, the inhabitants were beset by hostile neighbors, militant Indians, and the usual frontier problems of competing land claims and establishment of law. Solutions to these difficulties came slowly, and were not completely resolved when the territory gained statehood as the U.S. state of Alabama in 1819.

=== Law ===
English common law dominated the development of the judicial system in the Mississippi Territory. The citizenry considered the laws imposed by Winthrop Sargent, the territory's governor, as repressive and unconstitutional. 'Sargent's Code,' however unpopular, established the first court system for the territory and served as the precedent for later revisions. The area was in a dire need of competent judges at the end of the 18th century, at a time when the governor and three judges were supposed to write law to govern the new territory. In 1798, Sargent wrote to Timothy Pickering, Secretary of State, that this was his "great source of uneasiness"; he was anxiously awaiting the arrival of a new judge, William McGuire—but McGuire, who did not get to the territory in the fall of 1799, went back to his home in Virginia after only a couple of weeks. The two other judges were Daniel Tilton, a man who had never practiced law and may have studied law only for a year (he left after an early disagreement with the governor, returning later for a brief spell), and Peter Bryan Bruin, a merchant of whom Sargent said he was "a worthy and sensible man [but] beyond doubt deficient". "Aside from his innocence of legal knowledge, [he] was so often drunk or absent or both" (and had to resign to avoid impeachment), according to the reviewer of a 1954 study by William Baskerville Hamilton on Thomas Rodney, the federal judge who arrived in the territory in 1803 and helped organize it until his death in 1811.

An 1802 judiciary act considerably simplified the court system. Several judicial reorganization acts followed in 1805, 1809, and 1814, though a modified form of Sargent's county court system and the considerable power held by judges continued. While the credentials of the members of the first territorial court were questionable, the quality of judges in later courts steadily grew.

=== Religion ===
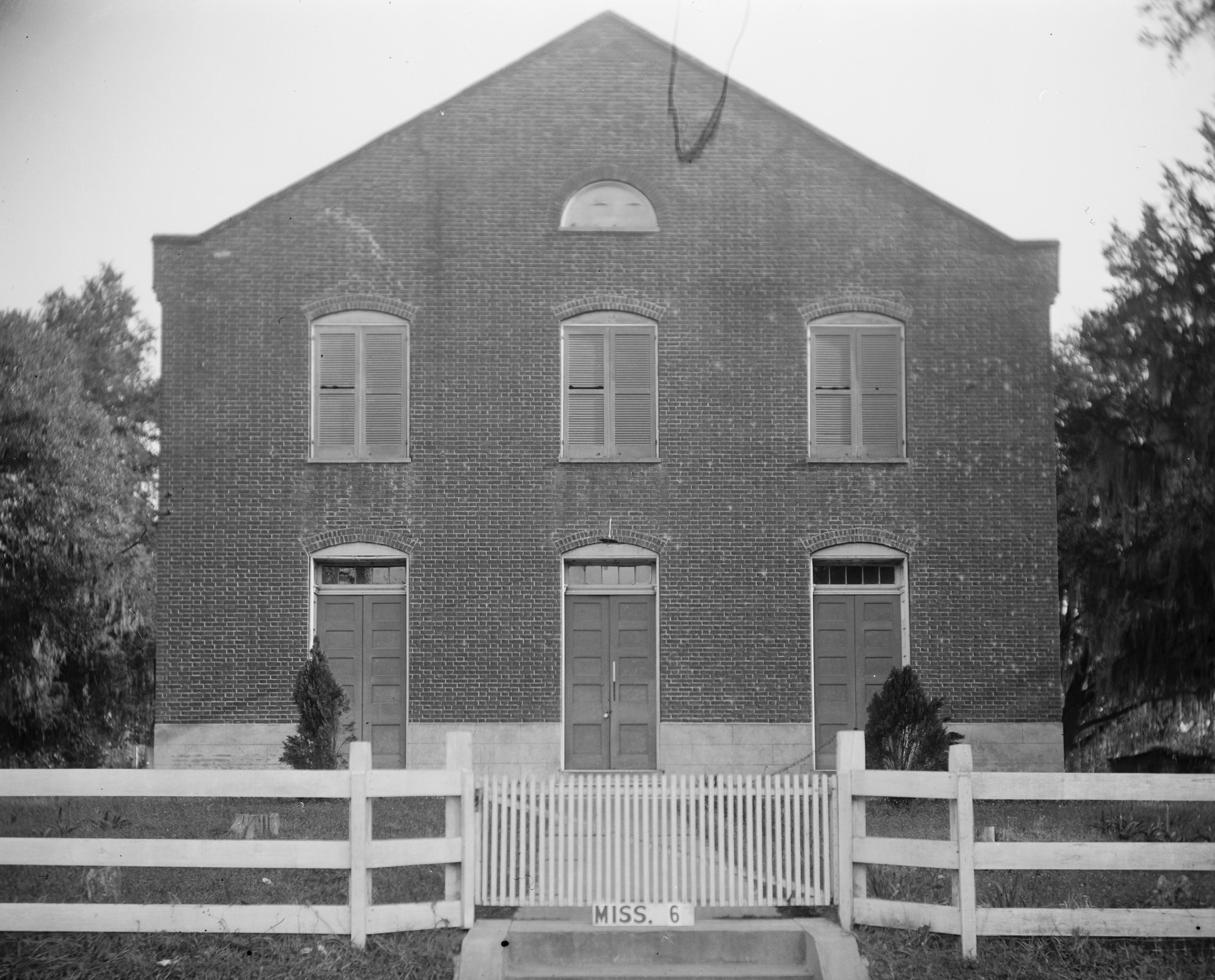
Washington Methodist Church organized in 1799; this building constructed 1828

While the Roman Catholic Church, planted during the French and Spanish colonial periods, was active along the coast, after 1799 more American Protestants entered the territory, bringing their religious varieties with them. Free thought, skepticism, deism, or indifference to religion were characteristic of the wealthy planters and land speculators, as newcomers were far more interested in seeking riches in this world than in the next. As the number of American migrants increased, Methodists, Baptists, and Presbyterians formed the three leading denominations in the territory. Protestant ministers won converts, often promoted education, and had some influence in improving the treatment of slaves.

=== War of 1812 ===
The people of the Mississippi Territory favored war with Britain in 1812. By 1810, belief in the national policy of economic coercion was waning in what was then called the Southwest, while desire for unrestricted trade and a vindication of national honor was rising, intermingled with desire for Spanish Florida. However, problems of land claims, Indians, internal improvements, and statehood issues continued to excite more local interest than the coming of war. Most saw no conflict between war issues and local interests; in fact, some foresaw war as a way of resolving certain local problems.

Following a successful attack on a white expedition at the Battle of Burnt Corn, the Red Sticks, a hostile faction of the Creeks, determined to attack and destroy Fort Mims in the eastern part Mississippi Territory (modern Alabama). Poor scouting, an attack at noon when most of the garrison was eating, seizure of the portholes by the Indians, and inability to close the main gates were all elements in the defeat on August 30, 1813. Of the 275 to 300 whites and multiracial people in Fort Mims at the time of the attack, between 20 and 40 escaped; therefore, about 235 to 260 whites and friendly Indians were killed in the battle. Creek losses were at least 100 killed.

The massacre had significant short- and long-range effects. It triggered a major Indian war that involved a substantial build-up of American military force in the area – which probably prevented the British from occupying an undefended Gulf coast in 1814. More importantly, relations between Americans and the southern Indians changed drastically. The Creeks, who had been living peacefully and in close contact with the settlers of the Mississippi Territory, lost more than half their land, and within twenty years were forced to move west of the Mississippi River.

Brigadier General Ferdinand L. Claiborne, commander of the Mississippi militia, was not to blame for the massacre, but Major Daniel Beasley was guilty of gross negligence. At the Battle of Horseshoe Bend on March 27, 1814, American forces and Indian allies under General Andrew Jackson defeated the Red Sticks, killing most of the warriors and sending the rest fleeing to Florida, where they joined the Seminole tribe.

== Public officials ==
=== Executive ===
Mississippi Territory was organized on April 7, 1798, from land ceded to the federal government by Georgia. It had four governors appointed by the president of the United States during its 19-year history, including one, David Holmes, who would later serve as state governor.

Governors of the Territory of Mississippi
No.	Governor	Term in office (Note: The range given is from the date the governor was confirmed by the Senate, or appointed by the President during a Senate recess, to the date the governor's successor was confirmed, unless noted.)	Appointed by
1	Winthrop Sargent (1753–1820)	May 7, 1798 (Note: George Mathews was nominated on April 18, 1798, but was withdrawn and Sargent nominated on May 2. He was confirmed by the Senate on May 7, and arrived in the territory on August 6.) – May 25, 1801 (1114 days; replaced)	John Adams
2	William C. C. Claiborne (d. 1817)	May 25, 1801 (Note: Claiborne was appointed on May 25, 1801, during a Senate recess; nominated on January 6, 1802; and confirmed by the Senate on January 26, 1802. He arrived in the territory on November 23, 1801.) – March 2, 1805 (1378 days; replaced)	Thomas Jefferson
3	Robert Williams (1770–1836)	March 2, 1805 (Note: Williams was nominated on March 1, 1805; confirmed by the Senate on March 2; and he arrived in the territory in May. He was reconfirmed by the Senate on March 14, 1808.) – March 7, 1809 (1467 days; replaced)	Thomas Jefferson
4	David Holmes (1769–1832)	March 7, 1809 (Note: Holmes was nominated on March 6, 1809; confirmed by the Senate on March 7; and he arrived in the territory on June 30. He was reconfirmed by the Senate on March 31, 1812, and December 10, 1814.) – October 7, 1817 (3137 days; elected state governor)	James Madison

=== Legislative ===
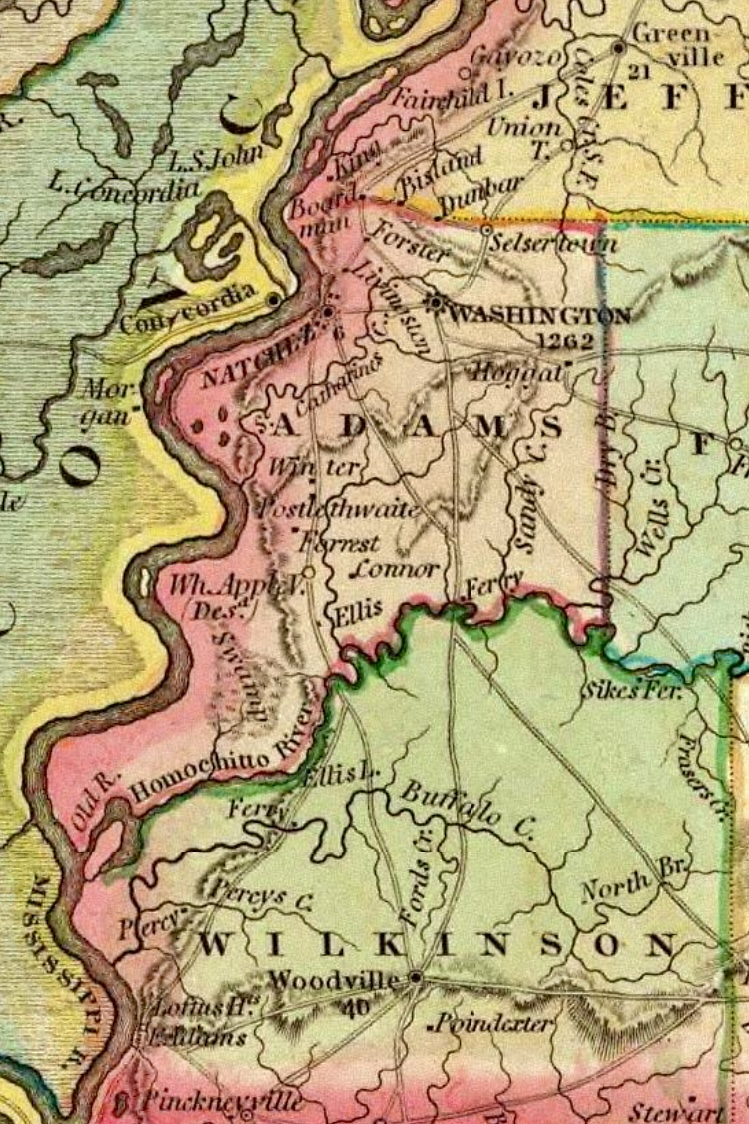
Detail from an 1823 map of Mississippi, showing the location of Washington, the territorial capital where the legislature held session

The Mississippi Territory General Assembly was the legislature of the Mississippi Territory of the United States.

Prior to the organization of Mississippi Territory, territorial governments had been based "an Act of Congress for the government of the North-Western Territory" and "this model was applied, without any material alteration, to the territories of Tennessee, Indiana, and Michigan," but "the first material change of this model was made for the Mississippi territory, where the people were entitled to a legislature of nine members, whatever might be the number of citizens. The next very important alteration occurred in 1804, in forming the government for the territory of Orleans, since constituted the state of Louisiana. The legislative council in this territory was to be appointed by the President, and formed the entire government. Even trial by jury, except in capital cases, was left at their option." As organized by the U.S. Congress in May 1800, there were to be four representatives from Adams County, four from Pickering County, and one each from the Tensaw and Tombigbee settlements "until the number of free male inhabitants of full age, in the Mississippi territory, shall amount to five thousand."

The General Assembly was bicameral, and the Legislative Council was the upper house, and the House of Representatives the lower. Initially, there were five members of the legislative council, and the number was increased to nine in 1814. The Assembly elected the Mississippi territorial delegate to the U.S. Congress until 1808 "when popular election of congressional delegates was instituted." The territorial assembly was succeeded by the Mississippi General Assembly at statehood in 1817.

==== Council presidents ====
Presidents of the Legislative Council, 1801–1817

- John Stampley, from 1801 to 1802
- John Ellis, from 1802 to 1807
- Joshua Baker, from 1807 to 1809
- Daniel Burnet, 1809
- James Lea, 1809
- Alexander Montgomery, 1809
- Thomas Barnes, from 1809 to 1810
- Alexander Montgomery, from 1810 to 1812
- Thomas Barnes, from 1812 to 1815
- James Titus, 1816 to 1817

==== Speakers ====
Speakers of the House of Representatives of Mississippi Territory, 1800–1817

- Henry Hunter, 1800 to 1803
- William Gordon Forman, 1803
- William Conner, 1803
- Nicholas Perkins, 1803
- William Dunbar, 1803
- Philander Smith, from 1804 to 1805
- John Steele, from 1805 to 1806
- John Ellis, from 1806 to 1808
- William Snodgrass, November, 1809
- Ferdinand L. Claiborne, February 1809
- Ferdinand L. Claiborne, 1809 to 1810
- Thomas Hinds (pro. tem.), 1810
- Ralph Rogers (pro. tem.), 1810
- Cowles Mead, from 1811 to 1813
- Daniel Burnet, from 1813 to 1815
- Gabriel Moore, from 1815 to 1817

=== Judiciary ===
The minute books for the Mississippi Territory courts for 1799–1803 and 1805–1809 were found at an estate sale in March 2024. The administrator of the estate donated the books to the Mississippi state law library. The books are available as PDF-format documents.

The territorial court system organized by Sargent had Courts of the General Quarter Sessions of the Peace, Courts of Common Pleas, Courts of Probate, Orphan's Courts, Circuit Courts, and "a Supreme Court, which doubled as a chancery court."

Judges of Mississippi Territory (1798–1817)
Name	Dates of service
Peter Bryan Bruin	1798–1809
William McGuire	1798–1799
Daniel Tilton	1798–1802
Seth Lewis	1800–1803
David Ker	1802–1805
Thomas Rodney	1803–1811
Ephraim Kirby	1804
Harry Toulmin	1804–1817
George Matthews Jr.	1805–1807
Walter Leake	1807–1817
Francois Xavier Martin	1809–1810
Obadiah Jones	1810–1817?
Oliver Fitts	1810–1811
David Campbell	1811–1813
Josiah Simpson	1812–1817
George Poindexter	1813–1817
Stevenson Archer	1817–1819

== See also ==
- Chickasaw
- Choctaw
- Creek (people)
- Historic regions of the United States
- History of Alabama
- History of Mississippi
- Mobile District
- Territorial evolution of the United States
- United States Attorney for the District of Mississippi
- List of capitals in the United States § Historical state, colonial, and territorial capitals

== Sources ==
- McMullin, Thomas A. (1984). Biographical directory of American territorial governors. Westport, Connecticut: Meckler. ISBN 978-0-930466-11-4.
- Sobel, Robert (1978). Biographical directory of the governors of the United States, 1789-1978, Vol. II. Meckler. ISBN 9780930466008.
