= John Stampley =

Mississippi Territory politician

John Stampley was a politician of Mississippi Territory, United States. He was married into a family of South Carolina Baptists who arrived in British West Florida around 1781.

== Biography ==
Stampley was said to be an emigrant from Switzerland, arriving in America in 1763. He married Phoebe Curtis in South Carolina before migrating to the Mississippi country around 1780. He traveled with a group of in-laws and friends including Richard Curtis Sr. and Richard Curtis Jr., John Courtney, Daniel Ogden, and William Ogden, and Mr. Perkins. Curtis, at least, had fought with the Swamp Fox and had his property destroyed by the British in consequence, so saw fit to leave war-torn South Carolina. According to a biography of Richard Curtis Jr., "After entering the Tennessee river, the emigrants were attacked by the Cherokee Indians near the mouth of Clinch river. The third boat was captured. and all aboard were massacred except one woman. The voyage down the Ohio and the Mississippi was uneventful. In the early part of the year, 1781, the two boats reached their destination at the mouth of Cole's creek on the east bank of the Mississippi river, about twenty miles north of the site where the present city of Natchez is situated."

He was a Baptist preacher. He and his brother Jacob Stampley came to Mississippi together. According to J. F. H. Claiborne, "Jacob served as an officer in the Spanish cavalry in 1793 and was appointed by Governor Claiborne a Justice for Jefferson County (which office he retained for many years)."

He appears in the 1792 Spanish census of the Natchez District as Juan Stampley, living in the Villa Gayoso section. With Alexander Montgomery, also of Pickering County, he was nominated by John Adams and affirmed by the 6th Congress to serve on the Mississippi Territory legislative council. He served as president of the legislative council of Mississippi Territory from 1801 to 1802. He lived in a household of 12 people in Jefferson County in 1810. He was a head of household in Jefferson County in 1816.

== Family ==
His daughter Margaret Stampley was married to planter David Hunt.

== Sources ==
- Gillis, Norman; Gillis, Irene S. (n.d.). Early Inhabitants of the Natchez District. [Per LOC, possibly published 1963]. Shreveport, Louisiana. LCCN 64002728. OCLC 732676231. FHL 153410.
- Jones, John G. (1866). A Concise history of the introduction of Protestantism into Mississippi and the Southwest. St. Louis: P.M. Pinckard.
- Otken, Rev. Chas. H. (1900). "XI. Richard Curtis in the Country of the Natchez". Publications of the Mississippi Historical Society. III. Mississippi Historical Society: 147–155. ISSN 0885-792X.
- Wilkinson, Marcellus McCowen (1949). Genealogy of Wilkinson and kindred families. Shelby, Mississippi: Shelby Book Store.
