= James Patton (Mississippi politician) =

American politician

2nd Lieutenant Governor of Mississippi
- In office 1820–1822
- Governor: George Poindexter
- Preceded by: Duncan Stewart
- Succeeded by: David Dickson

Personal details
- Born: September 26, 1780 Abbeville County, South Carolina
- Died: May 3, 1830 (aged 49) Winchester, Mississippi, U.S.

James Patton (September 26, 1780 - May 3, 1830) was the Lieutenant Governor of Mississippi from 1820 to 1822. He lived in Winchester, Mississippi.

== Biography ==
Patton was born in Abbeville County, South Carolina, on September 26, 1780.

In 1801, Patton was appointed one of the commissioners for the marking of a land route from the Gulf of Mexico to Natchez, Mississippi.

Patton served as a probate judge in Wayne County, Mississippi.

in 1810, Patton served as a lieutenant colonel in the Territorial Cavalry, and in 1819 he was a major general in the Mississippi State Militia.

He represented Wayne County in the Mississippi Territory General Assembly in 1811 and 1813.

"Patton's Fort" was erected at Winchester in 1813 during the Creek War, and Patton was the commander.

Patton was one of a three-member commission that selected Jackson, Mississippi as the site for the state capitol. Patton, with Thomas Hinds and William Lattimore, had made their way up the Pearl River in 1820 in search of a suitable location.

Patton was described in 1880 as:

One of the leading men of his day, of great personal popularity. He resided in Winchester, then a beautiful village, which he made a center of political influence, second only to Natchez. Judge Powhatan Ellis and Judge John Black, who both became U.S. Senators, commenced life there under his auspices, as did several other prominent men. He was a man of courtly manners, a fine writer and impressive speaker; was elected Lieutenant-Governor and would have attained the highest honor of the State, but for his premature death.

He died in Winchester, Mississippi, on May 3, 1830, and was buried in the Patton Family Cemetery in Winchester.

== See also ==
- List of lieutenant governors of Mississippi

Political offices
Preceded by Duncan Stewart	Lieutenant Governor of Mississippi; 1820-1822	Succeeded by David Dickson
