= Washington, Mississippi =

Former territorial capital

- Unincorporated community
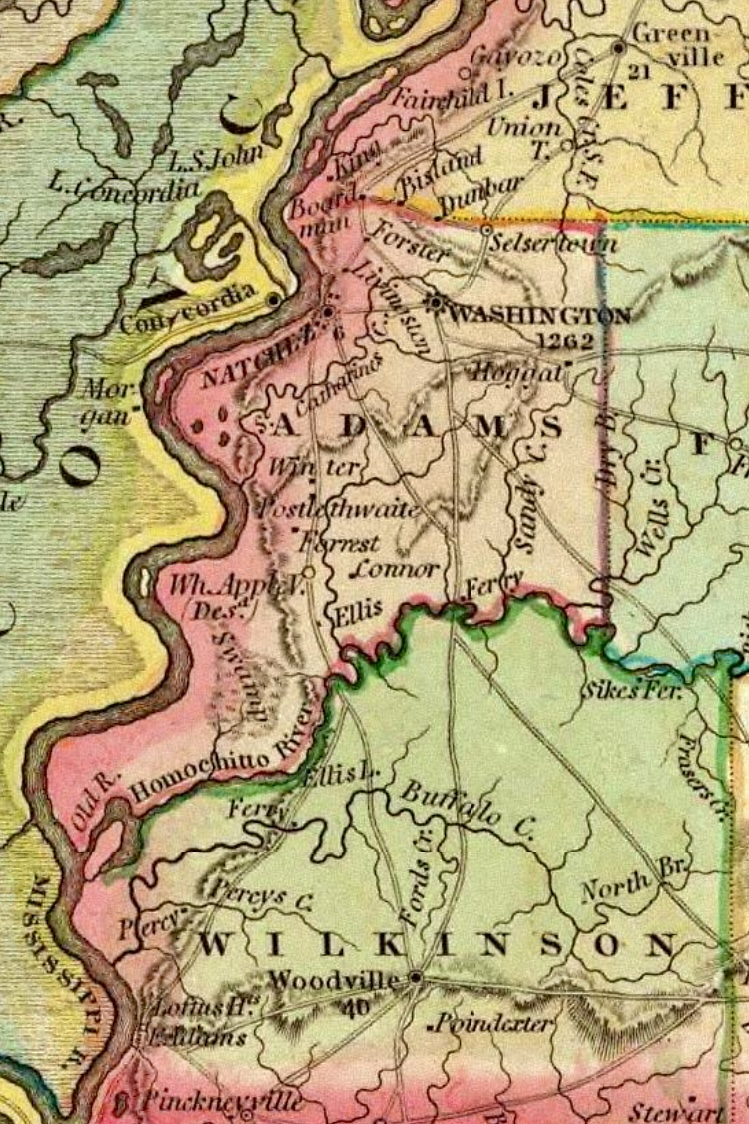
- Washington mapped in 1823
- Nickname: "Versailles"
- Location within Mississippi Location within the United States
- Coordinates: 31°34′44″N 91°17′57″W
- Country: United States
- State: Mississippi
- County: Adams
- Elevation: 279 ft (85 m)
- Time zone: UTC-6 (Central (CST))
  - Summer (DST): UTC-5 (CDT)
- ZIP code: 39190
- GNIS feature ID: 679358
- Highways: U.S. Highway 61; U.S. Highway 84; U.S. Highway 98

Washington is an unincorporated community in Adams County, Mississippi, United States. Located along the lower Mississippi, 6 miles (9.7 km) east of Natchez, it was the second and longest-serving capital of the Mississippi Territory.

== History ==
The townsite was established near a water source known as Ellicot's Spring. Washington became the second territorial capital, when the seat of the Mississippi Territory General Assembly was moved from Natchez to Washington on February 1, 1802. Fort Dearborn, located at Washington, was for a time the largest military installation then extant in the United States, with more than 2,000 soldiers stationed there, including such notables as Brigadier General Leonard Covington and future General Winfield Scott. It was established in 1802 to protect the newly relocated capital of the Mississippi Territory. British traveler Fortescue Cumming visited in 1808 at which time he "counted thirty scattering houses, including one store, one apothecary's shop, three taverns, and a gaol." Two enslaved men were convicted of the murder of Thomas H. Green, son of territorial treasurer Abner Green, and executed April 23, 1810, at Washington, Mississippi Territory.

The community, and nearby Woodville, both made public gestures in support of the Monroe administration during the lead-up to what became the War of 1812. As of 1813, celebrations might be held at DeFrance's Hotel. According to a history of Methodism in Mississippi, the church at Washington "became the most popular preaching place in all the country. The congregations were large and appreciative, many of whom, from time to time, were sweetly drawn into the gospel net...The social meetings of the Church were highly appreciated and well attended...Washington was now in the zenith of its glory and prosperity." Surnames of white families that lived in or near Washington were Bowie, Calvit, Chew, Covington, Dangerfield, Freeland, Grayson, Magruder, Wilkinson, Winston, and Wailes. According to a 1906 survey of "lost villages of Mississippi":

It was a gay and fashionable place, compactly built for a mile or more from east to west, while every hill in the neighborhood was occupied by some gentleman's chauteau. The presence of the military had its influence on society; punctilio and ceremony, parades and public entertainments were the features of the place. It was, of course, the haunt of politicians and office seekers; the center of political intrigue, the point to which all persons in pursuit of land or occupation first came. It was famous for its wine parties and its dinners, usually enlivened by one or more duels immediately afterward.

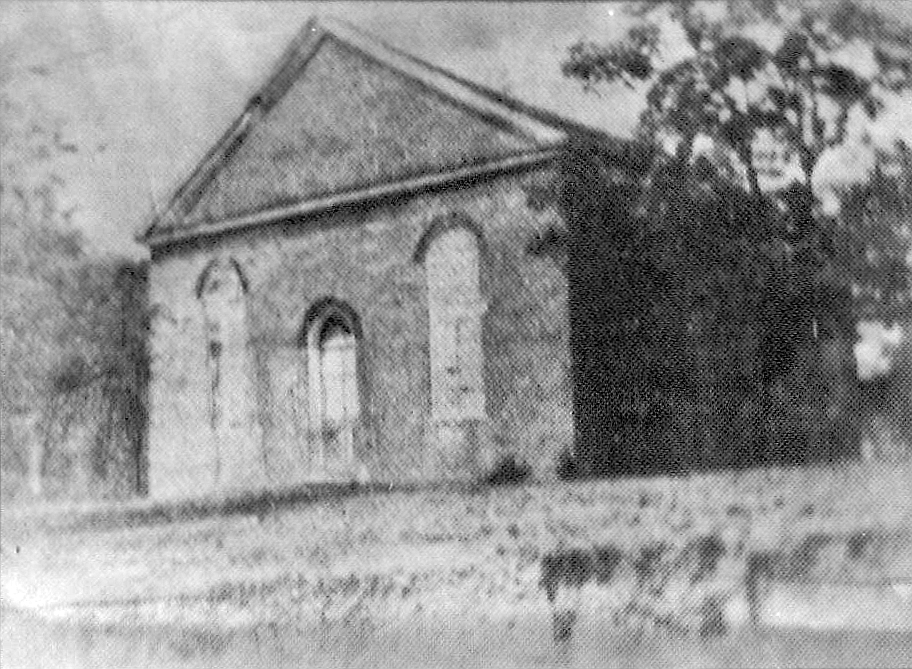
Methodist Meeting House—the first statehood constitutional convention was held here July to August 1817

The town had one Main Street (the Natchez Trace) that ran for about a mile. The Mississippi constitution convention of 1817 met in Washington at the Methodist Meeting House (which was purchased by Jefferson College in 1830). Mississippi's first constitution was written and adopted here, and the state's first legislature convened here in 1817. The preliminary trial of U.S. vice-president Aaron Burr occurred under some nearby oak trees. After Mississippi was admitted to the union in 1817, the legislature met once in Washington, and afterward in Natchez. In the late 1810s there was a yellow fever outbreak in the town, which had previously been considered a "salubrious climate" compared to Natchez, and the disease killed "a number of the best citizens, so that people were restrained from fixing their family residences there." The capital was officially moved to Jackson in 1822, in keeping with the Act passed by the Assembly on November 28, 1821, which chose to have a more central location for better accessibility to more residents. The Natchez Trace fell out of use as a U.S. post road by 1824, consequent to the development of the steamboat, and "from this date (1825–26) a variety of natural causes contributed to its depopulation until for a score of years it has been nothing more than a scattered village." An outbreak of yellow fever in 1825 killed 52 of the approximately 250 residents of the town.

By the 1840s the "old village" already represented a "forgotten society."

The "Rodney Burying Ground" at Washington is enclosed by a brick wall and has several graves without markers. Thomas Rodney, Felix Huston, and Nehemiah Tilton are believed to be buried here.

The old Methodist Meeting House building was demolished by a tornado in January 1873.

In 1879, the Jesse James gang robbed two stores in Washington and in Fayette in Jefferson County, Mississippi. The gang absconded with $2,000 cash in the second robbery and took shelter in abandoned cabins on the Kemp Plantation south of St. Joseph, Louisiana. A posse attacked and killed two of the outlaws but failed to capture the entire gang. Jesse James would live another three years until his demise in St. Joseph in northwestern Missouri.

== Geography ==
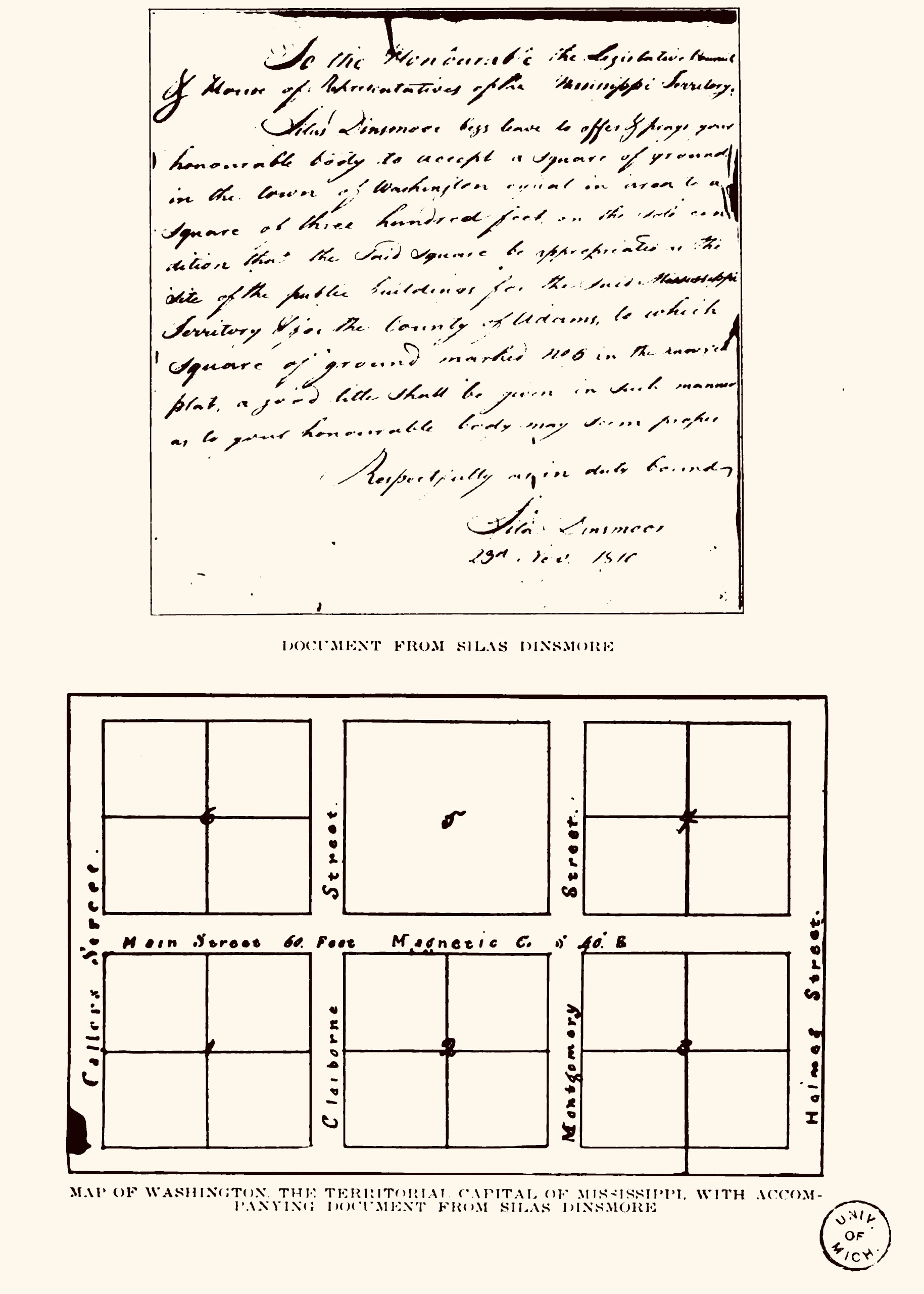
Silas Dinsmoor's map of Washington, Mississippi Territory

=== Architecture ===
Elizabeth Female Academy, considered to be the first women's college in the state, was established at Washington in 1818. For most of its history, it was a degree-conferring college; it closed in 1845. Clear Creek Baptist Church, erected in 1825 and one of the oldest churches in Mississippi, is located in Washington.

In 1836, it was the site of a meeting of the Mississippi Baptist Convention, which was reorganized under President Ashley Vaughn of Natchez. The convention, or association, contained 122 churches, 56 clergy, and 4287 members.

The congregations would have reflected the majority-black population of the area, where most workers on the cotton plantations were slaves. The town also has Washington Methodist Church. These were the two prominent denominations at the time of settlement. Both recruited slaves and accepted blacks as preachers in many locations. Before the American Civil War, both the national Baptist Association and Methodist Church split over the issue of slavery, and southern congregations established separate organizations.

=== Parks ===
Washington is the location of Jefferson College, now known as Historic Jefferson College. It is operated as a state historic park and museum by the Mississippi Department of Archives and History. The college was created by an act of the first General Assembly of the Mississippi Territory in 1802 and was named in honor of Thomas Jefferson, then-president of the United States. Although chartered in 1802, it did not open as a school until 1811.

Operated as a boys' academy, it continued in this capacity (but for a few brief, temporary closures, due to war, fire, remodeling and the like) for the next 153 years. It closed its doors for good in 1964. Jefferson College operated mostly as an all-male, college-preparatory academy. For a period it operated as Jefferson Military College, a military-style boarding school for high-school boys. Jefferson Davis attended Jefferson College as a 10-year-old boy in 1818, when it had the status of a boys' academy. John James Audubon was a teacher there from 1822 to 1823.

== Culture ==
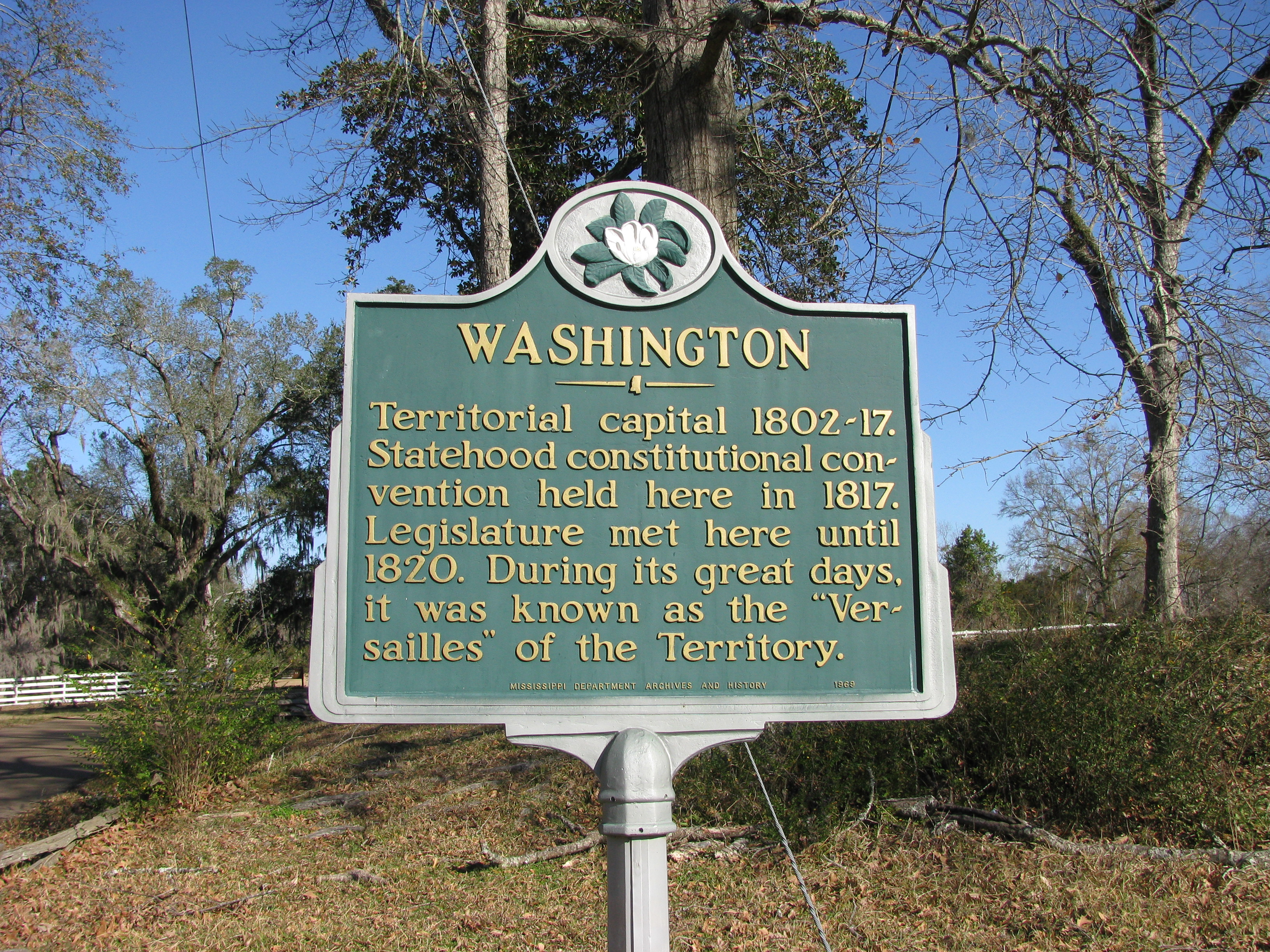
Historical plaque at Washington

Scenes of the lost silent Civil War film The Heart of Maryland (1921) were filmed in Washington. Some of John Ford's film The Horse Soldiers (1959), set during the Civil War and starring John Wayne, was filmed here. Portions of Disney's movie The Adventures of Huck Finn (1993) were filmed here and in Natchez.

== Notable people ==
- Thomas Affleck (1812–1868), Scottish-American horticulturist
- Bill Allain (1928–2013), 59th governor of Mississippi, 1984–1988

== See also ==
- Villa Gayoso
- Old Greenville, Mississippi
- Rodney, Mississippi
- Fort Dearborn (Mississippi)

== Sources ==
- Rothman, Adam (2005). Slave Country: American Expansion and the Origins of the Deep South. Harvard University Press. doi:10.4159/9780674042919. ISBN 978-0-674-04291-9. LCCN 2004057658. OCLC 56191767.
