= William McGuire (judge) =

Mississippi Territorial judge (1765–1820)

- Citizenship: American
- Education: College of William & Mary
- Occupation: Judge

William McGuire (1765–1820) was an American judge, one of the first three judges in the Mississippi Territory. He arrived in Mississippi in the fall of 1799, appointed as chief justice, to assist governor Winthrop Sargent as one of three judges who were to write up the set of laws for the new territory. However, McGuire went back to his home in Virginia after only a couple of weeks or months. After his return from Mississippi he practiced law, and was appointed superintendent at the Harpers Ferry Armory. He died in 1820, from effects of a wound he received at age 16, when he was wounded in the Battle of Eutaw Springs, 1781.

== Biography ==
William Edward McGuire was born into a supposedly ancient family originally from North Central Ireland dating back to the 13th century. Edward McGuire (the "founder" of the US family branch), born 1720, arrived in Frederick County, Virginia, sometime before 1747, the year he was given a land grant. His son William was born in 1765, likewise in Frederick County. He was a cadet in the Continental Army in 1778. He was promoted to ensign in 1780, and later became lieutenant of the First Virginia Artillery. He was wounded in the Battle of Eutaw Springs, 1781; this wound was to trouble him his entire life, and he died of it in 1820. After independence he studied law at the College of William & Mary. He was active in politics as a legislator in Richmond from 1796 to 1799, until he was appointed first chief justice for the Mississippi Territory.

== Career in Mississippi ==
The Mississippi Organic Act of 1798 authorized president John Adams to appoint a governor and three judges for the Mississippi Territory. Governor Winthrop Sargent was to be assisted in setting up the laws for Mississippi with the assistance of judges Peter Bryan Bruin (untrained in law and likely an alcoholic), Daniel Tilton, and William McGuire, who were described as "representing varying degrees of incompetence". McGuire was nominated on 26 June 1798 as chief justice for the territory, and was confirmed in June 1798. He was a man from Virginia and the only one of the three who was an actual lawyer, arrived in the territory after February 28, 1799, when the first law was passed without him; governor Sargent was anxiously awaiting him early in 1799, because of McGuire's actual expertise with the law (in contrast to himself and the other two judges). However, he stayed only a few weeks or months and left in September 1799, signed but a few of the laws, and then went back to Virginia, claiming he couldn't live on the salary in Mississippi.

== After Mississippi ==
McGuire seems to have resigned his position in 1801. On his return to Winchester, Virginia, he practiced law until 1816, when he became superintendent for the Harpers Ferry Armory, an appointed position. He died there, in 1820, as a result of the wound he had received in 1781.

== See also ==
- List of Mississippi Territory judges
