= John Steele (Mississippi politician) =

Mississippi politician (1755–1817)

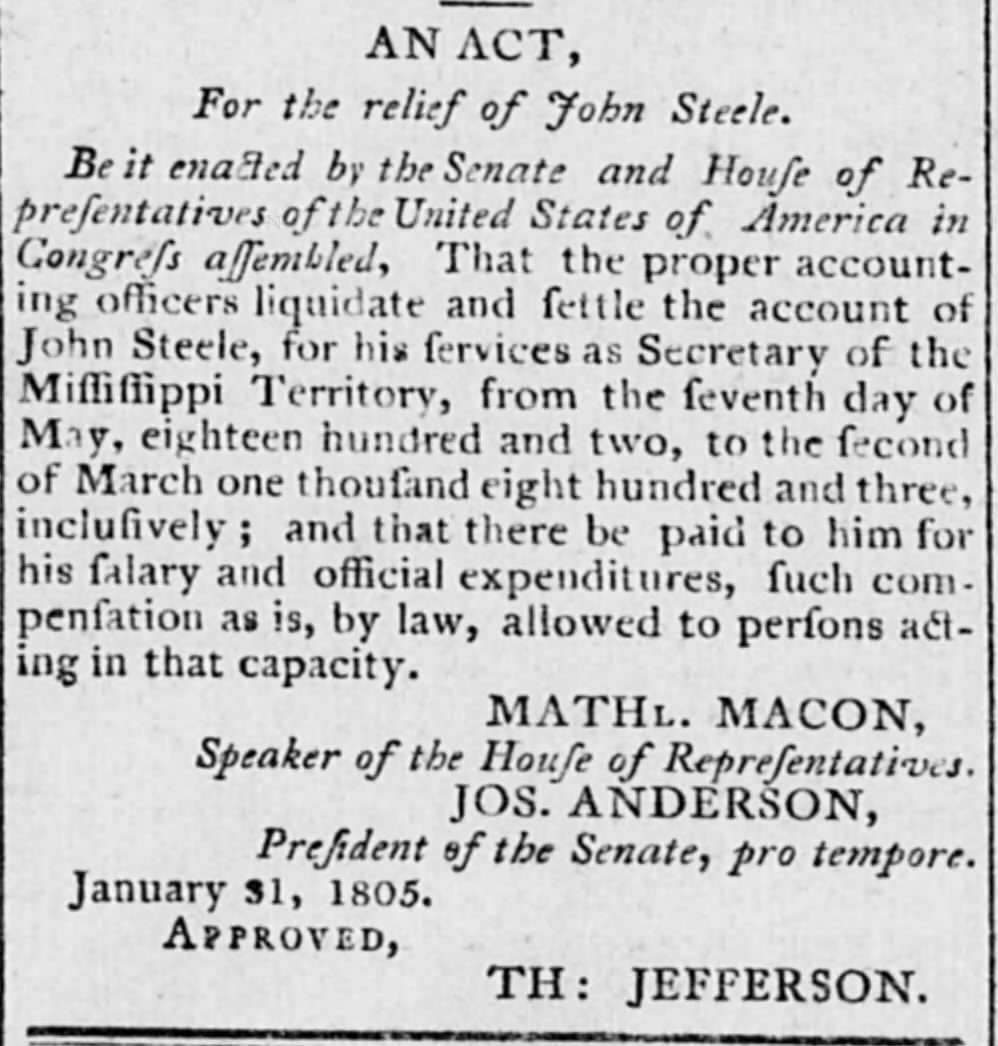
- Born: c. 1755; Virginia or the Carolinas?
- Died: 1817; Mississippi

John Steele (c. 1755–1817) was a politician of Mississippi Territory. He served as territorial secretary, acting governor, and speaker of the Territorial house.

== Before Mississippi ==
According to Dunbar Rowland, Steele was originally from Virginia, and wounded by a musket ball at the Battle of Germantown during the American Revolutionary War. More recent scholarship describes him as "a nondescript politician from the Carolinas." According to an 1859 genealogy of the Steele family, he was from Augusta County, Virginia, and "in early life made one of the Executive Council of Virginia, which he held many years. During John Adams' administration he was appointed one of the Commissioners to treat with the Cherokee Indians...He probably never married; he d. about 1805."

== Mississippi Territory ==
He came to Mississippi Territory about 1798. He was appointed territorial secretary and served as acting governor from April 1801 to November 1801. He was a member of the House of Representatives of the Mississippi Territory General Assembly in 1804 and 1805. He was speaker of the territorial House from 1806 to 1807. He was a member of the state constitutional convention in 1817 but died later that year. Arguing that national political parties did not map accurately to territorial political allegiances defined by local social and trade networks, Hugh Roberts classes him as a Quasi-Federalist.

His plantation was called Belvidere. In 1799 he wrote a letter to his brother in Virginia reporting "that an enslaved man would sell for between $1,000 and $1,200 in Natchez, an amount, he predicted, the enslaved man's labor would likely pay for within the course of a single year." He fell "victim to the region's omnipresent fevers," and was disabled and sickly through much of his official service.

== Sources ==
- Durrie, Daniel S. (1859). Steele family, a genealogical history of John and George Steele (settlers of Hartford, Conn.) 1635–6, and their descendants... Albany: Munsell & Rowland.
- Haynes, Robert Vaughn (2010). The Mississippi territory and the southwest frontier, 1795–1817. Lexington: University Press of Kentucky. ISBN 978-0-8131-2577-0.
- Roberts, Hugh James (2021). Territorial Politics: Formative Identities and Networks in the Mississippi Territory, 1798–1817 (Ph.D. History). University of Kent. doi:10.22024/UNIKENT/01.02.85542.
- Rowland, Dunbar (1907b). "Steele, John & Steele's Administration". Encyclopedia of Mississippi history; comprising sketches of counties, towns, events, institutions and persons. Vol. II. Madison, Wisconsin: S. A. Brant. pp. 731–733.
- Stearns, Susan Gaunt (2024). Empire of Commerce: The Closing of the Mississippi and the Opening of Atlantic Trade. University of Virginia Press. doi:10.2307/jj.13840496. ISBN 978-0-8139-5125-6. JSTOR jj.13840496.
