= Henry Hunter (Mississippi politician) =

Mississippi Territory legislator (d. c. 1822)

Henry Hunter (d. c. 1822) was a politician of Mississippi Territory, United States.

== Life and career ==
Hunter may have been a native of Virginia. Hunter appears on the 1792 Spanish-government census of the Natchez District as a resident of the Villa Gayoso section, under the name Enrique Hunter. He was granted "2000 acres by the Spanish in 1793." He was a relative of Narsworthy Hunter who was the first Mississippi Territory delegate to the United States Congress.

Hunter represented Adams County in the first territorial General Assembly, along with James Hoggett, Anthony Hutchins and Sutton Banks. In 1802 he was appointed sheriff of Wilkinson County. He was elected Speaker of the House of Representatives of Mississippi Territory from 1800 to 1803.

Henry Hunter Sr. and Henry Hunter Jr. both appear on the 1805 tax list for Wilkinson County, Mississippi Territory. He was enumerated as an inhabitant of Wilkinson County in 1816.

He died in or before 1822. William Yerby was the administrator of his estate. His estate included two tracts of land and 30 slaves.

== Sources ==
- Gillis, Norman; Gillis, Irene S. (n.d.). Early Inhabitants of the Natchez District. [Per LOC, possibly published 1963]. Shreveport, Louisiana. LCCN 64002728. OCLC 732676231. FHL 153410.
- McBee, May Wilson (1953). The Natchez Court Records, 1767–1805: Abstracts of Early Records. Ann Arbor, Michigan: Edwards Brothers – via Internet Archive, Allen County Public Library Genealogy Center.
- Rowland, Dunbar, ed. (1905). The Mississippi territorial archives, 1798–1818.
