= Washington Methodist Church =

Historic church in Mississippi, United States

- U.S. National Register of Historic Places
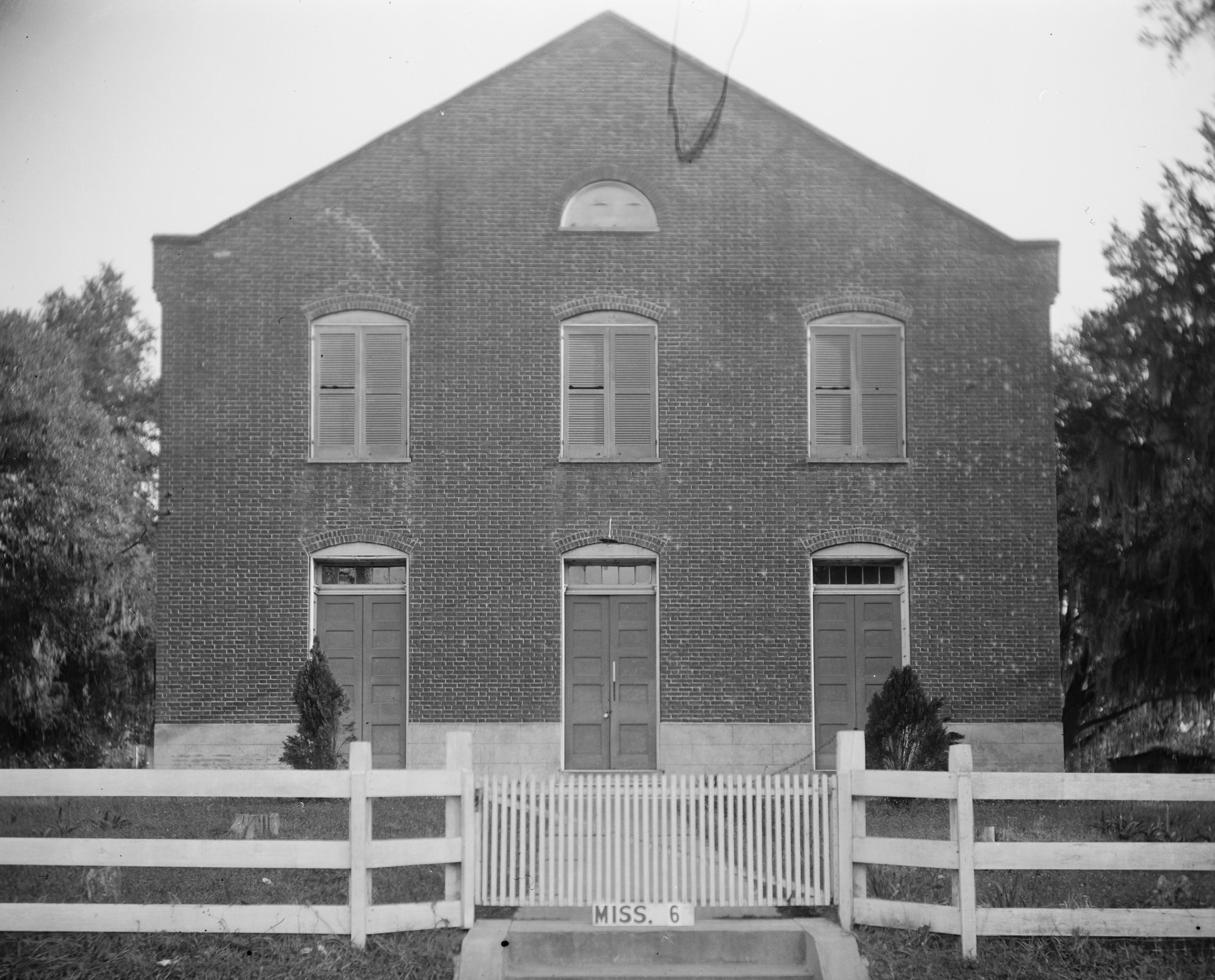

- Location within Mississippi Location within the United States
- Location: Highway 61 North., Washington, Mississippi
- Coordinates: 31°34′41″N 91°18′8″W
- Area: 0.8 acres (0.32 ha)
- Built: 1828
- Architectural style: Federal
- NRHP reference No.: 86002168
- Added to NRHP: September 04, 1986

Washington Methodist Church is a historic church at Highway 61 North and the north end of Morgantown Road in Washington, Mississippi.

It was organized in 1799 by Rev Tobias Gibson. The present church building was built in 1828 and added to the National Register in 1986.
