= Hezekiah J. Balch =

Mississippi state senator (d. c. 1818)

Hezekiah J. Balch (sometimes middle initial I. or I. J.) was a 19th-century American politician of Mississippi. According to the Works Progress Administration's History of Jefferson County, Mississippi, he was "lawyer from North Carolina, [who] came to Tennessee, then removed to Jefferson County, settling near Greenville, where he figured prominently." In J. F. H. Claiborne's telling, "H. I. Balch was a lawyer from North Carolina, to Tennessee, thence to this Territory. Some of his family figured in the State of Franklin, and afterwards in Nashville."

There was a letter waiting for him at the Greenville, Mississippi Territory post office in October 1805. He was executor for a Mississippi estate in 1806. He married Betsy West in Jefferson County, Mississippi on January 4, 1806. His wife Elizabeth Balch died at Greenville in January 1807. He remarried, to Maria West, in January 1808.

In May 1813 he placed second behind Thomas Hinds in an election for a seat in the Mississippi Territorial Assembly. In December 1813 he was seated as the representative from Jefferson County in the territorial legislature. According to the WPA history, Balch was the representative to the territorial assembly from Jefferson County from 1811 to 1813.

Balch's second wife, Maria West Balch, died in 1816 at age 24.

He was a signer of the 1817 Constitution of Mississippi. He served as a Mississippi state senator representing Jefferson County to the 1st Mississippi Legislature of 1817–1818. Under the state constitution his term of service was to be one year. He died sometime prior to May 1818.

== See also ==
- Cato West
- Hezekiah Balch
- Mecklenburg Declaration

== Sources ==
- Powell, Susie V., ed. (1938). Jefferson County (PDF). Source Material for Mississippi History, Volume XXXII, Part I. WPA Statewide Historical Research Project – via Mississippi Library Commission (mlc.lib.ms.us).
