= Baldwin County, Mississippi Territory =

Defunct subdivision, Alabama

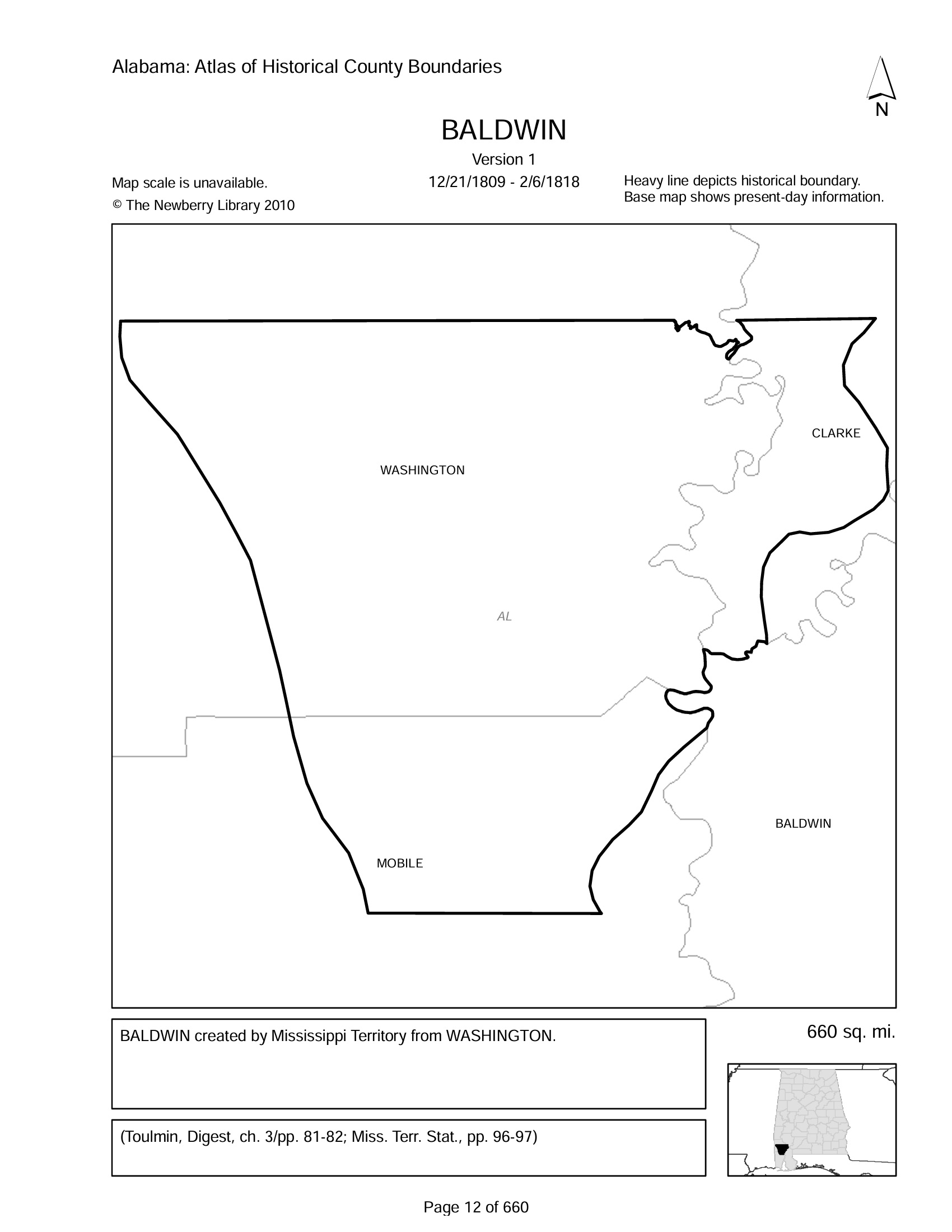
Baldwin County, Mississippi Territory, from the Atlas of Historical County Boundaries

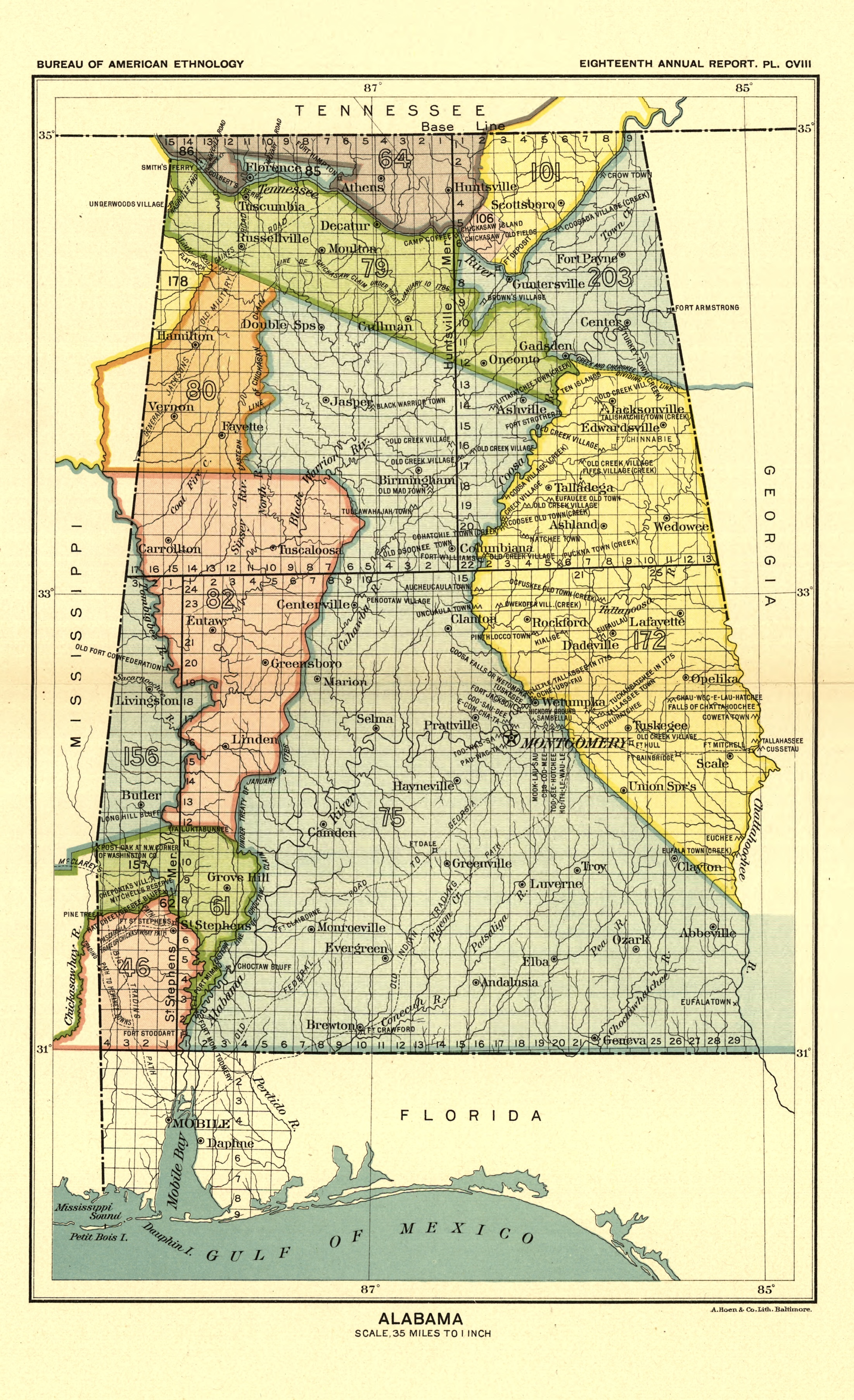
Alabama – Indian Land Cessions, 1898

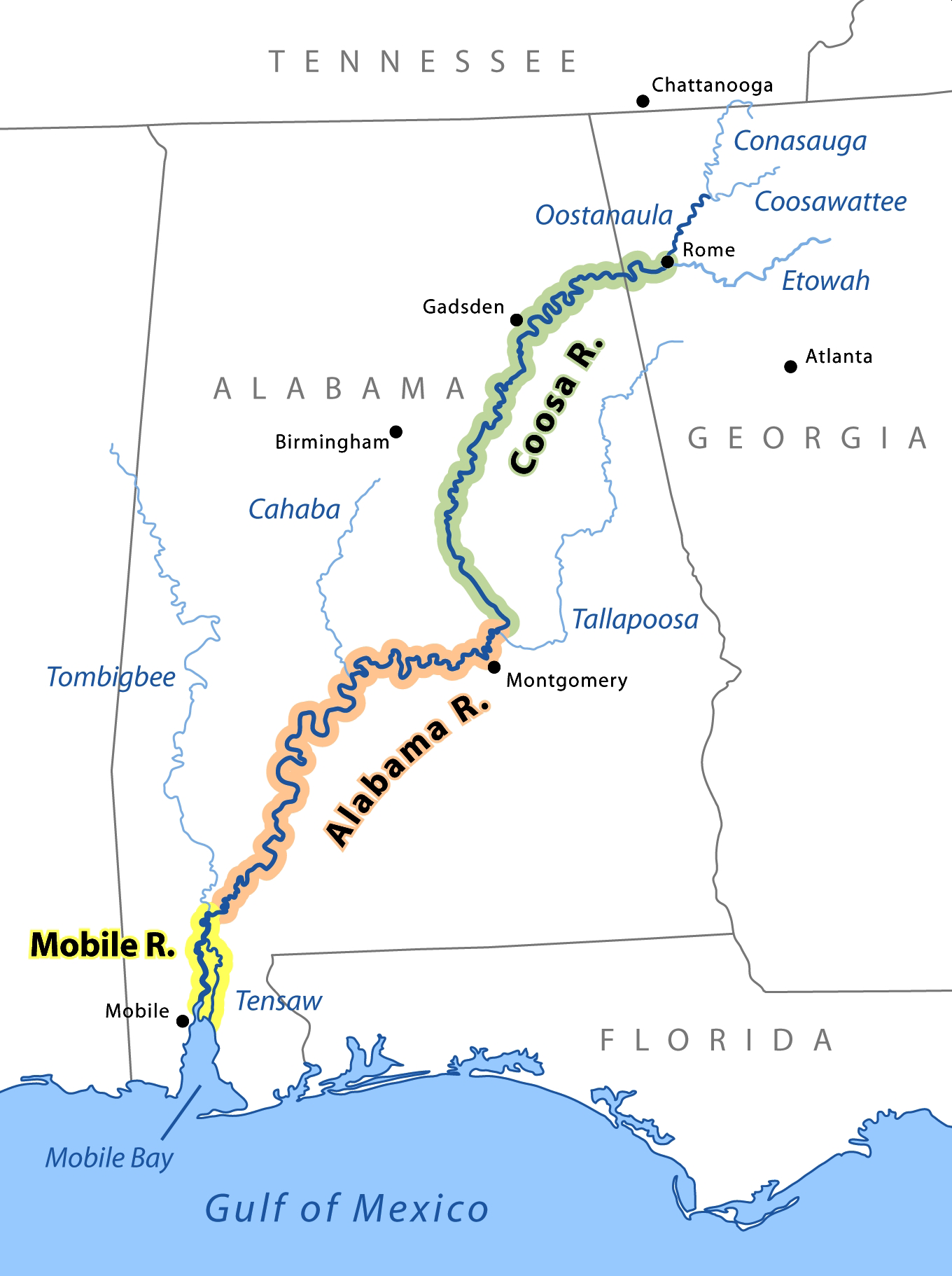
Mobile, Tombigbee, Alabama, Coosa River system

Baldwin County, Mississippi Territory was a jurisdiction in the part of Mississippi Territory that was later separated into Alabama Territory and eventually became the U.S. state of Alabama. Baldwin County was organized on December 21, 1809. It was named for Founding Father Abraham Baldwin of Georgia. There are two population censuses of the county, one taken 1810 and one taken 1816. The boundaries of the Mississippi Territory county have no overlap with the boundaries of the current Baldwin County, Alabama, which was first organized in an approximation of its current form in 1820. The Baldwin County of Mississippi Territory was located on land that is now part of Washington, Mobile, and Clarke counties, Alabama.
