= Duncan Stewart (Mississippi politician) =

American politician

1st Lieutenant Governor of Mississippi
- In office October 7, 1817 – January 5, 1820
- Governor: David Holmes
- Preceded by: Office established
- Succeeded by: James Patton

President pro tempore of the Mississippi State Senate
- In office 1817
- Preceded by: Office established

Member of the Mississippi Senate from the Wilkinson district
- In office 1817
- Preceded by: Office established

Personal details
- Born: January 16, 1761
- Died: November 26, 1820 (aged 59) Mississippi, U.S.

Duncan Stewart (January 16, 1761 – November 26, 1820) was a veteran of the American Revolutionary War, slave owner, frontiersman, and politician. He holds the very rare distinction of having served three separate states state legislatures over his life, in North Carolina, Tennessee, and Mississippi.

== Early life ==
Duncan Stewart was born January 16, 1761. He was the son of William Stewart, a Scottish immigrant. His mother was Janet Stewart, née McDougal. He was a 14th generation descendant of Robert the Bruce.

During the American Revolution, Stewart entered the Continental Army as a private, eventually being promoted to the rank of colonel of North Carolina troops.

Stewart was married to Penelope Jones. Their children were, William, who died in infancy; Tignal J. (1800–1855), a member of the Mississippi Legislature who married Sarah, a daughter of Judge Peter Randolph; James A. (1811–1883), who married Juliana, another daughter of Judge Randolph; Charles Duncan (1812/3-1886), a planter who married a daughter of U. S. Senator John Black; Catherine (1804–1829), who married Judge Harry Cage; and Eliza (died 1870), who married Colonel W. S. Hamilton and was the mother of State Senator Jones S. Hamilton.

== Political career ==
In the early 1790s he represented Bladen County, North Carolina in the North Carolina General Assembly. From 1790 to 1792 he represented Bladen County in the House of Commons (then the name of the state House of Representatives), and in the State Senate from 1793 to 1794.

After he moved to Tennessee, he served as Tennessee state senator for the fourth, fifth, and sixth General Assemblies. He represented Montgomery and Robertson Counties fourth and fifth General Assemblies, and he represented Montgomery, Robertson, Dickson, and Stewart Counties in the sixth General Assembly. Stewart County was carved out from the western part of Montgomery County, and is named after him. It was formed on November 3, 1803.

In 1811, he moved to Woodville, Mississippi where he began cotton farming. After Mississippi achieved statehood, he was elected both as a Mississippi state senator and as the inaugural Lieutenant Governor of Mississippi. He was elected President Pro Tempore of the Mississippi Senate. Alongside Governor David Holmes, Stewart served as Lieutenant Governor from October 7, 1817, to January 5, 1820.

In 1812, he had Holly Grove built.

== Death ==
Duncan Stewart died on November 26, 1820, at his plantation home, and was buried next to his twin brother James. The two are buried at the Stewart Two cemetery with four other people out in the woods in southern Mississippi.

Political offices
Preceded by office created	Lieutenant Governor of Mississippi; October 7, 1817 - January 5, 1820	Succeeded by James Patton
