= The Book Farm =

The Book Farm was a book collection and reprint publishing house under the direction of idiosyncratic bibliophile Charles Heartman (1883–1954). It moved with the Heartmans from Hattiesburg, Mississippi to Biloxi to New Braunfels, Texas, to New Orleans. Heartman is best known for his bibliographies What Constitutes a Confederate Imprint?: Preliminary Suggestions for Bibliographers and Catalogers (1939) and North American Negro Poets: a Bibliographical Checklist of Their Writings from 1760–1944 (1945). Heartman collected widely but had a particular interest in African-Americana.

== List of Heartman's Historical Series titles ==
- No. 69 – A Bibliography of Mississippi Imprints, 1798–1830
- No. 71 - The Narrative of James Roberts, Soldier in the Revolutionary War and at the Battle of New Orleans.
