= Daniel Burnet =

Mississippi politician (1763–1827)

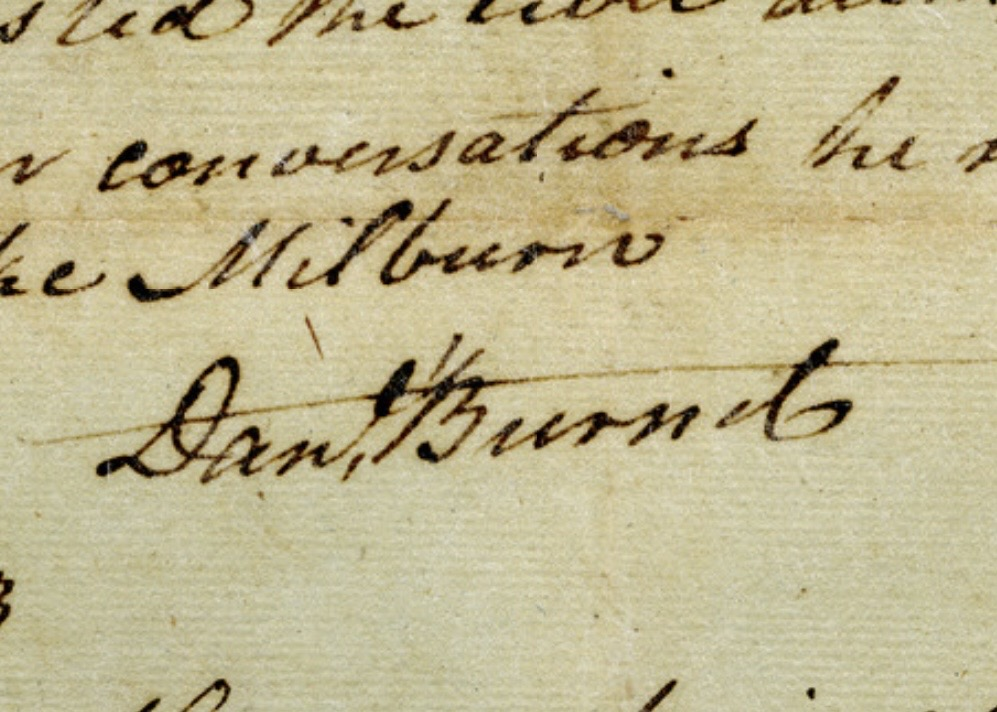
- Daniel Burnet signature, 1813
- Born: July 11, 1763 or 1768? Carolinas
- Died: May 7, 1827; Claiborne County, Mississippi, United States

Daniel Burnet (July 11, 1760s – May 7, 1827) was an American plantation owner, surveyor, and Mississippi legislator.

== Biography ==
He was the oldest of nine children born to John and Catherine Devonport Burnet, English settlers of the Carolinas. His gravestone is generally transcribed as birthyear 1763, but a family bible record says 1768. His dad rode with "the Swamp Fox" of the Carolinas, Francis Marion, during the American Revolutionary War.

He emigrated to Spanish Natchez in 1790 and settled near the Grindstone Ford. He was granted approximately 2,000 arpents by the Spanish government, and he built a mill on Bayou Pierre that lent its works to the placename Grindstone Ford. A sawmill was in place by 1792 and he wanted to add a gristmill. He assisted Stephen Minor and William Dunbar "in surveying the boundary between West Florida and the Mississippi Territory".

He was appointed U.S. postmaster at Grindstone Ford on the Natchez Trace in 1805. He was a commander of the Claiborne County militia. He served on a "frontier committee" to negotiate with the Choctaw in 1813. He served as president of the Mississippi Territory legislative council from 1805 to 1809, and was speaker of the house from 1813 to 1815. He represented his county in the Mississippi constitutional convention of 1817. He served as an Indian treaty commissioner in 1818 with the Choctaws.

He died May 7, 1827 in Claiborne County, Mississippi. One obituary said he was 50 years old when he died. He is buried at Grindstone Ford Cemetery.

== Richard Saunders to Liberia ==
The executor of his estate was Samuel Cobun, widower of Burnet's late sister, Margaret. Cobun reported in a letter of 1835 that Richard Saunders, who was a "very estimable and much respected mechanic, a Cotton Gin and Mill Wright," had hired himself out and bought his freedom from the estate at a rate of $250 a year for four years, as well as buying a woman and her six-year-old son for $1,125. The family had recently departed from New Orleans for Liberia.

== Personal life ==
Daniel Burnet's "intelligent and fascinating" sister Mary Burnet married Frances Nailor and then Dr. Thomas Anderson of Vicksburg. His brother John Burnet (1782–1843) served in the Mississippi Territory legislature. His brother Amos Burnet (1789–1824) was a delegate to the 1817 constitutional convention from Hancock County in the Pearl River district.

His first wife was named Patterson. His second wife was Agnes Wilson Humphreys, grandmother of Benjamin Grubb Humphreys. Anges Wilson Humphreys Burnet was said to be some relation of Founding Father James Wilson.

== See also ==
- American Colonization Society
- Mississippi-in-Africa

== Sources ==
- Rainwater, P. L. (September 1934). "The Autobiography of Benjamin Grubb Humphreys August 26, 1808–December 20, 1882". The Mississippi Valley Historical Review. 21 (2): 231–255. doi:10.2307/1896893. JSTOR 1896893.
- Sydnor, Charles S. (July 1937). "Historical Activities in Mississippi in the Nineteenth Century". The Journal of Southern History. 3 (2): 139–160. doi:10.2307/2191879.
