= Pickering County, Mississippi Territory =

Original subdivision, 1798–1802

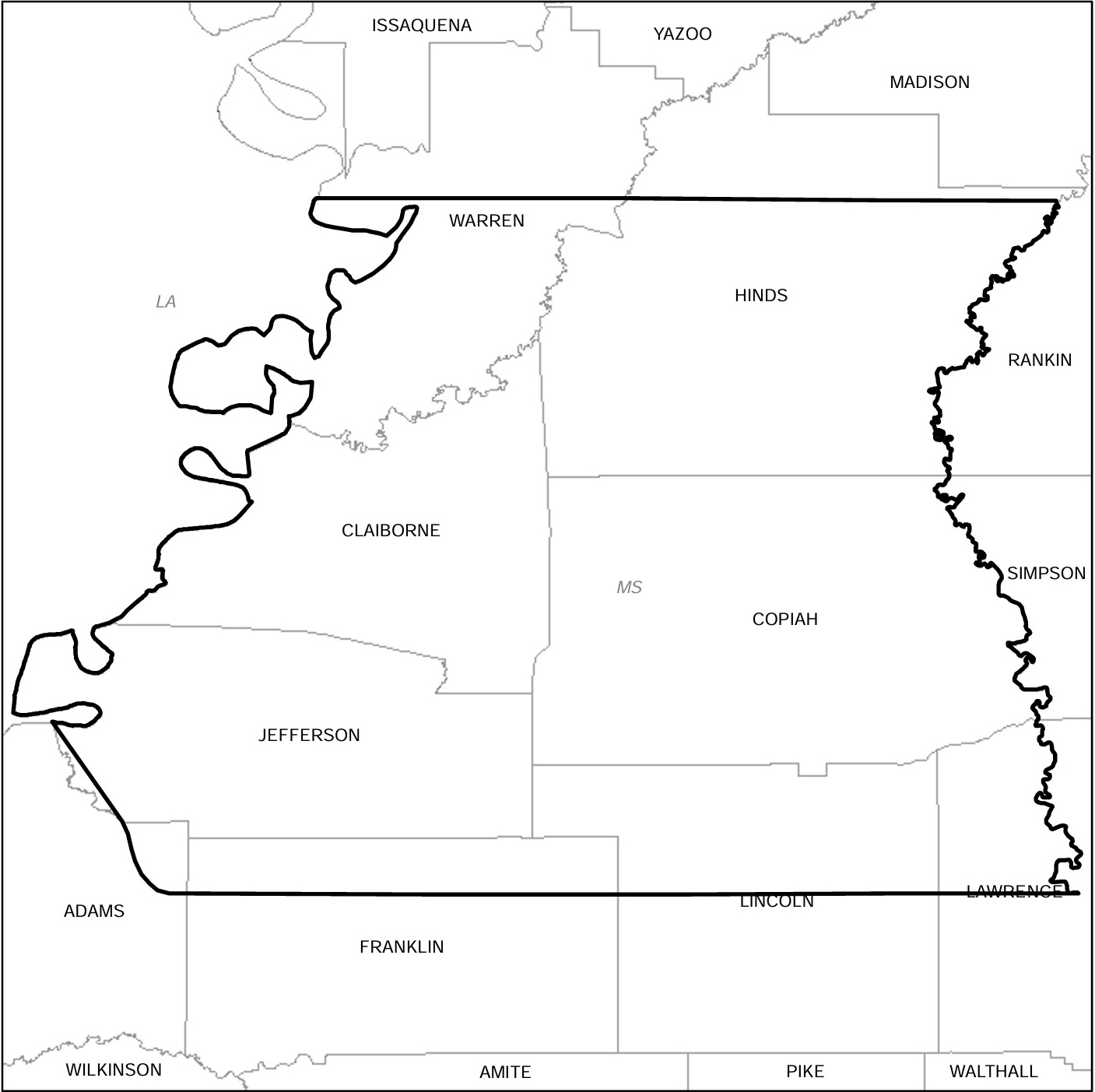
Boundaries of Pickering County, 1800-06-04 to 1802-01-10 (Atlas of Historical County Boundaries, Newberry Library)

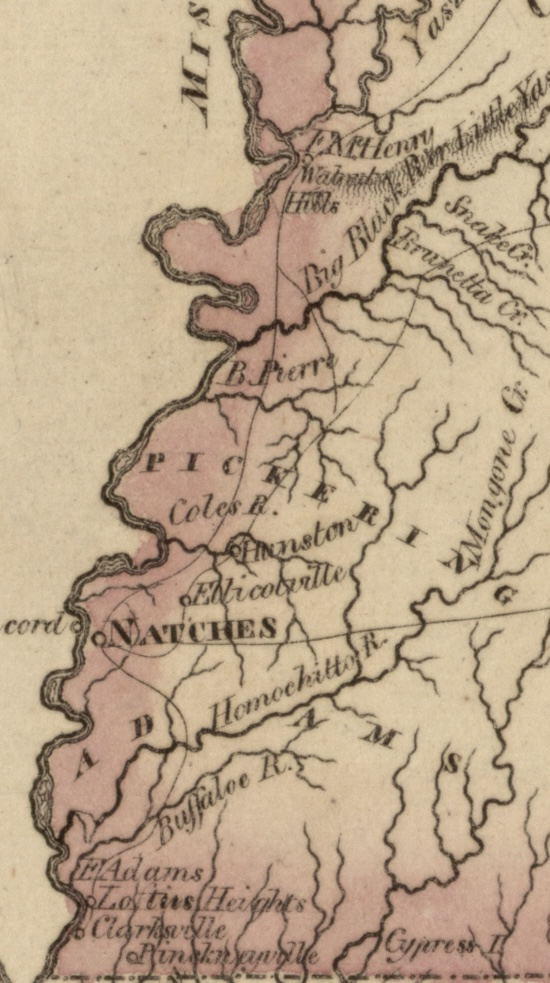
Natchez District c. 1800

Pickering County was one of the original counties of Mississippi Territory in the United States. Together with Adams County, Mississippi Territory, Pickering County was a first-level subdivision of the land that had been known as the Natchez District under the British and Spanish. The dividing line between Pickering and Adams was at Fairchilds Creek. Established in 1798, and originally named for Cabinet member Timothy Pickering, the county was subdivided into Claiborne County and Jefferson County in 1802. The original Pickering County also included some of the land that was later to become Warren County, Mississippi. Pickering County was the seat of power of Natchez Junto, the Green family–Cato West faction in territorial politics.

Timothy Pickering was a member of the Federalist political party, who had been "bitter in their denunciations of the [Louisiana Purchase], for the expanding West could be expected to draw off their population, rival their trade, and some day dominate the Union."

== See also ==
- List of former United States counties
