= Philander Smith =

American philanthropist (1809–1882)

- Born: November 23, 1809; Worth, New York, US
- Died: February 24, 1882; Oak Park, Illinois, US
- Resting place: Forest Home Cemetery (Forest Park, Illinois)
- Occupation: Real estate
- Known for: Philander Smith University
- Spouse: Adeline M. Smith (1812–1885)
- Children: 2

Philander Smith (November 23, 1809 – February 24, 1882) was an American real estate agent and philanthropist. Philander Smith University is his namesake.

== Biography ==
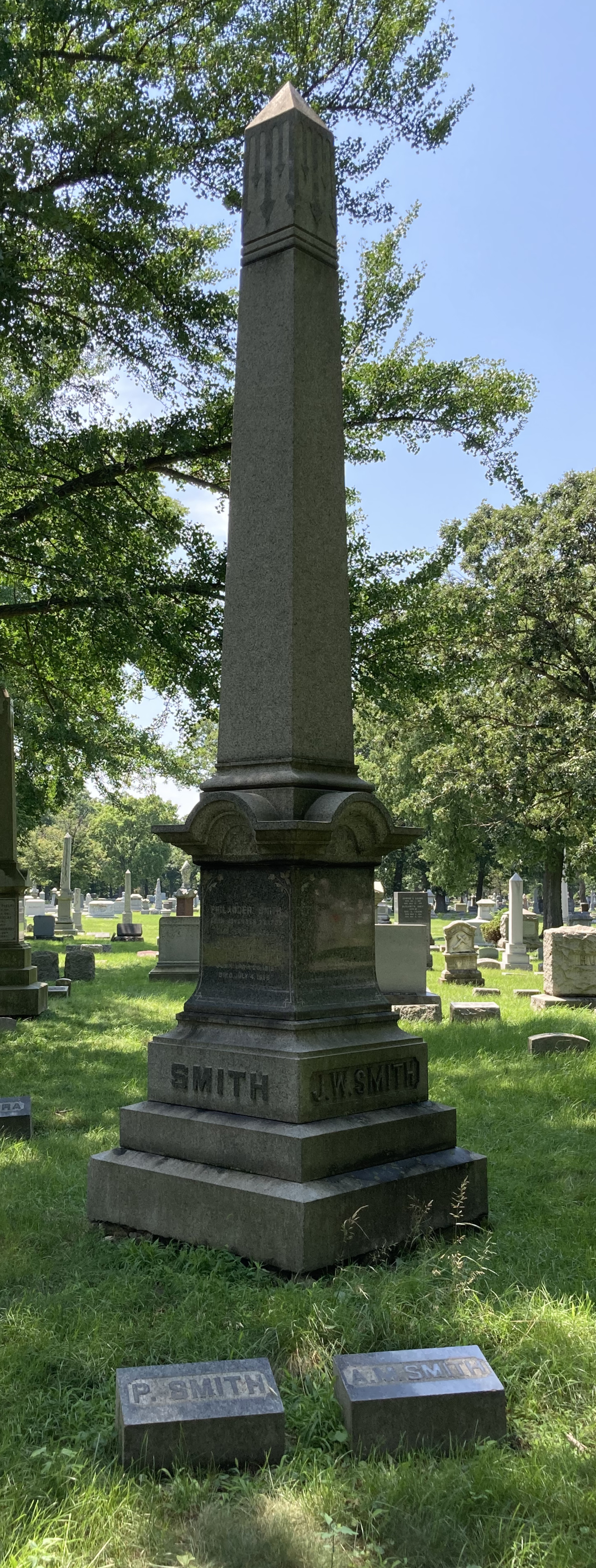
Smith's grave at Forest Home Cemetery

Philander Smith was the son of David Smith, whose 1801 sawmill in upstate New York gave name to the village of Smith’s Mills (now the town of Adams).

Among the early settlers at Oak Park, Illinois, Smith and wife Adeline provided financial assistance to Methodist missions in India, China, and Japan.

Smith died in Oak Park on February 24, 1882, and was buried at Forest Home Cemetery in Forest Park, Illinois. His widow Adeline continued to give away his $125,000 fortune to a number of causes for a dozen years after his death. Her gift that year to the Methodists' Walden Seminary in Little Rock, Arkansas resulted in its immediate renaming as Philander Smith College.

== Legacy ==
- In 2003, the Historical Association of South Jefferson [County] moved into the former Philander Smith House at 29 East Church Street in Adams, New York.
- With the 1866 marriage of his daughter Sarah, Mr. Smith became father-in-law to famous Christian Zionist William Eugene Blackstone.
- Adeline M. Smith was memorialized in The Gospel in All Lands 1895, p. 519, so she probably died that year. The eulogy lists the many donations she made to the church.
