= Alexander Montgomery (Mississippi politician) =

Mississippi Territory politician (d. 1812)

- Born: Province of South Carolina
- Died: November 1812; Mississippi Territory, United States

Alexander Montgomery (d. November 1812) was a landowner and legislator of Mississippi Territory, United States.

Montgomery came from the Waxhaws settlement of Scotch-Irish in South Carolina. He reportedly fought for the Continentals in the American Revolutionary War. His journey to the lower Mississippi River valley seems to have been made after the revolutionary period. He came down by way of Tennessee. He received a Spanish land grant along Buffalo Creek in the Natchez District in July 1789. In 1793 he was granted 500 arpents on Thompson's Creek. Another resident later attested "that the claimant was twenty-one years of age at the date of the warrant, and was a resident in the Mississippi territory on the 27th October 1795. The claimant made a small improvement, and built a cabin on the premises, in the year 1797."

In 1801 Alexander Montgomery was chosen by U.S. president John Adams from the nominations of the representatives to sit on the legislative council of Mississippi Territory, and then he was elected to the territorial house of representatives in 1806. In 1808 he was again appointed to the legislative council, and was chosen president of the council in 1809.

His died in November 1812.

Four of his brothers, William Montgomery, Samuel Montgomery, Robert Montgomery, and Joseph Montgomery, followed Alexander to Mississippi, "and founded families of importance". The lawyer and judge Alexander Montgomery was his son.

== Sources ==
- Bryan, Catherine Cameron Wilkerson (1959). "IX. Alexander Montgomery". Montgomery: descendants of Hugh Montgomery of South Carolina. West Point, Mississippi: n.pub. pp. 31–35 – via Allen County Public Library Genealogy Center, Internet Archive.
- Rowland, Dunbar, ed. (1907b). Encyclopedia of Mississippi History; Comprising Sketches of Counties, Towns, Events, Institutions and Persons. Vol. 2. Southern Historical Publishing Association. Madison, Wis.: Selwyn A. Brant.
