= Atlas of Historical County Boundaries =

The Atlas of Historical County Boundaries (abbreviated AHCB) is a historical atlas and historical geographic information system chronicling the history of counties and county equivalents in the United States. It was compiled by the Dr. William M. Scholl Center for American History and Culture at the Newberry Library and edited by John Hamilton Long.

== History ==
The Atlas is an outgrowth of the Newberry Library's Atlas of Early American History, which was published in 1976. The same year, the library started the U.S. Historical County Boundary Data File Project to compile a spatial database of county boundaries from 1788 to 1980. Historians at the library and cartographers at the University of Wisconsin–Madison worked on the project with funding from the National Endowment for the Humanities and private sponsors. By 1982, the project had completed data on fourteen states during the 19th and 20th centuries. The database was published as County Boundaries of Selected United States Territories/States, 1790–1980 and deposited with the Inter-university Consortium for Political and Social Research. For researchers without access to capable computer equipment, the same information was published in five volumes by G. K. Hall & Co. as Historical Atlas and Chronology of County Boundaries, 1788–1980 (1984).

In 1987, a second Atlas project began to extend coverage to the entire United States. Coverage was also expanded to include the American colonial period up to the 1990s. A revised series of atlases was published by Simon & Schuster in 1993, one volume per state. The project was completed in June 2010, with additional national data files and animations added in 2012.

== Contents ==
The Atlas covers the history of more than 3,000 counties and county equivalents in the United States from the early 1600s to 2000. It is available in print form or as downloadable files in shapefile, Keyhole Markup Language, and PDF formats, which are compatible with geographic information systems including Google Earth and ArcGIS. These files were originally made available under the Creative Commons Attribution-NonCommercial-ShareAlike license but were later rereleased without any restrictions on reuse. According to the library, "some of these files contain the original, out-of-date copyright license; these can be ignored" as all of the project's data and files may be "consulted, reviewed, and reused for any lawful purpose, commercial or non-commercial, without licensing or permission fees to the library."

== Influence ==
The Atlas is used for genealogy and for researching land titles and other legal matters. It has been incorporated into OpenHistoricalMap, an open source map of history.

== See also ==
- List of GIS data sources
- Territorial evolution of the United States
