= Coles Creek (Mississippi) =

Creek in Louisiana and Mississippi, US

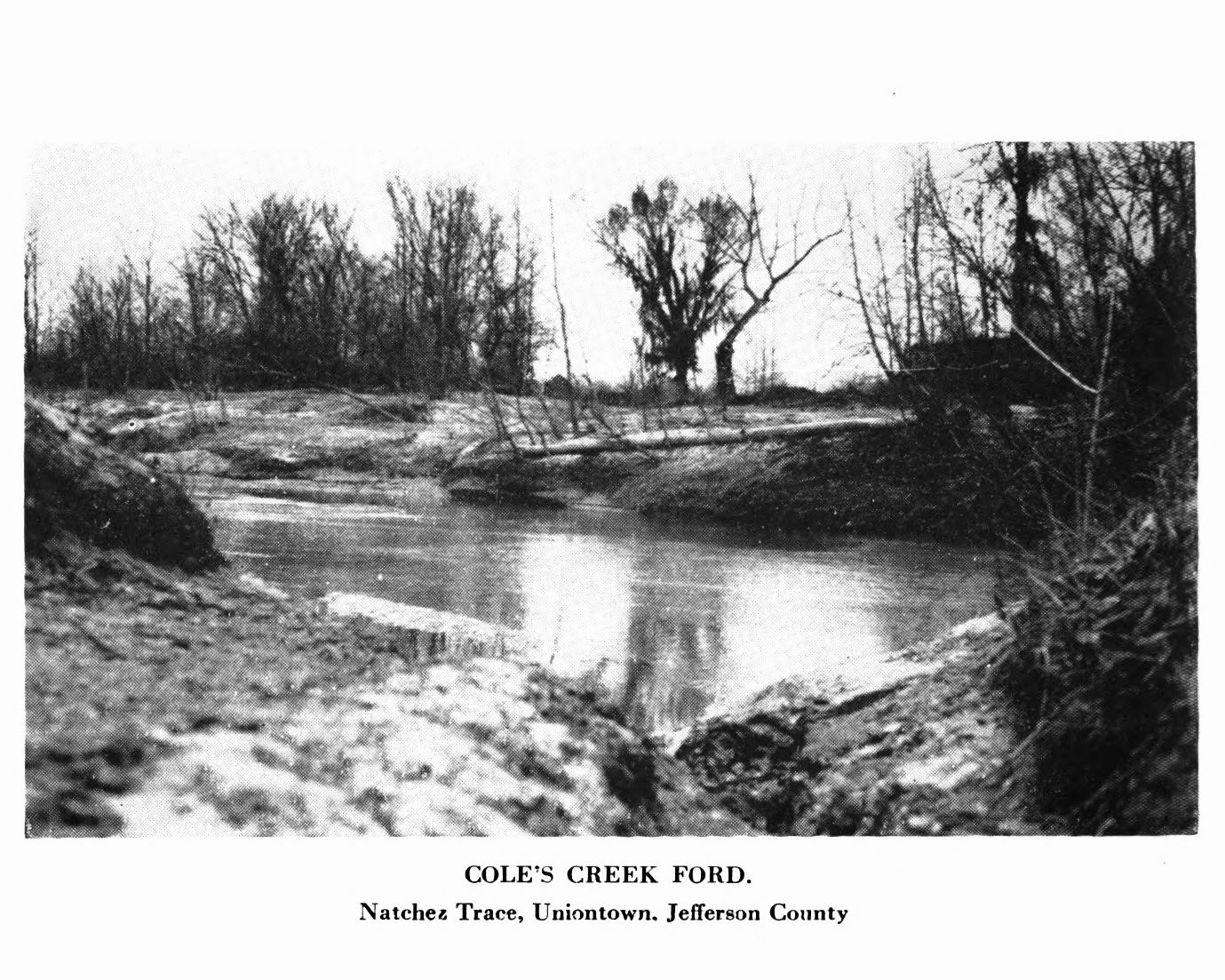
- Coles Creek ford, Natchez Trace, Jefferson County, Mississippi c. 1938

Location
- Country: United States
- States: Mississippi; Louisiana
- County: Jefferson
- Parish: Tensas

Physical characteristics
- Mouth
  - coordinates: 31°44′46″N 91°21′55″W

Basin features
- River system: Mississippi River

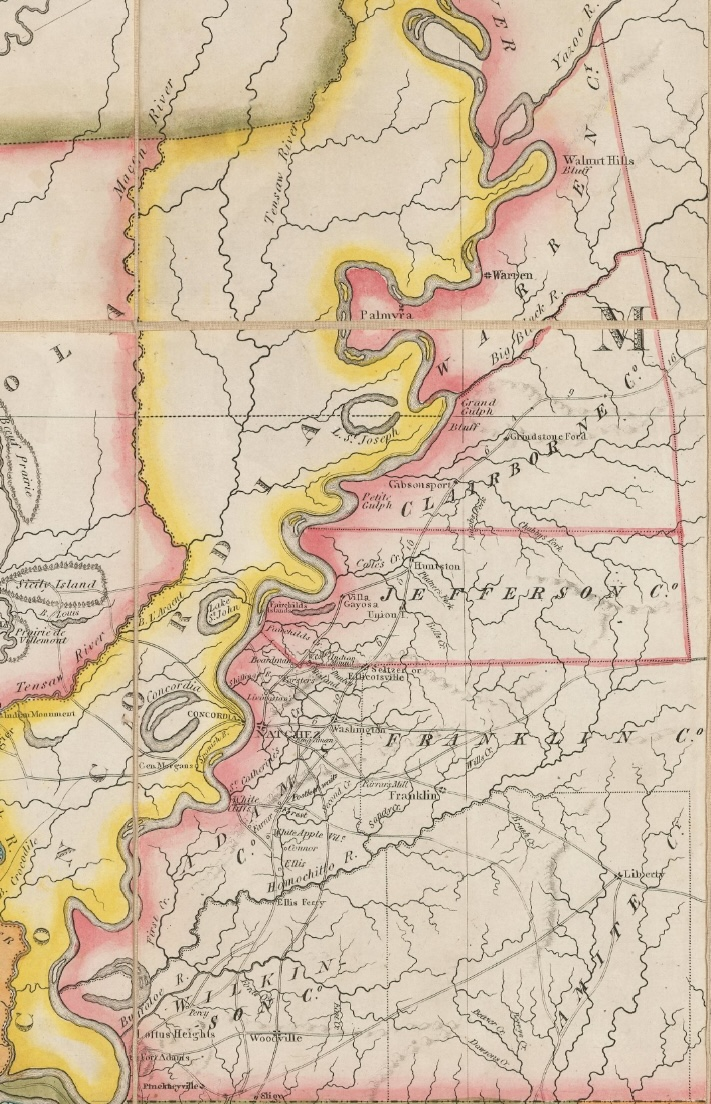
Villa Gayoso (earlier and later Cole's Creek) in 1816

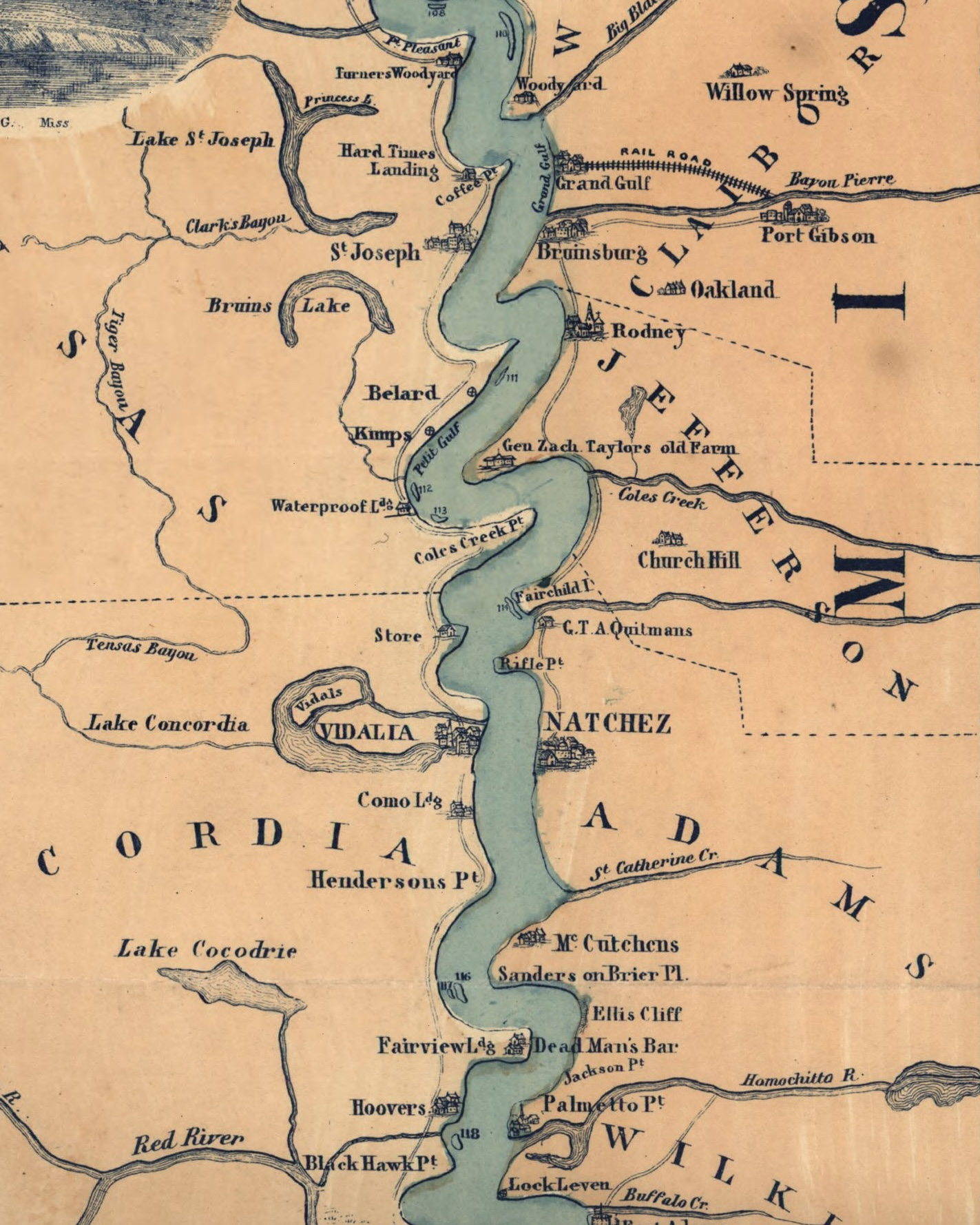
Landmarks in the vicinity of Vicksburg, Vidalia, and Natchez c. 1863

Coles Creek is a creek in the states of Louisiana and Mississippi that is a tributary of the Mississippi River. The Natchez Trace had a rest stop along Coles Creek.

In the 1770s it was known as Boyd's Creek. Cole's Creek or Coles Creek, dubbed Villa Gayoso in 1792, was the site of an early colonial settlement and the seat of a Catholic parish where the Spanish colonial governor sent a priest to evangelize mostly Protestant settlers to the Catholic faith. A Baptist church was organized at the settlement in 1791. In June 1792 it was the second-largest settlement in the Natchez District with a population of 909 (this enumeration may not included enslaved people).

According to J. F. H. Claiborne, "Villa Gayoso was on Cole's creek, in Jefferson county, (not far from the river) where Gov. Gayoso erected a sort of chateau as a summer residence, and posted a small garrison. The land was claimed by Everard Green (son of Col. Thomas Green) and was in controversy between the parties when the Spaniards left the district. It was turned over by the Spanish authorities to Capt. Guion as public property, and he stationed there to hold it for the United States Corporal Diddup and five men. The Green family are now and long have been in possession of the premises." Andrew Jackson's brother-in-law John Donelson lived at Villa Gayoso in the 1790s.

== See also ==
- List of rivers of Mississippi
