= Choctaw Creek =

Choctaw Creek may refer to:

- Choctaw Creek (Claiborne County, Mississippi), a tributary to Bayou Pierre in Mississippi
- Choctaw Creek (Copiah County, Mississippi), a tributary to Bayou Pierre in Mississippi
- Choctaw Creek (Harrison County, Mississippi)
