= Petite Gulf =

Petite Gulf is an alternate spelling of Petit Gulf, which might refer to:

- Petit Gulf, an eddy and bend in the Mississippi River
- Petit Gulf cotton, a valuable cultivar originally from Mexico but popularized by Mississippi planters

== See also ==
- Grand Gulf
