= Rodney, Mississippi =

Extinct settlement, Jefferson County

- Ghost town
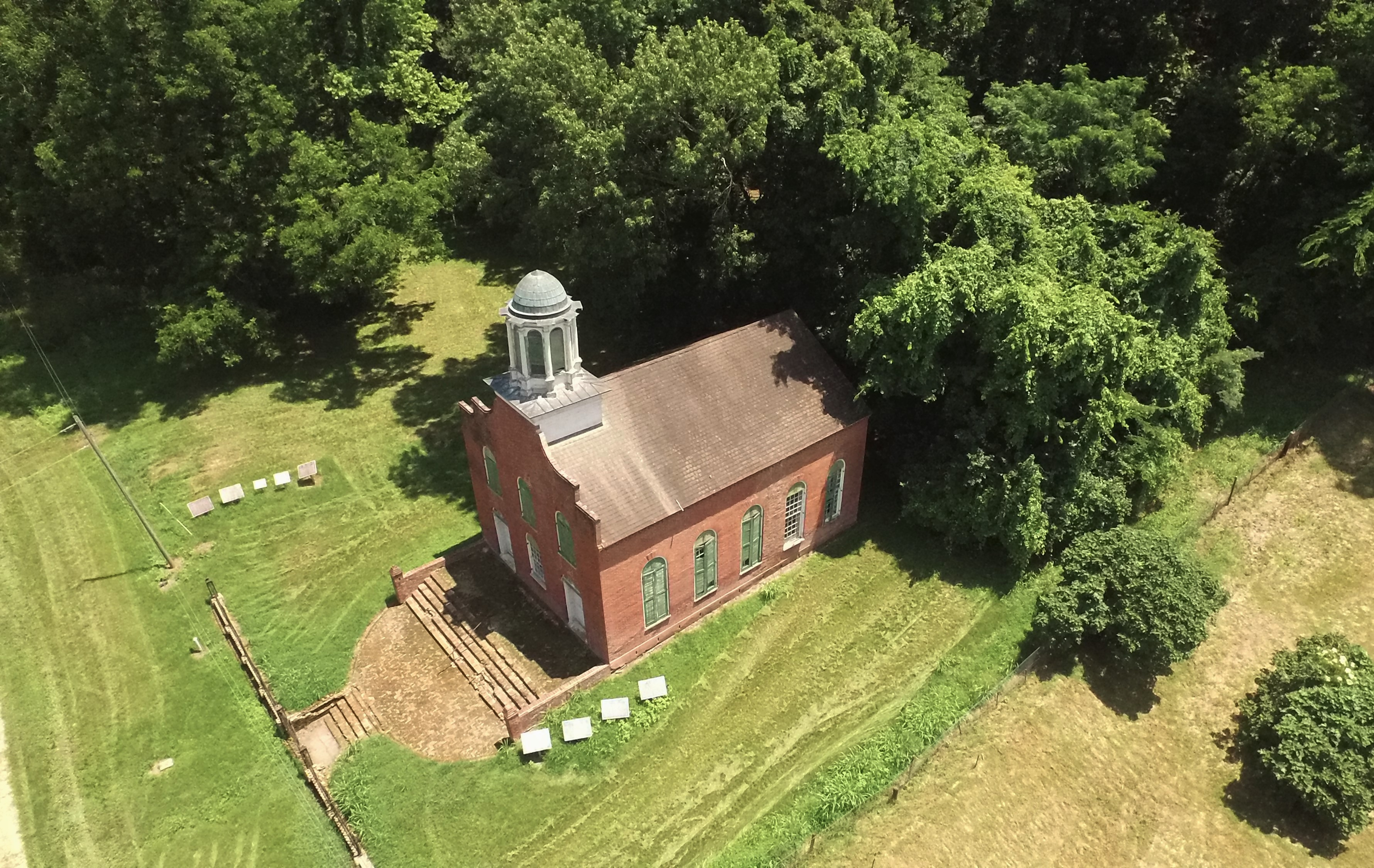
- Former First Presbyterian Church
- Nicknames: "Petite Gulf", "Little Gulf"
- Location within the United States Location within Mississippi
- Coordinates: 31°51′40.6″N 91°11′59.4″W
- Country: United States
- State: Mississippi
- County: Jefferson
- Founded: 1828
- Elevation: 82 ft (25 m)
- Time zone: UTC-6 (Central (CST))
  - Summer (DST): UTC-5 (CDT)
- GNIS feature ID: 676809

Rodney is a ghost town in Jefferson County, Mississippi, United States. Most of the buildings are gone and the remaining structures are in various states of disrepair. The town regularly floods and buildings have extensive flood damage. The Rodney History and Preservation Society is restoring Rodney Presbyterian Church, whose damaged façade from the American Civil War includes a replica cannonball embedded above its balcony windows. The Rodney Center Historic District is on the National Register of Historic Places.

The town is approximately 32 miles (51 km) northeast of Natchez and is currently about two miles (3.2 km) inland from the Mississippi River. Wetlands between the town and the river include a lake that roughly follows the river's former course. Atop the loess bluffs behind Rodney are its cemetery and Confederate earthworks from the Civil War.

In the early 19th century, Rodney was a cultural center of the region. In 1817, it was three votes away from becoming the capital of Mississippi. Rush Nutt, a resident of Rodney, developed a hybrid strain of cotton called Petit Gulf cotton and innovations to the cotton gin. In 1828, Rodney was incorporated and became the primary port for the surrounding area, with a population in the thousands. By 1860, the town was home to businesses, newspapers, and Oakland College. During the Civil War, Confederate States Army cavalry captured the crew of a Union Army ship who were attending a service in Rodney Presbyterian Church, resulting in the shelling of the town. After the war, the Mississippi River changed course, the railroad bypassed the area, and nearly all of buildings burned down. The population declined, and the town was disincorporated in 1930. By 2010, only "a hand full of people" were living in Rodney.

== History ==
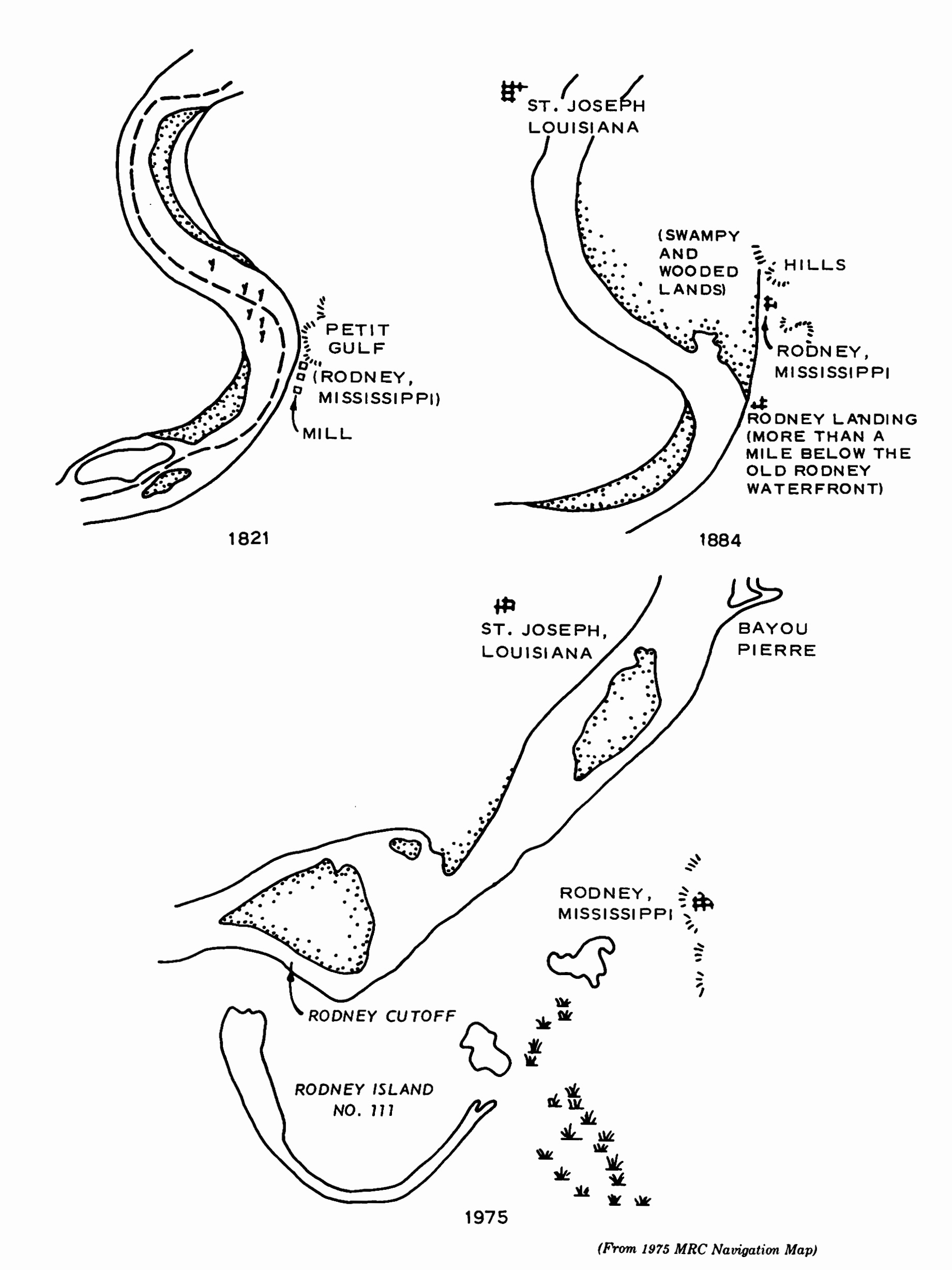
Petit Gulf in 1822; Rodney in 1884 and 1975

Rodney's landing site was a key waypoint on Native American routes around the Mississippi Delta region. Native American artifacts have been unearthed between the town site and Natchez Trace overland route. The Natchez people likely used the area as a portage between the Mississippi River and White Apple Village.

French forces claimed the area around Rodney in January 1763 as Petit Gulf in contrast to Grand Gulf, upriver. The name Petit Gulf referred to an inlet or narrow bend in the river, downstream from Bayou Pierre. After the French and Indian War, the region was ceded to Great Britain. The earliest-known land grant was to a Mr. Campbell in 1772. Spain took control of the region in 1781, and gave many land grants in West Florida to Anglo immigrants. American settlers, including the Nutt and Calvit families, moved into the area that would become Rodney. Spain lost control of the area in 1798, and on April 2, 1799, the Mississippi Territory was organized as a part of the United States. Three years later, Delaware magistrate Thomas Rodney was sent to Jefferson County as a territorial judge.

In 1807, Secretary of the Mississippi Territory Cowles Mead assembled a militia to capture Aaron Burr at Coles Creek, just south of Rodney. Burr was held at Thomas Calvit's home while under investigation for treason. Thomas Rodney presided over the Aaron Burr conspiracy trial and became Chief Justice of the Mississippi Territory. The town was renamed after Rodney in 1814. In the early 19th century, it was one of the most significant river ports for the Mississippi Territory.

In 1817, the Mississippi Territory was split into the modern state of Mississippi and the Alabama Territory. The 14 Mississippi counties that existed prior to statehood, sent 48 delegates to Jefferson College to draft a constitution for Mississippi's admission to the Union. Jefferson County sent Mead, H. J. Balch, Joseph Emory Davis, and Cato West. By the time of the convention, Natchez was already surpassing Rodney in development. Rodney lost by 3 votes, and Natchez became the first capital of Mississippi.

=== Growth ===
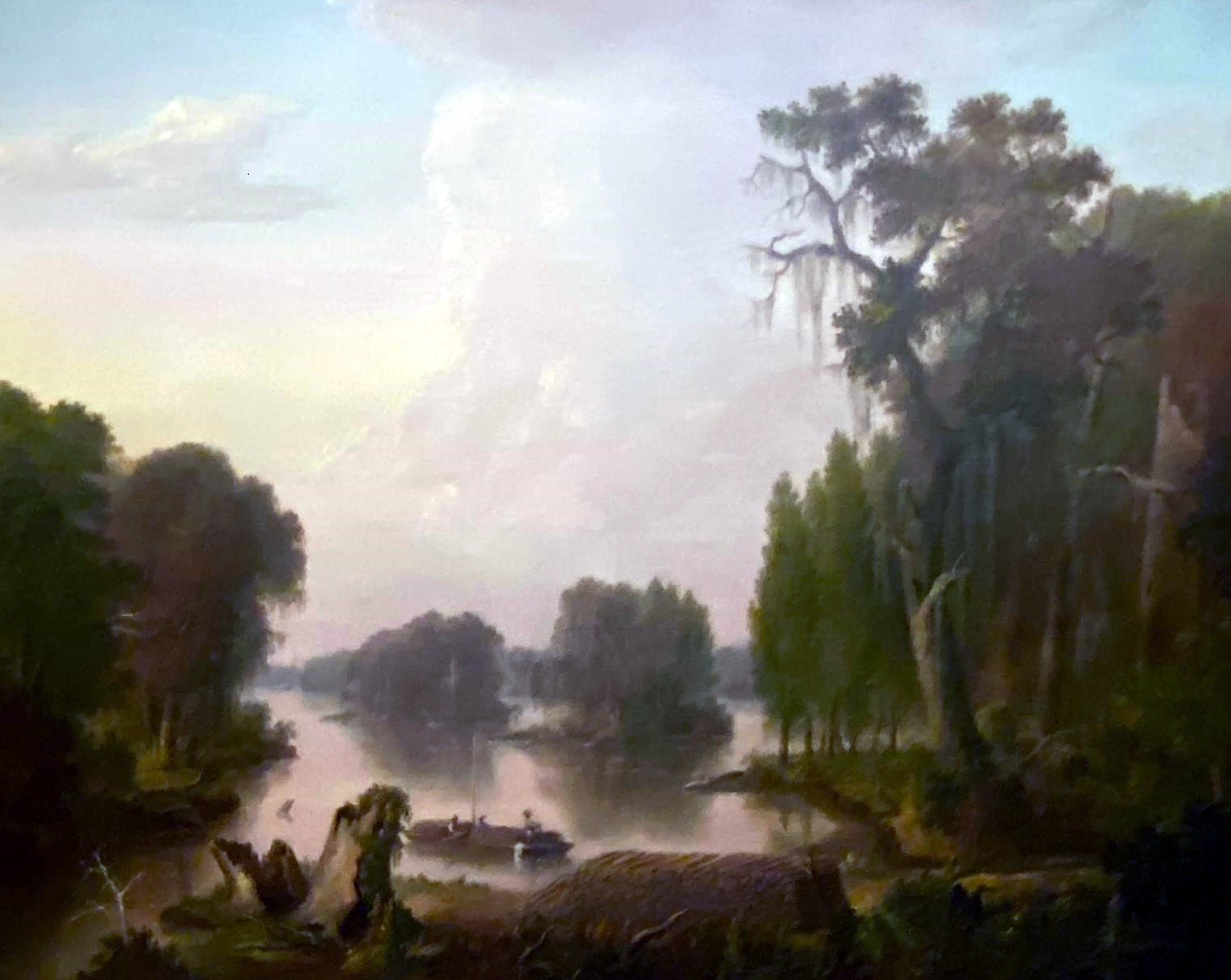
Wooding Up, Rodney, Mississippi by Robert Brammer (fl. 1842–1853) depicts three men gathering lumber for steamship fuel on the Mississippi River near Rodney.

Rodney, directly on the water with the Mississippi River running parallel to its major streets, emerged as a thriving river port. It was the primary shipping location for Jefferson County and areas as far as Brookhaven, Mississippi, about one week east of Rodney by horseback. According to historian Keri Watson, enslaved dockworkers loaded "millions of pounds of cotton" onto steamboats bound for New Orleans. Due to a shortage of legal tender, cotton receipts became a de facto currency. During this period, many of the coins that were available were Spanish picayunes and bits.

Rodney became a cultural center and incorporated in 1828. Rodney resident Rush Nutt demonstrated effective methods of powering cotton gins with steam engines in 1830. The importation of different types of cotton seeds resulted in the breeding of a disease-resistant and easy-to-harvest hybrid that became known as Petit Gulf cotton. The seed business in Rodney served customers as far away as the North Carolina Piedmont. The development of Petit Gulf cotton and the Indian Removal Act of 1830 spurred a westward land rush. Many early settlers of Texas crossed through Rodney; their wagons were poled across the water on flatboat ferries to St. Joseph, Louisiana. From 1820 to 1830, Rodney was the primary Mississippi River crossing for Americans migrating to the Southwest.

Several historic structures were built during this time, including Rodney Presbyterian Church, U.S. President Zachary Taylor's plantation, and portions of Alcorn University, which was originally a Presbyterian college. The initial building that was used for church services in Rodney doubled as a tavern, serving alcohol outside of Sundays. In 1829, the first steps were taken to erect the red-brick Presbyterian church. One year later, the Presbyterian Oakland College was chartered. The college drew funding, students, and teachers from Rodney, but it was built on 250 acres (100 ha) just north of the town. Reverend J. R. Hutchinson, an early preacher at the Presbyterian church, said this was because "no town or city in the Southwest was deemed sufficiently healthy or sufficiently moral to be the seat of a college." In its first few years, the college operated from six cottages. Construction began on the college's main building, the Greek-revival Oakland Memorial Chapel in 1838. Zachary Taylor's Cypress Grove Plantation, Nutt's Laurel Hill, and other plantation homes were built around Rodney during this period. The majority of enslaved residents lived in bare log cabins with clay chimneys and dirt floors. Some larger plantations erected brick cabins, and Dugal McCall, who operated the sawmill near Rodney, erected frame structures with separate apartments.

Before the American Civil War, the town had two newspapers; The Southern Telegraph and Rodney Gazette. In 1836, the tagline of The Southern Telegraph was: "He that will not reason, is a bigot; he that cannot, is a fool; and he that dare not, is a slave". The early regional newspapers in Mississippi were typically one-room offices printing short papers on a single broadsheet. They carried little in the way of local news, printing instead notices, poetry, recipes, biased editorial, advertisements, and reprinted news from larger papers.

By the 1840s, growth was slowing; a Mississippi guidebook stated: "Its progress, some years ago, was very rapid, and much improvement was made, but it has been reputed to be very unhealthy, and, of late years, it has improved but very little". At that time, the town had several stores and "commission houses", a grist mill, a saw mill, and a church.

=== Civil War ===
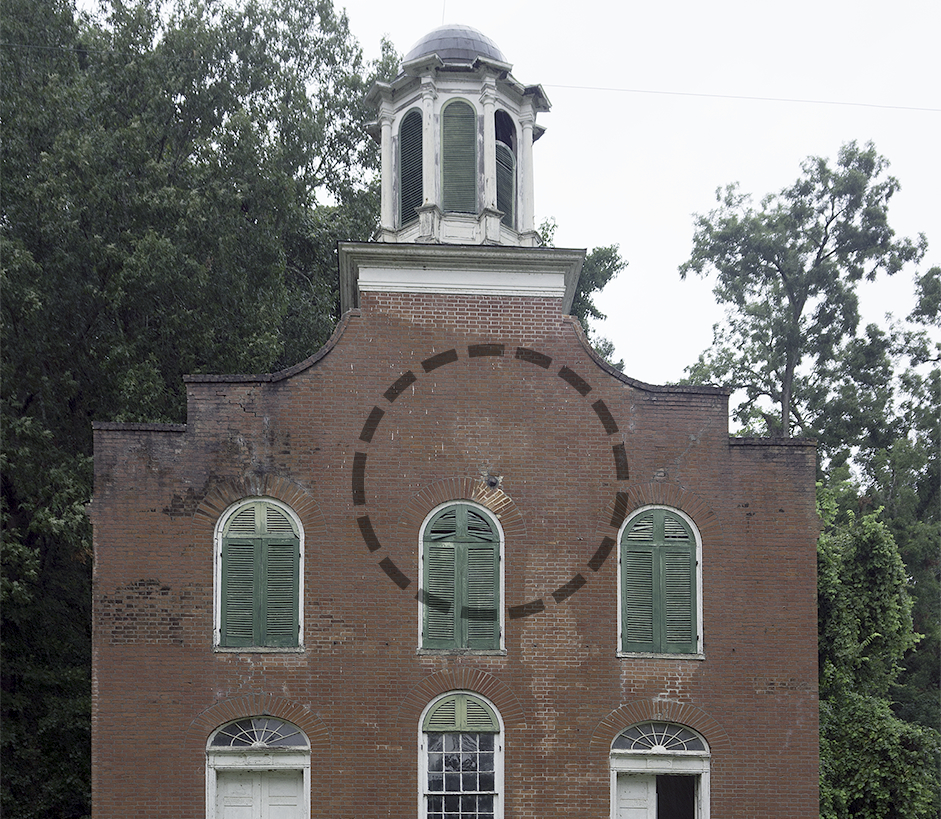
Former First Presbyterian Church, with cannonball (circled) embedded above the center second-floor window

During the Civil War, a group of Union Army soldiers were captured at Rodney Presbyterian Church. Part of the Union's strategy during the Civil War was the plan to advance down the Mississippi River, dividing the Confederacy in half. The Union's ship USS Rattler, a side-wheel steamboat, was retrofitted into a lightly armored warship. After the Union captured the fortress city of Vicksburg, it took control of river traffic on the Mississippi. Rattler was one of many ships tasked with maintaining this control by preventing Confederate crossings. In September 1863, Rattler was anchored in the river near Rodney's landing. Much of the town, including the surviving red-brick church, was visible from the water.

When Reverend Baker from the Red Lick Presbyterian Church traveled to Rodney via steamboat, he invited Rattler's crew to go ashore and attend services in what was still Confederate territory. On Sunday, September 13, 1863, seventeen men departed from Rattler to attend the 11 a.m. service. Only a single crew member took a firearm to the service. Confederate cavalry surrounded the building when the music was loud enough to cover their approach. The troops entered the building and quickly captured the Northern soldiers with some assistance from members of the congregation.

When reports reached the ship, Rattler began to fire upon the town; a cannonball lodged into the church above the balcony window. The shelling ceased when Confederate soldiers threatened to execute their Union prisoners. Lt. Commander James A. Greer aboard USS Benton anchored upstream near Natchez and admonished Rattler's captain for acting as a civilian during a time of war. He issued orders to arrest any officer found "leaving his vessel to go on shore under any circumstances".

=== Decline ===
Rodney Hotel and adjacent Pape store in 1940 (two angles)

In 1860, Rodney was home to banks, newspapers, schools, a lecture hall, Mississippi's first opera house, a hotel, and over 35 stores. At its peak, thousands of people resided in the town.

During the Civil War, the Mississippi River began to change course. A sand bar developed upstream and pushed the river west, and Rodney's former shipping channel became a swamp. After the river changed course, Rodney gradually went from a major port to a ghost town. The Rodney Landing was relocated several miles away from the town itself. Many male residents who left the town during the war never returned, and many businesses permanently closed. In 1869, a fire burned most of the town's buildings, but the Presbyterian church survived. In 1880, German and Irish immigrants arrived and opened new businesses. The town endured outbreaks of yellow fever. The railroad bypassed the town, running through Fayette, Jefferson County's seat of government, and Rodney's landing was abandoned. There are no records of any boats using the landing after 1900.

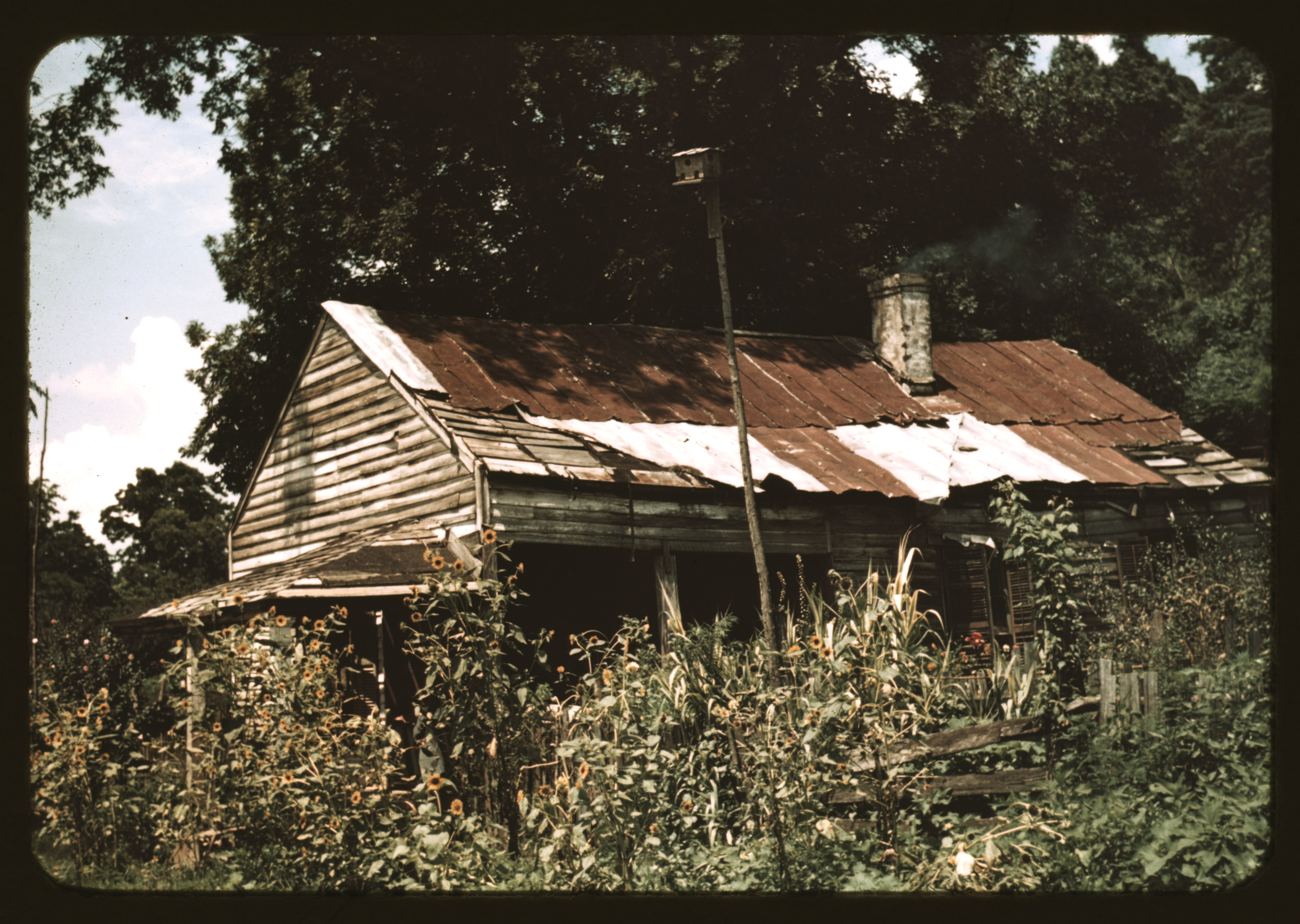
A home nearly obscured by sunflowers circa 1940

Some residents remained, including an African-American man Bob Smith, who had been Rodney's marshal during the Reconstruction era and operated a small, wood-framed hotel into the 1920s, known among travelers for its "delicious meals served in a crude dining room". Smith served "fried chicken, hot cakes, fish, figs, etc. in season" and "great stacks of savory froglegs."

In 1930, Governor Theodore G. Bilbo disincorporated Rodney. By 1938, Mississippi: A Guide to the Magnolia State described Rodney as "a ghost river town" that had died when the railroad passed it by. Novelist Eudora Welty found the town in ruins and used Rodney as a setting in her works, including the novella The Robber Bridegroom. Welty wrote: "The river had gone, three miles away, beyond sight and smell, beyond the dense trees. It came back only in flood." Photographer Marion Post Wolcott documented Rodney for the Farm Security Administration circa 1940 and described it as a "fantastic deserted town".

=== Extant structures ===
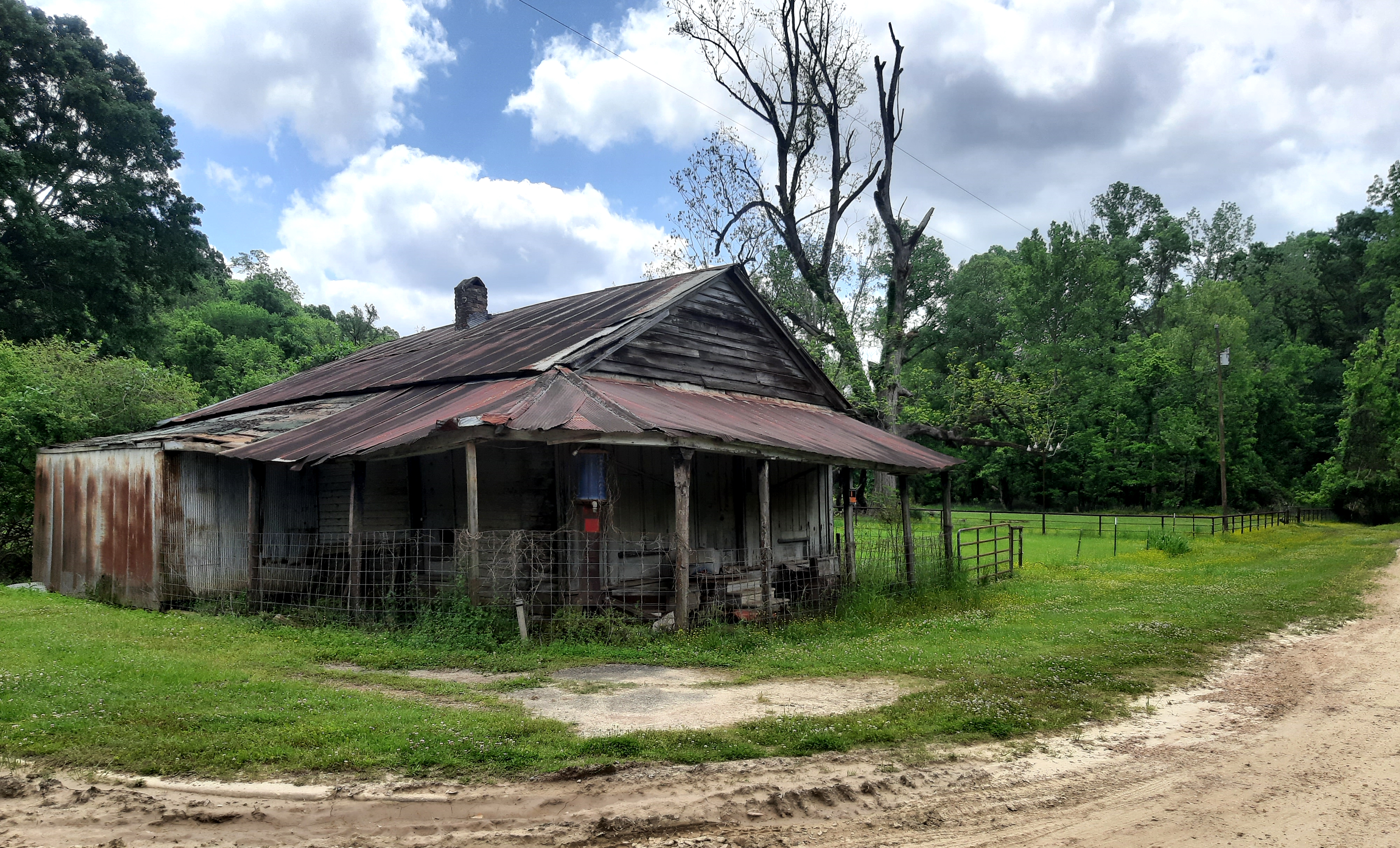
Alston's Grocery Store, one of the few remaining structures

A ruined cemetery, several stores, two churches, and few houses remain, in various states of disrepair. Alston's Grocery, which was built circa 1840, is south of the Presbyterian Church at what was once the intersection of Commerce Street and Rodney Road. The Sacred Heart Catholic Church was built in Rodney circa 1868, and the entire building was relocated to Grand Gulf Military State Park in 1983. The gable-front Masonic lodge was built circa 1890. Only a small number of people still live in the area and most of the remaining buildings are abandoned.

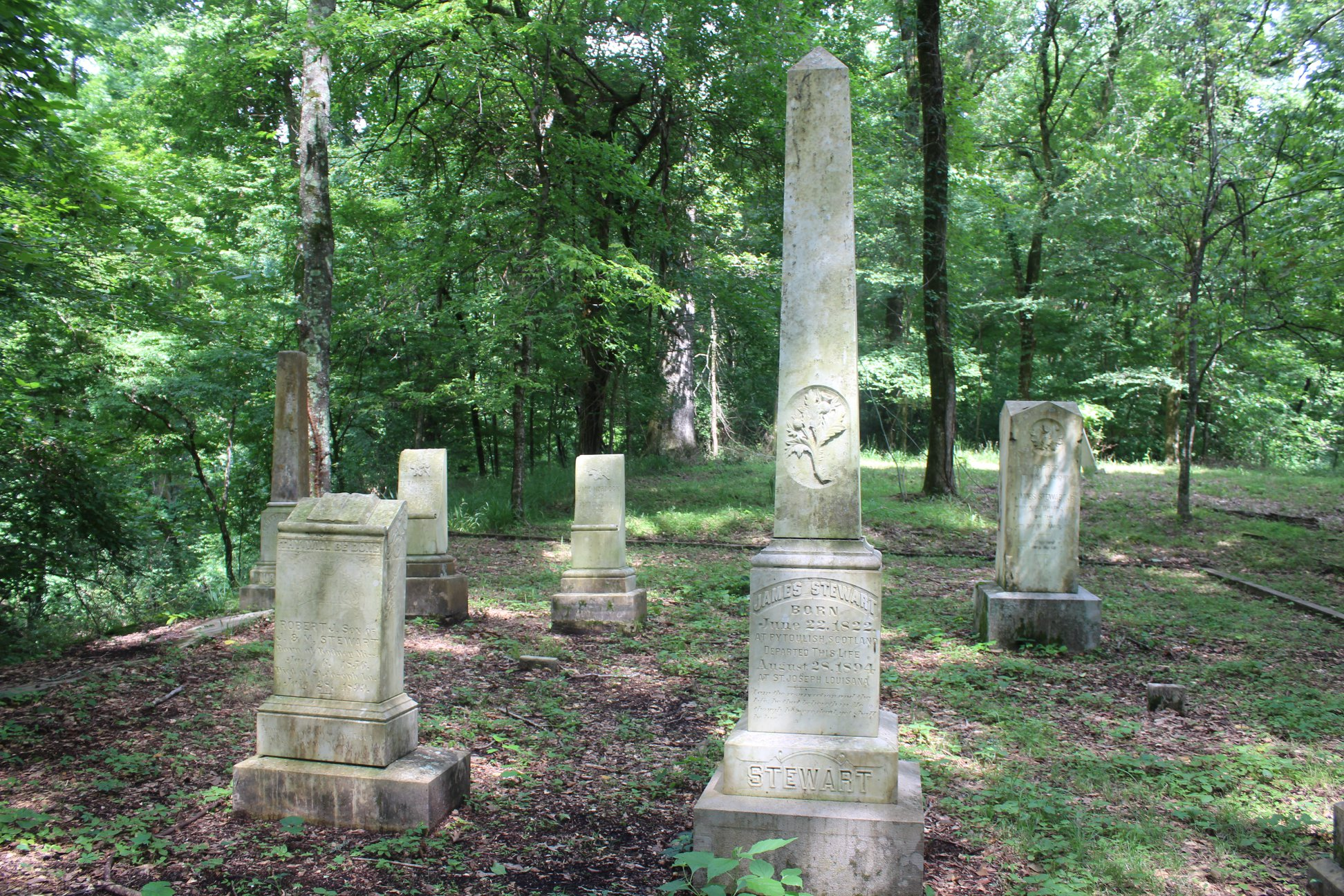
Graves on the hill behind Rodney Presbyterian Church

The red-brick Rodney Presbyterian Church, which was built in 1832, is a federal-style church and the oldest remaining building in Rodney. The Presbyterian church has fanlights above the doors similar to federal-style homes in Mississippi, like Rosalie Mansion. The church's interior was lit with oil lamps and heated with a pair of stoves. A slave gallery in the rear can be accessed by a side door leading into a narrow, winding staircase. It was built on ground high enough to escape the town's regular flooding and has been on the National Register of Historic Places since 1972. The Rodney History and Preservation Society purchased the church to conduct repairs. When the church was being restored, the hole created by Union cannonfire during the Civil War was retained and a replica cannonball was placed in the exterior wall. Atop the hill adjacent to the church is a cemetery with graves dating back over a century. It contains the graves of early settlers from across the river in Louisiana who took their dead to be buried on high ground above the floodplain.

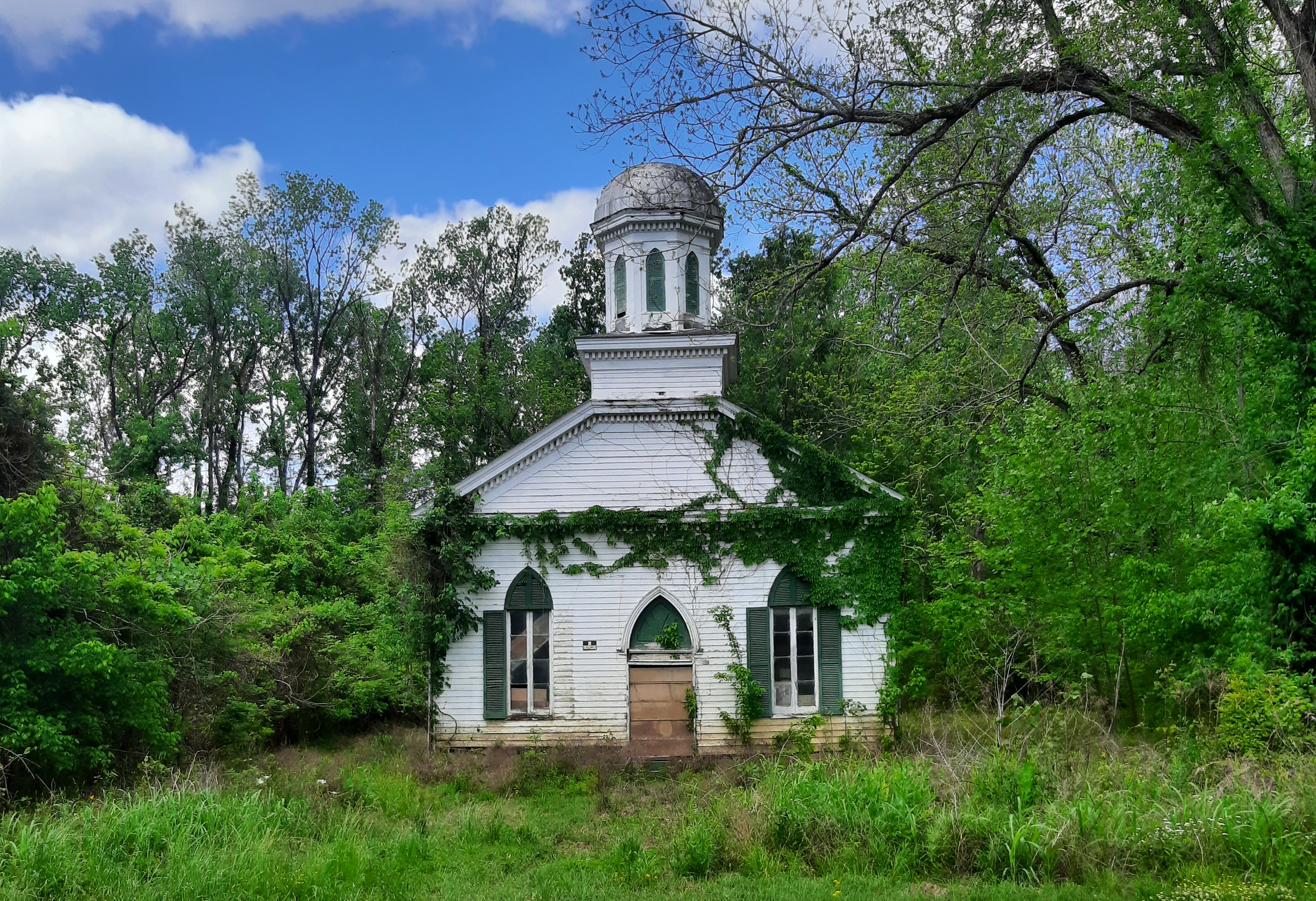
Mt. Zion Baptist Church, overgrown with vines

Mount Zion Baptist Church, which was built in 1851, uses a combination of architectural styles. The pointed arches are Greek Revival, the pedimented gable is Gothic Revival, and the domed cupola is federal style. Mount Zion Baptist originally had a white congregation and became a predominantly African American church after white residents began to abandon the town; it is now completely abandoned. Changes in the course of the Mississippi River have resulted in repeated flooding. The structure shows signs of flood damage, including water lines and rotted floors. A road sign pointing towards the church becomes visible in autumn when the leaves fall away from the vines overgrowing the signpost. Surviving members of the church formed the Greater Mount Zion Church several miles away and outside the flood zone.

== Geography ==
Rodney is located near the southern end of the Natchez Trace, a forest trail that stretches for hundreds of miles across North America. The Trace was started by animal migration along a geologic ridge line. The town is approximately 32 miles (51 km) northeast of Natchez, south of Bayou Pierre, and about 2 miles (3.2 km) inland from the east bank of the Mississippi River. The town site is situated on loess bluffs that are within the Mississippi River watershed and were once adjacent to the river. Wetlands, including a lake that roughly follows the river's old course, are immediately west of the town. The town site is at a relatively low elevation and is prone to seasonal flooding. When the river ran past Rodney, its position on the lower bluffs above steep river banks created an ideal position for a river landing. Civil War–era earthworks are still present atop the bluffs above the town.

== Notable people ==
- James Cessor, member of the Mississippi House of Representatives from 1871 to 1877
- Thomas Hinds Duggan (1815–1865), politician, former member of the Texas Senate
- Bill Foster (1904–1978), baseball player, member of the Baseball Hall of Fame
- Charles Pasquale Greco (1894–1987), Bishop of Alexandria in Louisiana from 1946 to 1973; Supreme Chaplain of the Knights of Columbus from 1961 to 1987
- Levi J. Rowan (1871–1934) academic administrator, college president, teacher, and photographer
- Zachary Taylor (1784–1850), the 12th president of the United States, built his Buena Vista plantation just south of Rodney.
- Reuben C. Weddington, former member of the Arkansas House of Representatives

== See also ==
- Lists of ghost towns in the United States
- Woodlawn Plantation (Jefferson County, Mississippi)
