= Grand Gulf State Park =

Grand Gulf State Park may refer to:

- Grand Gulf State Park (Missouri)
- Grand Gulf Military State Park, a park in Mississippi

== See also ==
- Grand Gulf (disambiguation)
