= Laurel Hill Plantation (Jefferson County, Mississippi) =

Historic location

Coordinates: 31.857105°N 91.176499°W

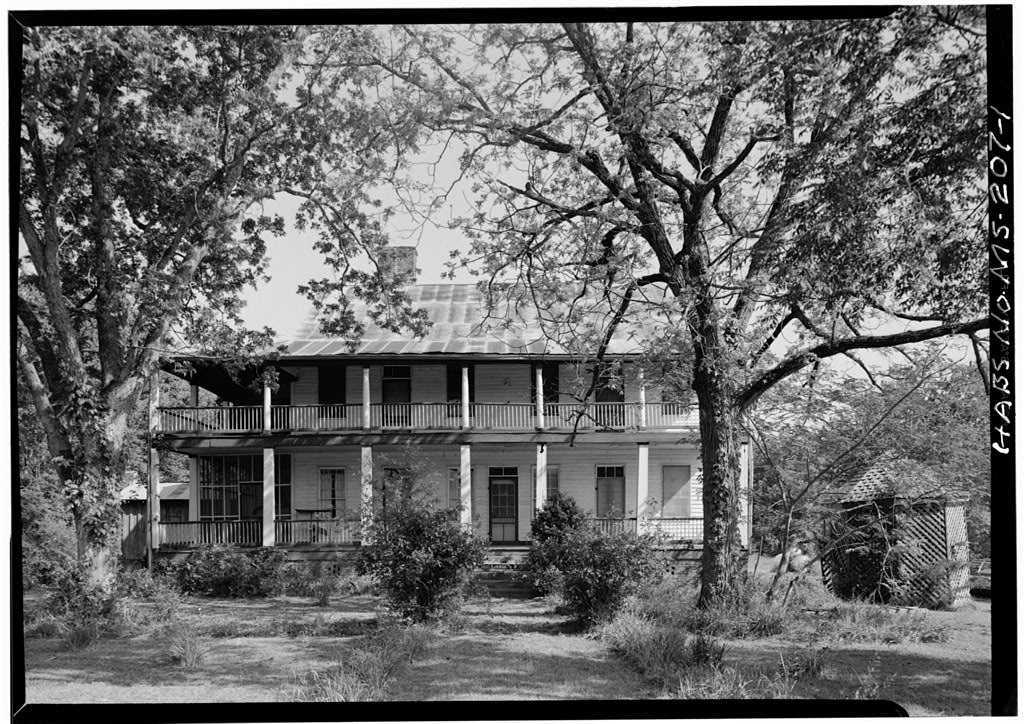
Laurel Hill, photographed 1930s by the Historical American Buildings Survey

The Laurel Hill Plantation in Jefferson County, Mississippi near Rodney, Mississippi, United States, was a historic plantation. It is located about two miles southeast of Rodney, in a bend of the Mississippi River named "Petit Gulf". It is significant for the architecture of its main plantation house and for the development of Petit Gulf cotton, a cotton hybrid, on its property.

The plantation house was built around 1815 for Dr Rush Nutt, a scientist and agriculturalist. Later, it was inherited by his son, Haller Nutt (1816-1864). Rush Nutt developed the cotton hybrid, and was also the first to use steam engine power in operating cotton gins.

It was studied by the Historic American Buildings Survey.

The property is not listed on the National Register of Historic Places, although the National Register's NRIS database shows an entry related to it on January 29, 1983. This may have been a determination of eligibility or a delisting or some other event other than a listing. And the HABS overview page about it states "The building was listed on the National Register of Historic Places on January 29, 1973." Further, and perhaps confusingly, another Mississippi plantation of the same name in Adams County is National Register-listed.
