= Cessor =

Cessor is a surname. Notable people with the surname include:

- James Cessor, American saddle and harness maker, state legislator, and public official
- Loretta C. Manggrum, née Loretta Cessor (1896–1992), American pianist, music educator, and composer of sacred music
