= Rodney Presbyterian Church =

Historic church in Mississippi, United States

- U.S. National Register of Historic Places
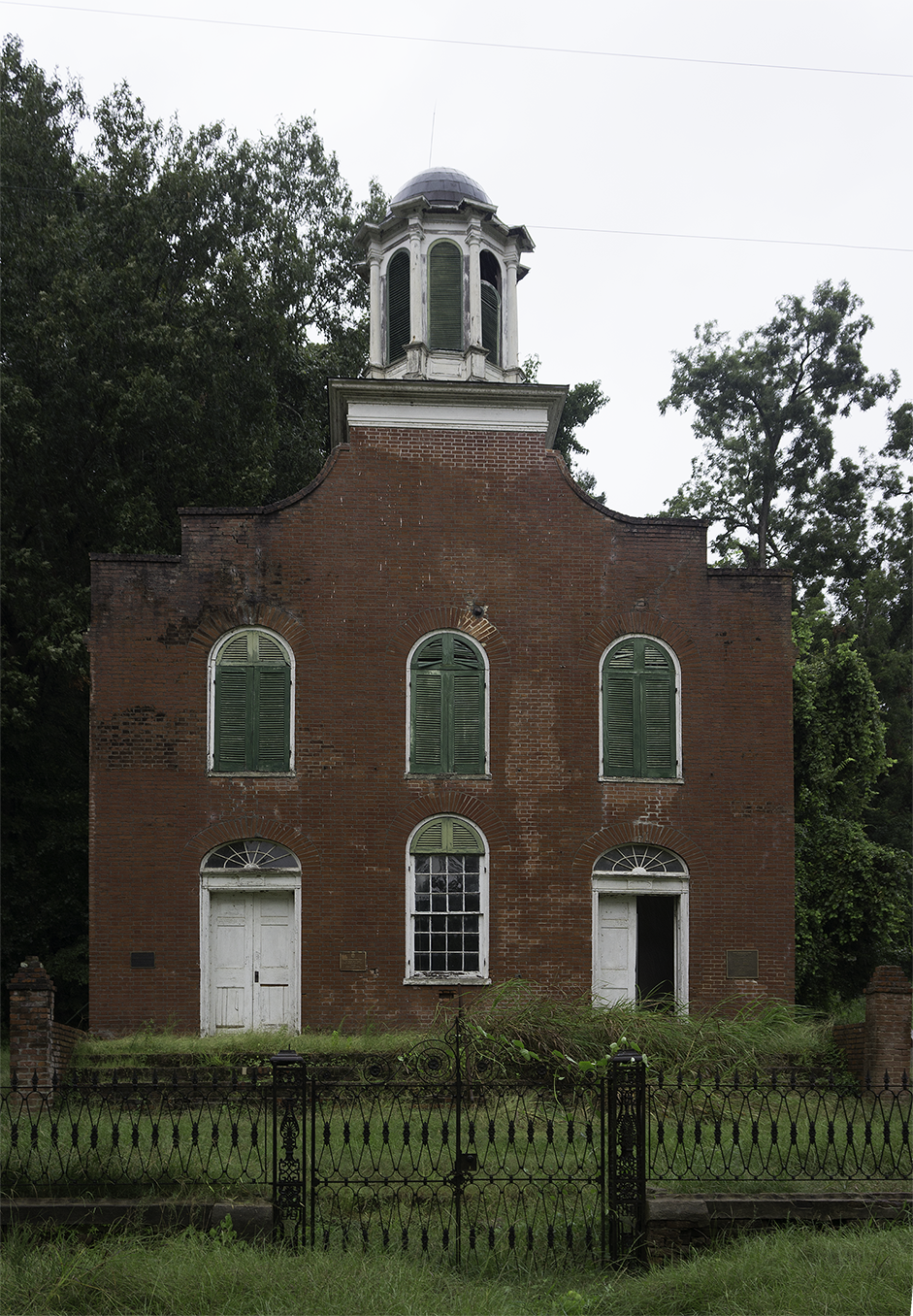
- Rodney Presbyterian Church - 2014

- Location within Mississippi Location within the United States
- Nearest city: Alcorn, Mississippi
- Coordinates: 31.8628°N 91.1998°W
- Area: 22 acres (8.9 ha)
- Built: 1832
- NRHP reference No.: 73001018
- Added to NRHP: February 6, 1973

Rodney Presbyterian Church is a historic church in Rodney, Mississippi, United States.

== History ==
Plantation owner and millionaire David Hunt (1779-1861) of nearby Woodlawn Plantation, also known as "King David," donated the land upon which the church was built. Presbyterian Reverend Jeremiah Chamberlain began the building of the church in 1829.

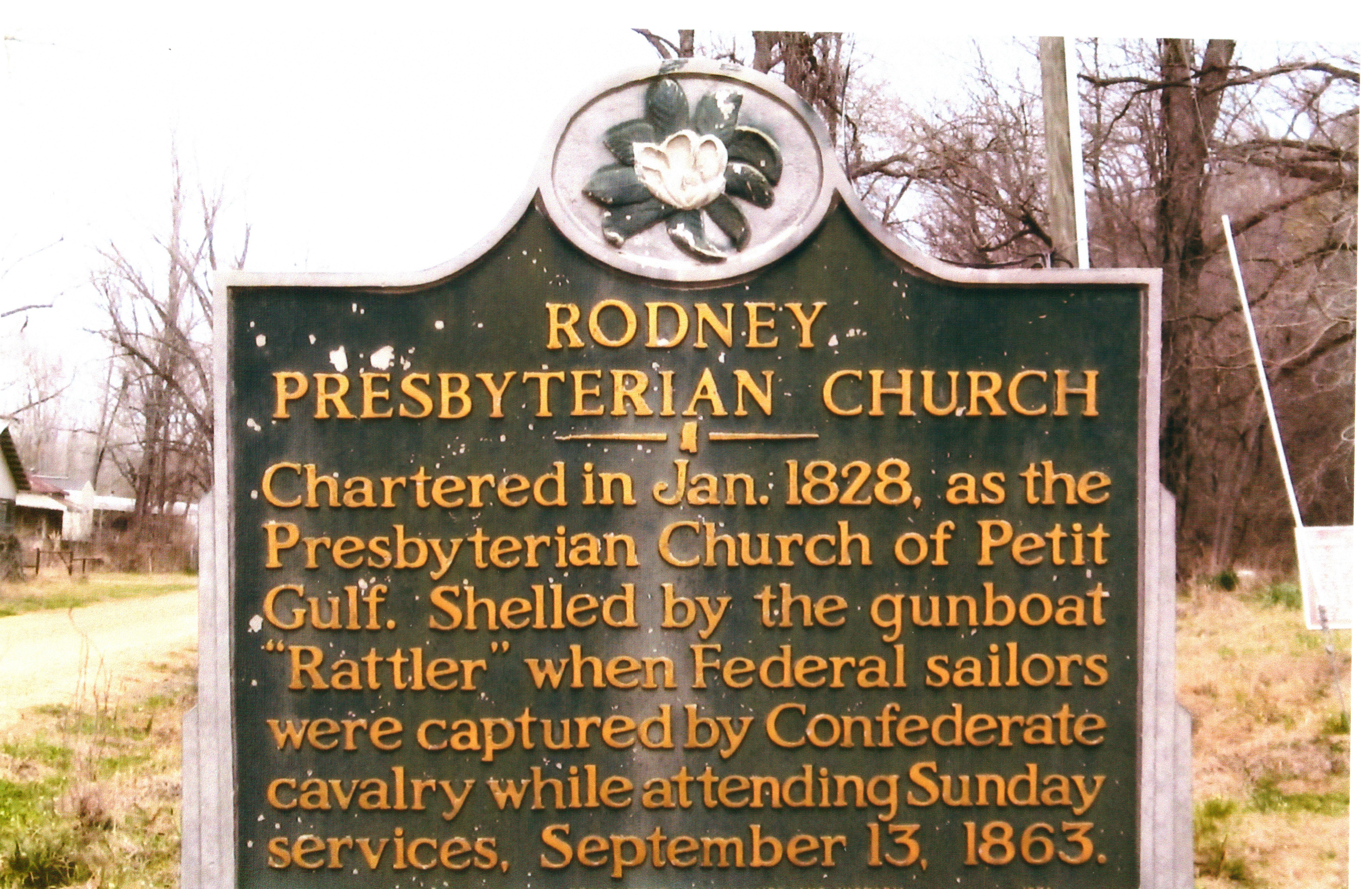
Rodney Presbyterian Church Historic Marker

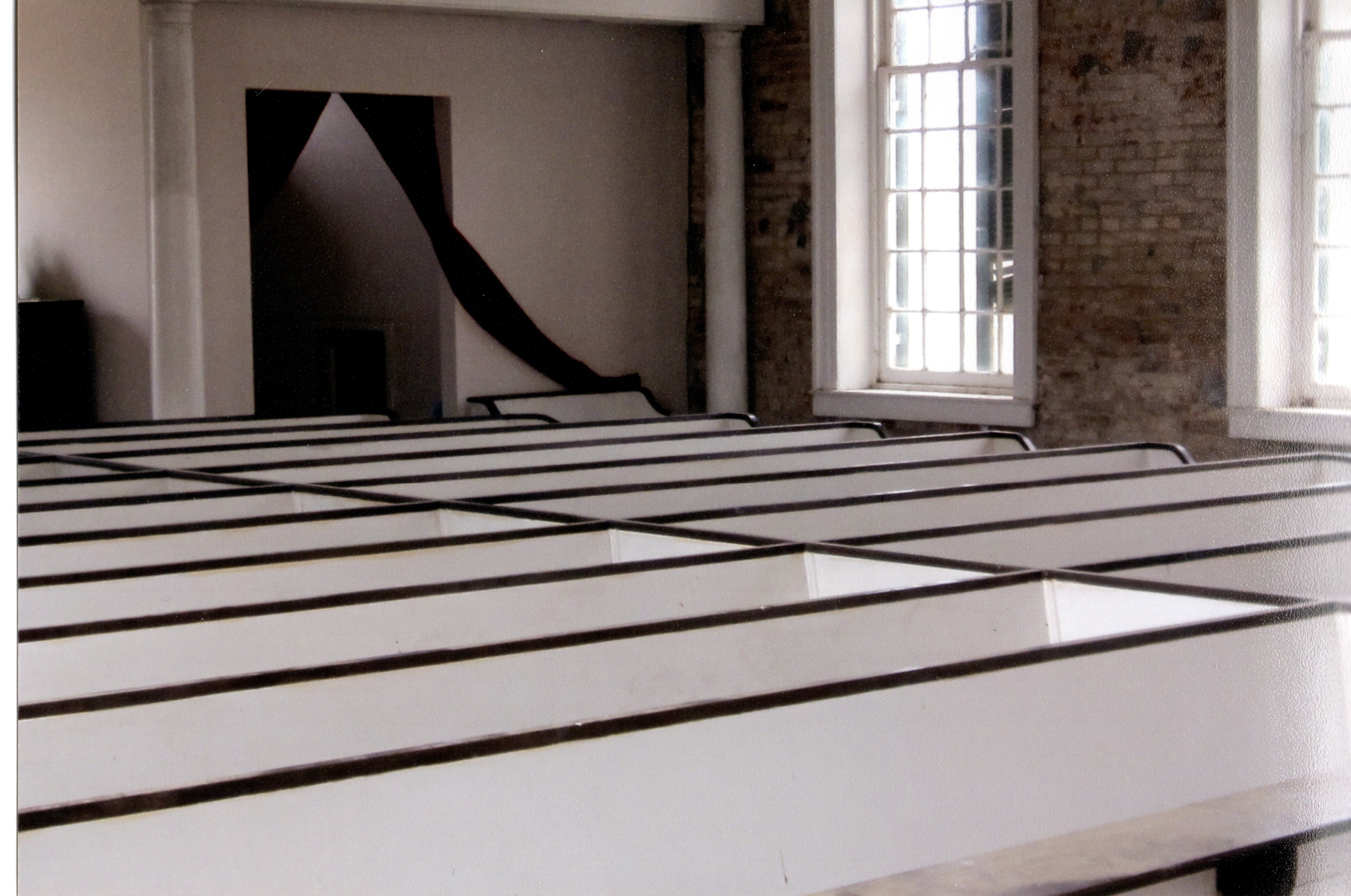
Rodney Presbyterian Church Sanctuary

The church building was built from 1829 to 1832 in the Federal architectural style. It was built with red bricks, "rounded archives, "a stepped gable" and "an octagonal bell tower."

The church played a specific role during the American Civil War of 1861-1865. On Sunday, September 13, 1863, Reverend Baker invited crew members of the Union USS Rattler gunboat to attend his service. However, Confederates burst into the church to arrest them. When other Union crew members found out about the Confederate violation of Sunday truce, they fired a cannonball at the church, which damaged its front wall. The damage is still visible to this day.

Eliza Ogden, daughter of Abner Nash Ogden was attending the service at Rodney Presbyterian when the skirmish happened on September 13, 1863. She was a school friend of David Hunt's daughter Elizabeth. During the altercation, a man seated next to her hoisted her up and pushed her out a window. Just as she exited the window, a bullet struck and lodged in the same window frame. She hurt her ankle from the fall. In later years, she would pull a bullet out of a box in her room and tell the story to Elizabeth Hunt Ogden's children about the incident.

It has been listed on the National Register of Historic Places since 1973.

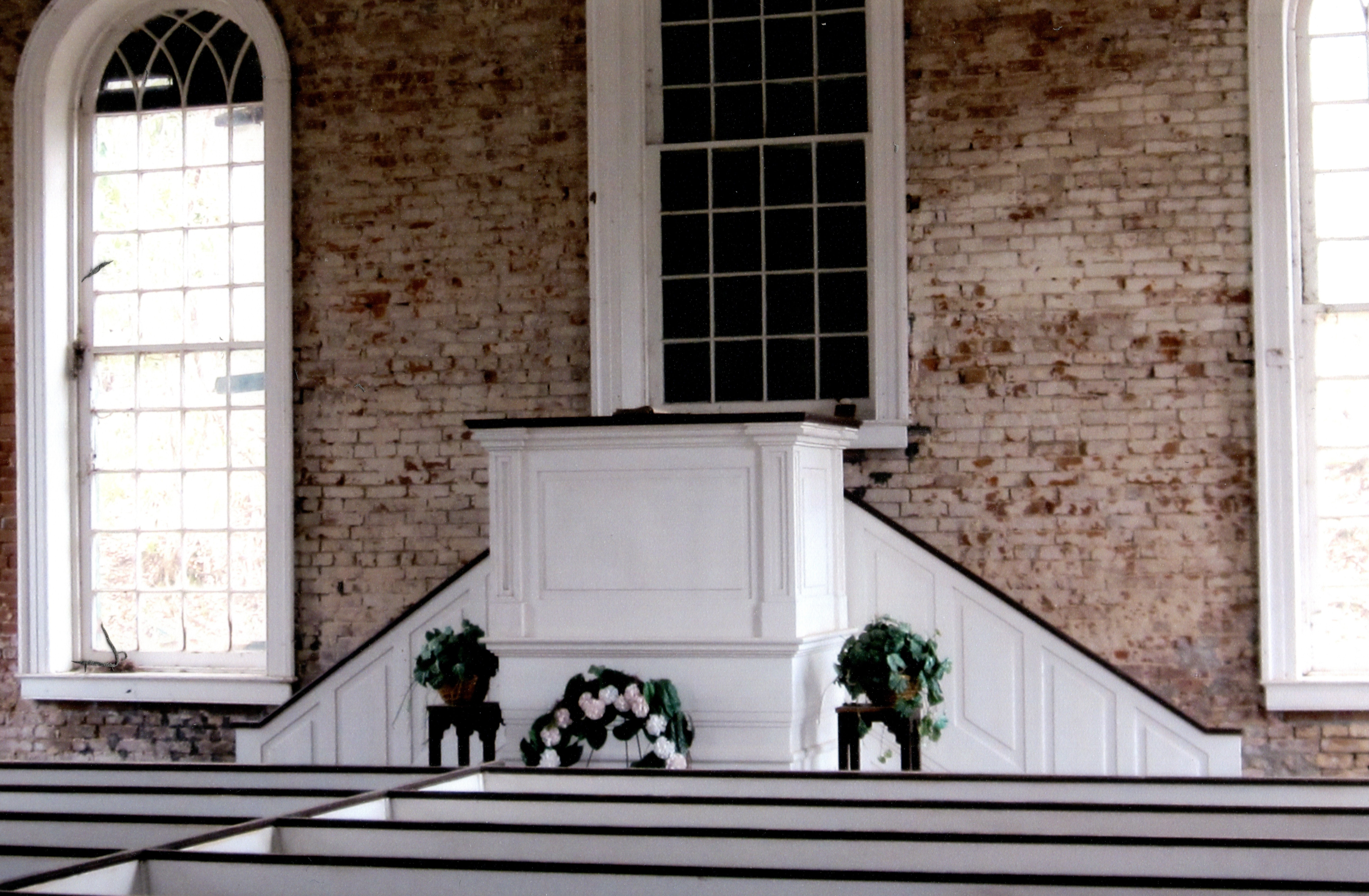
Rodney Presbyterian Church Pulpit
