= Grand Gulf =

Grand Gulf may refer to:

- Grand Gulf, Mississippi
- USS Grand Gulf (1863)
- Grand Gulf State Park (Missouri)
- Grand Gulf Military State Park, a park in Mississippi
- Battle of Grand Gulf

== See also ==
- Grand Gulf Mound
- Grand Gulf Nuclear Generating Station
- Petite Gulf
