= Reuben C. Weddington =

Arkansas state representative

Member of the Arkansas House of Representatives
- In office 1891

Personal details
- Born: Rodney, Mississippi, U.S.
- Education: Alcorn University
- Occupation: Politician

Reuben C. Weddington was an American state representative in Arkansas. A Republican, he served in the Arkansas House of Representatives in 1891. He represented Desha County.

Weddington was born in Rodney, Mississippi. He studied at Alcorn University. He was a public school principal in Red Lick, Mississippi for four years before moving to Arkansas in 1887 where he settled in Arkansas City and was principal of a graded school.

His photograph was included in a montage of the 11 African American legislators in the Arkansas Legislature in 1891.
