= USS Rattler =

Steamboat of the Union Navy during the American Civil War

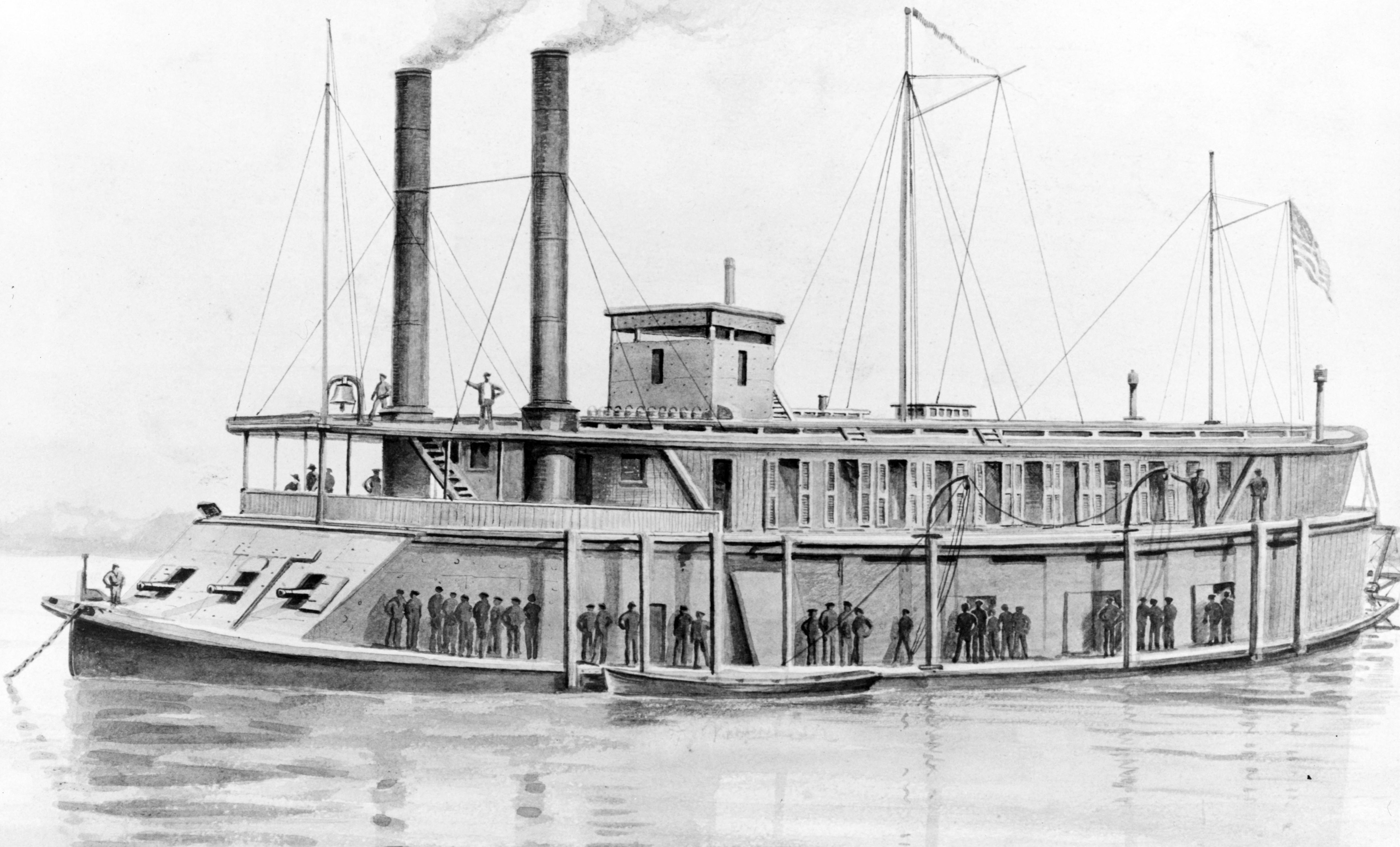
- USS Rattler

History

United States
- Launched: 1862
- Acquired: 11 November 1862
- Commissioned: 19 December 1862
- Out of service: 30 December 1864
- Fate: Sank, 30 December 1864

General characteristics
- Displacement: 165 tons
- Length: ~170 feet
- Propulsion: steam engine; stern-wheel propelled
- Armament: 2 × 30-pounder Parrott rifles; 4 × 24-pounder guns

USS Rattler was a steamer acquired by the Union Navy during the American Civil War. She was used by the Navy to patrol navigable waterways of the Confederate States of America, especially the Mississippi River, and to be employed as a gunboat when required.

== Service history ==
Florence Miller, a wooden stern-wheel steamer built at Cincinnati, Ohio, in 1862, was purchased by the Navy there on 11 November 1862; she was renamed Rattler on 5 December 1862, and commissioned on 19 December 1862 at Cairo, Illinois, with Acting Master Amos Longthorne in command. With Rattler in the lead, sounding as she went along, Admiral David Dixon Porter's Mississippi Squadron ascended the White and Arkansas Rivers to attack Fort Hindman at Arkansas Post on 10 January 1863, in a joint Army-Navy expedition as part of the larger campaign against Vicksburg, Mississippi. While the other gunboats bombarded Fort Hindman, Rattler closed within 50 yards of the Confederate guns in an unsuccessful effort to clear away a barrier of chevaux-de-frise and was forced by heavy fire to return to station.

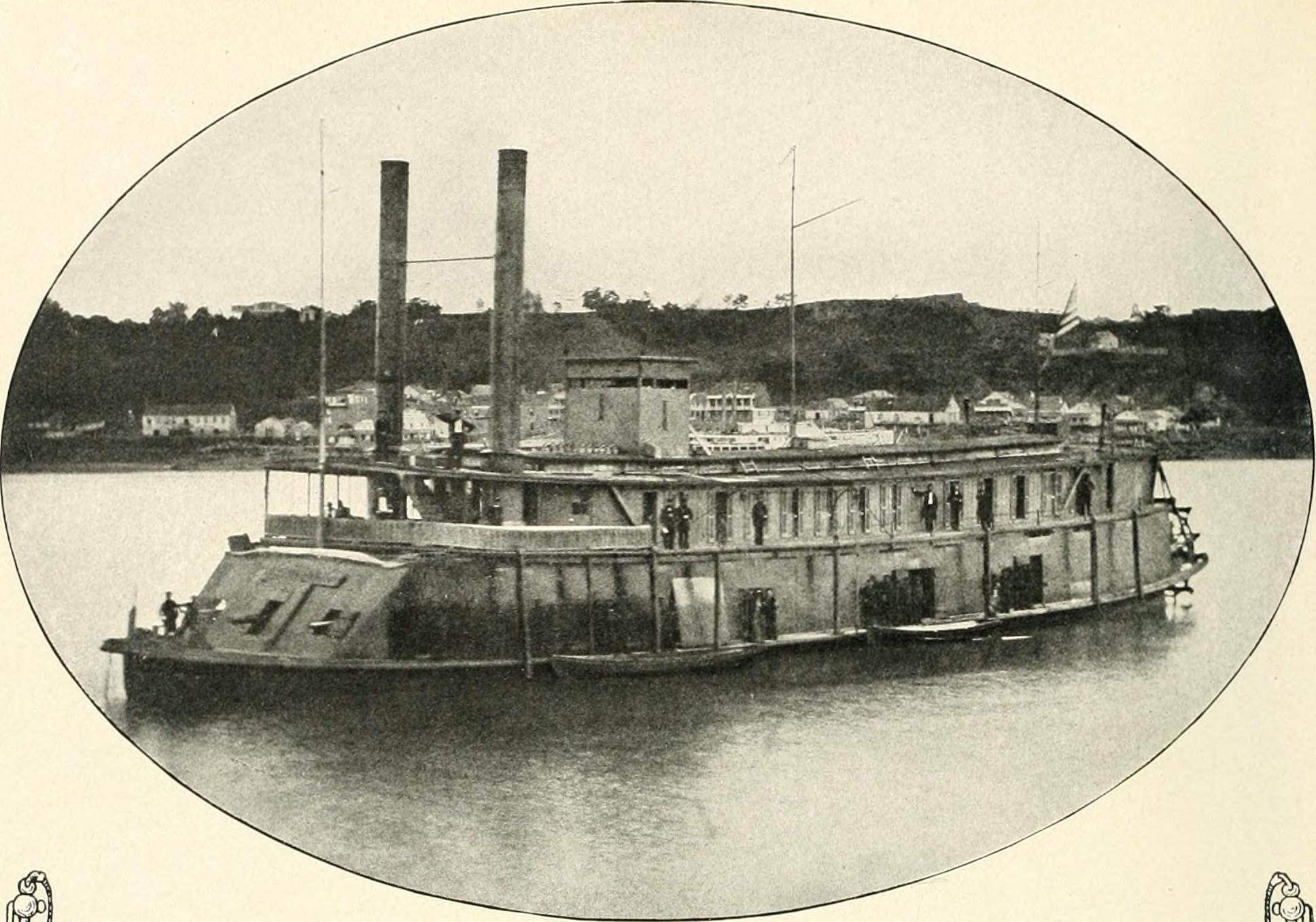
Rattler during the Vicksburg Campaign

The next day, Rattler and USS Glide dashed past the fort to enfilade the Confederate position; their guns drove the Rebel troops out of rifle pits allowing Federal troops under General William T. Sherman to reach the fort unopposed. The gunboat's cannonade forced the Rebel commander to surrender Fort Hindman and some 6,500 Confederate troops. Rattler next served as flagship of a flotilla of "tinclads" and Army transports carrying 6,000 men of General Sherman's Corps during the Yazoo Pass expedition, an abortive attempt to bypass and isolate Vicksburg by means of bayous. The expedition failed in attacks against Fort Pemberton on 11–13 March at the confluence of the Yalobusha and Tallahatchie Rivers. During the action, Rattler lost one man killed and another wounded by fire from the riverbanks.

After the success of the campaign against Vicksburg, on 4 July 1863, Porter's squadron controlled the entire Mississippi River now "unvexed to the sea." From 12 to 20 July, Rattler joined in raids up the Red, Black, Tensas, and Ouachita Rivers. During these operations, she teamed with USS Manitou to capture the Confederate steamer Louisville (later USS Ouachita) on the Little Red River. In the late summer, Rattler patrolled the Mississippi River near Rodney, Mississippi, above Natchez, Mississippi, to intercept crossing attempts by Confederate forces, inspect river craft, and convoy supply boats, helping to seal off the South from supplies and manpower west of the mighty river. On 13 September 1863, Rattler's commanding officer, Acting Master E. H. Fentress, and 16 crewmen were captured by Rebel guerrillas while attending church at Rodney. After this incident, the gunboat patrolled the river near Rodney for over a year.

On 30 December 1864, during a heavy gale near Grand Gulf, Mississippi, Rattler's anchor cable parted and she was driven ashore, struck a snag, and sank. After her supplies and most of her guns were salvaged, she was abandoned. Rebel troops subsequently set Rattler afire and destroyed her.
