= Rush Nutt =

Mississippian planter, physician, and scientist

- Born: 1781; Northumberland County, Virginia, United States
- Died: 1837 (aged 55–56); Natchez, Mississippi, US
- Resting place: Longwood
- Education: University of Pennsylvania
- Occupation: Planter
- Spouse: Eliza Ker
- Children: 7, Haller Nutt
- Parent(s): Richard Turner Nutt; Elizabeth Rawlings
- Relatives: David Ker (father in law)

Rush Nutt (1781–1837) was a planter, medical doctor, and scientist in Mississippi. He was the founder of Laurel Hill Plantation and discovered Petit Gulf cotton. He is a former justice of the Jefferson County court in Mississippi.

== Early life ==
Nutt was born as Rushworth Nutt to Richard Turner Nutt and Elizabeth Rawlings in Northumberland County, Virginia. Nutt studied under Dr. Benjamin Rush at the University of Pennsylvania. Nutt changed his name from Rushworth to Rush after Dr. Benjamin Rush.

== Career ==
Nutt moved to the West in 1805 to Jefferson County, Mississippi and established the Laurel Hill Plantation. He established Oakland College. He built the first brick church in Rodney. He toured Egypt, Jerusalem, Syria, Turkey, and Greece. He was the first American to visit those regions. He wrote about his travels, agriculture and scientific studies.

Nutt developed the "Petit Gulf", a hybrid strain, in 1833. He developed the Egypto-Mexican hybrid cotton in 1841. The cotton strands he developed were easier to pick and more resistant to disease and parasites.

An article about his trips to Chkickasaw tribes was published in 1947 called "Nutt's Trip to the Chickasaw Country" in the Journal of Mississippi History by Jesse D. Jennings. He served as an appointed Justice in the court of Jefferson County, Mississippi.

== Personal life ==
Nutt's first wife died six months after their marriage.

Nutt married Eliza Ker, his second marriage, on 23 March 1808. She was the daughter of Judge David Ker. They had seven children. His son was Haller Nutt, was a planter who supported the Union during the United States Civil War. According to Haller Nutt's listed property in 1860, he owned 42,947 acres and 800 slaves.
