= Haller Nutt =

Mississippi cotton planter (1816–1864)

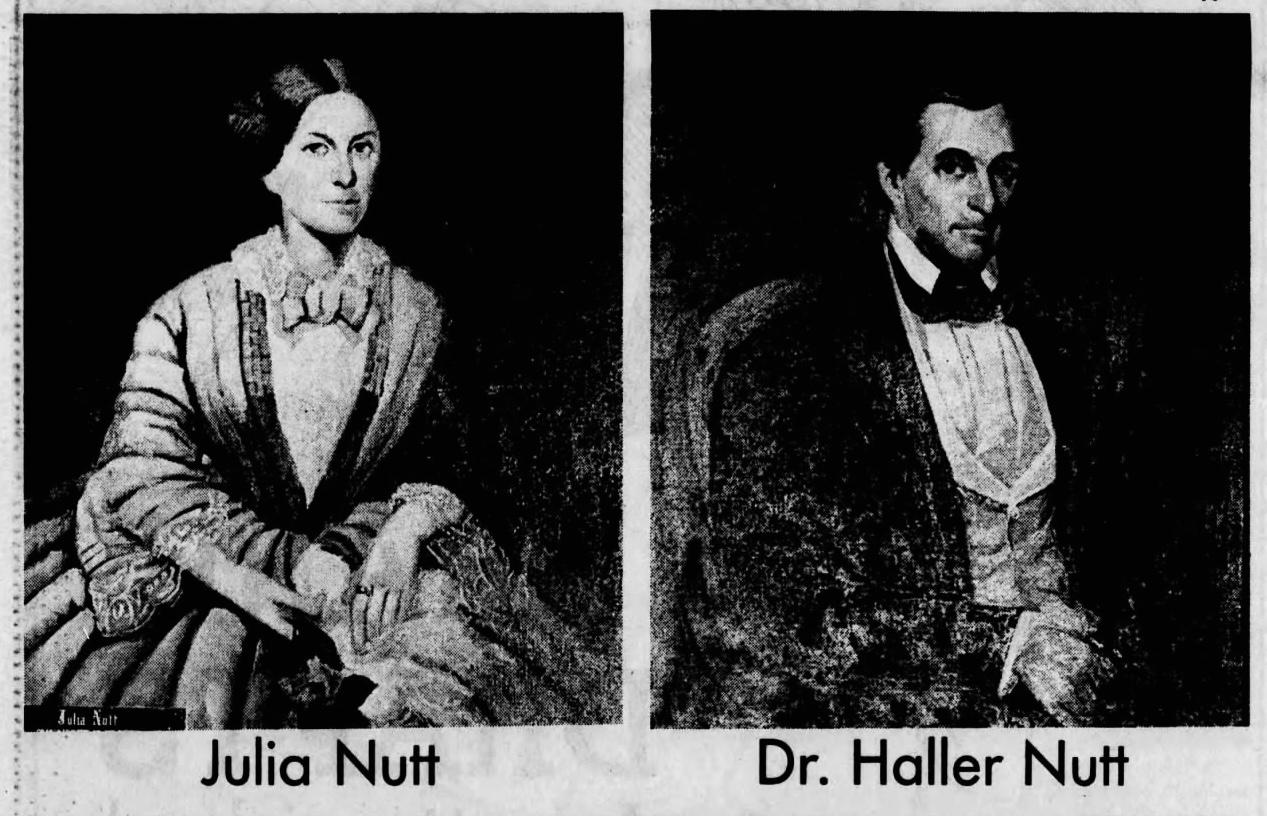
- Born: February 17, 1816; Laurel Hill Plantation, Mississippi Territory, US
- Died: June 15, 1864 (aged 48); Natchez, Mississippi, US
- Resting place: Longwood
- Education: University of Virginia
- Occupation: Planter
- Spouse: Julia Augusta Williams Nutt
- Children: 11
- Parent(s): Rush Nutt; Mary (Ker) Nutt
- Relatives: David Ker (maternal grandfather)

Haller Nutt (1816–1864) was a cotton plantation owner and agronomist in Mississippi. He developed a strain of cotton that became important commercially for the Deep South.

== Early life ==
Haller Nutt was born on February 17, 1816, on Laurel Hill Plantation in Jefferson County, Mississippi. His father was Dr. Rush Nutt, son of Richard Nutt of Northumberland County, Virginia. His maternal grandfather was David Ker, the first presiding professor (later known as university president) of the University of North Carolina at Chapel Hill and later a Judge of the Mississippi Supreme Court.

Nutt was educated at the University of Virginia in Charlottesville, Virginia from 1832 to 1835.

== Career ==
Nutt returned to Mississippi and helped his father manage the Laurel Hill Plantation. Rush Nutt had developed and marketed a cotton cultivar called Petit Gulf; beginning in 1841, Haller Nutt developed and marketed a cotton cultivar known as Egypto-Mexican.

He owned several plantations, including:

- the Araby Plantation in Louisiana.
- the Evergreen Plantation in Louisiana.
- the Winter Quarters Plantation in Louisiana.
- the Cloverdale Plantation in Mississippi.
- the Laurel Hill Plantation in Mississippi.
- the Longwood Plantation in Mississippi.

He mainly grew cash crops, including cotton and sugar cane. These plantations brought him considerable wealth. He made a net profit of more than $228,000 (~$6.47 million in 2024) from agricultural enterprises in 1860. He owned 43,000 acres (170 km^{2}) of land and 800 slaves. His fortune prior to the Civil War was estimated at more than three million dollars.

He suffered large financial losses during the American Civil War due to the destruction of his cotton fields and real estate. However, General Grant spared the Winter Quarters plantation because Nutt was pro-Union. Nevertheless, the expropriation of stores and supplies by the Union and Confederate armies led to the foreclosure on Nutt's plantations in Louisiana. After the war his son, Prentiss Nutt, lobbied in favor of a bill that would partially compensate the Nutt family for the loss of assets due to the Union army.

According to Haller Nutt's listed property in 1860, he owned 42,947 acres and 800 slaves.

== Personal life ==
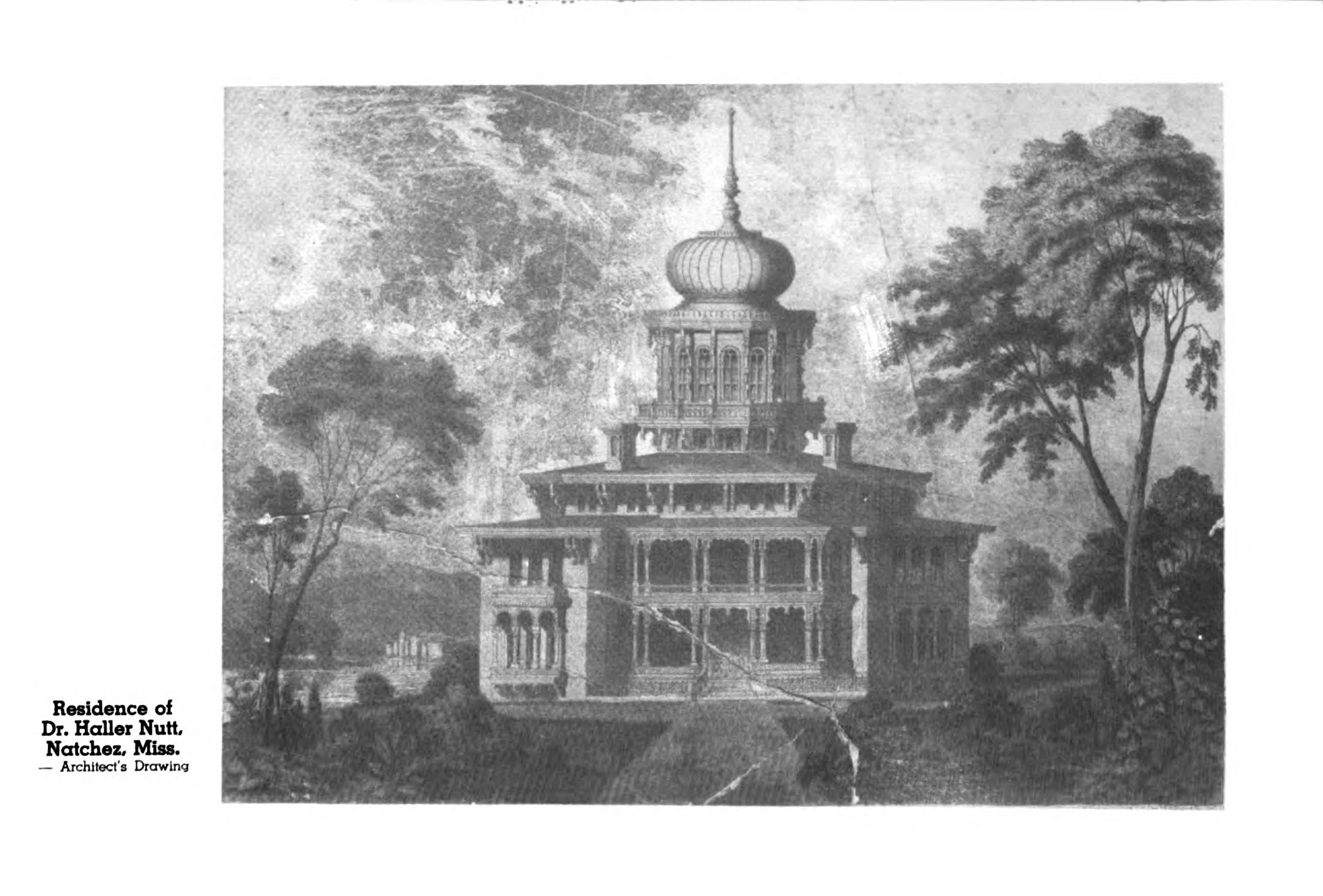
Longwood house

Nutt married Julia Augusta Williams, the daughter of Austin Williams and Caroline Routh Williams (of the Routh family), in 1840. She was eighteen at the time. They had eleven children:

- Caroline Routh Nutt (c. 1841–1842)
- Mary Ella Nutt (1844).
- Fanny Smith Nutt (1846).
- Haller Nutt Jr. (1848).
- John Ker Nutt (1850).
- Austin Nutt (1852).
- Sargeant Prentiss Nutt (1855).
- Julia Nutt (1857).
- Calvin Routh Nutt (1858).
- Lillie Nutt (1861).
- Rushworth Nutt (1863).

They decided to begin construction on Longwood in the spring of 1860. They hired Philadelphia architect Samuel Sloan to design the multistory octagonal in the Oriental Revival style. Construction of the exterior was completed by the beginning of the Civil War. With the threat of the Civil War looming, Sloan's artisans soon halted their construction, fearing for their safety, and fled back to the North. The basement story was completed by slave labor and was ready for occupancy by 1862. Longwood is the largest octagonal house in the United States.

== Death ==
Nutt died on June 15, 1864, of pneumonia. His family continued living at Longwood plantation after his death.
