= Choctaw Creek (Claiborne County, Mississippi) =

Stream in Mississippi, U.S.

Coordinates: 32.0204339°N 90.7323232°W

Choctaw Creek is a stream in the U.S. state of Mississippi. It is a tributary to Bayou Pierre.

Choctaw Creek is named after the Choctaw people.
