= Choctaw Creek (Copiah County, Mississippi) =

Stream in Mississippi, U.S.

Coordinates: 31.9498801°N 90.6045420°W

Choctaw Creek is a stream in the U.S. state of Mississippi. It is a tributary to Bayou Pierre.

Choctaw Creek is named after the Choctaw people.
