= Choctaw Creek (Harrison County, Mississippi) =

Stream in Mississippi, U.S.

Coordinates: 30.6154721°N 88.9872598°W

Choctaw Creek is a stream in the U.S. state of Mississippi. It is a tributary to Tuxachanie Creek.

Choctaw Creek is named after the Choctaw people.
