= Petit Gulf cotton =

Cultivar of Mexican origin

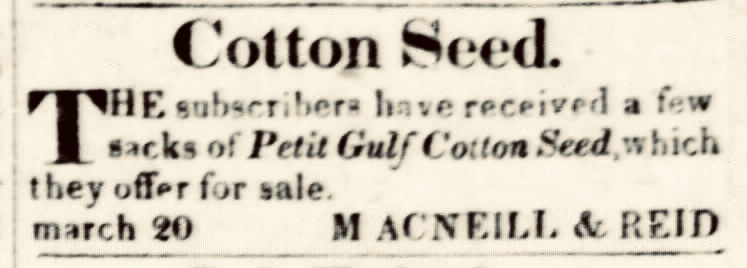
"Cotton Seed" Baton-Rouge Gazette, May 16, 1829

Cotton plant depicted in B. L. C. Wailes's 1854 book about Mississippi ecology, geology, and agriculture

Petit Gulf cotton was a cotton hybrid patented by planter Rush Nutt at his Laurel Hill Plantation in Rodney, Mississippi, in 1833. It was named "Petit Gulf" for the bend of the Mississippi River where it was grown. It proved more resistant than the green seed cotton from Georgia as long as planters followed the breeding process used in Rodney. Petit Gulf was said to be less likely to harbor diseases and rot than other breeds of cotton. Moreover, it was easier to pick with a human hand, thus leading to greater productivity.

There is a fair amount of lore associated with the Petit Gulf cotton strain. In 1853, T.A. of Washington, Mississippi wrote to the editor of the Natchez Courier, "a Mr. Lewellyn Price, then a planter in the Gulf hills, in Claiborne county, near where Oakland College stands, has the credit of first growing it to any extent. As Mr. Price never was fully certain of who first gave him the few seeds from which he, ultimately, grew his crop, it is only necessary to say that he began with three or four seeds which were given to him as Mexican. These he grew carefully, until he had enough to plant five acres. From this small beginning it spread, until now it has become the principal dependence for a crop through the entire cotton growing region." The version that appeared in a Natchez newspaper in 1871 said the seeds came from a visiting trader:

Now there happened about the year 1816 to be a trade carried on between the highlands of Mississippi and the prairies bordering on Mexico and Western Texas. The traders would carry over their money, buy up mustang ponies and drive them across to our border. One of these was in the habit of stopping at a plantation just back of Rodney, then called Petit Gulf. He formed a sort of attachment for his host. On one of these visits he brought him a small package of cotton seed...the yield was satisfactory; the bolls did not rot, and they opened as invitingly as a hospitable landlord; the picking was easy. Immediately their fame spread and they long went by the name of the Petit Gulf seed, though in reality they were Mexican. Many fortunes were made by Petit Gulf panters. The old black seed disappred gradually and the Mexican improved still holds sway.

According to one local historian, there are two legends about how Nutt acquired the seed: "The first is that he got the seed in Egypt while on a world cruise. The other is that he found it in Mexico and offered to buy some. Told that the country did not allow the export of cotton seed, he was offered an alternative by the resourceful Mexican. He told him that dolls could be exported—so Nutt bought a whole batch of dolls, all stuffed with cotton seed." Abother account credits Walter Burling for the Mexican-doll-seed smuggling.

In 1891, the Petit Gulf cultivar was described as "Stalk large and straggling. Wood limbs long and abundant near the bottom. Fruit limbs long, long jointed and drooping. Bolls medium and pointed. Staple long. Not prolific. Late."

By 1907, an agronomist reported that "...for many years pure seed has been impossible to obtain and the variety has practically disappeared from cultivation, the cotton still grown and reported under this name being a mixture of various types. Petit Gulf was developed about 1840 by Col. H. W. Vick, of Mississippi, and by 1846 it had become very popular."

The Hunt strain may have been derivative of Petit Gulf.

Rush Nutt's son Haller Nutt—also a wealthy enslaver, planter, and agronomist—developed and marketed a cotton cultivar known as Egypto-Mexican beginning in 1841.
