= James Cessor =

Mississippi politician

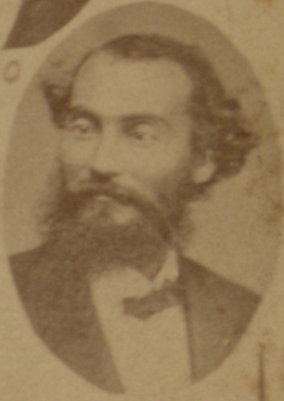
James D. Cessor

James D. Cessor was an American saddle and harness maker, state legislator, and public official in Mississippi. He represented Jefferson County, Mississippi in the Mississippi House of Representatives from 1871 to 1877.

He was of mixed heritage and born free in Mississippi. He was among the small number of free African Americans in Mississippi before the American Civil War. In 1869, he was appointed a marshal and to the Board of Alderman in Rodney, Mississippi. He served in the Mississippi House of Representatives from 1872 to 1877.

In 1875 he was appointed an inspector of the state penitentiary.

== See also ==
- African American officeholders from the end of the Civil War until before 1900
