= Longwood (Natchez, Mississippi) =

Historic house in Mississippi, United States

- U.S. National Register of Historic Places
- U.S. National Historic Landmark
- Mississippi Landmark
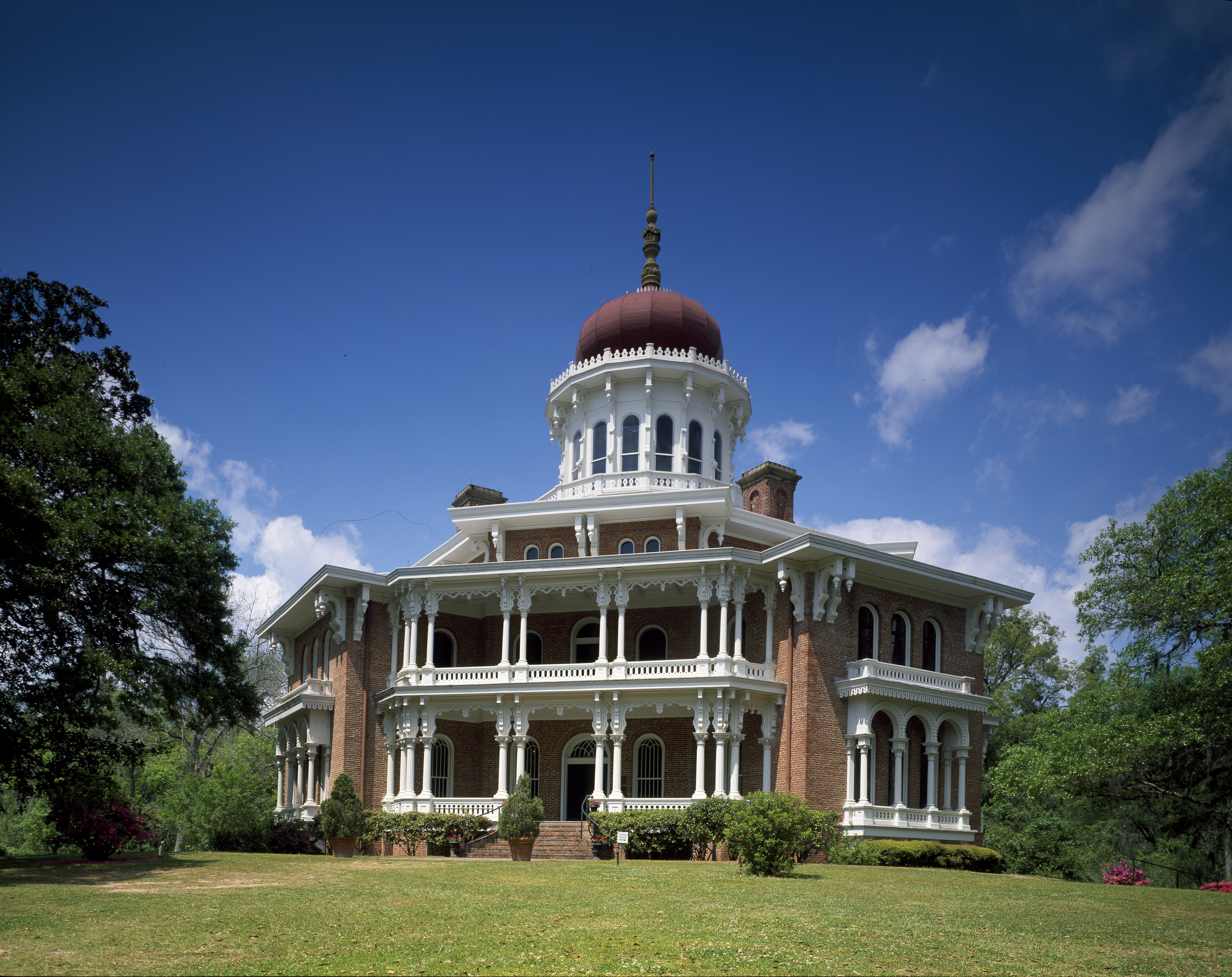

- Location within Mississippi Location within the United States
- Interactive map showing the location of Longwood
- Location: 140 Lower Woodville Road, Natchez, Mississippi
- Coordinates: 31°32′12″N 91°24′17″W
- Built: 1859-ca. 1864
- Architect: Samuel Sloan
- Architectural style: Octagon Mode, Italian Villa
- NRHP reference No.: 69000079
- USMS No.: 001-NAT-4016-NHL-ML

Significant dates
- Added to NRHP: December 16, 1969
- Designated NHL: December 16, 1969
- Designated USMS: November 29, 1994

Longwood, also known as Nutt's Folly, is a historic antebellum octagonal mansion located at 140 Lower Woodville Road in Natchez, Mississippi, United States. Built in part by enslaved people, the mansion is on the U.S. National Register of Historic Places, and is a National Historic Landmark. Longwood is the largest octagonal house in the United States.

== Description and history ==
The mansion is known for its octagonal plan, byzantine onion-shaped dome, and the contrast between its ornately finished first floor and the unfinished upper floors.

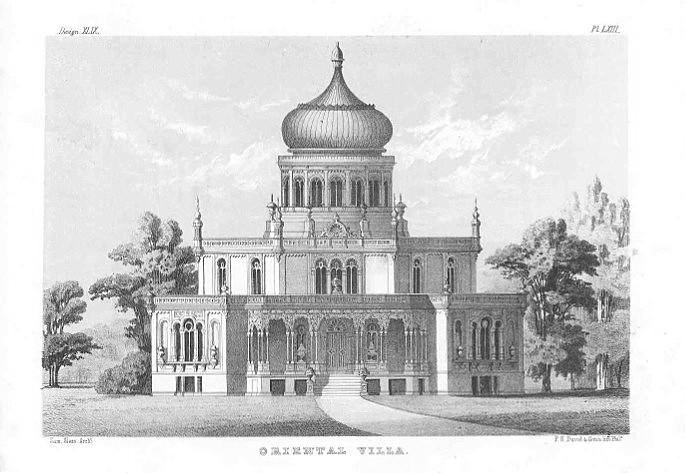
The inspiration for Longwood: Sloan's "Oriental Villa" as it appeared in his 1852 book, The Model Architect

Samuel Sloan, a Philadelphia architect, designed the home in 1859 for cotton planter Haller Nutt. Work was halted in 1861 at the start of the American Civil War when the craftsmen employed on the project, who were from Pennsylvania, abruptly left to join the Union army. Of the 32 rooms planned for the house, only nine rooms on the basement floor were completed. The basement was originally planned to have a wine cellar, school room, recreation room, and office, but were converted to living quarters by Nutt and a few local workers. Nutt died of pneumonia in 1864, leaving the work incomplete.

Haller Nutt's never-finished Natchez home, Longwood, was the last burst of Southern opulence before war and the abolition of slavery brought the cotton barons' dominance to an end. On July 4, 1867, the Freedmen's Picnic was held on the grounds of Longwood, which was attended by more than 9,000 former slaves. Longwood survived decades of neglect and near-abandonment to become one of Natchez' most popular attractions. In 1968, Nutt's grandchildren sold the home to an investor, who donated as a historic house museum to the Pilgrimage Garden Club with the conditions that it could never be finished.

Today, Longwood is operated year-round as a museum; it is also available for rent.

== In popular culture ==
Longwood was featured in the Southern United States segment of Guide to Historic Homes of America, an in-depth production by Bob Vila for the A&E Network.

In 2010, Longwood was used in the HBO series True Blood, for the external shots of the fictional Jackson, Mississippi, mansion of Russell Edgington, the Vampire King of Mississippi and Louisiana.

== See also ==
- List of National Historic Landmarks in Mississippi
- National Register of Historic Places listings in Adams County, Mississippi
