= Tuxachanie Creek =

Stream in Mississippi, United States

Coordinates: 30.4879750°N 88.8866975°W

Tuxachanie Creek is a stream in the U.S. state of Mississippi.

Tuxachanie is a name derived from the Choctaw language meaning "fragments of hominy-boiling pots are lying there".
