= Grand Gulf, Mississippi =

Extinct settlement

- Ghost town
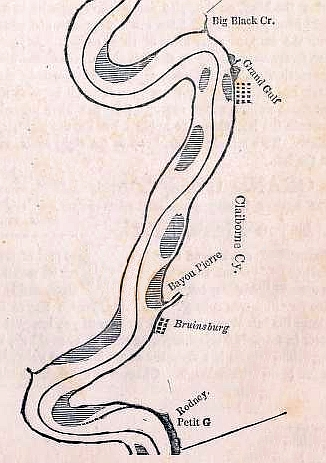
- 1840 map of Mississippi River showing Grand Gulf, Bruinsburg, and Rodney

- Location of Grand Gulf Grand Gulf (the United States)
- Coordinates: 32°02′00″N 91°03′09″W
- Country: United States
- State: Mississippi
- County: Claiborne
- Elevation: 95 ft (29 m)
- Time zone: UTC-6 (Central (CST))
  - Summer (DST): UTC-5 (CDT)
- GNIS feature ID: 670578

Grand Gulf is a ghost town in Claiborne County, Mississippi, United States. Before the American Civil War, "its wharves were crowded with cotton from Copiah, Hinds, and Claiborne counties."

== History ==
Grand Gulf was named for the large whirlpool, (or gulf), formed by the Mississippi River flowing against a large rocky bluff. La Salle and Zadok Cramer commented on the dangers caused by the eddies at Grand Gulf. The British and Spanish created settlements in the area and it continued to grow after the land became part of the United States. According to the Clarion-Ledger newspaper, "Of the three towns [in Claiborne County] mentioned as existing prior to 1829, Grand Gulf, eight miles northwest of Port Gibson, was by far the most prosperous. With several schools, two large hotels, two weekly newspapers, this flourshing town came very near being chosen as the county seat. By reason of its location on the Mississippi River, it was a commercial point of great importance. Old records show that from Sept. 1, 1834 to May 19, 1835, a period of less than nine months, it shipped 47,770 bales of cotton...The town was twice destroyed by fire and twice rebuilt."

The community of Grand Gulf was incorporated in 1833.

Cotton from Copiah, Hinds, and Claiborne counties was shipped on the Mississippi River from Grand Gulf, and the town served as the shipping point for Port Gibson, which was located further inland. By 1835, Grand Gulf handled more cotton than any other city in Mississippi except Natchez and Vicksburg. A railroad was built to connect Grand Gulf to Port Gibson.

By 1854, Grand Gulf was home to almost 1,000 citizens, had two churches, a town hall, a hospital, theater, cotton press, saw mill, and grist mill.

Grand Gulf was devastated by multiple yellow fever epidemics, which were reported across the country at Pittsfield, Massachusetts. The epidemics traveled with passengers and workers on the riverboats, repeatedly recurring through the nineteenth century.

A newspaper, The Grand Gulf Advertiser, was published in Grand Gulf.

A post office operated under the name Grand Gulf for more than 100 years, from 1829 to 1932.

=== Civil War ===
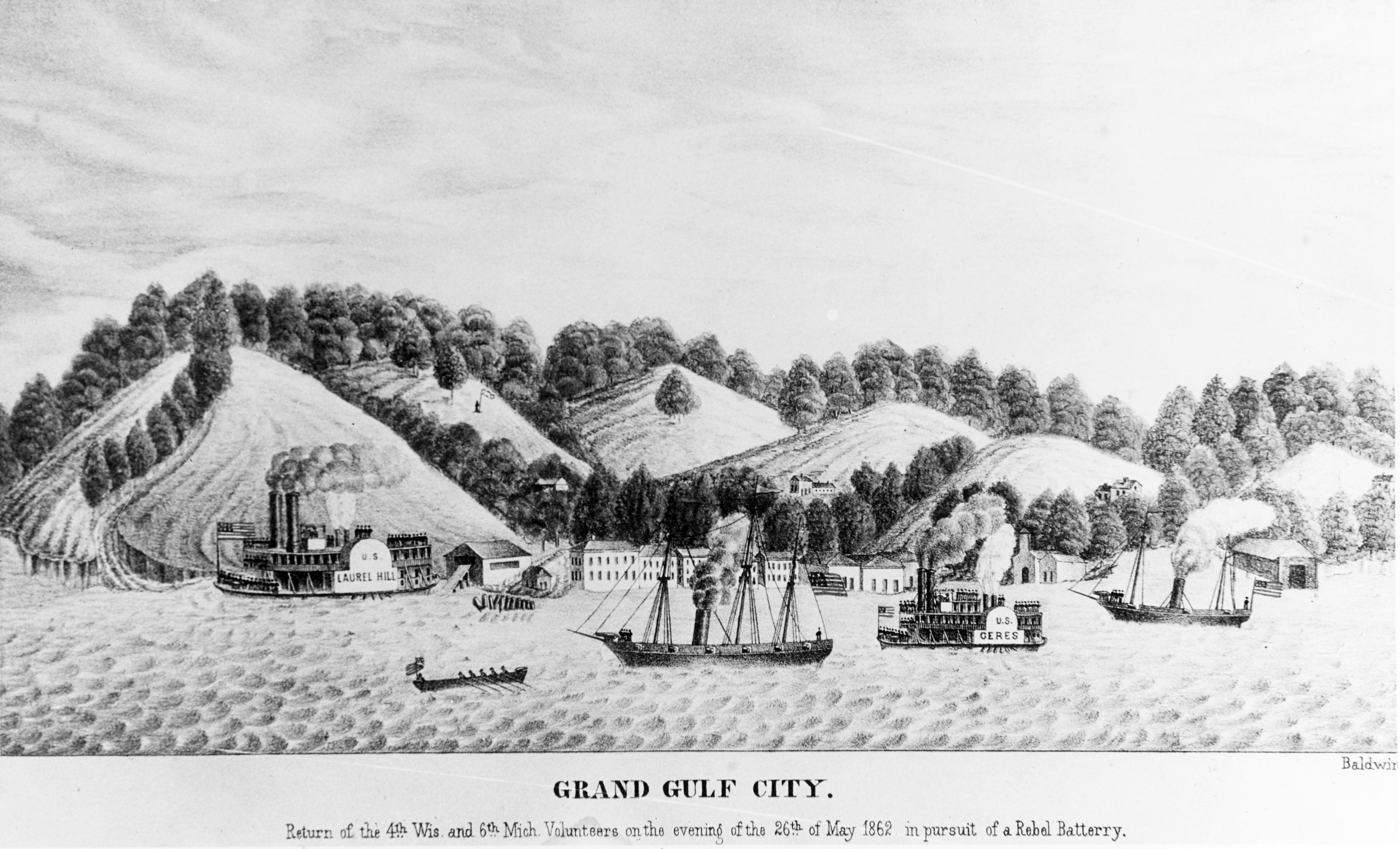
Lithograph of Union forces in pursuit of Confederate forces at Grand Gulf on May 26, 1862

During the American Civil War, Grand Gulf was the site of multiple encounters. In 1862, Admiral David Farragut attempted to take a fleet of Union gunboats upriver past Grand Gulf to attack Vicksburg. He was harassed by guerillas shooting from Grand Gulf, which caused General Thomas Williams to attempt to burn the town. Local residents convinced him that the gunfire did not come from citizens and the town was temporarily spared. A few weeks later, however, the town was burned by Union forces, after they learned that the Confederates were placing artillery in the village. According to the diary of a Union soldier who visited in May 1863, "nothing 'but cisterns and chimneys' remained to mark what once was a town."

During Ulysses S. Grant's Vicksburg Campaign, Confederate forces repelled his invasion fleet during the Battle of Grand Gulf. They did not let his forces pass north on the Mississippi River. Grant took his forces south to Bruinsburg, fought the Battle of Port Gibson, and marched overland to take Vicksburg.

=== Decline ===
After the Civil War, Grand Gulf's population continued to decline. The Mississippi River slowly shifted westward and the town soon became landlocked. By 1900, Grand Gulf had a population of 150. By 1937 it was "not much more than a name."

== Today ==
The Grand Gulf Military State Park contains a museum with artifacts from the battle and multiple interpretive exhibits, along with the earth works from Forts Wade and Cobun.

Grand Gulf is the location of the Grand Gulf Nuclear Station. After an upgrade in 2012, it is the largest single-unit nuclear power plant in the country and fifth largest in the world.

The Grand Gulf Mound, an Early Marksville culture archaeological site, is located near Grand Gulf.

== Notable residents ==
- Ephraim G. Peyton, judge
- James Monroe Trotter, the first African-American promoted to lieutenant in the US Army during the American Civil War, and first to be hired by the U.S. Postal Service; he was appointed in 1886 as federal Recorder of Deeds in Washington, D.C.

== See also ==
- Petit Gulf
