= Grand Gulf Military State Park =

- U.S. National Register of Historic Places
- Mississippi Landmark
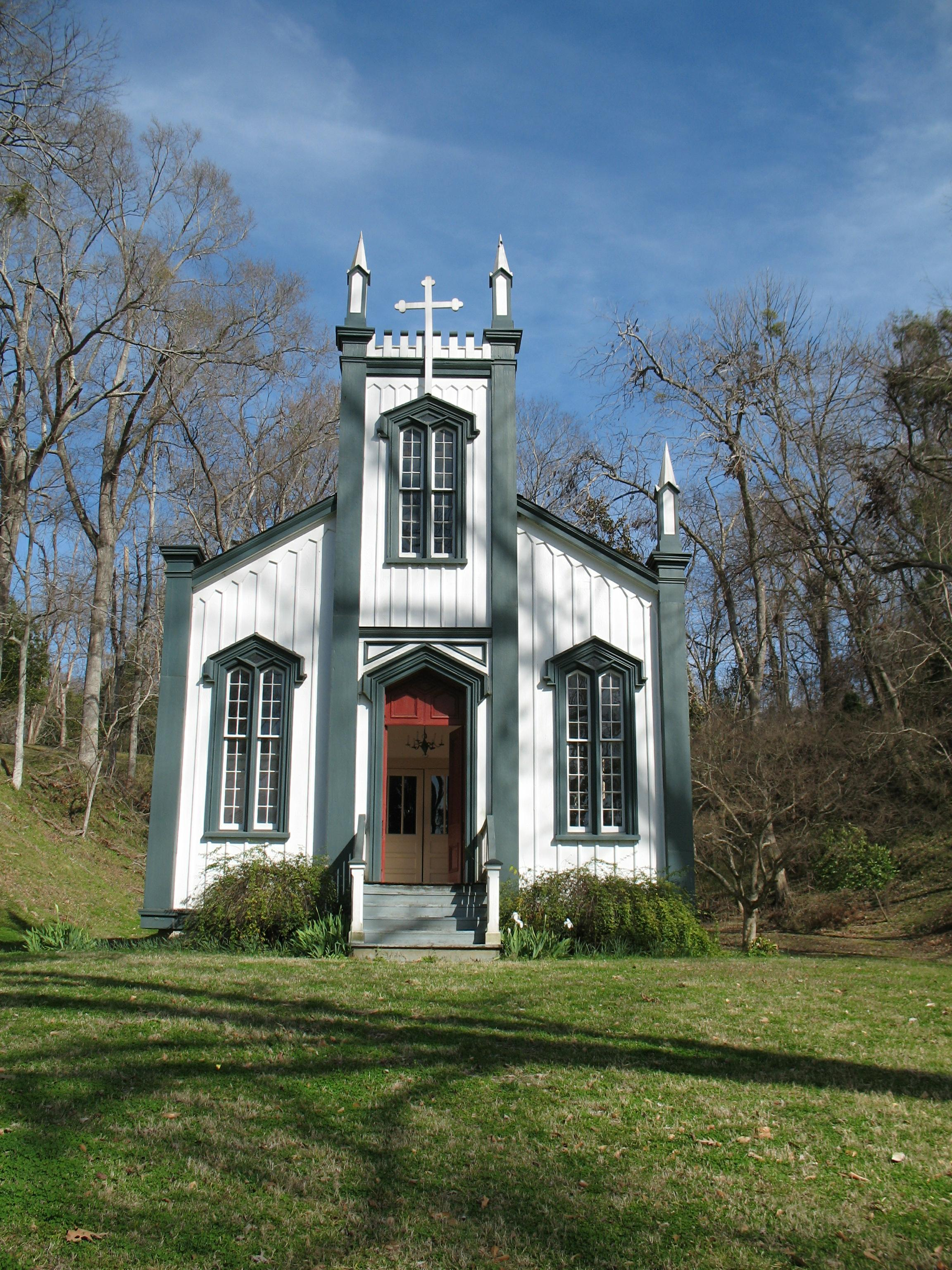
- Confederate Memorial Chapel, built in 1868, was moved to Grand Gulf Military State Park from Rodney, Mississippi in 1983.

- Location within Mississippi Location within the United States
- Nearest city: Port Gibson
- Coordinates: 32°01′49″N 91°03′12″W
- Area: 400 acres (160 ha)
- NRHP reference No.: 72000689
- USMS No.: 021-GGF-0100-NR-ML

Significant dates
- Added to NRHP: April 11, 1972
- Designated USMS: September 28, 1987

Grand Gulf Military State Park is a Mississippi state park located 10 miles northwest of Port Gibson in an unincorporated area, now the ghost town of Grand Gulf, in Claiborne County, Mississippi. The park includes the remnants of two batteries that fired on and repelled Ulysses S. Grant's forces during the Battle of Grand Gulf. After the Battle of Port Gibson, Grant made Grand Gulf his base of operations. It is listed on the National Register of Historic Places and is a Mississippi Landmark.

The 400-acre landmark includes Fort Cobun and Fort Wade earthworks, the Grand Gulf Cemetery, a museum, campgrounds, picnic facilities, hiking trails, an observation tower, and restored buildings.

The town of Grand Gulf was originally a port on the Mississippi River. However, after being burned during the American Civil War and a shift in the flow of the Mississippi River, the community became a ghost town.

== Gallery ==
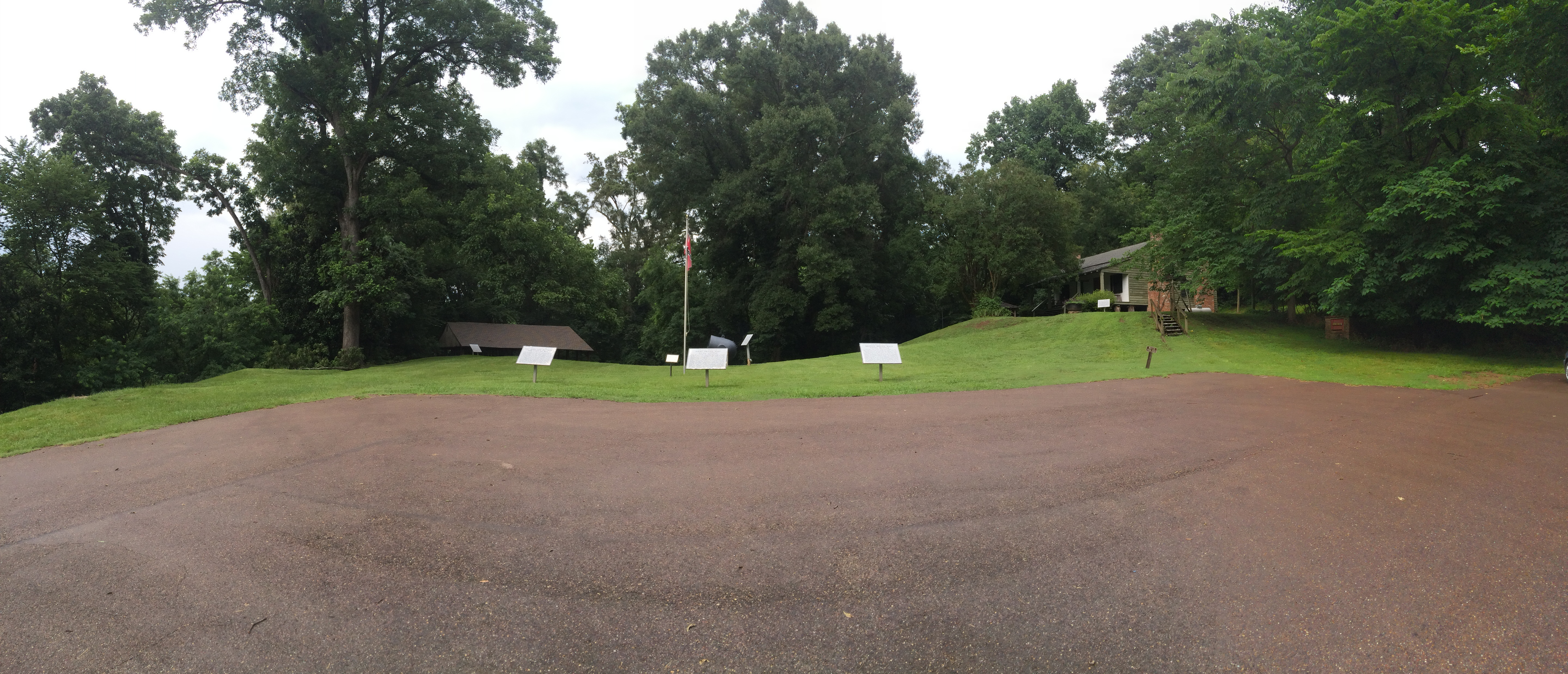
Overview of the Fort Wade earth works.

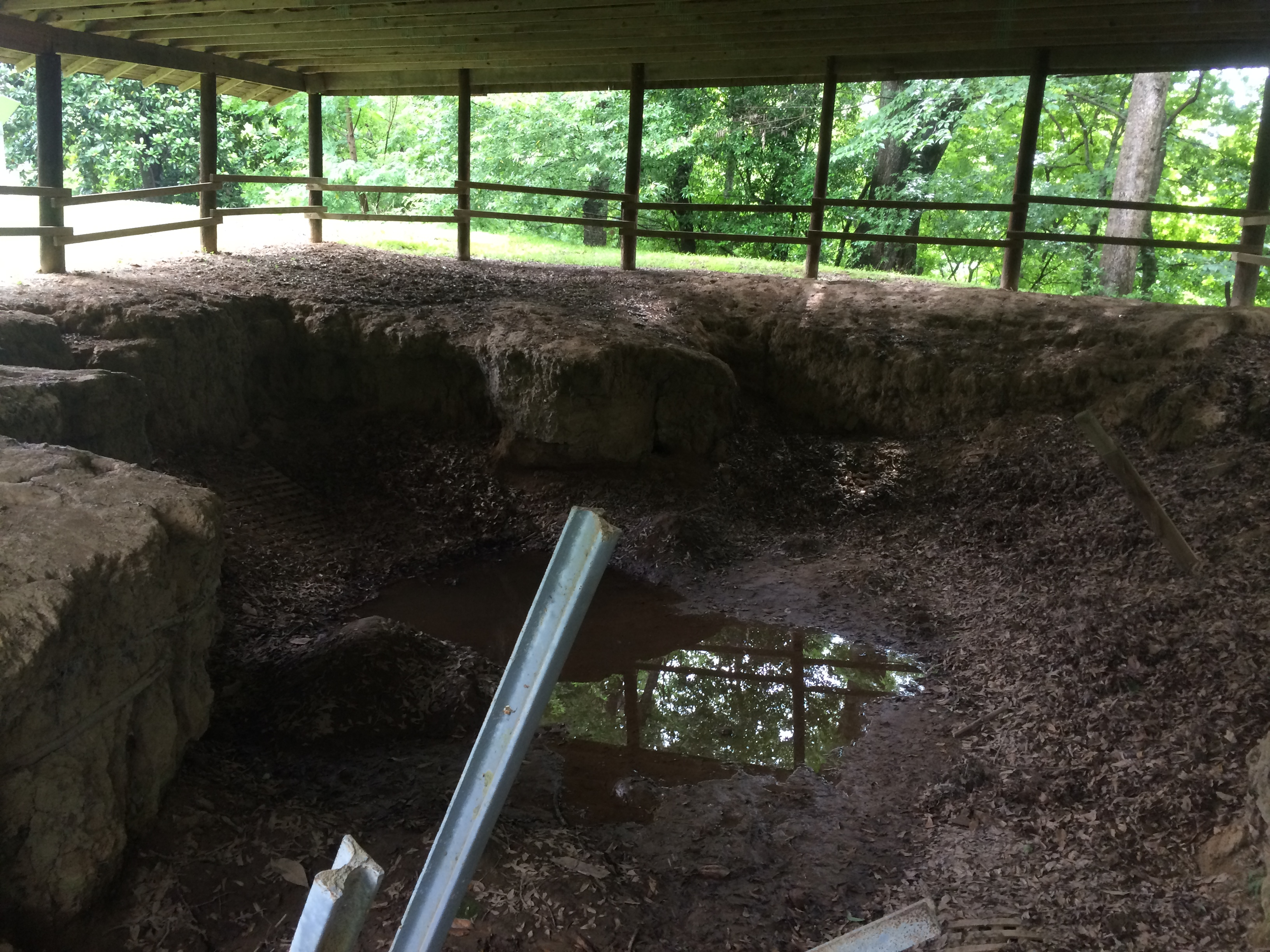
Ammunition magazine at Fort Wade. The magazine was excavated in the late 1970s.

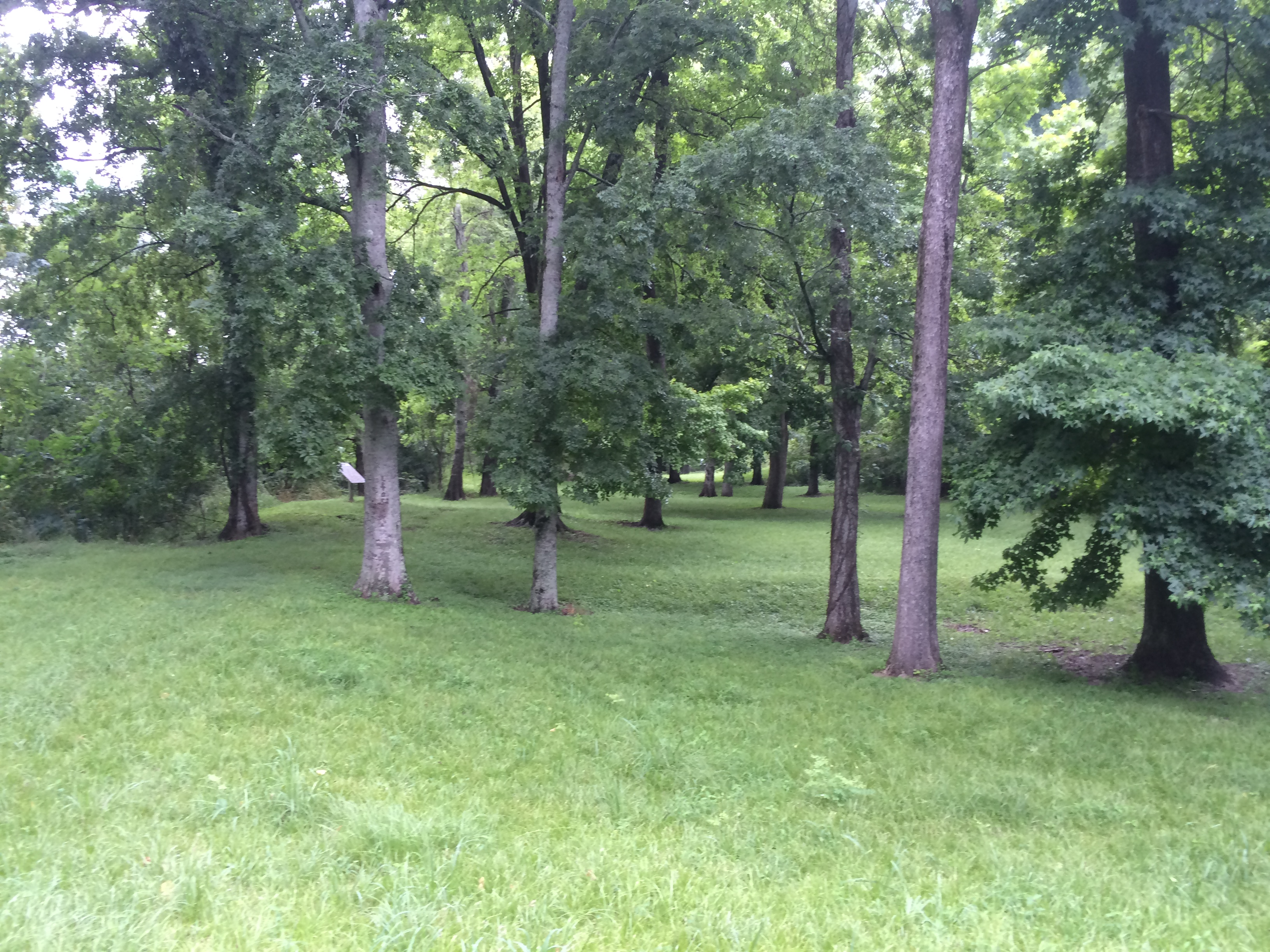
Remaining earth works of Fort Cobun.

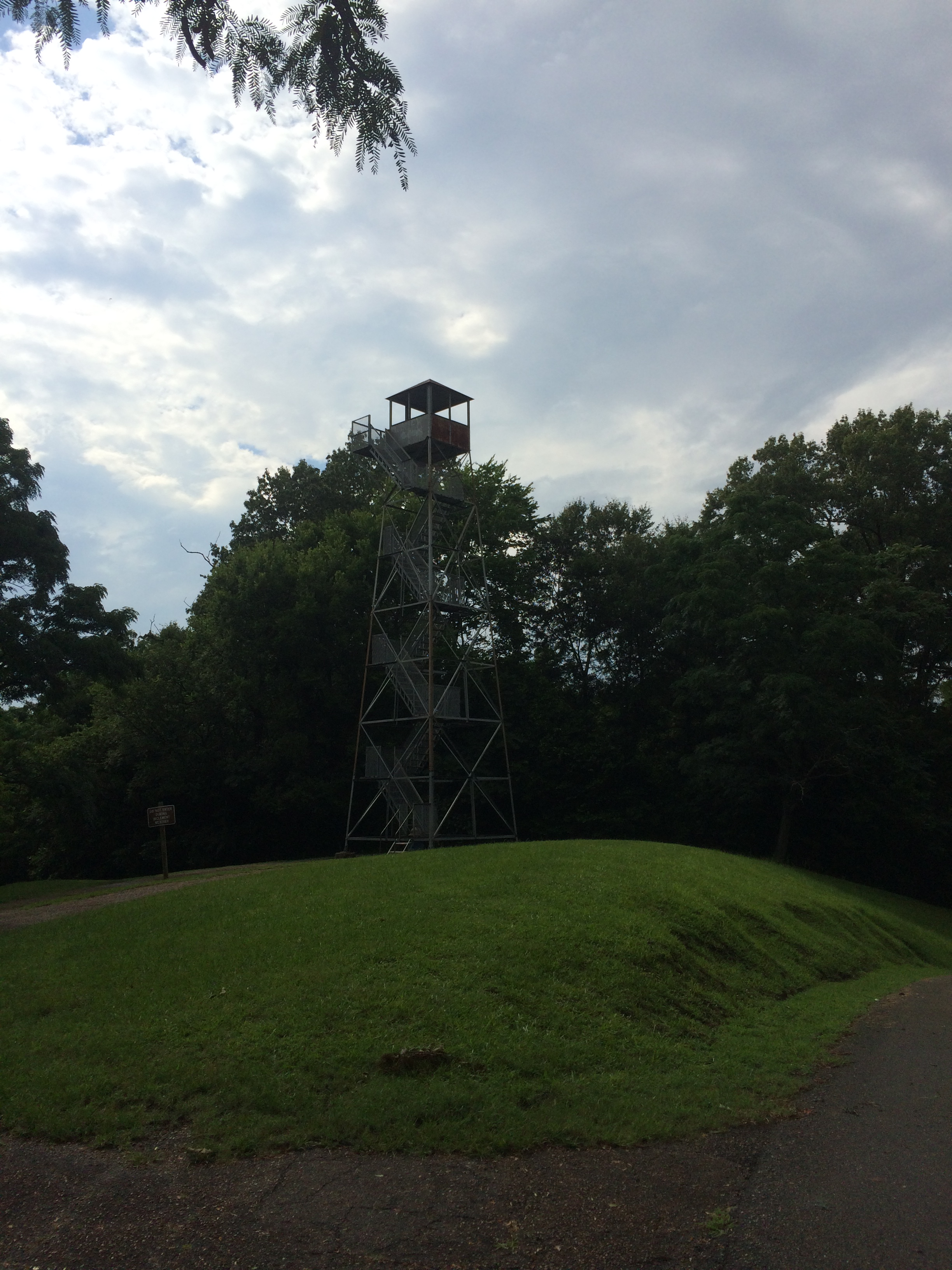
Observation tower at Grand Gulf Military Park
