= Petit Gulf =

Location on lower Mississippi River

Coordinates: 31.906°N 91.212°W

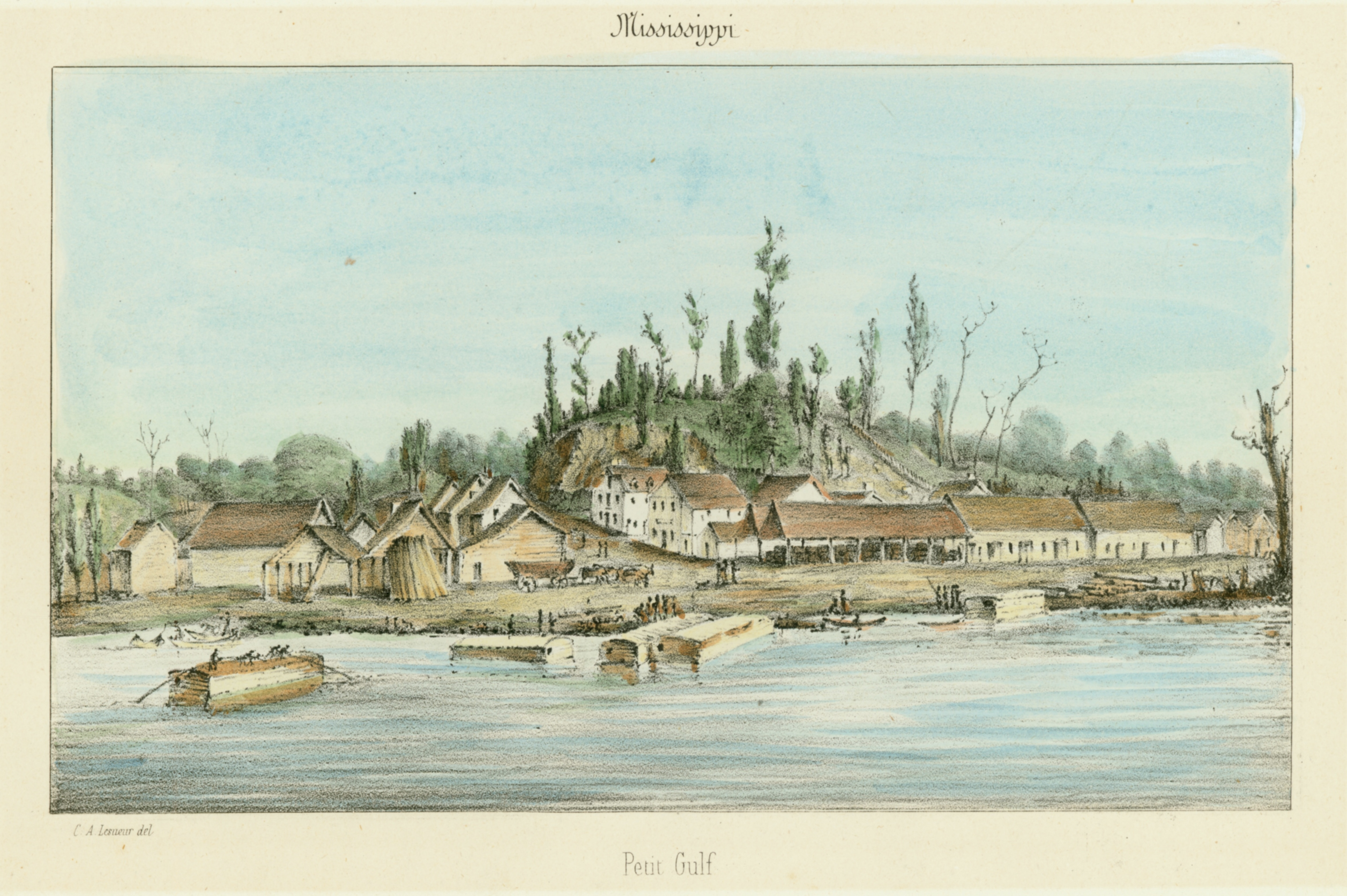
Hand-colored lithograph by Charles Alexandre Lesueur showing boats, painted at Petit Gulf sometime between 1825 and 1837

Petit Gulf was a location on the Mississippi River in North America. The gulf was an eddy or whirlpool that was smaller than the nearby Grand Gulf. The eddy lent its name to the nearby Petit Gulf Hills and Petit Gulf Creek. There was a settlement there prior to the 1828 organization of Rodney, Mississippi, and the Petit Gulf cotton cultivar, which was widely planted in the U.S. South before the American Civil War, was named for the landing and town.

== Geography ==
As described by The Western Pilot in 1847, "Here the river makes a short turn again to the right, occasioned by a bluff in the bend, on the left. There is an eddy under the point, on the right. Channel nearest the left shore." The town of Rodney was "situated below and along side of the bluffs at the Petit Gulf."

According to the U.S. Army Corps of Engineers, "Removed from the main channel of the Lower Mississippi were a troublesome old bendway and the small town of Rodney, Mississippi. Rodney had been established at the foot of what had been called 'the Petit Gulf Hills.' The bluff's name referred to a small but dangerous eddy that early travelers found in the river in front of it. There had been some British land grants in the area, and a few Spanish ones later, but the town was established by American settlers." The U.S. Army Corps of Engineers created the Rodney Cutoff at the site beginning in 1935.

Petit Gulf Creek, described as a "tiny" stream, ran nearby. The country surrounding the village was known as the Petit Gulf Hills.

== History ==
Historians speculate that Petit Gulf was used as a river crossing point by indigenous Americans, before it came to be known as Petit Gulph, and then Petit Gulf, and finally Rodney. The east–west crossing was apparently easiest at Petit Gulf compared to any other point nearby along the river. The equivalent Louisiana landing was St. Joseph, and skiff boatmen took passengers across.

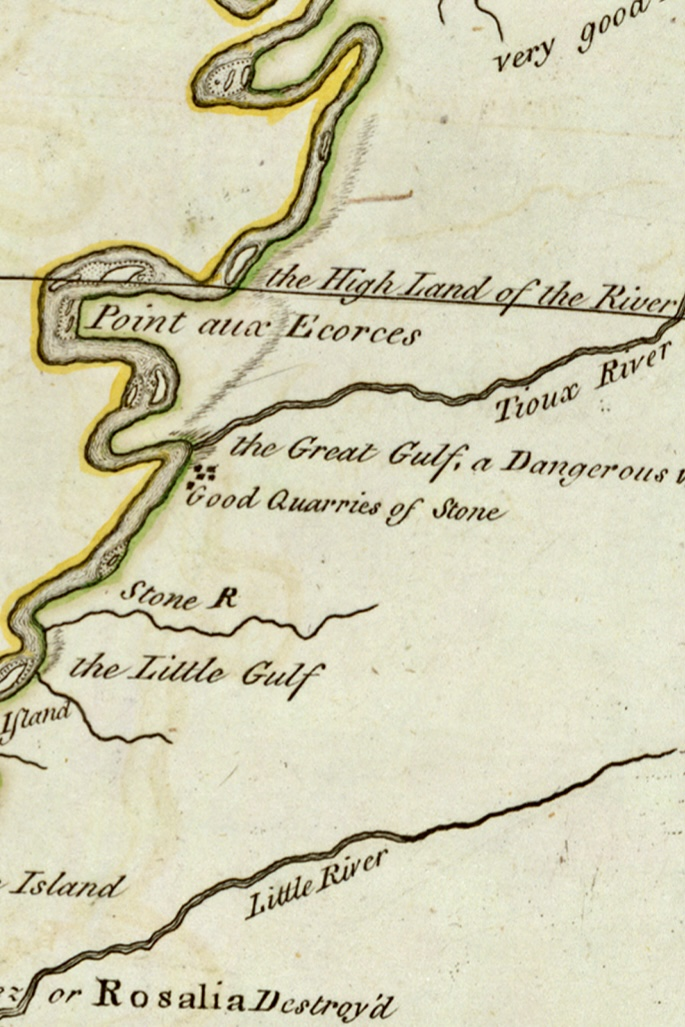
The great and little gulfs of the lower Mississippi, mapped 1775

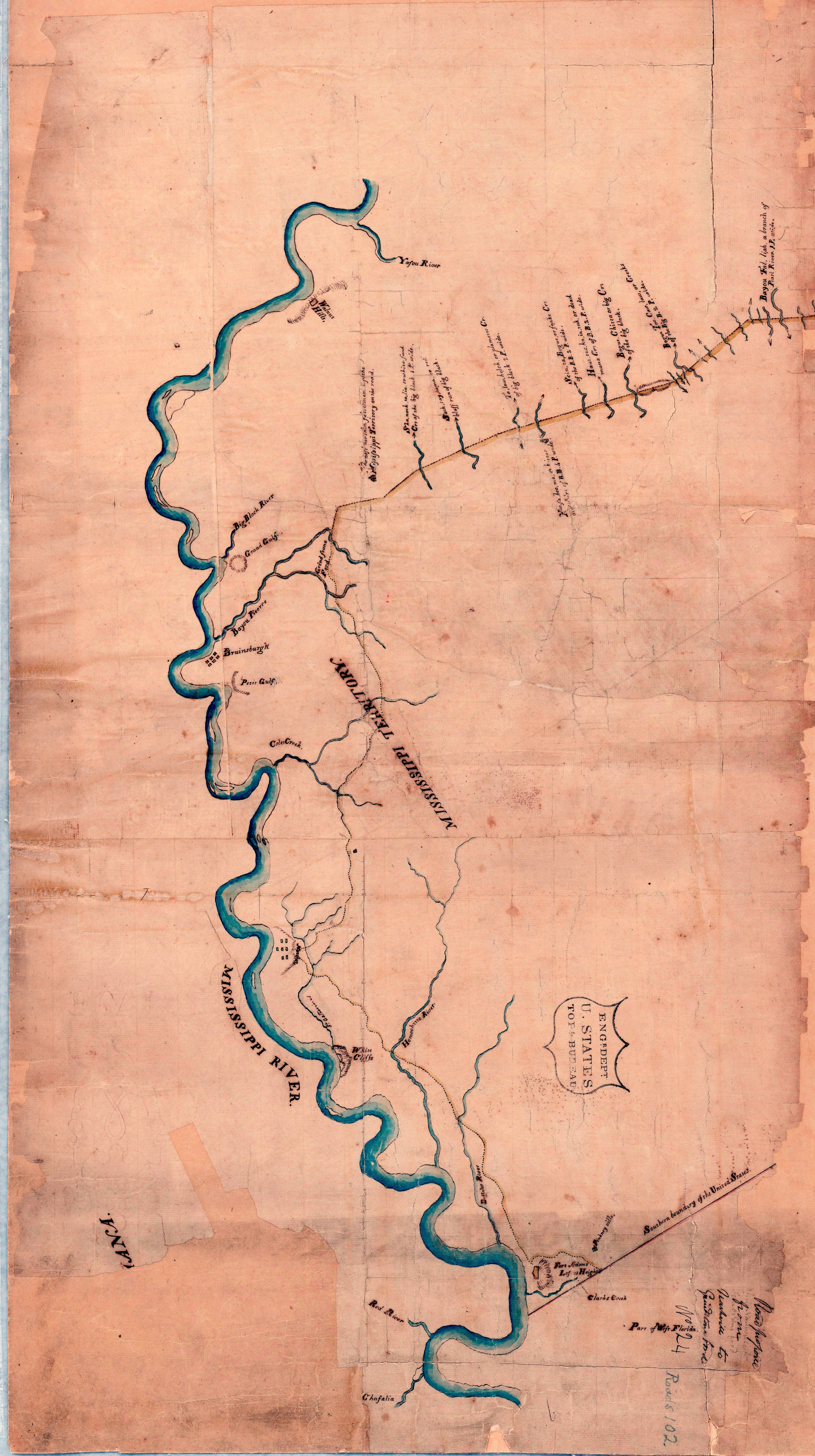
Petit Gulf was one of the major settlements and landmarks of the Natchez District on James Wilkinson's survey of the Natchez Trace, made consequent to the Treaty of Fort Adams, about 1802

A French traveler described the spot in 1700, "We left the Natchez and coasted along to the right, where the river is bordered with high gravelly banks for a distance of twelve leagues; at the extremity of these bluffs is a place we called Petit Gulf, on account of the whirlpool formed by the river for the distance of a quarter of a league." The name Petit Gulph appears on maps as early as 1715. Travelers of 1739 described Petit Gulf's dangerous waters: "Here...we encountered for a quarter of a league extremely violent currents," and three of their eight boats ran aground on a midstream island and had to be rescued "by the efforts of a boatload of negroes which we had dispatched to their assistance." A 500-acre land grant was issued to John Campbell in 1772 "above Fort Panmure...at a place known by the name of the Little Gulph." A settler of 1774 called it Petit Gouffre and called Bayou Pierre the Stony River, recording in his journal "From Fort Rosalie to Petit Gouffre is ten and a half leagues. There is firm rock on the east side of the Mississippi for near a mile. The land near the river is high, very broken, very rich, and several plantations have been opened. From Petit Gouffre to Stoney river is a league and a half." The first white settler, a Mr. Campbell, arrived in 1798. The first business or shop was reportedly opened in 1800. The landing played a role in the Aaron Burr conspiracy trial; a soldier testified he saw guns being loaded onto Burr's own boat at Petit Gulf.

The town of Petit Gulf was organized in 1814. A traveler from Wilmington, Ohio who passed through in 1825 and recorded in his journal, "The next morning we passed the Walnut Hills, a fine elevated bluff, gradually rising for several hundred feet, with fine cultivated farms, and extending for near two miles on the river. This is a cultivated country, and amply compensates for the immense swamps and the Spanish moss from which the traveller emerges. From the Walnut Hills to Natchez, you pass a great many fine farms, especially upon Grand and Petit Gulfs." Petit Gulf got a street survey in 1826, and was shipping cotton, deer skins, and beeswax down to New Orleans via flatboat. In 1828, Petit Gulf was renamed Rodney by act of the Mississippi state legislature. The boundaries of the town were set as a mile square, beginning where Magnolia Street met the Mississippi River.

The Petit Gulf cotton strain was named for the location. The desirable cultivar, originally from Mexico, was easier to harvest and produced a good lint.

== See also ==
- Grand Gulf, Mississippi

== Sources ==
- Claiborne, John Francis Hamtramck; Lagrone, C. M. (1880). Mississippi, as a province, territory and state, with biographical notices of eminent citizens. Vol. I. Jackson, Mississippi: Power & Barksdale.
- Jefferson County (PDF). Source Material for Mississippi History, Volume XXXII, Part I. WPA Statewide Historical Research Project. 1938 – via mlc.lib.ms.us.
