= Bayou Pierre (Mississippi) =

River in the United States

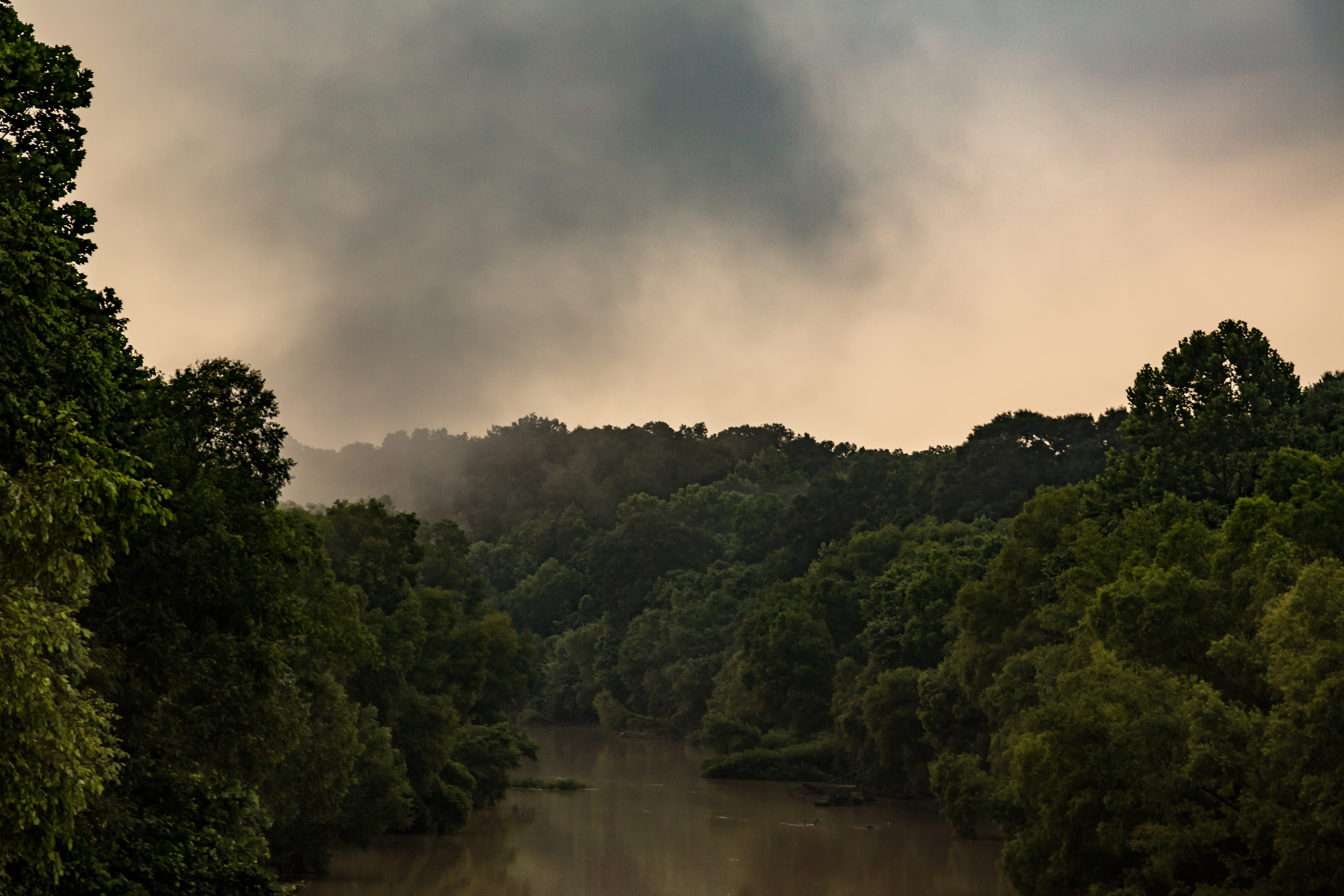
- Bayou Pierre from the Natchez Trace Parkway

Physical characteristics
- Mouth
  - coordinates: 31.913785°N 91.191662°W
- Discharge
  - location: Lake End, LA
  - average: 757 cu/ft. per sec.

Basin features
- River system: Mississippi River

Bayou Pierre is a river in Louisiana and Mississippi, United States. It is a tributary of the Mississippi River merging just downstream from the town of St. Joseph, Louisiana on the opposite bank. The river was named during the French colonial period but locals, going back to the 18th century, pronounce it like "bio pear," rhyming bayou "with now."

== Geography and location ==
Bayou Pierre is the location of the present-day city of Port Gibson, Mississippi. It was the site many of the earliest Protestant settlers disembarked the Mississippi River. Located about 30 miles north of Natchez, the towns were connected by the first road built in the Mississippi territory, the Natchez Trace, in 1801–02. Settlers floated the Tennessee, Ohio, and Mississippi rivers in the early 1800s to get to the new territory because there were no roads except this short section of the Natchez trace.

== History ==
Before there was Bruinsburg, there was what was known as the Bayou Pierre settlement. According to Mann Butler, drawing from the account of British West Florida colonist Calvin Smith, there were a total of six white families in the Petit Gulf and Bayou Pierre settlements in 1776. In the 1770s Anthony Hutchins wrote back east that that there was a blacksmith shop at Bayou Pierre, the only one in the vicinity outside. While advertising his plantation and sawmill for lease in 1802, Bruin stated that there had been a grist mill, apparently seated on the James' Run right-hand tributary, built "about thirty years ago, which stood many years...but was burned down by the Indians, and not since rebuilt." Bruin added that James' Run was "settled by some families toward its source, in large cane breaks".

== See also ==
- Bruinsburg
- Grindstone Ford

== Sources ==
- Butler, Mann (September 1838). "An Historical Sketch of the Natchez, or District of Natchez in the State of Mississippi, from 1763 to 1798". The Western Messenger, Devoted to Religion and Literature. Vol. V, no. 6. Western Unitarian Association. pp. 384–392.
