= David Hunt (planter) =

Mississippi plantation owner (1779–1861)

- Born: October 22, 1779 near Trenton, New Jersey
- Died: May 18, 1861 (aged 81); Jefferson County, Mississippi
- Resting place: Calviton Plantation cemetery near Rodney, Mississippi
- Occupations: Planter, philanthropist
- Spouse(s): Margaret (Stampley) Hunt; Mary (Calvit) Hunt; Ann (Ferguson) Hunt
- Relatives: Abijah Hunt (uncle)

David Hunt (October 22, 1779 – May 18, 1861) was an American planter based in the Natchez District of Mississippi. From New Jersey in approximately 1800, he took a job in his uncle Abijah Hunt's Mississippi business. After his uncle's untimely 1811 death, as a beneficiary and as the executor of the estate, he began to convert the estate into his plantation empire. By the time of the 1860 slave census, Hunt owned over 500 enslaved Africans. Had he not given approximately 500 enslaved Africans to his children, he would have had over 1,000. He gave each of his five adult children at least one plantation and about 100 slaves. In fact, Hunt and his five adult children and their spouses owned some 1,700 slaves by 1860.

Known as "King David," Hunt made a fortune in cotton production and sales. He was one of twelve millionaires residing near Natchez, Mississippi, at a time when there only were 35 millionaires in the entire United States. He became a major philanthropist in the South, contributing to educational institutions in Mississippi, as well as the American Colonization Society and Mississippi Colonization Society, the latter of which he was a founding member.

== Biography ==
=== Early life in New Jersey ===
David Hunt was born on October 22, 1779, on a farm near Ringoes, New Jersey. It was west and in the country compared to the capital of Trenton, New Jersey. He had a brother, Andrew Hunt, and several half siblings from his father Jonathan's second marriage. They were descendants of Ralph Hunt the line being Ralph, Edward, Jonathan, Jonathan, Jonathan.

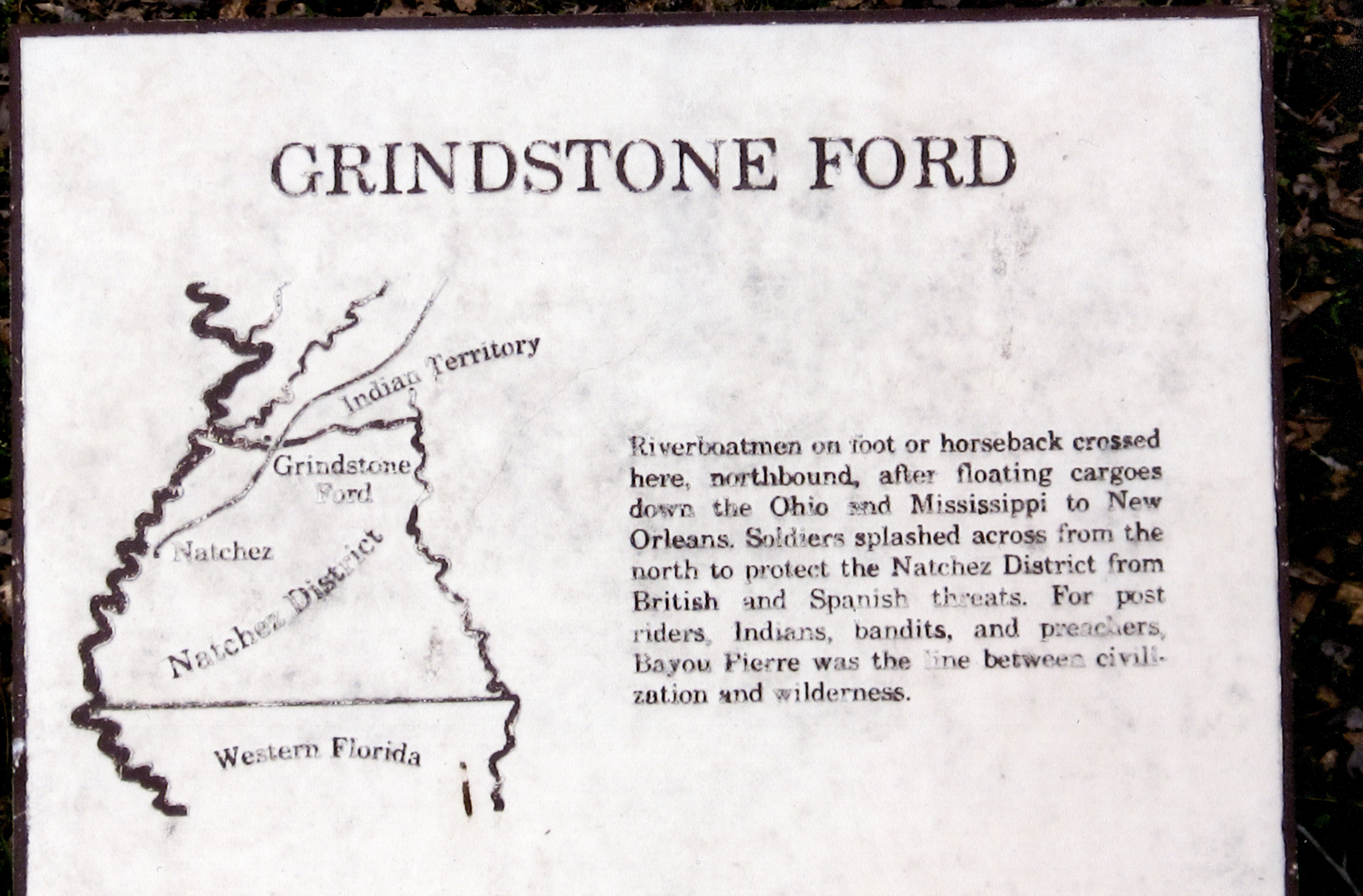
Sign along the Natchez Trace Parkway

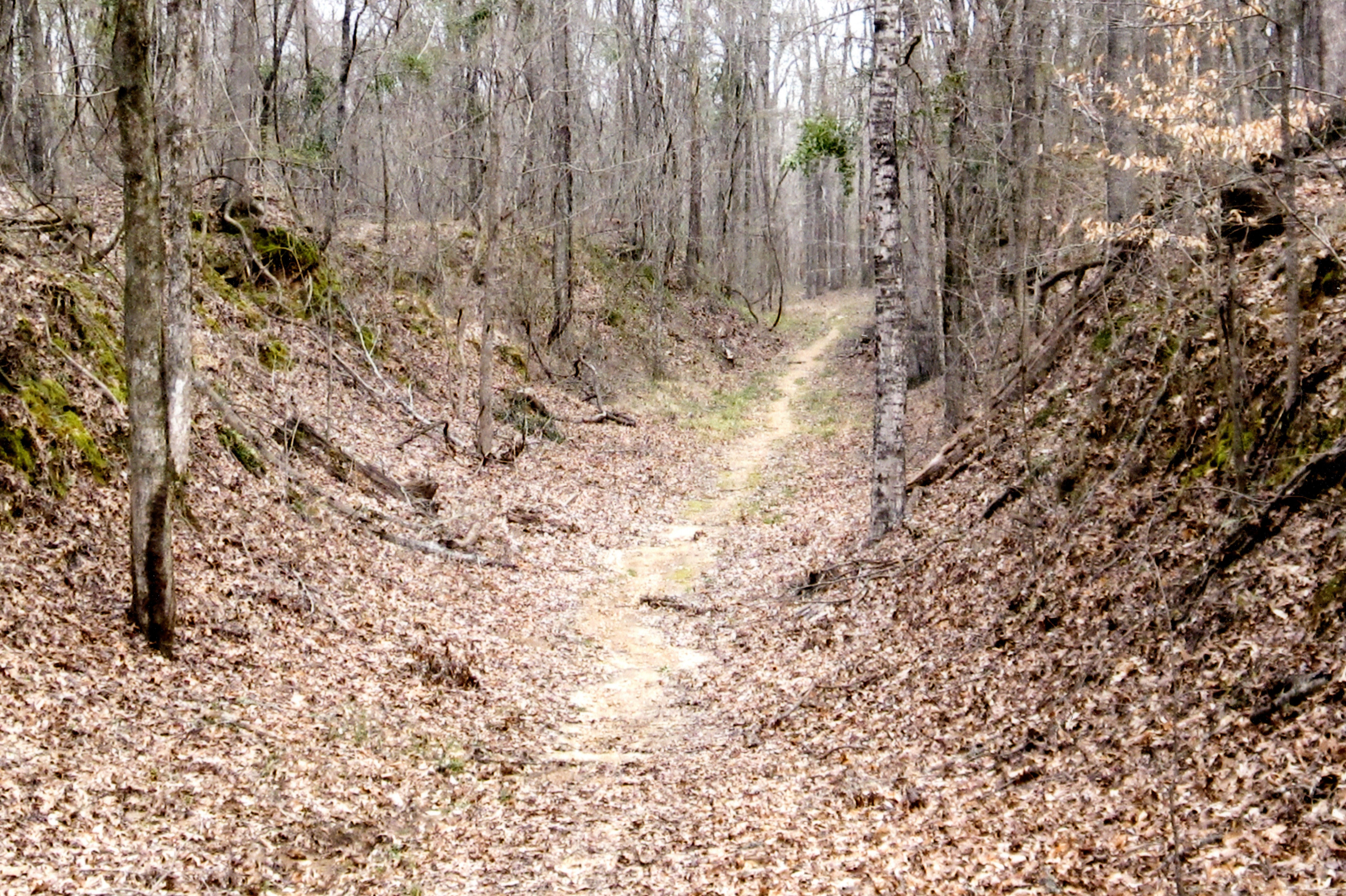
Old Natchez Trace leading to the Grindstone Ford

=== Plantation Empire in the Natchez District ===
David Hunt's uncle Abijah Hunt (1762-1811) had become wealthy as a merchant to the Army at Fort Washington in Cincinnati, Ohio and later in every area of cotton related business in the Natchez District. Abijah lived in Old Greenville, Jefferson County, Mississippi. David moved as a young man to the Natchez District in approximately 1800. He laid claim to 200 acres on Coles Creek in Jefferson County where he lived and cultivated the land beginning in the spring of 1800. This land was near Greenville. In addition to working his land, David also worked as a clerk in one of his uncle's stores - probably in the nearby (now extinct) town of Old Greenville. In his third year, David was promoted to a position managing all of his uncle's stores, which were along the Old Natchez Trace at Natchez in Adams County, Greenville in Jefferson County and at the Grindstone Ford in Claiborne County. It made sense for Abijah and David to live in the Greenville area because it was in approximately equidistance between Abijah's Natchez and Grindstone Ford stores along the Old Natchez Trace. David's salary was, consequently, increased from $200 per year to $3,000 per year due to this promotion. Now he could more quickly expand his enslaved African and land purchases. He married Thomas Calvit's daughter - Mary Calvit - in 1808 and moved to her parents' Calviton Plantation, which was near Old Greenville and David's uncle's Jefferson County plantation called Huntley. Soon after, Mary died in childbirth, and her new child died too.

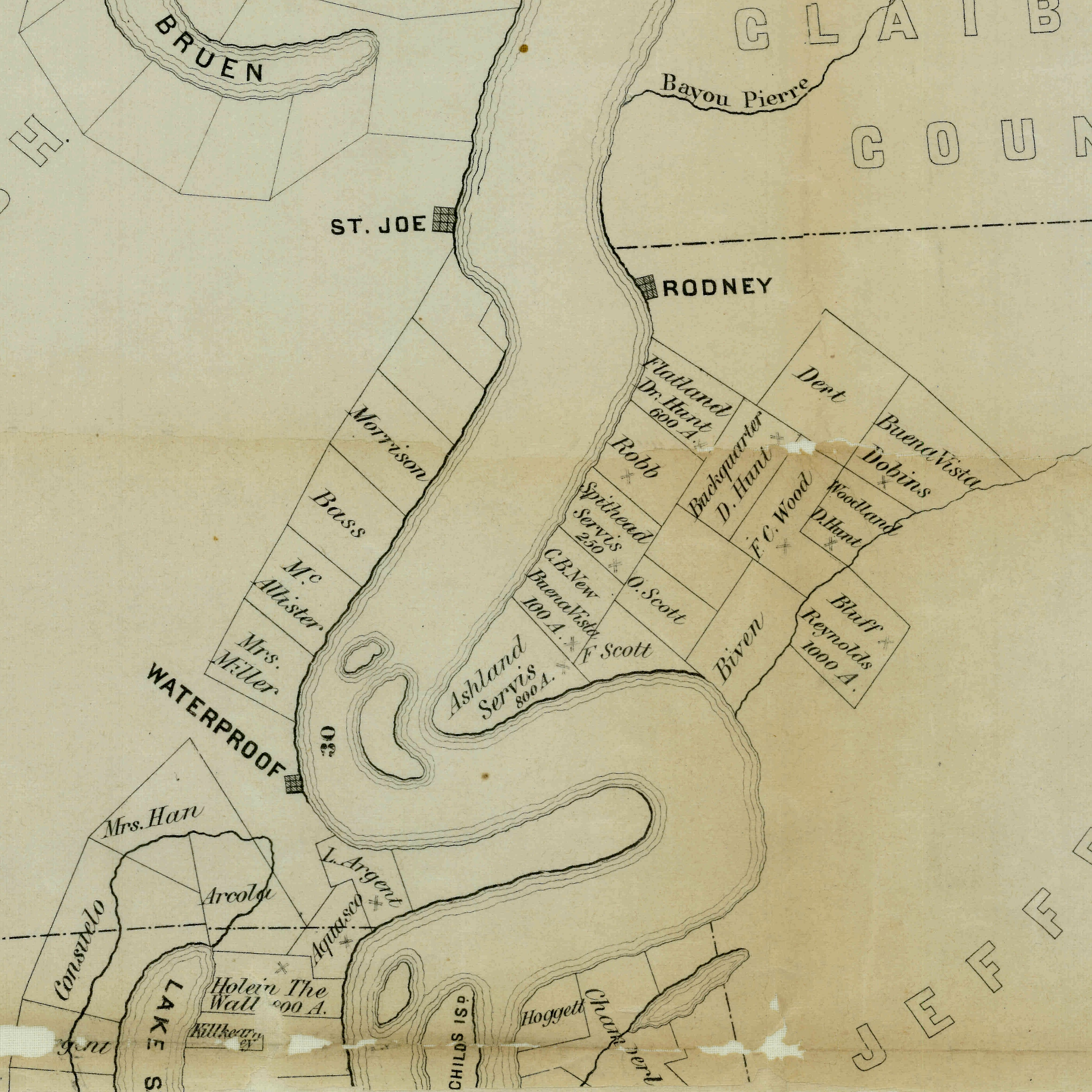
Plantations in the vicinity of Waterproof, and St. Joseph, Louisiana, and Rodney, Mississippi, mapped sometime between 1866 and 1874. The Hunt's Arcola, Hole-in-the-Wall, Woodlawn Woodlawn (misspelled as Woodland on the map), Calviton (listed as E.G.Wood), Brick Quarters, and Fatlands (also known as Flatland) are shown on this map. Huntley Plantation, not shown on the map, was on the opposite side of Coles Creek from Woodlawn.

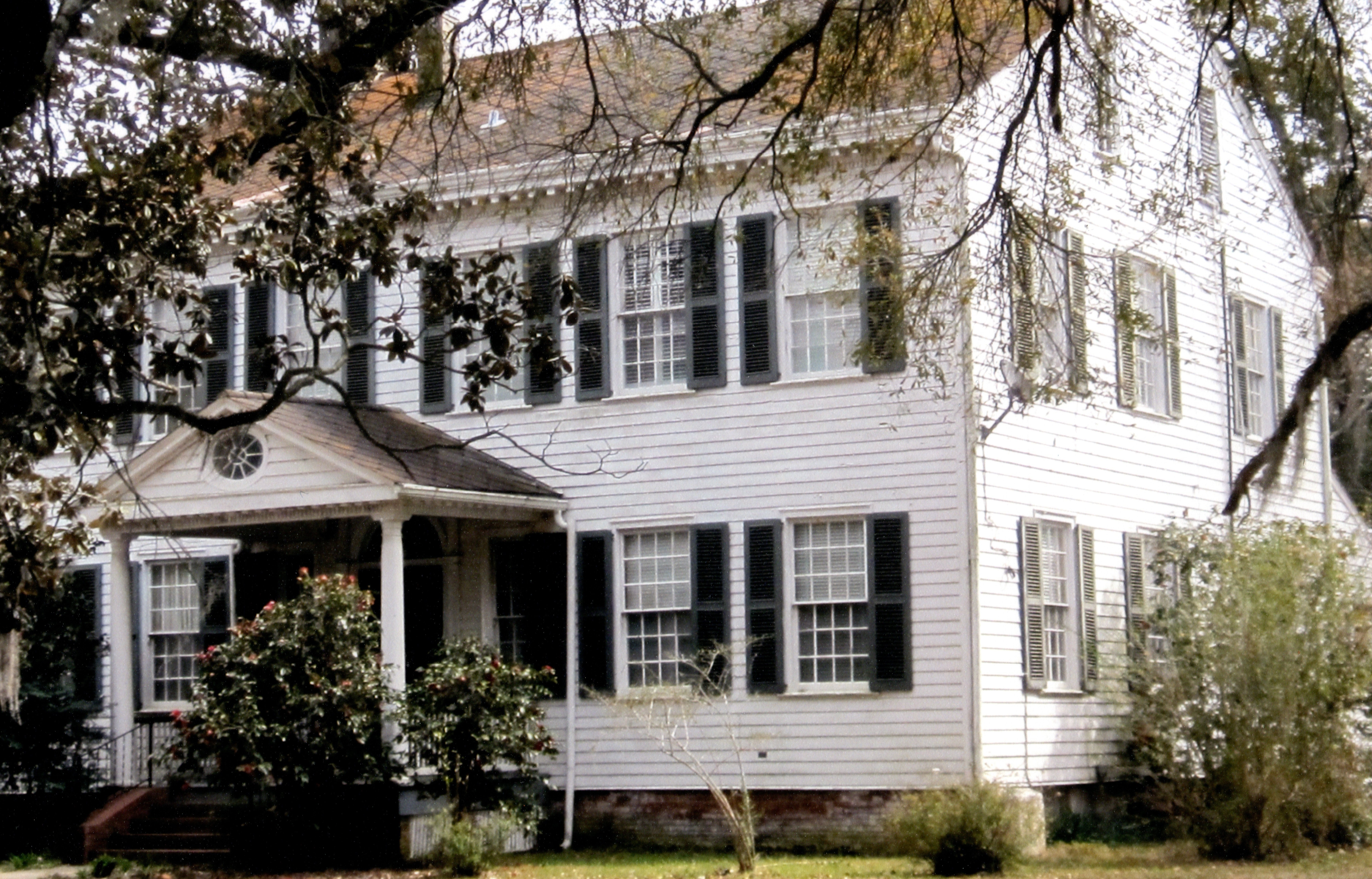
This house was built about 1813 as planter David Hunt's residence on Woodlawn Plantation in Jefferson County, Mississippi. The house began to seem modest as Hunt's wealth increased.

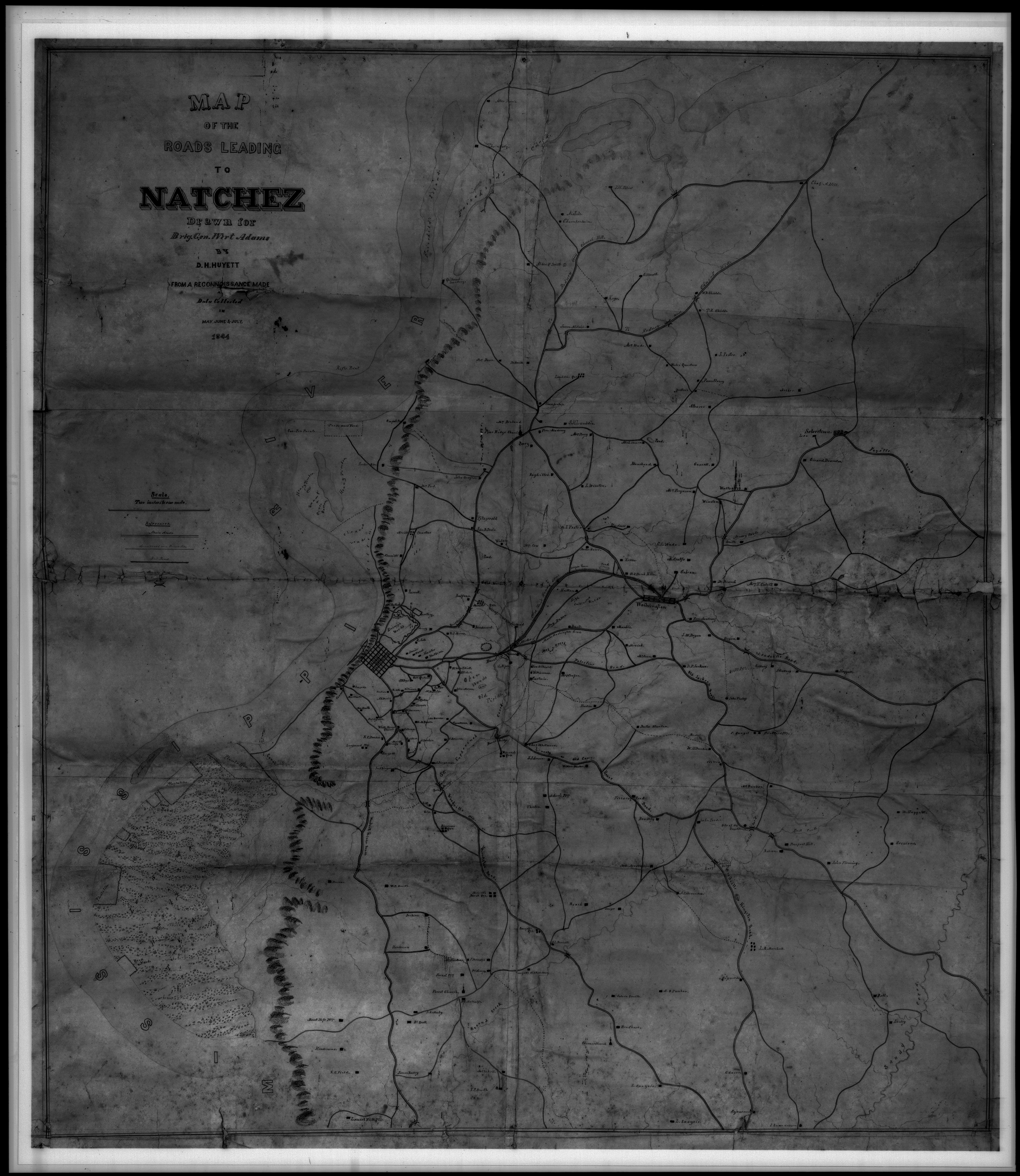
The name Balfour just above and to the right of Natchez is the Homewood estate. Just above that the name "Geo Marshall" is where the Marshall's Lansdowne is located. The name Archer in the upper right area of the map is where Oakwood Plantation with close to 100 enslaved Africans in 1860 is located.

David's Uncle Abijah died in a duel in 1811. After his uncle's 1811 death, David inherited his uncle's extensive land investments and his share in various businesses (general stores, public cotton gins, and a cotton brokerage). Shortly, in 1813 David built a new house on his Woodlawn Plantation, which adjoined Calviton, and in 1817 married Ann Ferguson.

Abijah's estate included more than just the land investments and various businesses. From Abijah's estate inventory, land records and enslaved African censuses, it appears that he had two plantations in total at his death with about 30 enslaved Africans on each. These were Hunt Plantation on the east side of Port Gibson in Claiborne County and Huntley Plantation near the now extinct town of Greenville in Jefferson County. He also had a home in Greenville with a few enslaved house servants, as well as a nice library (which found its way to David's estate). Though David only inherited a very small share of the two plantations and Greenville home, he seems to have acquired most or all of it. As an executor of his uncle's estate, from probate records it appears that David slowly used the profits of the two plantations - rather than selling them - as well as profits from his big inheritance to pay off the other heirs. This helped him to be able to buy out his Uncle's business partners, and sell the businesses to create a large inventory of plantations. Thus, shrewdly using this large inheritance from his Uncle is how David became one of the twelve millionaires in the Natchez area in the antebellum era. It seems to have taken being a rich doctor, lawyer, merchant, banker or having a large inheritance to ever have the wealth necessary to build up more than just one plantation. David and his children eventually owned many plantations.

David Hunt's enslaved African ownership numbers from census data in various years:

- 1805 - Jefferson County, MS, 9
- 1808 - Jefferson County, MS, 11
- 1810 - Jefferson County, MS, 24 (also David's father-in-law Thomas Calvit, 50 enslaved and 3,050 acres on Coles Creek and the MS. River)
- 1811 - David Inherited from his Uncle Abijah: well over 10,000 acres of land in Adams (including Franklin), Jefferson, and Claiborne Counties in Mississippi; and in Concordia and Tensas Parishes in Louisiana. He also was executor for two plantations with approximately 30 enslaved each - Huntley in Jefferson County and Hunt Plantation adjacent to Port Gibson, Claiborne County. David inherited the land comprising these plantations and possibly slowly bought the enslaved, livestock and equipment as he settled his uncle's estate, which was still being settled in 1838.
- 1816 - Jefferson County, MS, 31 (During the War of 1812 when many firms went bankrupt and could be purchased cheaply, David had bought out the other heirs to his uncle's stores. He later sold the stores making $30,000, and invested in a plantation on the Bayou Pierre, probably in Claiborne County. Possibly this was David investing in his uncle's former plantation that was adjacent to Port Gibson and the Bayou Pierre. However, it was sold before very many years, because David was not listed as having slaves in Claiborne County in later years.)
- 1818 - Jefferson County, MS, 70
- 1820 - Jefferson County, MS, 101. Some of the details of this follow. 776 acres which was Fatlands Plantation (also known as Flatlands) on the north side of Dowds Creek with 43 enslaved, 636 acres on Coles Creek known as the Hunt Place, and the 880-acre Black Creek Plantation (which was mainly valuable for its cypress trees). 50 slaves were shared between the Hunt Place (Woodlawn) and Black Creek Plantation.
- 1827 - Jefferson County, MS, 159 enslaved worth $47,800, 7,968 acres worth $78,975, 212 horses and cattle worth $4,460, 6 wheels of pleasure carriages, $3,000 loaned at interest, assessed for tax purposes on $134,235.
- 1860 - Jefferson County, MS, 386 shared between Woodlawn, Southside and Brick Quarters, Fatlands, and Black Creek; Concordia Parish, LA, Hole-in-the-Wall 99; Issaquena County, MS, 82 on Wilderness Plantation; Tensas Parish, LA, 139 on Argyle - in trust for grandchildren by his son Abijah. Thus, he had 567 enslaved if the 139 Argyle enslaved are already being counted as belonging to his grandchildren. Otherwise, he had 706 on seven plantations. Of course, it has been written that by this time he had given away another 500 enslaved and at least five plantations (but most likely eight plantations) to his children - Mary Ann, Abijah, George, Catherine and Charlotte.

In addition to the many plantations listed below, the Hunt family is also associated with the following plantations: Waverly, Fatherland, Fairview, Oak Burn, Givin Place and others. Approximately, by 1860 the Hunt clan (David Hunt, his children and their spouses) had built up to at least 450 enslaved in Issaquena County (including William Balfour's Fairland), 359 enslaved in Louisiana, 25 enslaved in Adams County, and 750 enslaved in Jefferson County (Including Edgar Wood's Givin Place). Thus, Hunt clan ownership of between 1,600 to 1,700 enslaved Africans is not an exaggeration. From loans to his children in David Hunt's probate records and from land inherited and purchased by David that went to his children, it is clear that David was bankrolling the aggressive expansion of the family cotton plantation empire with each year's plantation profits.

- Jefferson County. In 1862 David's approximately 375 Jefferson County enslaved Africans were shared between Woodlawn (123 enslaved), Brick Quarters (sometimes called Southside and Brick Quarters - 128 enslaved), Fatlands (approximately 121 enslaved), and Black Creek (3 enslaved). Only three enslaved Africans were on Black Creek - possibly because it was mostly a cypress swamp. The enslaved are listed by name in the probate records on the Family Search website. Other Jefferson County plantations that David Hunt was associated with included: Calviton, Huntley, Ashland, Oakwood, Buena Vista, and Servis Island. These were plantations that David bought, created or inherited and gave to his children or plantations that others created on land that David sold to them.
  - Plantations David still owned in Jefferson County when he died in 1861.
    - Woodlawn. Woodlawn was David Hunt's home plantation. Probate records show 123 enslaved by 1862. David's Woodlawn home is dated 1813, which is shortly after his Uncle Abijah's death. After inheriting Huntley, land records show that David purchased about 300 acres adjoining Calviton for his Woodlawn house and much more land over the years, which eventually created the plantation and connected it to Huntley Plantation as well. Calviton and Huntley were given to David's sons Adijah and George, respectively. Woodlawn was on Cole's Creek, seven miles south of the town of Rodney. It was about 1,500 acres when it was sold to the Wagners after the Hunts owned it. It was then increased to 2,200 acres.
    - Brick Quarters Plantation. The Brick Quarters enslaved count was 128 in 1862 probate records. It was sometimes referred to as Southside or Southside and Brick Quarters in later years when it was expanded to the Mississippi River and to adjoin Fatlands Plantation on the southside of Dowd's creek. It adjoined Calviton Plantation. David Hunt's son Dunbar inherited Southside after the Civil War. Dunbar had more than 50 acres of pecan trees there. He sold one crop to the Hotel Waldorf in New York for one dollar per pound. Southside was 2,200 acres. Southside and Brick Quarters was located on maps in and around Sections 28-29-38 T10N-R1W.
    - Fatlands Plantation. It was on the north side of Dowds Creek opposite Southside Plantation. It was also on the Mississippi River - just south of the town of Rodney. In 1862 probate records, the plantation had 121 enslaved.
    - Black Creek Plantation. It possibly contained 3,200 acres located on Coles Creek near the Mississippi River. It was given to David Hunt's daughter Elizabeth when she married William F. Ogden after the Civil War. Its main value was in its cypress trees. Thus, it was probably swampy, and only had 3 enslaved in 1862 probate records. It was put into a trust for Elizabeth's children. Black Creek Plantation was located on maps in and around Sections 39-40 T10N-R1W.
  - Oakwood. David gave his daughter Mary Ann Hunt and her husband James Archer Oakwood Plantation for their home. Census records show that they had 98 enslaved in the county in 1860. The house was large with wings on each side. Between 1840 and 1860 Mr. Archer ran a school there for the area youngsters. The plantation started with 1,000 acres and was enlarged to 2,000 acres. Oakwood was located on maps in and around Section 27 T8N-R1W.
  - Calviton. It adjoined Woodlawn and was Thomas Calvit's Plantation. David Hunt's wife Mary Calvit was Thomas Calvit's daughter. David lived on Calviton while he was married to Mary. David later bought the plantation. David gave it to his son Abijah. Abijah died, and his widow married Edgar G. Wood who also owned Wilkin Place. They had 88 enslaved on Calviton and 156 on Wilkin Place in the 1860 census. Calviton Plantation was located on maps in and around Section 47 T10N-R1W.
  - Huntley. It was inherited by David from his Uncle Abijah when it had about 30 enslaved. David gave it to his son George Ferguson Hunt when he married Anna Watson, daughter of James Watson. It had 59 enslaved in the 1860 census. Huntley was located on maps in and around Sections 10 T9N-R1E & Sect 3-26 T9N-R1W. It adjoined Woodlawn Plantation on the opposite side of Cole's Creek.
  - Buena Vista. Zachary Taylor bought the approximately 2,000-acre Buena Vista Plantation (also known as Cypress Grove Plantation), which bordered Ashland Plantation and was formed on the land of David Hunt and others. It was located about ten miles south of Rodney on the Mississippi River. President Taylor and his son Richard "Dick" Taylor - later a Confederate General - visited Hunt's residence on Woodlawn Plantation. Buena Vista was located on maps in and around T10N-R2W.
  - Ashland and Servis Island Plantations. They were sold to David Servis, making him very rich. He had probably worked helping David Hunt manage his plantations previously. Ashland was located on maps in and around Sect-13-14 T10N-R2W on the Mississippi River.
- His Adams County plantations came from his wife Ann Ferguson Hunt's ancestors.
  - Lansdowne, located three miles north of Natchez (on what is now highway 555 - M.L. King Road); David gave the land to his daughter Charlotte when she married George Marshall. Because Marshall's father was also one of the Natchez millionaires like David Hunt, George and Charlotte could afford to operate Lansdowne as a residence and hunting estate before the Civil War, with 16 enslaved in 1860. It became a plantation after the War because their larger Arcola plantation had been lost.
  - Homewood, which adjoined Lansdowne. It was located on Pine Ridge Road, now M.L. King Road, in the northern suburbs of Natchez. David gave the land to his daughter Catherine when she married William Balfour. Balfour's father was rich enough to give several of his children large plantations like David Hunt did for his children, so William and Catherine too were able to just operate Homewood as a residence and hunting estate before the Civil War with 9 enslaved. Balfour also had the large Fairland Plantation in Issaquena County.
  - Oakley Grove, located nine miles northeast of Natchez. Oakley Grove was Ann's grandfather, Robert Dunbar's, home at the site of the current Adams County airport. He had previously lived in a house at the Lansdowne mansion site which had burned. He was the patriarch of the rich country Dunbar planter clan in the area. Possibly this plantation never belonged to the Hunt's, or they only inherited a partial share.

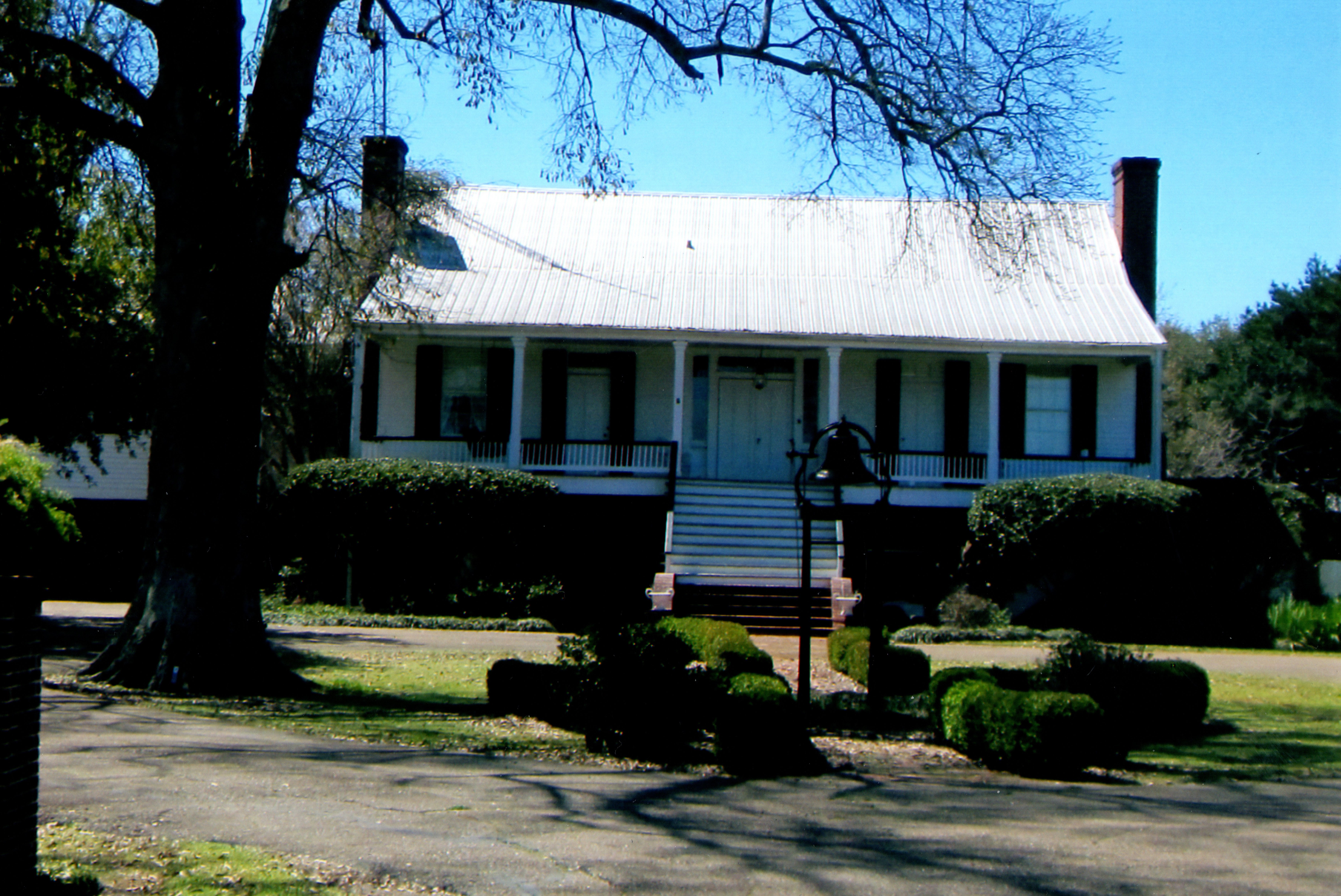
Raised Planter's Cottage on Frogmore Plantation, near Ferriday, Louisiana. This is what the managers' houses looked like on the Hunt clan's plantations where they were absentee owners, such as their Issaquena County, Mississippi plantations and their Louisiana plantations.

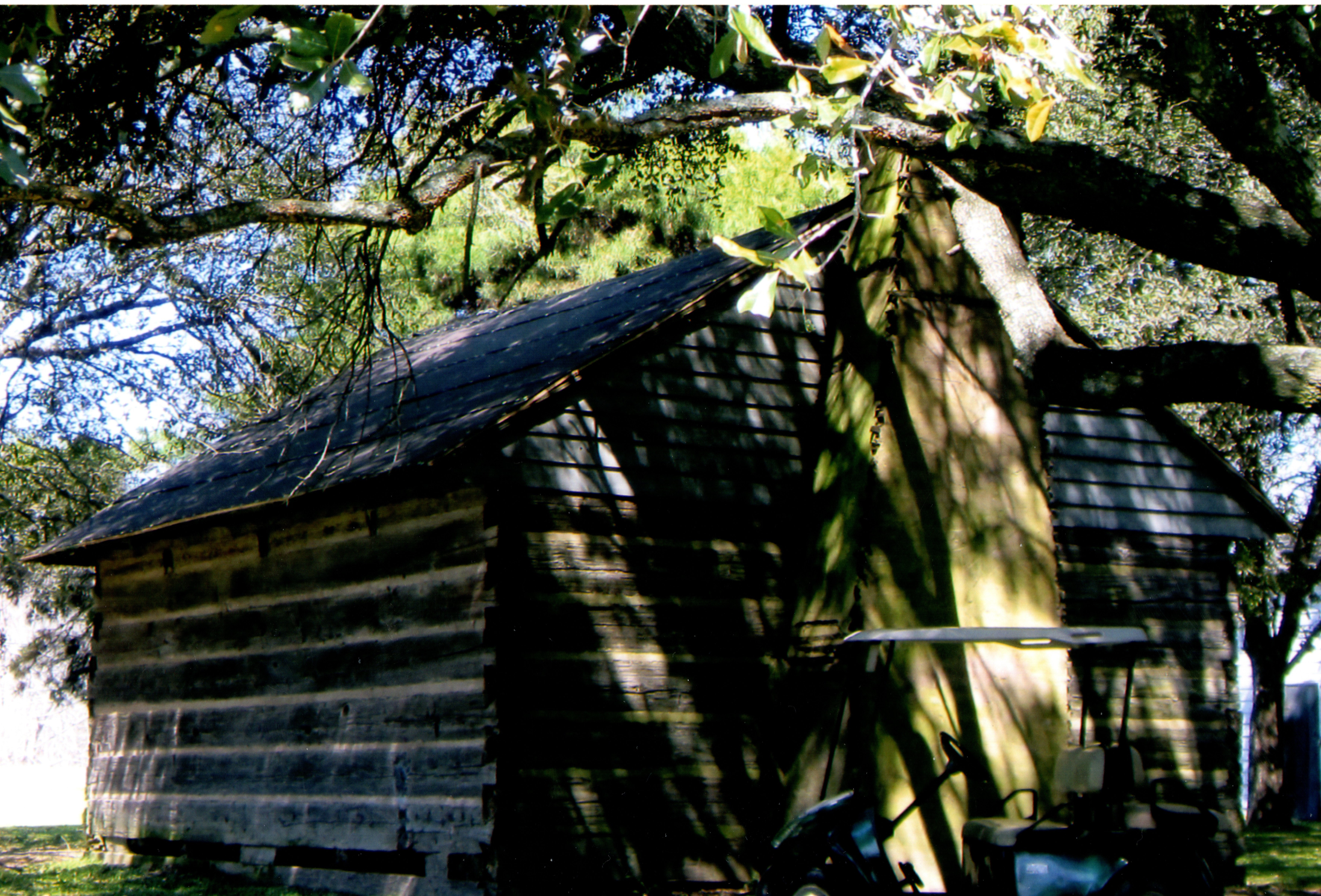
Building that was apparently moved from David Hunt's Flatlands (or Fatlands) Plantation in Jefferson County, Mississippi to the Frogmore Plantation tourist site near Ferriday, Louisiana

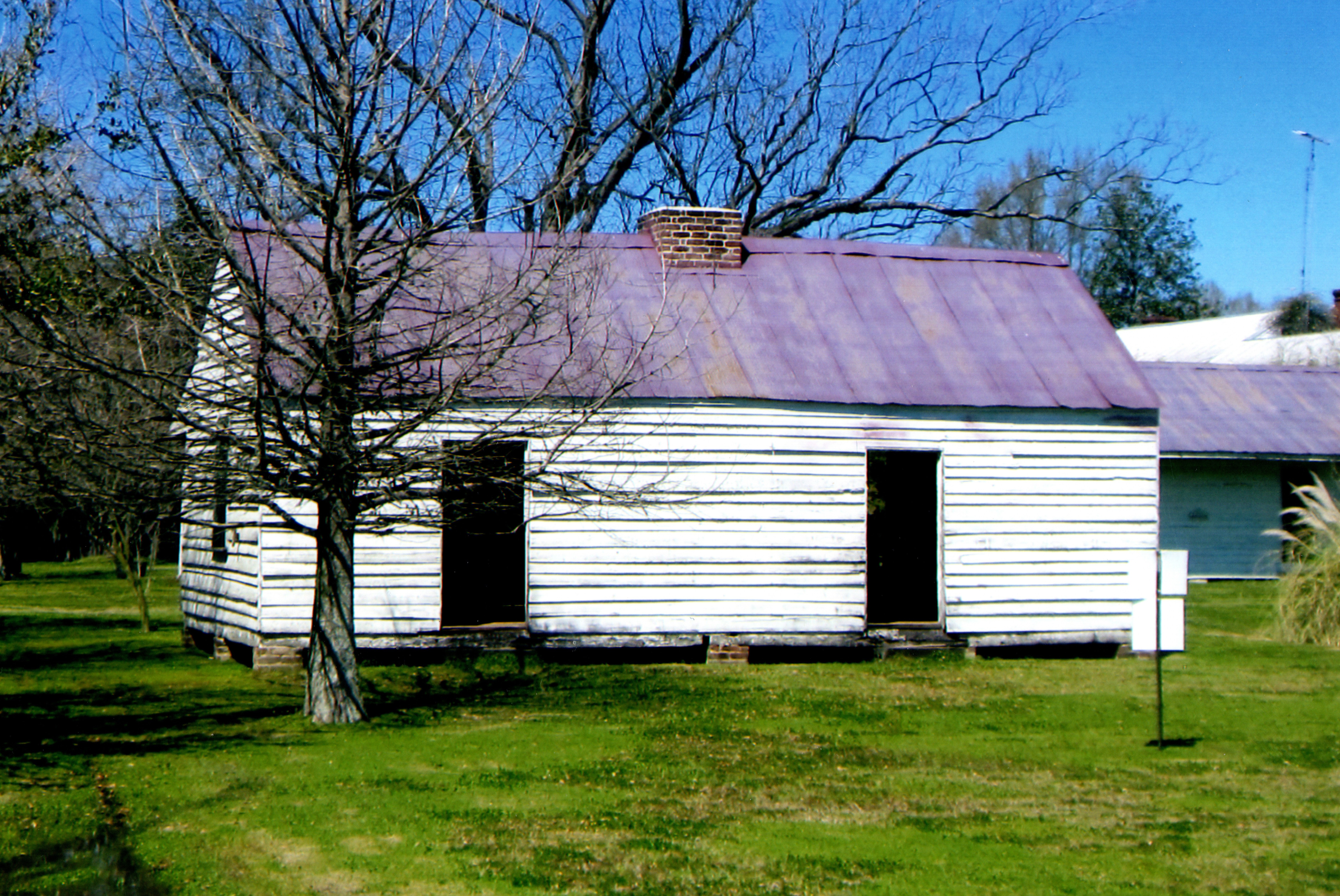
Enslaved Quarters at Frogmore Plantation tourist site near Ferriday, Louisiana. This is similar to the quarters on the Hunt Plantations.

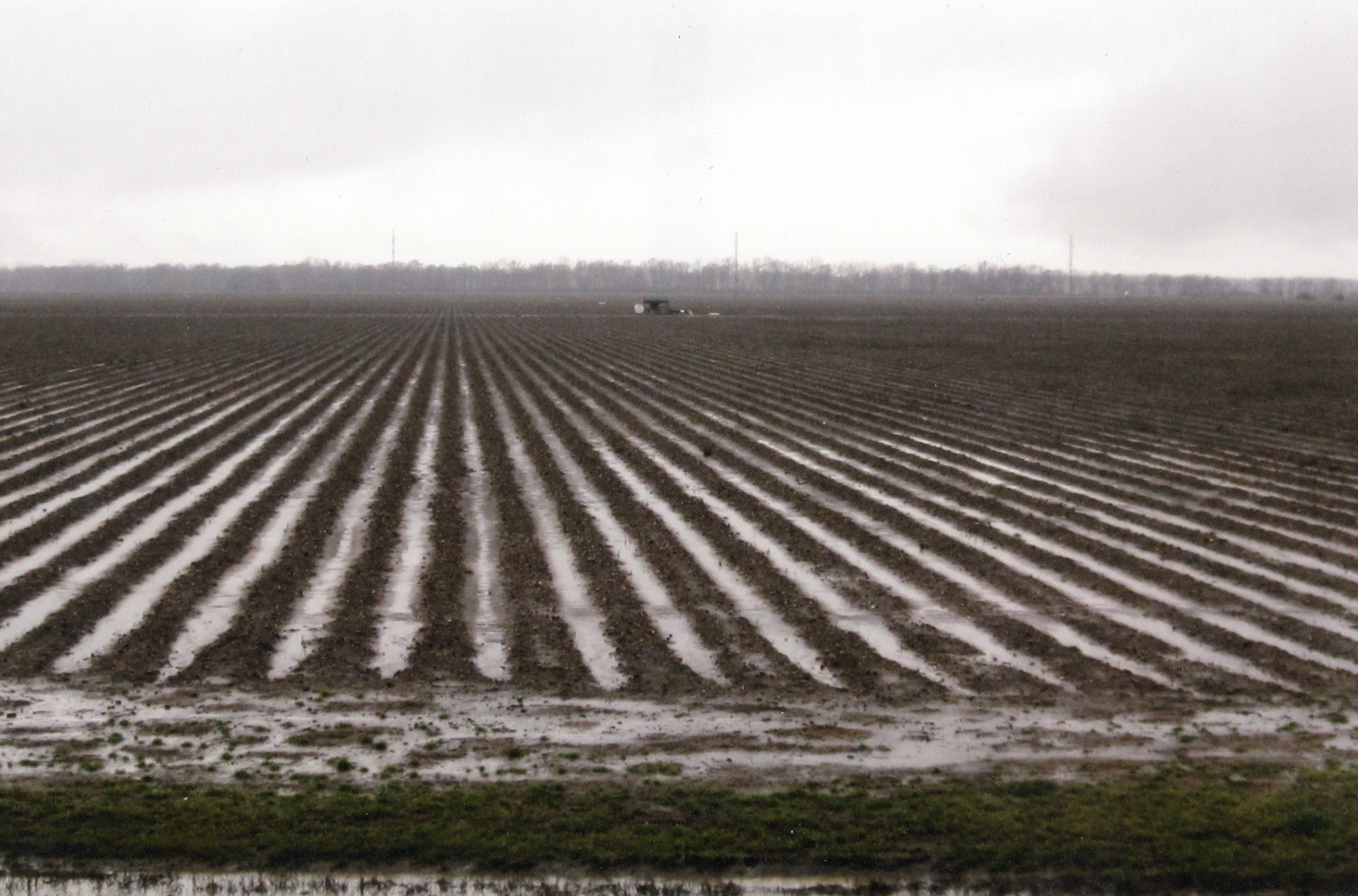
Cotton Field on Maxwell Road in Concordia Parish, Louisiana. This view is near the Hole-in-the-Wall Plantation site looking away from the Mississippi River toward the tree line in the distance. This is typical of the landscape where some of the Hunt enslaved lived and worked.

- His Issaquena County plantations were:
  - Wilderness Plantation, located on the Mississippi River near Mayerville; David's son Andrew was given Wilderness; however, the plantation reverted back to David, because Andrew died as a young adult. David's son Dunbar got it when his father died. The plantation had 2,500 acres with about 1,200 under cultivation. It had 82 enslaved Africans in 1860.
  - Georgiana Plantation, located on Deer Creek south of Rolling Fork. David gave his son George Hunt the Georgiana Plantation along with Huntley Plantation. In the 1860 census, the plantation had 147 enslaved in 26 houses. The manager's house has been restored. It was to the east of Lockwood.
  - Lockwood. George also owned 400 acres on the Mississippi River in Issaquena County close to Tallulah known as Lochwood. In the 1860 census, the property had 13 slaves in 9 houses. It adjoined George's brother-in-law William Balfour's much larger Fairland Plantation. It had an almost identical manager's house as the one on Georgiana, but it has since been lost in a tornado.
- The Hunt Family Louisiana plantations. Bureau of Land Management survey maps show that David Hunt's Uncle Abijah Hunt and his partners originally purchased the core land for these plantations. David wound up with the land after his uncle's 1811 death. Census records don't indicate that Abijah owned any enslaved Africans in Louisiana.
  - Arcola, located just south of the town of Waterproof, Louisiana, in Tensas Parish near the Mississippi River and Hole-in-the-Wall Plantation. It was given to David's daughter Charlotte when she married George Marshall along with Lansdowne Plantation. Arcola was lost after the Civil War, so Lansdowne then had to be converted from a hunting estate to a plantation by the Marshalls. As of 2025, the Marshall descendants still live in the Lansdowne mansion.
  - Argyle and Belle Ella. They were adjoining plantations, located to the west of Waterproof, and were also in Tensas Parish; Statistics for Argyle Plantation in 1860 follow.
    - The plantation was in a trust for David Hunt's then deceased son Abijah's children who lived on Calviton Plantation.
    - 135 enslaved Africans in 30 houses
    - Real estate value is $120,000 and personal property value is $109,600
    - 1,000 improved acres and 1,400 unimproved acres
    - 2 horses, 34 asses and mules, 10 milch cows, 14 working oxen, 20 other cattle, $4,510 livestock value
    - 5,000 bushels of Indian corn, 750 bales of cotton at 400 pounds each, 120 pounds of wool, 200 bushels of peas and beans, $50 in slaughtered meat
  - Hole in the Wall, located on the Mississippi River on Maxwell Road in northern Concordia Parish, Louisiana Hole in the Wall was given to David's daughter Elizabeth after the Civil War when she married William F. Ogden, son of Abner Nash Ogden, along with Black Creek Plantation. The following is information about Hole in the Wall plantation in 1860
    - 99 Enslaved Africans in 16 dwellings
    - 700 acres of improved land and 365 acres of unimproved land
    - Real estate valued at $78,250, Farm implements and machinery valued at $4,160
    - 30 asses and mules, 20 milch cows, 16 working oxen, 92 sheep, 150 swine, 50 other cattle, $5,284 livestock value
    - 4,500 bushels of Indian corn, 607 cotton bales of 400 pounds each, 200 pounds of wool, 1,000 bushels of peas and beans, 150 bushels of Irish potatoes, 1,000 bushels of sweet potatoes, $618 in slaughtered meat.
    - From a family account, the plantation had a one and a half storied raised cottage for the manager that faced the levee road (Maxwell Road) and the Mississippi River beyond. Since Ogden had returned from fighting in the Civil War as a captain, his family lived in the Garden District, New Orleans where he worked as a lawyer. The house was at 287 Jackson at the corner with Carondelet (the street has since been renumbered). Ogden's wife Elizabeth died, and he remarried to the children's music teacher Mary Davies. After the War, Hole-in-the-Wall was losing money. After this second marriage, Ogden moved his family there to try to save it. The account lists the plantation size at 3,500 acres; thus, it was probably expanded from its 1860 size. He eventually lost it for a debt of $3,000. It was thought that, being a lawyer, he did not know how to run a plantation. The family moved in with the Walworths in Natchez at the Burn, because one of the children had married into the Walworth family. William (Billy) Ogden died at the Burn. The remaining family ran a boarding house in Natchez after that. They dispersed as the children married and moved on. Ogden's mother's ancestors had Independence Plantation (Isreal Smith, descendant of Rev. Jedediah Smith) on Second Creek in Adams County

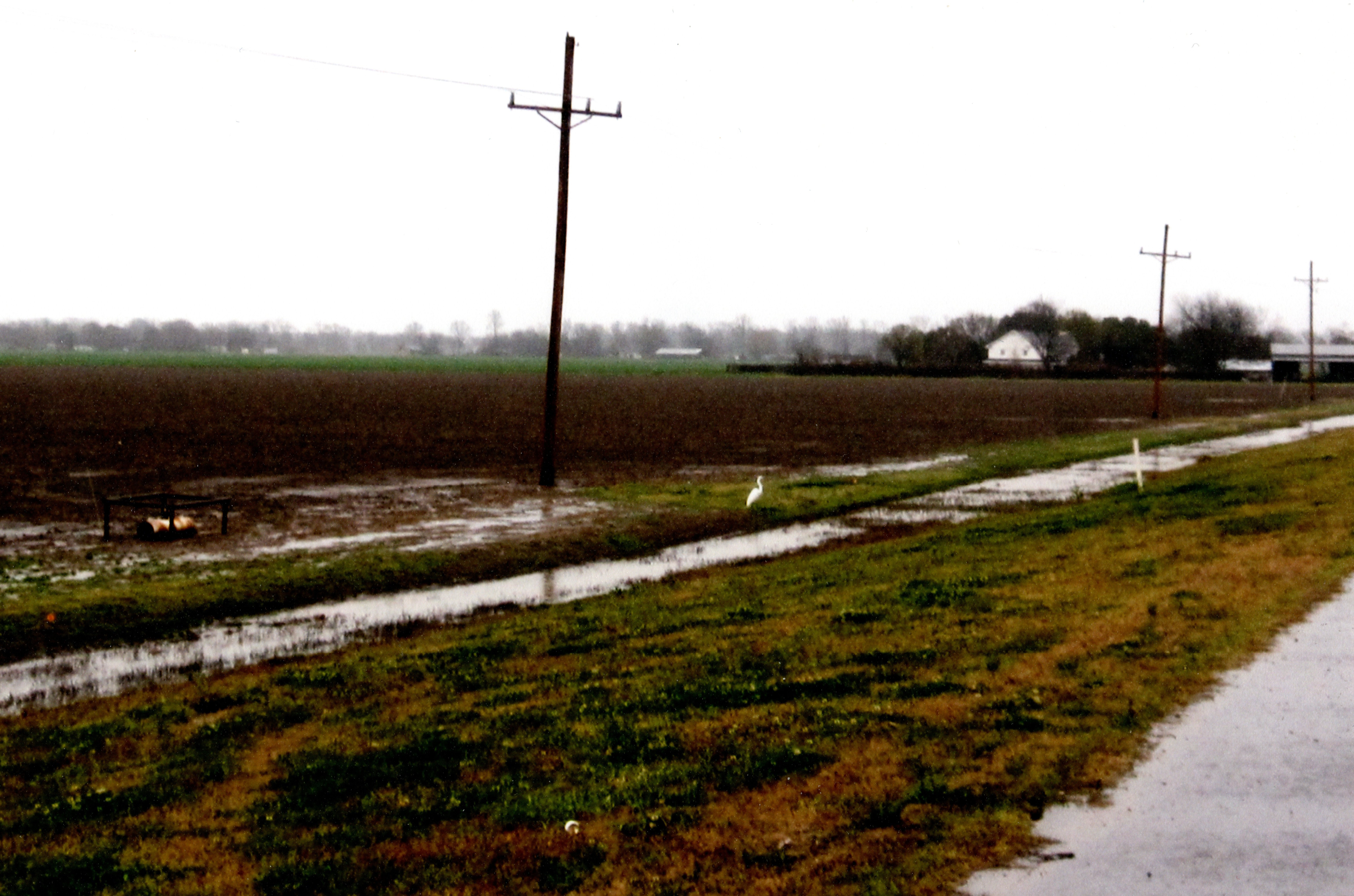
Scene looking away from the Mississippi River on Maxwell Road in Concordia Parish, LA near the Hole in the Wall Plantation site.

Shortly before the American Civil War, Hunt and his adult children owned a total of some 1,700 enslaved Africans and controlled tens of thousands of acres of land. Two of the people Hunt enslaved, Cyrus Bellus and Peter Brown, recorded interviews that were later included in the WPA Slave Narrative Collection for the state of Arkansas.

As a result of his extensive holdings and cotton production, Hunt became one of the wealthiest cotton planters in the Antebellum South. Additionally, he owned business concerns in Cincinnati, Ohio, and Lexington, Kentucky. At his financial peak in about 1850, Hunt was worth about $2,000,000.

=== Philanthropy ===
Hunt was among the largest financial supporters of Oakland College, near Rodney, Mississippi and David's home on Woodlawn Plantation, which was founded in affiliation with the Presbyterian Church. Over the years he gave a total of about $175,000 to the college. He was a trustee of the College for years. His sons, Abijah, George, Andrew and Dunbar, all graduated from Oakland College. Oakland had to close during the war, as its students went off to war. Some of the facility was damaged during the war, and it never successfully resumed operations after the war.

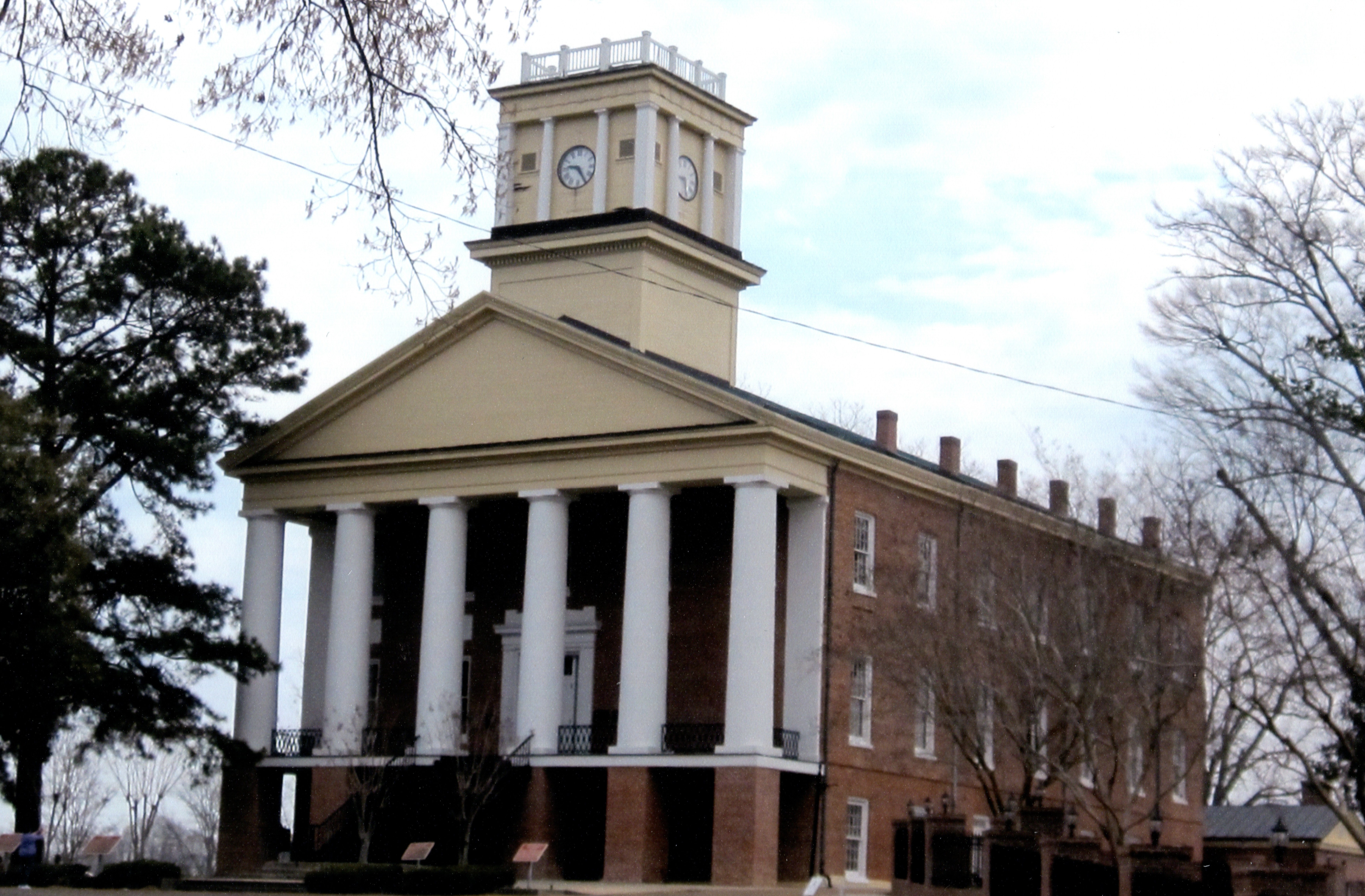
Oakland College Chapel 2013 - now part of Alcorn State University

In 1870 the college was sold to the state of Mississippi. The state legislature used this facility to establish the first land grant institution for African Americans in American history, named Alcorn A&M College and now called Alcorn University, a historically black college.

The Presbyterian Church used the money from the sale to found Chamberlain-Hunt Academy in nearby Port Gibson in 1879. C.H.A. transitioned to the military routine in 1915 and was a military college preparatory school until 1971, when girls were admitted and the military discipline was greatly relaxed. Many of David Hunt's descendants or relatives attended Chamberlain-Hunt over the years. The old school did not open in August 2014 and the future is uncertain. The legacy of Oakland College was named to honor Presbyterian minister Reverend Jeremiah Chamberlain (1794-1851), the founding president of Oakland College, and David Hunt, who had been Oakland's most generous benefactor.

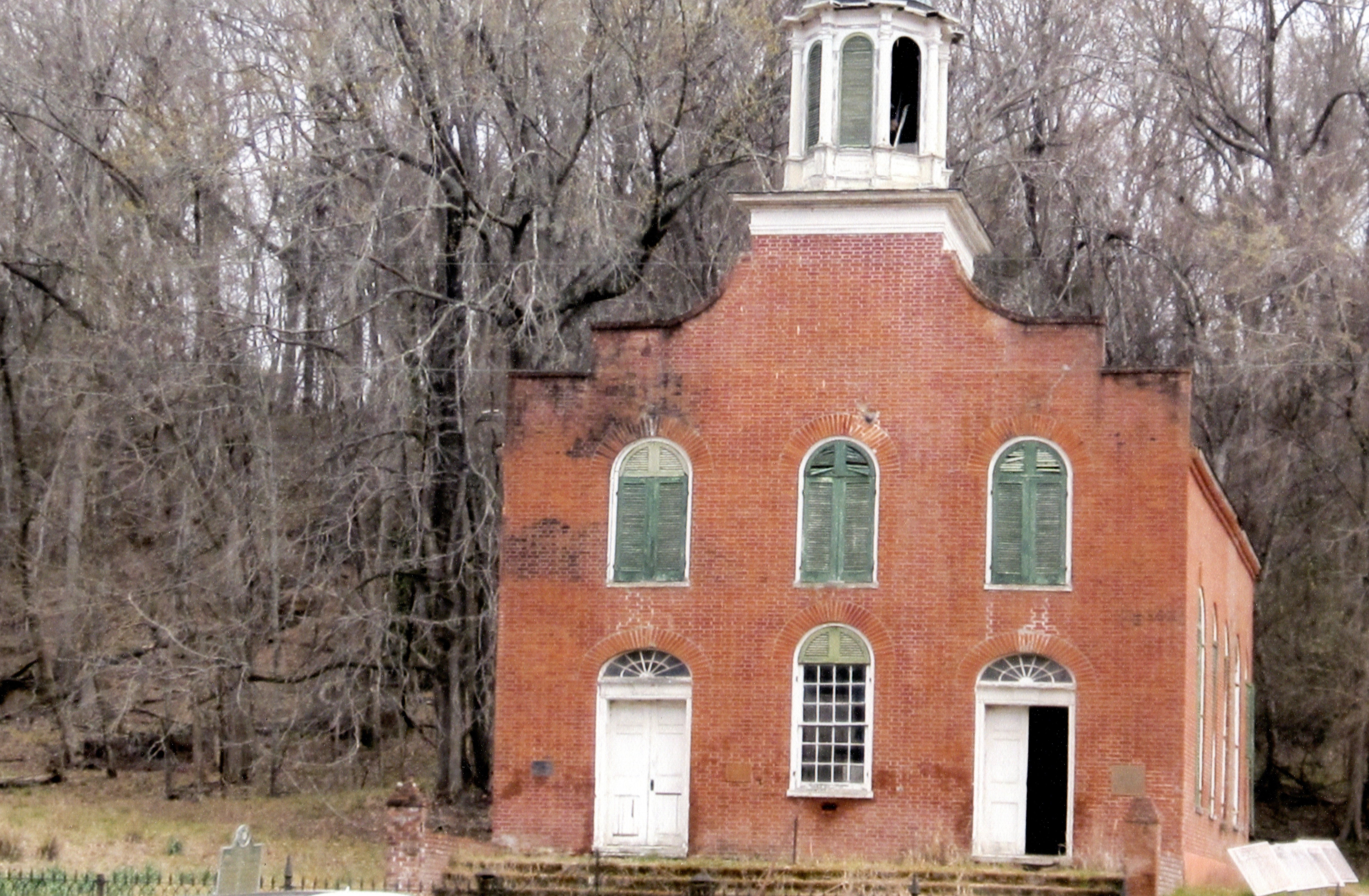
Rodney Presbyterian Church

Hunt also was a major supporter of the Rodney Presbyterian Church. He donated the land upon which the church was built and contributed to the building of the church as well. All of his children were baptized there. When the church decided to rent the pews to the church members to raise money, Hunt paid to rent them all to ensure that the poor could attend. He paid a large portion of the pastor's salary, gave the pastor the use of one of his slaves, and often gave the pastor beef and mutton from his plantations. Hunt also gave beef to the poor families of Rodney each Christmas.

As a member of the Mississippi Colonization Society and its parent organization the American Colonization Society, he donated to establish a colony for free African Americans in Liberia. Hunt once donated $49,999.99 to this cause. One of Hunt's eccentricities was to write checks for one penny less than an even dollar amount. He also gave a small amount to the Fayette Female Academy in Fayette, Mississippi.

He donated $1,000 currency to the 1840 Natchez tornado relief fund.

=== Personal life ===
Hunt resided on Woodlawn Plantation in Jefferson County, Mississippi, which was seven miles south of Rodney, Mississippi, and approximately 25 miles northeast of Natchez. He was one of the twelve millionaires living near Natchez in the antebellum era, when there were only thirty-five millionaires living in the entire United States. He was nicknamed "King David."

Hunt spent many summers in and around Lexington, Kentucky. He travelled by carriage along with a baggage wagon and saddle horses. The trip from Mississippi took one month. He was related to John Wesley Hunt, who lived in the Hunt-Morgan House in Lexington.

Hunt married three times

- His first wife was Margaret (Stampley) Hunt during the Territorial Period. Margaret was a daughter of John Stampley, who served as a president of the legislative council of Mississippi Territory.
- His second wife was Mary (Calvit) Hunt. He married her in 1808, and she died in childbirth in 1809. The child died soon after that as well.
- His third wife was Ann (Ferguson) Hunt. They married in 1816 or 1817. Ann's father David Ferguson (son of William Ferguson and Paulina Burch) grew up on his parents' Mount Locust Inn and Plantation; and her sister Charlotte, who was married to William Aylette Buckner, lived at Airlie.
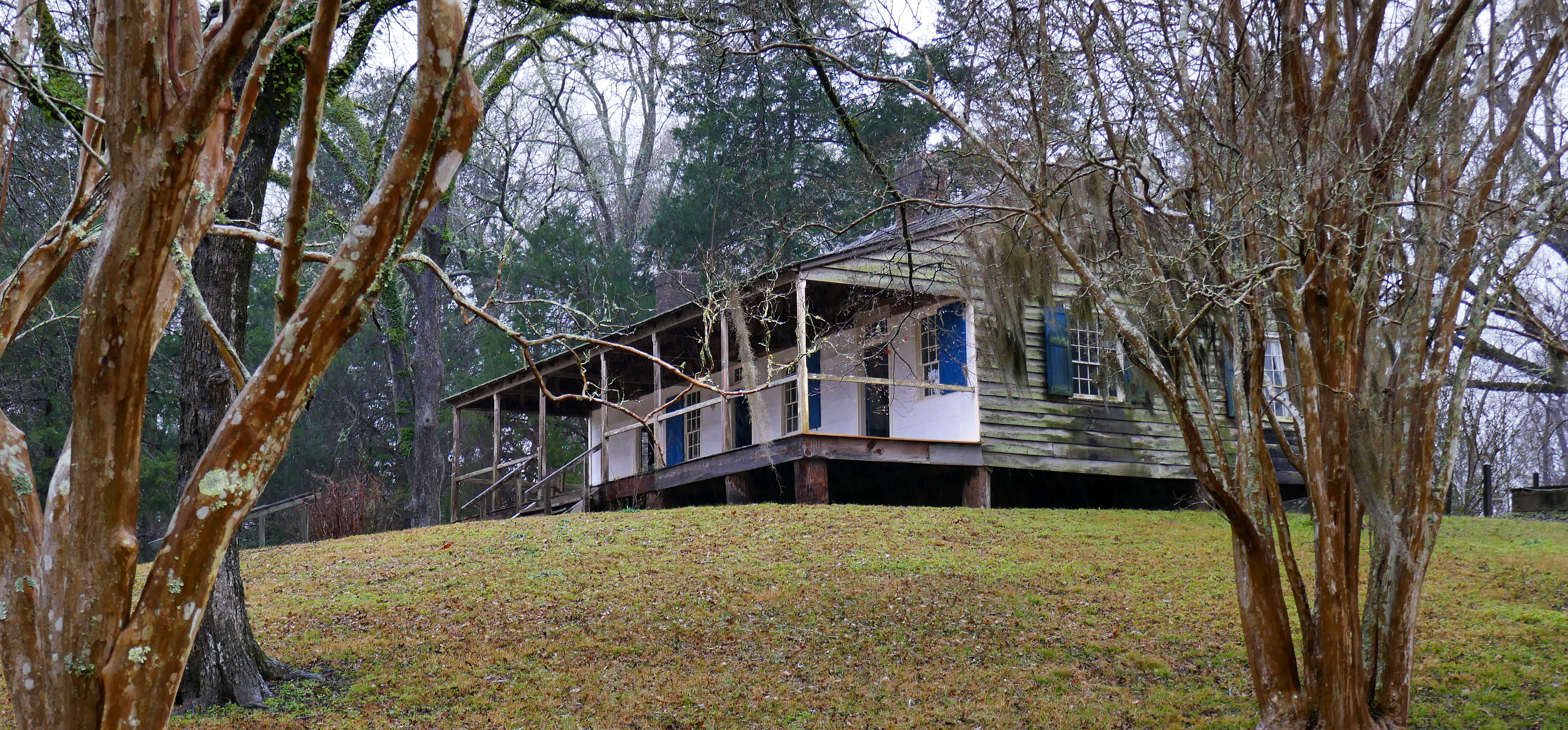
  Mount Locust, a "stand," or inn, that served travelers the early 1800s. It is one of the oldest structures left on the Old Natchez Trace.
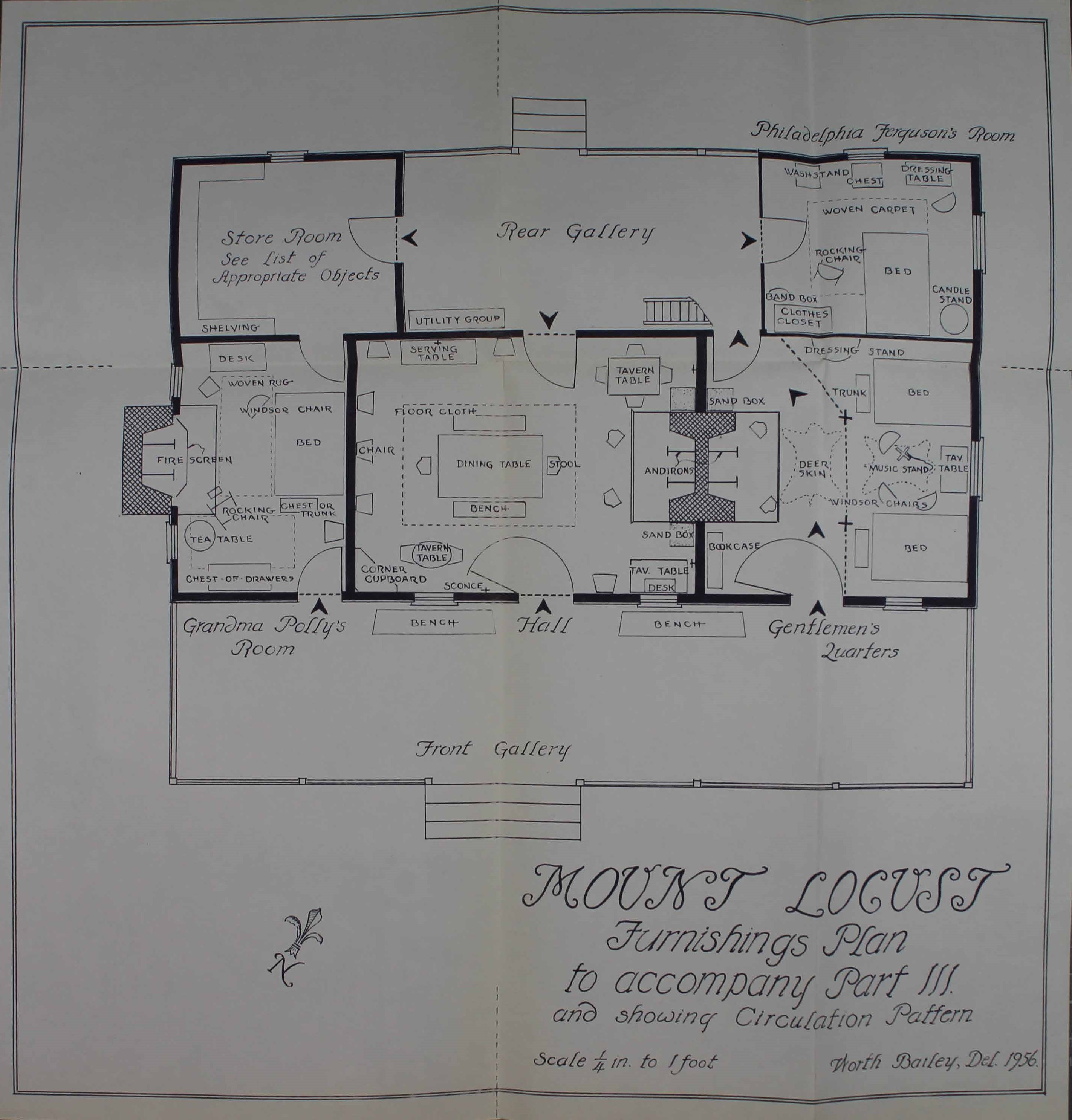
  Mount Locust Furnishings to Accompany Part III - NARA - 40910438
  Ann and her husband David Hunt had 14 children, but only seven lived past the age of 21. Five of these adult children married before the Civil War. Hunt gave each at least one plantation and 100 slaves as a dowry. These gifts made all of Hunt's children wealthy, but reduced Hunt's net worth, which was listed in the 1860 U.S. Census as $1,086,825.
1. His daughter Mary Ann married James Archer and received Oakwood Plantation.
2. His son Abijah married Mary Agnes Walton and was given Calviton Plantation. Abijah and Mary's children received Argyle Plantation, and Belle Ella Plantation, which was possibly split off from Argyle. When Abijah died, Mary Agnes remarried to Edgar Wood who had Wilkin Place Plantation.
3. His son George Ferguson Hunt married Anna Watson and received Huntley Plantation. George also received Georgiana Plantation, and he had the Lockwood property.
4. His daughter Catherine married William S. Balfour and received Homewood. William also had Fairland Plantation
5. His daughter Charlotte married George Marshall and received Lansdowne Plantation. George and Charlotte also received Arcola Plantation.

Two of David's seven adult children (Dunbar and Elizabeth) married after the American Civil War and David's death. They each got at least one plantation, but the slaves had been emancipated.

1. His son Dunbar married Leila Lawrence Brent and received Wilderness Plantation and Southside Plantation.
2. His daughter Elizabeth married William F. Ogden and received Hole in the Wall Plantation and Black Creek Plantation.

=== Death ===
Hunt died on May 18, 1861, on Woodlawn Plantation at the age of 81. He was buried in the Calviton Plantation cemetery. Calviton Plantation adjoined Woodlawn Plantation where David had his main residence.

== Legacy ==
- The Chamberlain-Hunt Academy, a Presbyterian military private academy in Port Gibson, Mississippi, was named in his honor.
- The David Hunt Award is made annually at Alcorn State University in Lorman, Mississippi.

== See also ==
- Lansdowne (Natchez, Mississippi)
- Homewood Plantation (Natchez, Mississippi)
- Woodlawn Plantation (Jefferson County, Mississippi)
- Abijah Hunt
- List of plantations in Mississippi
- List of the oldest buildings in Mississippi
- Plantation complexes in the Southern United States
- African-American history
- American gentry
- Atlantic slave trade
- Casa-Grande & Senzala (similar concept in Brazilian plantations)
- History of the Southern United States
- Journal of a Residence on a Georgian Plantation in 1838–1839
- List of plantations in the United States
- Lost Cause of the Confederacy
- Plain Folk of the Old South (1949 book by historian Frank Lawrence Owsley)
- Plantation-era songs
- Plantation house
- Plantation tradition (genre of literature)
- Plantations of Leon County (Florida)
- Planter class
- Sharecropping in the United States
- Slavery at Tuckahoe plantation
- Slavery in the United States
- Treatment of slaves in the United States
- Torture of slaves in the United States
- White supremacy
- Commons:Category:Old maps of plantations in the United States
