= Homewood Plantation (Natchez, Mississippi) =

Plantation with mansion in Mississippi, US

Coordinates: 31.576563°N 91.370270°W

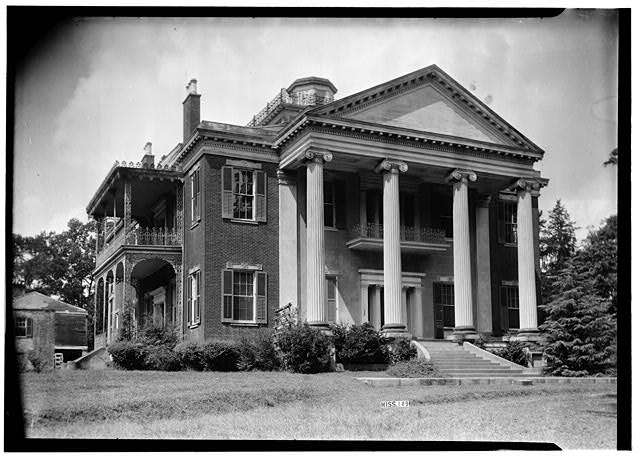
- Homewood Mansion in 1936

General information
- Status: Burnt down in 1940
- Type: Plantation house in the Southern United States
- Architectural style: Greek Revival architecture in North America
- Location: Natchez, Mississippi, U.S.
- Construction started: 1855
- Completed: 1860

Height
- Roof: Hipped

Technical details
- Floor count: Five

Design and construction
- Architect: James Hardie

Homewood is an historic estate in Natchez, Adams County, Mississippi. It was created beginning in 1855 as a wedding present for the Southern belle Catherine Hunt and her husband William S. Balfour on 600 acres given to the couple by Catherine's father David Hunt. The plantation house remained unscathed during the American Civil War of 1861-1865. By the early twentieth century, it was used as a shooting location for 1915 classic film The Birth of a Nation. The author Stark Young used Homewood as the setting of a wedding in his 1934 novel So Red the Rose (pages 414 and 415). The mansion burnt down in 1940.

== Location ==
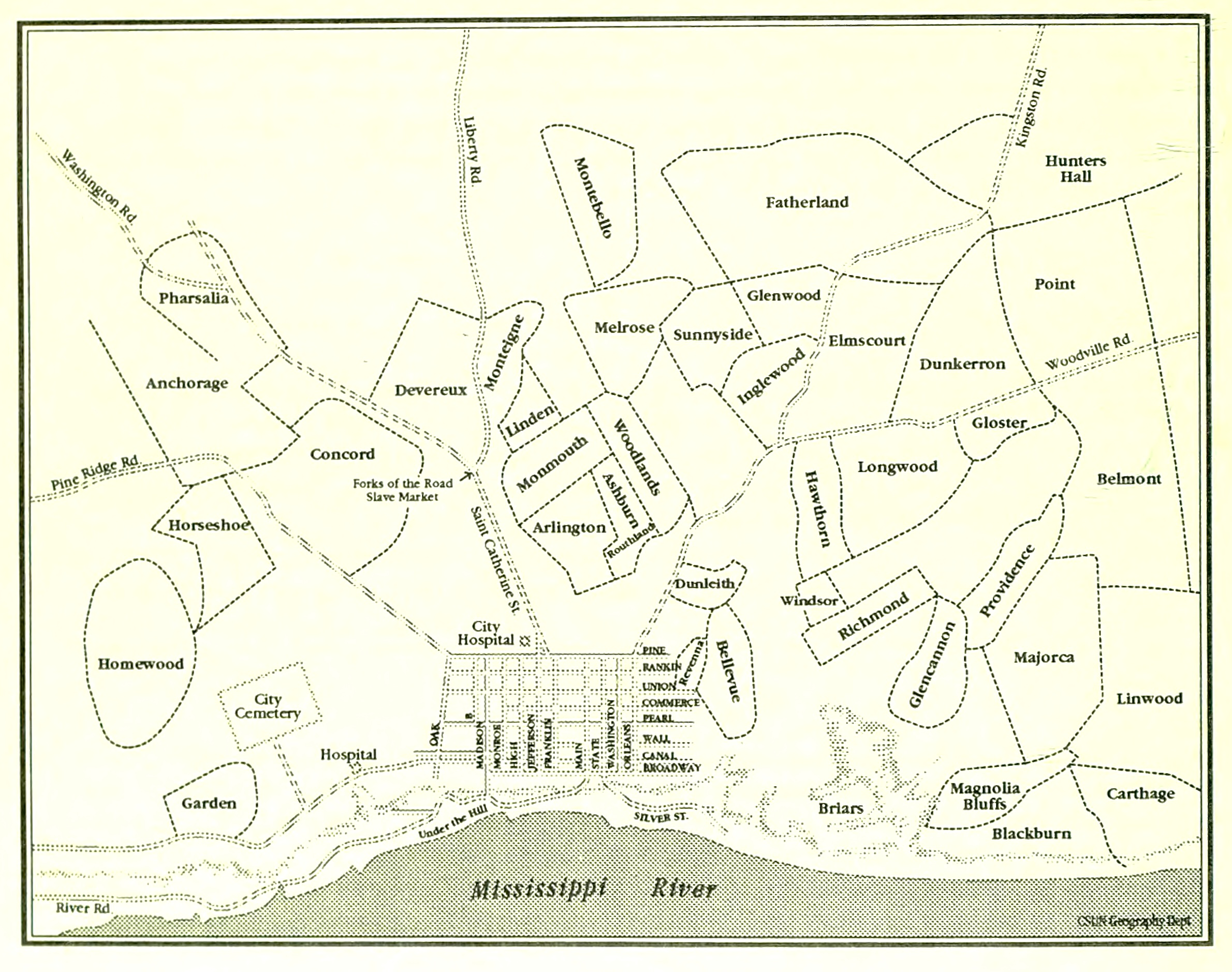
The Homewood Estate pictured in "Illustration F: Suburban Estates — c. 1830 to 1860" from The Black Experience in Natchez: 1720-1880, Special History Study by Ronald L. F. Davis (1993)

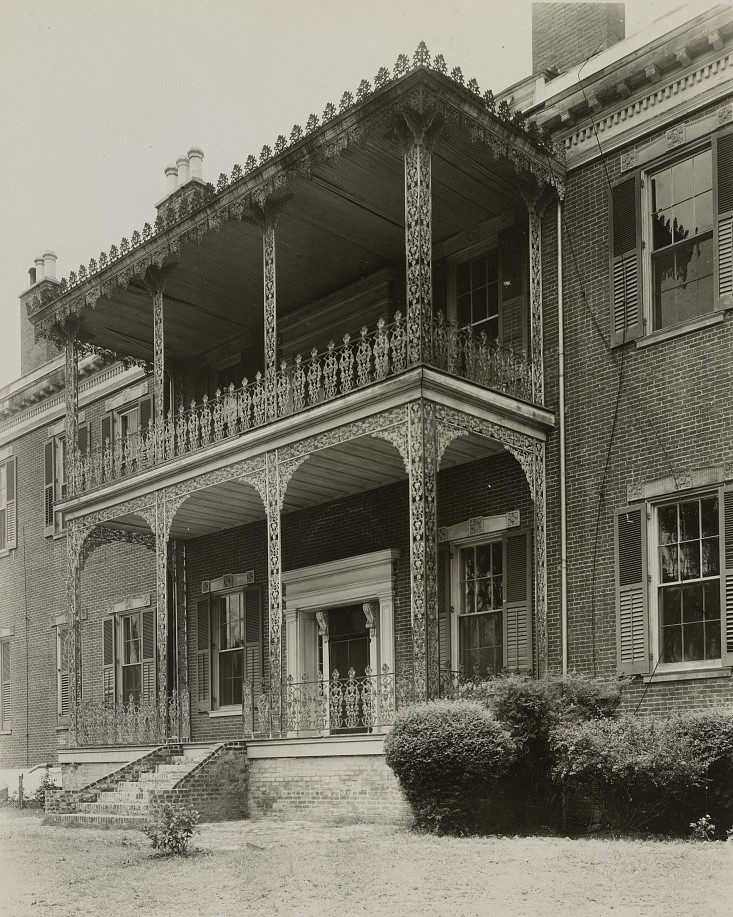
Side view of Homewood, by Frances Benjamin Johnston, 1938. It had a mahogany fanspread stairway. All the bricks were made on premises from clay when the lake was dug.

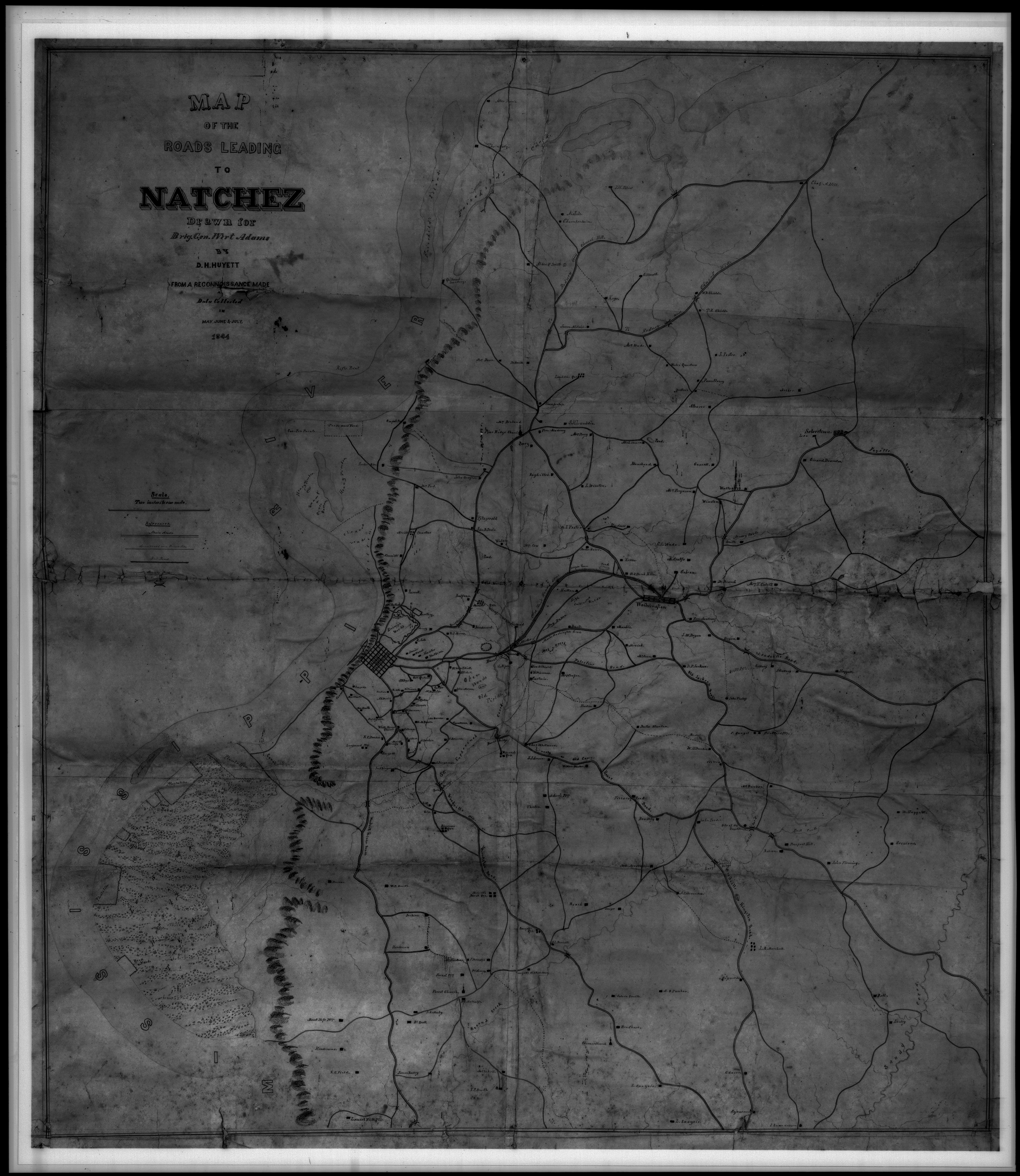
The name "Balfour" on this map - just above and to the right of the city of Natchez - is where Homewood is located.

Homewood is located north of the Natchez, Mississippi city limits on M.L. King, Jr. Road (formerly Pine Ridge Road).

== Antebellum History ==
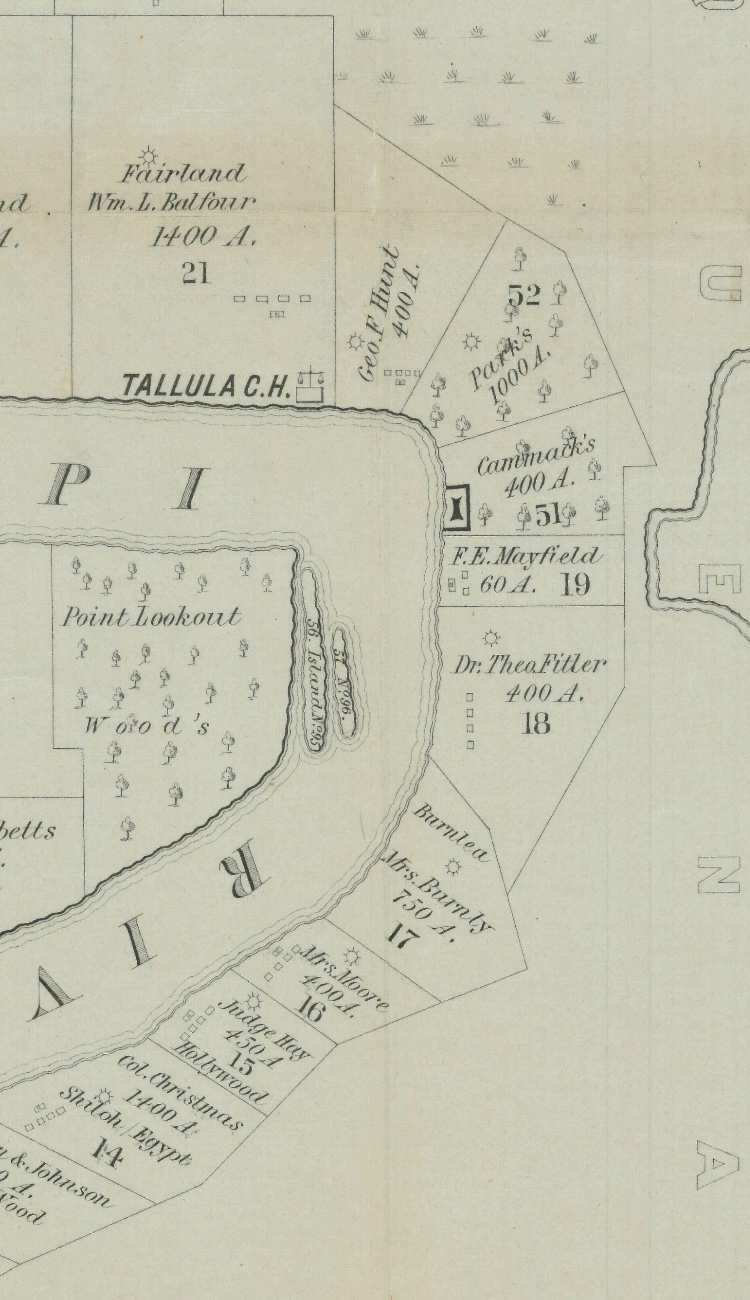
Fairland Plantation and George Hunt's Lockwood Plantation on a map prepared by the U.S. government between 1866 and 1874. Lockwood with only 16 enslaved was more of a rural retreat for George's family when they were checking on their Georgiana Plantation - just to the east on Deer Creek - which had 147 enslaved. George's home plantation was Huntley, which adjoined his father's Woodlawn Plantation in Jefferson County, Mississippi to the south.

Homewood was created beginning in 1855 as the antebellum hunting estate of William S. Balfour and his wife, Catherine Hunt. Because of the great wealth created by William and Catherine's parents plantations, the Balfours could afford to just use Homewood as a hunting estate before the Civil War, rather than needing it to be a profitable plantation. It adjoined Catherine's sister Charlotte's hunting estate, which was named Lansdowne. The 600 acre parcel of land for the Homewood Estate was a wedding gift to William and Catherine from Catherine's millionaire, planter father David Hunt. In the past the land had probably been part of the home plantation of Robert Dunbar. Dunbar was the patriarch of the rich, planter clan known as the country Dunbars - no relation to the city Dunbars who owned the Forrest Plantation. Robert Dunbar moved away to his Oakley Grove Plantation (at the site of the current Adams County Airport). The land for Homewood was eventually passed down through Dunbar's descendants to Catherine Hunt - the line being: Robert Dunbar; Jane (Dunbar) Ferguson, whose husband David's parents owned Mount Locust Plantation; Ann (Ferguson) Hunt - David Hunt's wife; and Catherine (Hunt) Balfour.

William S. Balfour's father, William L. Balfour of Madison County, Mississippi, was one of the richest Mississippi antebellum planters with several plantations. He was a founder of the Mississippi College at Clinton. James Buchanan had picked him to run as his vice-president in the 1857 presidential election; however, he died before the election. It appears that William S. was left out of his father William L. Balfour's will, because William S. had already been given the 1,400 acre Fairland Plantation in Issaquena County, Mississippi. Fairland would have provided the income needed to support the Homewood estate. William S. had 177 enslaved Africans in Issaquena County - probably all on Fairland Plantation - in 1860.

While the Homewood mansion was being built (1855-1860), William and Catherine lived on his Fairland Plantation in Issaquena County, Mississippi, where they could have socialized with Catherine's brother George F. Hunt's family when they sometimes stayed next door on George's Lockwood property. Fairland and Lockwood were located right on the banks of the Mississippi River near Tallalula, David Hunt's Wilderness Plantation (which briefly belonged to Catherine's brother Andrew before Andrew died at age 21) and George Hunt's Georgiana Plantation. As William and Catherine were from the very richest of the planter families, all of their grown siblings owned at least one large plantation, and sometimes more. Most of the boys, including William and George, had attended Oakland College. Thus, it meant a great deal financially to be born into the Balfour or Hunt family at that time.

The Balfours and their six children moved to Homewood in about 1860 with nine of their enslaved Africans. The enslaved would have been quartered in the basement rooms with fireplaces of the mansion (where a Gardener and other estate workers would have lived), the second floor of the kitchen building (where an enslaved cook, children's nurse, and sometimes a butler would live), and the second floor of the carriage house(for the stable hands). The Homewood real estate was valued at $50,000, and the personal property (which included the Homewood enslaved) was valued at $16,000 in 1860.

== Civil War and Postbellum History ==
During the American Civil War of 1861-1865, William served in the Confederate States Army as a Major, and Catherine left by carriage with her children for about one year, moving from place to place. The family returned after the war to find that Homewood was intact. Without the enslaved African labor from before the war, the Balfour's wealth began to decline. Generally, Catherine and her siblings used Cincinnati, Ohio real estate, inherited from her father David, mortgages on their plantations, and whatever else they had to support themselves after the war. Because it became almost impossible to run a plantation profitably after the Civil War, Fairland Plantation was probably soon foreclosed on or sold in the years after the War. The Balfours would have hung on at Homewood as long as they could by converting it from a hunting estate into a plantation with themselves and sharecroppers for the labor.

The Balfours sold Homewood to Mr. and Mrs. William J. Kaiser of Natchez in 1907. The Kaisers ran a dairy farm on the plantation. Some scenes from the 1915 film The Birth of a Nation were made on the grounds and porches of Homewood. Beginning in 1932 Homewood became well known, because it was on the annual Natchez Pilgrimage houses tour.

When their children were grown, the Kaisers sold the mansion and 73 acres in 1937 to Mr. and Mrs. Swan of New York, who had visited Homewood on a Pilgrimage tour, for $35,000. Mrs. Swan caused a lot of talk in Natchez. She and her husband, who was much younger, spent huge sums modernizing the mansion and expanding the gardens during the last years of the Great Depression. Their dogs slept on Beautyrest mattresses. The mansion caught fire in 1940. As it was burning to the ground, Mrs. Swan, with a bottle of whiskey in her hand, slowed the firemen's efforts by ordering them off the property. People speculated that the Swans intentionally burned the mansion. The Swans, however, collected $43,000 in damages from five insurance companies as a result of the fire and returned to live in New York. The old antebellum kitchen dependency building, which survived the fire, has been remodeled for use as a residence. The plantation was later sold to William D. Meriwether, Sarah J. Meriwether, and their children. The old carriage house, which also survived the fire, has been a residence and a clubhouse for the Natchez Country Club.

== Architecture ==
The Homewood mansion was about 72 by 96 feet. It was the suburban Natchez equal of nearby Stanton Hall, which was in the town of Natchez. The mansion, designed by Scottish architect James Hardie, took the five years from 1855 to 1860 to build. It had five floors. The basement had several rooms with fireplaces. The first floor had six rooms. The first floor rooms were divided by a center hall and a cross hall that ran just behind the two front rooms. The library, front portion of the center hall, and the parlor could be combined into a 72 foot long ballroom, when the large solid mahogany pocket doors connecting them were opened, that stretched across the front of the house. The second floor had a similar floor plan to the first floor. The attic floor had a large center room surrounded by eight small storage rooms. From the cupola and the adjoining widow's walk on top of the mansion, the town of Natchez could be seen in the distance.

The mansion had two and one-half foot thick brick walls and thirty-five foot high, metal front porch columns with Ionic capitals. The sidelight windows beside the front door had imported pink glass from Belgium (flecks of gold in such glass made it glow from the light inside the house at night, so people could find the front door from a distance). Both sides of the mansion had two-story porches with metal lace-work railings. The imported marble fireplace mantles varied in color. The library mantle was pink and grey. The drawing room mantle was white. The dining room mantle was pink with oxblood. Each of the eight bedrooms had different shadings. The interior doors were made of three inch thick mahogany. A curved stairway with fan shaped steps and a black walnut railing was in the rear of the central hall and connected the first, second and attic floors. A spiral staircase rose from the large center room of the attic to the cupola on top.

A two-story kitchen flanked a rear corner of the mansion. The grounds also contained a two-story carriage house made of brick.

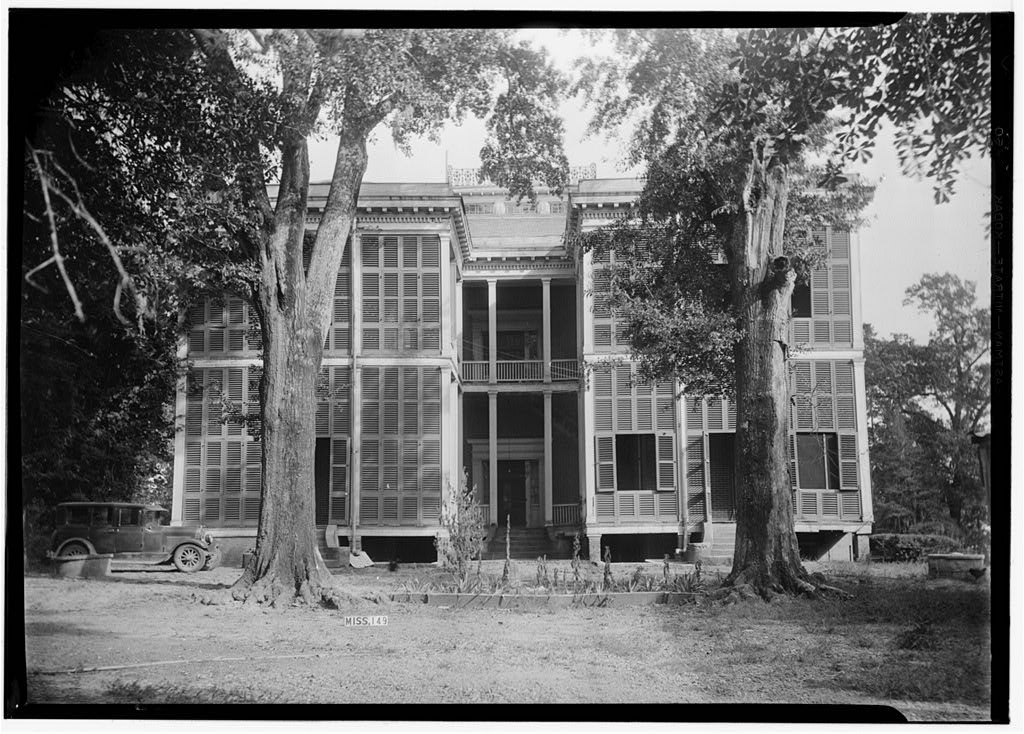
Rear of Homewood Mansion (1936)

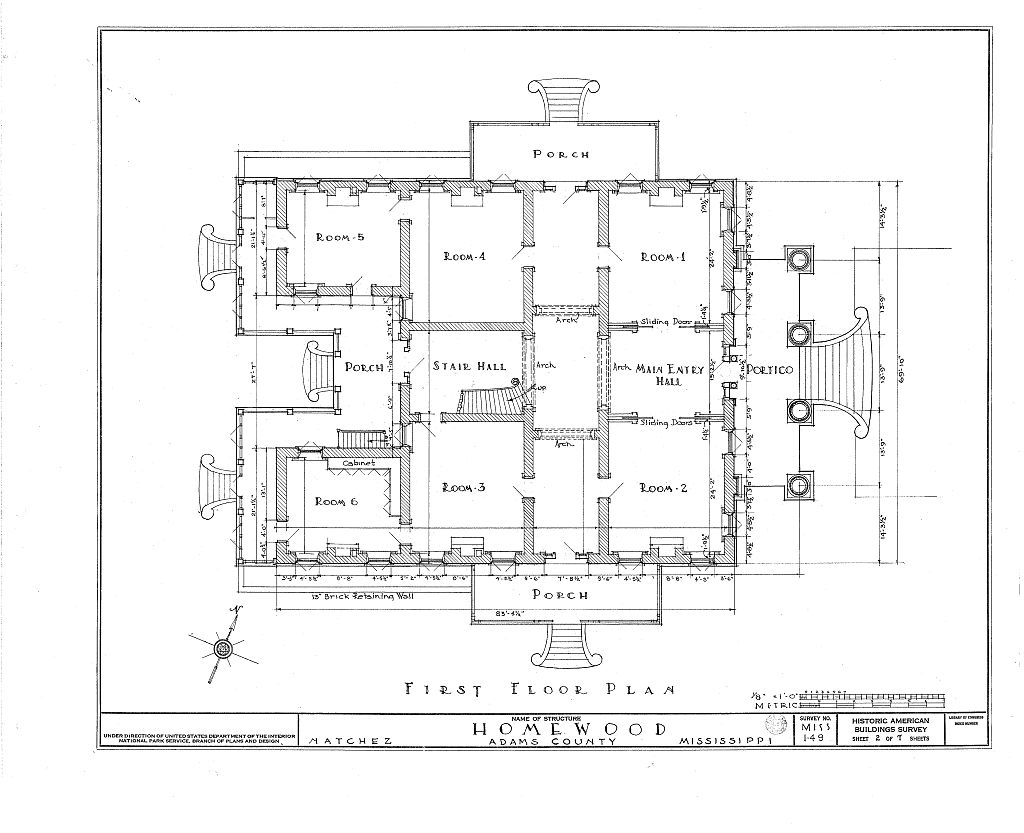
Floor Plan of the First Floor of Homewood Mansion

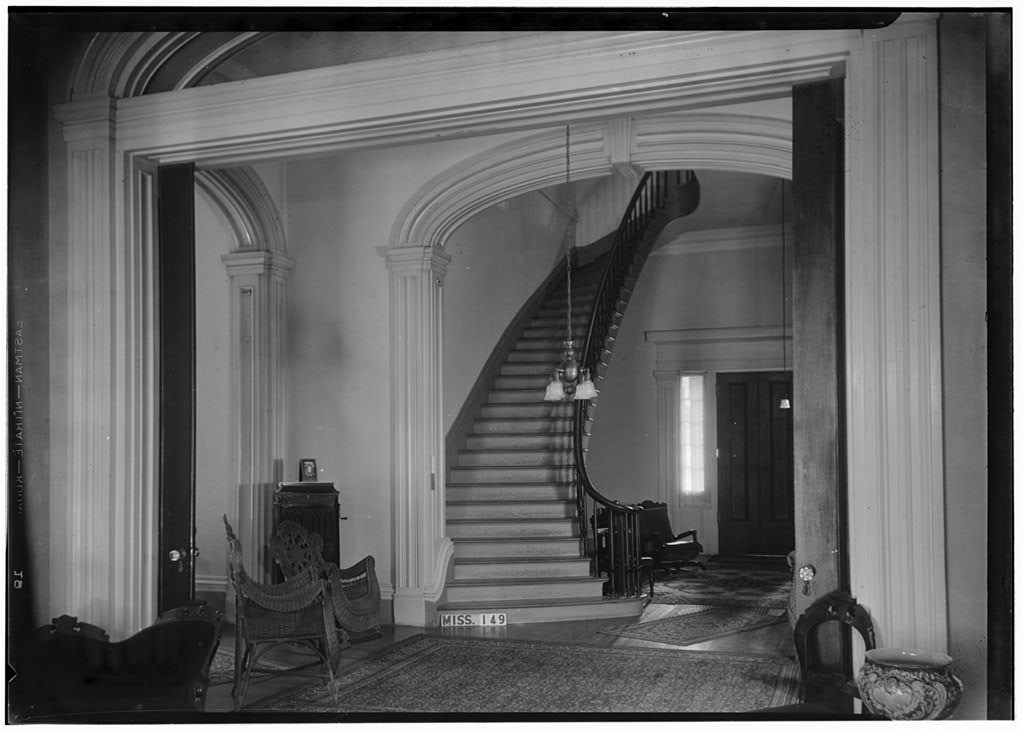
First Floor Center Hall of Homewood Mansion (1936)

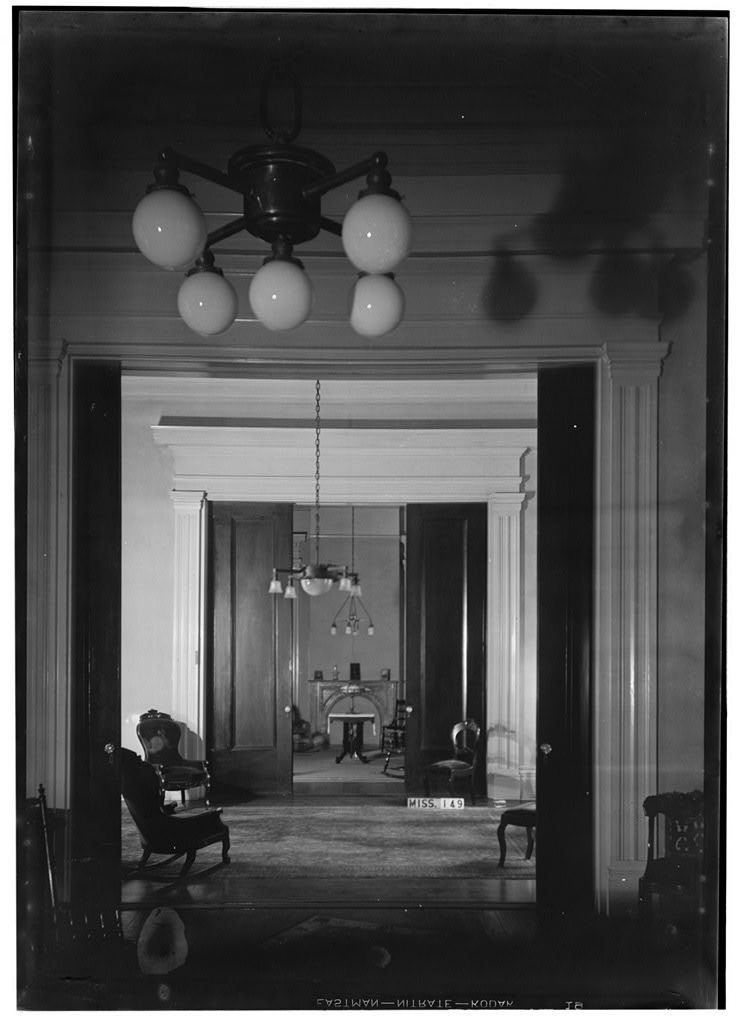
Rooms Across the Front of Homewood Mansion on the First Floor (1936), which were the library, front entrance hall and parlor. They were opened up by pocket doors to form a ballroom.

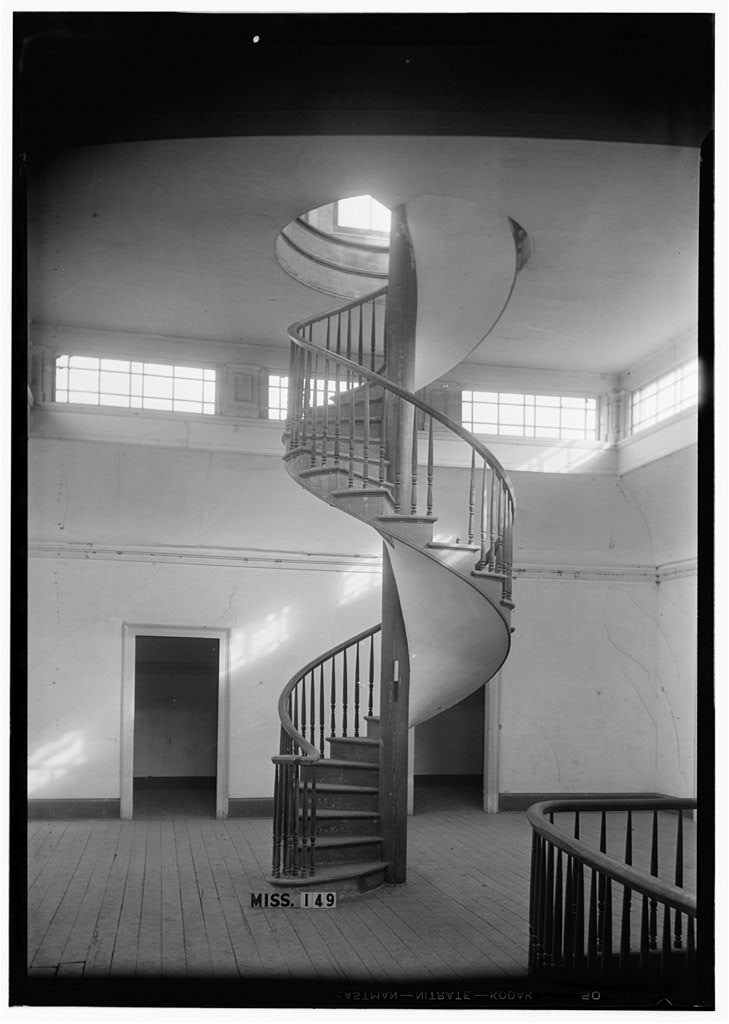
Spiral Stairway (attic to cupola) in Homewood Mansion (1936)

== See also ==
- Lansdowne (Natchez, Mississippi)
- Woodlawn Plantation (Jefferson County, Mississippi)
- David Hunt (planter)
- Abijah Hunt
- List of plantations in Mississippi
- List of the oldest buildings in Mississippi
- Twelve Years a Slave
- Plantation complexes in the Southern United States
- African-American history
- American gentry
- Atlantic slave trade
- Casa-Grande & Senzala (similar concept in Brazilian plantations)
- History of the Southern United States
- Journal of a Residence on a Georgian Plantation in 1838–1839
- List of plantations in the United States
- Lost Cause of the Confederacy
- Plain Folk of the Old South (1949 book by historian Frank Lawrence Owsley)
- Plantation-era songs
- Plantation house
- Plantation tradition (genre of literature)
- Plantations of Leon County (Florida)
- Planter class
- Sharecropping in the United States
- Slavery at Tuckahoe plantation
- Slavery in the United States
- Treatment of slaves in the United States
- White supremacy
- Commons:Category:Old maps of plantations in the United States
