= Abijah Hunt =

American planter and slave trader (1762–1811)

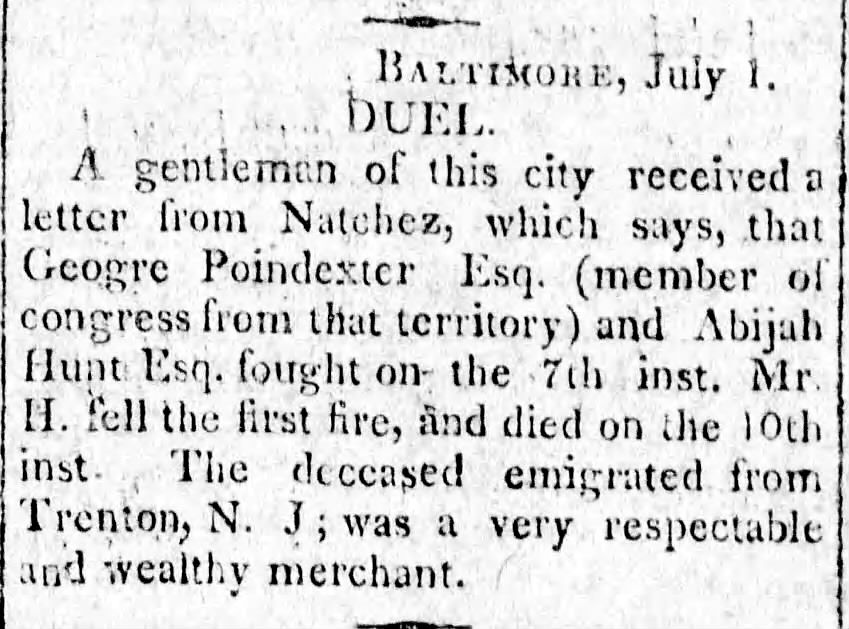
- "Duel" Lancaster Intelligencer, July 19, 1811
- Born: 1762; New Jersey
- Died: June 11, 1811 (aged 48–49); Mississippi Territory
- Cause of death: Shot in a duel
- Occupations: Merchant, planter, slave trader, banker
- Political party: Federalist party
- Relatives: John Wesley Hunt (cousin); David Hunt (nephew)

Abijah Hunt (1762–1811) was an American merchant, planter, slave trader, and banker in the Natchez District. He was killed in a duel with George Poindexter in 1811.

== Early life ==
Abijah Hunt was born in 1762 in New Jersey. Two of his brothers were Jeremiah Hunt and Jesse Hunt.

== Career ==
Abijah moved from New Jersey to Cincinnati, Ohio to work as a merchant supplying the United States Army soldiers stationed at Fort Washington there. He worked with his brothers (Jeremiah and Jesse), buying goods on credit in Philadelphia and New York City. Wagoners hauled the goods to Pittsburgh, Pennsylvania where they were loaded onto flatboats and floated down the Ohio River to be sold in Cincinnati. He made a small fortune providing supplies to the soldiers in Cincinnati. Land records show that Abijah bought land around Cincinnati during his time there. Abijah's nephew David Hunt presumably inherited this land, passing on his Cincinnati investments to his children upon his death.

In 1795 Abijah helped his cousin, John Wesley Hunt, set up a similar merchant business in nearby Lexington, Kentucky. The Hunts obtained some of their goods by trading with each other. John would send Abijah "bacon, butter, cheese, salt, tobacco, whiskey, and horses" from Lexington, while Abijah would send John "leather, shoes, and nails" from Cincinnati.

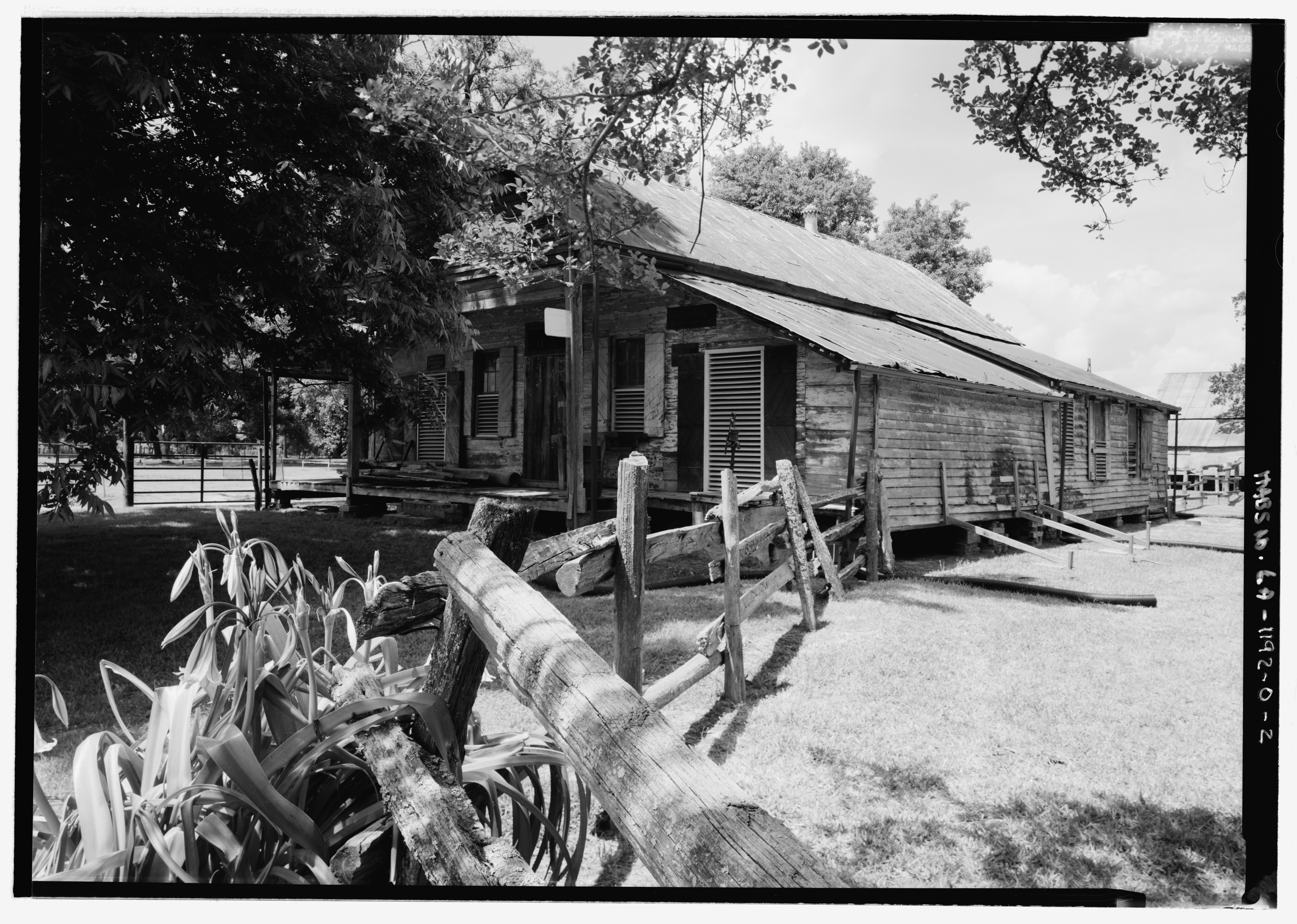
View looking northeast to southwest from roadside fence to store - Oakland Plantation, Plantation Store and Post Office, Route 494, Bermuda, Natchitoches Parish, LA HABS LA,35-BERM,2-O-2. This old store is similar to how Abijah Hunt's stores would have looked. They were possibly made of logs, similar to a log cabin in these pioneering days.

In 1798, Abijah moved to the Natchez District of Mississippi. He reportedly built the first cotton gin in Greenville around 1808, which was in active use until 1848. He invested some of his money in land, developing cotton plantations in Adams, Jefferson and Claiborne counties. He also developed a profitable slave-trading business with John, Jeremiah, and Jesse Hunt beginning in 1800. John would ship the slaves from Kentucky to Mississippi, where Abijah predicted he could get an average of $500 for them (versus about $300 in Kentucky).

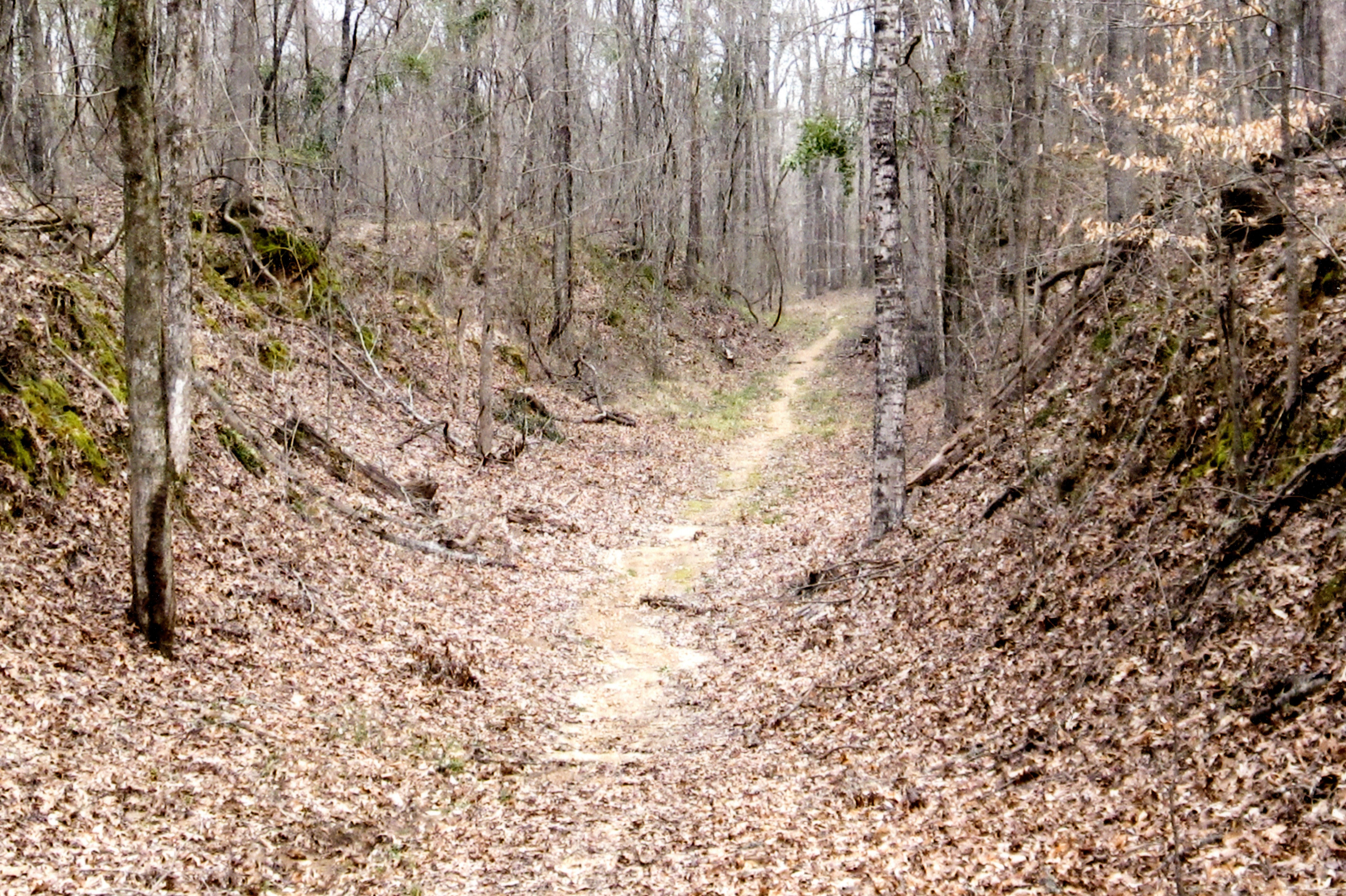
Old Natchez Trace leading to the Grindstone Ford

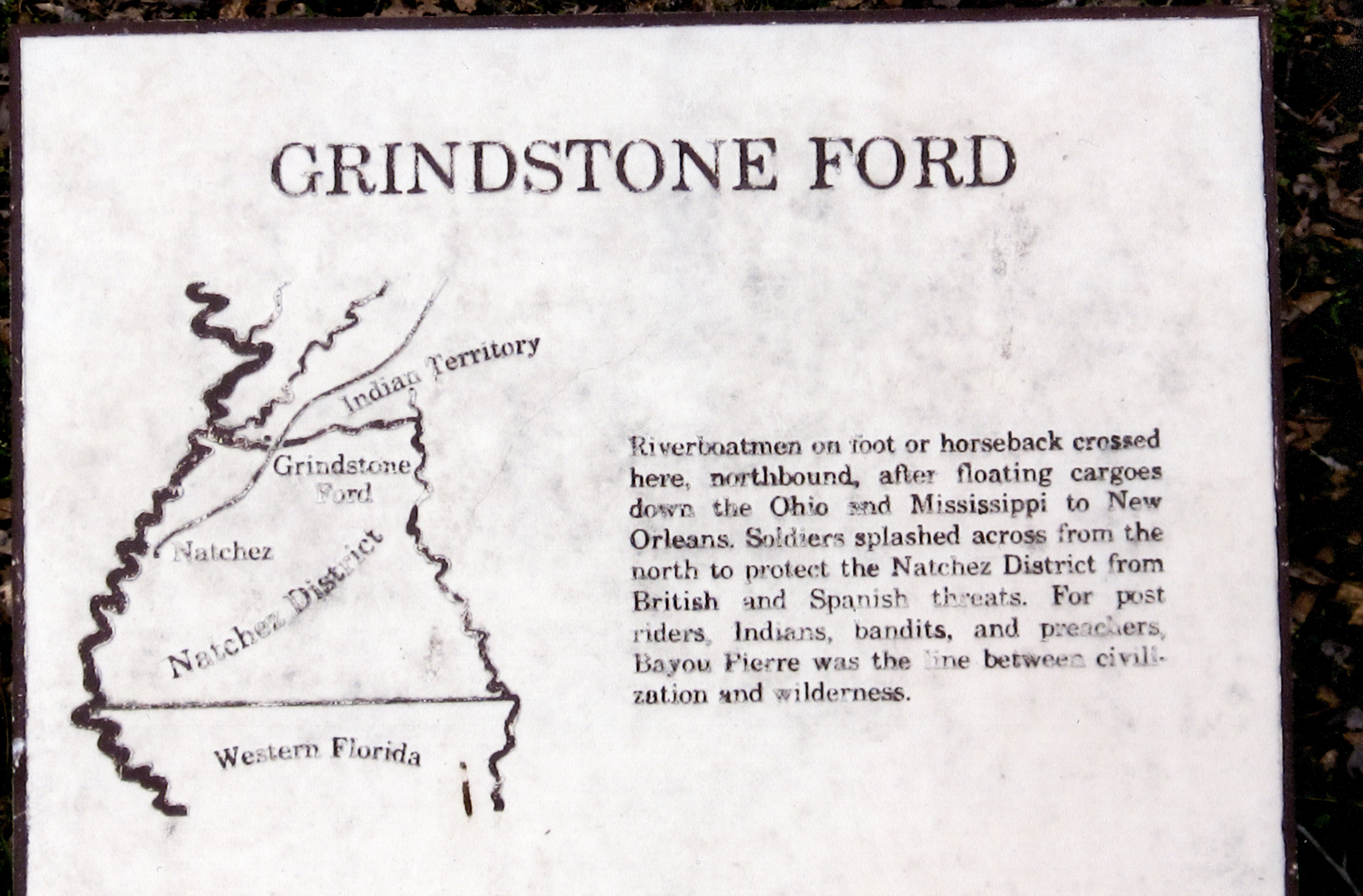
Sign along the Natchez Trace Parkway

With Elijah Smith, Abijah opened general stores and public cotton gins in Natchez, Washington, Greenville, Port Gibson, Big Black, and at the Grindstone Ford. By 1805, Hunt was the largest merchant in Mississippi. Hunt and Smith charged a ten percent commission to planters for processing their cotton at his public cotton gins. Additionally, the Hunt and Smith firm operated a cotton brokerage and transported logs and cotton bales to market. Thus, Abijah created a kind of vertical monopoly, making a profit in every area of the cotton business: growing it on his plantations, processing it at his public cotton gins, and selling it through his brokerage.

Hunt was involved in other business enterprises. In 1799, Abijah was appointed as deputy U.S. postmaster of the Mississippi Territory. In this capacity, he made sure that all mail from Natchez would reach Nashville, Tennessee. In 1800 Governor Winthrop Sargent issued a notice to Indian agents in the Chickasaw lands that "specially requested to afford unto the post riders of Mr. Abijah Hunt (who has contracted to carry the mail from Natchez to Knoxville) all the aid and protection in their power consistent with their general duty and instructions...February 28, 1800."

Abijah Hunt sold a couple of his plantations. In 1807, Winthrop Sargent bought Bellevue Plantation in Adams County from Hunt and renamed it Gloucester. In 1808, Hunt sold a plantation on the Bayou Pierre in Claiborne County, complete with 60 or 61 slaves. In 1809, he was a co-founder of the Bank of Mississippi. He was business partners with William Gordon Forman, of the firm Forman, Hunt & Co., at the time of his death.

Abijah lived in Greenville (now defunct) on the Old Natchez Trace in Jefferson County. Politically, he was a Federalist, of "high standing". He hired his nephew, David Hunt, also from New Jersey, to work in his Greenville store—soon promoting him to run all of his stores. A Jefferson County local historian lionized Abijah in an article published in the 1880s, writing that Abijah and David Hunt "controlled most of the business of [Old Greenville] and surroundings. They had stores from Natchez to the Grindstone Ford along the Old Natchez Trace for the accommodation of the people. In 1807, while there was an embargo on different articles of prime necessity to our people, particularly cotton cards, Abijah Hunt, with his great foresight, sent to England and had 300 pair shipped to him here. Those cards were given away to the different settlers who had none. This was characteristic of the man, and has been so of the family ever since. Abijah Hunt was greatly loved by the whole people. Hunt had the misfortune, in 1811, to fight a duel with Gov. Poindexter, and was killed. Thus passed away one of our most noble and enterprising men, and one who had done what few would or could dare to do."

One 20th-century feature article written to market the Natchez Pilgrimage, claimed, perhaps dubiously, that Hunt had owned 1,700 slaves.

== Death ==
The duel reportedly took place at the Vidalia sandbar. Some detail about the duel that killed Hunt comes from a letter written by Thomas A. Claiborne to Andrew Jackson. Claiborne served as surgeon on Poindexter's side. He reported:

During the late election contest; the most violent struggle was made to prevent the reelection of [George] Poindexter Esquire, as our representative in the Congress of the United States. The means imployed by the federalists, were deemed by mr Poindexter to be of a personal nature highly indecorous and insulting to his feelings. Among those who were most active and vigilant in the circulation of hand bills, to promote the views of the federal party and the election of Robert Williams, was Abijah Hunt Esquire merchant of Natchez. The Election resulted in favour of mr Poindexter by a majority of 1346 Votes. This part of the drama, was followed by an immediate demand, of Mr Hunt to come to an eclaircissement on the field of honor, with mr Poindexter for the personal injuries and insults which he believed he had sustained from mr Hunt, during the canvass. The invitation was accepted, and the parties met on the western margin of the mississippi on Friday the 7th. Instanc. Wm C Mead Esq late an officer in the army of the United States and Lieutenant James Peyton were the friends of mr Poindexter and I at his particular request attended him as surgeon. E Bradish and Elijah Smith Esquires were the friends of mr Hunt and Doctor Duncan attended him in the charecter of surgeon. At four oclock [ mut. ] the parties took their posts, at the distance of ten paces, and at the first exchange of fire; mr Hunt received the Ball of his Antagonist through the Abdomen of which wound he expired, on the Sunday Evening following. It is due to mr Poindexter to remark, that from the commencement to the close of this unfortunate affair, he behaved with the greatest coolness and composure, and observed the strictest attention to etiquette and the principles of honor. . . . .

Hunt died June 9 or June 11, 1811, at the age of 49, two or three days after he was shot during a duel with Democratic Republican opponent George Poindexter. The latter went on to have a successful political career, serving as Governor of Mississippi. The inventory of Abijah's estate listed his 60 slaves by name, which were divided into two plantation groupings in Jefferson and Claiborne Counties. His trustees were Jeremiah Hunt and David Hunt.

Hunt's nephew, David Hunt, inherited his land and his uncle's share of his businesses, but not his personal property (slaves, plantation equipment, livestock, household furnishings, etc.). He bought out his Uncle's other partners, and acquired probably all of his uncle's personal property as well. David gradually built this inheritance into his own much larger inventory of plantations centered on his home at Woodlawn Plantation, which adjoined Abijah's Huntley Plantation—inherited by David. David and his children eventually owned many plantations.

== See also ==
- List of duels in the United States

== See also ==
- Lansdowne (Natchez, Mississippi)
- Homewood Plantation (Natchez, Mississippi)
- Woodlawn Plantation (Jefferson County, Mississippi)
- David Hunt (planter)
- List of plantations in Mississippi
- List of the oldest buildings in Mississippi
- Twelve Years a Slave
- Plantation complexes in the Southern United States
- African-American history
- American gentry
- Atlantic slave trade
- Casa-Grande & Senzala (similar concept in Brazilian plantations)
- History of the Southern United States
- Journal of a Residence on a Georgian Plantation in 1838–1839
- List of plantations in the United States
- Lost Cause of the Confederacy
- Plain Folk of the Old South (1949 book by historian Frank Lawrence Owsley)
- Plantation-era songs
- Plantation house
- Plantation tradition (genre of literature)
- Plantations of Leon County (Florida)
- Planter class
- Sharecropping in the United States
- Slavery at Tuckahoe plantation
- Slavery in the United States
- Treatment of slaves in the United States
- White supremacy
- Commons:Category:Old maps of plantations in the United States
