= William Gordon Forman =

American landowner and politician (1770–1812)

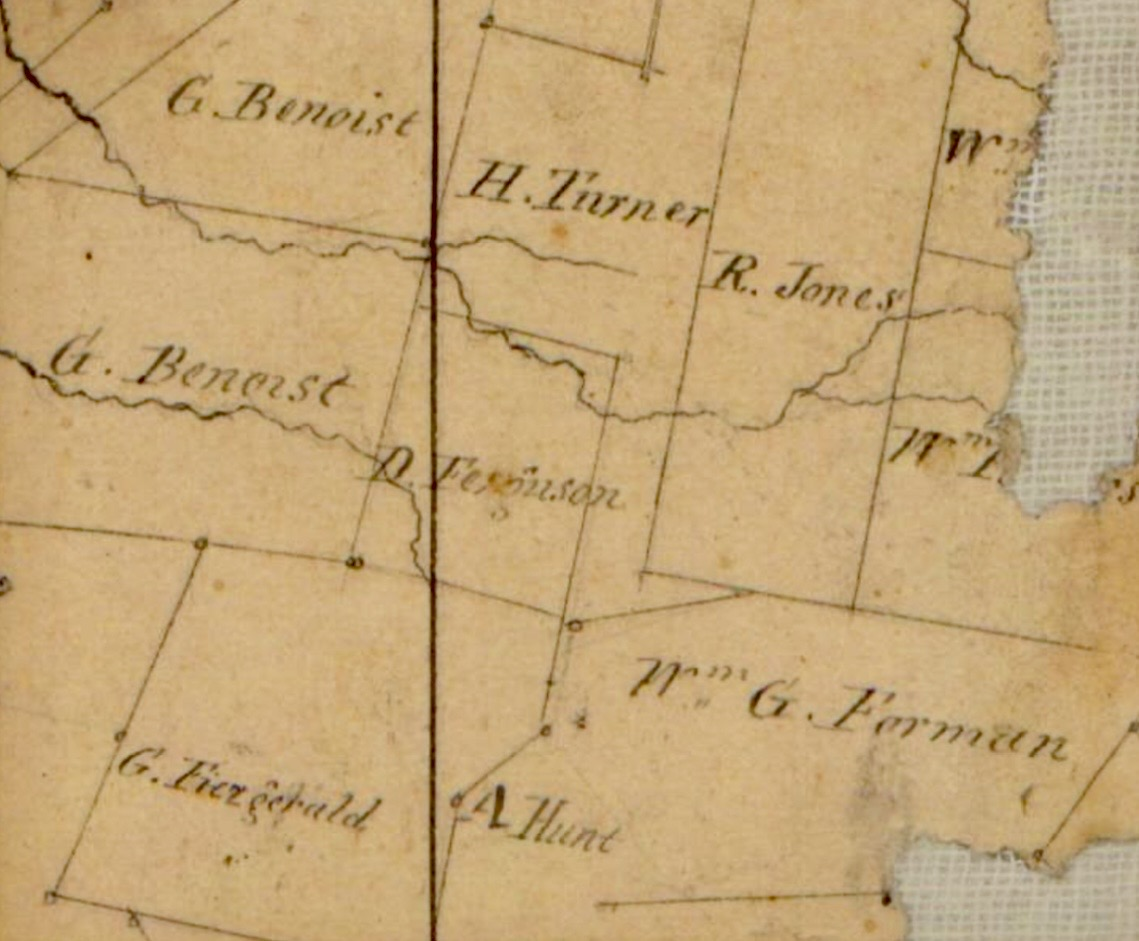
- Property of William Gordon Forman and stand of Abijah Hunt in Adams County, 1810
- Born: June 22, 1770; New Jersey, U.S.
- Died: October 6, 1812 (aged 42); Lexington, Kentucky, U.S.
- Occupations: Lawyer; merchant; planter; politician

William Gordon Forman (June 22, 1770 – October 6, 1812) was an American lawyer, landowner, merchant, planter, and politician. A Princeton-educated lawyer, he immigrated to the Natchez District of Mississippi Territory around 1800 to take control of land granted his father and uncle/father-in-law. He served as Speaker of the Territorial House of Representatives in 1803. He was business partners with Abijah Hunt and other Hunts, and with his own brother Joseph Forman, in a wide range of business enterprises including shipping, mercantile enterprises, and cotton planting and ginning. He died in Kentucky in 1812 while traveling to New Jersey with his four-year-old daughter. His estate was heavily indebted and remained in litigation for decades.

== Biography ==
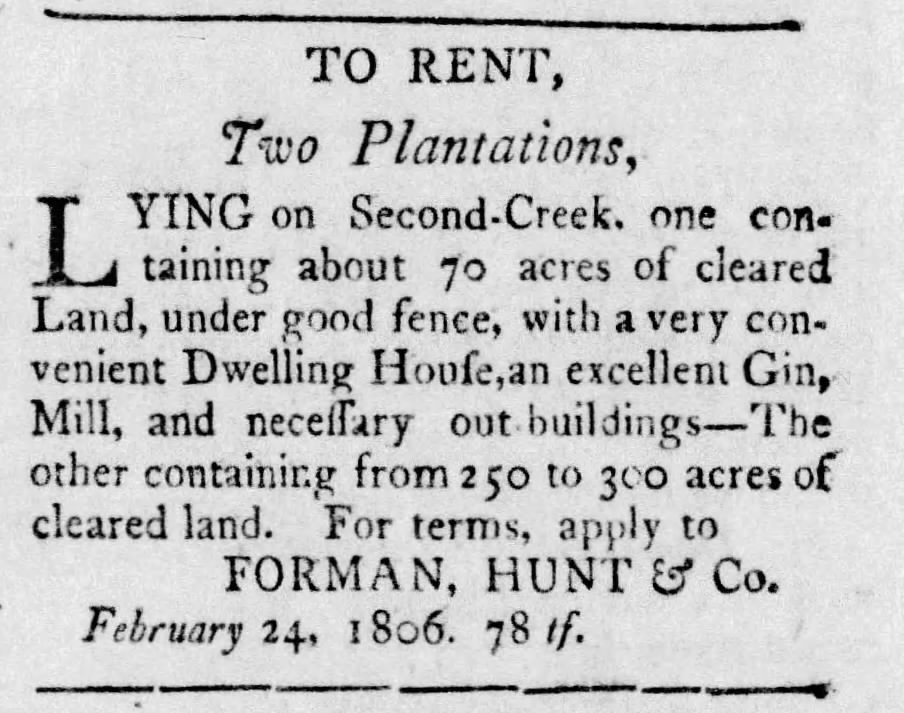
Plantations listed for sale by Forman, Hunt & Co. (February 24, 1806)

Forman was originally from Shrewsbury, New Jersey, in Monmouth County. Forman was a graduate of Princeton University, class of 1786. He became a lawyer. He married a cousin and around 1800 he migrated to the Natchez District of Mississippi to claim his father-in-law's property. (Circa 1790, "Ezekiel Forman and his family, sixty slaves belonging to David Forman, David's overseer Benjamin Osmun, and Samuel S. Forman, a young cousin" traveled south to Mississippi to claim lands granted by Diego de Gardoquí.)

According to a Forman family genealogy book, "Miss A. M. Woodhull, who was a niece of Major W. G. Forman's second wife, writes that he 'introduced Eli Whitney's celebrated cotton-gin into the state of Mississippi. He had previously gone abroad, and was the first private American gentleman presented at the Court of George the Third. We have part of his costume worn on that occasion'."

Forman was owner or part owner in a number of ships that served the port of New Orleans, including the three-masted Augusta built at Sag Harbor in 1799, sailed to Fort Adams, Mississippi in 1803 and New Orleans in 1804. He was also a co-owner of the two-deck, three-mast Penelope, built at Salisbury, Massachusetts in 1793. His partners, fellow merchants of Natchez, were Abijah Hunt, Elijah Smith, Joseph Forman, Henry Hunt, and John McCann. The ship made at least three voyages to New Orleans in 1807 and 1808.

W. G. Forman served in the Mississippi territorial assembly in 1803, where he was elected Speaker of the territorial house that met at Washington, M.T. He was a resident of Adams County, Mississippi Territory circa 1805. Circa 1808 he was business partners with merchant and slave trader Abijah Hunt, shortly killed in a duel with George Poindexter. In 1809 he and Henry Hunt were named parties in a case before the Adams County court.

As of 1812 he was a director of the Bank of Mississippi, capitalized at $500,000, along with Stephen Minor, Ferdinand Claiborne, Samuel Postlethwaite, Wm. Brooks, John Hankerson, Lyman Harding, Jeremiah Hunt, Lewis Evans, Jas. McIntosh, Thos. Wilkins, and Jas. C. Wilkins.

== Death ==
Forman died in Lexington, Kentucky in 1812. According to some accounts, Forman was killed by bandits. The Forman history stated, "After his second wife's death, Major W. G. Forman started north with his little daughter to bring her to her grandfather's, Dr. Woodhull's, in Monmouth, and was murdered at Lexington, Ky., it is supposed for purposes of robbery, by negroes or men in the house where he was stopping." A New Jersey account claims, "Reaching Louisville, Kentucky, he was stabbed to death in his bedroom at the Galt House by negroes, who hoped to find a sum of money on his person. His fortune was in script [scrip? or promissory notes?], and proved useless to his murderers." Other accounts attribute his death to an apoplectic fit. Litigation on his heavily indebted estate continued until 1834.

== Personal life ==
Forman married first a cousin, Sarah Marsh Forman, daughter of Continental Army officer David Forman. Following her death, in September 2, 1806, at Burlington, New Jersey, he married Sarah Woodhull of New Jersey. According to a history of New Jersey, "Among the belles of Freehold at the beginning of the last century the name of Sarah Woodhull is prominent...[she] brought him a large fortune." Sarah Woodhull Forman was accompanied to Natchez by "Sabra, her black mammy, which [was] a great comfort." Sarah Woodhull Forman died in the Natchez District on November 13, 1811.

Forman is traditionally referred to as Major Forman but this may have been purely honorfic, as per the Southern usage of colonel, or it may have been a local militia rank. He apparently did not serve in the regular U.S. Army.

Circa 1902, painted portraits of William Gordon Forman and Sarah Woodhull Forman were in the possession of Mrs. Alice Forman, of Freehold, New Jersey.

== Sources ==
- Craven, Wesley Frank; Woodward, Ruth L., eds. (2014) [1991]. Princetonians: A Biographical Dictionary. Vol. IV: 1784–1790. Princeton, New Jersey: Princeton University Press. pp. 113–117. ISBN 9781400861262. LCCN 81047074. OCLC 899261488. Project MUSE book 34881.
- Dandridge, A. Spottswood; Dismukes, A. Elizabeth Forman (1903). The Forman Genealogy. Cleveland, Ohio: The Forman-Bassett-Hatch Co.
- Mills, W. Jay (1902). Historic Houses of New Jersey. Philadelphia: J.B. Lippincott. LCCN 2021771953. OCLC 1916164.
- U.S. Survey of Federal Archives (August 1941). Ship Registers and Enrollments of New Orleans, Louisiana. Vol. I: 1804–1820. WPA Historical Records Survey. Louisiana State University.
