= Ralph Hunt (colonist) =

American colonist (1613–1676)

Ralph Hunt was a founding colonist of what is today known as Long Island.

== Biography ==
Ralph Hunt was an early colonist in Long Island, New York and was an early leader in Middleburgh, where he served as a magistrate, freeholder, and later a Lieutenant for the British Crown. During this time he also negotiated the sale of Middleburg from the local Indian tribes. Colonial sources record his marriage to Elizabeth Jessup. During the British takeover of New York, Ralph Hunt raised a force against the Dutch and showed his support of a British government. When the Dutch left New York, he surveyed for the new town. His descendants moved to New Jersey and eventually the whole nation. He had six children. (Ann Hunt, Edward Hunt, Mary Hunt, Ralph Hunt Jr, John Hunt, & Samuel Hunt)
