= William St. John Elliot =

American plantation owner (1800–1855)

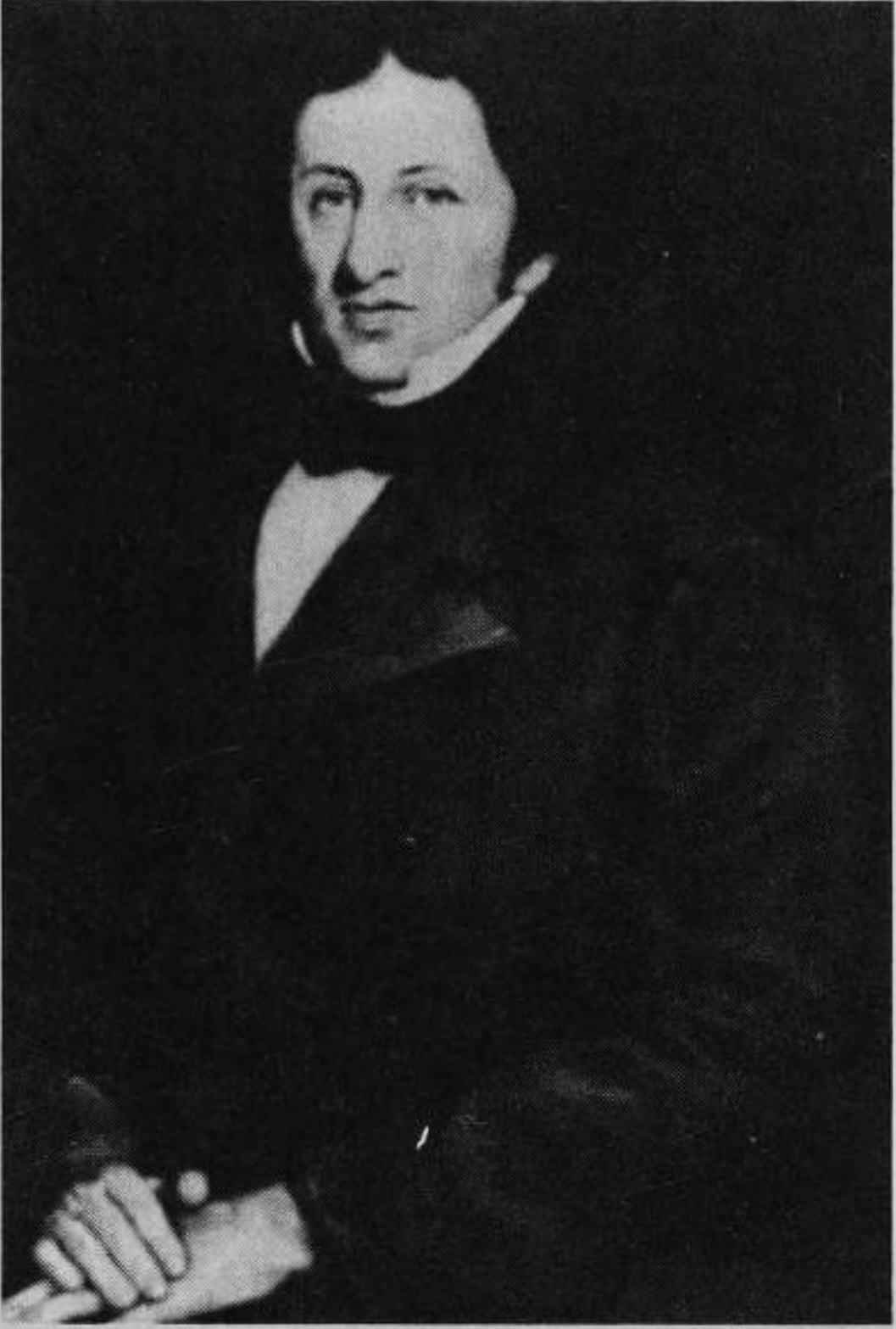
- William St. John Elliot (1800–1855) of D'Evereux, Natchez, Mississippi
- Born: September 25, 1800; Maryland
- Died: June 6, 1855 (aged 54); Near Florence, Alabama
- Spouse: Anna F. Elliot

William St. John Elliot (September 25, 1800 – June 6, 1855) was a businessman of the antebellum United States who owned cotton plantations in Adams County and Wilkinson County, Mississippi, Tensas Parish, Louisiana, and Concordia Parish, Louisiana. He enslaved a large number of people (at least 405 at his death in 1855), and he was described at the time of his death as one of the "wealthiest and most estimable planters" in the region. He was politically a Whig and a Unionist, and by religion a Roman Catholic, and he left a bequest for the establishment of a Catholic orphanage in his will. Considered one of the region's Natchez nabob class, he lived at the Greek Revival suburban estate D'Evereux.

== Biography ==
Elliot was born in the U.S. state of Maryland. His father was a doctor who settled near Port Gibson, Mississippi. Predominantly a cotton planter, Elliot also raised livestock. Elliot was also president of the cotton insurance business, Natchez Protection Insurance Company, which was organized in 1829. This was "the state's principal insurance firm." The company specialized in insuring cotton during the period between when it was ginned and when it was sold at New Orleans. Stockholders included Levin Marshall, John Hutchins, and Oren Metcalfe. In October 1830, cotton and a gin owned by Elliot in Wilkinson County were burned up in a fire; he lost 150 bales of cotton, total loss US$17,000 (equivalent to $513,984 in 2025).

In the 1830s, he was an officer of the Mississippi Colonization Society, which sought to eventually deport the region's enslaved African-Americans to Africa and sponsored a settlement in what became Liberia that was called Mississippi-in-Africa. In 1832 he advertised in the Richmond Whig newspaper that "I wish to purchase 200 NEGROES, in families, for which I will pay a liberal price, in cash. Many persons object to selling to traders—therefore I state the fact, that, I am purchasing for my own use; and for any further inquiry, I refer to the Hon. Wm. S. Archer, and Mr. Jas. H. Lynch, at the Coffee House in Richmond, where I may be found for the next ten days."

In 1834 he organized a public meeting to discuss the financial consequences of Andrew Jackson's Bank War and removal of deposits. In 1836 he was listed a reference for a hemp bagging company that marketed a sturdy product to cotton planters. The following year he complained to a vendor about the quality of "negro cloth" purchased for his slaves, placing an annual order for garments made "of a material that I trust will last better than the goods sent last winter." In 1837 the Ferridays were marketing "large and heavy" steam-powered gin stands like those ordered by P. M. Lapice and William St. John Elliot. He bought Saragossa plantation from Stephen Duncan in 1835, and then sold it to an in-law, William Conner, in 1849, and then bought it back in 1852, with enslaved people traded at the time of each turnover. In 1845 the people enslaved at Saragossa produced an early crop of cotton.

In partnership with other local planters of Catholic faith, including Henry Chotard and John Nevitt, he lobbied for the establishment of a diocese of Natchez, which was established in 1837 although the first priest did not arrive until 1841. In 1839 he was elected a trustee of the Roman Catholic Church of Natchez. As told by one 20th-century history of Natchez, "Unlike some Natchez planters, unrenowned for their piety, William St. John Elliot was very active in local church affairs. He was a strong supporter and financial contributor to the Natchez Roman Catholic Society."

He was on a local Whig Party nominating committee in July 1839. He hosted a ball at D'Evereux in 1840 for politician Henry Clay. Clay was considered "an intimate" of William St. John Elliot. Clay also stayed at his house in Natchez in 1845, and spent two months at William N. Mercer's house in New Orleans on the same trip.

By the 1840s Elliot was involved in breeding Ayrshire dairy cattle in partnership with Dr. Asa B. Metcalf "and their work made these thoroughbreds popular as milk producers with planters of Southwestern Mississippi." He participated in fundraising for the "poor of Ireland" during the Great Famine. As an anti-Jacksonian Whig, he opposed U.S. president James K. Polk's aggressive stance toward Mexico, writing to Richard T. Archer, "Your friends are trying hard to get us into a war, which I think will pretty well use up the South...I still hope there will be Sense and Virtue enough left in Congress to thwart their plans for President makeing by involving their Country in a nonsensical war." (The Mexican–American War began shortly thereafter.) Around the same time he started acquiring plantations across the Mississippi River in Louisiana, previously owned by Judge Barnabas G. Tenney of Vidalia, James Kempe, Archibald Williams, and Edward P. King.

In 1848 Elliot and fellow local businessman John T. McMurran were involved in creating the Raccourci cutoff as a short cut for steamboats. At the time of the 1851 Mississippi gubernatorial election, Elliot opposed John A. Quitman ("Unionists charged with considerable justification that the governor was plotting secretly with the South Carolinians to destroy the Union") and supported Henry S. Foote. In 1852 an editorial about the politics of Stephen A. Douglas mentioned the "largest slave-holders around Natchez" and then a few words later dropped the names Nathaniel Hoggatt, Stephen Duncan, Samuel Davis, H. Chotard, John Sanderson, Alexander Henderson, and Samuel Chamberlin. He was one of the "elite Natchez slaveholders" who used Charles P. Leverich and brothers of New York as commission merchant, business manager, and cotton factor; he ordered "three silver tea sets and a carriage" through Leverich in the early 1850s. Along with fellow Natchez planter-barons Stephen Duncan and Moses Liddell, Eliot frequently dealt with Rhode Island-born merchant R. G. Hazard, with whom he traded and from whom he ordered plantation supplies. During the same era, he commissioned the artist Louis Joseph Bahin to paint portraits of himself and his wife; they were hanging on the walls at D'Evereux as of 1997.

William St. John Elliot died in June 1855. He was at "the medicinal springs" near Florence, Alabama when he died; his remains were returned to Natchez. He was remembered in 1856 as one of five extremely wealthy planters of Concordia Parish, Louisiana who had died in quick succession, along with (in chronological order of death) Major James Surget, Captain Francis Surget Sr., Dr. Sanderson, and Peter Little, Esq. (For comparison, Francis Surget Sr., one of the largest slaveholders in the whole South, owned almost 1300 slaves in 1850.)

William St. John Elliot left money in his will for the establishment of Devereux Hall, an orphan asylum for boys in Natchez that was to be run by the Catholic Church. The orphanage was built on a pasture on the "northeast edge of town" and opened in 1860. Devereux Hall persisted until 1966 during which period the Brothers of the Sacred Heart had care of over 1,500 boys.

== Property and slaves ==
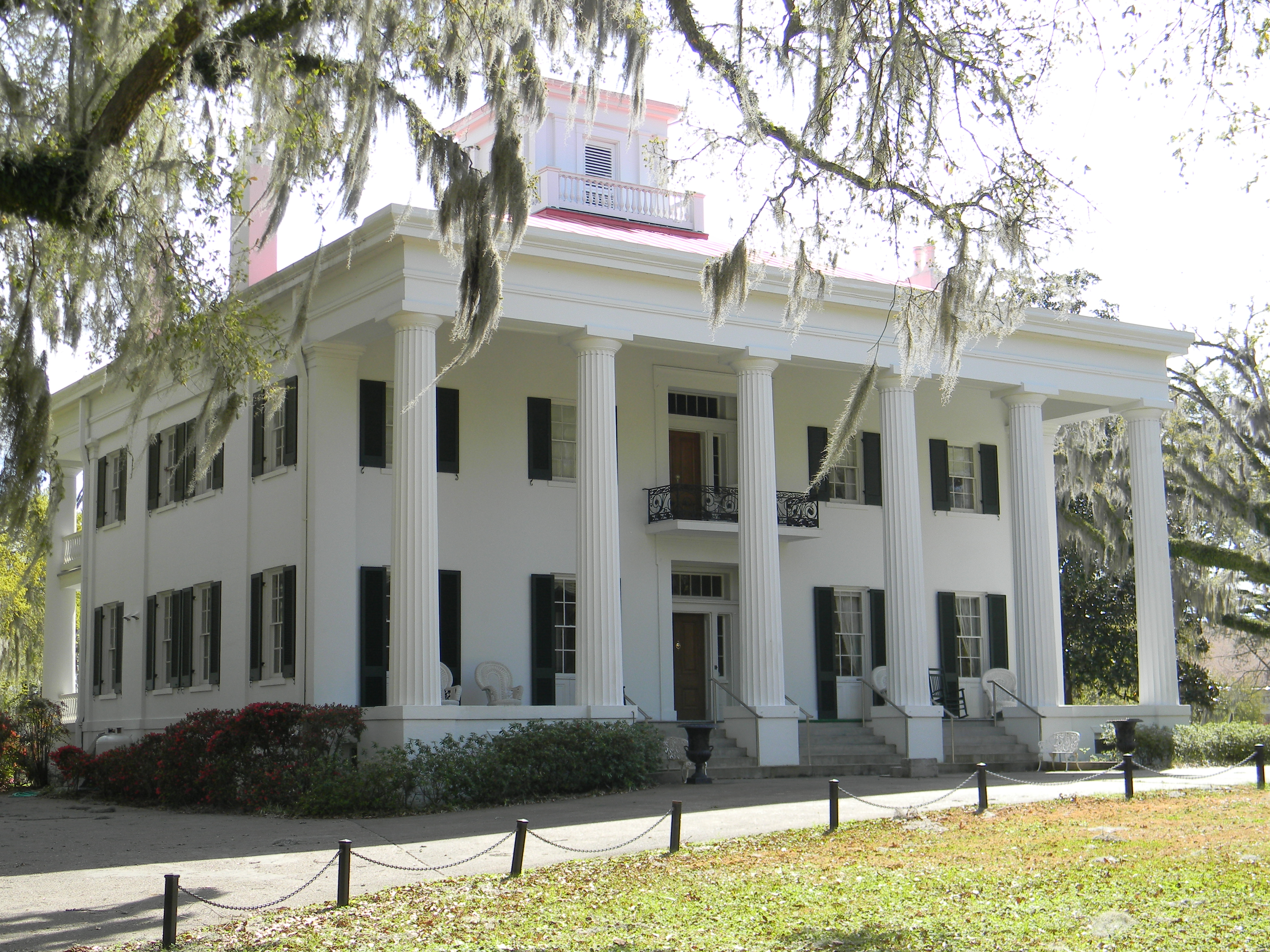
Construction on D'Evereux commenced around 1836

In 1836 he bought 80 acres from Henry Chotard and the heirs of James Moore, and he commissioned the construction of the Natchez suburban mansion D'Evereux. D'Evereux is considered "one of the purest Greek Revival" style houses in the region, but the design maintained the entranceway style, with the "elliptical fan transoms and sidelights," that was typically featured in pre-1830 homes. Construction was probably completed around 1840. Before the American Civil War, D'Evereux "could boast of the most impressive gardens in the vicinity. Twelve of the acres were landscaped, and at the back a series of thickly planted terraces descended to a lake complete with mill, boats, and swans."

As of 1840, he owned land in Adams County near the Woodville road and St. Catherine's Creek. Another description had it that his property was near the Washington and Liberty Road, not far from plantations owned by Robert Moore, James Moore, Seth Warren, Isaac Guion, Benajah Osmun, and a plantation called China Grove. In 1850 there were 130 people enslaved on a Wilkinson County plantation owned by William St. John Elliot. He owned a total of 293 people that year, including 19 resident in Adams County and another 143 just across the river in Concordia Parish. A "negro girl" he enslaved died of yellow fever on October 31, 1853 in Natchez. In 1854, Sam, Henry, and Buford, all about 20 years old, ran away from a plantation owned by St. John Elliott and were recaptured and jailed in Claiborne County, Mississippi.

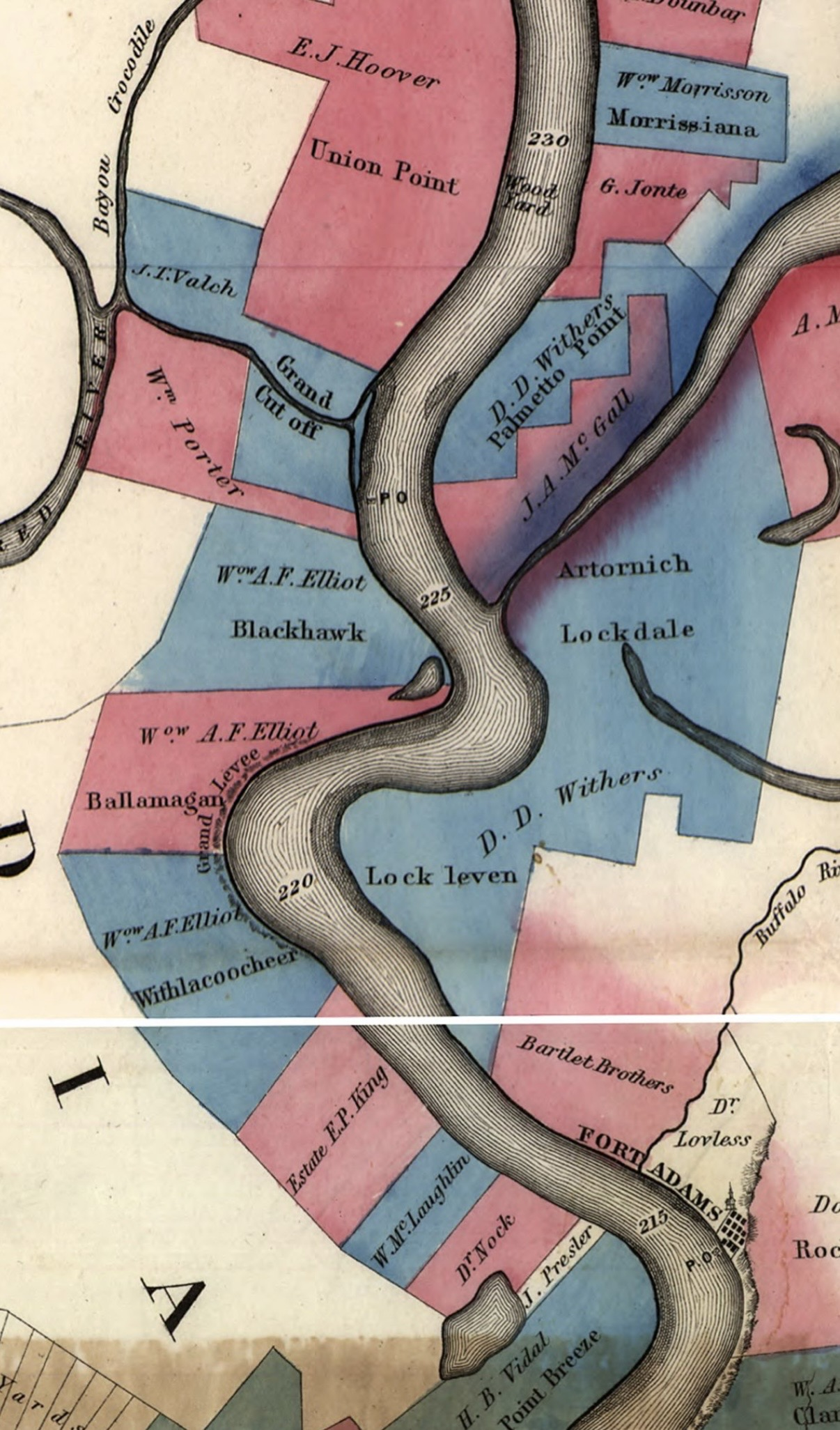
Detail of Norman's chart of the lower Mississippi River showing Widow A. F. Elliot's holdings in Concordia Parish

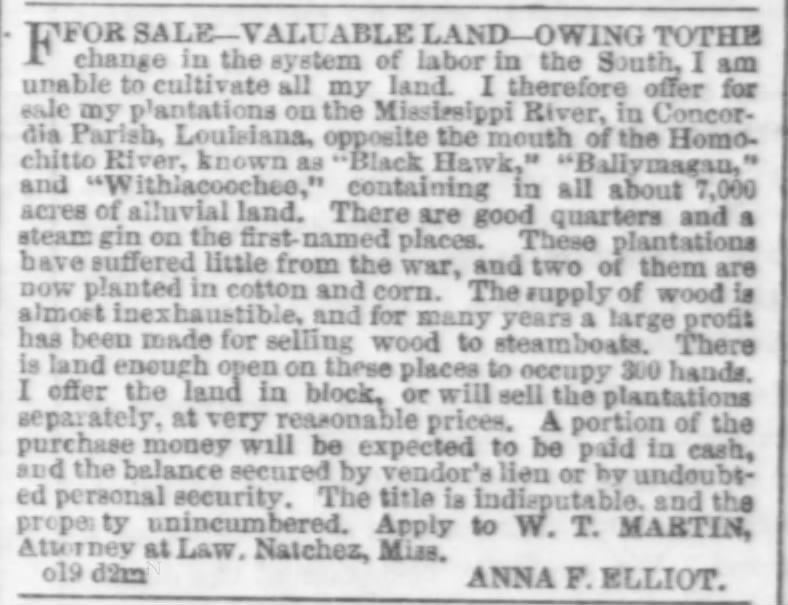
"For Sale–Valuable Land" Louisville Courier-Journal, December 16, 1865

The William St. John Elliot-owned plantation in Concordia Parish was called Black Hawk. His widow, Anna F. Elliot, ordered 400 blankets for slaves in 1855. She owned 449 people in 1860, 12 of whom lived in Adams County, while the remainder worked on cotton plantations across the Mississippi River in Concordia and Tensas Parishes, making her approximately the 19th-largest slaveholder resident in Mississippi. Her Tensas Parish plantation was called Balmoral and was located on the shore of Lake St. Joseph. According to a report prepared for the U.S. Army Corps of Engineers, her holdings in Concordia included somewhere between 5,000 and 7,500 acres, worked by at least 277 slaves. In November 1865, shortly after the end of the American Civil War, she sold all of the Concordia land to Lewis Trager.

In 1883 the Natchez Democrat published an obituary for a 70-year-old man named Willis Douglass who been enslaved by William St. John Elliot before the war. The same year, William T. Martin listed D'Evereux for rent at which time it was located on a 70-acre lot.

== Personal life ==
Elliot may have been the son of a "Madame Millikin" (or Milliken), whose brother was an Irish and/or South American revolutionary named John Devereaux. Elliot's sister, born Sarah Elliot, was married first to Isaac Ross Jr., son of Isaac Ross of Port Gibson, and after his death she became the second wife of plantation owner and banker Levin R. Marshall.

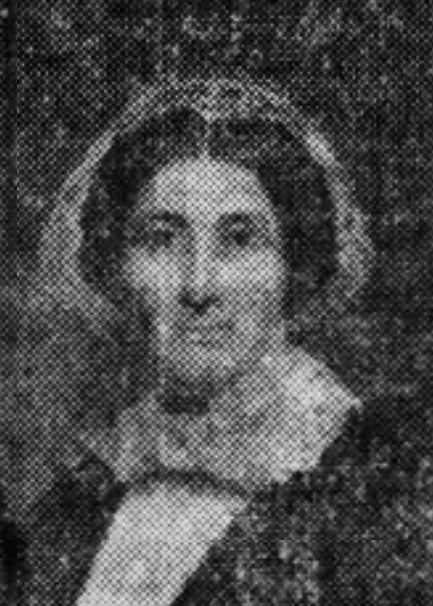
Anne F. Conner Elliot (1804–1876), painted 1840s by Louis Joseph Bahin

In 1828 Elliot was married to Anne Frances Conner "of Second Creek," a daughter of Mary Savage and William Conner of Berkeley Plantation, Adams County, Mississippi. He was her third husband, having earlier been twice a young widow, first by the death of a husband named Egbert H. Bell, and second by the death of Dr. William Hopper Ruffin, late of Wilkinson County. Her father William Conner had been an early settler of the Natchez District and served as speaker of the Mississippi Territory House of Representatives in 1803. The marriage to Anne F. Conner Bell Ruffin connected Elliot to the descendants of Tacitus Gaillard, as well as the Farars, the Chotards, the Turners, the McMurrans, the Ellises, the Butlers, and others.

The Elliots had no children. As told by 20th-century local historians, "As the years passed, the pain of having no sons to carry on and to rule over his holdings preyed upon Elliot's mind. He hatched a scheme: upon his death Elliot would will D'Evereux and his other holdings to his wife for the remainder of her life. Upon her death, his estate, including D'Evereux, would go to a nephew, provided the nephew legally changed his name to William St. John Elliot II, 'so as to represent me as my son,' Elliot wrote. If the boy refused to accept the condition of his bequest, according to one version of the story, D'Evereux would go to the Natchez Diocese for use as a Catholic home for orphaned boys. The parents of the nephew, who was a minor, declined the bequest on behalf of their son. After the boy's parents refused to accept the condition of Elliot's will, Anne Elliot provided an alternate nearby site for the orphanage". The writers of this retelling argue that Elliot may have inspired the William Faulkner character of Thomas Sutpen from Absalom, Absalom!, "a Southern planter with no legitimate male heir. In that convoluted story, Faulkner shows how possessing and compelling was the urge for continuity among Southern planters." When Anne Conner Elliot died in 1876, she left the residue of her estate to her grandniece Margaret Spencer Martin, a daughter of Confederate general William T. Martin and Anne's niece, Margaret Dunlop Conner. Margaret Spencer Martin became the wife of Bayard Fitzhugh Shields, a grandson of judge William Bayard Shields.

The Confederate general St. John Richardson Liddell, son of Wilkinson County planter Moses Liddell, was born John Richardson Liddell and may have started using the first name "St. John" because of Elliot.

== Sources ==
- Succession of William St. John Elliot (Ninth Judicial District Court, Concordia Parish, Louisiana July 1855) ("Inventories of Balmoral, Black Hawk, Ballymagan and Withlacoochee plantations").
- Ann Beha Associates (1997). Natchez National Historic Park (Natchez, Mississippi) Historical Resource Study (PDF) (Report). U.S. National Park Service.
- Hinks, Stephen; Heinrich, Paul V.; Smith, Susan B.; Athens, William P. (November 1993). Cultural Resources Survey of Palmetto and Coochie Revetments, Mississippi River M-326 to 315 (PDF) (Report). Cultural Resources Series. R. Christopher Goodwin & Associates, Inc. New Orleans, Louisiana: U.S. Army Corps of Engineers. Report No. COELMN/PD-94/03 – via Defense Technical Information Center.
- James, D. Clayton (1993) [1968]. Antebellum Natchez. Baton Rouge, Louisiana: Louisiana State University Press. ISBN 978-0-8071-1860-3. LCCN 68028496. OCLC 28281641.
- Moore, John Hebron (1958). Agriculture in Ante-Bellum Mississippi. Bookman Monograph Series. New York: Bookman Associates. LCCN 58031398. OCLC 2130869. OL 4957640W.
- Sansing, David G.; Callon, Sim C.; Smith, Carolyn Vance (1995) [1992]. "William St. John Elliot". Natchez: An Illustrated History (2nd ed.). Natchez, Miss.: Plantation Pub. Co. pp. 90–93. ISBN 978-0-9631823-1-9 – via Internet Archive.
- Scarborough, William Kauffman (2012). Masters of the Big House: Elite Slaveholders of the Mid-Nineteenth-Century South. Baton Rouge: Louisiana State University Press. ISBN 9780807156001. LCCN 2003007301. OCLC 846496079. Project MUSE book 23668.
- Wilson, Samuel Jr. (1989). "The Architecture of Natchez Before 1830". In Polk, Noel (ed.). Natchez Before 1830. The L. O. Crosby Jr. Memorial Lectures in Mississippi Culture. Jackson: University Press of Mississippi. pp. 136–153. ISBN 978-0-87805-380-3. LCCN 88028046. OCLC 18739746.
