= Natchez nabob =

Group of wealthy Americans in 19th-century Natchez

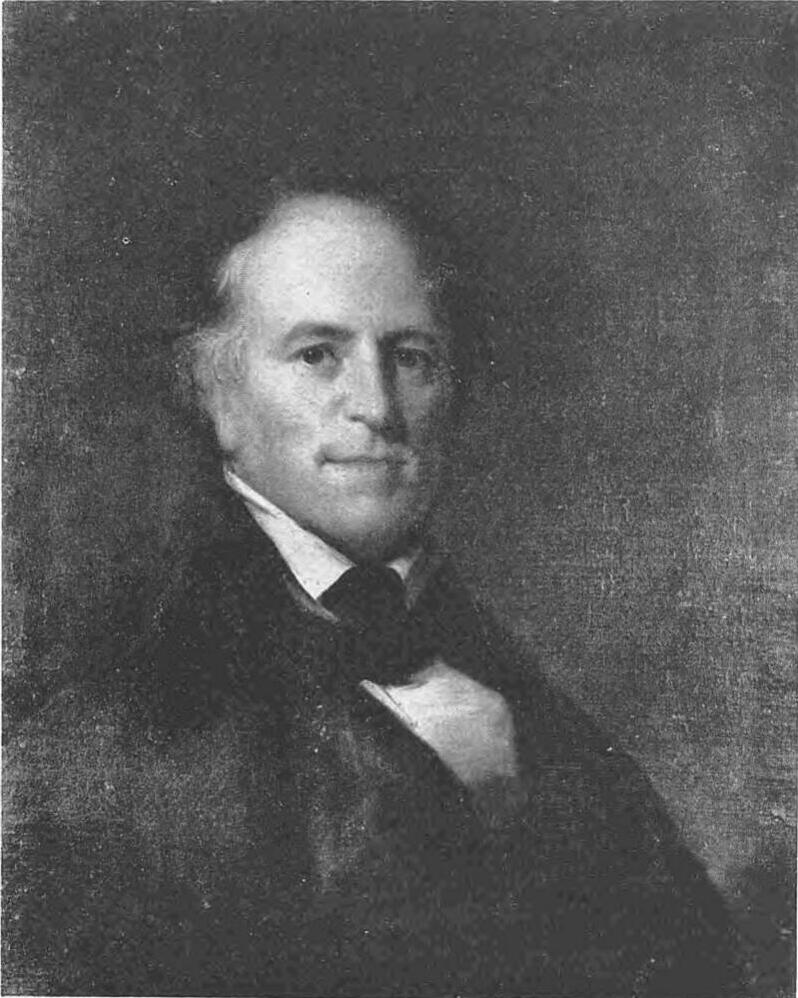
Stephen Duncan, one of the most prominent Natchez nabobs

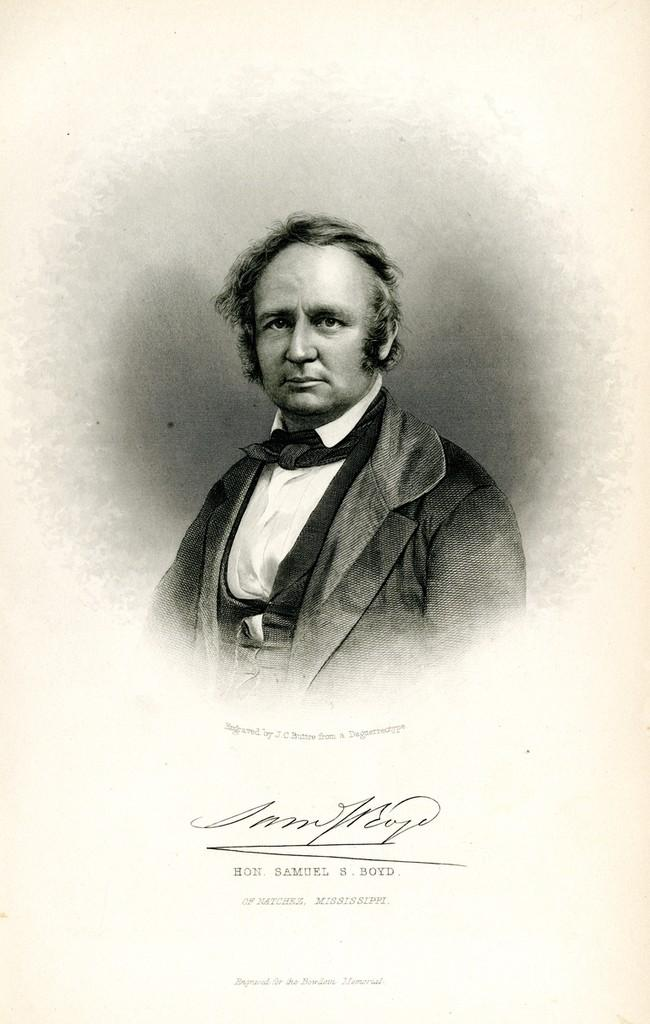
Samuel S. Boyd, another Natchez nabob

The Natchez nabobs were a group of wealthy American planters, lawyers, merchants, bankers, and politicians who lived in and around the Natchez District of the lower Mississippi River valley during the early- to mid-19th century. Their wealth came mainly from plantation agriculture, especially cotton and sugar, and depended on the labor of enslaved people. In addition to owning plantations, many nabobs were also involved in banking, commerce, landholding, transportation, and investment networks. Natchez was a barely upjumped frontier town, but while "The First Families of Virginia and the 'Rice Princes' of the South Carolina Lowcountry might look askance at Natchez, considering it a crude and uncultured town whose elite were nouveaux riches in comparison with those whose social, economic, and political ascendancy had begun in the 17th century, but to residents of the Lower Mississippi Valley it was the home of the state's most influential families and functioned as the region's social and cultural center as well as its 'principal emporium of commerce,' and eventually as one of the world's greatest cotton ports."

== Terminology ==
The term nabob was borrowed into English from the Hindustani term nawab, and was used for people who had acquired large fortunes and held elite social status. The term was already being used in the Mississippi Territory by 1803, when a document in the American Philosophical Society collection of Claiborne family papers was titled "A List of the Gentlemen Little Nabobs of the Mississippi Territory."

== History ==
The fertile land, location on the Mississippi River, and access to regional and national markets made the Natchez District well suited to plantation agriculture. During the early nineteenth century, the expansion of cotton cultivation increased the economic importance of the lower Mississippi Valley. In Natchez and the surrounding countryside, large plantations produced cotton and sugar for commercial markets, relying heavily on enslaved labor.

Although many of the founders of the nabob class had settled in the district in the late 18th century, the group became more clearly defined by the 1830s. In addition to agriculture, many of the nabobs were involved in banking, commerce, and finance, and invested in land, railroads, and stocks and bonds. Some wealthy merchants and lawyers also entered the planter elite by acquiring plantations through marriage or debt. By the 1830s, their wealth increasingly separated them from smaller planters and Natchez townspeople, and the nabobs began to form a more closed social group based on status, kinship, and property ties. As told by historian Ronald Davis, "Surrounding the town of Natchez was a plantation neighborhood so conspicuous as to have ranked with Charleston and New Orleans in the scale and opulence of its material culture. Students of Natchez history contend that district planters ranked among the richest slave masters in the South as well as among—in several cases—the nation's wealthiest citizens. Families like the Minors, Duncans, Metcalfs, Mercers, Bislands, Elliots, Surgets, McMurrans, Quitmans, the Davis brothers, Stantons, and Nutts, to name just a few, thought of Natchez as but an extension of their estate households. It was their practice and goal in life to amass substantial fortunes that could be displayed in lavish mansions and country residences wherein they could partake of all the amenities afforded the truly wealthy. Theirs was a lifestyle replete with horse racing, carriage rides, parties, elaborate marriage ceremonies, church goings, hunts, feasting, travels, gardening, and estate building." Historian David G. Sansing describes this as a shift from a more flexible first generation to a more rigid second and third generation of Natchez aristocrats. In this later period, family connections, bloodlines, and marriage within the same social rank became important ways for nabob families to keep wealth and status. Enslaved people worked in plantation fields, households, and other parts of the plantation economy, making their labor central to the wealth of the nabob class. As of 1830, the seven counties of the Natchez District (Adams County, Jefferson County, Claiborne County, Wilkinson County, Warren County, Amite County, Franklin County) "constituted only 34 percent" of Mississippi's White population but "possessed 65 percent of the slaves, paid 69 percent of the taxes, and owned 78 percent of the assessed property value of the state." One study of the most extensive American slaveholders in the 1850s found that "three-fourths (55 of 71) of Mississippi's largest slaveholders resided in Adams County and the three contiguous river counties of Claiborne, Jefferson, and Wilkinson."

After the Civil War began, some nabobs returned to their northern homes and supported the Union. In 1863, Stephen Duncan, one of the wealthiest Natchez nabobs, returned to New York. Before leaving the South, he presented the Confederate government with a bill for $185,000, claiming compensation for losses caused by secession.

== Notable figures ==
Stephen Duncan was one of the wealthiest members of the group. He owned at least 15 plantations, where he produced cotton and sugar with the labor of more than 250 enslaved people.

John A. Quitman was a planter, politician, military officer, and governor of Mississippi; some of the Natchez planter class were involved not only in agriculture and banking, but also in state politics. Other key nabobs included Francis Surget, Levin R. Marshall, and William J. Minor.

== William Johnson's 1837 list ==
William Johnson, "the free Negro barber" of Natchez, made a partial list of nabobs in his journal in 1837. These people had probably assembled for the races at Pharsalia Race Course. (Annotations by J. Clayton James, et al.)

- Gov. McNutt
- Gov. Reynolds [Runnels]
- W. B. Gov. Dr. Morgan
- Maj. A. Miller
- Mr. Ventress [James Alexander Ventress?]
- Col. Bingaman
- Capt. T. G. Ellis [Thomas G. P. Ellis, son of John Ellis?]
- Judge P. Ellis
- Mr. A. Cox
- Cap. Frank Surget
- Maj. Shotard
- Pres. E. B. Marshal [Marshall]
- Col. Harris
- Maj. Shields [Gabriel Benoist Shields, son of William Bayard Shields?]
- Dr. S. Duncan
- Maj. Jas. Surget
- Capt. J. B. Nevitt
- Mr. Saml. Davis
- Mr. J. F. Gelespie [John Field Gillespie]
- Judge Guion [John Isaac Guion or George S. Guion?]
- Mr. J. Turnbull
- Dr. Gwinn [Gwin]
- Brigadeer [sic] Gen. Quitman
- Capt. W. B. Minor [William J. Minor?]
- Maj. Young
- W. S. Elliott [William St. John Elliot?]
- Dr. S. Gustine [Samuel I. Gustine?]
- Mr. Reynolds of New Orleans
- Mr. L. Bingaman

== See also ==
- Natchez Trace
- History of Natchez, Mississippi
- Natchez, Mississippi slave market
- Mississippi Territory

== Sources ==
- Davis, Ronald L.F. (April 1993). The Black Experience in Natchez, 1720–1880. Special History Study, Natchez National Historical Park. U.S. National Park Service, Department of the Interior. LCCN 94139063. OCLC 817041561. List no. 93-0393-P – via HathiTrust.
- Tomich, Dale W.; Marquese, Rafael de Bivar; Funes Monzote, Reinaldo; Venegas Fornias, Carlos (2021). Reconstructing the landscapes of slavery: a visual history of the plantation in the nineteenth-century Atlantic world. Chapel Hill: The University of North Carolina Press. ISBN 978-1-4696-6311-1. LCCN 2020044270.
- Rothstein, Morton (1979). "The Changing Social Networks and Investment Behavior of a Slaveholding Elite in the Ante Bellum South: Some Natchez Nabobs, 1800–1860". In Greenfield, Sidney M.; Strickon, Arnold; Aubey, Robert T. (eds.). Entrepreneurs in Cultural Context. School of American Research, Advanced Seminar Series. Albuquerque: University of New Mexico Press. pp. 65–88. ISBN 978-0-8263-0504-6. LCCN 78021433. OCLC 4859059.
- Miles, Edwin Arthur (1970) [1960]. Jacksonian Democracy in Mississippi. The American Scene: Comments and Commentators. New York City: De Capo Press. LCCN 78107415. SBN 306-71884-7.
- Scarborough, William K. (December 2004). "Not Quite Southern: The Precarious Allegiance of the Natchez Nabobs in the Sectional Crisis". Prologue: Quarterly of the National Archives and Records Administration. University of Southern Mississippi. pp. 20–29 – via HathiTrust.
- Zacek, Natalie (2024). Thoroughbred Nation: Making America at the Racetrack, 1791–1900. Baton Rouge: Louisiana State University Press. ISBN 9780807183229. LCCN 2024010877. OCLC 1433150017. Project MUSE book 124505.
