= Louis Joseph =

Louis Joseph may refer to:

- Louis Joseph, Dauphin of France (1781–1789), son of Louis XVI of France
- Louis Joseph, Prince of Condé (1736–1818), member of the House of Bourbon
- Louis Joseph, Duke of Guise (1650–1671), Prince of Lorraine
- Louis Joseph, Duke of Vendôme (1654–1712), French general and Marshal of France
- Louis François Joseph, Prince of Conti (1734–1814)
- Louis Joseph Bahin (1813–1857), American painter in the Antebellum South
- Louis-Joseph de Montcalm (1712–1759), French military commander
- Louis-Joseph Papineau (1786–1871), Canadian politician
