= D'Evereux =

Historic house in Mississippi, United States

- D'Evereux Hall
- U.S. National Register of Historic Places
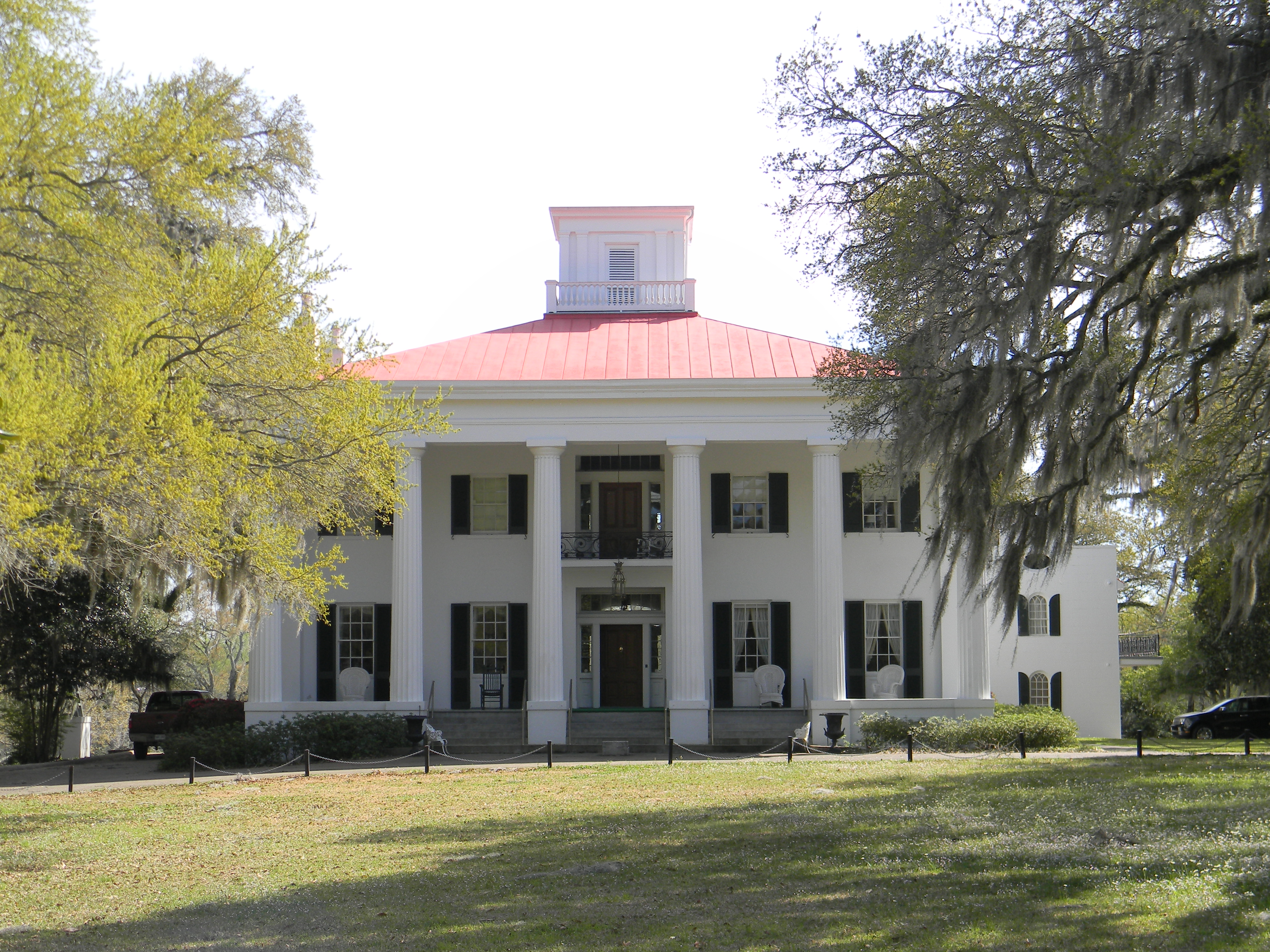
- D'Evereux in 2014

- Location within Mississippi Location within the United States
- Location: D'Evereaux Dr., Natchez, Mississippi
- Coordinates: 31°33′20″N 91°22′40″W
- Area: 7 acres (2.8 ha)
- Built: 1836
- Architectural style: Greek Revival
- NRHP reference No.: 72000683
- Added to NRHP: January 13, 1972

D'Evereux Hall is a mansion in Natchez, Mississippi, listed on the National Register of Historic Places.

D'Evereux was built for William St. John Elliot, a wealthy plantation owner, and his wife Anna Conner. The couple were social leaders in Natchez, and the home was named for Elliot's mother's family.

Completed in 1836, D'Evereux is one of the finest examples of Greek Revival architecture in the US. The builders and architects are not known, though in the home's attic are the signatures of William Ledbetter of Virginia, and P. H. Hardy of Ohio.

D'Evereux was one of the first residential structures in Natchez built with a full-length two-story portico. The six fluted Doric columns are spaced 12 ft (3.7 m) apart and are each 24 ft (7.3 m) in height. The home included the first cupola in a Natchez mansion.

According to the 1982 Mississippi Public Broadcasting documentary Natchez, by the 20th century, the neglected "D'Evereux was absolutely just in horrible condition. You can't imagine what it looked like."

D'Evereux is currently a private residence.

== Gallery ==
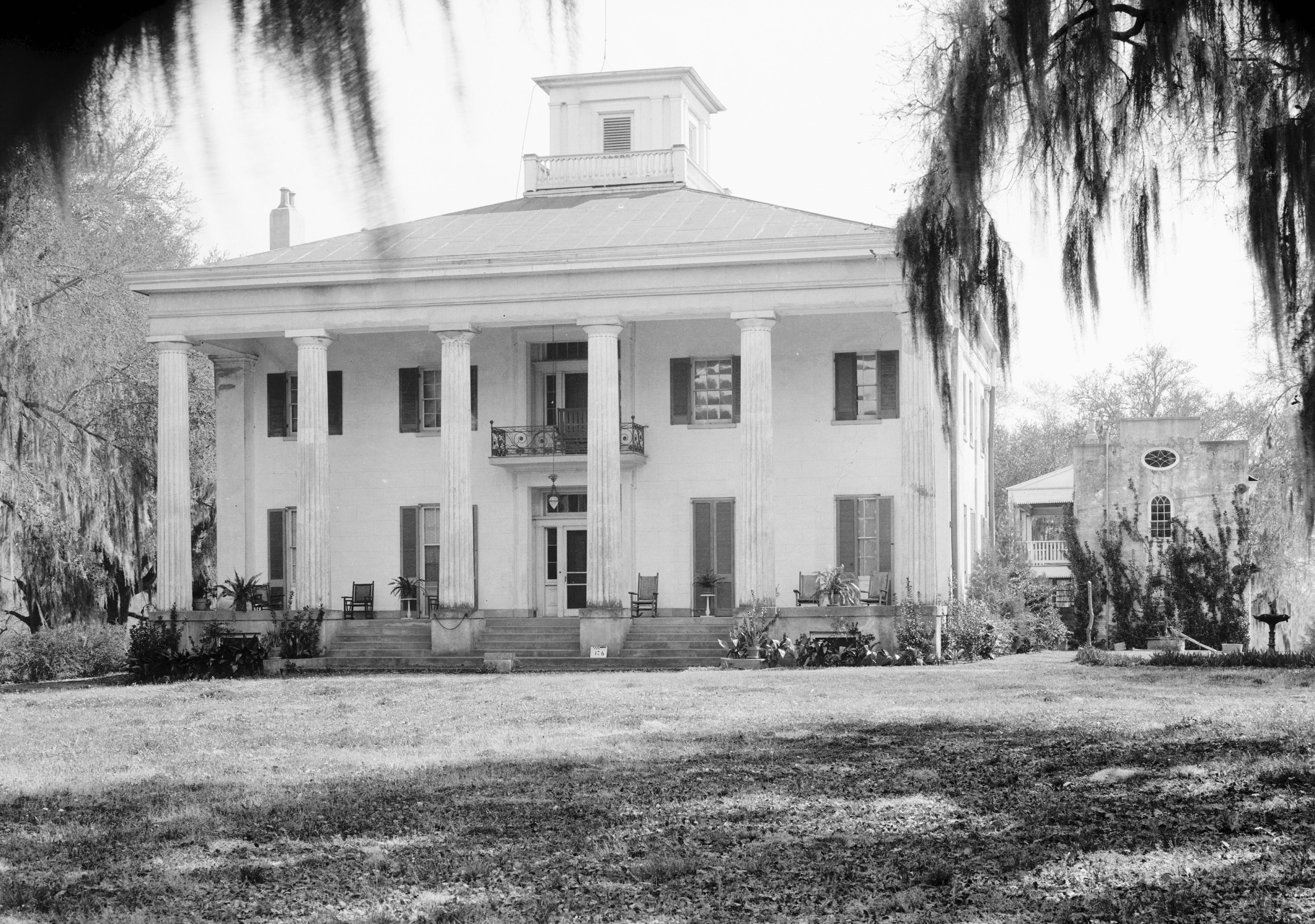
D'Evereux in 1934

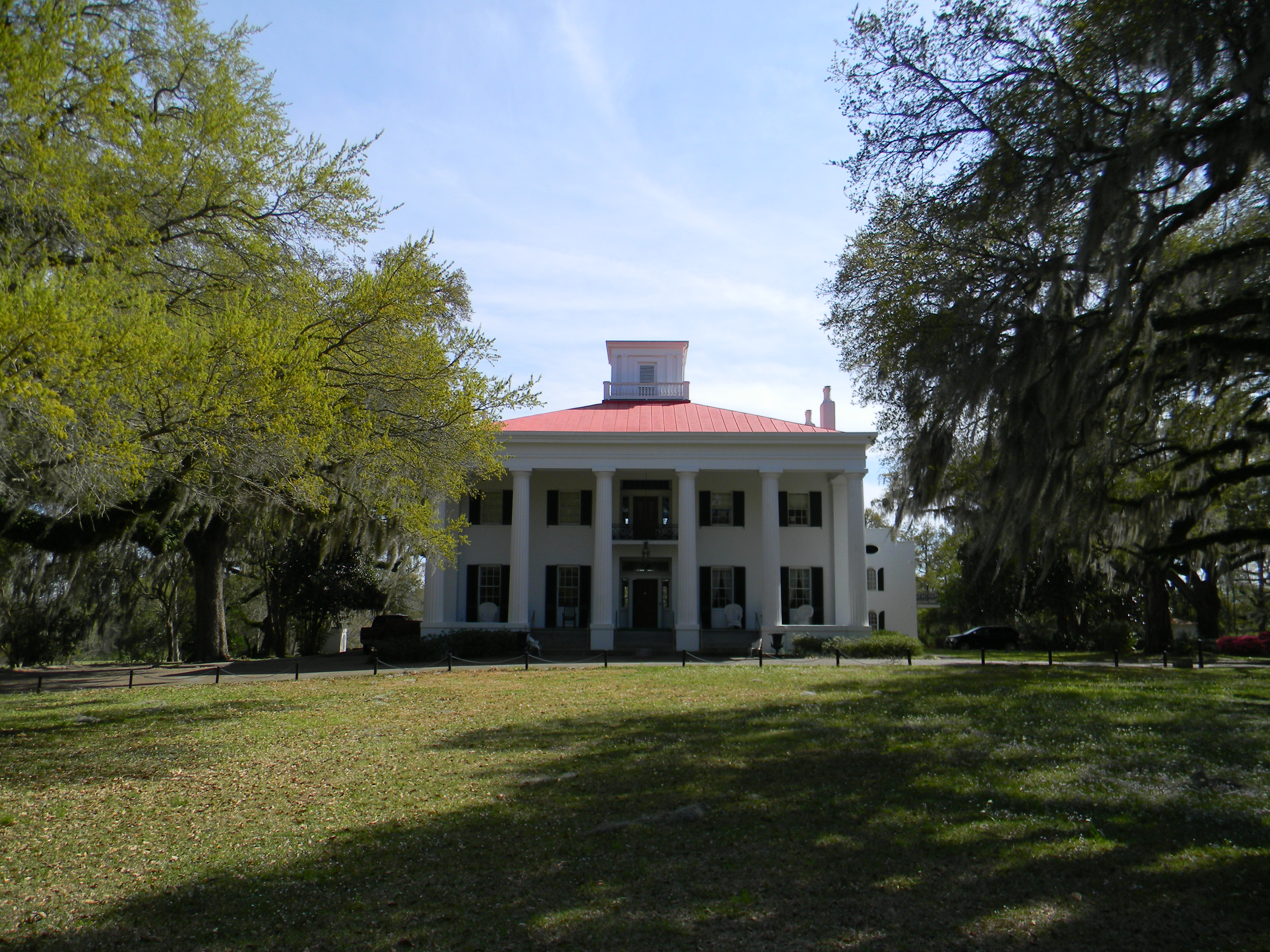
Front with grounds

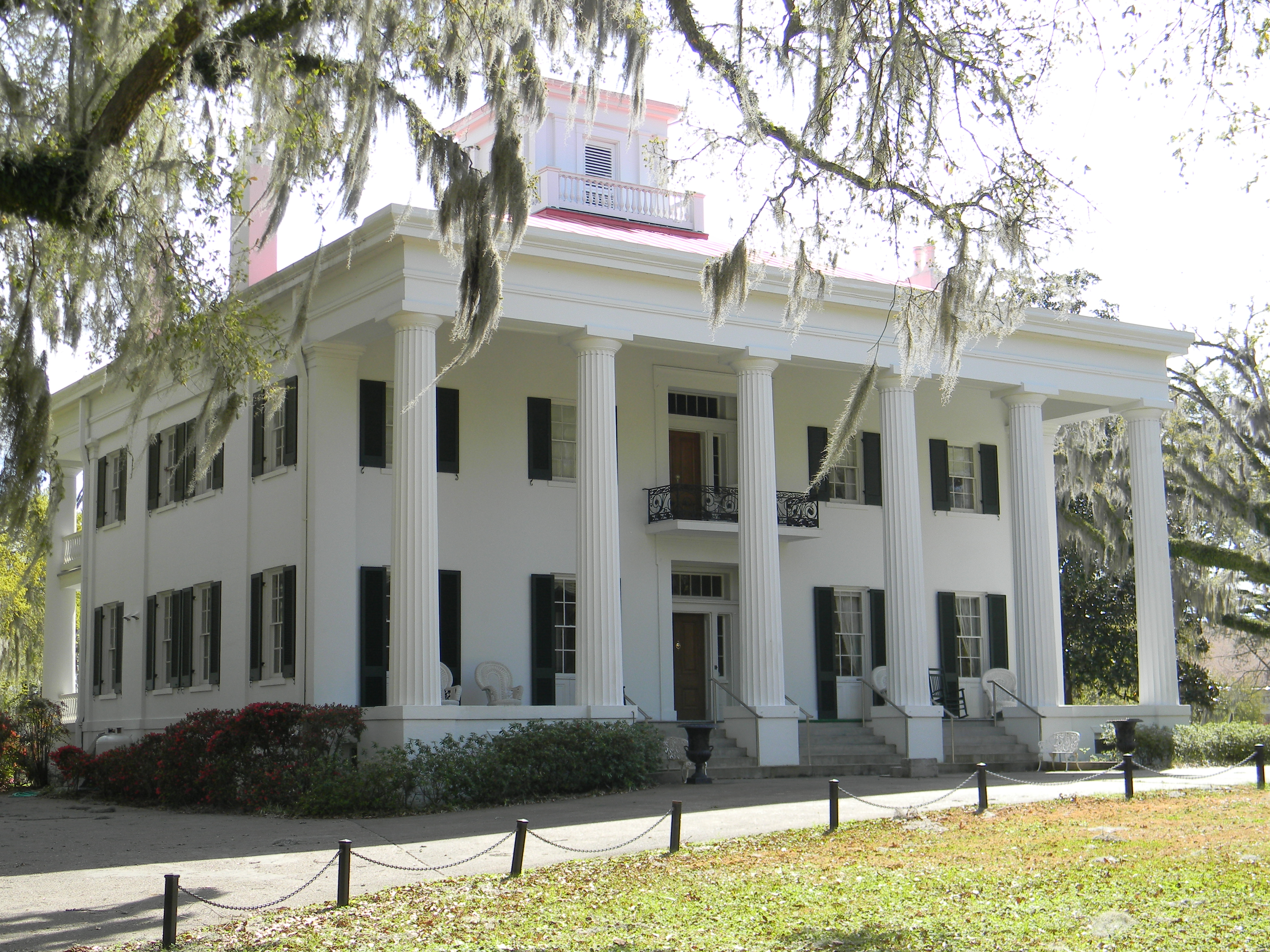
Front left

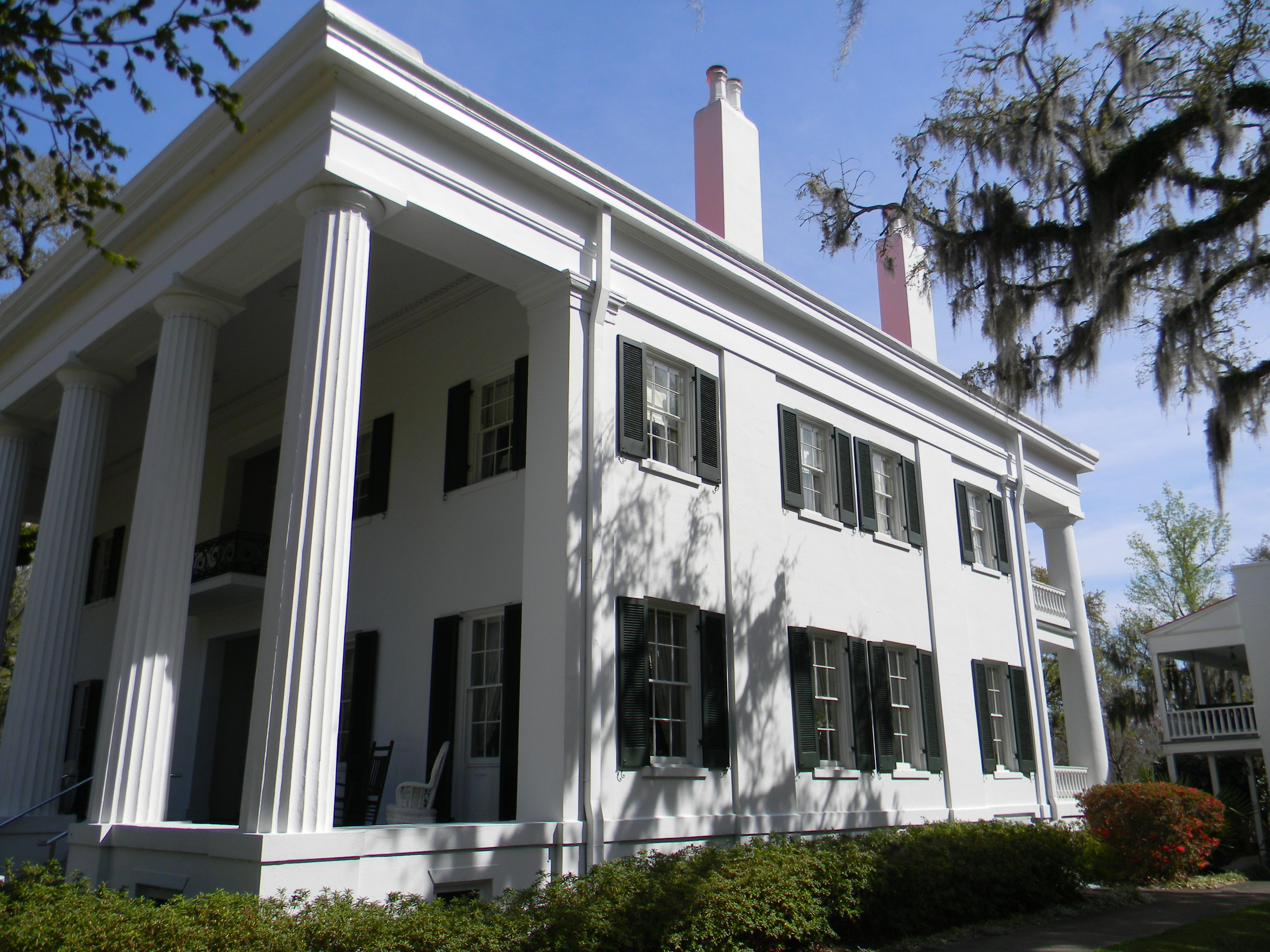
Front right
