= Samuel Davis (Louisiana planter) =

American capitalist (1780s–1853)

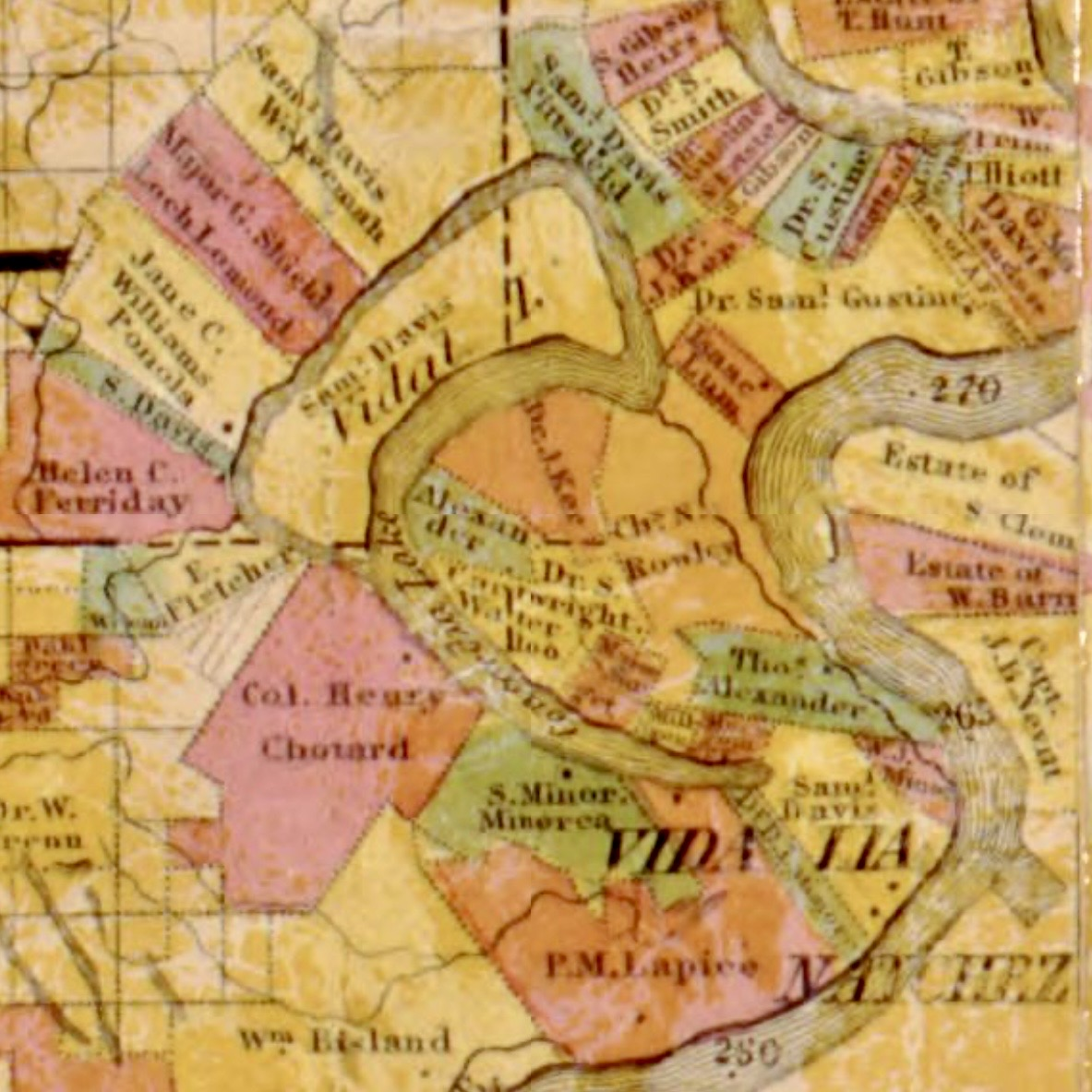
Samuel Davis, Henry Chotard, and P. M. Lapice plantations in vicinity of Vidalia, Louisiana in 1853

Samuel Davis (c. 1788–September 14, 1853) was a major plantation and slave owner of the antebellum U.S. South who also speculated in farmland, invested in banks and railroads, maintained a ferry monopoly at a key crossing the Mississippi River, and was remembered as an enterprising risk-taker for having used a steamboat to transport cotton from Natchez to New Orleans in 1811. Most of Davis' plantations were in Concordia Parish, Louisiana, on land inherited through his wife from José Vidal, a Spanish colonial administrator who had been awarded large land grants on the Louisiana side of the river immediately opposite the commercially significant settlement of Natchez.

Cotton was the primary product grown by the people enslaved on Davis' multiple plantations. Davis plantation cotton was considered to be of high quality. He operated on "scientific principles," using what new mechanisms were available and advising other planters to provide cistern water for slaves to prevent the spread of cholera. When cotton stored in a gin house owned by Davis burned in 1850 the estimated loss was US$20,000 (equivalent to $774,000 in 2025). His plantations produced 3,000 to 5,000 bales of cotton annually.

Considered one of the Natchez nabob elite in 1837, Davis and his wife had settled into an elegant house in Philadelphia by 1850, which they shared with a child and six servants. Husband and wife died four days apart in September 1853. Their estate was largely inherited by their children, most notably sons Alfred V. Davis and Samuel M. Davis, who had been educated at the University of Pennsylvania but returned to the lower Mississippi River valley to carry on their cotton-planting businesses. One married a daughter of planter baron Stephen Duncan, and the other married a daughter of planter baron Francis Surget, and they each were the legal owners of hundreds of people in 1860, immediately prior to the outbreak of the American Civil War. S. M. Davis was said to have been an avid secessionist. A. V. Davis served as an officer in the Confederate Army for four months.

S. M. Davis died in Virginia in 1878. A. V. Davis moved to Pass Christian, Mississippi, where he died in 1899, at which time he was memorialized as having been one of the "planter princes" of the antebellum South.

== Biography ==
Samuel Davis
- Born: c. 1788; Possibly New Bedford, Massachusetts
- Died: September 14, 1853; Philadelphia, Pennsylvania

Samuel Davis was born in Massachusetts in the 1780s. He arrived in Natchez by 1811. Some sources say he came from Philadelphia. He married Maria Clarissa Vidal, a daughter of the namesake of Vidalia, Louisiana, Don Jose Vidal. Maria Clarissa Vidal was born about 1797 in Louisiana. Vidal was said to "have laid the foundation of the immense estate of the late Samuel Davis Esq." Originally a lawyer, after his marriage Davis "directed his attention to proper management of his immense estates."

=== Early career ===
When the steamboat New Orleans arrived in Natchez in 1811, per J. F. H. Claiborne, "Davis was the only man in the crowd that had the nerve to ship cotton on the first trip of the boat. The first cotton ever shipped by steamer from Natchez was shipped by him, and he was thought to be taking a very great risk." Davis is elsewhere credited with being, in the late 1810s, a pioneer of the use of steam power to ship cotton from Natchez to New Orleans: "With the replacing of the New Orleans by the old Vesuvius, steamboat commerce between the two big Southwestern cities was begun on a large scale." In 1827 he and John Ker published a statement supporting John Quincy Adams for reelection as president. At some point he hosted a grand dinner in honor of Massachusetts politician Edward Everett, at which Adam L. Bingaman made a toast in Choctaw (Chahta), and "No one present understood it except Mr. Davis and Colonel Claiborne." In 1829 Davis bought 12 people from "Alfred Bowran, of Clarke County, Kentucky."

=== Land speculation ===
1841 map of Concordia Parish with listing of original Spanish land grants

According to Mississippi historian Claiborne, "Mr. Wm. M. Gwin, after the death of his brother, became a large operator in lands, in conjunction with the late H. R. W. Hill, of New Orleans; subsequently with Dennistoun & Co., of New Orleans and Liverpool, and Samuel Davis, of Natchez. In the summer of 1836, he entered for this company over 100,000 acres, chiefly in Arkansas, and was offered by a New York firm a profit of $100,000 for the investment, which he vainly urged his friends to accept. The great financial revulsion of 1837 proved the wisdom of his advice." In the telling of 20th-century historian Clayton James, Gwin headed a "Democratic clique" out of Vicksburg known as the Mississippi Regency, with an "emphasis on...party rather than sectional domination of Mississippi politics." The Regency both promoted politicians with Robert J. Walker and Alexander J. McNutt, and ran a land-speculation concern with James C. Wilkins, Levin R. Marshall, and Davis, "which manipulated lucrative schemes in Arkansas, Texas, and Mississippi."

By 1837 he owned two plantations 11 mi (18 km) from Vidalia at Lake Concordia. The same year, William Johnson, a free man of color who lived and worked in Natchez, included "Mr. Saml. Davis" on a list he made in his journal of Natchez nabobery in town for the races at Pharsalia. "A valuable servant of Samuel Davis" died in a fall from the second story of a building under construction in 1842. In 1846 he paid to have his father-in-law's body moved from New Orleans and reinterred under a monument in Natchez City Cemetery. In 1848 he had listed for sale thousands of acres of cotton land in "Union and adjoining counties," Arkansas, accessible from the "Washita River".

=== Plantations and slaves ===
In July 1849 he wrote a public letter advising other planters on cholera protections for their enslaved labor forces that "it is very certain that Cistern is much healthier than river water in summer, drank as it usually is by slaves." A British geologist named Charles Lyell wrote about meeting Davis, who "impressed him the most" of the slave owners he encountered, "because of his humanitarian concern for his Negroes." Lyell felt that Davis-owned slave quarters were "neatly built and well whitewashed." James, writing in 1968, commented, "Davis' interest in his slaves as persons, however, was probably exceptional among the Natchez nabobs, who generally were concerned with their colored people mainly as chattel investments."

A fire broke out in the cotton gin at his Island plantation at Lake Concordia at 3 a.m. on October 31, 1849, destroying the gin house and 125 bales of cotton. On a Sunday night at the beginning of December 1850, "the gin house on the plantation of Samuel Davis, in the rear of this town [Vidalia], was discovered to be on fire; the large quantity of cotton in the house was in a few moments in a blaze, the country for miles around was lighted up by the flame. The loss cannot be less than 15 or 20 thousand dollars," which is roughly $500,000 to $750,000 in 2025 dollars. In December 1852, there was another fire at a Davis plantation, this time destroying "a negro house and the kitchen of the quarters."

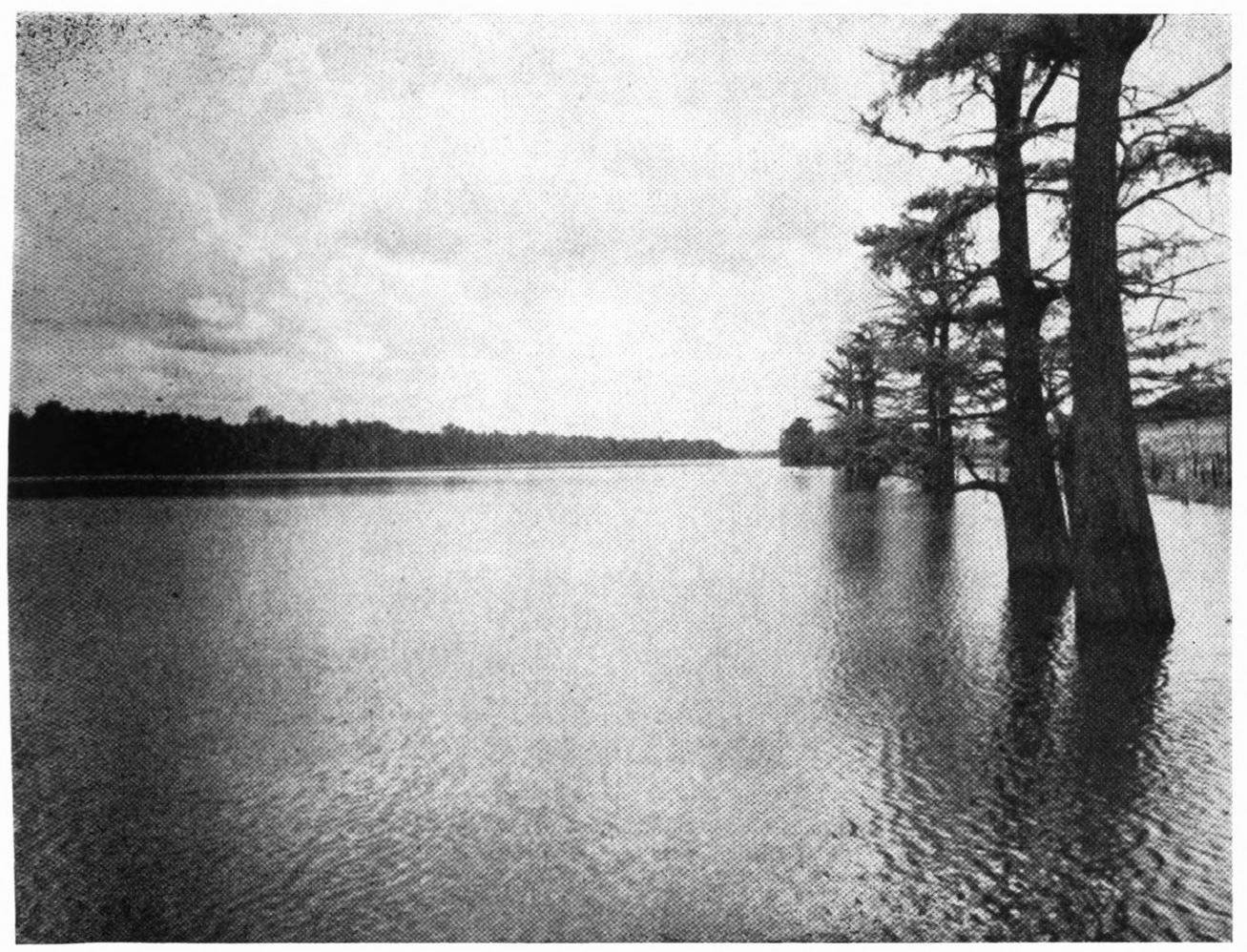
Lake Concordia c. 1949

Davis was enumerated as an owner of two plantations on slave schedules of the 1850 federal census of Concordia Parish, along with plantations owned by P. M. Lapice located on both sides. Davis owned 485 slaves attached to one plantation, and 79 attached to another. In addition to the Lake Concordia plantations near Lapice, he owned "Pittsfield, Weecama, and all the Island" plantations. The same year the Concordia Intelligencer reported, "The two best cotton crops we saw in our tour was on the Wickemore plantation on Lake Concordia belonging to Samuel Davis. Esq., and on Mrs. Hoover's plantation on the Tensas river. The owners of these places may reasonably expect to make a bale to the acre of the best quality of cotton." Davis himself was a resident of Philadelphia in 1850, living with his wife Maria (born in Louisiana around 1795), a 10-year-old named Pauline Davis (born in Philadelphia), and six servants (all natives of Ireland). Davis listed his occupation as planter. The court case Police Jury of Concordia v Samuel Davis made the New Orleans papers in 1850. In 1851 Davis was said to own "the town of Vidalia and also very extensive and valuable plantations adjacent hitherto." In 1853, a mechanical cotton stalk harvester was in use on one or more of his plantations. In July 1853, Davis sued "Philander Wood for his refusal to deliver up a certain slave named Charles Clark" (who had died of yellow fever while hired out to Wood), seeking $2,000 in damages but the jury found for Clark.

=== Business papers ===
Louisiana State University at Baton Rouge holds a collection of Jose Vidal and Samuel Davis documents. As summarized by the WPA's Historical Records Survey and published in 1940, the collection includes:

Business and legal papers of Joseph (Jose) Vidal, secretary to Manuel Gayoso de Lemos, Governor of the District of Natchez, 1787–1797, and later Commandant of the Post of Concordia, Louisiana, and also those of Vidal's son-in-law, Samuel Davis. The early part of the collection embodies a number of documents (in Spanish) concerning land grants, transfers, and surveys issued by the Spanish during the last years of the 18th century. A series of conveyances, 1805–1863, deals with lands in Natchez, Mississippi, and Concordia, Louisiana. Land speculation in Mississippi, Louisiana, and Arkansas is the subject of a large number of documents, 1834–1866, in which is included an agreement among Samuel Davis, John Boll, Robert Gordon, Peter M. Lapice, and others to purchase the Chickasaw Reservation of lands, 1834. Miscellaneous petitions, conveyances, and items regarding banking enterprises in Mississippi are scattered chronologically throughout the collection. Varied items include: a petition of Vidal to the Mississippi territorial legislature for exclusive right to operate a ferry between Natchez, Mississippi, and Vidalia, Louisiana, 1812; a conveyance by Barnabas Langdon, Troy, New York, to Samuel Davis of a patent on a horse-boat, and the right to operate tho boat 50 miles above and below New Orleans, 1823; sale of a pew in Trinity Church, Natchez, Mississippi, to James Moore, 1829; and currency issued by the Mississippi and Alabama Railroad Company, 1837–1838; a statement shows the condition of the Bank of the State of Mississippi, 1831; similar items dating from 1829 to 1840 include certificates of bank stock, and a resolution designating Samuel Davis as special agent of the Planters Bank of Natchez, to transact business with New York and Philadelphia banking houses.

=== Death and legacy ===
Samuel Davis died in Philadelphia in September 1853 of pulmonary apoplexy. Maria Clarissa Vidal Davis had died four days prior, at her home at the corner of Broad Street and Poplar Street, of congestion of the lungs. Coincidentally, there was an unusual yellow fever outbreak in Philadelphia in September 1853. The Davises were buried beside each other at Laurel Hill Cemetery. Their Philadelphia house, known as the Benjamin Stiles house (for the original owner), was sold in December 1853 for US$50,000 (equivalent to $1,935,000 in 2025) to a principal of the Anspach, Brother & Co. anthracite coal company. The Samuel Davis art collection, advertised to be "old masters, a portion in richly carved Italian frames," was listed for sale at the same time. Davis kept a record of the rise and fall of the Mississippi River for 23 years, from 1817 to 1840. As reported in De Bow's Review, the "great estate" of Samuel Davis "always produced" 3,000 to 5,000 bales annually until his death and the subdivision of his lands and slaves by inheritance.

== Davis v. Police Jury of Concordia (1839–1850) ==
Per a 1932 history of Concordia Parish, "In 1801, the Spanish Government, through the Marquis of Casa Calvo, granted to Thomas Thompson, (brother-in-law of Vidal), In 1803, Thompson conveyed his franchise to José Vidal, who continued to operate the ferry, through his lessees, until 1817, when he sold it to Samuel Davis, (his son-in-law), 'who has ever since kept up a ferry,' says the Court. In 1839, the Police Jury passed an ordinance for the letting of a ferry privilege from Vidalia to Natchez to the highest bidder. Davis enjoined their action, setting up a perpetual and exclusive franchise from the Spanish Government to his author in title, Thompson; his continuous operation of the ferry and the acquiescence of the Police Jury by the collection of a yearly license fee of $10; that the Police Jury had no power to set the grant aside, or to operate a ferry within three miles, etc." The state court dissolved Davis' injunction and the U.S. Supreme Court affirmed the state court's decision. The decision in Davis v. Police Jury of Concordia (50 U.S. 9 How. 280 1850) was rendered by the Taney court in 1850.

== Heirs ==
Davis' sons, Samuel M. Davis, George Davis, Alfred V. Davis, and Dr. Frederick Davis inherited a "sizable agricultural domain" from their parents, encompassing at least 14,649 acres, and at least 843 slaves, who collectively produced at least 6,639 bales of cotton annually. Samuel Manuel Davis (November 15, 1819–September 14, 1878) and Alfred Vidal Davis (September 7, 1826–May 13, 1899) were two of the largest slave owners in the lower Mississippi River valley in 1860 on the eve of the American Civil War. The brothers, like their father before them, were squarely within the Natchez nabob class that consolidated itself (by marriage and increasingly restrained social norms) during the 1830s into a group whose "practice and goal in life [was] to amass substantial fortunes that could be displayed in lavish mansions and country residences wherein they could partake of all the amenities afforded the truly wealthy. Theirs was a lifestyle replete with horse racing, carriage rides, parties, elaborate marriage ceremonies, church goings, hunts, feasting, travels, gardening, and estate building."

American Civil War-era papers in the Vidal Davis special collection at LSU include "a list of property taken from Pittsfield Plantation" in 1863, and the statement of a provost marshal that "an agent of Samuel Davis had burned 590 bales of cotton on Holly Ridge Plantation in accordance with orders of Gen. P. G. T. Beauregard."

=== Samuel Manuel Davis ===
Samuel Manuel Davis
- Born: November 5, 1819; Vidalia, Louisiana
- Died: September 14, 1878 (aged 58); Winchester, Virginia

Samuel Manuel Davis entered the University of Pennsylvania "Soph. Class 1836." Samuel M. Davis was married to Charlotte Duncan, a daughter of nabob Stephen Duncan, in 1846.

Samuel M. Davis bought Sunnyside, adjacent to Auburn, from his father-in-law Stephen Duncan for $17,000 in the 1850s. Duncan gave Holly Ridge plantation and 105 slaves to his daughter Charlotte. Planter Henry B. Vidal, presumably an uncle, cousin, or in-law of some flavor, died May 22, 1858. Samuel M. Davis administered the estate of Henry B. Vidal.

As of 1860, Samuel Manuel Davis owned 560 people enslaved variously in Natchez, Issaquena County, Mississippi, and Concordia Parish. Politician Walter Q. Gresham mentioned the brothers in his memoir: "Another accomplished family was that of Mr. Samuel Davis. He lived just at the edge of town in Sunnyside, his brother Alfred Vidal Davis near by in Dunleith. As I remember it Samuel Davis's family consisted of himself, Mrs. Davis, and a daughter. He was frank in his secessionist views. He was wealthy and his wine cellar was still well stocked with wine that had been imported before the war. He gave most elegant and sumptuous dinners."

Sunnyside was listed for sale in 1872, at which time it was described as "containing thirteen rooms, with gas and chandeliers in all the rooms. There are two buildings adjoining the main house, two stories high, with nine rooms for servants rooms, dairy and kitchen; two fine cellars; three large cisterns; a gas house; billiard, conservatory and green houses; fine stable and carriage house; five quarters for laborers; good pond of water and forty acres of fine, level land—all timber. A beautiful avenue leads to the house. The above property was the former residence of Mr. Samuel M. Davis. It is one hundred yards outside of the present city limits." The house burned sometime after 1888, and was part of the property, along with Auburn house and grounds, that was donated to Natchez by the heirs of Stephen Duncan for a park. In 1912 it was said that "its ruins—standing walls, overgrown with ivy, are very interesting."

Samuel Manuel Davis died in 1878 in Winchester, Virginia.

=== Alfred Vidal Davis ===
Alfred Vidal Davis
- Born: September 7, 1826; Vidalia, Louisiana
- Died: May 13, 1899 (aged 72); Pass Christian, Mississippi

Albert Vidal Davis graduated from the University of Pennsylvania in 1845, and Harvard Law School in 1847. Alfred V. Davis described himself as a "planter of Louisiana" when applying for a U.S. passport in 1853. In 1855, Alfred Davis was married to Sarah Surget, a daughter of wealthy Natchez planter Francis Surget. Sarah Surget Davis "had inherited Duck Pond Plantation (Adams County) from her father, and her husband purchased Sycamore Plantation (Concordia Parish) from the Francis Surget Sr. estate." The family of politician, businessman, and Black American John Roy Lynch had been legally owned by A. V. Davis. Lynch worked in the house for Davis personally as a child, and picked cotton in the fields as a teenager.

As of 1859, A. V. Davis was recognized as part of an elite group of planters whose slaves produced 3,000 bales of cotton annually. The Davises bought the Natchez mansion Routhlands from the Dahlgrens in 1859, and changed the name to Dunleith. The Davises are credited with installing the iron gate and fence in front of the house. As of 1860, A. V. Davis had 14 people enslaved at their town house near Natchez in Adams County, Mississippi, and another 637 people enslaved on cotton plantations in Concordia Parish, Louisiana, immediately across the river. As of 1861, Davis had two plantations on the shore of Lake Concordia, called Sahara and Potowomut. He was a captain of Company E of the 4th Louisiana Infantry Battalion from August to November 1861.

Sarah Surget Davis died in 1865. Davis remarried, to Mary Dunbar, a granddaughter of Sir William Dunbar of Forest Plantation, in 1869. The family moved at that time to Pass Christian, Mississippi on the Gulf Coast.

A. V. Davis was on the police jury of Concordia Parish in 1870 along with "Louis Trager, Winston Briggs (Negro), Noah Graham (Negro), Isaac Evans (Negro), William Shorter (Negro), George Downs (Negro), D. L. Rivers, and Wilson Robertson."

As of 1887, the A. V. Davis residence at Pass Christian was described as an "elegant residence" surrounded by vineyards. At his death in 1899, A. V. Davis was described as having been one of the "planter princes" of the antebellum south.

== Sources ==
- Biographical and Historical Memoirs of Mississippi: Embracing an Authentic and Comprehensive Account of the Chief Events In the History of the State and a Record of the Lives of Many of the Most Worthy and Illustrious Families and Individuals. Chicago: The Goodspeed Publishing Co. 1891 – via HathiTrust.
- Biographical catalogue of the matriculates of the college together with lists of the members of the college faculty and the trustees, officers and recipients of honorary degrees, 1749–1893. Philadelphia: University of Pennsylvania. 1894.
- Brazy, Martha Jane (2006). An American Planter: Stephen Duncan of Antebellum Natchez and New York. Southern biography series. Baton Rouge: Louisiana State University Press. ISBN 978-0-8071-3141-1. LCCN 2006004936. OCLC 781615086. Project MUSE book 16565.
- Calhoun, Robert Dabney (January 1932). "A History of Concordia Parish, Louisiana". The Louisiana Historical Quarterly. 15 (1). Baton Rouge: Louisiana Historical Society: 44–67. ISSN 0095-5949. OCLC 1782268 – via Internet Archive.
- Claiborne, J. F. H. (1880). Mississippi, as a Province, Territory, and State: with Biographical Notices of Eminent Citizens. Jackson, Miss.: Power & Barksdale. LCCN 00002482. OCLC 2108221. OL 24156390M.
- Concordia (1949). Concordia Parish resources and facilities. Baton Rouge: Concordia Parish Development Board.
- Davis, Ronald L.F. (April 1993). The Black Experience in Natchez, 1720–1880. Special History Study, Natchez National Historical Park. U.S. National Park Service, Department of the Interior. LCCN 94139063. OCLC 817041561. List no. 93-0393-P – via HathiTrust.
- Eidt, Mary; Terry, Don (April 19, 1979). "Tacony Plantation House, Vidalia – NHRP Nomination Form". National Register of Historic Places Inventory. U.S. Department of the Interior – National Park Service.
- Gresham, Matilda McGrain (1919). Life of Walter Quintin Gresham, 1832–1895. Chicago: Rand, McNally & Co. hdl:2027/loc.ark:/13960/t6445tb87. LCCN 20003856. OCLC 1513395.
- Gross, Ariela J. (2001). Double Character: Slavery and Mastery in the Antebellum Southern Courtroom. Princeton University Press. doi:10.1515/9781400823840. ISBN 978-1-4008-2384-0. Project MUSE book 84568.
- James, D. Clayton (1993) [1968]. Antebellum Natchez. Baton Rouge: Louisiana State University Press. ISBN 978-0-8071-1860-3. LCCN 68028496. OCLC 28281641.
- Jones, William D. (Fall 2021). "Beyond New Orleans: Forced Migrations To, From, and In Louisiana, 1820–1860". Louisiana History: The Journal of the Louisiana Historical Association. 62 (4): 429–468. ISSN 0024-6816. JSTOR 27095320.
- Louisiana Historical Records Survey (1940). Hogan, William Ransom (ed.). Guide to the manuscript collections in Louisiana, the Department of archives, Louisiana state university. Baton Rouge: Louisiana State University Department of Archives.
- Reber, Thomas (1909). "Proud old Natchez;" history and romance. Natchez printing and stationery co.
- Regan, Joe (2017). "Half-Irish and All Slave". History Ireland. 25 (5): 24–27. ISSN 0791-8224. JSTOR 90014598.
- Scarborough, William Kauffman (2012) [2003]. Masters of the Big House: Elite Slaveholders of the Mid-Nineteenth-Century South. Baton Rouge: Louisiana State University Press. ISBN 9780807156001. LCCN 2003007301. OCLC 846496079. Project MUSE book 23668.
