= Don José Vidal =

Spanish-colonial Louisianan (1763–1823)

- Born: March 12, 1763; A Coruña, Spain
- Died: August 22, 1823 (aged 60); New Orleans, Louisiana, U.S.

Don José Vidal (March 12, 1763, in A Coruña, Spain – August 22, 1823, in New Orleans, Louisiana) was a Spanish grandee who served in many different roles during the last decade of Louisiana's colonial period.

== Biography ==
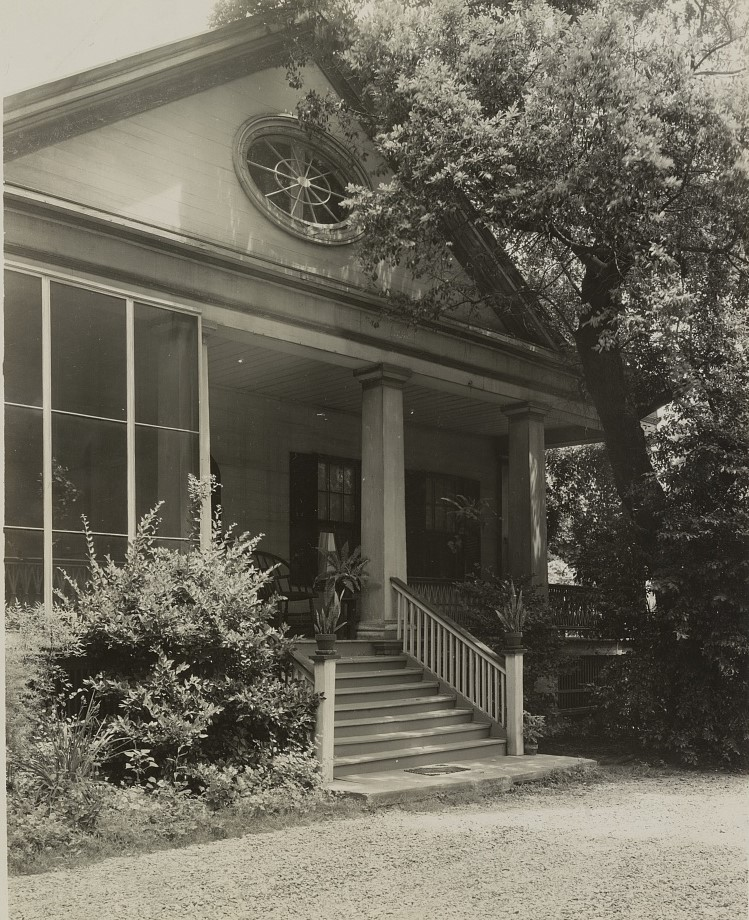
Cottage garden, ca. 1790, Natchez, by Frances Benjamin Johnston, 1938. Home of the Foster family. At one time owned by Jose Vidal, acting Gov. of Natchez Territory

=== Early life ===
Don José Vidal was born on March 12, 1765, in A Coruña, Spain.

=== Career ===
He was secretary to Manuel Gayoso de Lemos, the Spanish Governor of the Natchez District from 1792-1797.

He preferred to remain on Spanish territory, and petitioned the Spanish Governor-General Manuel Gayoso de Lemos for a land grant across the Mississippi River from Natchez. Gayoso granted the petition, with the stipulation that Vidal erect a “strong house” (fort) on the property. In 1798 Don Jose moved his family from Natchez across the river and became the Commandant of the new Post of Concordia. Don Vidal also worked to develop a town at the fort, building the first steam-powered sawmill. He also owned a cotton gin and blacksmith shop – facilities to support the town. Concordia Parish later derived its name from the fort. The town was called Concord by 1801. The Orleans Territorial legislature in 1811 changed the name of the city to Vidalia after its founder. Vidal had donated land along the river to the city, where its civic buildings were later constructed. He also donated land for the first school in Concordia Parish.

He lived most of his later years in Vidalia, although he went to New Orleans on business.

=== Personal life ===
He was married and had children.

=== Death ===
He died August 22, 1823, in New Orleans, Louisiana. He was buried in the Natchez City Cemetery.

== See also ==
- Samuel Davis (Louisiana planter), a son-in-law
