= Lansdowne (Natchez, Mississippi) =

Historic house in Mississippi, United States

- U.S. National Register of Historic Places
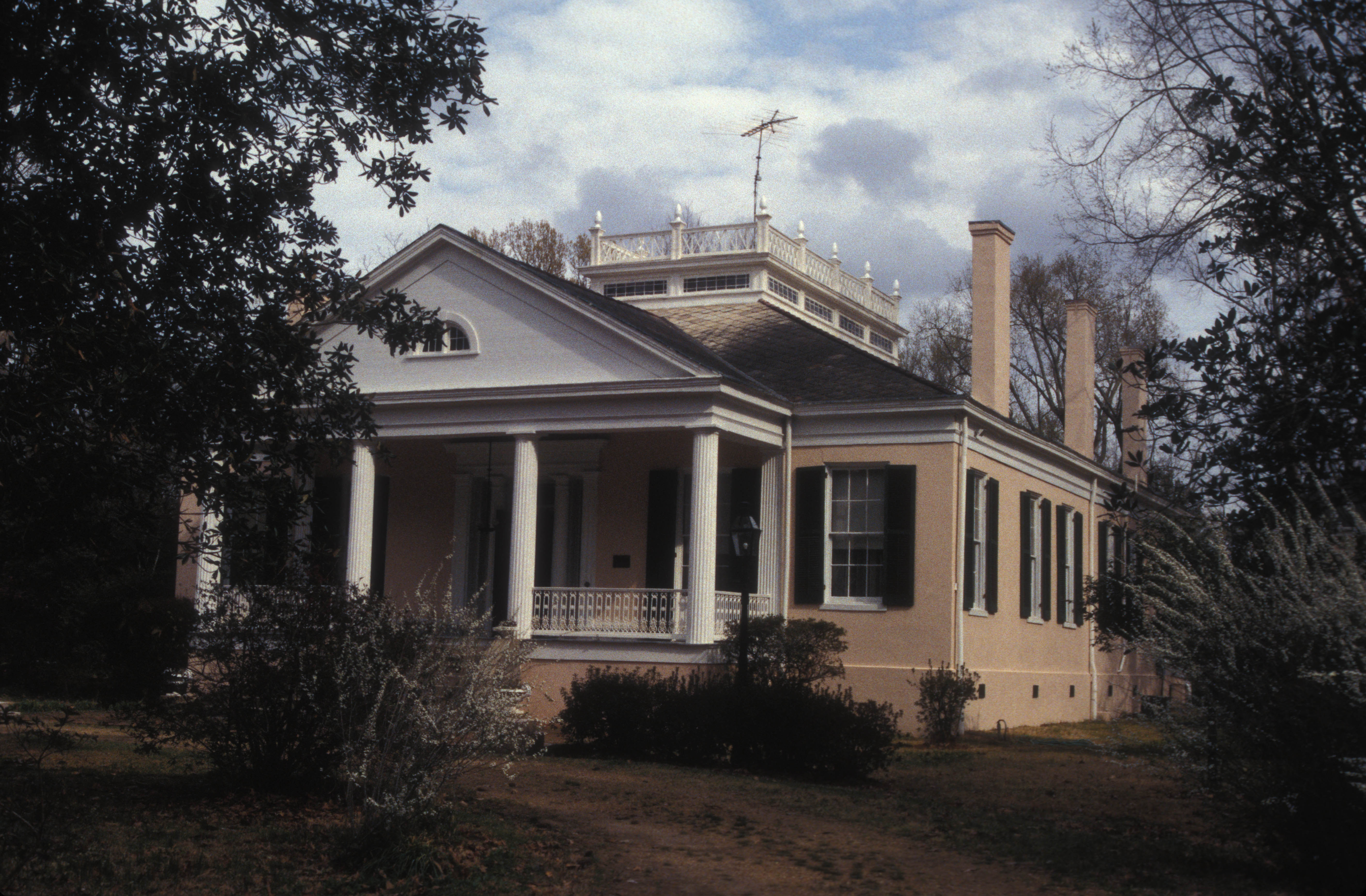
- Lansdowne in 2006

- Location within Mississippi Location within the United States
- Location: 17 Marshall Road, Natchez, Mississippi
- Coordinates: 31°35′5.2″N 91°21′42.8″W
- Area: 120 acres (49 ha)
- Built: 1853
- Architectural style: Greek Revival
- NRHP reference No.: 78001581
- Added to NRHP: July 24, 1978

Lansdowne is a historic estate that is listed on the National Register of Historic Places in Natchez, Mississippi, in the United States. The property began as a 727-acre antebellum estate modeled on the lifestyle ideals of the English landed gentry. After the American Civil War, Lansdowne continued operating as a cotton plantation, producing cotton, corn, sheep, and cattle until about 1960. The plantation house and 120 acres of the original estate are still owned and occupied by the descendants of the original owners, who open it periodically for tours.

== Location ==
Lansdowne is located on M.L. King Jr. Road (Formerly Pine Ridge Road), one mile north of the Natchez city limits (The driveway into the property is now known as Marshall Road). Lansdowne adjoined the Homewood estate.

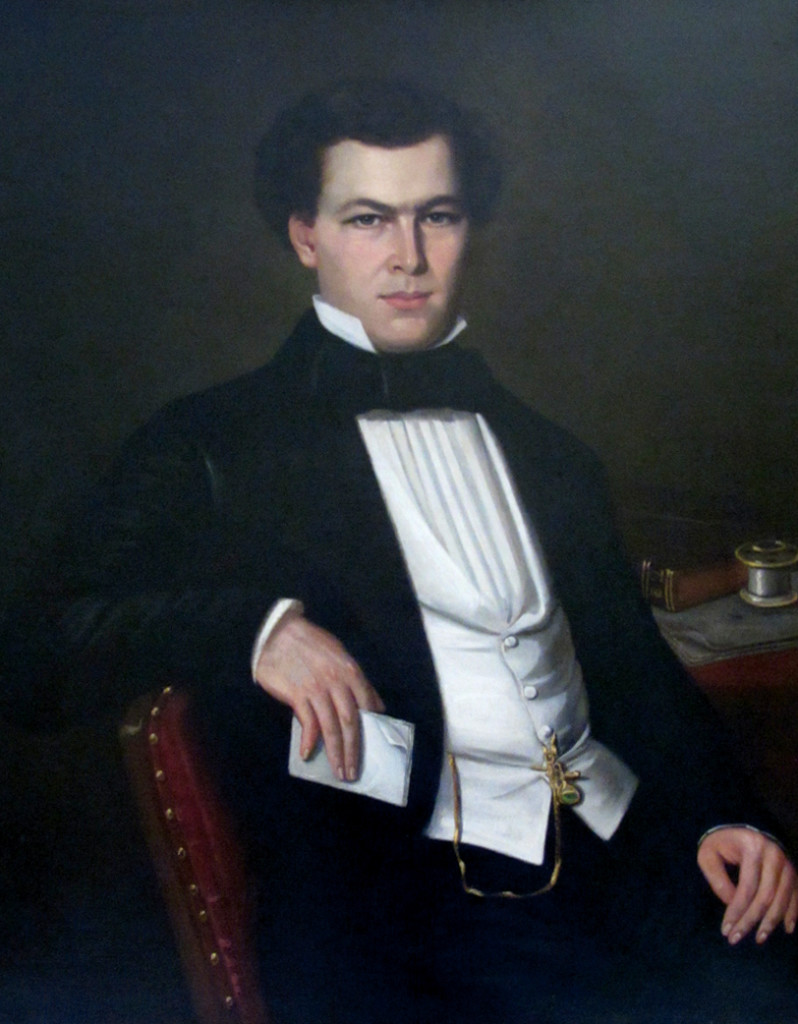
Portrait of George Matthews Marshall, ca. 1855, by Louis Joseph Bahin

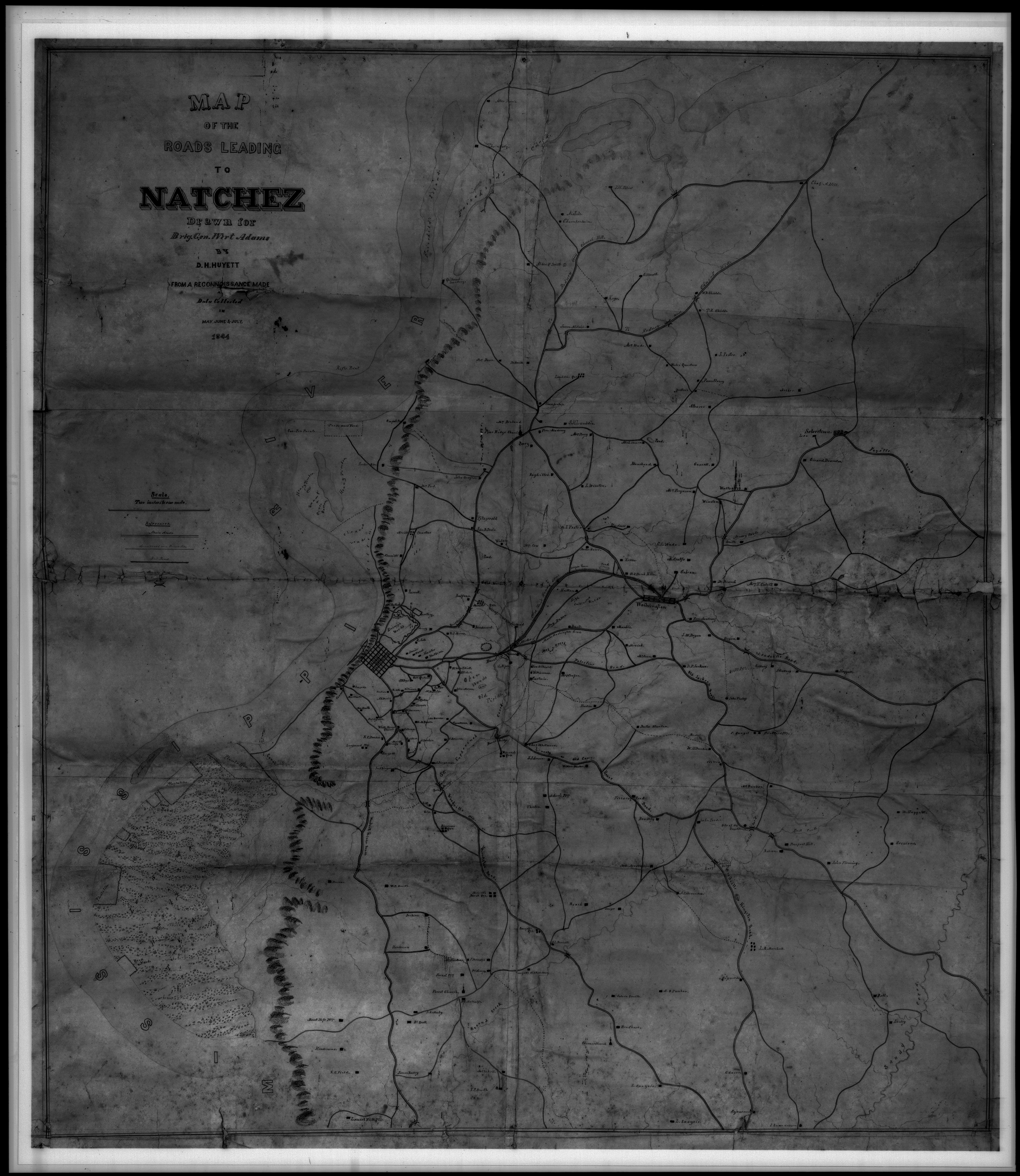
The name "Geo Marshall" on this map, just above and to the right of the city of Natchez - between the name Balfour (Charlotte's sister Catherine Balfour's Homewood estate with 9 enslaved Africans in 1860) and a Pond along the road - is where Lansdowne is located. The name "Archer" in the upper-right area of the map is where Charlotte's sister, Mary Ann, and her husband, James Archer, lived on their Oakwood Plantation, with 98 enslaved Africans, in 1860. The name Marshall just below Natchez is the Richmond estate where George's father lived in 1860.

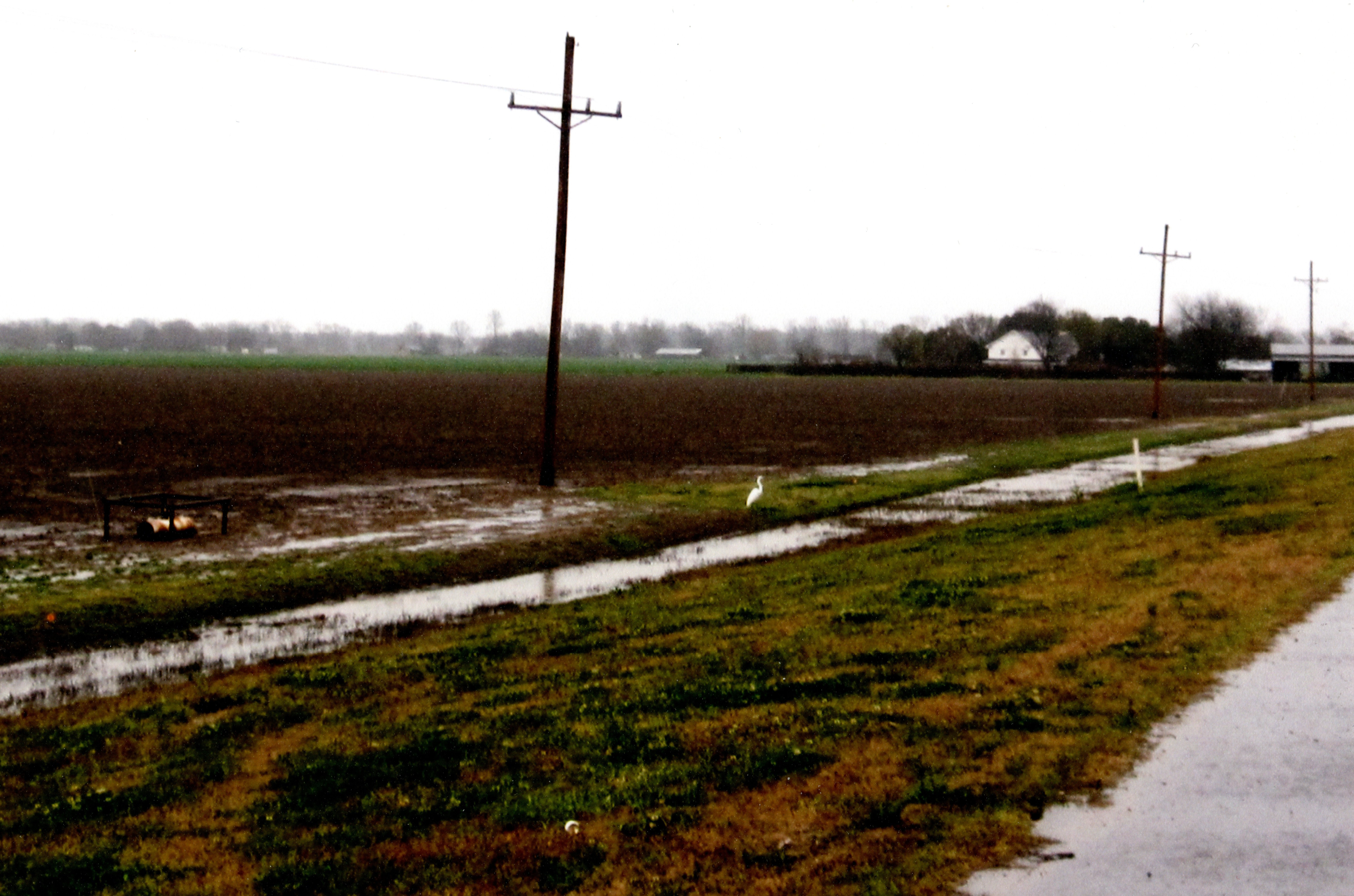
Scene looking away from the Mississippi River on Maxwell Road in Concordia Parish, LA near the Arcola and Hole in the Wall Plantation sites.

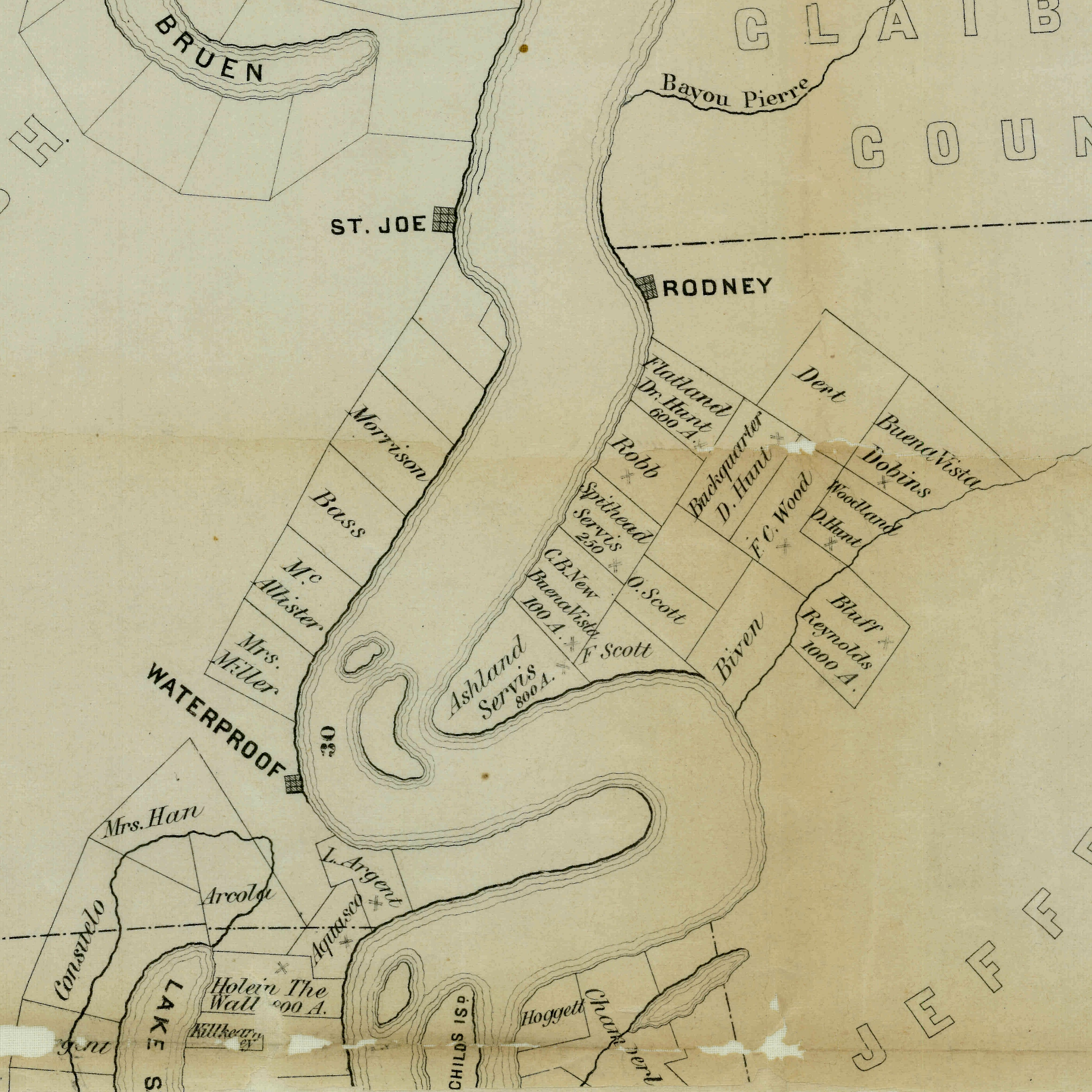
Map showing Arcola Plantation and some of the other Hunt family plantations - Hole in the wall (Charlotte's sister Elizabeth Ogden inherited it from her parents after the Civil War), Woodlawn (misspelled as Woodland on the map, residence of Charlotte's parents - Ann and David Hunt), Brick Quarters, Flatland, Calviton ("E.G.Wood" on the map, where David Hunt's grandchildren by his son Abijah lived with their step-father Edgar Gilliam Wood).

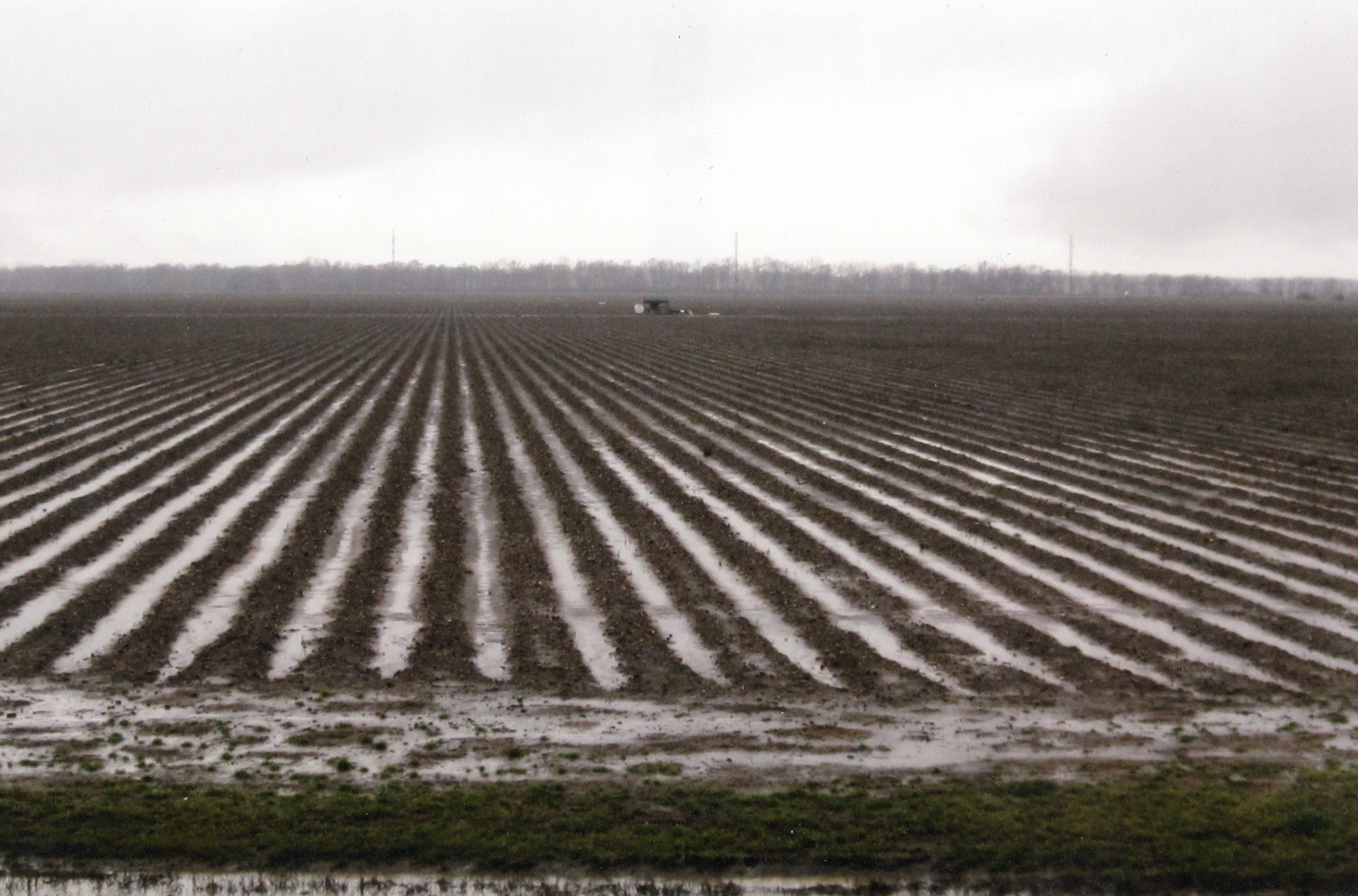
Cotton Field on Maxwell Road in northern Concordia Parish, near Arcola and Hole-In-the-Wall Plantations

== Antebellum history ==
The property became known as Lansdowne when Charlotte Hunt and her new husband George Matthews Marshall, a Princeton University graduate, built an expansive Greek Revival residence on the 727 acres in 1852–1853. The estate was named after the Marshalls' English acquaintance, the Marquess of Lansdowne, reflecting the aspirations of many wealthy Southern planter families to emulate English aristocratic culture.

George and Charlotte's wealth originated largely from plantation agriculture and their families' exploitation of enslaved African labor. Charlotte's father, Jefferson County, Mississippi planter David Hunt, one of the wealthiest Americans in 1860, gave five of his seven children who reached adulthood before the Civil War $70,000 (by his valuation) in estate assets. He lived a few miles from Lansdowne on Woodlawn Plantation. Each married child received at least one plantation, the enslavement of approximately 100 Africans, and a set of silver from Baltimore. Thus, Charlotte received the Lansdowne property on the high ground near Natchez for her home, and Arcola cotton plantation in the very fertile flood-prone land of Tensas Parish near the Mississippi River town of Waterproof as a source of plantation income generated through enslaved labor.

George's father, banker and planter Levin R. Marshall, also among the wealthiest enslaving planters and financiers in the United States before the Civil War, likely helped finance George's residence on Lansdowne, as well as, in expanding Arcola plantation. Levin R. Marshall lived at the suburban Natchez estate known as Richmond.

In 1860 George's plantation holdings in Louisiana and Mississippi were valued at $319,000 (~$9.06 million in 2024). This dollar amount did not include much of his earned and inherited wealth.

The following is more information about the (approximately $91,000) 727-acre Lansdowne Estate in Adams County, Mississippi, in 1860.

- The land was previously known as the Nathaniel Ivy tract, and next as the home of Robert Dunbar (who was the father of Joseph Dunbar (politician)). Dunbar was the patriarch of the rich, planter clan known as the country Dunbars - no relation to the city Dunbars, who owned the Forrest Plantation. Robert Dunbar moved away to his Oakley Grove Plantation (at the site of the current Adams County Airport). The land was eventually passed down through Dunbar's descendants to Charlotte Hunt - the line being: Robert Dunbar; Jane (Dunbar) Ferguson, whose husband David's parents owned Mount Locust Plantation; Ann (Ferguson) Hunt; and Charlotte (Hunt) Marshall.
- George Marshall had $75,000 in real estate in Adams County in 1860, which included the 727 acres and buildings of Lansdowne.
- George Marshall had $16,000 in personal property in Adams County in 1860, which included sixteen enslaved Africans, the livestock and equipment on Lansdowne.
  - Susan Gruby Washington was an African woman who the Marshalls enslaved at Lansdowne, abducted from Guinea, Africa. She continued to work for the Marshall family after emancipation as a nurse to their children. She was married to Robert the butler. They lived in the two rooms of the second floor of the kitchen building, with the cook immediately behind the main house. She died on February 25, 1918, and was buried in the cemetery there.
  - Benjamin Chaney, Ellen Pippin, and York Pippin were among the people enslaved by the Marshalls at Lansdowne, according to an account by Susan Gruby Washington, which was found on ancestry.com.

The following is more information about (the approximately $254,000) Arcola cotton plantation in Tensas Parish, Louisiana in 1860, which supported Lansdowne.

- The land probably passed from the business firm of Abijah Hunt and Elijah Smith to Abijah's nephew David Hunt, and then on to David's daughter Charlotte Hunt and her husband George Marshall. An early 1800s land survey on the Bureau of Land Management website lists "A. Hunt & E. Smith" as the owners of a 623-acre tract that was part of Arcola Plantation. David Hunt inherited his Uncle Abijah's real estate and also bought out the other owners in the Hunt and Smith firm. Then he would sometimes expand the various properties by purchasing adjacent land. Thus, this is the most likely way that the Arcola Plantation was created.
- Value of Real Property (land - 1,000 improved and 700 unimproved acres - and other non-moveable objects) $119,000
- Value of Personal Property - $135,000
  - $55,000 worth of implements and machinery
  - 125 enslaved Africans housed in 28 dwellings
  - $7,940 worth of livestock, which included four horses, 41 mules, 16 milch cows, 23 working oxen, 25 sheep, 150 swine, 30 cattle
  - 1,000 bales of ginned cotton - 400 pounds each, 6,000 bushels of Indian corn, 100 pounds of wool, 50 bushels of peas and beans, 50 bushels of Irish potatoes, 300 bushels of sweet potatoes, $500 of slaughtered meat

Twelve Years a Slave is a book (the full text is available for free on the Project Gutenberg website) that describes the conditions enslaved people suffered, including those the Marshalls enslaved on the Lansdowne Estate and at Arcola plantation. According to the book, if the Marshalls were displeased with one of the enslaved domestic workers on an estate such as Lansdowne, they would subject them to the harsher labor conditions of large-scale cotton cultivation as a enslaved field laborer on a place like Arcola plantation.

== American Civil War and Reconstruction ==
George Marshall fought in the Confederate military against the United States the American Civil War. He was wounded at the Battle of Shiloh, returned home, and hired a substitute to serve in his place, a practice available to wealthier Confederates. During the war, on January 8, 1865, eleven Union soldiers broke into Lansdowne to rob the Marshalls. They did not get much because the butler, Robert, had hidden the Marshalls' silver under the floor of the mansion. In frustration, the soldiers took a few pieces of the Marshalls' china and smashed it along the road as they left.

After emancipation ended slavery, formerly enslaved laborers and other agricultural workers were increasingly drawn into sharecropping arrangements; many plantations that had depended on enslaved labor failed. In general, the children of David Hunt had to sell off Cincinnati, Ohio, real estate investments inherited from their father, and take out mortgages on their plantations to restore their agricultural operations and recover financially after the collapse of the slave-based plantation economy.

After the American Civil War of 1861–1865, the Marshalls sold the Arcola plantation; Lansdowne then became a plantation, with cotton, corn, sheep, and cattle raised there until about 1960. At times, the Marshall descendants relied on the small income from the sale of butter and eggs from their farming operation to help keep them going. Beginning in 1932 during the Great Depression, opening antebellum plantation homes in Natchez to paying tourists, including Lansdowne, during the annual Pilgrimage tours brought in an important source of income. A cotton plantation scene from the movie Show Boat (1951 film) was filmed on Lansdowne Plantation. During the 1950s the Marshall descendants sold off the last of their cotton land. Lansdowne has been added to the National Register of Historic Places since July 24, 1978. In 1995 Devereaux Nobles and her brother George Marshall IV - both great-grandchildren of George Marshal I - owned Lansdowne. The owner's residence and 120 acres still belong to the Marshall descendants.

== Architecture ==
The residence, built ca. 1853, was designed in the Greek Revival architectural style. The exterior of the mansion conceals the scale of the interior rooms. It has high ceilings and a 65-foot-long center hall. The unusually large central hall is a notable feature of the design that is not found in many of the larger Natchez mansions. When entering from the front door into the center hall, on the left side of the center hall are the drawing room, dining room, and butler's pantry. A stairwell in the butler's pantry leads to storage rooms in the basement and attic. The basement had wine and dairy cellars. The attic is finished off nicely with gaslight fixtures. On the right side of the center hall are three bedrooms. The planned second floor was never completed. Because of this, the planned library became the middle bedroom instead.

The home is important because it contains most of its many original interior decorative elements and furnishings with many items having been imported from Europe. The front parlor contains one of the most complete and well-preserved Rococo Revival style interiors in Mississippi from the mid-1800s. The home contains rare Zuber & Cie wallpaper, rosewood and mahogany furniture, and Egyptian marble mantelpieces. The rosewood parlor set and Zuber & Cie wallpaper were purchased by George Marshall I on a trip to France. Various cypress base boards are painted to resemble oak and marble. The bronze chandeliers were once powered by gas made in the plantation's gas works.

To keep the house livable, a bathroom was added to the end of the rear porch in the early 1900s, adjoining a bedroom. Electricity was added in the 1940s. In 1962, a kitchen was installed in the butler's pantry, and a second bathroom was added to one corner of the middle bedroom. This was done with as little damage to the original interiors as possible.

Two smaller structures flank the rear courtyard behind the house. Before emancipation, the north structure housed the kitchen and wash room on the first floor; and living quarters for enslaved domestic workers, including the cook, butler, and children’s nurse. The south structure housed the billiard room and office on the first floor, and the schoolroom and governess's room on the second floor. The north and south buildings have been updated into housing for visiting relatives and paying guests.

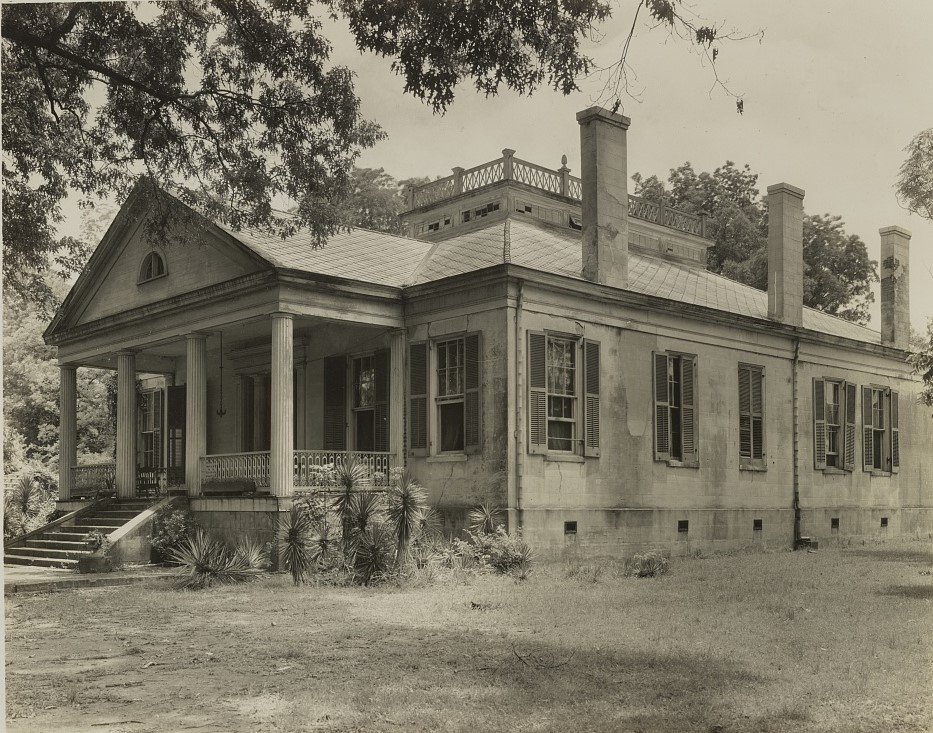
Lansdowne, by Frances Benjamin Johnston, 1938, during the Great Depression

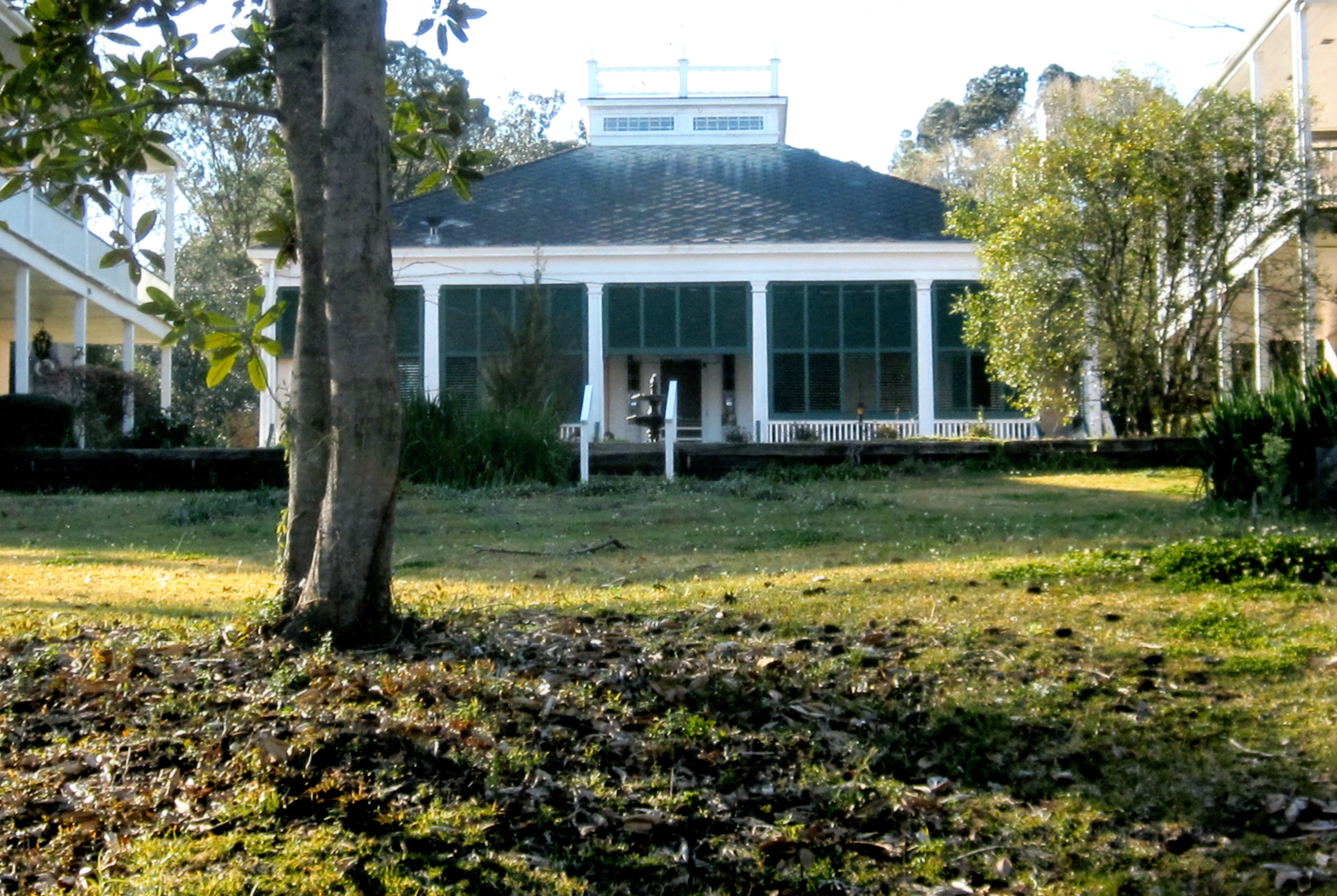
Rear view of the mansion on Lansdowne Plantation

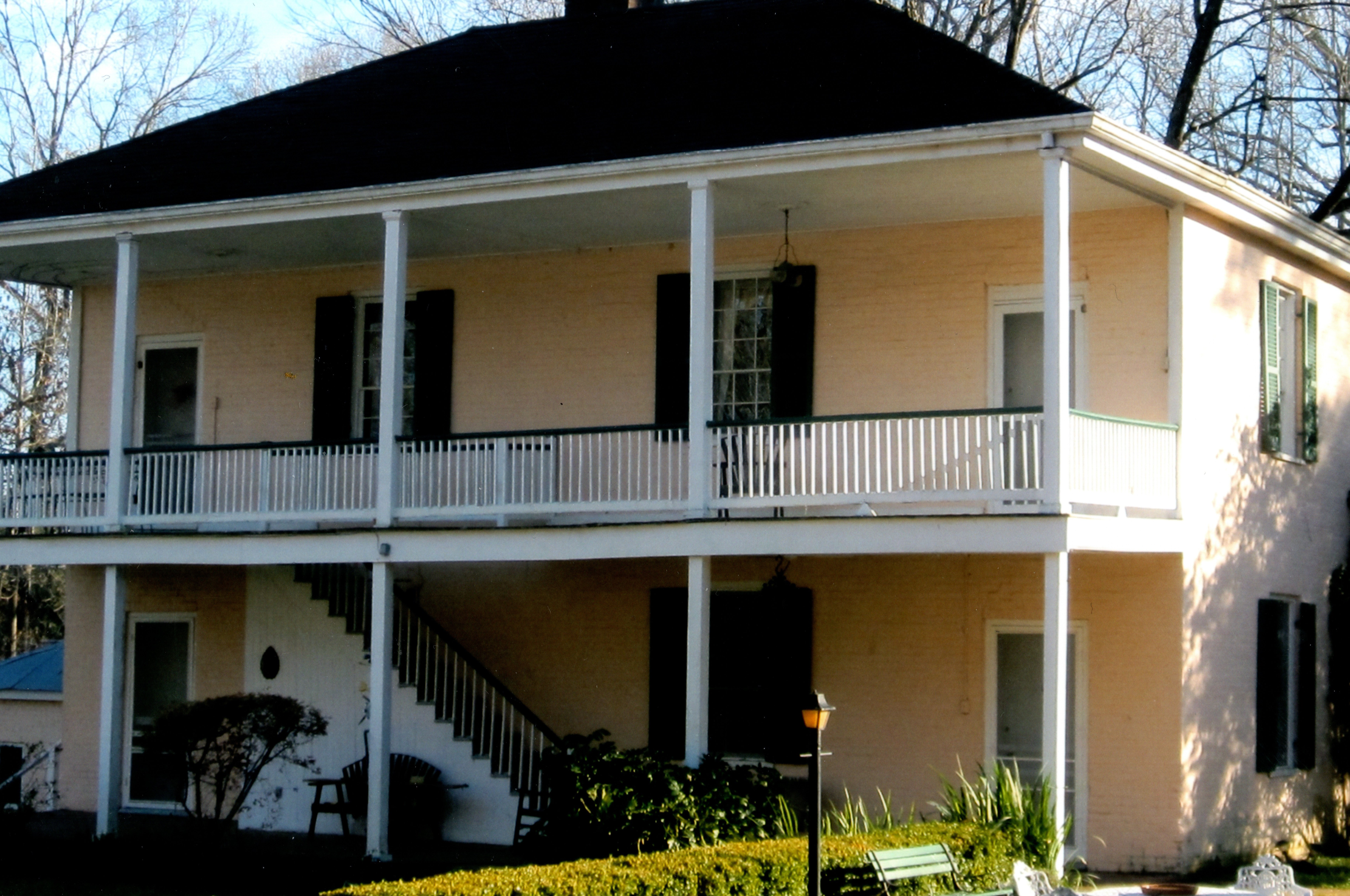
The south building behind the big house at Lansdowne 2013 - originally the billiard hall, office, school room, and governess' room

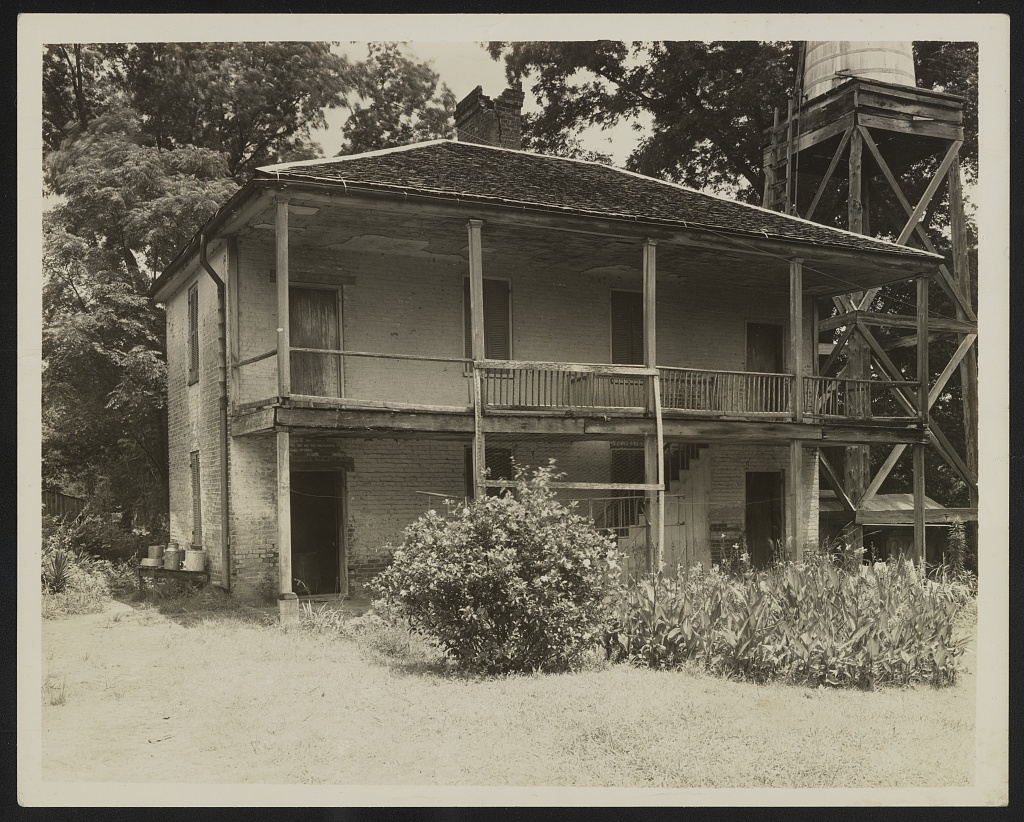
The north building behind the big house at Lansdowne in 1938 - originally the kitchen, wash room, and quarters for the cook, butler, and children's nurse

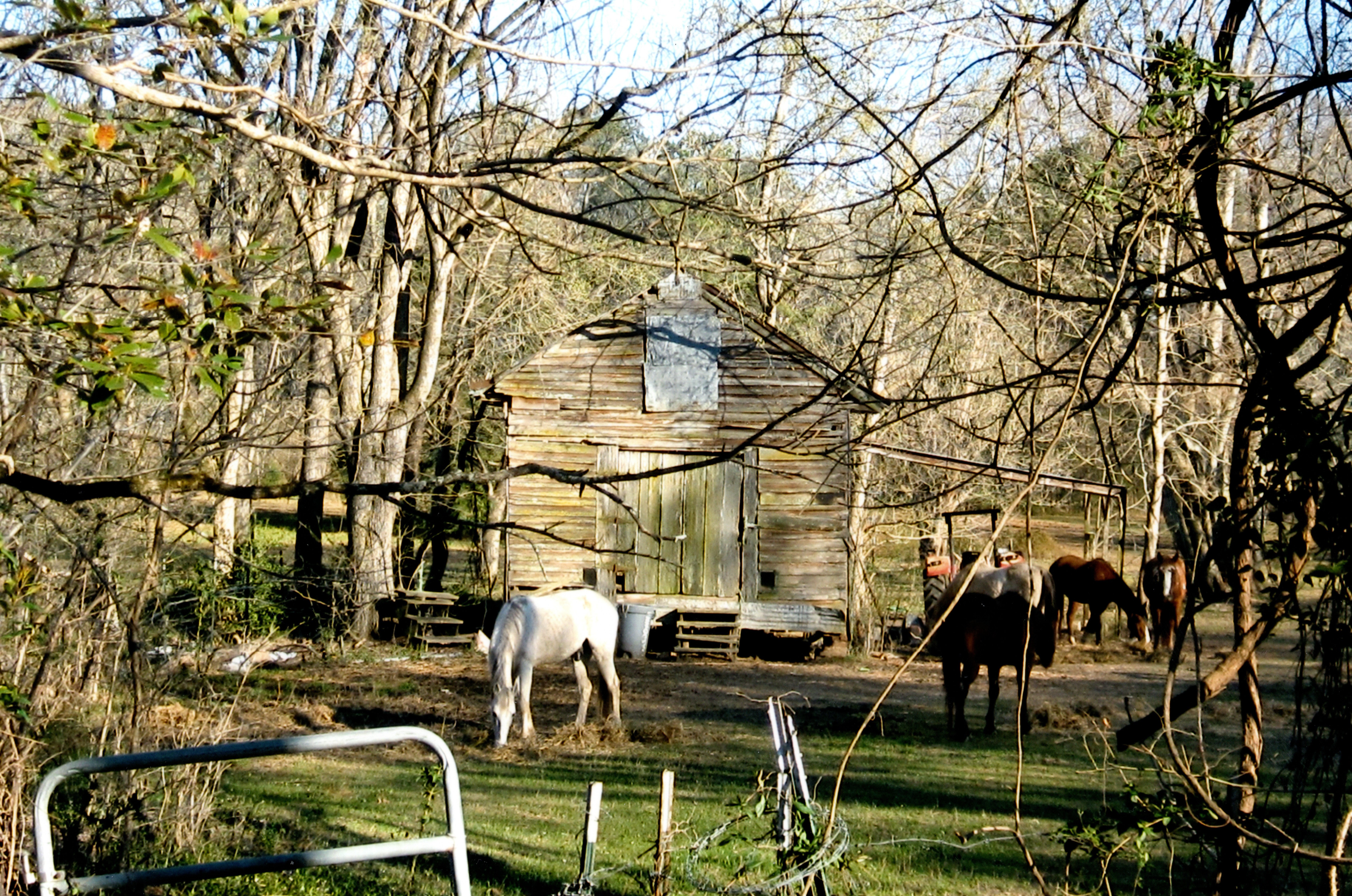
Farm Building directly behind the Lansdowne Mansion

== See also ==
- Abijah Hunt
- African-American history
- American gentry
- Atlantic slave trade
- Casa-Grande & Senzala (similar concept in Brazilian plantations)
- David Hunt (planter)
- History of the Southern United States
- Homewood Plantation (Natchez, Mississippi)
- Journal of a Residence on a Georgian Plantation in 1838–1839
- Landed gentry
- List of the oldest buildings in Mississippi
- List of plantations in Mississippi
- List of plantations in the United States
- Lost Cause of the Confederacy
- Plantation complexes in the Southern United States
- Plain Folk of the Old South (1949 book by historian Frank Lawrence Owsley)
- Plantation-era songs
- Plantation house
- Plantation tradition (genre of literature)
- Plantations of Leon County (Florida)
- Planter class
- Sharecropping in the United States
- Slavery at Tuckahoe plantation
- Slavery in the United States
- Treatment of slaves in the United States
- Twelve Years a Slave
- White supremacy
- Woodlawn Plantation (Jefferson County, Mississippi)
- Commons:Category:Old maps of plantations in the United States
