= Levin R. Marshall =

American banker, planter

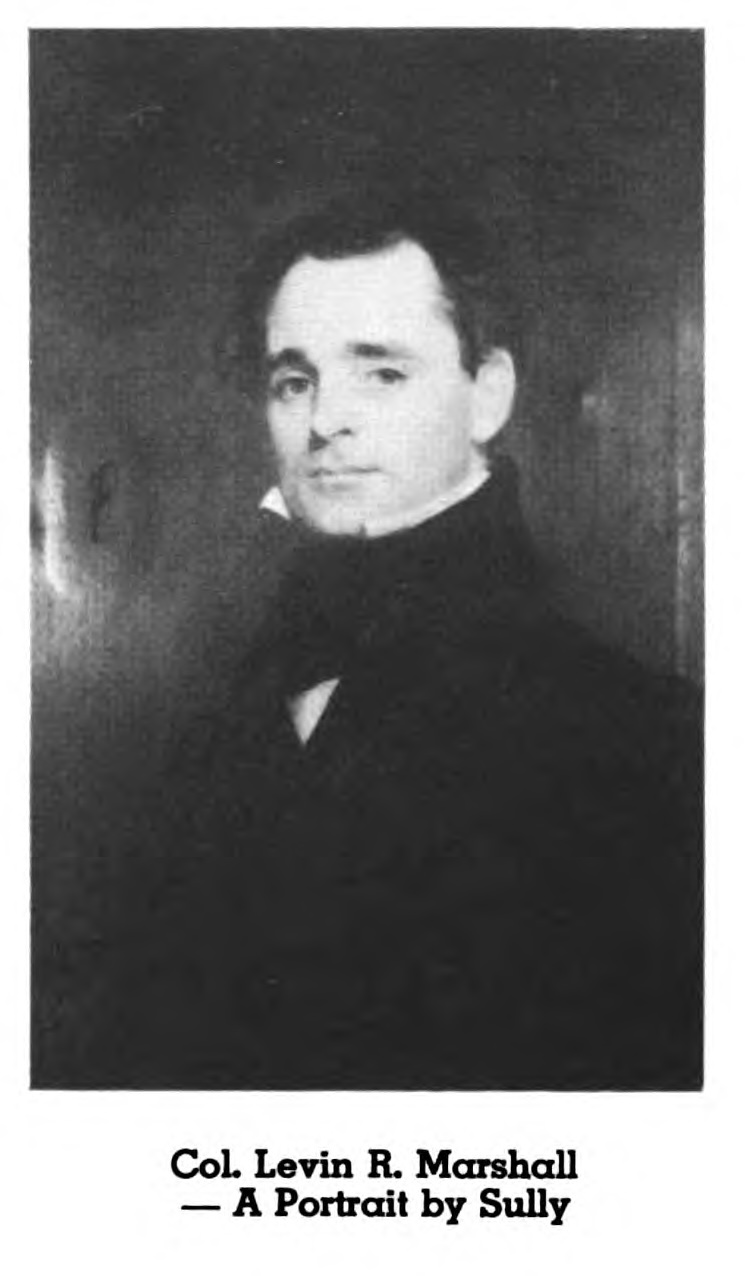
- From They found it in Natchez (1939) by Theodora Britton Marshall
- Born: October 10, 1800; Alexandria, Virginia
- Died: July 24, 1870 (aged 69)
- Occupations: Banker, planter
- Spouses: Maria Chotard Marshall; Sarah E. Elliott Ross Marshall
- Children: 12, including George Matthews Marshall
- Parent: Henry Marshall
- Relatives: Stephen Minor (grandfather)

Levin R. Marshall (October 10, 1800 – July 24, 1870) was an American banker and planter in the Antebellum South. He was a founder and President of the Commercial Bank of Natchez, Mississippi. He owned 14,000 acres (5,700 ha) in Mississippi and Louisiana, and 10,000 acres (4,000 ha) in Arkansas.

== Early life ==
Levin R. Marshall was born October 10, 1800, in Alexandria, Virginia. His father, Henry Marshall, was from Maryland, and was some relation to Chief Justice John Marshall. His maternal grandfather, Stephen Minor, was a prominent planter.

== Career ==
Marshall was said to have come to Wilkinson County, Mississippi Territory in 1817. Marshall started his career as a banker for the United States bank in Woodville, Mississippi. In 1831, he moved to Natchez, Mississippi, where he continued his work as a banker, serving as cashier of the local branch of the Second Bank of the United States. He then established his own bank, the Commercial Bank of Natchez. Marshall also owned the Mansion Hotel in Natchez and worked for the commission house J. B. Byrne & Co. of New Orleans, Louisiana as well as Marshall, Reynolds, and Co. of Natchez. In 1825, he led a group of local children to welcome Gilbert du Motier, Marquis de Lafayette to Natchez.

Marshall owned many cotton and sugar plantations in Mississippi, Louisiana, and Arkansas. Indeed, he owned five plantations in Mississippi and Louisiana which spanned 14,000 acres (5,700 ha), and 10,000 acres (4,000 ha) in Arkansas. Marshall was one of the South's largest slaveholders; in 1850, Marshall enslaved 629 people held in four counties in three states.

By the 1850s, he produced more than 4,000 bales of cotton every year. In 1860, he owned 817 African slaves. He also owned a large livestock herd. For a time, Henry Wirz worked as an overseer on one of Marshall's plantations in Louisiana; Wirz would later serve in the Confederate Army as commandant of the notorious prisoner-of-war camp known as Andersonville.

== Personal life ==
- In 1826, in Woodville, Mississippi, Marshall married Maria Chotard (1807–1834), the daughter of John Marie Chotard, and a cousin of William Minor. They had four children, only one of whom survived: George Matthews Marshall, who later married Charlotte Hunt, the daughter of planter David Hunt, and resided at the Lansdowne estate. Portraits of Levin R. Marshall by Thomas Sully and George M. Marshall painted by Louis Joseph Bahin hang in the dining room at Lansdowne.
- Marshall married second to Sarah E. Elliott Ross, daughter of Dr. Elliott, sister of William St. John Elliot, and widow of Isaac Ross Jr., son of Isaac Ross. They had eight children. They resided at Richmond in Natchez, and also maintained Hawkswood, a residence in Pelham Bay, New York. One of their sons married a granddaughter of William Dunbar of Forest Plantation and is buried at the Dunbar family cemetery.

== Death ==
Marshall died on July 24, 1870, at the age of 69.

== Sources ==
- Mulvihill, Lelia H. (1946). Private Cemeteries in Adams County, Mississippi (Reprint ed.). Salem, Massachusetts: Higginson Book Company.
- Rothstein, Morton (1979). "The Changing Social Networks and Investment Behavior of a Slaveholding Elite in the Ante Bellum South: Some Natchez Nabobs, 1800–1860". In Greenfield, Sidney M.; Strickon, Arnold; Aubey, Robert T. (eds.). Entrepreneurs in Cultural Context. School of American Research, Advanced Seminar Series. Albuquerque: University of New Mexico Press. pp. 65–88. ISBN 978-0-8263-0504-6. LCCN 78021433. OCLC 4859059.
