= Louis Joseph Bahin =

American painter (1813–1857)

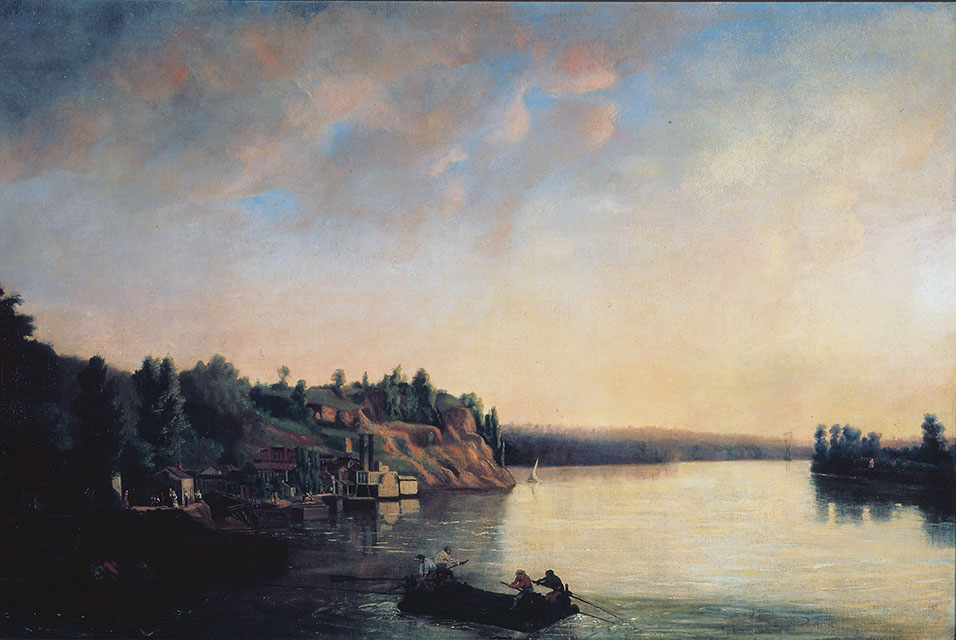
- Natchez under the Hill (1852) by Bahin, oil on canvas, Morris Museum of Art, US
- Born: October 6, 1813; Armentières, France
- Died: June 27, 1857 (aged 43); Mississippi, U.S.
- Occupation: Painter
- Spouse: Josephine Carementrand
- Relatives: John Cameron Monjo (great-great grandson); Justin Monjo (great-great-great grandson)

Louis Joseph Bahin (October 6, 1813 – June 27, 1857) was a French-born American painter in the Antebellum South who painted landscapes and portraits.

== Biography ==
Bahin was born on October 6, 1813, in Armentières. He exhibited his paintings in Marseille, Southern France, from 1832 to 1845. He also won a first-place prize from the Society of the Artis in Paris, for a self-portrait.

Bahin later moved to New Orleans, where he established a studio; he also worked in Natchez, Mississippi. He painted socialites of the Antebellum South. For example, he did a portrait of planter George M. Marshall, which is exhibited in the dining room of Lansdowne, his family mansion. He also painted politician John A. Quitman in a full-body portrait which was commissioned by the Natchez local government.

His work can also be found in public galleries and museums. For example, his painting, Natchez Under the Hill, is exhibited at the Morris Museum of Art in Augusta, Georgia. Other paintings can be found at the Abby Aldrich Rockefeller Folk Art Museum in Williamsburg, Virginia, the Mississippi Department of Archives and History in Jackson, Mississippi, and the Western Reserve Historical Society in Cleveland, Ohio.

Prior to his move to the United States, Bahin married to Fanny Josephine Carementrand—a native of Mantua—having two sons together. He died on June 27, 1857, aged 43, in Mississippi. His great-great grandson is diplomat John Cameron Monjo and his great-great-great grandson is actor and screenwriter Justin Monjo.

== Paintings ==
- Uyatt Crittenden Webb Family, Georgetown, Kentucky (c. 1835)
- Henry LeGrand Conner (1803–1848) (circa 1840s)
- Portrait of a Young Girl (circa 1840–50)
- Louis Joseph Bahin (1813–1857) (1847)
- Gustave Joseph Bahin (1841–1913) (c. 1848)
- Portrait of George M. Marshall, I (1848–1857)
- Young Lady in a French Kitchen (1852)
- Mrs Louis Joseph Bahin (1811–1861) (1852)
- Henry Clay (1852)
- Natchez Under the Hill (1852)
- Mary Savage Conner Blake (1827–1893) (c. 1852)
- Anna Frances Conner (1835–1852) (circa 1852)
- Joseph Dunbar Shields (1854)
- Young Man in the Bahin Family (1854)
- Mrs. Miles Harper (Samantha Ford) (1859)
- John Ford Harper (1859)
- Truman Holmes, Jr. (1864)
