= Alvarez Fisk =

Mississippi businessman (1784–1853)

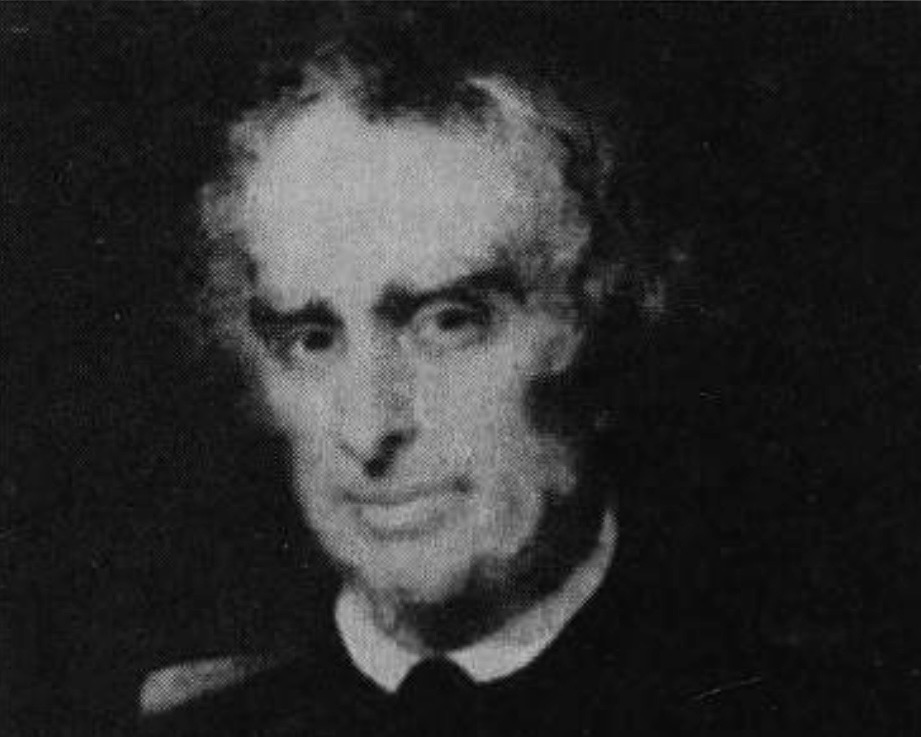
- Born: January 19, 1784; Billerica, Massachusetts
- Died: November 15, 1853 (aged 69); Madison Parish, Louisiana
- Burial place: Natchez City Cemetery

Alvarez Fisk (January 19, 1784–November 15, 1853) was an American cotton broker, plantation owner, merchant-financier, and enslaver of the antebellum U.S. South. Originally from Massachusetts, he and two brothers moved to the Natchez District in the early 19th century and became wealthy. He was a philanthropist in later life. He and his brother Abijah Fisk were key figures in the beginnings of the New Orleans Public Library.

== Early life ==
Alvarez Fisk was the oldest of eight children born to Alice Adams and Abijah Fiske of Waltham, Massachusetts. His father was a veteran of the American Revolutionary War. According to an obituary for one of his sons, the father "was a respectable farmer, a man of great moral worth and patriotism, who served his country for more than five years, during the revolutionary war of 1775, as a soldier in the army and navy of the United States—in the latter on board the Oliver Cromwell, a vessel of war from the state of Connecticut, on board of which vessel he was taken prisoner after a desperate action, in which she was captured by a British ship of war, and carried into New York while that place was in possession of the British forces. Notwithstanding he was severely wounded, which disabled him in a great degree for life, he was carried on board the prison ship and there confined for many months, suffering almost every hardship which can be conceived possible for any one thus circumstanced to endure. Yet he recovered, and once more, after the close of the war, returned to his farm at Waltham, where he was married to Miss Alice Adams, one of the descendants from the ancestors of the late John Adams, formerly President of the United States, where he continued for many years to till the ground with his own hands."

His parents were married in September 1783, he was born in January 1784. According to Olive Otis of New Orleans, who in 1892 wrote the most detailed surviving biography of Fisk, his family's hometown was Billerica but "at the age of 12 years Alvarez Fisk, disliking the uneventful life he led, ran away from home to Boston, where he sought work and secured the position of office boy in a large commercial firm. The elder Fisk became convinced that his boy's inclinations leaned towards a business career and permitted him to remain in the position that he had selected. Young Alvarez, by industry, coupled with an unusual capacity for business, soon won the confidence of his employers. He was advanced through all the grades of the office and finally was sent, with a consignment of goods, to New Orleans." (Note: Olive Otis was the pseudonym of Sallie Bass Land Jastremski (Mrs. Leon Jastremski), who was married to the editor of the Louisiana Review.)

Alvarez Fisk and the next-oldest brother, Abijah Fisk, emigrated to Natchez, Mississippi, and settled there when they were young. Alvarez Fisk soon became a "prominent merchant" in the riverside village.

== Business ==
Fisk is said to have practiced law in Natchez at the beginning of his career. Continuing the narrative of Olive Otis, "In 1819 a commercial firm was founded in this city bearing the title of A. & S. Fisk & Co., which continued to do a flourishing business until 1824, when disasters overtook the firm and it was forced into liquidation. Among the notices of this failure by the press of the city the following remarks were made by the Semi-Weekly Creole: 'From the fact that the house paid every liability against it, it placed the respective partners, especially Mr. Alvarez Fisk, in a very enviable and honorable position, giving him at once a standing for integrity, reputation and fair dealing, which subsequently served to raise him to the pinnacle of commercial fame and credit'."

The S. in A. & S. Fisk was younger brother Stebbins Fisk. Per Otis, Stebbins Fisk is credited with "introducing the present system of sampling cotton by exposing it on the tables in the offices instead of visiting the warehouses to secure samples. Stebbins was a handsome and accomplished man and died early in life at his native village, Billerica."

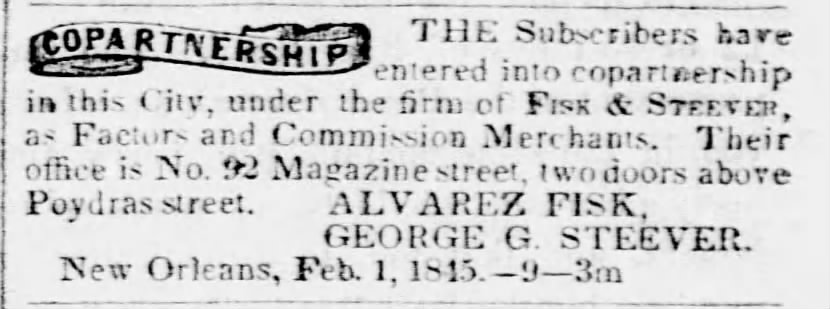
"Copartnership" The Weekly Mississippian, Jackson, Mississippi, May 7, 1845

Alvarez Fisk reportedly purchased several cotton plantations and entered cotton-commission business in the 1820s. Fisk later opened a branch of his brokerage house in New Orleans. He eventually moved offices, in 1821, "to the building now known as No. 88 Canal street." Fisk acted as a business agent for planters, for instance helping judge Edward Broughton sell his plantation on little Bayou Pierre in 1826. In 1854, "Idler" (probably one of the Watkins family and a hobbyist historian) gave partial credit to Fisk for the introduction of the Petit Gulf cultivar of cotton.

After reaching the highlands to the west of Rodney, the road traverses a succession of elevated ridges, occasionally intersected by ravines, that give variety to the scene, both pleasant and agreeable. On the right and lets are extensive plantations, on which the famous "Gulf Hill cotton" is grown. This cotton was the product of the celebrated "Mexican cotton seed," imported by the late Alvarez Fisk of Natchez, and by him distributed among the planters of Adams and Jefferson counties.

Having been preceded in arrival at New Orleans by Alvarez and Stebbins, "in 1830 the elder brother, Abijah Fisk, first appeared in the Crescent City. The first cargo of coffee that was ever imported from Rio Janeiro to New Orleans was to the account of Abijah Fisk and was consigned to the house of A. Fisk & Co. He was the senior partner in Fisk & Steever, based in Custom-house Street." In 1831 brother Stebbins Fisk was a director of the City Bank of New Orleans along with figures like Martin Duralde Jr., Antoine Cruzat, James P. Freret, and George Eustis. In 1831, Natchez nabob "Francis Surget borrowed $9,000 in short-term credit from the local branch of the national bank, which he used to pay creditors, such as cotton broker Alvarez Fisk." Surget had family connections to the bank directors, and in 1830 enslaved 95 people; by 1850,

he enslaved over 2,200 people. In 1832 Fisk named one of his plantations Belzoni, after Giovanni Belzoni. He laid out a town there, in what is now Humphreys County, and called it Fisk's Landing, but it is now known as Belzoni.

In 1833, Alvarez Fisk employed a young Yale Divinity graduate and fellow New Englander, Julius A. Reed, who had come south to work as a tutor but who was on the whole underwhelmed by Southern hospitality. Reed's preserved letters give historians insight into the lifestyle of the Natchez nabobs of the day. Reed worked for a few weeks as clerk at Fisk's cotton-commission firm in Natchez before he gave up on the south and returned north. Reed wrote home of Fisk's operation, "Their books are kept like the Bank books, & their transactions are almost as extensive, the balance sheet of the house in N. Orleans showing an amount exceeding six hundred thousand [US$600,000 (equivalent to $20,017,241 in 2025)]." In 1836, he bought what came to be known as Tally Ho plantation in Iberville Parish, Louisiana; in 1838 he and a partner sold the plantation, livestock, and 26 enslaved people to other investors.

In 1837, the sheriff of Warren County, Mississippi, decreed that "Stephen, Nace, Isaac, Lewis, Dave, Ellick, Sophia, Milla, Jenny, Sopha, Ann, Gustus, Lucy and Eliza, or so many of them as will pay and satisfy the decree in favor of the defendant, Alvarez Fisk," be auctioned to pay the debts owned him by the estate of Foster Cook.

In 1838, he was an investor in the New Orleans Steam Packet Company, which ran steamboats that carried mail "packets" on a regular schedule for the U.S. Mail. He was appointed an officer of the company alongside Stephen Duncan, James C. Wilkins, Levin Marshall, John Routh, Adam L. Bingaman, and William Minor. The company funded the construction of an "ocean-going vessel...built for them at a Brooklyn shipyard, christened the Natchez, and hailed with public enthusiasm when it arrived for its first cargo in late 1838. About 41,500 bales of cotton were shipped from Natchez in direct trade during the next year. Moreover, steam cotton compresses to repack bales for oceanic travel were set up in Natchez and Grand Gulf." In 1839 he sent a letter to Jackson Todd & Co., of Philadelphia, the firm of Washington Jackson.

By 1840, Fisk was among the most influential merchant-financiers working in Natchez. His major rival as banker to the nabob class was James C. Wilkins (who shared a surname with Fisk's wife). In 1850 there were five enslaved people listed within his Natchez household and six enslaved people listed under his name at New Orleans. Fisk dissolved his business partnership with George O. Steever in 1851. In March 1852 he sold a 15-year-old enslaved boy named Henderson to John Lobdell at New Orleans. In 1860, his estate owned a plantation in Tensas Parish, Louisiana.

== Houses ==
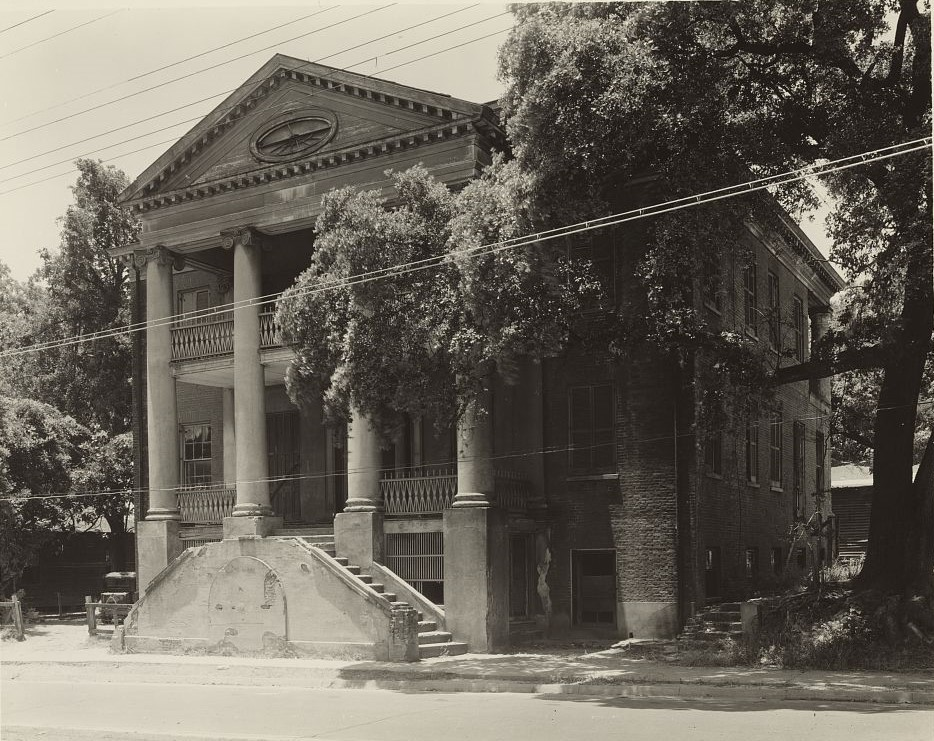
Fisk lived at the Neibert-Fisk House, better known today as Choctaw Hall, from 1844 until 1847

In 1844 he bought Choctaw Hall from the widow of Joseph Neibert. He owned a number of plantations but Choctaw was his town house. He also had a country house called Innismore, and with his brother Abijah, "owned a lovely mansion at Pass Christian, to which they made frequent excursions on one of the finest and most elegantly furnished sailing yachts afloat."

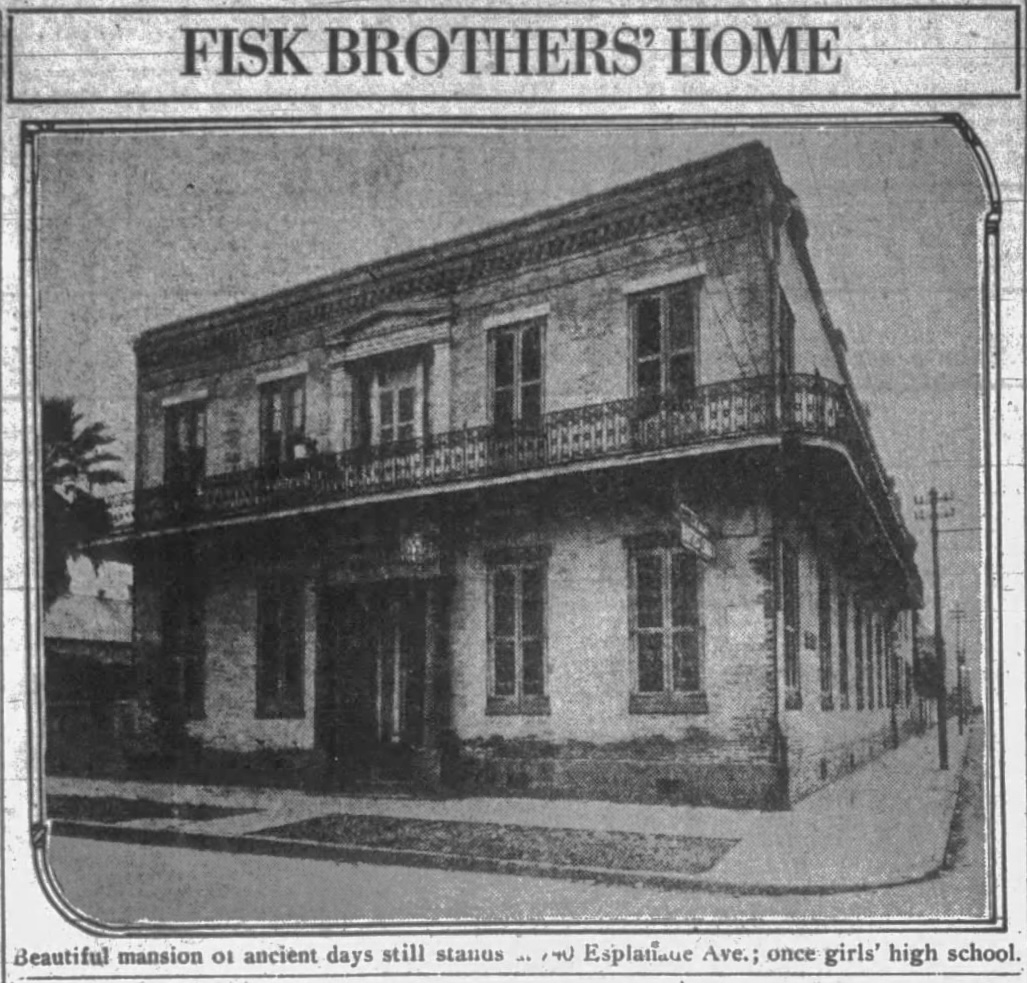
In 1922, the New Orleans States newspaper published this photo of the "Fisk Brothers' Home"

Fisk relocated from Natchez to New Orleans in 1847. In 1922, a New Orleans newspaper wrote that the Fisk home was "on Esplanade avenue at the corner of Bourbon street. The old number was 84, the present number 740." The author, John Coleman, described the luxe surroundings in which the family lived: "When the Fisk family lived there, parlors, dining room and hallways, up and down stairs, It is stated, were painted in fresco, not a vestige of which is to be seen on the walls or ceilings of the building today, although the work was executed by artists of note. It may be said that the whole house was a library of books, valuable by reason of their contents, and costly in binding. Beautifully carved bookcases were to be seen in nearly every, room of the house. Classic sculpture and paintings of the rarest art were there in pro-fusion. Fine silks, rare laces, and lovely jewels were worn there and the place was the home of music, art and culture. There were alcoves on either side of the hall, with a grand circular staircase leading to the second floor. The veranda opening on the garden was literally covered with Lamarque and Marechal Neil roses...In the center of the court yard was a fountain and surrounding it were flowers of singular brilliancy and beauty rising from their beds. Both court yard and garden, extending back to Barracks street, were enclosed by a high brick wall, surmounting which was an iron railing of exquisite design, the whole literally covered with wisteria, tea roses, Malmaison, verbenas, etc. But there is little of all this to be seen today. A ruined fountain and a tangled garden, greatly reduced in space, and the remains of a court yard overgrown with weeds, desolate and neglected, are all that is left of the magic beauty for which the Fisk garden was once famous." Before the civil war and Emancipation, "In the house on Esplanade avenue there were employed [enslaved?] as many as 25 servants, including a head butler, a seamstress, maids for the daughters of Alvarez, and a coachman, who drove one of the most stylish turnouts in the city."

According to the WPA's guide to New Orleans, published 1938, "730-740 Esplanade are sometimes referred to as the homes of the Fisk brothers...The buildings were never occupied by the brothers, but the corner building was erected by Edward Fisk in 1870, and the fine residence at 730 was once occupied by the widow of Alvarez Fisk."

== Politics ==
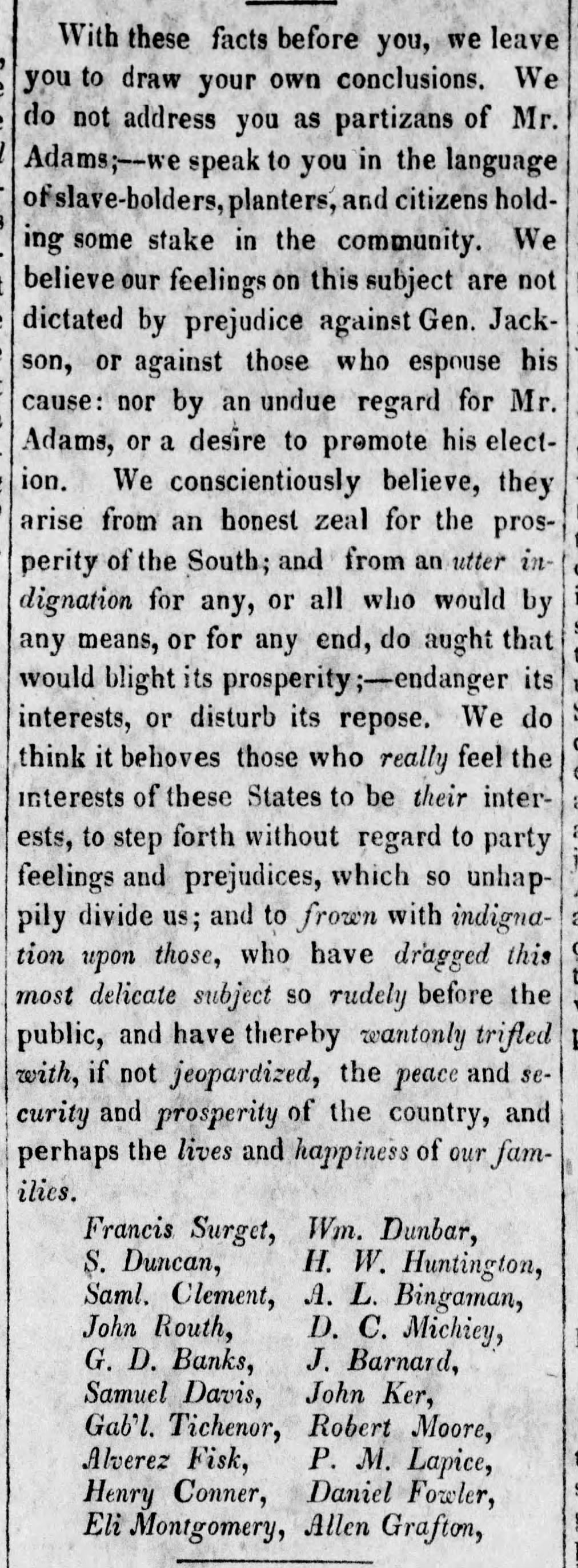
"With these facts before you..." Natchez Ariel, October 25, 1828

Politically he was a Whig. In 1828, he was party to a circular arguing against the election of Andrew Jackson to the presidency on the basis of "the violence of many of his adherents, as well as his own peculiar unfitness for the station." The letter was co-signed by Stephen Duncan, Beverly R. Grayson, Samuel Gustine, Francis Surget, Adam L. Bingaman, Felix Huston, and James K. Cook. Fisk co-sponsored a dinner for Henry Clay in 1830, along with Samuel Davis, Samuel Postlethwaite, John T. Griffith, Felix Huston, John A. Quitman, P. Merrill, Peter Little, Martin W. Ewing, and Beverly R. Grayson.

== Philanthropy ==
Fisk has been described as "the most active of all the [Natchez] aristocrats in community affairs, playing a prominent role in educational, philanthropic, and church activities until his death." Historian Clayton James picked him out as a rare figure in the town who was cognizant of the social implications of his wealth:

Needless to say, the workings of geographical, demographical, economic, political, and social factors in the rise and decline of towns may never be explained satisfactorily. But there seems to be more than a coincidental relationship between the unique concentration of nabobs at Natchez and the fact that the town was the only one of any size in the Mississippi Valley in 1800 that did not become a considerable population and trade center later. Of course, no way is known to prove conclusively the causal affinity, but the general accumulation of evidence surely points toward an indictment of the "swell-heads." Except for a rare individual like Fisk, the weight of aristocratic wealth and talent was never directed toward bettering the town's economic status. Although it may be merely idle but interesting conjecture, one cannot help but wonder how the community would have progressed if no nabobery had arisen or, on the other hand, if a concerted effort had been made by the aristocrats toward municipal development.

Fisk served as superintendent of the Natchez ecumenical Sunday school for a term that ended in or before 1829. Fisk was active in the Mississippi Colonization Society organized in 1831, one of several efforts to repatriate American enslaved people "back where they came from," by which the organizers meant Africa in the most general sense.

Fisk founded and funded the Natchez Institute, a secondary school for White children, and he had ambitions for a future Natchez college or university.

In 1840, he donated $200 in currency for the relief fund in the wake of the Great Tornado. In 1847 he was appointed president of the Irish famine (Irish: an Gorta Mór) relief committee of Natchez. In 1843, Fisk's brother Abijah Fisk left a bequest in his will for the establishment of a public library in New Orleans. In 1847, Fisk "purchased a substantial collection of books from bibliophile Benjamin Franklin French and placed them in the house on Customhouse Street with the intention of carrying out his brother's wishes," and in 1852 the collection was installed at the Mechanics' Society building. The collection was destroyed in a fire in 1854, and the Fisk Library bequest languished for decades. In 1896 the city government voted to "merge the Fisk Library and the City Library in order to create a free public library to be housed in St. Patrick's Hall on Lafayette Square," effectively beginning the public library in New Orleans.

== Personal life and death ==
Alvarez Fisk married a widow, Eliza Wilkins Major, at Woodford County, Kentucky, in 1819. His brother Stebbins Fisk died of tuberculosis in January 1837 in Massachusetts. His brother Abijah Fisk never married and left his estate to friends and Abijah's children, along with the library building bequest and a donation to the Lyceum. He died in 1845 at age 60. Alvarez Fisk died at Araby plantation in Madison Parish, Louisiana in 1853.

According to the authors of the Esplanade Ridge volume of the New Orleans architecture series published by the Friends of the Cabildo group, the Fisk family evacuated from New Orleans with permission from General Benjamin F. Butler and spent the duration of the American Civil War in Flat Rock, North Carolina. Their son Stuart Wilkins Fisk was killed in action during the civil war as the colonel of the 25th Louisiana Infantry Regiment. According to Advocates for Harvard ROTC, Fisk "received his AB and MA from Yale in 1840 before attending and graduating from Harvard Law School. In the spring of 1861, he was enrolled as captain in the 1st Louisiana infantry. While stationed in Florida, he wrote to Confederate President Jefferson Davis as a 'planting neighbor' and requested that his unit be sent to Virginia since his men were: 'Of the best Louisiana families, well educated, trained and read to fight'. His request was granted and took part in his 1st skirmish in July 1861. At the end of 1861, he wrote to the War Secretary (i.e. Judah Benjamin) for authority to recruit a regiment of 1,000+ men which he would personally pay to equip and feed. After spending over $20,000...by March 1862 and was commissioned as the colonel and commanding officer of his unit. [Fisk] was killed in action in Murfreesboro on 31 December 1862. His brigade commander reported: 'Among the killed I have to report and to regret the death of Col. S. W. Fisk, who fell gallantly leading his battalion in the charge. He was a worthy, brave and gallant officer'."

Two of Fisk's daughters also died during the war: "Isabel Fisk and her husband William Fogo died in January, 1864, in Columbia, South Carolina, leaving an infant son, Stuart Wilkins Fogo. Alice Fisk (Mrs. Robert Dow Urquhart) died in July, 1865, while the family was preparing to return to New Orleans at the end of the Civil War. Mrs. Fisk, her sister Martha, her bachelor son Edward, her son-in-law Robert Dow Urquhart, her four Urquhart grandchildren, and one Fogo grandchild returned to New Orleans in the fall of 1865 and reopened the house." Their son Edward A. Fisk died in 1883.

Alvarez Fisk's widow, Eliza Wilkins (Major) Fisk, died at her home at 84 Esplanade Street, New Orleans, in 1887, at age 88. Alvarez, Abijah, and Eliza are all buried in Natchez City Cemetery. Tulane University may hold a collection of Fisk family papers.

== Sources ==
- Christovich, Mary Louise; Evans, Sally Kittredge; Toledano, Roulhac (1977). New Orleans Architecture. Vol. V: The Esplanade Ridge (ebook ed.). Pelican Publishing Company. ISBN 978-1-4556-0936-9.
- Federal Writers' Project (1938). New Orleans City Guide. American Guide Series. Boston: Houghton Mifflin Co. – via Prelinger Library, Internet Archive.
- James, D. Clayton (1993) [1968]. Antebellum Natchez. Baton Rouge, Louisiana: Louisiana State University Press. ISBN 978-0-8071-1860-3. LCCN 68028496. OCLC 28281641.
- Pierce, Frederick Clifton (1896). Fiske and Fisk family: being the record of the descendants of Symond Fiske, lord of the manor of Stadhaugh, Suffolk County, England, from the time of Henry IV to date, including all the American members of the family. Chicago, Illinois: Press of W. B. Conkey Company.
- Sansing, David G.; Callon, Sim C.; Smith, Carolyn Vance (1995) [1992]. "Alvarez Fisk". Natchez: An Illustrated History (2nd ed.). Natchez, Miss.: Plantation Pub. Co. pp. 93–95. ISBN 978-0-9631823-1-9 – via Internet Archive.
