= Surget family =

Wealthy American slave owners

The Surget family of Natchez, Mississippi, United States were wealthy planters and major slave owners before the American Civil War. They were considered among the Natchez nabobs, a group "of about forty families whose men were prominent in agricultural, professional, and commercial vocations...One such clan included the closely related Surget, White, Wilkins, Bingaman, Lintot, Minor, Vousdan, and Chotard family, each of which held title to vast cotton domains." Possessed of one of the "most complicated and vast" baronies of the Cotton Kingdom, the Surgets were among the South's most expansive enslavers. Four male members of the family with the surname Surget held 1,800 enslaved people in 1860, but "but if one includes the entire network of families who intermarried with female members of the Surget family," the number of slaves owned by the Surgets "rises to a remarkable 5,287."

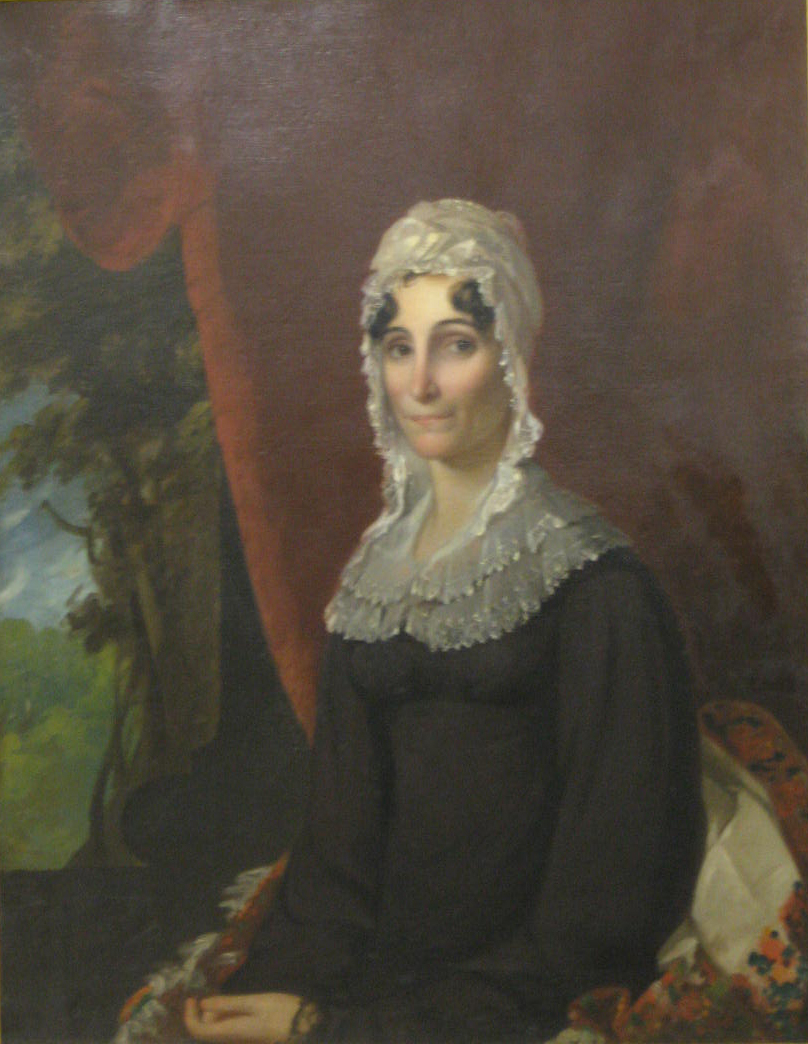
Catherine Charlotte Surget, fourth-born surviving child of Katrina Hubbard and Pierre Surget, married St. Catherine's Creek plantation owner Adam Bingaman

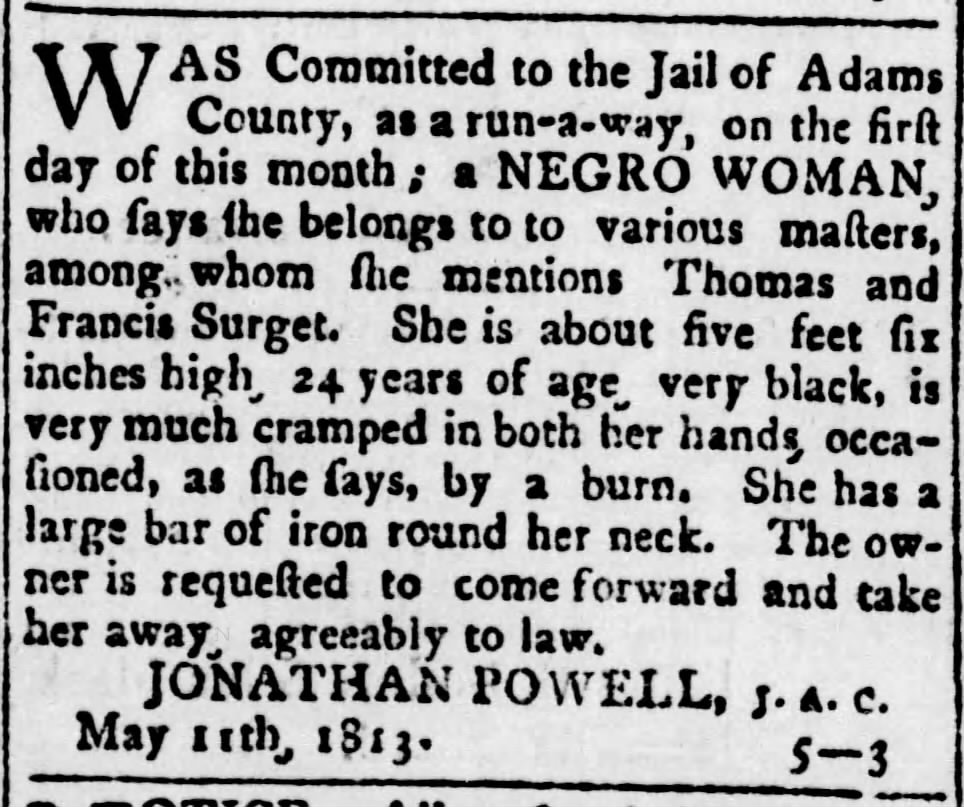
"...says the belongs to various masters, among whom the mentions Thomas and Francis Surget. She is about five feet six inches high, 24 years of age, very black, very much cramped in both her occasioned, as the says, by a burn. She has a large bar of iron round her neck..." (Natchez Gazette, May 25, 1813)

Economic historian Paul W. Gates characterized the antebellum Surgets as "rich, domineering, and arrogant...not well regarded by their less successful neighbors." Regional historian Clayton James suggested that the Surgets were among the leading culprits of local nabobery criticized by the newspapers for reaping immense profits from the plantation regime while paying scant taxes and without even making an occasional reputation-laundering bequest to church, library, or school.

The family was also known for its racehorses and were key members of the Mississippi Jockey Club that raced at Pharsalia Racetrack. Their insularity was also evident in this realm as "the less-privileged elements of their community were neither wanted nor needed to uphold civic pride...the Nabobs made few attempts to attract racing enthusiasts from other parts of the state or the region, as they were both willing and able to cover Pharsalia's costs among themselves rather than relying upon tourists for revenue or journalists for publicity...[and] they displayed little interest in the goings-on at other southern tracks, with the exception of those in and around New Orleans."

== Pierre Surget ==
The family was founded by Pierre Surget (1731–1796), a French sea captain who married Katrina Hubbard and had nine children with her and who settled in the Natchez District in 1785. Surget the founder was granted 2,500 acres by the Spanish crown in 1788 and there built his Cherry Grove plantation. The history of Pierre Surget is poorly documented, but a 1939 feature article in the New Orleans Times-Picayune, meant to market the Natchez Pilgrimage, told this tale:

The first American Surget, Pierre, was born at a substantial farmhouse in Normandy where his father intended him for the priesthood. But the active child rebelled at imprisonment and with another small boy ran away from the monastery. The two children paddled out in the harbor of La Rochelle and scrambled aboard an unknown vessel whose captain agreed to take them as cabin boys. Next lay, far off shore, the black flag was hoisted and the runaways realized they had sailed on a pirate ship. Possibly this is why the visitor at Natchez may sometimes hear a hushed whisper that old Pierre Surget laid the foundations of his fortune under the skull and crossbones.

A British frigate promptly overhauled them, put the crew in irons, and took both boys to England. Authorities believed their story and Pierre's companion willingly went home, but Surget stubbornness in little Pierre stuck by his guns and the boy became a sailor. Years afterwards we find him established at New York, with a wife and home, while carrying on a profitable trade in Chinese waters.

The family lived for a time at New Orleans, then Baton Rouge, until one day about 1785. Pierre's ship dropped anchor at Natchez. A love of farm life might still have lingered in his Norman blood, for Pierre went ashore and found acres to his liking seven miles south of town. His vessel carried a cargo of iron which Pierre bartered to the Indians...Anyhow Pierre Surget got Cherry Grove Plantation and to this day his descendants have never let go of it.

In 1800, the top three taxpayers in the Second Creek assessment district were Benjamin Farar, Anthony Hutchins, and "Mrs. Surget." At that time their respective taxable slaveholdings were 27 people, nine people, and six people. At the time of Katrina Hubbard Surget's death in 1805, she held title to 7,000 acres of land in the area.

== Jacob Surget ==
Jacob Surget (~1777–1869) moved to New York City but retained title to one plantation in Adams County, Mississippi. In 1868 he wrote to his nephew James Jr. about the people whom they had once enslaved, "You must not turn the old folks on the place off...Let them remain and take good care of them, as long as they behave themselves...It is a pity the blacks were not all driven out of the country."

== Frank Surget ==
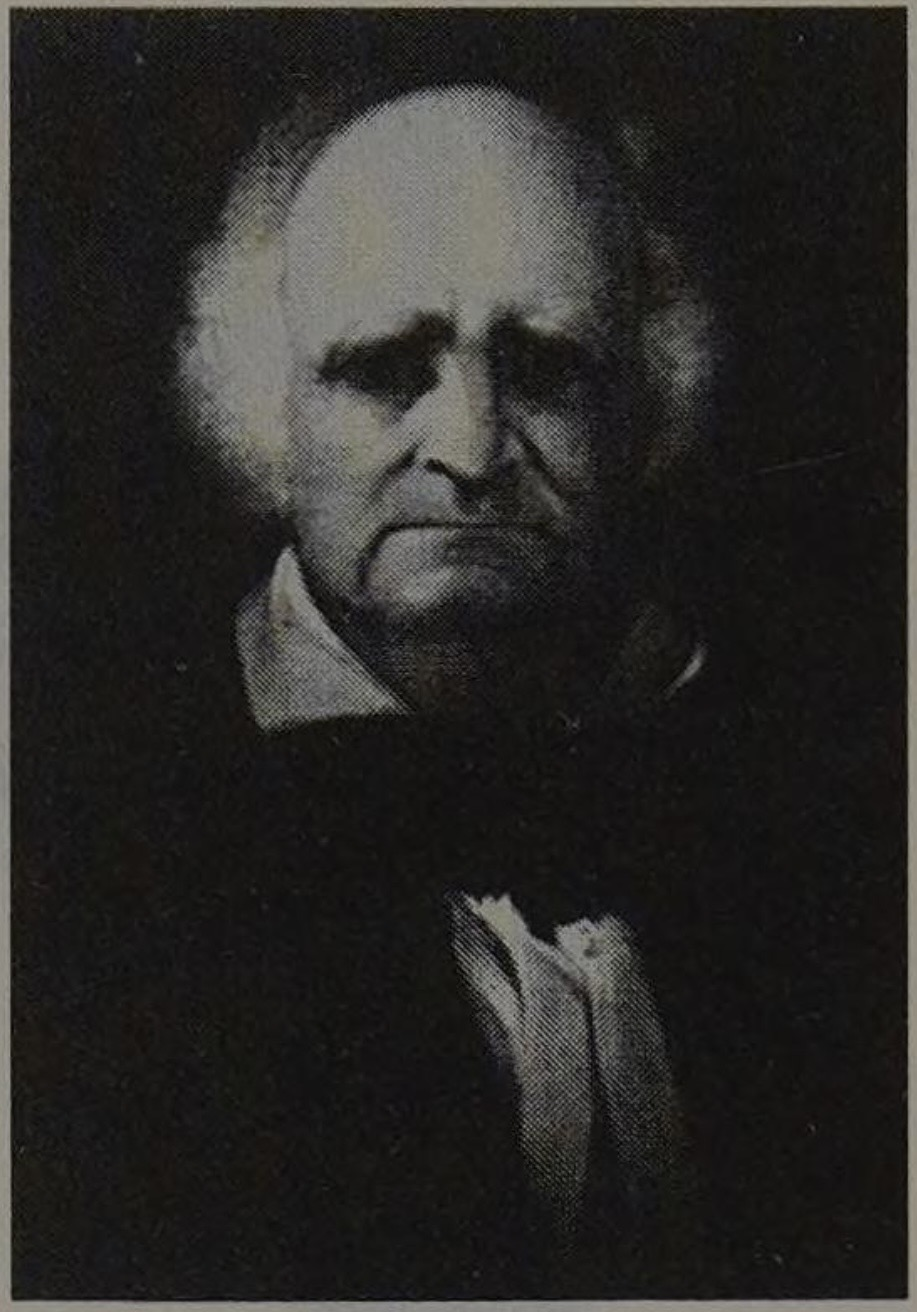
Francis Surget Sr. (~1783–1856)

Francis "Frank" Surget Sr. (~1783–1856) was the wealthiest Surget-surnamed heir of the second generation. He married Eliza Dunbar, a daughter of Sir William Dunbar. Historian J. F. H. Claiborne, himself from an elite clan of planter-politicians, described Francis Surget as "the most extensive and successful planter ever known in Mississippi." By the 1850s he was one of the richest of the rich in Natchez, at a level with Levin Marshall and Stephen Duncan. Frank Surget lived at Clifton house in Natchez, with 22 enslaved people who served him. Intermarriage kept the Surgets connected with other elites, creating an entanglement of credit and opportunity as "the two youngest daughters of Francis Surget Sr. married, respectively, Ayres P. Merrill II and Alfred Vidal Davis; one of his sisters married the first Adam Bingaman; one of his nieces married the son of William J. Minor, another wed Pennsylvania native Dr. Gustavus Calhoun, and yet another became the second wife of Stephen Duncan."

=== Life and work ===
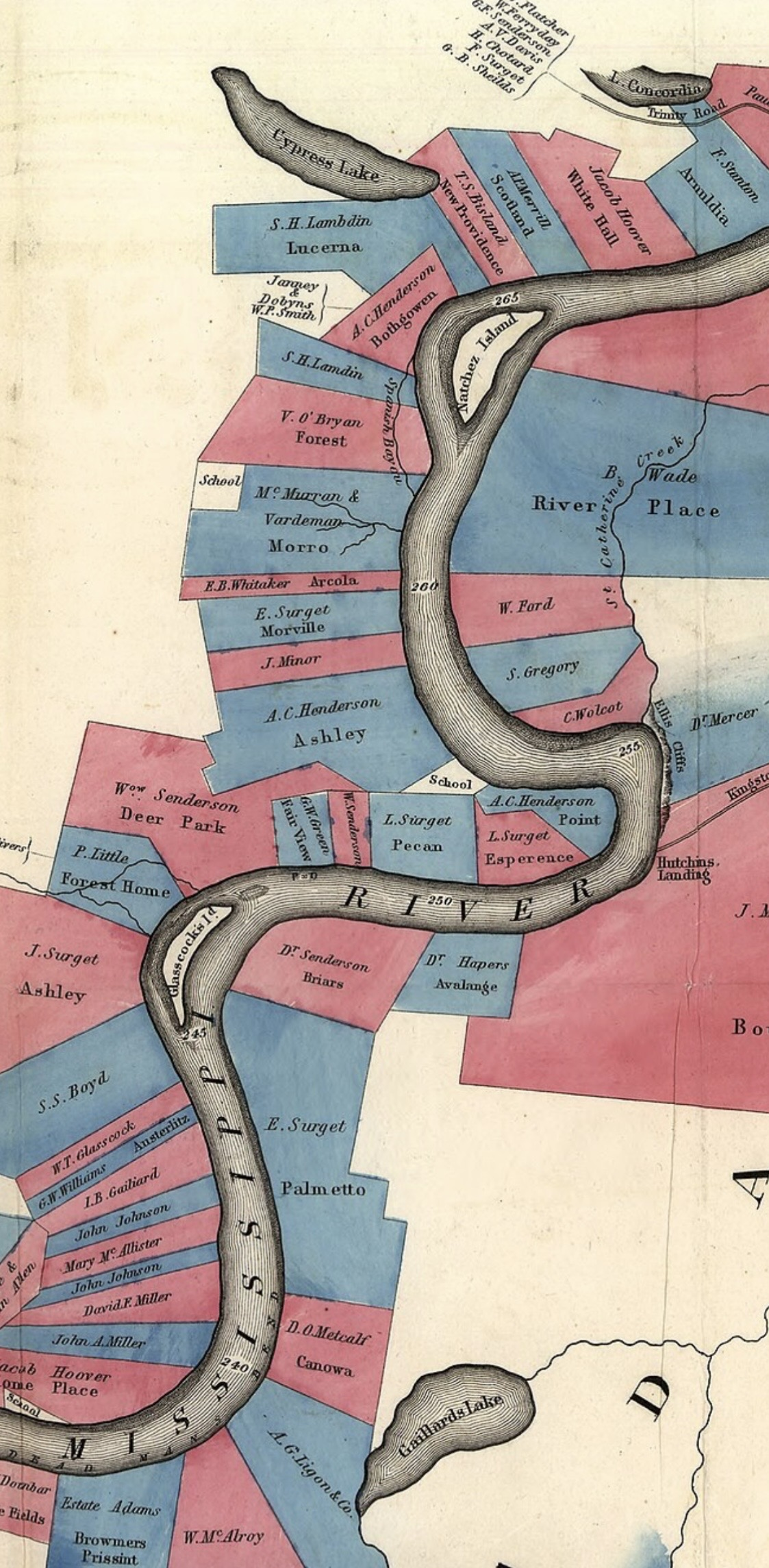
Some of the plantations owned by J. Surget, F. Surget, E. Surget, L. Surget, and A. F. Merrill, along the river in Concordia Parish and Adams County, as pictured on Norman's chart of 1858

When he was 25 years old, "according to recently organized Adams County court records...[Surget] was indicted by a grand jury in October 1808...for the alleged rape of spinster Mary Ellis at his plantation the previous July. Apparently the case never went to trial, for there is no further mention of it in the records." Four of Surget's children died in autumn 1826, possibly due to an epidemic disease like yellow fever or cholera. In 1838, Washington Jackson listed him as a reference for a new cotton brokerage with branches in Liverpool and Philadelphia.

Frank Surget owned tens of thousands of acres in Adams and Wilkinson counties, Mississippi; Concordia and Madison parishes, Louisiana; and in Arkansas. In 1855 an Arkansas newspaper criticized Frank Surget Sr. for holding 11,000 acres of prime cotton land near Batesville for nearly 20 years without having developed it or offered it for sale to another planter. Surget minimized the massive erosion that plagued other riverfront planters by at least plowing horizontally on contour.

=== Francis Surget Jr., Lenox Surget & Eustace Surget ===
Son Francis Surget Jr. married Charlotte Linton and inherited Clifton, which by the time of the 1860s civil war was "a lofty brick structure with Ionic columns and broad galleries. The furnishings of teakwood, mahogany, and rosewood, together with large mirrors, expensive portraits, marble busts, satin damasks, and specially designed china, were a perfect complement to the exterior of the home." Francis Surget Jr. celebrated Christmas in 1860 with gifts of silver coins to slaves he held in bondage. Frank Surget Jr. was a Unionist during the American Civil War.

Frank Surget's son Lenox Surget dropped out of Yale University his freshman year but still found work as a plantation owner. In March 1858 a Cincinnati court ruled that the owners of an Ohio River steamboat must compensate L. Surget $1,400, plus interest, for the value of a slave who escaped by finding employment on the steamboat and thereby transport to a free state. Lenox Surget died in Natchez at age 31 in May 1858.

Youngest son Eustace Surget was a lieutenant colonel and assistant adjutant on Dick Taylor's staff in the Confederate States Army, and after the war moved to Bordeaux, France. He hung onto a Concordia Parish plantation that he leased out on an annual basis.

=== Clifton house ===
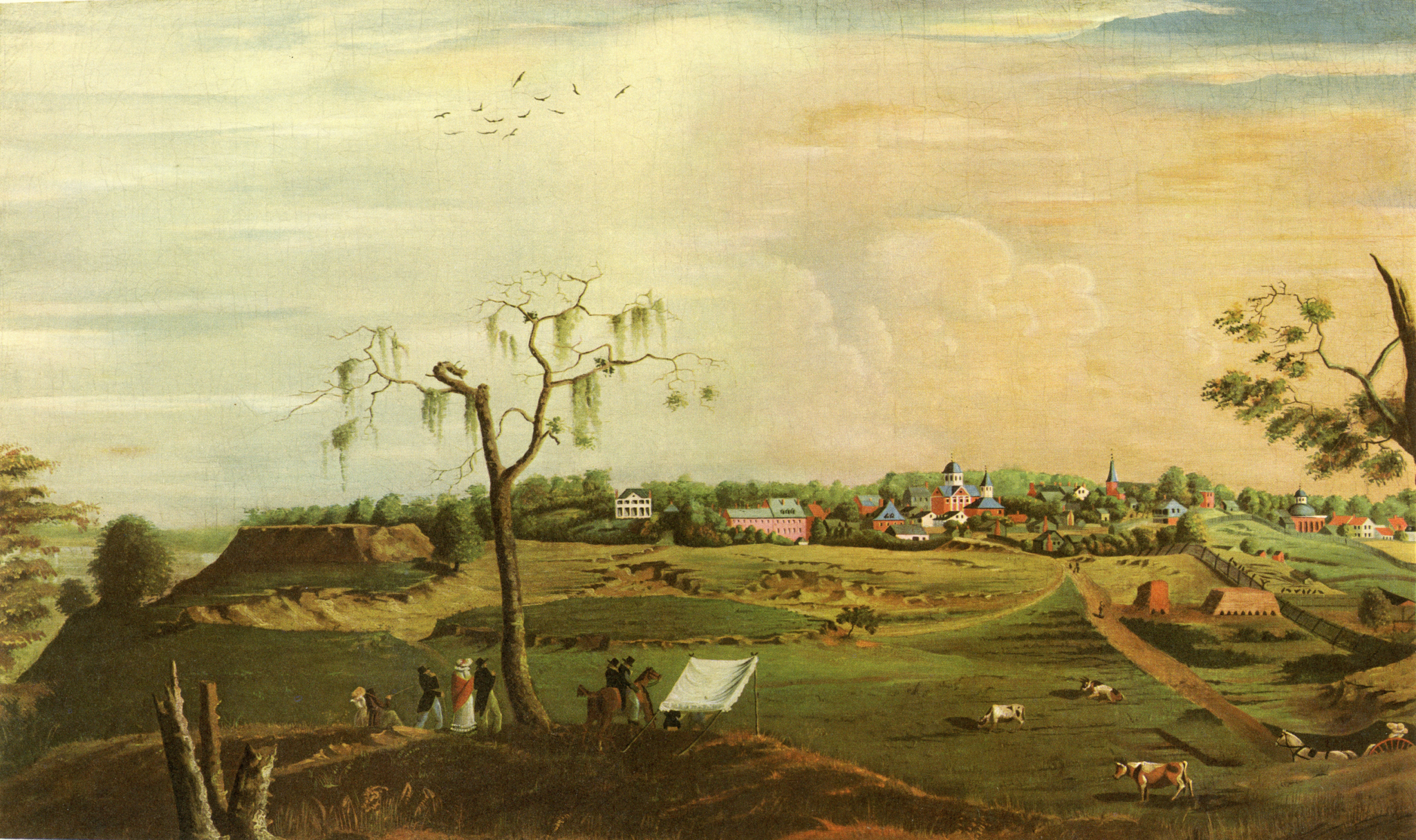
A local woman commissioned this 1823 view of Natchez from John James Audubon but died before she could pay the bill and take possession; Clifton is the white grid-looking building off in the distance below the tree in the foreground

Clifton house was commissioned by Natchez banker-merchant Samuel Postlethwaite II in about 1820. Postlethwaite died of yellow fever in 1825, and his heirs sold Clifton to the Surgets. The only known surviving image of Clifton appears in View of Natchez, an 1823 painting by John James Audubon.

Clifton was dynamited by a surly artillerist during the American Civil War, but in the meanwhile, U.S. Army colonel (shortly thereafter promoted to brigadier general) Thomas Kilby Smith "bivouacked" there in July 1863. With no particular assignment but to "represent General Grant" to the locals, Col. Smith wrote home an expansive description of Clifton (letter now in possession of the Huntington Library in California):

"The home of Mr. F. Surget where I have been quartered for the past week is one of the largest & most elegantly appointed mansions in all the South, any description that I can give of its superb appointments will be but feeble. The proprietor counts his plantations by the dozens, his slaves by the thousand, those people I mean who were his slaves. He has traveled most extensively all over Europe. His summers for almost his lifetime have been passed in Europe or at our Northern watering places. His family consists only of himself & wife, a lady of some thirty five years, not beautiful, but thorough bred, tall figure, fine eyes, good refined features, a gentle musical voice & a sweet smile. He fifty. The mansion is very large. Great rooms with high ceilings, long wide halls, ample piazzas, windows to the floor & opening upon grassy terrace. Walls hung with chefs d'oeuvres of Europe's and America's best artists. Busts from Powers & Crawford, paintings from Landseer, & Sully & Peal. Everything that can minister to refined taste almost is here.

For the grounds we must imagine a chain of very high & steep bluffs bordering a wide river winding its silvery sheen far above and below, so serpentine is its course that miles & miles away, far off toward the setting sun, you can see its waters glittering in the last rays. While intervening there is a plain & forest, plantations highly cultivated dotted with their white washed Negro quarters—and the dank green swamp land, disappearing amid waving moss-grown trees, to reappear tortuously ribboned amid cane break & plain, always in these calm days a mirror of the bright blue skies & the fleecy clouds robing themselves ever in new & ever changing forms of beauty, of flowers & bowing trees, gracefully bending their salutations of welcome. As you approach upon the broad carriage way that gracefully sweeps past the high columned portico, shaded by Cypres & magnolia & crape myrtle gorgeous in its bloom & blooming always, your feet crackling over the gravel & sea shells, now almost lost in labarynthine ways, over terraces & undulating sward, over rustic bridges, through cool & verdurous valleys of gloria mundi, Japan Plums, the live & water oak, literally a flowery pathway of exotics, exotics of georgeous coloring and startling magnificence, almost indigenous to the soil in which they grow. The river view bursts suddenly upon you, & in the beautiful summer house you sit down entranced, wondering if it is all real, of if the scene has not been suddenly composed by an enchanter's wand. Flowers & blooms & fruit are all around, & almost sick with perfume. One can dream away the hours in ectasy of enjoyment, the air so soft & balmy, all so still so peaceful apparently. One must here awhile forget the lurking serpent.

You return to the house by the orchards & cultivated land by the Greenhouse, hot house & pineries, a house that cost a small fortune has been built to shelter a single banana tree that grows within its hot atmosphere bears fruit & puts forth its great green leaves three feet or more in length. Numbers of plants are clambering about the conservatories, the more ordinary beauties of the green house and of the parterre smile in boundless profusion & perfection of bloom. Pines & figs of three or four varieties, Melons I should be afraid to tell you how large for you would not credit me. Cantelupes, peaches, pears & the most delicious nectarines are brought fresh to the table every day. Shooting galleries & billiard rooms elegantly fitted up for the ladies as well as gentlemen are placed in picturesque positions in the grounds & gardens. Stables & office all con-cealed, nothing to offend the most fastidious taste. One continuously wonders that such a Paradise can be made on Earth."

=== Goat Castle murder ===
Jennie Merrill, the victim in the 1932 "Goat Castle murder," was a granddaughter of Frank Surget and the daughter of Jane Surget and Ayres Merrill II.

== James Surget ==
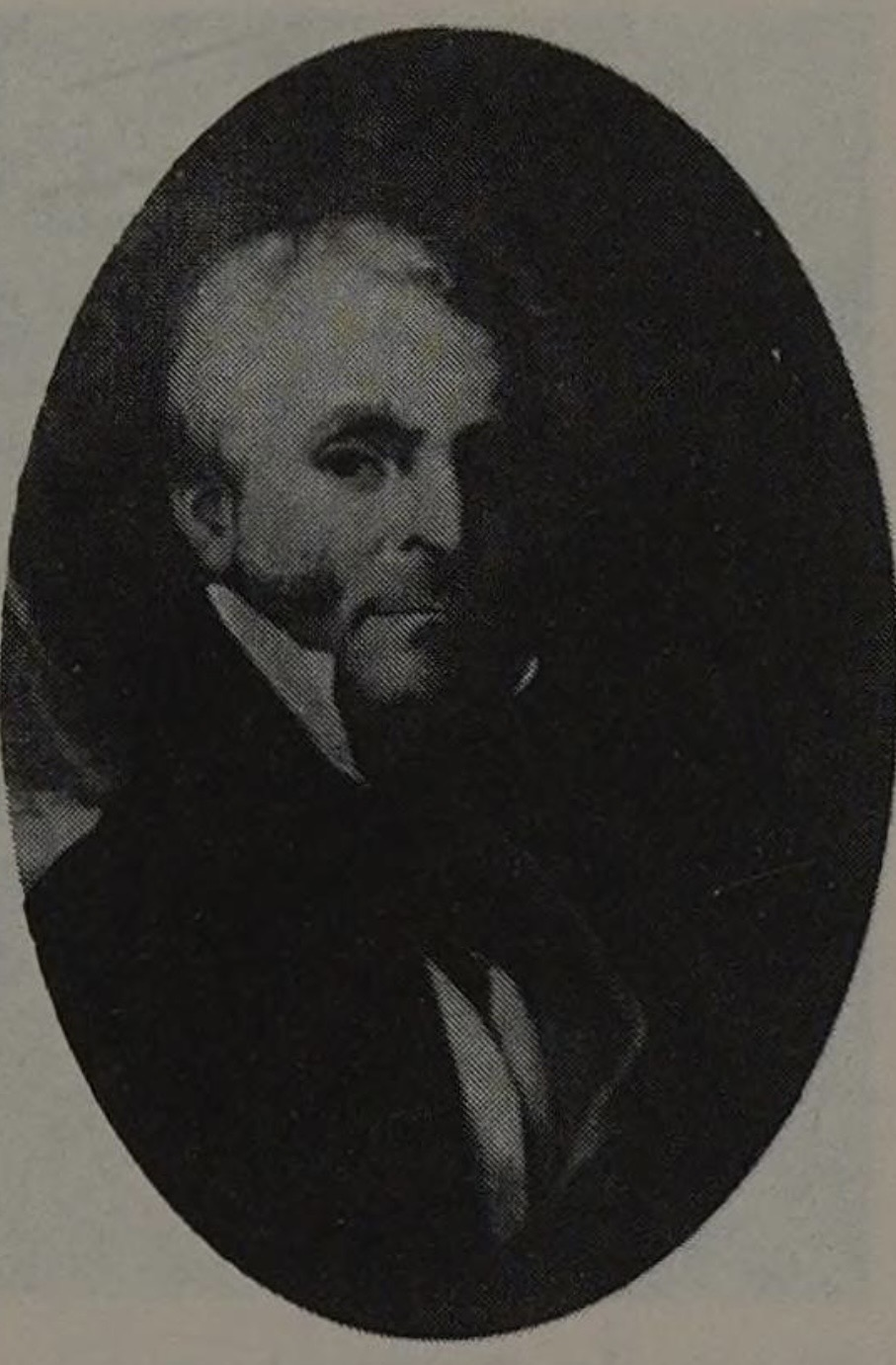
James Surget (1785–1855)

James Surget (1785–1855) married Katherine Lintot and had three children. According to one account, he participated in the Battle of New Orleans. He owned nine plantations in Louisana and Mississippi, and enslaved somewhere between 500 and 1000 people. His farms produced at least 4,000 bales of cotton annually making him one of the top cotton planters in the U.S. South. James Surget lived at Cherry Grove, which he inherited from his parents, with 16 enslaved house servants as of 1850.

James Surget Jr. supposedly sold $600,000 in cotton in 1866, which may have been his crop of 1862, hidden somewhere during the war. James Surget's son James Surget Jr. married Catherine C. Boyd, daughter of attorney, planter, and large-scale enslaver Samuel S. Boyd, in 1873. They lived at Gloucester.

Frank Surget Jr. died in 1866 but had he lived he might have been annoyed that his cousin married Boyd's daughter. When Boyd was readmitted to the Union in 1865, "Past allegiances were quickly forgotten. 'Shields, Boyd, Metcalfs [sic] &c nearly all the other fire-eaters have taken [the oath],' sniped the Unionist Frank Surget in June. 'In fact as is always the case the most rabid come forward first'." There were 400 guests at the wedding, and Surget's gift to his bride was a diamond parure.

== Jane Surget White ==
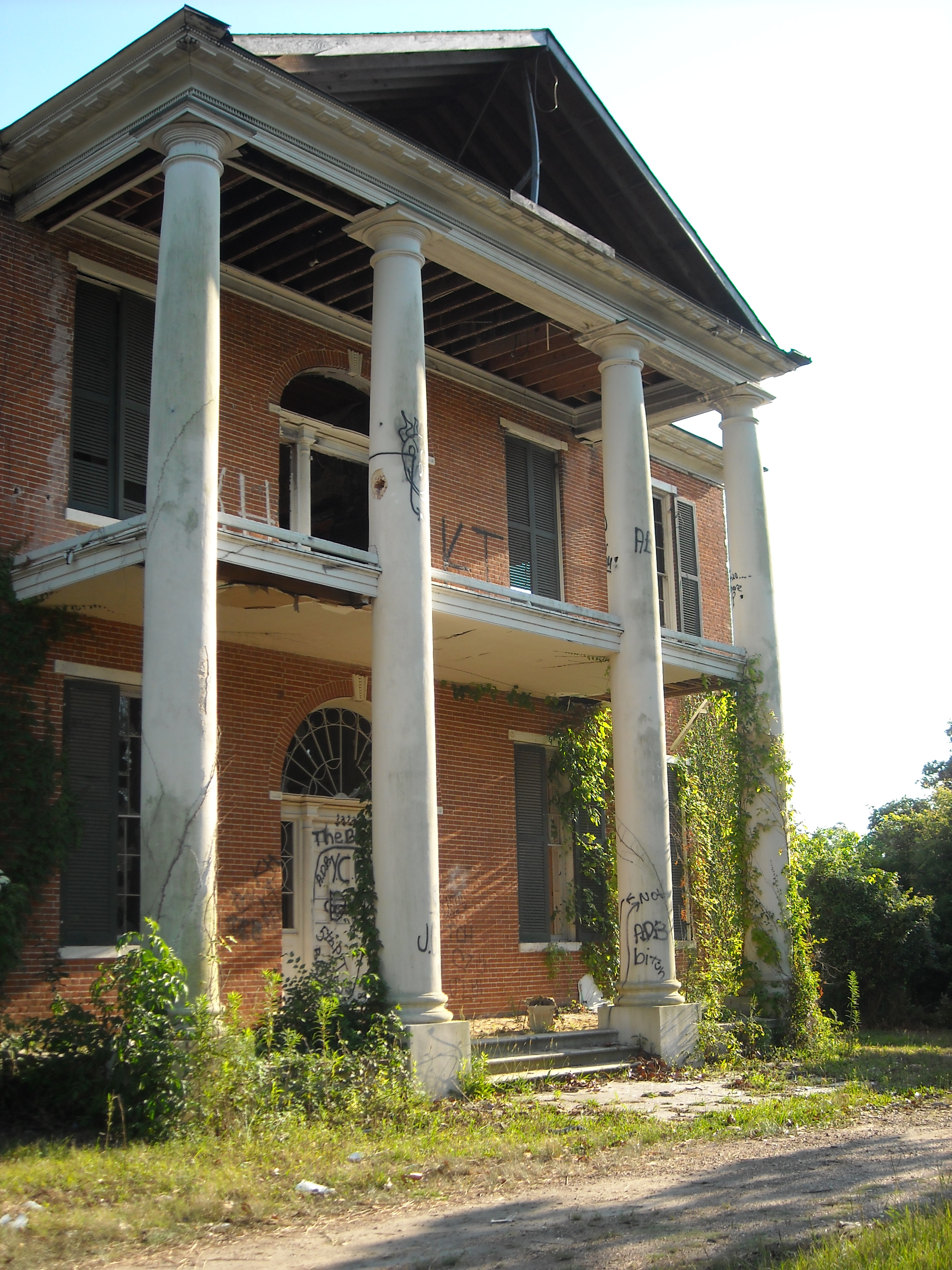
Ruins of Arlington (2009)

Jane Surget (1787–1825), daughter of Pierre, married John Hampton White. The couple is often credited with the construction of Arlington house, for instance in Harnett T. Kane's 1947 Natchez on the Mississippi. (Kane contributed a ghost!Jane to the story to give the narrative some additional flair.) This attribution is largely due to fabulism on the part of local booster, Natchez Garden Club member, and untrained aspiring local historian Edith Wyatt Moore, who contributed to the New Deal's Historic American Buildings Survey and "in this HABS set, like the one for Linden, Edith Moore produced erroneous information, partly based on what Annie Barnum told her and partly based on her imagination...Moore stated that 'according to authentic papers kept by the Natchez chapter of the D.A.R., Arlington was designed by noted Elizabethtown, New Jersey, architect John Hampton White, who was a cousin of the noted late nineteenth century architect, Stanford White'. She claimed that John Hampton White came to Natchez during the Spanish regime; in 1808, he married Jane Surget and spent the next eleven years building Arlington, but died before it was completed. Jane, as a widow, spent the next five years completing the home and then planned a lavish housewarming party on June 30, 1825. But the morning after the party, Jane was found murdered...Perhaps unsurprisingly, this is all completely untrue."

Per a series of later researchers, deed records show that lawyer and land speculator Jonathan Thompson built the Federal-style Arlington circa 1820, around an earlier, more rustic structure that was owned and constructed by Lewis Evans, but "due to many inaccuracies such as those regarding Arlington, architectural historians for the rest of the 20th century were correcting Edith Moore's false reports." Once brocade-and-Aubusson textile ritzy, and shelter for an 8,000-volume library of books, Arlington is now derelict.

== William Surget ==
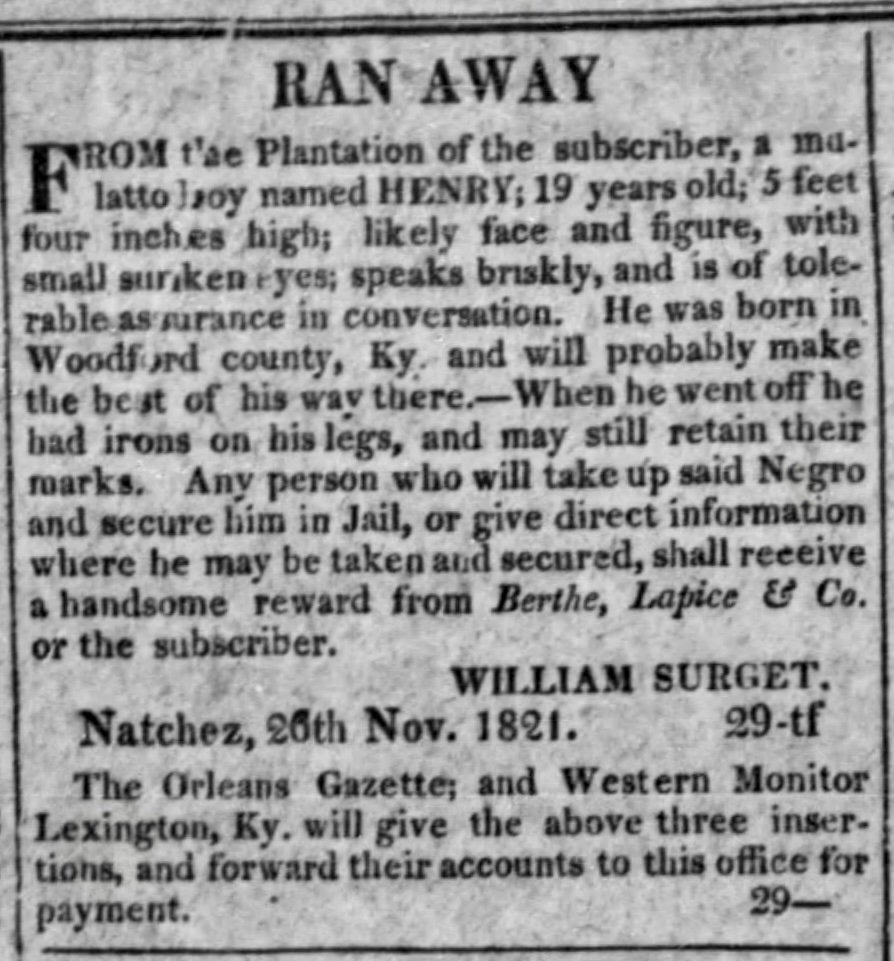
The firm of James Berthe, Laurent Millaudon, and Pierre Lapice would pay the reward for Henry if he was found ("Ran Away" Mississippi Free Trader, January 9, 1822)

William Surget (1795–1834) was prosecuted by Mississippi Territory in 1816 for assaulting "his slaves 'with whips, sticks, knives and clubs...in a barbarous and unusual manner' not equal to their crimes." A jury fined him $358. When Surget died in 1834, his estate "yielded proceeds of about US$80,000 (equivalent to $2,580,000 in 2025), a modest amount compared to the estates of his brothers."

== See also ==
- Clifton Heights Historic District
- William St. John Elliot
- Alvarez Fisk
- Benjamin Farar Jr.
- Routh family

== Sources ==
- Gates, Paul W. (2017) [1960]. The Farmer's Age: Agriculture, 1815–60 (Original publisher: Holt, Rinehart and Winston). Economic history of the United States (ebook ed.). Routledge. doi:10.4324/9781315496658. ISBN 978-1-315-49665-8. Archived from the original on 2018-06-03.
- James, D. Clayton (1993) [1968]. Antebellum Natchez. Baton Rouge: Louisiana State University Press. ISBN 978-0-8071-1860-3. LCCN 68028496. OCLC 28281641.
- Kapp, Paul Hardin (2022). Heritage and Hoop Skirts: How Natchez Created the Old South. Jackson: University Press of Mississippi. ISBN 978-1-4968-3879-7. LCCN 2022014500. OCLC 1311168633.
- Sansing, David G.; Callon, Sim C.; Smith, Carolyn Vance (1995). "The Surgets". Natchez: An Illustrated History (2nd ed.). Natchez, Mississippi: Plantation Publishing Company. pp. 106–108. ISBN 978-0-9631823-1-9. OCLC 48539098. OL 26201155W.
- Scarborough, William Kauffman (2012) [2003]. Masters of the Big House: Elite Slaveholders of the Mid-Nineteenth-Century South. Baton Rouge: Louisiana State University Press. ISBN 9780807156001. LCCN 2003007301. OCLC 846496079. Project MUSE book 23668.
- Wayne, Michael (1983). The Reshaping of Plantation Society: The Natchez District, 1860–1880. Baton Rouge: Louisiana State University Press. ISBN 978-0-8071-1050-8. LCCN 82007817. OCLC 1151152977. OL 4448588W.
- Welch, Kimberly Mae (2012). People at Law: Subordinate Southerners, Popular Governance, and Local Legal Culture in Antebellum Mississippi and Louisiana (Ph.D. History). College Park, Maryland: University of Maryland.
- Zacek, Natalie (2024). Thoroughbred Nation: Making America at the Racetrack, 1791–1900. Baton Rouge: Louisiana State University Press. ISBN 978-0-8071-8323-6. LCCN 2024010878. OCLC 1432582612. Project MUSE book 124505.
