= Southdown Plantation =

Historic house in Louisiana, United States

- U.S. National Register of Historic Places
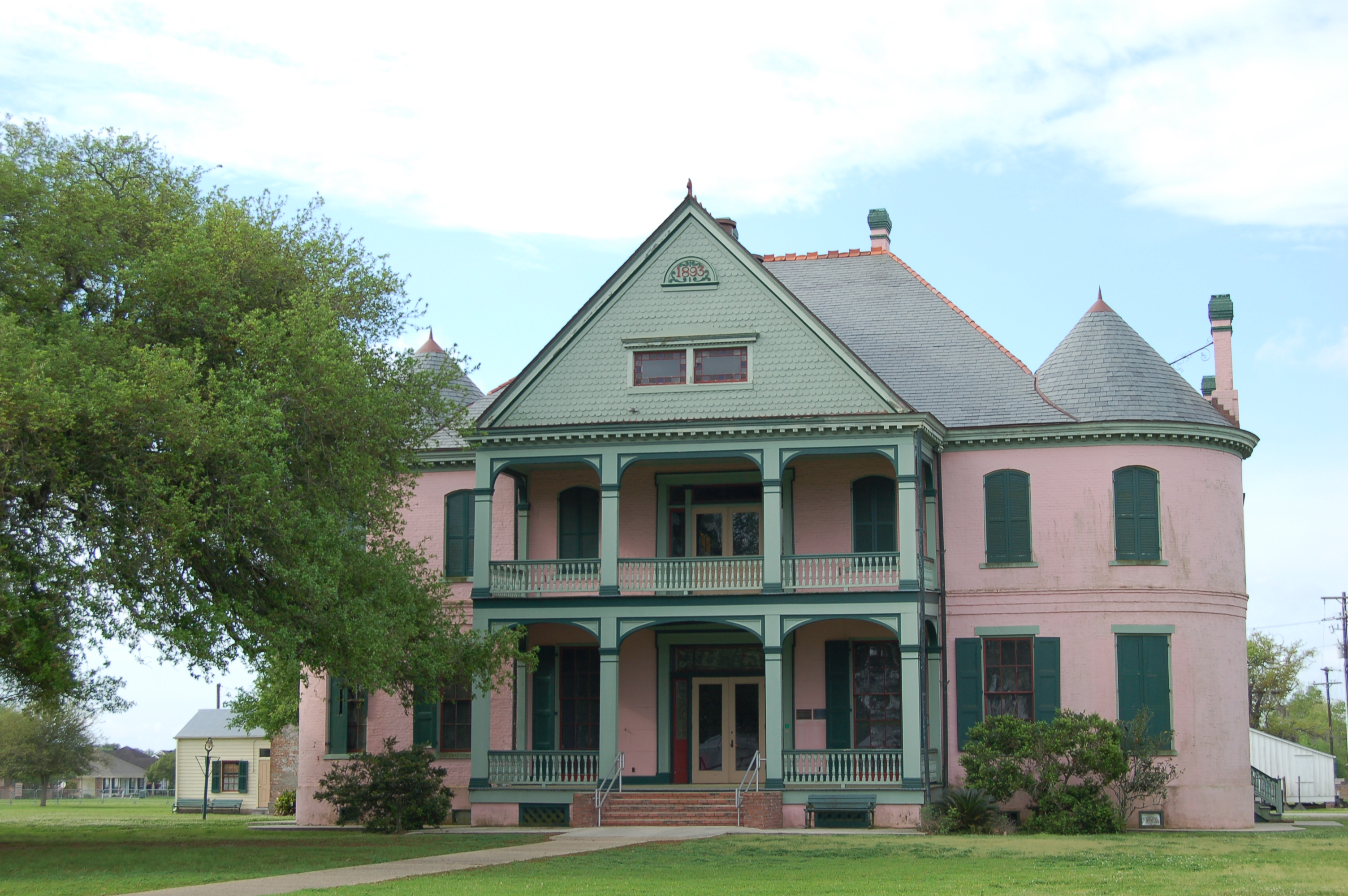
- The restored plantation house as it appears today.

- Location within Louisiana Location within the United States
- Location: Terrebonne Parish, Louisiana
- Coordinates: 29°35′19.5″N 90°44′25″W
- Area: less than one acre
- Built: 1858
- NRHP reference No.: 74002188
- Added to NRHP: January 18, 1974

Southdown Plantation is a historic Southern plantation in Terrebonne Parish, Louisiana.

== Founding and early history ==
Southdown Plantation was founded in 1828 by William John Minor, son of Stephen "Don Esteban" Minor, former secretary to the Spanish Governor of Louisiana, Manuel Gayoso de Lemos and James Dinsmore. The land had first been a Spanish land grant and was later owned by brothers Jim and Rezin Bowie, who began planting and harvesting indigo there. Minor purchased the land, approximately 1,020 acres, together with James Dinsmore. In 1831, sugarcane became the principal crop, and the first sugar mill was built in 1830-31. Dinsmore sold his half of the plantation to Van Winder in 1842 & Winder was bought out by William John Minor. By 1852, Southdown was home to 233 slaves, most of whom lived in family units on the property.

The second plantation house was built by Mr. Minor in 1858, and was named for a breed of sheep that the family raised. The house was built of hand-fired brick and wood from local cypress and pine trees.

The original one-story brick home was expanded in 1893, after William's death by his son, Henry Chotard Minor, when a second story and Virginia-style colonnaded walkways were added. In the same year, Favrile glass panels depicting the plantation, palmetto leaves, magnolia branches, and sugar cane stalks were installed in the house. The plantation consisted of over 10,000 acres of sugar cane fields, a sugar mill, and a race track. Through Southdown Plantation, the Minors were instrumental in introducing and sustaining the sugar industry in the area, and ensuring the survival of the crop by developing a variety of sugar cane that was resistant to mosaic disease.

The Minor family was known for entertaining guests and hosting multiple balls and receptions.

== Modern era ==
During the Great Depression in the 1930s, the Minor family lost ownership of the house. It was acquired by Realty Operators, which later renamed itself Southdown Sugar Inc. In 1979, the Southdown sugar mill was closed. Its parts were shipped to and reassembled in Guatemala, where it continued operation. It was the last of the 86 sugar mills that had operated in Terrebonne Parish during the sugar boom of the 19th century.

In 1974, the plantation was added to the National Register of Historic Places. The following year, the owner Southdown Land, a subsidiary of Southdown Sugar, donated the property to the Terrebonne Historical and Cultural Society. While the plantation house was being renovated, the original 1893 pink and green paint scheme of the exterior walls was discovered and restored. On June 27, 1982, the plantation house and slave quarters were opened to the public as a museum.
