= Shadyside (Natchez, Mississippi) =

Historic house in Mississippi, United States

- U.S. National Register of Historic Places
- Location within Mississippi
- Location: 107 Shadyside St., Natchez, Mississippi
- Coordinates: 31°33′49″N 91°23′27″W
- Area: 1 acre (0.40 ha)
- Built: 1850
- Architect: Hardie, James
- Architectural style: Greek Revival
- NRHP reference No.: 79001301
- Added to NRHP: March 29, 1979

Shadyside is a historic house in Natchez, Mississippi, U.S.

== History ==
The house was built on land from the Concord Plantation. Ralph North, a Jefferson College alumnus, judge and slaveholder, purchased 14 acres in 1849 and built the house in 1850. It was designed in the Greek Revival architectural style probably by James Hardie (architect). Two years after the end of the American Civil War in 1867, it was acquired by Osborne K. Field. It was purchased by Thomas Junkin in 1890. In 1971, it was acquired by Thomas McNeely.

The house has been listed on the National Register of Historic Places since March 29, 1979.
