= James Hardie (architect) =

American architect

James Hardie (died 1889) was an American architect of Natchez, Mississippi. Several of his works are listed on the U.S. National Register of Historic Places.

Hardie was an immigrant from Scotland. He and two brothers, all carpenters, moved to Natchez in the 1830s.

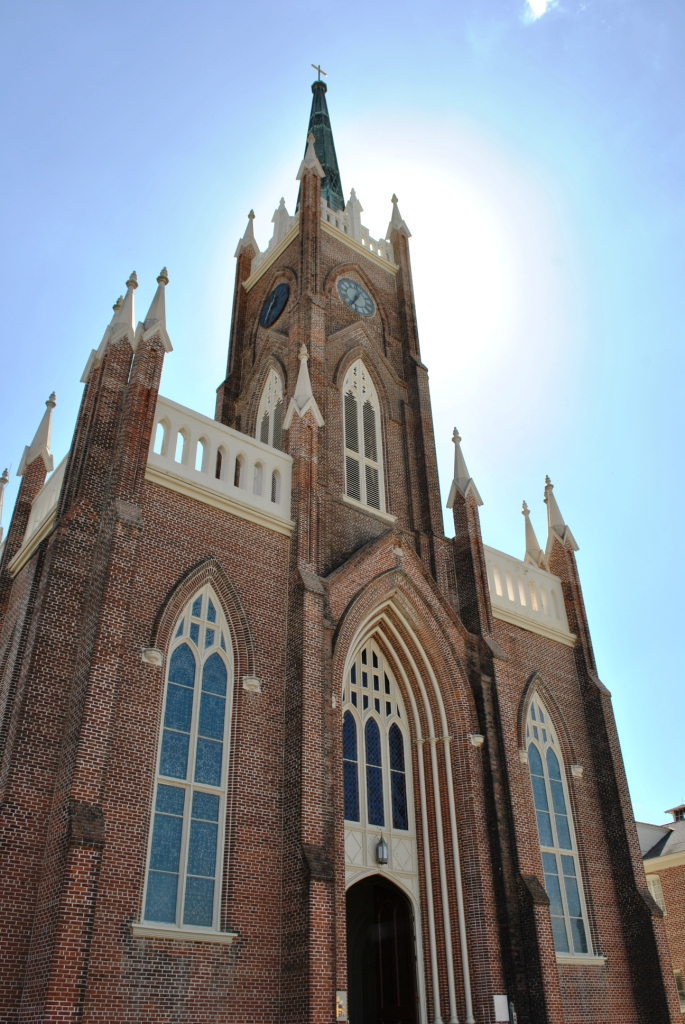
St. Mary's Cathedral, Natchez

He designed St. Mary's Cathedral, in Natchez, which is listed on the National Register within the Natchez On-Top-of-the-Hill Historic District. The Gothic Revival brick cathedral's construction began in 1842 and it was dedicated in 1843.

Works include:

- Choctaw (1836), also known as Neibert-Fisk House, 310 N. Wall St., Natchez, a Greek Revival house NRHP-listed
- Chapel at Laurel Hill Plantation, S of Natchez off US 61, Natchez, Mississippi. The chapel was the first Gothic Revival building in Mississippi. Hardie also did repairs/renovations at Laurel Hill, in his old age. Laurel Hill is NRHP-listed
- Homewood (1852)
- Shadyside, 107 Shadyside St., Natchez, Mississippi, NRHP-listed
