= Washington Jackson =

Merchant banker (1784–1865)

Washington Jackson (21 January 1784–14 July 1865) was a merchant, banker, and cotton factor of the United States and United Kingdom. He emigrated with several siblings from Ballybay, Ireland, to Philadelphia and then Nashville, Tennessee. The Jackson brothers were familiar with Andrew Jackson from Nashville, and lent him money to fund the return trip of the Natchez Expedition. His brother James Jackson became an important planter and politician in Alabama. Washington Jackson served as cotton factor and creditor for a number of important Natchez nabob slave-owning planters in Mississippi and Louisiana. Washington Jackson had offices in New Orleans, Philadelphia, and Liverpool. He eventually relocated to the UK but retained his American investments. He is believed to have died and been buried in London.

== Biography ==
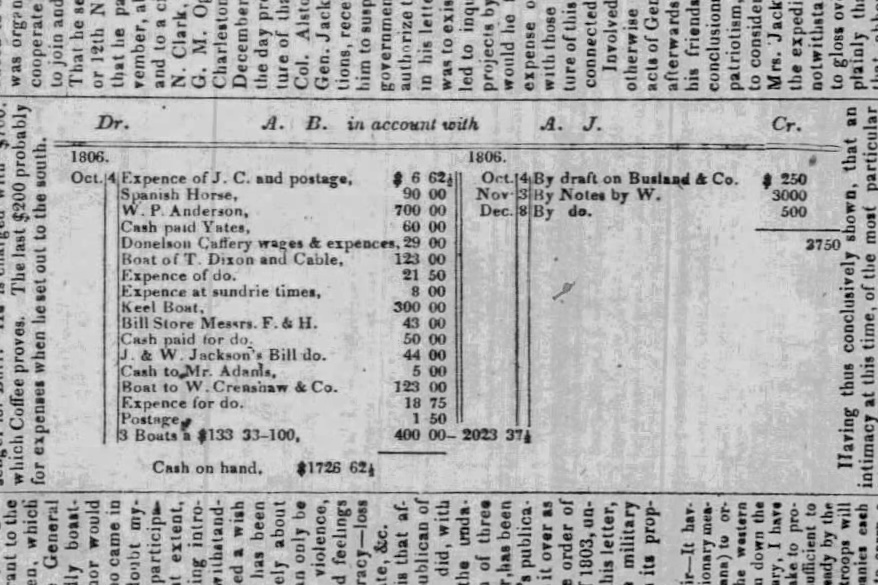
During the 1828 presidential election, opponents of Andrew Jackson published a document said to have been found in the papers of Harman Blennerhassett, showing "Aaron Burr in account with Andrew Jackson" during the Burr conspiracy of 1805–1807; W. P. Anderson was Jackson's aide-de-camp, Donelson Caffery was his Louisiana-based nephew, and W. & J. Jackson were Washington Jackson and James Jackson, merchants of Nashville and Natchez

When the brothers lived in Nashville, Tennessee, James and Washington had a "large dry-goods store on the square." In a list of expenses accrued by Aaron Burr in account with Andrew Jackson at the time of the 1806 Burr expedition, one of the line items was $44 paid to "W. & J. Jackson bill do." After Andrew Jackson killed Charles Dickinson in a duel in 1806, W. Jackson wrote him, "It's now well known to the World you are a man of true courage and honor...but such are the sentiments of my heart I must regret the loss of your antagonist [and] could have wished his Wound had not been fatal."

G. M. Deaderick, W. M. Tait, Washington Jackson, John P. Smith, George Poyzer, William Eastin, Alexander Porter, Senator Jos. Park, and William Wright met in 1808 at Talbot's Tavern to organize the Bank of Nashville, of which they were to be the directors. The bank sold shares of stock in 1814 at the office of Hynes & Fletcher, and James Jackson was agent, and Luke Lea cashier.

Washington Jackson moved to Natchez, Mississippi, and in 1809 had a store in Natchez, where he had an extensive inventory, including a "first rate new keel boat, 25 tons burden, with poles and oars" advertised for sale in September, and where he sold a slave woman prone to "fits" to a "free French" woman of color on behalf of Andrew Jackson in December. Once settled in Mississippi he became a cotton factor and developed business relationships with planter-barons including Stephen Duncan and Dr. William Mercer. As of 1811, Washington Jackson had a partner named Riddle in Philadelphia. In 1814 with assessed taxes of $92.32 on "sales of US$34,462 (equivalent to $529,238 in 2025) of merchandize," he was one of the top taxpayers in Natchez, just behind Stephen Minor, estate of William Dunbar, Benjamin Farar Jr., and Adam Bingaman.

"Prime New Orleans Sugars" National Gazette and Literary Register, Philadelphia, November 29, 1824

In the 1820s he ran "major" trading firm in New Orleans called Washington Jackson & Co. The firm shipped sugar and other products out of the Attakapas district of Louisiana. By 1821 he was "in the commission business with a Philadelphia partner". In March 1827, Washington Jackson bought a large tract of land, in the Irish Bend region of Bayou Teche near Franklin in St. Mary Parish, Louisiana, from Thomas Martin of Tennessee. Martin's agents, the brothers Joshua Baker and Isaac L. Baker, had sold the same land to their neighbor and brother-in-law Alexander Porter in February 1827, resulting in the case Jackson & als. v. Porter (8 Mart. (n.s.) 200, Louisiana 1829) before the Louisiana Supreme Court.

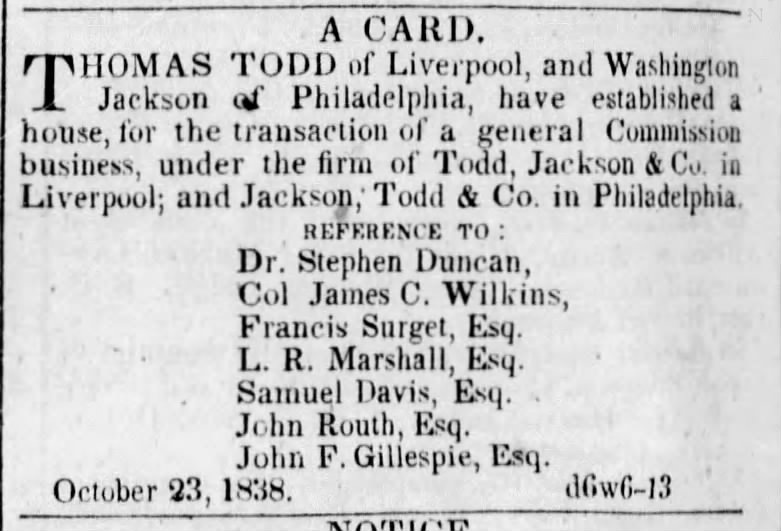
References for Jackson, Todd & Co. included Dr. Stephen Duncan, Col. James C. Wilkins, Francis Surget, L. R. Marshall, Samuel Davis, John Routh, and John F. Gillespie (The Semi-Weekly Mississippi Free Trader, October 25, 1838)

W. Jackson moved to Philadelphia, and from there he moved to England. Nonetheless, he returned to the lower Mississippi River valley annually through the 1830s and 1840s to renew his relationships. His firm name in Philadelphia was Jackson, Riddle & Co. and then Jackson, Todd & Co. His firm with J. S. Riddle declared bankruptcy in the wake of the Panic of 1837. Thomas Todd ran the Liverpool office.

Jackson, Todd & Co. of Philadelphia closed in 1841. Washington Jackson remained active based on loans extended on the basis of relationships with planters including "Duncan, Surget, Chotard, Marshall, and others". As of 1855 one of his clients was Alabama and Louisiana cotton and sugar plantation owner Meredith Calhoun. New Orleans millionaire Mercer left "his favorite watch" to Jackson in his will. At one time Jackson was in business with his sons Norman Jackson and Washington Jackson Jr. His wife and daughters were presented to Queen Victoria by Mrs. Dallas in 1860. His sons "carried on a successful mercantile business" in England into the 1880s.

== Sources ==
- Agee, Phil (September 2022). Debt-Driven Settlerism: Small Farmers and Bankers in the Trans-Appalachian South, 1800–1820 (Thesis). City University of New York (CUNY) Graduate Center.
- Farrell, W. E. (2007). "Andrew Jackson 7th President of the United States and the Jacksons of Ballybay 1803–1824". Clogher Record. 19 (2/3): 202–238. doi:10.2307/27699566. JSTOR 27699566.
- Jackson, Andrew (1984). Moser, Harold; Macpherson, Sharon (eds.). The Papers of Andrew Jackson, Volume II, 1804–1813. University of Tennessee Press. doi:10.7290/utp3038. ISBN 978-0-87049-441-3.
- Rothstein, Morton (1979). "The Changing Social Networks and Investment Behavior of a Slaveholding Elite in the Ante Bellum South: Some Natchez Nabobs, 1800–1860". In Greenfield, Sidney M.; Strickon, Arnold; Aubey, Robert T. (eds.). Entrepreneurs in Cultural Context. School of American Research, Advanced Seminar Series. Albuquerque: University of New Mexico Press. pp. 65–88. ISBN 978-0-8263-0504-6. LCCN 78021433. OCLC 4859059.
