= Cherry Grove Plantation =

Historic house in Mississippi, United States

- U.S. National Register of Historic Places
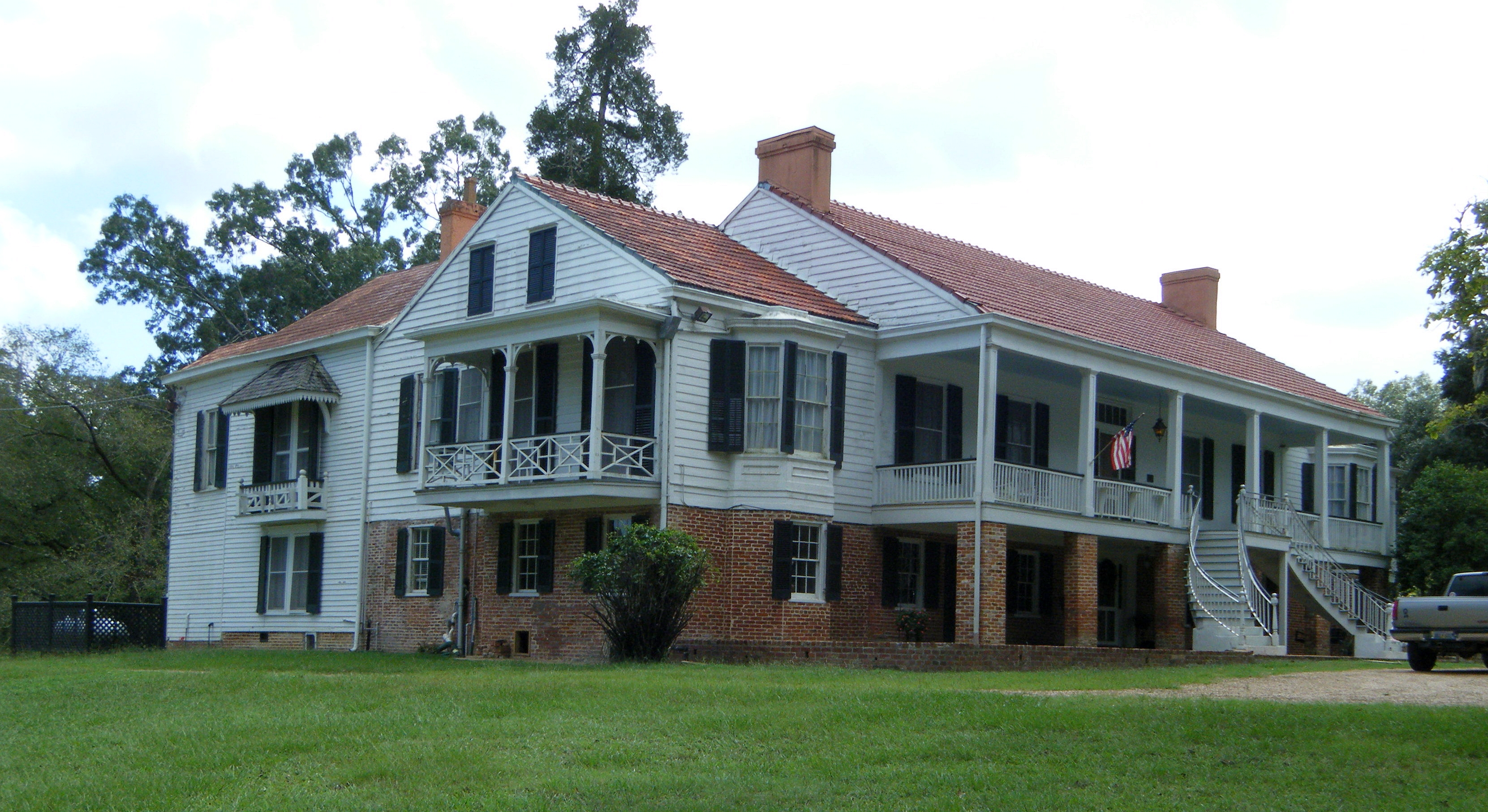
- Cherry Grove Plantation in 2009

- Location within Mississippi Location within the United States
- Location: Natchez, Mississippi
- Coordinates: 31°27′51.5″N 91°21′13.3″W
- Area: 150 acres (61 ha)
- Built: 1865
- NRHP reference No.: 83000949
- Added to NRHP: March 31, 1983

Cherry Grove Plantation is a historic plantation in Natchez, Mississippi.

== Location ==
It is located in southeast Natchez, Mississippi, in Adams County, on Second Creek.

== History ==
The mansion was built by Pierre Surget (1731-1796), a French planter, in 1788, over 2,500 acres of an English land grant, granted to him by the Spanish government. As such, it is one of the earliest private residences in Natchez. After his death, his widow Catharine (Hubbard) Surget expanded the grounds of the property. By 1850, the house belonged to their son James Pierre Surget, with sixteen house servants in residence. Cherry Grove has been in the continuous ownership of the same family since 1788 and has remained always a working plantation. It remains in the family of Surget descendants.

Cherry Grove Plantation is today one of the best preserved and most complete plantation complexes in the Natchez area. The original plantation residence constructed by Pierre Surget and his wife Catharine burned in the mid-nineteenth century, and the present picturesque and architecturally significant residence was constructed about 1865 by Pierre Surget's grandson James Surget, Jr. The form of the house, which consists of a residence constructed upon a fully raised basement with a central five-bay block and flanking single-bay wings, has the regionally early single-pile plan with rear "cabinet" rooms enclosing each end of a rear gallery recessed under the rear slope of the roof. Likewise, the facade of the central block features a gallery that is recessed under the front slope of the roof. These features suggest the possibility that the present house may have taken its basic form from the earlier house which burned. The original flanking wings with octagonal bays and gable-end balconies represent the concession of the builder to the popular taste of the 1860s. The collection of plantation outbuildings is exceptional and includes an unusual tenpin frame alley building with attached late-nineteenth century gymnasium, smoke house, detached kitchen building, corn crib, stables, privy, sheep stalls, and barns. Hand-hewn cypress troughs for feeding and watering the stock are rare plantation survivals, and the plantation cemetery containing the graves of Pierre and Catharine Surget and their descendants is located within sight of the main dwelling house. The plantation gains added significance from its long history of family ownership. Pierre Surget, originally a seaman by trade, was the patriarch of the Surget family in Natchez, a family that formed one of the largest planting dynasties in the entire South. Pierre's son Frank was described by one contemporary historian as the most extensive landholder and successful planter in Mississippi.

In addition to their plantations in Mississippi, Pierre Surget's sons owned vast tracts of farm land in Louisiana and Arkansas as well. After the death of Pierre Surget, Cherry Grove was efficiently managed by his wife Catherine and eventually became the property of their son James. From James Surget, Cherry Grove passed to James Surget, Jr., who was responsible for the construction of the present residence and was considered by many to have been the best thoroughbred horse breeder in the state of Mississippi. Cherry Grove is owned today by descendants of the granddaughter of James Surget, Jr., Mrs. Douglas MacNeil, philanthropist and former national president of the Girl Scouts of the USA.

In September 1861, a group of planters rounded up slaves after hearing rumors they schemed to “kill their masters”, and “ravish”, “ride” and “take the ladies for wives”. Ten were hanged in Brighton Woods and Cherry Grove.

It has been listed on the National Register of Historic Places since March 31, 1983.

== Filming location ==
- 1982 – Rascals & Robbers: The Secret Adventures of Tom Sawyer and Huck Finn – CBS TV movie starring Anthony Michael Hall, Patrick Creadon, Ed Begley Jr., Lydy Henley Caldwell, and Cynthia Nixon
- 1974 – Autobiography of Miss Jane Pittman

== Architecture ==
Cherry Grove is a one-and-a-half story frame residence set upon a fully raised brick basement. A five-bay central block with gable roof and inside-end brick chimneys at each gable end is flanked by symmetrical recessed wings. Each of the flanking wings features an octagonal bay whose windows are set over molded panels and a gable-end cantilevered balcony with the entablature of the balcony roof supported by bracketed, chamfered posts linked by a railing composed of diagonal boards forming Xs, whose point of intersection is enframed by boards forming rectangles. The northwesterly facade of the five-bay central block is fronted by a gallery recessed under the front slope of the roof, and access from ground level to the gallery is provided by a pair of graceful, elliptical stairways with turned newels and rectangular- sectioned balusters that terminate in a central landing. The gallery roof fs supported by tapered, paneled, and molded box columns that are echoed on the front wall of the house by pilasters. The columns are linked by a railing of rectangular-sectioned balusters with molded handrail. The sheltered facade is finished in horizontal matched boards with molded base, and the door and window openings feature a molded architrave surround. All window openings of the house are filled with six-over-six, double-hung sash and are closed by shutter blinds, almost all of which are original. The entrance doorway consists of a single-leaf door with four fielded panels that is set beneath a hinged transom and flanked by hinged sidelights that extend to the floor. The interior of the house features a single-pile plan with two rooms on each side of a central hallway. A rear gallery, which is supported by chamfered posts linked by a railing of rectangular-sectioned balusters, is located beneath the rear slope of the roof and is enclosed at each end-by a "cabinet" room. The interior millwork is identical throughout and consists of symmetrically mol8ed door and window surrounds with corner blocks, four-paneled doors, and bases, that are molded with two fascias. The mantel pieces in the westerly two rooms feature cast-iron mantel pieces with arched openings and car- touches. The mantel pieces in the easterly two rooms are wooden and pilastered. Access to the unfinished upper half story and to the basement is provided in the recessed rear gallery by a stairway that runs along the rear wall of the house. The upper stair runs in a westerly direction in a single straight flight with the stair to the basement running below in an easterly direction. This gallery stairway features rectangular-sectioned balusters and a chamfered newel post. The basement story rooms are more plainly trimmed with batten doors, unmolded door and window surrounds, and simply beaded bases. The wooden mantel pieces vary and are either pilastered or have molded architraves.

In the 1880s, a two-story frame addition was added to the rear of the easterly end of the house. This addition is fronted by a double-tiered gallery on the westerly elevation that forms an L with the rear gallery of the main house. The interior of this wing has symmetrically molded door and window surrounds with corner blocks, and the mantel pieces are typical compositions of the 1880s period. A complete complement of outbuildings surrounds the main plantation house. The kitchen building, which was constructed in the late nineteenth century, is a one-story, single-bay building constructed of rock-faced cement blocks and topped by a pyramidal roof. The hall is a one-story, five-bay, gabled roof residential building with a recessed gallery and board-and-batten siding. The hall was constructed in the 1870s or 1880s. The smoke house is a one-story, single-bay brick building with hipped roof and brick vents. The privy is a diminutive, single-bay, frame structure with gabled roof. The corn crib and stable buildings both exhibit unusual gable on hip roofs. The tenpin alley is a narrow, one-story frame building with gable roof to which has been added a tall, one-story, single-bay building with gabled roof and board-and-batten siding. This tall addition was added to the tenpin alley in the late nineteenth century and was used by the children of the family as a gymnasium. Two, small, gabled-roof frame structures served originally as a hen house and a rabbit hutch. Two barns, both dating from the nineteenth century, and a gabled-roof sheep barn with pigeon loft complete the outbuildings. A plantation cemetery is located northwesterly and in sight of the main house.
