= Neibert-Fisk House =

Historic house in Mississippi, United States

- U.S. National Register of Historic Places
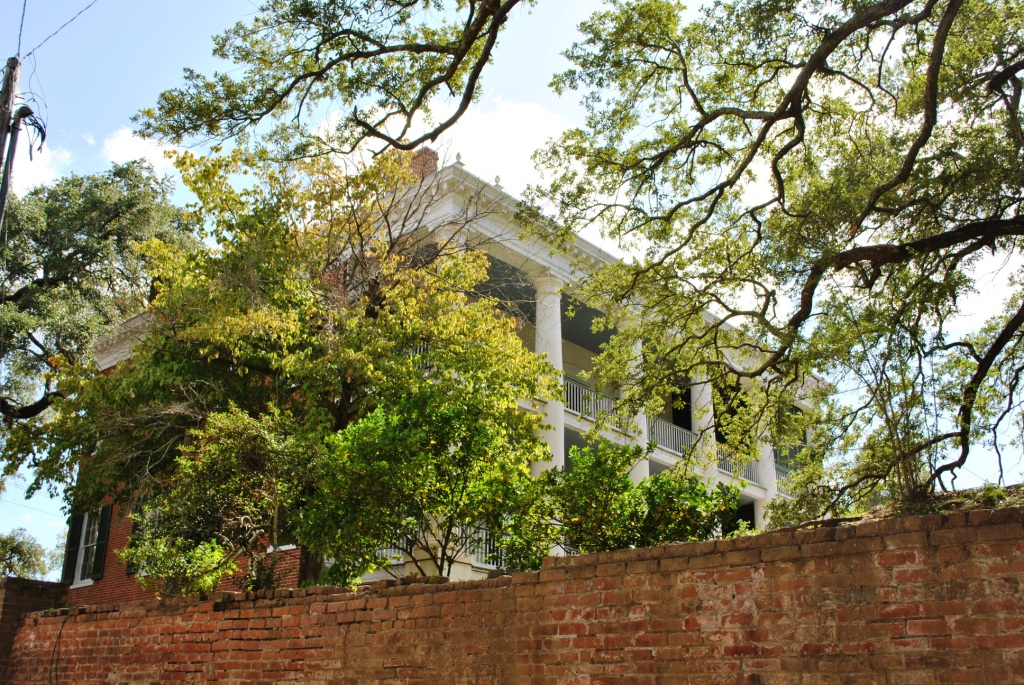

- Location within Mississippi Location within the United States
- Location: 310 N. Wall St., Natchez, Mississippi
- Coordinates: 31°33′48″N 91°24′7″W
- Area: 1.2 acres (0.49 ha)
- Built: 1836
- Architect: James Hardie
- Architectural style: Classical Revival
- NRHP reference No.: 79001295
- Added to NRHP: January 22, 1979

The Neibert-Fisk House, also known as Choctaw, is a historic mansion built in 1836 and located within the Natchez On-Top-of-the-Hill Historic District in Natchez, Mississippi, USA. It has been listed on the National Register of Historic Places for architecture since January 22, 1979; and is listed as a pivotal building within the Natchez On-Top-of-the-Hill Historic District.

== History ==
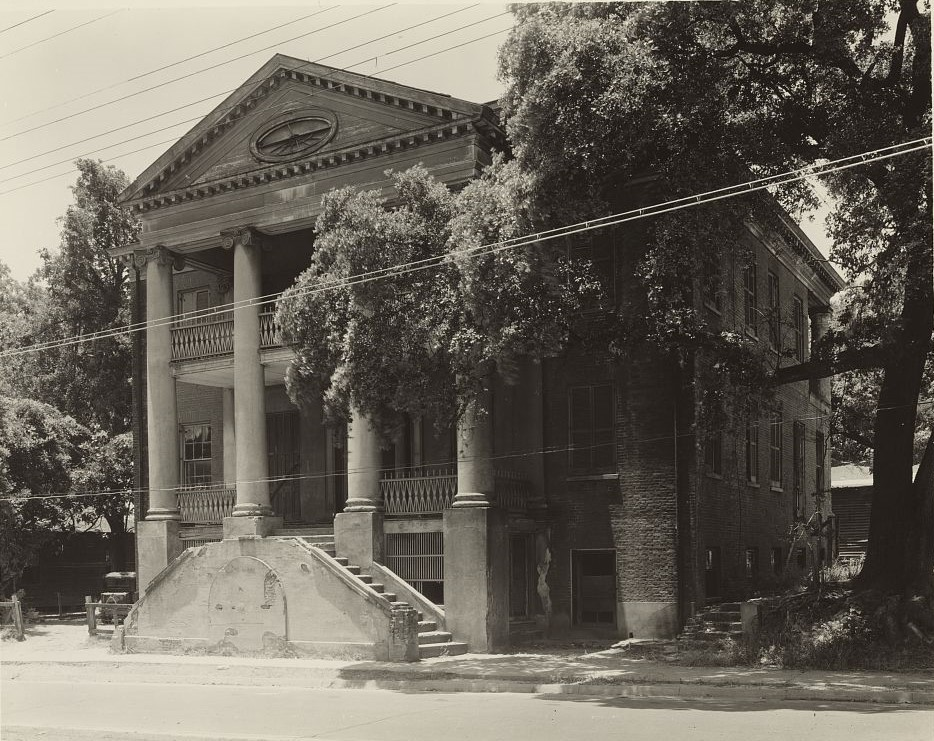
Choctaw, by Frances Benjamin Johnston, 1938

The land belonged to Sir William Dunbar in the early 19th century. In 1826, it was inherited by one of his sons, Archibald Dunbar.

The mansion was built for Joseph Neibert, a real estate speculator, in 1836. Neibert was an early settler originally from Washington County, Maryland. It was designed in the Greek Revival architectural style. It is believed to have been designed and built by carpenter James Hardie, but Neibert may have further added to the design.

It was purchased by Alvarez Fisk, a merchant and philanthropist, in 1844. Fisk was active in the Mississippi Colonization Society, which relocated free black people to Africa prior to the American Civil War of 1861–1865. After Fisk's death, the house was donated for the formation of the Natchez Institute in 1854, the first public school which was segregated.

By 1855, the mansion was purchased by George Malin Davis, an attorney. From 1915 to 1919, it was home to Stanton College, a women's college. By 1937, it was purchased by the City of Natchez, and restored. A fire damaged the first floor in 1978, but it was subsequently restored again.
