= William J. Minor =

American enslaver and banker (1808–1869)

- Born: January 27, 1808; Natchez, Mississippi
- Died: September 18, 1869 (aged 61); Southdown Plantation, Terrebonne Parish, Louisiana
- Resting place: Natchez, Mississippi
- Education: University of Pennsylvania (did not graduate)
- Occupations: Planter, banker
- Title: Captain
- Political party: Whig Party
- Spouse: Rebecca Ann (Gustine) Minor
- Children: 8
- Parent(s): Stephen Minor; Katherine (Lintot) Minor

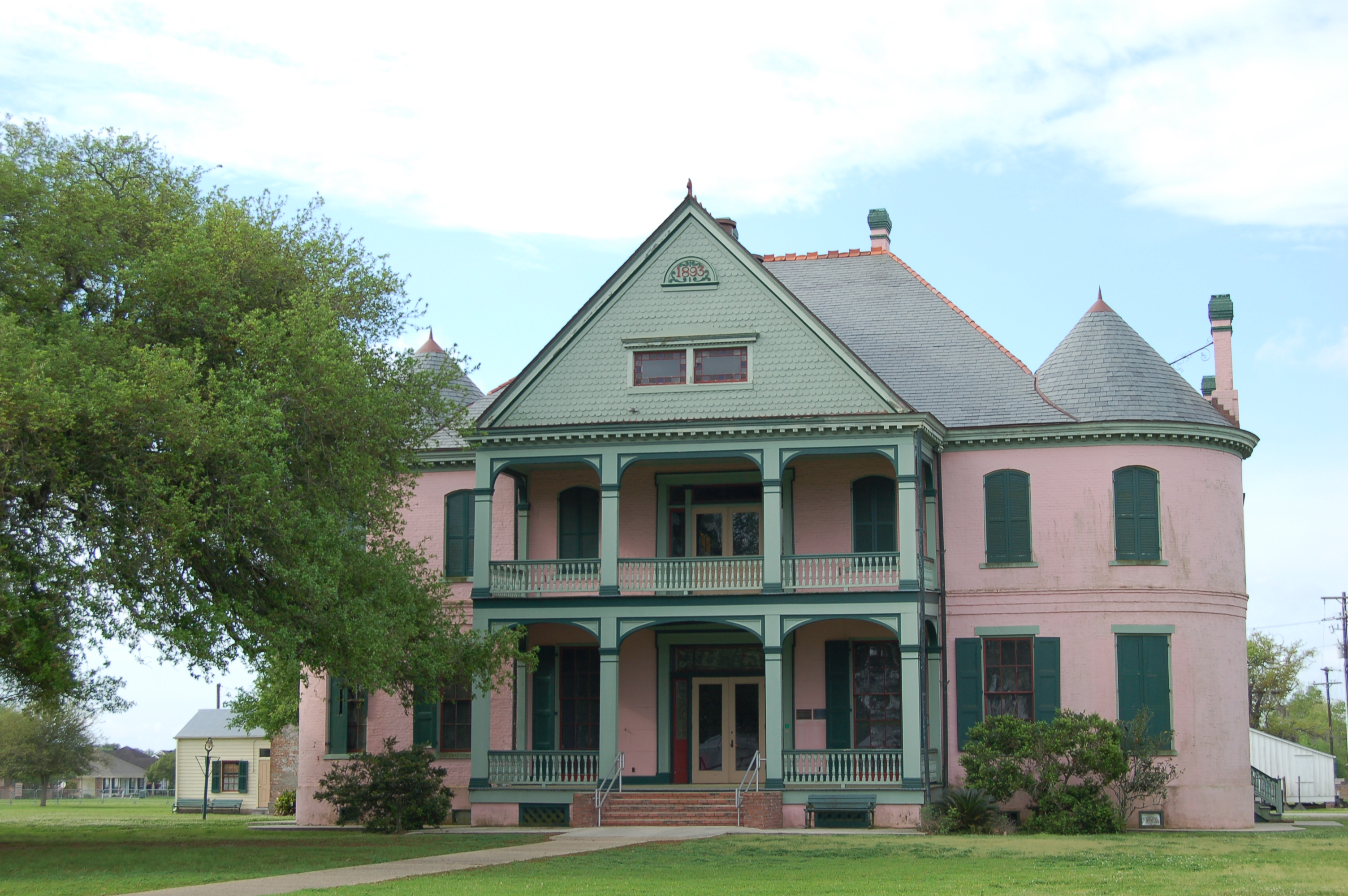
The Southdown Plantation, owned by William J. Minor.

Captain William J. Minor (January 27, 1808 – September 18, 1869) was an American planter, enslaver, and banker in the antebellum Southern United States. Educated in Philadelphia, he lived at the Concord plantation in Natchez, Mississippi, and served as the second President of the Agricultural Bank. He was the owner of three large sugar plantations in Louisiana and supported the Union during the Civil War for the stability of the sugar trade.

== Early life ==
Minor was born on January 27, 1808, in Natchez, Mississippi. His father was Stephen Minor (1760–1844), a planter and banker, and his mother, Katherine (Lintot) Minor (1770–1844).

Minor was educated in Philadelphia in the 1820s. He learned Latin, French, and English with a private tutor. He also "attended lectures in chemistry and philosophy at the University of Pennsylvania."

== Antebellum career ==
Minor owned three sugar cane plantations: the 1,900-acre Waterloo Plantation in Ascension Parish, Louisiana, as well as the 6,000-acre Southdown Plantation and the 1,400-acre Hollywood Plantation in Terrebonne Parish, Louisiana. However, as an absentee plantation owner, he did not live on those plantations but at his residence near Natchez.

He hired overseers to force enslaved people to work on the plantations. He corresponded via mail with his overseers regularly, sending them precise instructions. Moreover, his sons lived on the plantations for part of the time. From 1855 to 1861, his son Stephen lived on the Waterloo Plantation until he joined the Confederate States Army; in 1862, his other son Henry took over. Another son, William, lived at the Southdown Plantation and also managed the Hollywood Plantation.

He served as the second President of the Agricultural Bank in Natchez, Mississippi. He was well connected among the planter elite, and visited planters Duncan F. Kenner (1813–1887) and Henry Doyal as well as the McCollums, the Cages, and the Gibsons. He read De Bow's Review and kept a diary.

Politically, he was a supporter of the Whig Party. He was in favor of tariffs on sugar, which meant more profit for domestic sugar producers like himself.

== American Civil War ==
During the American Civil War of 1861–1865, Minor supported the Union and opposed secession, as he believed that would be bad for the sugar industry. Minor was arrested by U.S. forces with his son Henry in Houma in 1862; they were released a week later in New Orleans. Meanwhile, U.S. Army troops seized sugar and molasses from Minor's Hollywood and Southdown plantations, under the pretext that it had been deserted, even though overseers and servants were there.

Minor was on friendly terms with U.S. Generals Benjamin Butler (1818–1893) and Lorenzo Thomas (1804–1875), whose forces protected Concord (his Adams County, Mississippi, plantation) on September 29, 1863, and on March 10, 1864. Both during and after the war, Minor asked for reparations for the financial losses he experienced due to the requisition of commodities by the U.S. Army forces, to no avail. By 1863, the people he enslaved had become unwilling to work; they also killed hogs and sheep.

U.S. Army Major General Nathaniel P. Banks's January 29, 1863, General Order No. 12 required Minor to pay wages to the people that he had enslaved. The formerly enslaved people, no longer forced to labor under "the threat of punishment", were not motivated to work by initially paltry salaries; as a result, Minor withheld food rations if they failed to work. By 1865, Minor agreed to pay one-third of the crop profit at the Waterloo Plantation to the laborers he had once enslaved. Minor signed a collective bargain with workers at the Southdown and Hollywood plantations; they agreed to work ten hours every day except Sundays and received specific hourly wages. Minor agreed to clothe, feed and house them all.

Minor supported Abraham Lincoln, whom he called "the most conservative & ablest man in the Washington Government." Minor deplored his assassination, as he believed Lincoln would have been fair to Southern agriculturalists.

== Equestrianism ==
Like many other wealthy slaveholders in the Antebellum South, one of Minor's pastimes was horseracing and equine management. He was part of a lively community of elite 'racing' men who poured their time, money, and energy into racing horses, traveling to England to buy stock for their stables, and other activities related to the expensive hobby of equestrianism. Minor served as the Secretary of the Natchez Jockey Club. Minor visited Jerome Park Racetrack in 1866, while it was under construction.

Minor was also a regular contributor to The Turf, Field and Farm, an equestrian publication. Minor sometimes used the pseudonym "Redlander."

== Personal life ==
On August 7, 1829, Minor married Rebecca Ann (Gustine) Minor (1813–1887), the daughter of James Parker Gustine (1781–1818) and Mary Ann (Duncan) Gustine (1790–1863) of Philadelphia, Pennsylvania. They resided at Concord, his family residence, in Natchez, Mississippi. They had seven sons and one daughter, including John Duncan Minor (1831–1869). A Harvard graduate, Minor married Catherine Surget, the daughter of the planter Francis Surget.

== Death ==
Minor died of apoplexy on September 18, 1869, at the Southdown Plantation near Houma. Minor was buried at Concord in Natchez, Mississippi.

His obituary was published in The Turf, Field and Farm. It was republished in The Louisiana Democrat.
