= Concord (Natchez, Mississippi) =

Historic mansion in Mississippi, US

Coordinates: 31.564753°N 91.381466°W

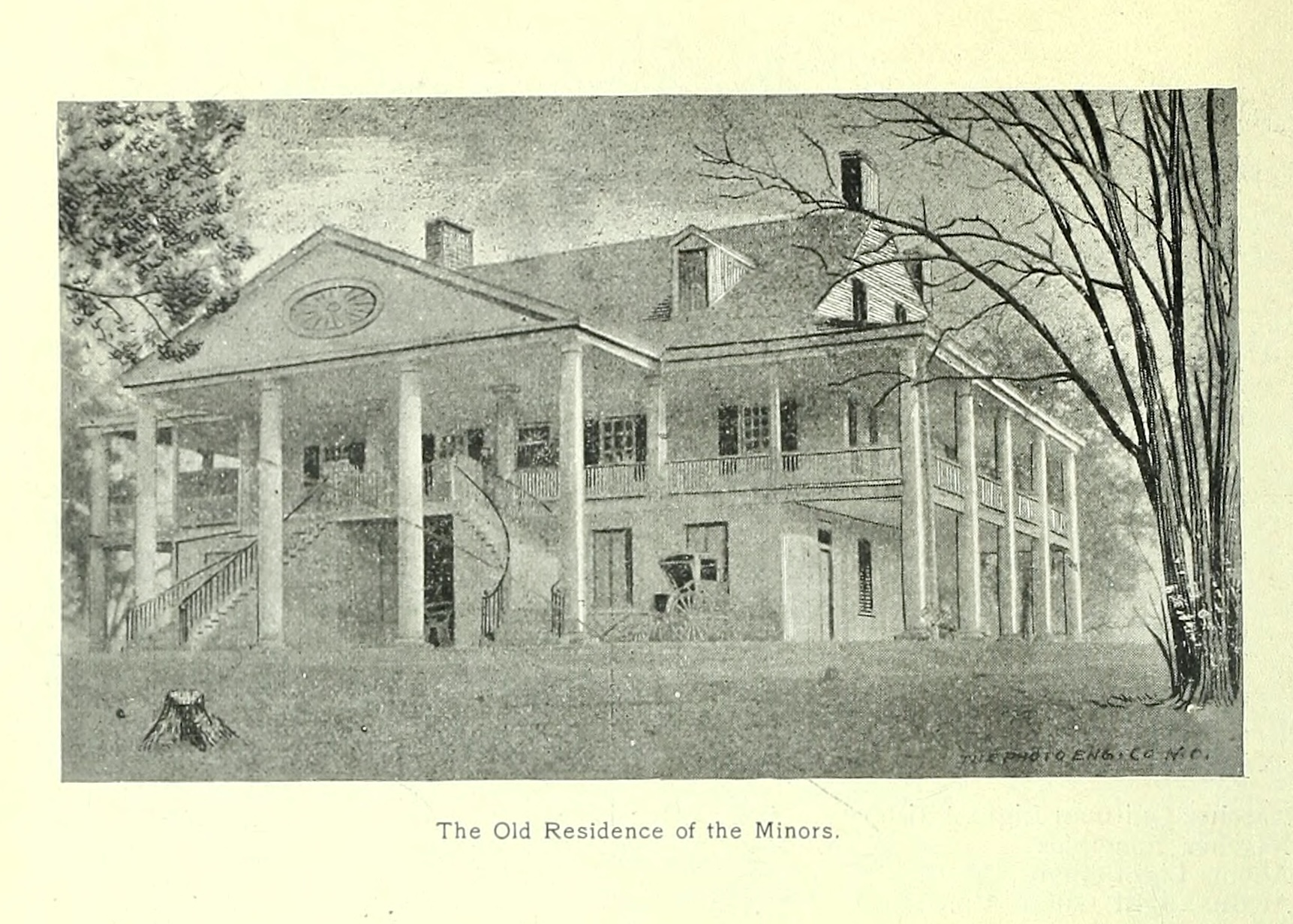
Concord in 1897

Concord was a historic mansion in Natchez, Mississippi. Built in 1789, it was the official residence of the Spanish Governors of Mississippi before it joined the United States. It was then acquired by the Minor family, who owned many Southern plantations, followed by a banker from New York. It burnt down in 1901.

== History ==
The mansion was built for Carlos de Grand Pré in 1789. It was then known as Grand Pre. It was later acquired by Manuel Gayoso de Lemos, who renamed it Concord. His wife, Princess Theresa de Hopman of Portugal, died at Concord. Significant restoration was completed in 1794 or 1795.

The mansion was then acquired by Stephen Minor, a banker and plantation owner. His son, William J. Minor, also a planter, inherited the mansion. In the era of the Confederate States of America, both President Jefferson Davis and Secretary of State Judah P. Benjamin were guests.

It was later acquired by Dr Stephen Kelly, a banker.

It burnt down in 1901.

== Description ==
The mansion was designed in the Spanish architectural style. Inside there were two circular staircases with marble steps.
