= Stephen Minor =

American governor and banker (1760–1815)

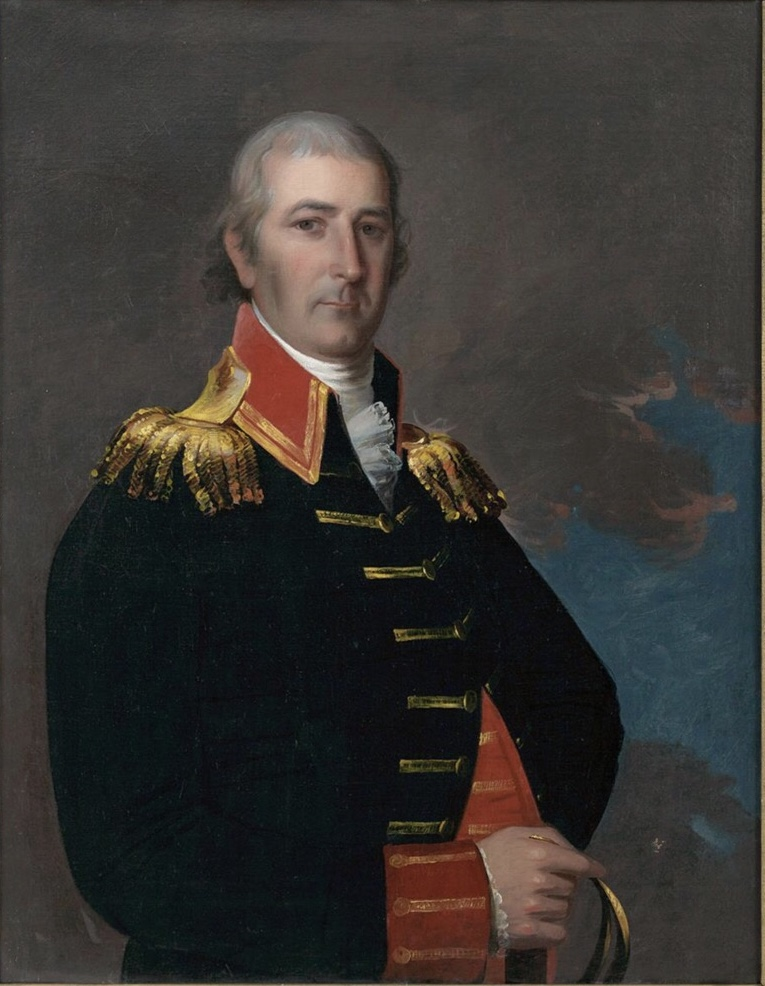
- Stephen (“Don Estevan”) Minor
- Born: February 8, 1760; Greene County, Pennsylvania
- Died: November 29, 1815 (aged 55); Natchez, Mississippi
- Occupations: Planter, banker
- Spouse(s): Martha (Ellis) Minor; Anna (Bingaman) Minor; Katherine (Lintot) Minor
- Children: 3, including William J. Minor

Stephen Minor (1760–1815) was an American who served as the last acting governor of the Spanish-held Natchez territory. He was a plantation owner and banker in the Southern United States.

== Family and early life ==
Stephen Minor's paternal ancestor Thomas Miner (1608–1690) had emigrated from Somerset in England to America in 1629. He and his family become prominent members of colonial New England. Five generations later, his great-great-great-grandson Stephen Minor was born to Captain William Minor and wife Frances Ellen Phillips Minor on February 8, 1760 in Greene County, Pennsylvania. During the revolutionary period, Captain Minor was an officier and recruiter for the colonial army. He was additionally involved in supplying equipment and although not formally aligned with the American colonists, the Spanish officials in Louisiana were an important source. This included gunpowder, canons and munitions for the revolutionary cause. As to Stephen, not much is known about his early life, but in 1779 (age 20) he had been part of expedition to New Orleans to procure this needed equipment.

== Service for Spain ==
In 1779 Stephen travelled to Spanish New Orleans as part of a group procuring military supplies for the Continental Army. “On the return trip up the western bank of the Mississippi he became ill with severe fever and chills. These prevented him from keeping pace with the other men and he was forced to lay back and catch up with the others once each event had subsided. Following one such episode, in the heart of “Indian country” of present day Arkansas, he followed the trail of his caravan only to discover that it had been attacked by bandits. The supplies had been stolen and the other members of his party had been murdered. Minor was left alone and sick in the Indian wilderness. Somehow he was able to make his way back to New Orleans where he eventually offered his services to the Spanish crown”. Spain had indirectly entered the American Revolutionary War on May 8, 1779 with a formal declaration of war on Great Britain by King Charles III. Even before this, however, the governor of Louisiana Bernardo de Gálvez had anticipated the coming conflict and had been assembling a Spanish Army to take on the British in West Florida. Though a network of spies he was aware that the British were planning an attack on New Orleans but before they could do so he decided to attack first. The British had established three forts along the lower Mississippi River to protect their western border of British West Florida. The first two, Fort Bute and Baton Rouge were quickly taken by force and the third Fort Panmure in Natchez surrendered without conflict. During this period Minor had attracted the attention of the Spanish officers and had volunteered his services to the Spanish army. In early 1780 Governor Gálvez undertook an expedition against Fort Charlotte in Mobile which was the last British frontier post capable of threatening New Orleans. Minor was chosen to be part of his personal body guard considered to be the finest body of men that could raised in New Orleans. It was siege of Fort Charlotte that Minor caught the eye of General Gálvez. He was impressed with his bravery and heroism as well as his “remarkable skill with a rifle” after Minor killed an Indian who was aiming at the governor. The capture of Fort Charlotte drove the British from the western reaches of West Florida and reduced their regional military presence to its capital Pensacola which fell in May 1781. In return for his military services under Galvez, Minor was accorded the rank of Captain and in 1791 received large land grants in Louisiana and Mississippi. In 1783 Minor was appointed adjutant of the military post at Natchez. He assisted the fort commanders (Felipe Treviño 1783-85; Francisco Bouligny 1785-86; Carlos de Grand Pré 1786-98) as well as Manuel Gayoso de Lemos the district governor 1787–98 with various administrative duties while providing the Anglo-American settlers a district liaison with the Spanish officials. In this capacity he was often referred to “Don Esteban.” During the West Florida Controversy he was appointed as one of the Spanish commissioners responsible for establishing the boundary between Florida and the United States. After Gayoso's departure in late 1797 he served as the acting Spanish governor of the Natchez District until April 1798 when Spain evacuated the region which under the Pinckney's Treaty of 1795 was to be ceded to United States. Minor along with the Consul José Vidal continued to command the Spanish forces which were relocated to Vidalia, Louisiana across the river from Natchez. He additionally served as one of the Spanish boundary commissioners after the Louisiana Purchase in 1803.

Minor was in the service of Spain for most of his adult life and was greatly respected by the Spanish, the colonial Americans and Native Americans. William Dunbar, a contemporary who owned Forest Plantation south of Natchez said Minor "endeared himself to his countrymen, the American settlers, by his acts of friendliness and protection," and that when advice or help was needed, he was sought".

== Property and business interests ==
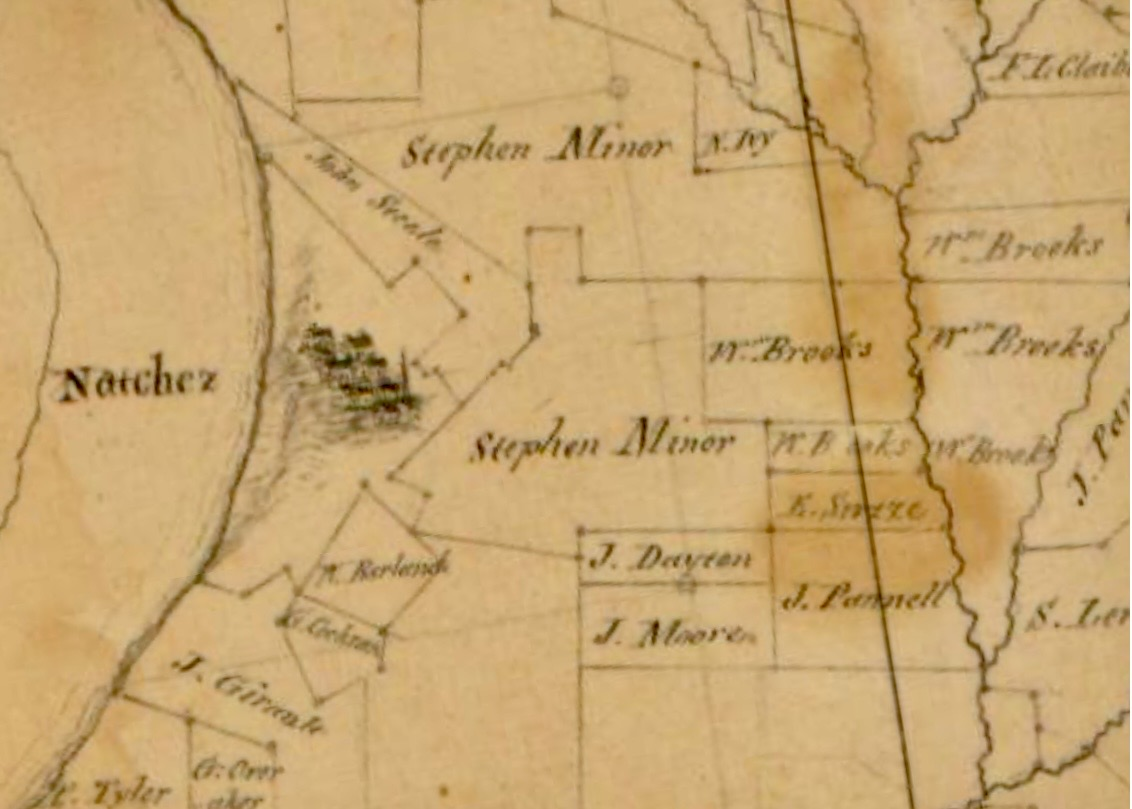
Natchez and surrounding plantations in 1810

He resided in Natchez, Mississippi from 1780 to 1815. His land grants included vast holdings in current Mississippi and Louisiana. These were subsequently developed into nine separate plantations and he originally held most of the land that became the current day city of Natchez. In 1797 he purchased the estate Concord which had been built by Governor Gayoso as the official residence of the Spanish Governors of the Natchez District. In 1797, Minor's plantations produced 2500 bales of cotton and he ranked as one of Natchez's richest citizens in the first two decades of the 1800s.

In addition to planting, he served as the first President of the Bank of Mississippi from 1797 to 1815. As of 1812 the bank was capitalized at $500,000 and the other directors were Ferdinand L. Claiborne, Samuel Postlethwaite, William Shields, Wm. Brooks, John Hankerson, Lyman Harding, Wm. G. Forman, Jeremiah Hunt, Lewis Evans, Jas. McIntosh, Thos. Wilkins, and Jas. C. Wilkins. In 1814 Minor was in possession of "1,476 acres and 140 enslaved people for a total tax due assessment of $152.92, representing the highest tax paid in Adams County for that year."

== Personal life ==
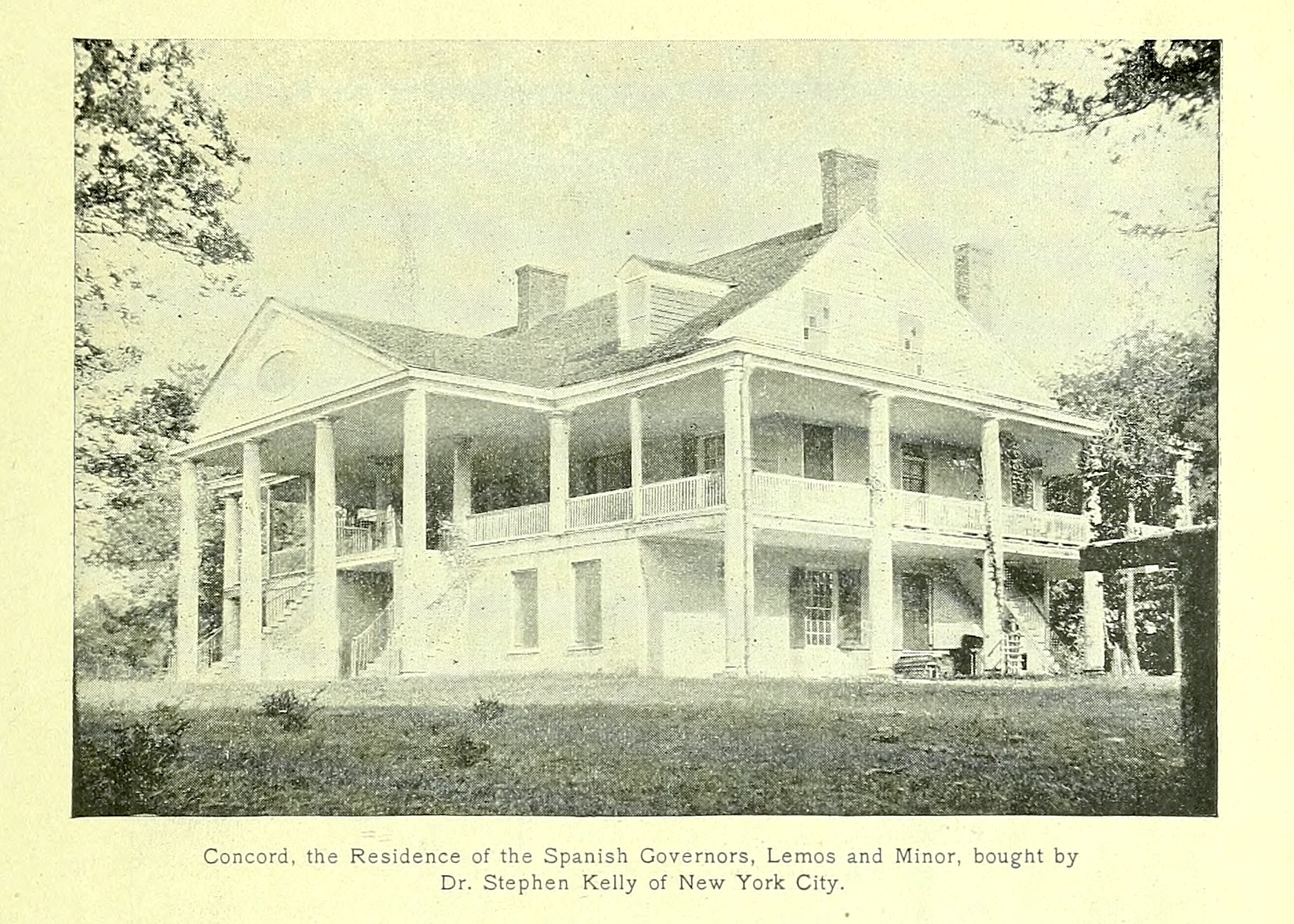
Concord, Minor's Natchez mansion, photographed in the late 19th century (The memento, old and new Natchez, 1700 to 1897)

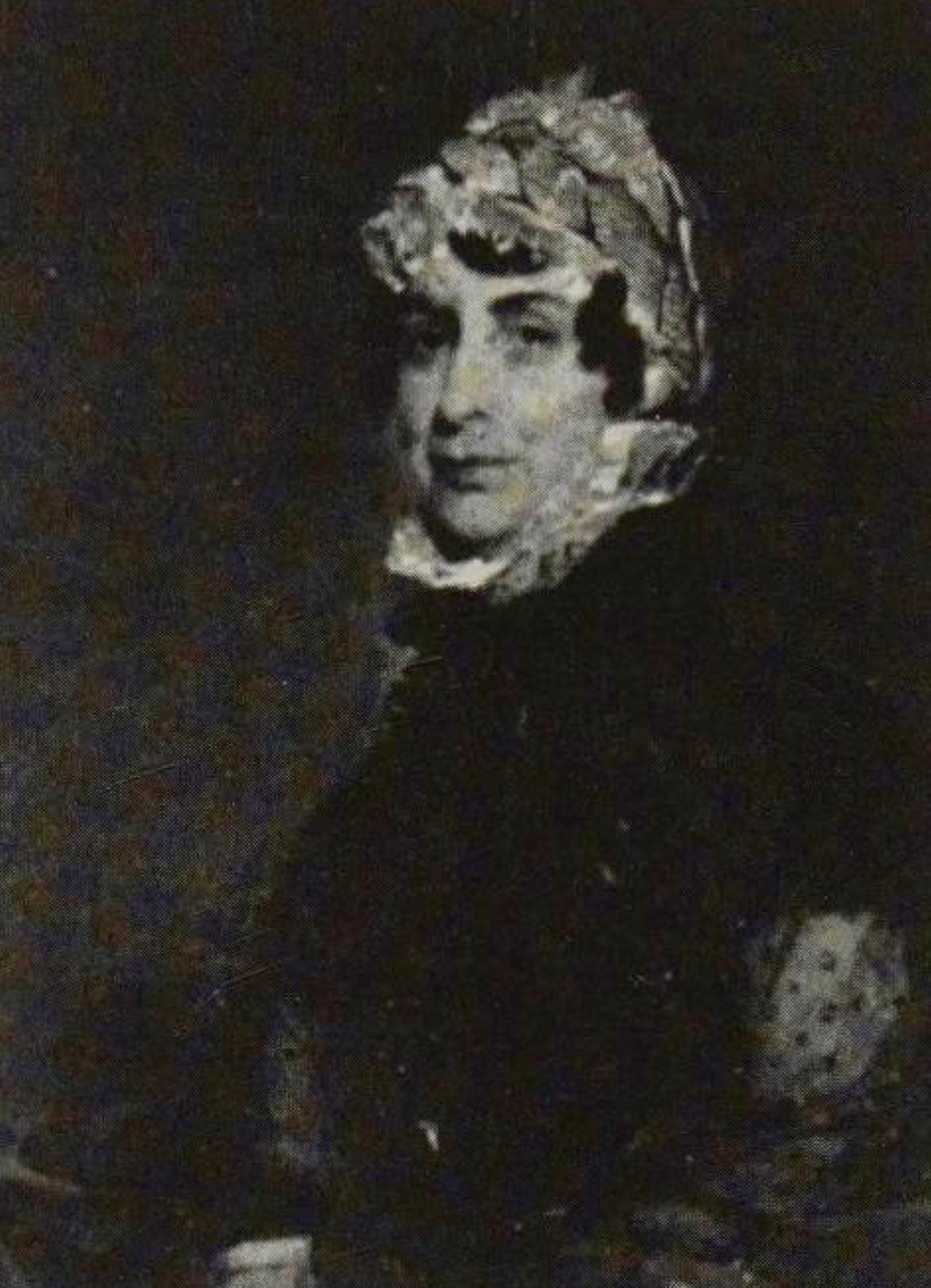
Katherine Lintot Minor (1770–1844), "the Yellow Duchess"

Stephen Minor was married three times, all to members of prominent families from the Natchez district.

- His first wife was Anna Bingaman, but little information is available other than she died shortly after their marriage. (She was likely a daughter of Christian Bingaman Sr. and a sister of Adam Bingaman.)
- His second wife was Martha Ellis, who was the daughter of Richard Ellis of White Cliffs Plantation. They married in about 1784 and had two daughters Mary Ann Minor and Martha Minor.
  - Martha Minor died young
  - Mary Minor m. William Kenner, cotton broker and planter with large sugar cane holdings in Louisiana
- Stephen's wife Martha died in about 1792 and shortly thereafter, August 4, 1792, he married for a third time to Katherine Lintot, the daughter of Bernard Lintot. Bernard Lintot was married to Catherine Trotter and "the Lintots once owned the building on Washington Street now known as the Sisters Home, which is a rarely fine piece of early Georgian architecture with an exquisite doorway. The Lintots also founded Leisure Hill plantation and reared a family from which sprung many of our first citizens. Both Mr. and Mrs. Lintot were from old English families, and many of the early Lintots were buried with the royal dead in West Minister Abbey." Katherine Lintot was born in Connecticut in 1770. She was known as "the yellow duchess" because of "her reputed fondness for all things golden." The story, first popularized in Harnett T. Kane's 1947 Natchez on the Mississippi, has it that "Catherine Lintot Minor was so enchanted by the color yellow that she enveloped herself in It. Every dress she wore was yellow, as was her entire ensemble down to the feather in her hat. She entertained her guests in a drawing room that 'glimmered with yellow walls, yellow carpets on the floor, mirrors and cornices of gold, sofas and chairs to match, mantel of tawny shade,' Kane wrote. Craftsmen installed golden cloth in her yellow coach; she searched until she found four horses of golden hue, and even her house servants were mulattoes of yellow tint." They had four children: Frances Lintot Minor, Katherine Lintot Minor, Stephen Lintot Minor Jr., and William John Minor. Katherine Lintot Minor lived at Concord until her death in 1844.
  - In 1819, judge Edward Turner performed the wedding of Frances Minor to Maj. Henry Chotard of the U.S. Army. Chotard survived until 1870. Farar Benjamin Conner married their daughter Marie Chotard in 1889. Henry Chotard's sister Marie Chotard was married to Levin R. Marshall.
  - In 1823, Katherine Lintot Minor married businessman James C. Wilkins.
  - William J. Minor (1807–1869) married Rebecca A. Gustine of Philadelphia
  - Stephen Minor Jr. married Charlotte Walker, sister of Robert J. Walker and Duncan S. Walker. He may have attended Phillips Exeter and died in 1830.

== Death ==
He died on November 29, 1815, in Natchez, Mississippi.

== Sources ==
- Agee, Phil (September 2022). Debt-Driven Settlerism: Small Farmers and Bankers in the Trans-Appalachian South, 1800–1820 (M.A. Liberal Studies). City University of New York (CUNY) Graduate Center.
- Rothstein, Morton (1979). "The Changing Social Networks and Investment Behavior of a Slaveholding Elite in the Ante Bellum South: Some Natchez Nabobs, 1800–1860". In Greenfield, Sidney M.; Strickon, Arnold; Aubey, Robert T. (eds.). Entrepreneurs in Cultural Context. School of American Research, Advanced Seminar Series. Albuquerque: University of New Mexico Press. pp. 65–88. ISBN 978-0-8263-0504-6. LCCN 78021433. OCLC 4859059.
