= James C. Wilkins =

Mississippi territorial legislator (1787–1849)

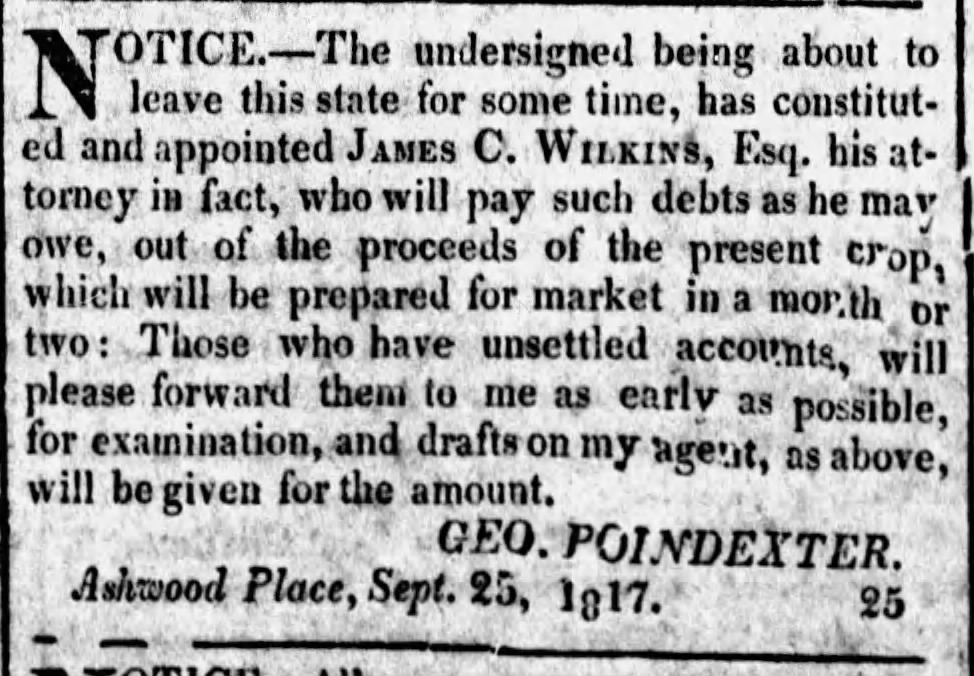
- In 1818, Wilkins was appointed to handle U.S. Representative George Poindexter's affairs while he was out of state
- Born: October 23, 1787; Pennsylvania, U.S.
- Died: April 9, 1849 (aged 61); Louisville, Kentucky, U.S.

James Campbell Wilkins (October 23, 1787–April 9, 1849) was an American businessman and political figure who served as a Mississippi territorial legislator, prospered as merchant of Natchez district, and owned thousands of acres and hundreds of slaves in the lower Mississippi River valley in the first half of the 19th century.

== Biography ==
Wilkins was a son of U.S. Army general John Wilkins Jr. He was born in Pittsburgh, Pennsylvania, but came to Mississippi when he was young. He may have spent some time in the vicinity of Carlisle, Pennsylvania before relocating to the Natchez where he was selling imported "iron and steel farm equipment" around 1802. He arrived in the Natchez District around 1805. His uncle Charles Wilkins, based in Lexington, Kentucky, was a "merchant and provisioner of the U.S. Army's work on the Natchez Trace road (1801–1807)". Another notable uncle was William Wilkins of Pittsburgh.

He was a selectman of the city of Natchez in 1812. As of 1812 he was a director of the Bank of Mississippi, capitalized at $500,000, along with Stephen Minor, Ferdinand Claiborne, Samuel Postlethwaite, Wm. Brooks, John Hankerson, Lyman Harding, Jeremiah Hunt, William Gordon Forman, Lewis Evans, Jas. McIntosh, and Thos. Wilkins. According to the curator of the Natchez Trace Collection at the University of Texas at Austin, "Wilkins accumulated several plantations through foreclosure and speculation. Most of his land was outside of Adams County, but in 1812 he owned 4,678 acres and 214 slaves in the county."

As of 1815, he ran a cotton-commission business in Natchez, owned 4,678 acres (7.309 mi^{2}), and owned 277 slaves. Based on tax returns, he was one of the richest men of the Natchez District prior to the War of 1812, along with fellow merchants like Abijah Hunt, and full-time planters like Adam Bingaman and Winthrop Sargent. The cotton business was the basis of his wealth, and according to J. F. H. Claiborne, "He controlled for a long time the commerce of Mississippi, and nearly all the cotton it produced." Wilkins organized a company, the Natchez Rifle Corps, during the War of 1812 and had a modest role in the Battle of New Orleans. The company continued to function as a militia and social society after the war.

He was at one time the president of Planter's Bank of Mississippi. Planter's Bank once had capital of $4 million and had "branches at Manchester, Vicksburg, Port Gibson, Woodville, Monticello, Jackson, and Columbus." According to the University of Texas Center for American History, he was "associated prominently with four banks at Natchez (1824–1840), but he lost most of his fortune in 1841".

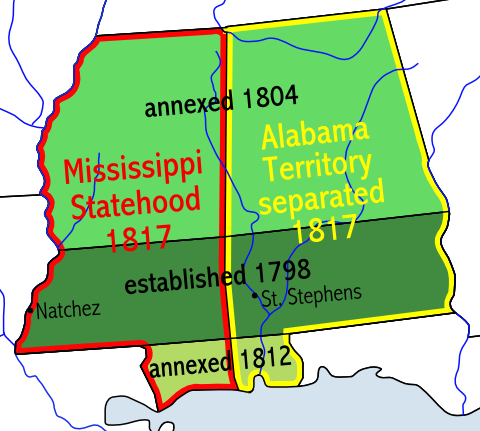
Historic map of Mississippi Territory

Wilkins was one of the representatives from Adams County in the ninth House of Representatives of the Mississippi territorial legislature, convening in 1815. Wilkins was a key figure in the push for Mississippi statehood within its current boundaries. He is remembered for drafting a message to the U.S. Congress in December 1816 that argued that "between those sections of the Country there is no natural or a commercial connection...The Revenue derived from the Wealth and Industry of the Inhabitants of the Counties near the Mississippi would be expended in a section of the Country with which they have only a forced connection." The message was signed by 12 territorial legislators. In March 1817, the Congress passed and U.S. President James Madison signed legislation separating the Alabama Territory from the Mississippi Territory. Wilkins was also heavily involved in drafting the first Mississippi state constitution. After statehood he was one of the leaders of the so-called Natchez Junto political advocacy group, which supported Andrew Jackson's presidential candidacy. Wilkins apparently worked more effectively as a "shrewd manager" behind the scenes rather than a candidate for major office. He was a candidate to be a representative to the United States Congress in 1830 "but was easily defeated by Franklin Plummer."

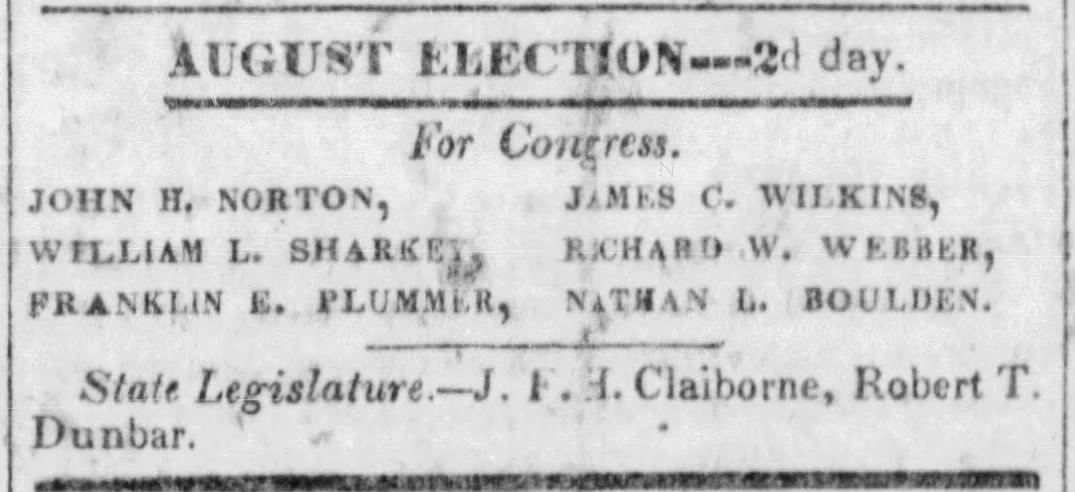
"August Election—2d day" The Weekly Natchez Courier, June 19, 1830

From 1816 to 1834, he was business partners with John Linton in the firm of Wilkins & Linton in New Orleans. Linton and Wilkins were both married to sisters of Adam L. Bingaman, daughters of Charlotte Surget and Adam Bingaman. His papers include correspondence about the 1836 "sale and transportation...of a group of fifty slaves from Baltimore, Maryland, by J.S. Skinner". In the 1830s he was part of a land-speculation scheme organized by future U.S. Senator from California William Gwin; the syndicate dealt in land in Mississippi, Arkansas, and Texas.

In January 1840 Wilkins was one of the co-sponsors of a grand dinner at Natchez to celebrate guest of honor Andrew Jackson, who, despite being quite ill and frail, had come to the lower Mississippi to celebrate the 25th anniversary of the Battle of New Orleans. Wilkins was involved in a community ceremony honoring the late Thomas Hinds when he died in 1840. Following the catastrophic 1840 Natchez tornado, Wilkins presided over a community meeting to plan the recovery and reconstruction.

In the 1840s the firm Wilkins, Humason & Co. ran a foundry in Natchez that produced engines for mills, gin houses, and steamboats. He reportedly lost his fortune in 1841. According to Claiborne, this was primarily as a result of guaranteeing other people's debts.

Wilkins died in Louisville, Kentucky, and his remains were returned to Natchez for burial. A collection of his papers is held at the University of Texas at Austin.

== Personal life ==
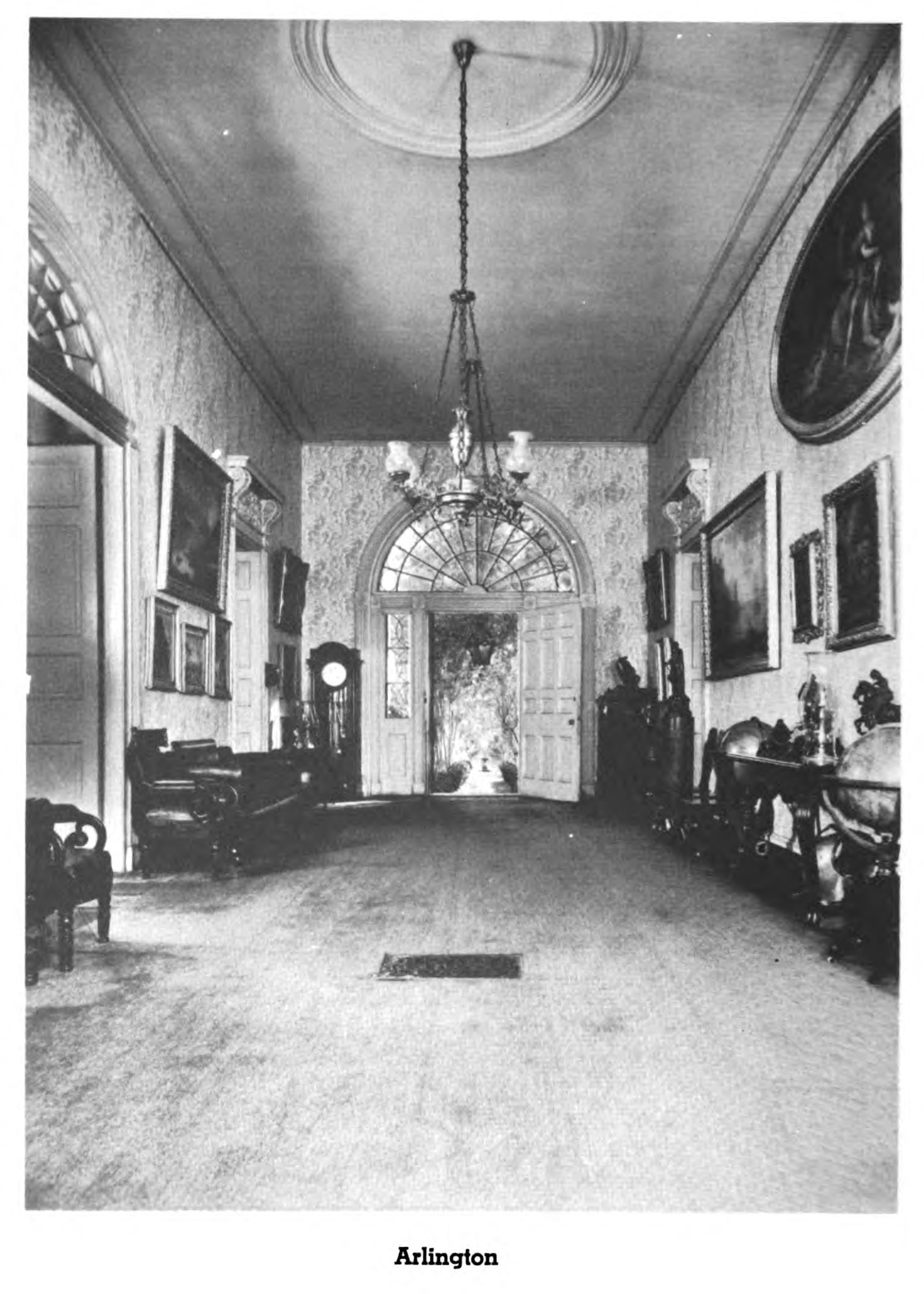
Wilkins' daughter and her husband S. S. Boyd lived at Arlington

Wilkins was married at least twice.

- He married first, in 1810, Charlotte Bingaman. She was a daughter of Adam Bingaman and a sister of Adam Lewis Bingaman. His wife Charlotte Wilkins died at Bay St. Louis in 1820 of yellow fever.
- He remarried in 1823, to Katherine Lintot Minor, a daughter of Stephen Minor. Historian Kimberly Welch found that in 1848 Katherine Minor Wilkins sued her husband in Adams County Chancery Court. Her suit "referred to both the 1839 and 1846 Mississippi Married Women’s Property Acts in her bill of complaint against her husband, James Wilkins, and the trustee of her property, Samuel Davis. Some years before, Catherine had inherited $20,000 in stock from her father and $10,000 from her uncle. Her husband managed the property, and because he owned nothing of his own, her wealth supported their household and family. But, Catherine claimed, James was a poor manager, and their house was in disrepair. In light of 'the act of the Legislature in relation to the rights of married women passed in 1839, and its amendment of 1846,' Catherine insisted that she was 'competent to hold her property in her own name or the proceeds of it.' These laws granted her the capacity to manage and control her property, she told the court. She asked that the judge dismiss her trustee and remove the control of her property from her husband, who could not responsibly manage it. The judge agreed, and Catherine became the administrator of her property."
- In 1838 his daughter Catherine Wilkins married Natchez attorney Samuel S. Boyd at Arlington house.
- In 1853, Frances Chotard Wilkins, daughter of James C. and Catherine Wilkins, died at Concord.

== See also ==
- Natchez and Hamburg Railroad
- Title and rank in the antebellum U.S. South

== Sources ==
- Claiborne, John Francis Hamtramck (1880). Mississippi, as a Province, Territory, and State: with Biographical Notices of Eminent Citizens. Jackson, Miss.: Power & Barksdale. LCCN 00002482. OCLC 2108221. OL 24156390M.
- James, D. Clayton (1993) [1968]. Antebellum Natchez. Baton Rouge, Louisiana: Louisiana State University Press. ISBN 978-0-8071-1860-3. LCCN 68028496. OCLC 28281641.
- Rothstein, Morton (1979). "The Changing Social Networks and Investment Behavior of a Slaveholding Elite in the Ante Bellum South: Some Natchez Nabobs, 1800–1860". In Greenfield, Sidney M.; Strickon, Arnold; Aubey, Robert T. (eds.). Entrepreneurs in Cultural Context. School of American Research, Advanced Seminar Series. Albuquerque: University of New Mexico Press. pp. 65–88. ISBN 978-0-8263-0504-6. LCCN 78021433. OCLC 4859059.
- Young, Cory James (April 2019). "From North to Natchez during the Age of Gradual Abolition". The Pennsylvania Magazine of History and Biography. 143 (2): 117–139. doi:10.1353/pmh.2019.0014. ISSN 0031-4587. JSTOR 10.5215/pennmaghistbio.143.2.0117.
