= Samuel S. Boyd =

American attorney (1807–1867)

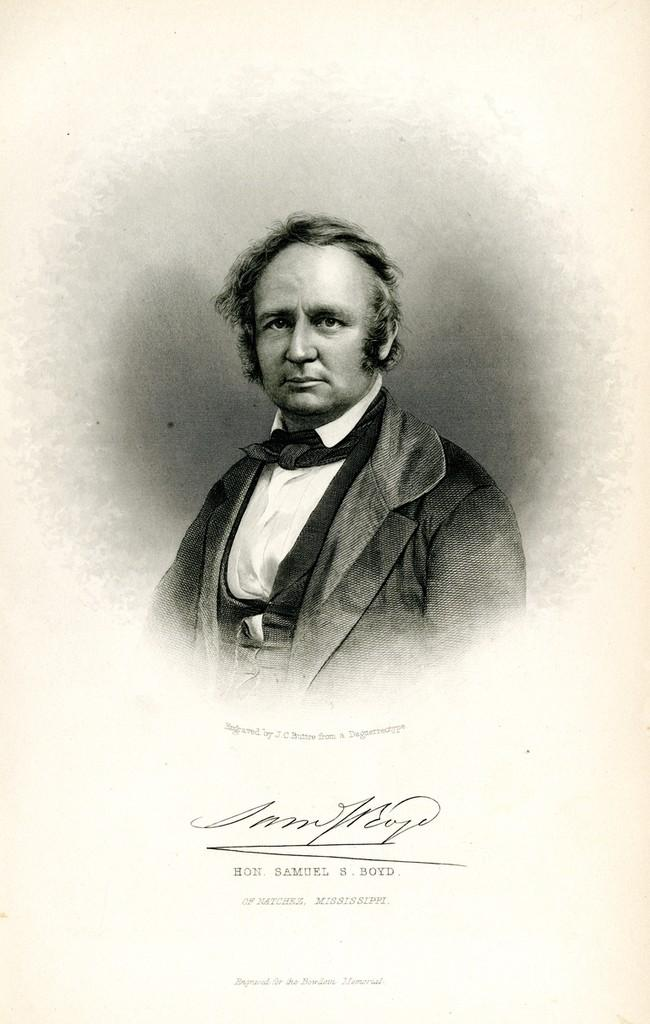
- Portrait by John Chester Buttre, 1882
- Born: May 27, 1807; Portland, Cumberland Co., District of Maine, Massachusetts, U.S.
- Died: May 21, 1867 (aged 59); Near Natchez, Adams Co., Mississippi, U.S.
- Other names: S. S. Boyd, Judge Boyd, the Old Man

Samuel Stillman Boyd (May 27, 1807 – May 21, 1867), often referred to as S. S. Boyd or Judge Boyd, was an American attorney in early 19th-century Mississippi and one of the Natchez nabobs who stood at the apex of antebellum Mississippi society. He also served briefly as a judge (possibly for just one special case), invested in cotton agriculture, speculated in real estate, engaged in large-scale enslavement, and advocated for pro-slavery causes. Boyd wielded significant political influence in his community, initially as a leader in the Whig Party. His name was considered for a seat on the U.S. Supreme Court in 1852 and 1860.

In addition to his legal career, Boyd entered into a business partnership with Rice C. Ballard, a former slave trader. Together, they established an "empire of plantations." Ballard's business records at the University of North Carolina provide valuable insights into American slavery and the slave trade, shedding light on Boyd's personal and professional endeavors. In the 21st century, Boyd is primarily remembered for letters detailing his mistreatment of enslaved African-American women. In one of the letters, another white man, a newspaper publisher and former municipal mayor, begs for help (from Boyd's business partner Ballard) in his attempt to rescue a woman Boyd enslaved, describing her suffering as blood streamed down her body as she was being whipped for offending Boyd in some way. In another letter, an enslaved woman wrote from exile in a slave trader's pen, shaming Boyd for his treatment of her after Boyd raped her and she gave birth to at least one of his children. Boyd also fathered a son by a third woman whom he enslaved and raped; this man's white half-sisters later hired him to manage family plantations.

== Biography ==
=== Early life and education ===
Boyd was born in Portland, in what was then Massachusetts' District of Maine, as the fourth-born child of future Maine State Treasurer Joseph Coffin Boyd and Isabella Southgate. Through his paternal grandmother, he was second cousins with the abolitionist Joshua Coffin. His mother, Isabella Southgate, was educated at Leicester Academy in the 1790s and was remembered decades later for both her beauty and her "extraordinary mind". Through her, Boyd was a cousin to Eliza Southgate Bowne and a grandnephew of Founding Father Rufus King. Boyd graduated as valedictorian of his Bowdoin College class of 1826. He delivered an address upon graduation on the topic of The Nature of Revolutions, and Their Influence on the Condition of Man. Boyd was two years behind future U.S. President Franklin Pierce at Bowdoin, and was also a classmate of future U.S. Representative S. S. Prentiss. Both Boyd and Prentiss settled in Mississippi and occasionally faced each other in court.

=== Move to Mississippi, legal career ===
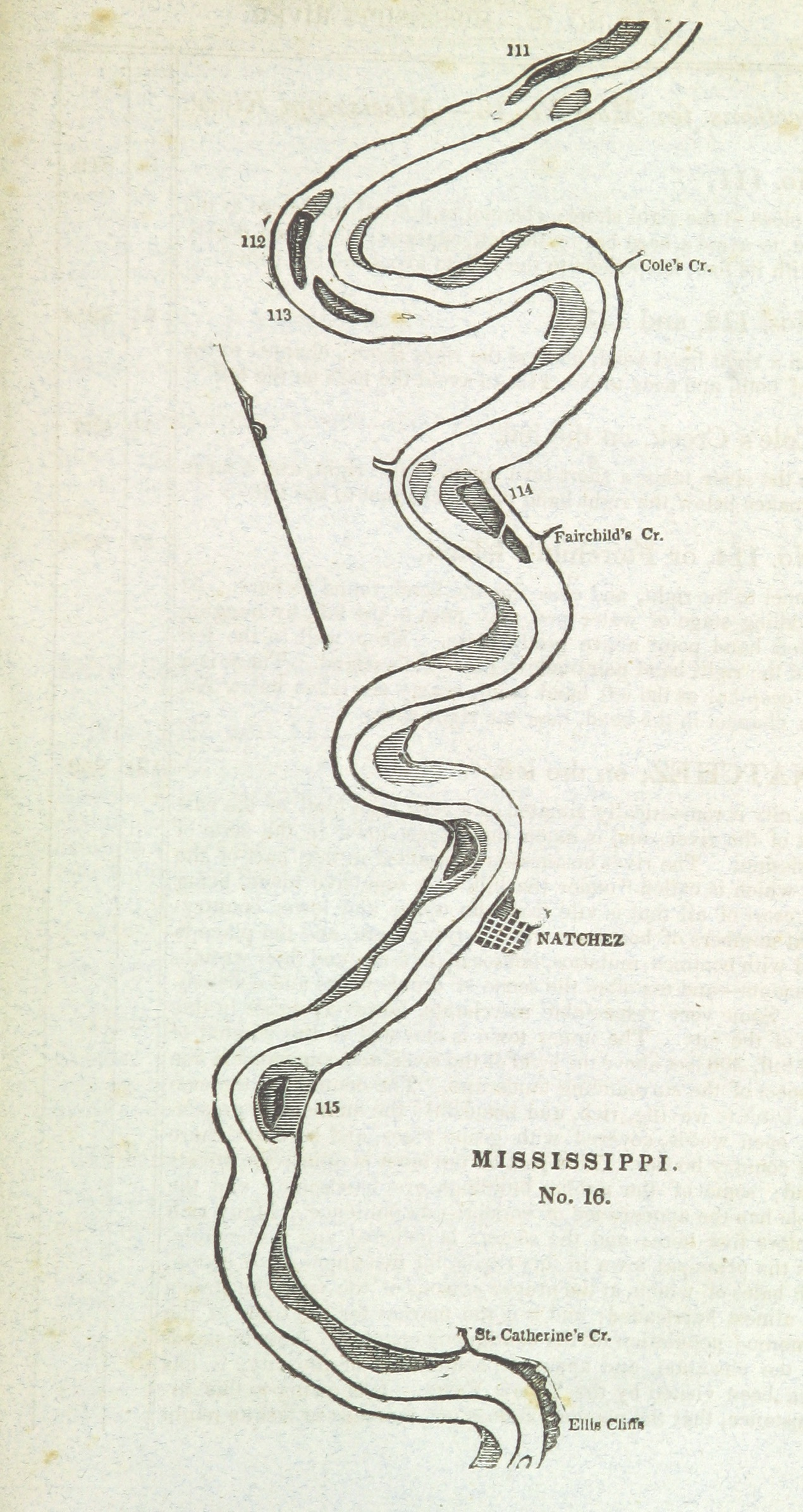
Mississippi River near Natchez in 1832

Boyd commenced his law practice in 1828 in Wilkinson County, and in 1836, he relocated to Natchez, Mississippi, situated in Adams County. There, he established his residence and remained for his life. In his Recollections of Mississippi and Mississippians (1889), former U.S. Representative Reuben Davis hailed Boyd as one of the "great men of Natchez". In 1836, the Rodney, Mississippi Telegraph newspaper reported Boyd's candidacy for criminal court judge for a five-county area. In 1839, Boyd ran as a candidate for the Whig Party in the Mississippi State Senate.

Boyd's attempts at political office appear to have been fruitless, but he succeeded as an attorney. After settling permanently in Natchez, he established a law firm in partnership with Alexander Montgomery. One historical account described Montgomery & Boyd as "a firm of high rank." Boyd was logical, highly educated, articulate, maintained a scholarly demeanor, and well-versed in legal matters. According to John Francis Hamtramck Claiborne, another U.S. Congressman from Mississippi, "no man commanded more confidence and respect throughout the State". According to Dunbar Rowland's Encyclopedia of Mississippi History (1907), Boyd's firm defended the will of Isaac Ross in a notable lawsuit brought by heirs, and in 1837, as a special judge, Boyd delivered the opinion of the High Court in the famous case of Vick vs. Vicksburg, although it was later reversed by the United States Supreme Court. Some sources credit Boyd as having served as a judge on the Mississippi High Court of Errors and Appeals in 1837, although it's uncertain if this was a permanent position or for a brief period. "Judge Boyd" was quite likely a general honorific rather than a professional title; as historian D. Clayton James wrote of the tight-knit group of wealthy white capitalists who lived in and around Natchez: "It would be difficult to find an antebellum newspaper reference to a Natchez nabob without a title such as 'Colonel' or 'Major.'"

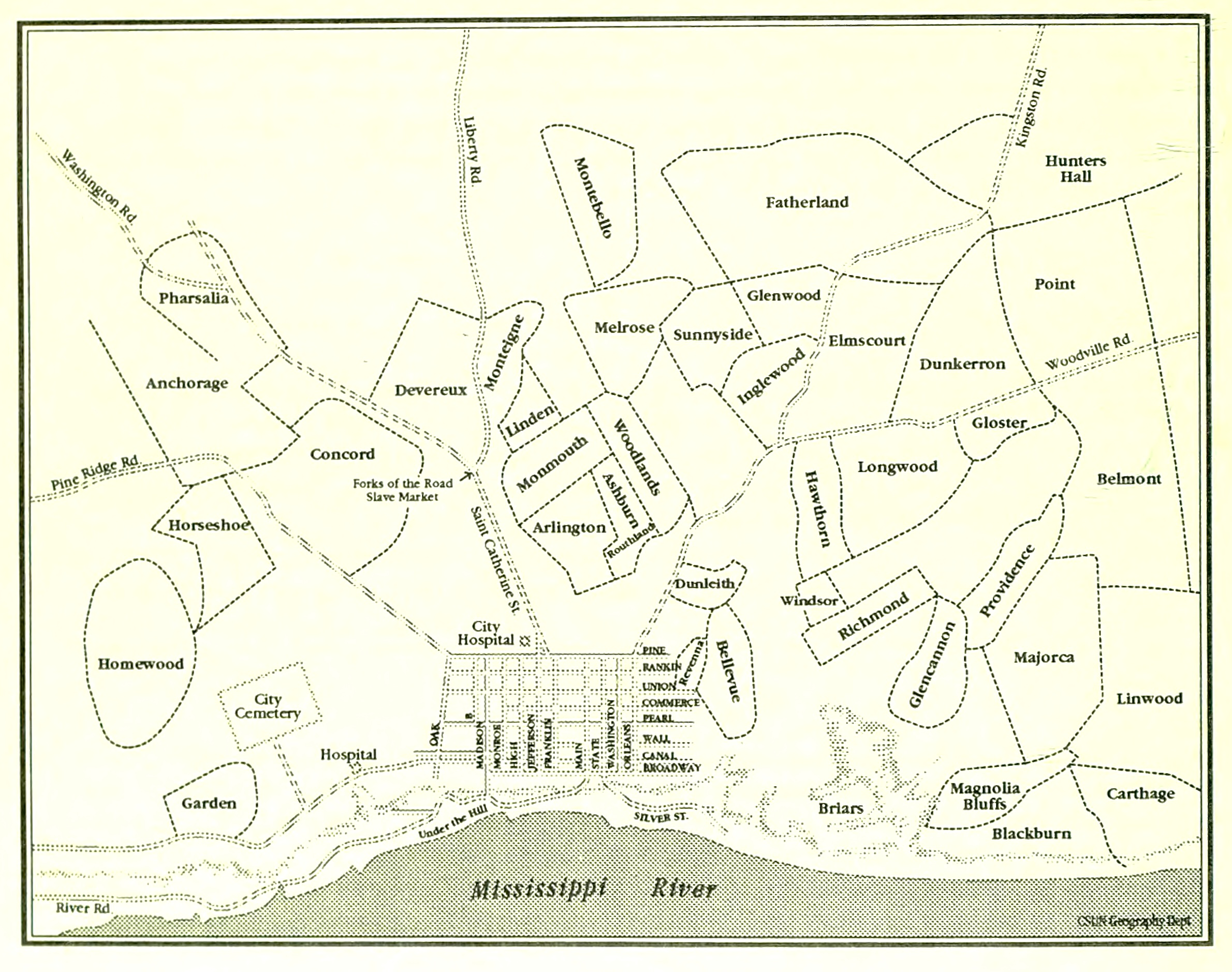
Arlington, State Street, Forks of the Road, and Natchez-Under-the-Hill, pictured in "Illustration F: Suburban Estates — c. 1830 to 1860" from The Black Experience in Natchez: 1720-1880, Special History Study by Ronald L. F. Davis (1993)

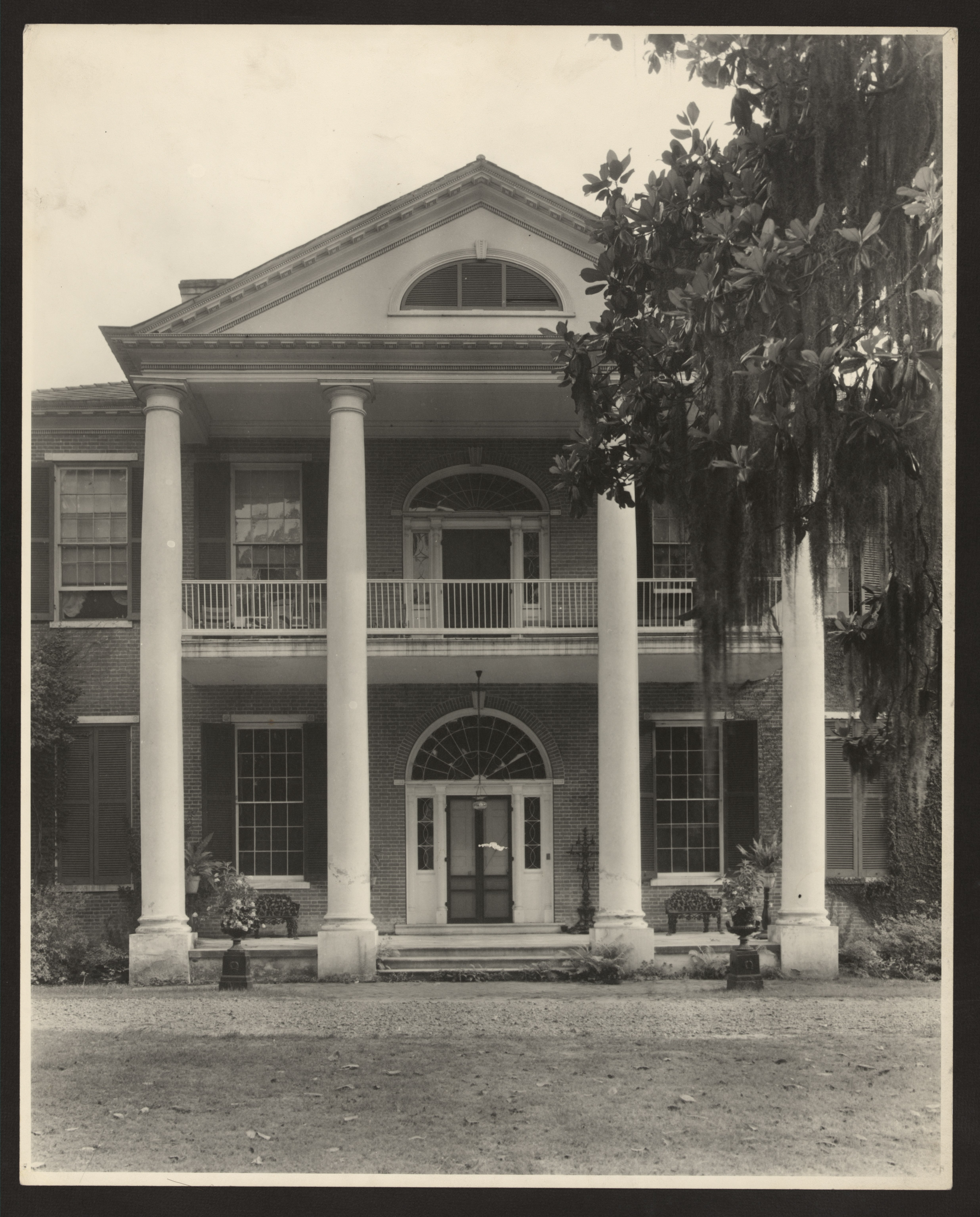
Photograph of the entrance and porch of Arlington, taken in 1934 during the New Deal's Historical American Building Survey. While Arlington still stands, it now exists as a derelict ruin.

In 1838, Boyd wed Catherine Charlotte Wilkins, the daughter of James C. Wilkins. James Wilkins had served in the Mississippi Territorial Legislature and was a prominent early banker in Mississippi. It was through Catherine's inheritance that Boyd acquired a grand residence just outside Natchez known as Arlington. Over time, Boyd utilized his wealth to establish a "fine old library" and adorn the home with artwork and furnishings from Italy. Harnett T. Kane's Natchez on the Mississippi states that, "He acquired one or two collections of paintings from impoverished British noblemen. To the splendor acquired by the Widow White, the Boyds added signed bronzes, figures in marble, and sets of oils that covered many walls. Romanticism was the theme, florid and flower-hung, the work of Italians and Spaniards; Magdalenes in the Desert ran rampant."

Arlington was part of a clutch of "suburban" mansions encircling Natchez that functioned more as symbols of affluence through conspicuous consumption than as traditional plantations. While cash crops like cotton and sugar were cultivated on distant labor-intensive plantations, these suburban estates served primarily as showcases of opulence. During Boyd's lifetime at Arlington, he turned the land around the house into "a wooded park, installing a gazebo or summer house, love seats among the floral patterns, and a rose garden."

In 1843, Boyd's younger sister, Augusta Murray Boyd, married future Confederate general Lloyd Tilghman. On January 17, 1844, a free person of color named William Johnson made an entry in his journal stating: "Baylor Winn brought up the three servants belonging to Judge Boyd. He told me that he caught them down in the woods close to the mouth of St. Catherine. He brought them up this morning. Young Gim Kenney has made his escape. He was the cause of their running away. They were put in jail.

=== Ballard and business ===
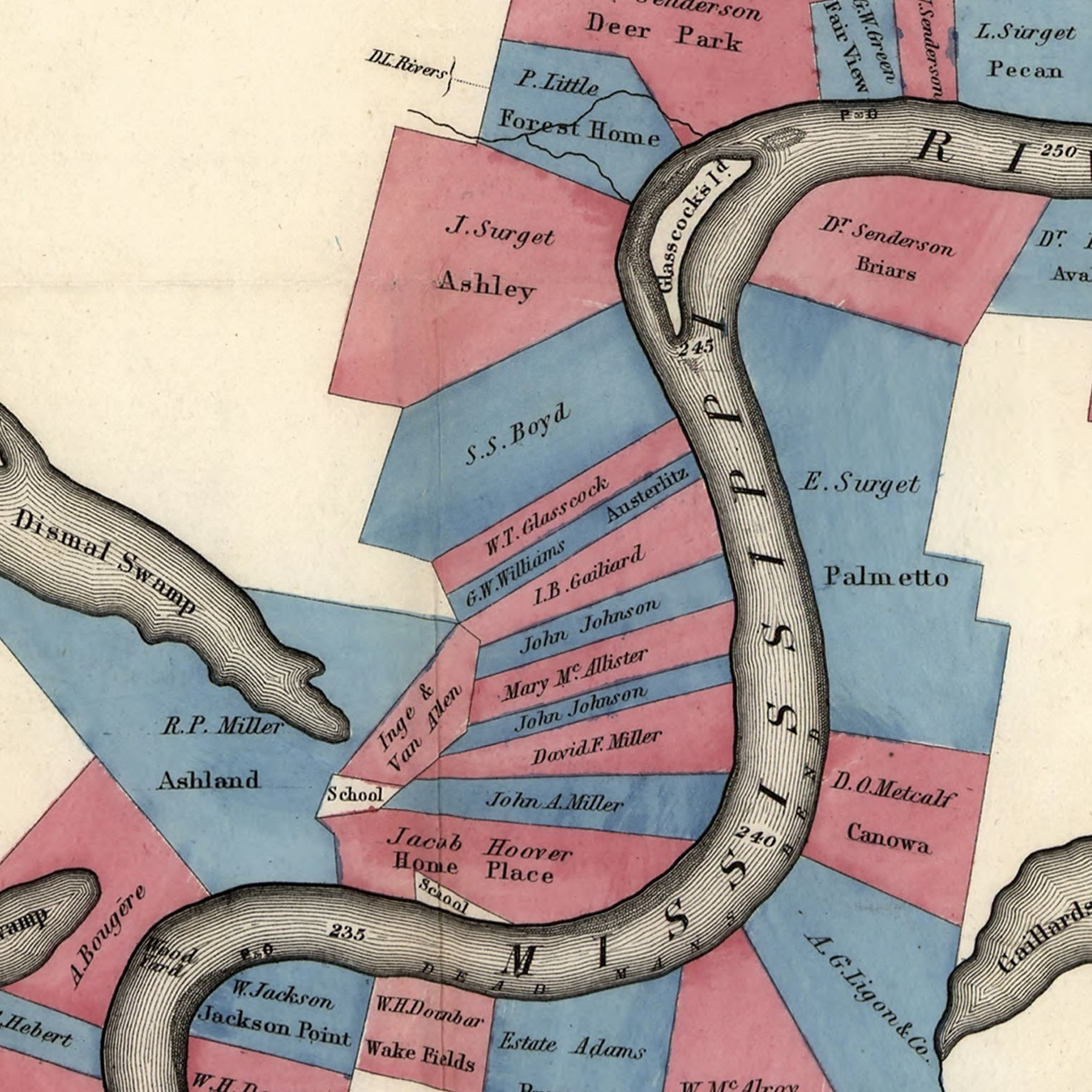
Detail of Norman's chart of the lower Mississippi River (1858) displaying a cotton plantation belonging to S. S. Boyd near Glasscock Island on the riverfront in Concordia Parish, Louisiana.

In 1839, Boyd assumed a directorial role at the Planter's Bank of Natchez, which was one of his father-in-law's enterprises. Around 1840, Boyd formed a connection with Rice C. Ballard, previously a prominent slave trader associated with the Franklin & Armfield company. Collaboratively, Boyd and Ballard established a network of slave-labor camps dedicated to cotton production for the lucrative international market. Although the precise ownership structure remains somewhat unclear, researchers estimate that they collectively invested in approximately 10 to 16 plantations.

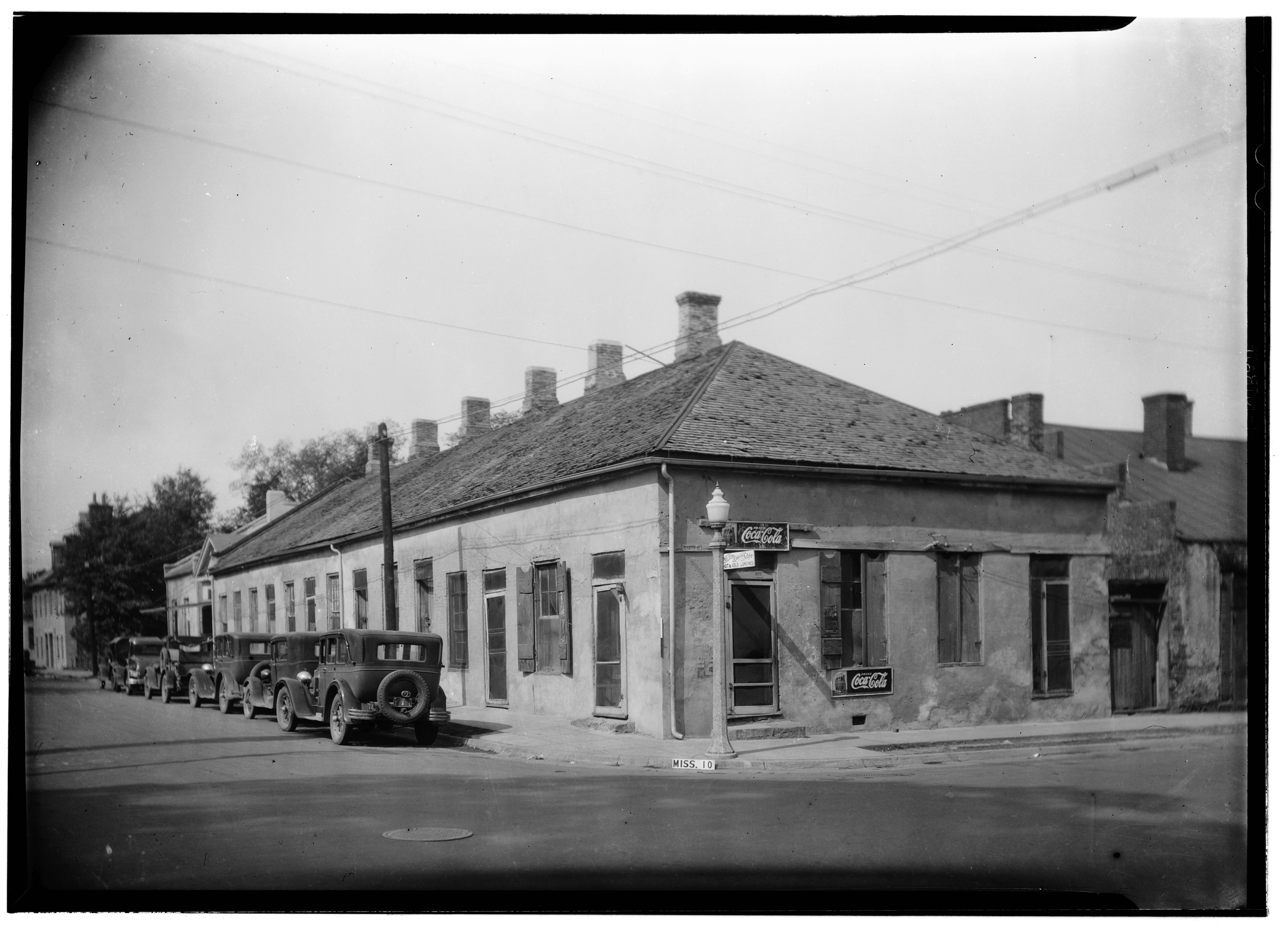
Lawyers' Row, State & Wall Streets, Natchez, photographed 1936

According to historian Tomoko Yagyu, "These plantations were typically owned jointly by Ballard and Boyd, although Boyd held sole ownership of some, and Ballard partnered with others for ownership." Operating primarily from Kentucky, Ballard entrusted Boyd and his brother James Boyd with the close management and administration of around twelve or so labor-intensive plantations within the Cotton Kingdom. These included Bushy Bayou, Elcho, Elk, Golden Plains, Karnac, Laurell Hill, Lepine, Magnolia, Outpost plantation (also known as Pecan Grove), Providence, Quattlebum, Wagram, and Woodland plantations. Additionally, there were possibly other plantations such as Forest Hill, Myrtle Grove, and Pine Mount, where Boyd and Ballard may have been involved.

The places owned by Ballard and Boyd had no stately homes or ornamental gardens. They were not showcases for wealthy white families. The only steady white presences on them at all were managers and overseers, few of whom stayed on for more than a few years. The Ballard and Boyd partnership owned places whose sole purpose was to make Black people live and labor under the threat of violence to produce cotton until they were considered useless, deemed dispensable, or died.

— Joshua D. Rothman, The Ledger and the Chain: How Domestic Slave Traders Shaped America (2021)

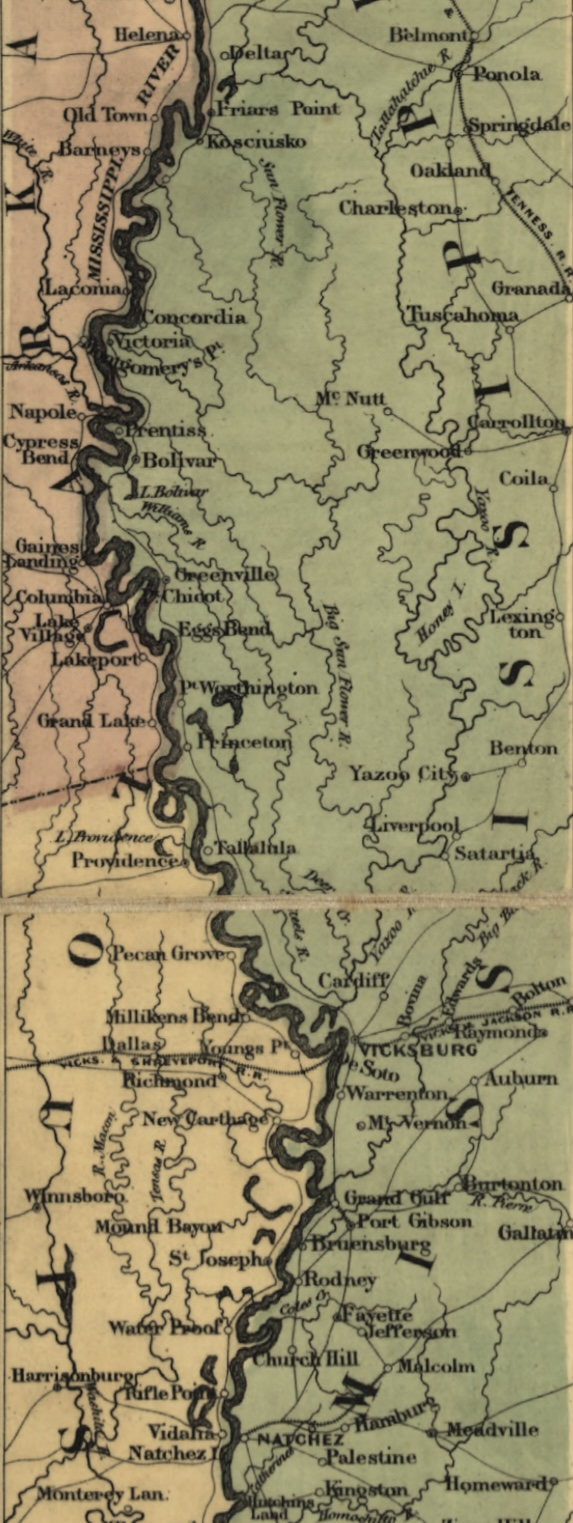
A depiction of the Mississippi River north of Natchez circa 1862 reveals boat landings identified as Providence and Pecan Grove, names that correspond to two of the plantations held by Boyd and Ballard.

Altogether, Boyd and Ballard collectively held approximately a thousand individuals in bondage across Arkansas, Louisiana, and Mississippi. At the time of the 1840 Natchez tornado businessmen "Mr. Ruffner and S. J. Boyd Esq." estimated the financial loss to be US$1,260,000 (equivalent to $40,635,000 in 2025). Letters from 1844, 1846, 1849, and 1852 make mention of attempted escapes by individuals or groups. In 1852, authorities in Wilkinson County, Mississippi, detained a 38-year-old man named Prince, who asserted that he was the legal property of "S. S. Boyd, near Natchez."

In 1857, Boyd acquired over 2,000 acres of "wild land" in Concordia Parish, Louisiana, for approximately US$16,000 (equivalent to $552,857 in 2025). According to Yagyu, "Boyd was a discerning land speculator, constantly vigilant, and always seeking out the finest lands for investment. He would frequently forward newspaper clippings of plantation sales in the area to Ballard and solicit his opinion. While Boyd was interested in any land that promised profit, he showed particular enthusiasm for affordable sugar plantations"

=== Political activism ===
As a literate, native-born white adult male with land ownership, Boyd was entitled to engage in the democratic processes of his era. The course of his political affiliations in the pre-war lower Mississippi Valley somewhat mirrored the changing politics that led to the South's disunionism.

==== 1848 presidential election: Dems in disarray ====
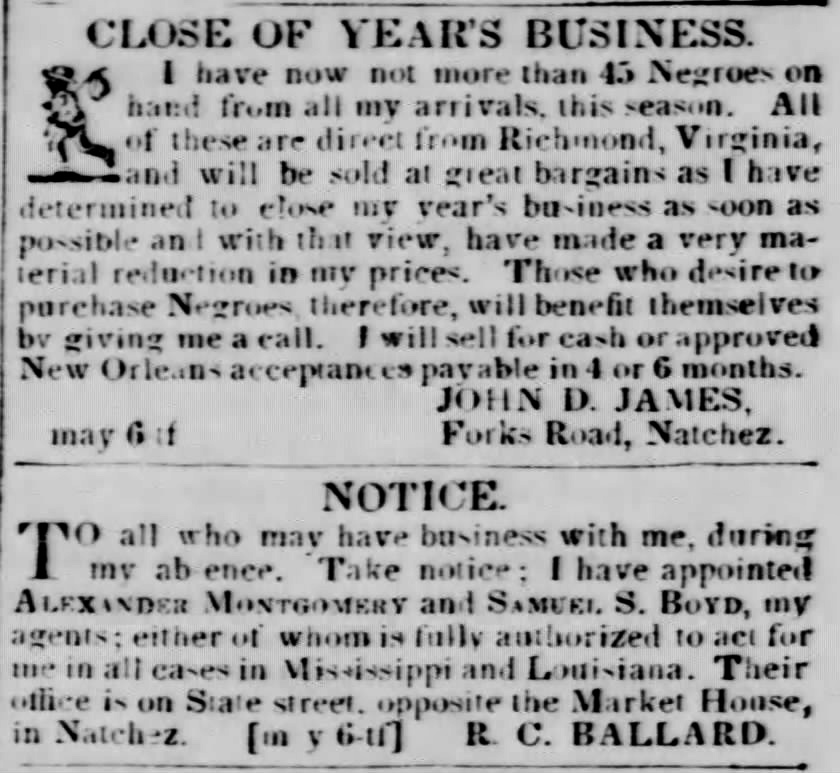
As the 1848 slave-trading season wrapped up for the year, John D. James was offering close-out prices at his Forks of the Road negro mart, and Rice C. Ballard was heading back, north leaving Boyd and Alexander Montgomery at an office on State Street opposite the Exchange Building in Natchez (The Concordia Intelligencer, Vidalia, Louisiana, May 27, 1848)

During an 1848 Whig Party political gathering, Boyd contended, as reported by the Natchez Mississippi Free Trader, that "Slavery ... was neither an institution nor strictly speaking property. It was a domestic relation; and seemed to infer, as a deduction, from this proposition that no man was safe who did not assume this to be the definition of the term. Of course General Cass was unsafe, as he was not a slave-holder". Following the election, Boyd gained widespread attention in 1848 when his account of a casual conversation with fellow Mississippi planter Zachary Taylor spread nationwide. According to Boyd's report, Taylor expressed a strong commitment to safeguarding slavery in the existing slave states. Boyd recounted Taylor's belief that the appropriate response to any efforts by free states to abolish slavery nationwide would be "drawing the sword and throwing away the scabbard". The news report stated that Boyd indicated Taylor "will go with the free States on the tariff and internal improvement questions, and with the slave States on the free soil question". This sparked intense debate in the press regarding its implications, if any, for the expansion of slavery in the newly colonized and settled territories to the west. One news analysis referred to Boyd as "radical on the slavery question".

==== Antebellum politics ====
In 1851, Montgomery and Boyd dissolved their law partnership, although Boyd would "continue in the practice of his profession as before". Also that year, Boyd was among several financial supporters of Narciso López's freelance military invasion of Cuba, where American pro-slavery activists hoped to advance the expansion of their peculiar institution. According to a history of Boyd's mother's family published in 1907, Millard Fillmore considered Boyd for an appointment to the U.S. Supreme Court in 1852, following the death of Associate Justice John McKinley. Boyd remained active in the Whig Party at the regional level. He refused to serve as Whig elector in 1852 because of his opposition to candidate Winfield Scott. In 1854, Boyd was selected to assist in revising the Mississippi criminal code, but he resigned before making a contribution and was replaced.

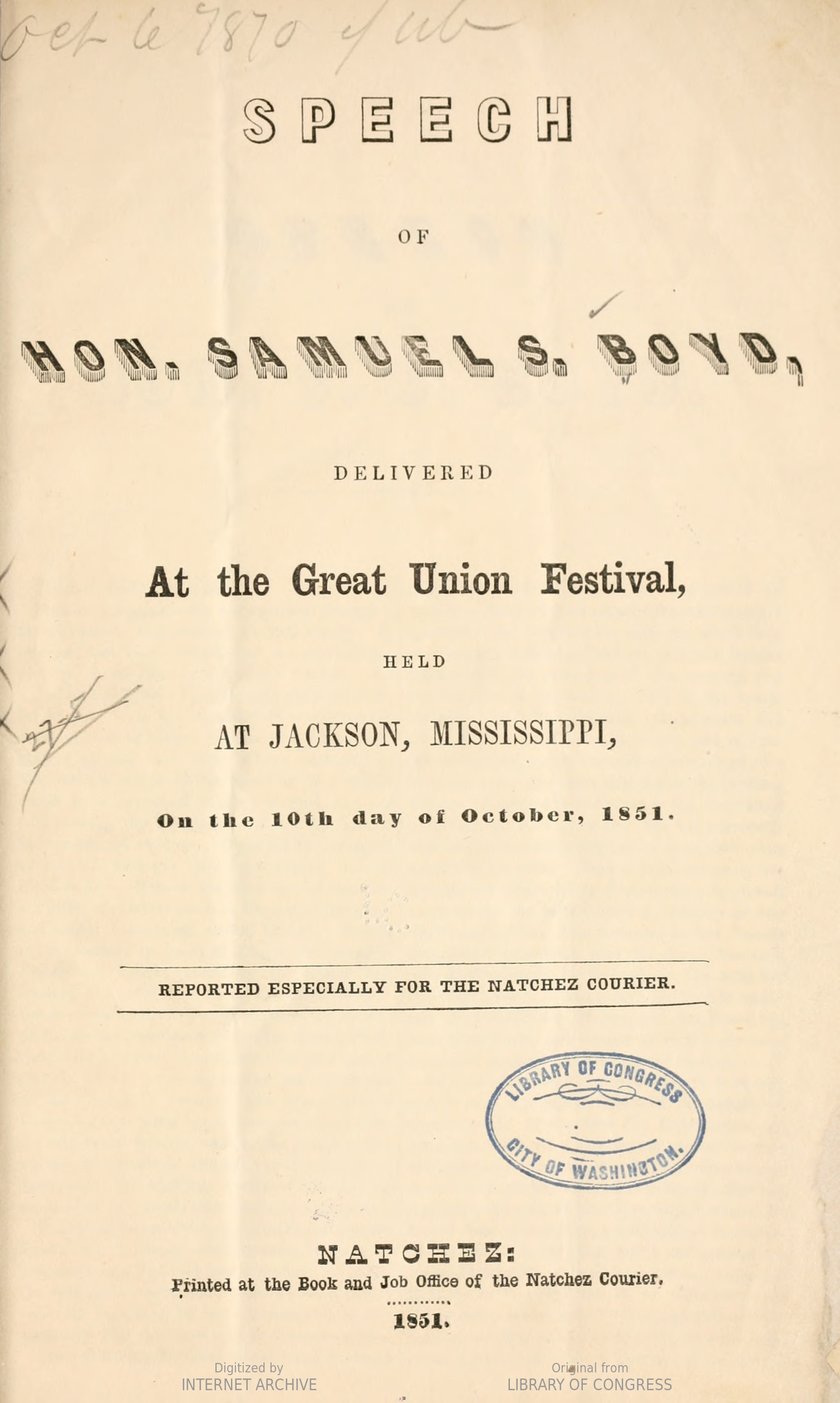
Boyd defended the Compromise of 1850 and argued against the notion of a constitutionally protected right to secession.

Boyd's most significant political action of the decade was a comprehensive and scholarly speech where he upheld the Compromise of 1850 as constitutionally justified and strategically advantageous for proponents of slavery. Boyd claimed in the speech that the American government was the world's only one "under which genuine liberty—liberty regulated by law—is enjoyed." He also claimed that abolitionism was a British ploy in an effort "to unite southerners together and appeal to a strong American nationalist sentiment." Most importantly, he opposed secession (which increasingly— or perhaps continuously since the Nullification Crisis— was being advocated by the South Carolinian political contingent led by "Mr. Rhett"). Boyd argued that there was no constitutionally protected right of people or states to secede (and very intentionally so on the part of the founders). Boyd also commended Andrew Jackson for his role in disrupting past attempts at disunion.

Marriage, legitimacy, bond-service and every species of contract, come under the same principle. A citizen of America may go to the territories acquired from Mexico, with his wife and children, his servants, whether bound for a term of years by contract, or held for life to service and labor under the laws of a State, without fear that he will be divorced, his offspring bastardized, and his relation of master destroyed by any fancied rule of national law ... we considered we had a full right above as well as below 36° 30', and the concession was, in being willing to divide the property and take half in absolute ownership, instead of an undivided interest in the whole, liable to be interfered with by anti-slavery restrictions.

— Samuel S. Boyd, October 10, 1851, defending the Compromise of 1850 and other American free state–slave state political compromises

=== American Civil War ===
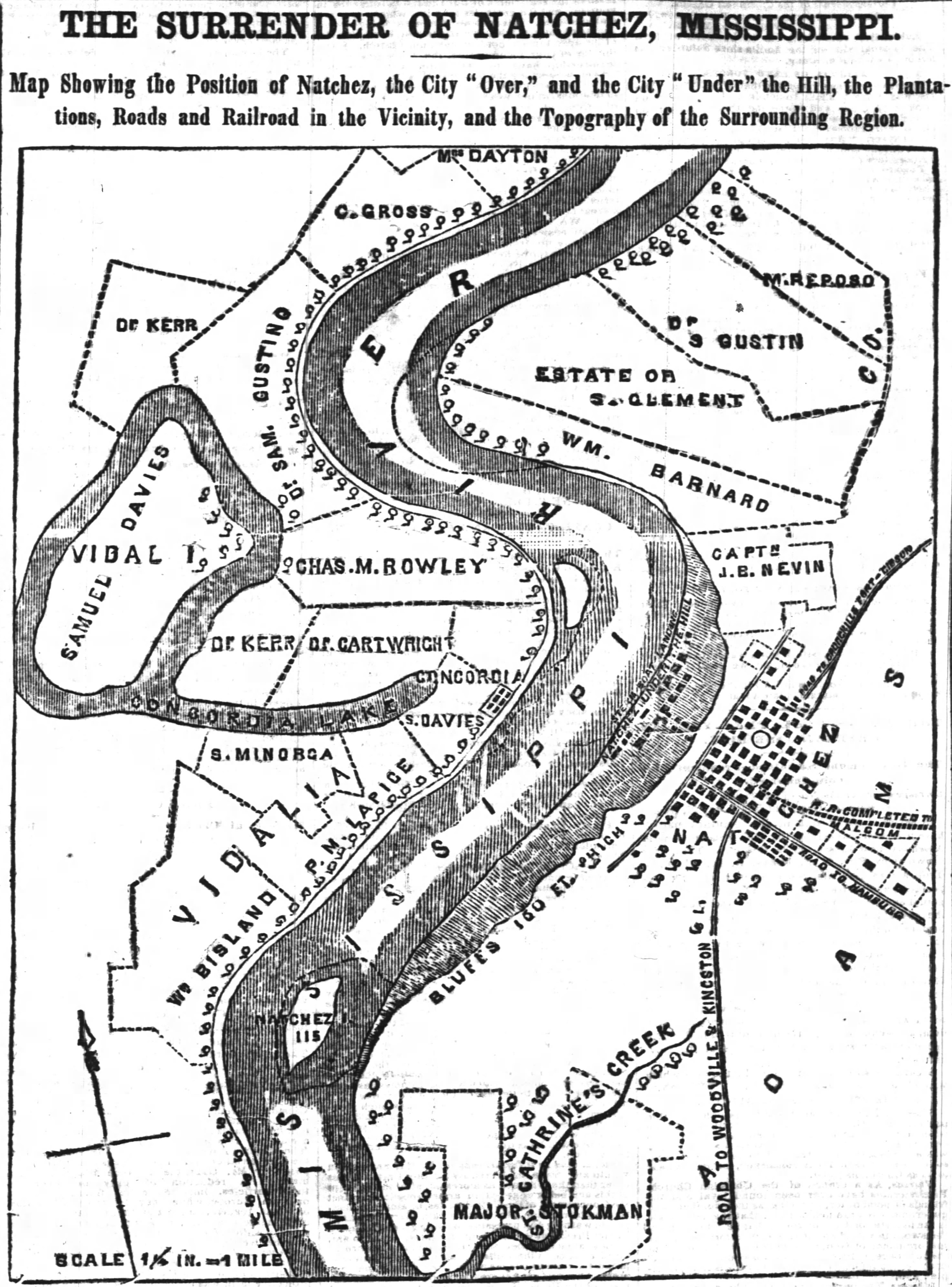
Map of Natchez published on the cover of the New York Times in May 1862

In 1860, Ballard died, and Boyd was appointed as the administrator of his estate. Natchez was a nest of Fire Eaters in the years immediately prior to the American Civil War, and Boyd must have been considered a leader of among them as he was appointed in February 1860 to represent Mississippi at a "Southern states-rights conference...but, since only Mississippi and South Carolina sent delegations to Atlanta, the meeting to discuss Southern grievances did not transpire." Additionally, during the same year eventful year, there was a push for U.S. President James Buchanan to nominate Boyd to fill the vacant seat on the United States Supreme Court following the passing of Associate Justice Peter V. Daniel.

In December 1860, multiple Mississippi counties were selecting delegates at Southern Rights Conventions to participate in a broader state convention, which ultimately ratified the Mississippi Secession Ordinance in January 1861. S. S. Boyd was elected from Adams County. Other proto-Confederate representatives elected around the same time included L. Q. C. Lamar of Lafayette County and A. P. Hill of Madison County. However, Boyd did not ultimately participate in the Mississippi secession convention.

In October 1862, "Boyd, S. S." appears on the muster roll of a Confederate militia as a member of Company B, "District Composing all North Side of Main Street" in Natchez. Natchez was occupied by the U.S. Army following Ulysses S. Grant's capture of Vicksburg on July 4, 1863. In 1864, Boyd was apparently a featured player in a cycle of hostage-and-ransom-taking between enemies; after the Confederates forcibly relocated a family of eight Southern Unionist civilians, the U.S. Army charged Boyd $5,000 in 1864 to stay out of "Brookhaven.

"RETALIATION—A few days since, a squad of Rebels came to our lines under Flag of Truce having in custody Mr. J. Lengsfield with his wife and six children, who had been, as it appears after the usual routine of imprisonment and confiscation of goods, banished "not to return to the Confederate States during the war."

The family were properly cared for, and Gen. Brayman, in pursuance of instructions concerning such cases, selected Judge S. S. Boyd and family to be sent to Brookhaven in return. After all preparations were made for the departure, the friends of Judge Boyd proposed to pay five thousand dollars for the benefit and support of refugees and citizens who, like Mr. Lengsfield, may be plundered and banished from rebel neighborhoods for being loyal to the United States flag and Government. Gen. Brayman made the order accordingly.

The result is Judge Boyd remains at home, and the new Mayor begins his poor fund, for the winter, with five thousand dollars in the city treasury.

— The Daily True Delta, October 30, 1864

This story also appears in a footnote in Matilda Gresham's The Life of Walter Q. Gresham, with a comment that the news clipping was provided by Allen T. Bowie, and with a secondary note that "The claim of Judge Boyd's relatives and friends is that General Brayman appropriated the $5,000 to his own use. [Boyd's son-in-law] James Surget states that he paid the money in currency to General Brayman, and that it never went in the poor fund." Nonetheless, Boyd was readmitted to the Union in 1865; according to one history of Natchez, "'Planters who had not yet taken the amnesty oath hastened to do so now to regain control of their property. Past allegiances were quickly forgotten. 'Shields, Boyd, Metcalfs [sic] &c nearly all the other fireeaters have taken [the oath],' sniped the Unionist Frank Surget in June. 'In fact as is always the case the most rabid come forward first'".

=== Death, estate, descendants ===
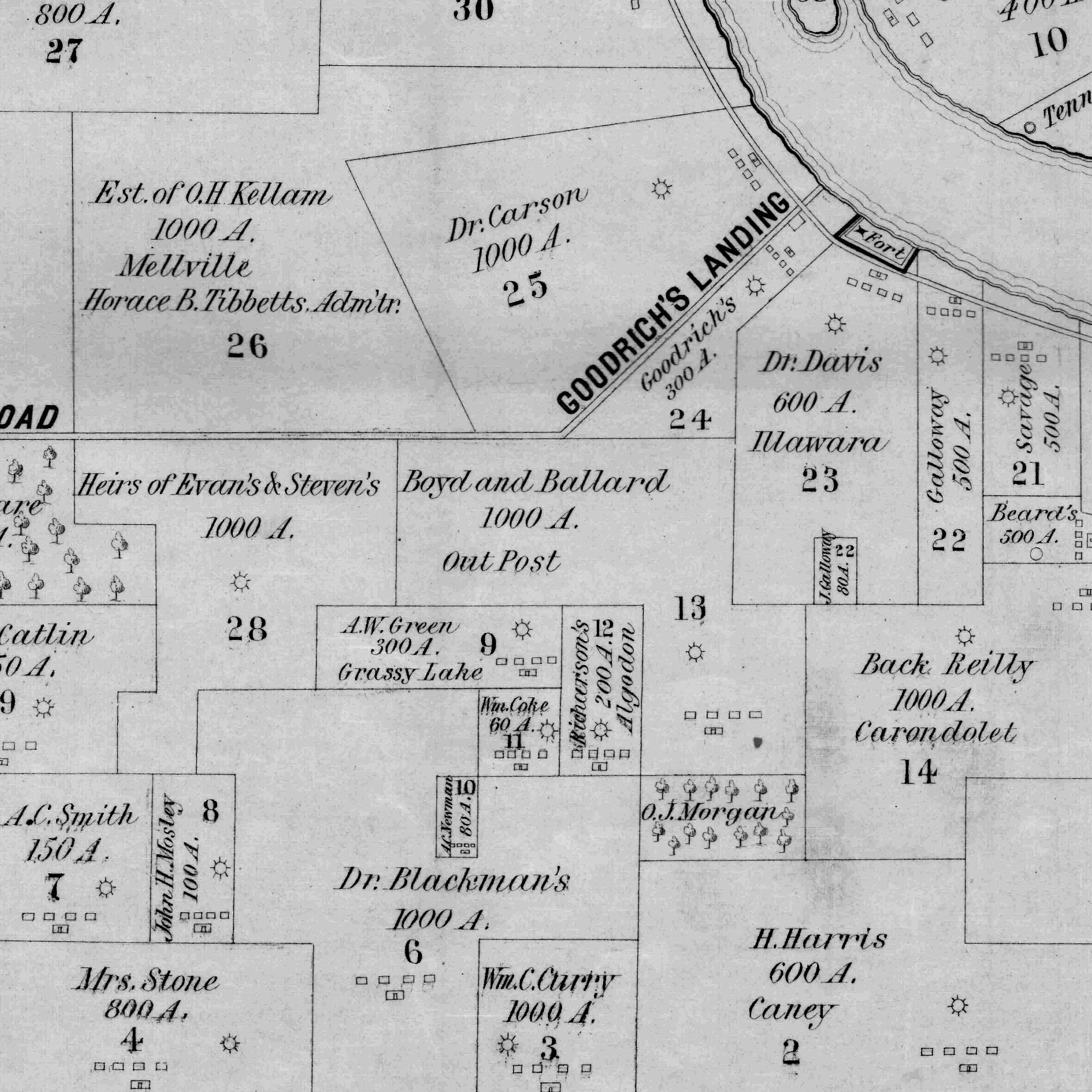
Boyd and Ballard's 1000-acre Outpost plantation near Goodrich's Landing had a residence, slave quarters, and a cotton gin; it was confiscated or abandoned after the American Civil War and offered for lease by the U.S. government as plantation number 13 in the Goodrich Division

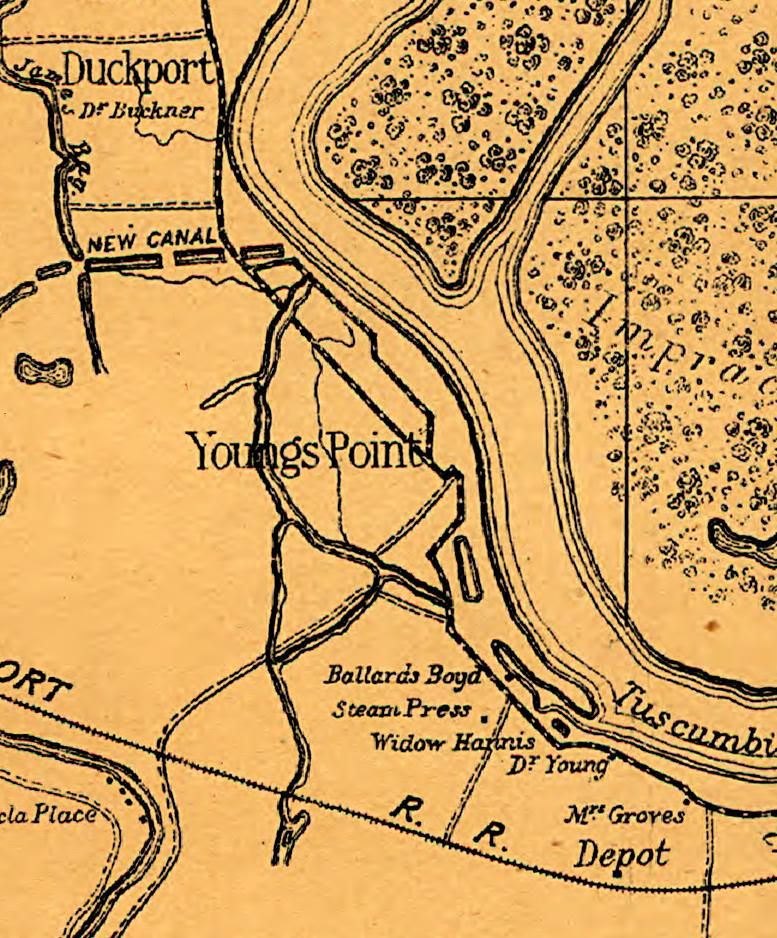
Ballard and Boyd plantation near Tuscumbia Bend below Young's Point

Boyd died at his residence near Natchez in June 1867. The local bar association offered their condolences upon hearing the news of his death. His library at Arlington reportedly housed "8,000 books published in twelve languages". An Aubusson carpet from the house was reportedly looted during the Reconstruction era. When probate was filed in December 1867, Boyd's legally acknowledged family was scattered between New Orleans, France, and England. (Note: Boyd's daughter Isabella, or Ysobel, married William Offley Forrester, a son of British wine merchant Joseph James Forrester, and lived out her days in the UK.) In 1907, a history reported that "Arlington, on the edge of the town, and approached by a winding avenue of water oaks, was the former home of Judge S. S. Boyd and famed for its paintings and fine old library; it is now owned by his daughter, Mrs. Wm. Benneville Rhodes." Arlington remained in the hands of Boyd's family until around 1913. In Harnett T. Kane's telling, "Years later Arlington was mortgaged, and there came a foreclosure of building and furnishings...it lost its owner but stayed intact, to the last terra cotta figure and final crystal pendant. For the bank it was only a big place best classified as an annoyance. Retainers boarded up windows, draped furniture in ghostlike hangings while the rats gnawed the Judge's books and oils cracked in their frames. When two visitors liked it, the bank was glad to get rid of Arlington. The owner died, the widow left, again the building stood empty; and tales rose once more of Jane White's spirit, gliding along the damp floors."

Among Boyd's surviving children was a man named James Boyd, born to one of the women whom Boyd had enslaved. In later life, James Boyd became a "plantation manager and a well-to-do entrepreneur." According to descendants, as reported in Florence Ridlon's A Black Physician's Struggle for Civil Rights: Edward C. Mazique, M.D:

The old judge was so fond of James' mother that his wife forced him to send her away to a property he owned up near Vicksburg. Although not treated as an equal to his half-sisters, James was given a favored position in the home. The complicated accommodations made to fit these black/white relationships stagger the imagination. The Boyds all sat in the dining room for meals. The servants had to wait on James too, but he didn't sit at the main table. Instead, he was at another little table near it. James Boyd lived with the family, after the judge died, until he was twenty-two years old. His half-sister, Catherine Boyd Suzette [sic], was so fond of him that she eventually hired him to manage her husband's estate at Suzette Ashley, a job he held when he met and married Mary Mazique. James Boyd held himself so aloof from everyone that even his wife, Mary, called him Mr. Boyd."

== Letters ==
In the 21st century, Boyd has gained notoriety through the preserved correspondence of his business partner, the Rice C. Ballard Papers held in the Wilson Special Collections Library at the University of North Carolina. Specifically, letters concerning Boyd's involvement with two enslaved women, Maria, and Virginia Boyd, have been extensively referenced in recent literature on American slavery. While Boyd is not explicitly named in either, the majority of historical analysis suggests that Boyd is the subject.

=== J. M. Duffield to Ballard, 29 May 1848, folder 127 & J. M. Duffield to Ballard, 5 August 1848, folder 131 ===
I desired, in the first place, to apprise you, that I had made arrangements to send the child northward, there to be brought up, and educated, and there forever to reside. I have made all my arrangements for her, and she will start on the 6th July. I shall be in Natchez, when she goes ....

The next was, to endeavor to do something for Maria. Her health seems to be sinking and she has been a sufferer of great agony mentally and bodily. You will recollect the cruelties which you described to me once in confidence that had been perpetrated, by a certain person in whose power Maria is [Judge Boyd], and I recollect the horror you expressed of it. All these cruelties have been inflicted upon the feeble frame of that girl—and are frequently inflicted—she must die under them. Long ago would I have freed her from them, if I had been able to do so ....

Will you not, Colonel, let me have her. She is sickly, suffering, and will die soon if she remains where she is. I buy her only to free her. Lashed as she is like an ox, until the blood gushes from her, I know, your kind, humane heart must revolt at the barbarities she is constantly enduring. I would do anything on earth to relieve her from her present position ....

Only listen to the dictates of your own kindly nature, and you will grant the request, which I make as a matter of favor to me, and goodness to her, and as another memorial of your generosity.

— J. M. Duffield to Ballard, 29 May 1848

There are two letters that refer to a woman named Maria, "lashed as she is like an ox, until the blood gushes from her". The letters, dating back to 1848, were written to Ballard by John Martin Duffield, a local attorney who had served as mayor of Natchez in 1843, and who was the editor of the Natchez Courier newspaper. Duffield likely had a past sexual relationship with Maria and was the father of Maria's child. He wrote to Ballard asking to buy Maria to save her from further abuse by Boyd. According to historian Yagyu, Duffield was "not able to pay cash for her initially, and he had to wait for a pending attorney fee to purchase her". Yagyu notes that "no matter how soon" Maria was released from Boyd's custody, she would have already been brutalized, resulting in long-term consequences. Edward E. Baptist surmises that Boyd had Maria "repeatedly flogged until she was maimed and sterile—all, it seems, for refusing his advances".

According to historian Sharony Green:

Duffield serves as further proof that white men of this generation acted inconsistently and deliberately in their efforts to enhance and protect certain enslaved individuals, specifically, women and children in whom they had earlier had sex and along the way invested some measure of emotion. Such investments were made while these men safeguarded their patriarchal and racial dominance. It is certain that Duffield had not planned to protect all enslaved people from abuse or see to it that all enslaved children be freed and educated. But he was concerned about two in particular.

Similarly, although Boyd seems to have been the perpetrator of the violence in the case of Maria, in another instance, he fired an overseer he deemed a "monster of cruelty," who was "going on at such a rate that Steele had to protect the negroes".

=== Virginia Boyd to Ballard, 6 May 1853, folder 191 ===
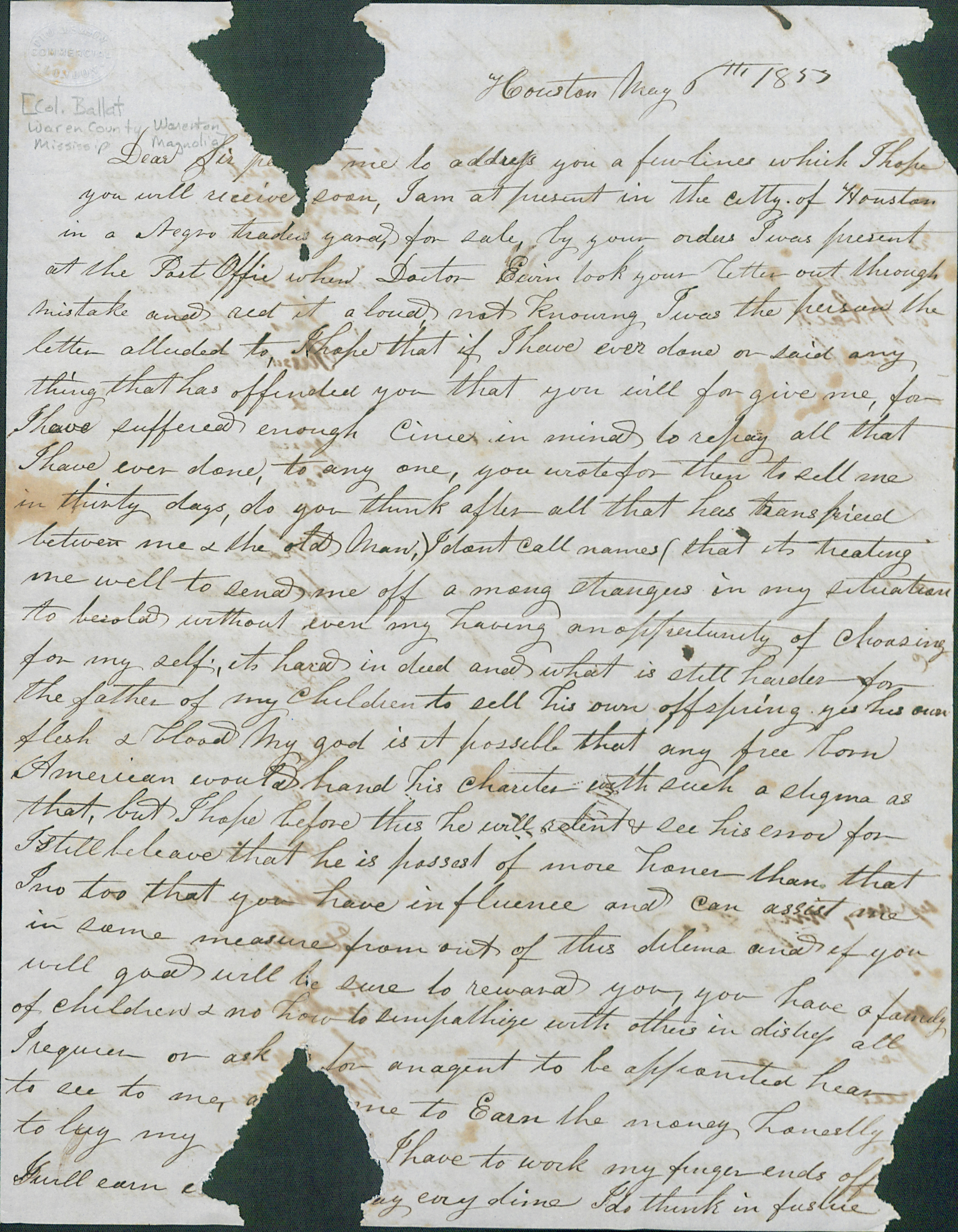
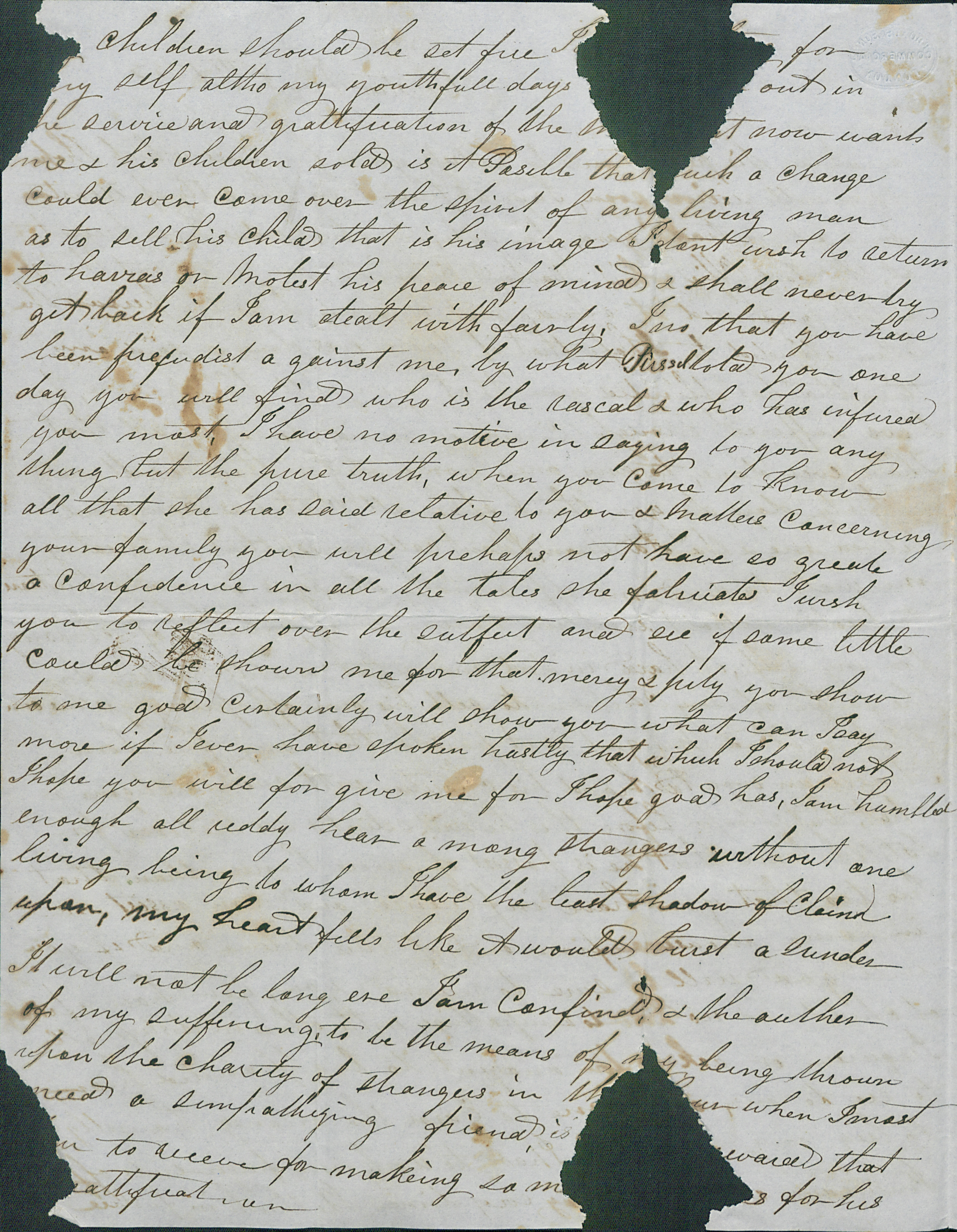
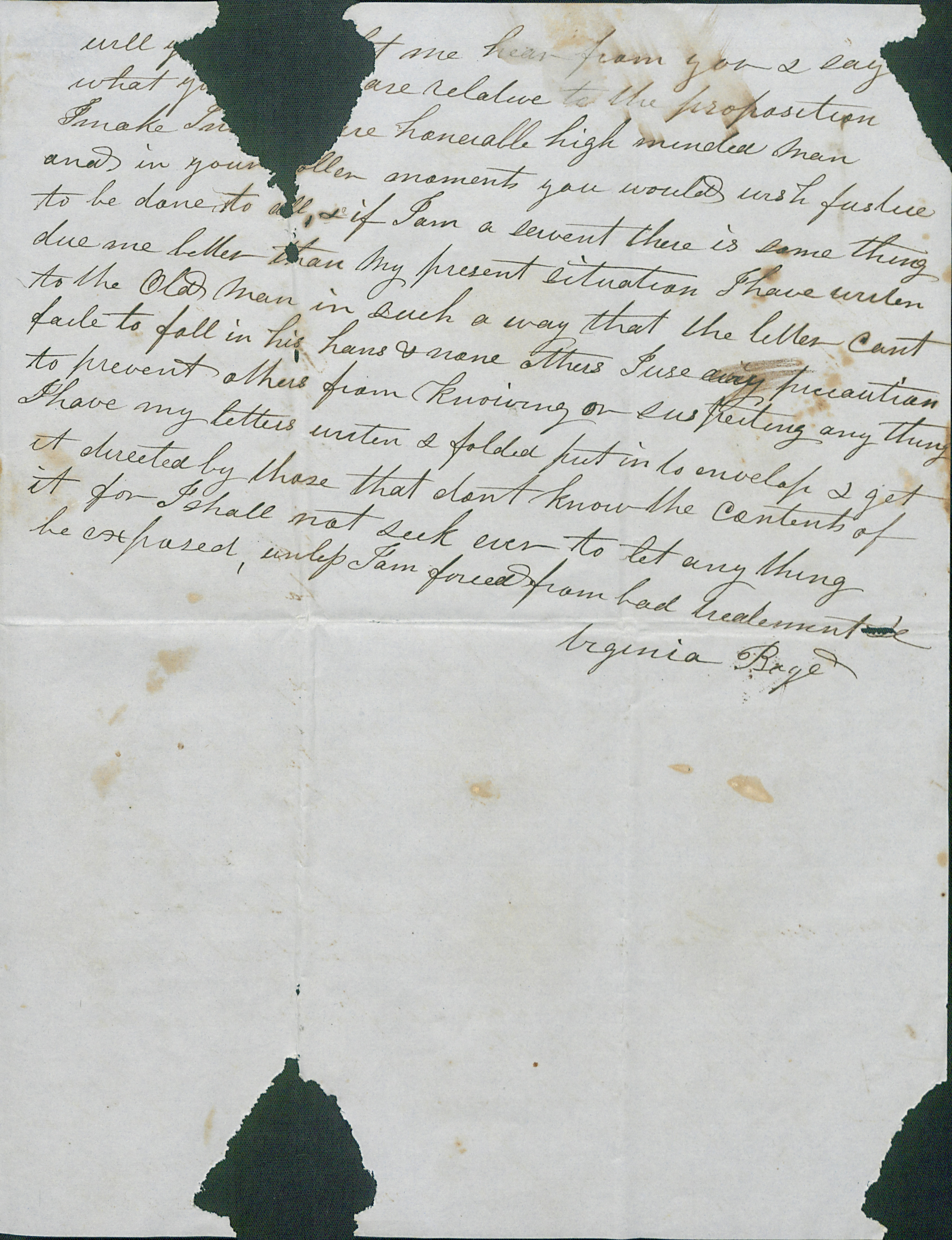
Virginia Boyd to Rice C. Ballard, 6 May 1853, folder 191 in the Rice C. Ballard Papers 4850, Southern Historical Collection, Wilson Library, University of North Carolina at Chapel Hill

Also among the letters is a remarkable missive from one Virginia Boyd. According to the collection finding aid at the University of North Carolina, on May 6, 1853, Virginia, who was pregnant, wrote to Ballard from a trafficker's yard in Texas, begging for his intervention and help to prevent her sale (folder 191). This letter is particularly poignant because of Virginia's condemnation of a man (apparently not Ballard; perhaps Boyd) who could sell his own children as well as their mother. A letter dated August 8, 1853, from C. M. Rutherford reported that Virginia Boyd and one of her children had been sold but that her oldest child had not (folder 196).

I am at present in the city of Houston in a Negro traders yard, for sale, by your orders. I was present at the Post Office when Doctor Ewing took your letter out through mistake and red it a loud, not knowing I was the person the letter alluded to. I hope that if I have ever done or said any thing that has offended you that you will for give me, for I have suffered enough Cince in mind to repay all that I have ever done, to anyone, you wrote for them to sell me in thrity days, do you think after all that has transpired between me & the old man, (I don't call names) that its treating me well to send me off among strangers in my situation to be sold without even my having an opportunity of choosing for my self; its hard indeed and what is still harder for the father of my children to sell his own offspring Yes his own flesh & blood. My God is it possible that any free born American would brand his character with such a stigma as that, but I hope before this he will relent & see his error for I still beleave that he is possest of more honer than that. I no too that you have influence and can assist me in some measure from out of this dilemma and if you will God will be sure to reward you, you have a family of children & no how to sympathize with others in distress ....

Is it possible that such a change could ever come over the spirit of any living man as to sell his child that is his image. I dont wish to return to harras or protest his peace of mind & shall never try [to] get back if I am dealt with fairly ....

I have written to the Old Man in such a way that the letter cant fail to fall in his hands and none others I use every precaution to prevent others from knowing or suspecting any thing I have my letters written & folded put into envelope & get it directed by those that dont know the Contents of it for I shall not seek ever to let any thing be exposed, unless I am forced from bad treatment &c

— Virginia Boyd to Ballard, 6 May 1853

Virginia Boyd was likely held near Natchez until the summer of 1852 when, due to some unknown consequence of her having been raped by Boyd, Ballard decided to relocate her to the Karnac plantation near Port Gibson. Boyd approved of the decision, expressing to Ballard that he did not wish "to be bothered by her, & if she will not behave, put her in the stocks until you send her off". Pregnant at the time, Virginia was subsequently sent to New Orleans and then further to Houston. The slave trader trusted to handle the sale eventually reported by letter that Virginia and her newborn child had been sold, as instructed by Ballard. Virginia's teenage daughter was also slated for sale, likely in Mississippi. Historian Baptist writes, "Boyd had created a problem. Ballard had solved it. If Virginia sent any more letters, they did not survive. Most likely, Virginia wilted and died in a Texas field."

Green comments that Virginia Boyd's letter "uncovers sexual relations that routinely happened, even if they were rarely discussed, between enslaved women and white men in the plantation South". Another scholar deems Virginia Boyd's letter "among the most revealing pieces of extant enslaved correspondence". It is notable for its disclosures, its rhetorical and emotional argumentation, and as correspondence from an enslaved person who was formerly a trusted "key slave" now writing "at the point of forced migration via sale, hire, or slaveholder relocation ... who had either fallen from favor and were endeavoring to save themselves from the market, or else were writing on behalf of others whose sale or hire they sought to prevent, or at least to shape in some way".

Sharony Green elsewhere commended Ballard for his contribution to the historiography of female slavery in the United States:

Though he enslaved hundreds, Ballard was also open to assisting others in ways we may never fully understand. The complexity of his personality is illustrated in how a woman managed a plantation in which he had invested money. Appointing women to management positions ran against the grain of nineteenth-century American gender roles .... Why Ballard kept Avenia's five letters and those from other black women we may never know. But we can be certain that, in keeping them, he has accommodated the modern reader and, in the end, himself. For though the work he engaged in was among the most reprehensible in pre–Civil War America and although his transparency in preserving such a detailed record of his life can hardly absolve him of that moral taint, historians owe him a debt of gratitude.

== See also ==
- History of Natchez, Mississippi
- Forks of the Road slave market
- Slave trade in the United States
- Colonel (U.S. honorary title)
- List of justices of the Supreme Court of Mississippi ("Judge Boyd" does not appear)
- Honorifics in the antebellum U.S. South
- Maria Perkins letter
- Samuel Clement, wife's cousin

== Sources ==
=== Books ===
- Baptist, Edward E. (2014). The Half Has Never Been Told: Slavery and the Making of American Capitalism. New York: Basic Books. ISBN 9780465044702. LCCN 2014012546.
- Claiborne, John Francis Hamtramck (1880). Mississippi, as a Province, Territory, and State: with Biographical Notices of Eminent Citizens. Jackson, Miss.: Power & Barksdale. LCCN 00002482. OCLC 2108221. OL 24156390M.
- Cleaveland, Nehemiah (1882). Packard, A. Spring (ed.). History of Bowdoin College: With Biographical Sketches of Its Graduates, from 1806 to 1879, Inclusive. Boston: J. R. Osgood & Co.
- Davis, Reuben (1889). Recollections of Mississippi and Mississippians. Boston: Houghton, Mifflin and company. hdl:2027/uc1.$b727504.
- Green, Sharony (2015). Remember Me to Miss Louisa: Hidden Black-White Intimacies in Antebellum America. DeKalb, Ill.: Northern Illinois University Press. ISBN 9781501756603. OCLC 931900715.
- Gresham, Matilda McGrain (1919). Life of Walter Quintin Gresham, 1832–1895. Chicago: Rand, McNally & Co. hdl:2027/loc.ark:/13960/t6445tb87. LCCN 20003856. OCLC 1513395.
- James, D. Clayton (1993) [1968]. Antebellum Natchez. Baton Rouge, Louisiana: Louisiana State University Press. ISBN 978-0-8071-1860-3. LCCN 68028496.
- Kane, Harnett T. (1947). Natchez on the Mississippi. New York: William Morrow. LCCN 47011784. OCLC 1404534.
- Lynch, J. D. (1881). The Bench and Bar of Mississippi. New York: E.J. Hale & Son.
- Prentiss, G. Lewis (1856). A memoir of S. S. Prentiss, ed. by his brother. Vol. II. New York: Charles Scribner. hdl:2027/ien.35556010314839.
- Ridlon, Florence (2005). A Black Physician's Struggle for Civil Rights: Edward C. Mazique, M.D. Albuquerque: University of New Mexico Press. ISBN 978-0-8263-3340-7. OCLC 318826408. OL 24801227M.
- Rothman, Joshua D. (2021). The Ledger and the Chain: How Domestic Slave Traders Shaped America. Basic Books. ISBN 9781541616592. LCCN 2020038845.
- Rowland, Dunbar, ed. (1907a). Encyclopedia of Mississippi History; Comprising Sketches of Counties, Towns, Events, Institutions and Persons. Vol. 1. Southern Historical Publishing Association. Madison, Wis.: Selwyn A. Brant. hdl:2027/nyp.33433081846085.
- Rowland, Dunbar, ed. (1907b). Encyclopedia of Mississippi History; Comprising Sketches of Counties, Towns, Events, Institutions and Persons. Vol. 2. Southern Historical Publishing Association. Madison, Wis.: Selwyn A. Brant. hdl:2027/nyp.33433081846465.
- Wayne, Michael (1983). The Reshaping of Plantation Society: The Natchez District, 1860–1880. Baton Rouge: Louisiana State University Press. ISBN 978-0-8071-1050-8.
- Yagyu, Tomoko (2006). Slave Traders and Planters in the Expanding South: Entrepreneurial Strategies, Business Networks, and Western Migration in the Atlantic World, 1787–1859 (PDF) (Thesis). University of North Carolina, Chapel Hill.

=== Genealogies ===
- Browning, Charles Henry (1891) [1882]. "Pedigree XXXV". Americans of Royal Descent: A Collection of Genealogies of American Families Whose Lineage is Traced to the Legitimate Issue of Kings (2nd ed.). Philadelphia: Porter & Costes.
- Chapman, L. Bond (1907). Monograph on the Southgate family of Scarborough, Maine, their ancestors and descendants. Portland, Maine: Hubbard W. Bryant, Bookseller and Publisher.

=== Articles, chapters, reports ===
- Baptist, Edward E. (2005). ""Cuffy," "Fancy Maids," and "One-Eyed Men": Rape, Commodification, and the Domestic Slave Trade in the United States". In Johnson, Walter (ed.). The Chattel Principle: Internal Slave Trades in the Americas. Yale University Press. pp. 165–191. doi:10.12987/yale/9780300103557.003.0008. ISBN 978-0-300-10355-7.
- Davis, Ronald L. F. (April 1993). The Black Experience in Natchez, 1720–1880 (Report). Special History Study. Natchez National Historical Park, U.S. National Park Service – via Internet Archive.
- Frank, John P. (March 1941). "The Appointment of Supreme Court Justices: Prestige, Principles and Politics". Wisconsin Law Review: 172–210. 1856 – via Articles by Maurer Faculty.
- Goleman, Michael J. (2010). Your heritage will still remain: southern identity formation in Mississippi from the sectional conflict through the lost cause (Thesis). Mississippi State University. 5042.
- Green, Sharony (2011). ""Mr Ballard, I am compelled to write again": Beyond Bedrooms and Brothels, a Fancy Girl Speaks". Black Women, Gender + Families. 5 (1). University of Illinois Press: 17–40. doi:10.5406/blacwomegendfami.5.1.0017. JSTOR 10.5406/blacwomegendfami.5.1.0017. S2CID 143768520.
- Schiller, Ben (2016). "15. Dueling Epistles: Enslaved Letter-Writers and the Discourse of (Dis)Honor". The Edinburgh Companion to Nineteenth-Century American Letters and Letter-Writing. Edinburgh University Press. pp. 245–257. doi:10.1515/9780748692934-017. ISBN 978-0-7486-9293-4.
- Smith, Lee Davis (2004). A settlement of great consequence: the development of the Natchez District, 1763-1860 (Thesis). LSU Master's Theses. 2133.
- Smith, Timothy B. (2014). "Appendix 1. Roster of Delegates to the Mississippi Secession Convention". The Mississippi Secession Convention: Delegates and Deliberations in Politics and War, 1861-1865. Jackson, Miss.: University Press of Mississippi. pp. 193–221. ISBN 9781628460971. OCLC 922663748.
