= Arlington (Natchez, Mississippi) =

Historic house in Mississippi, United States

- U.S. National Register of Historic Places
- U.S. National Historic Landmark
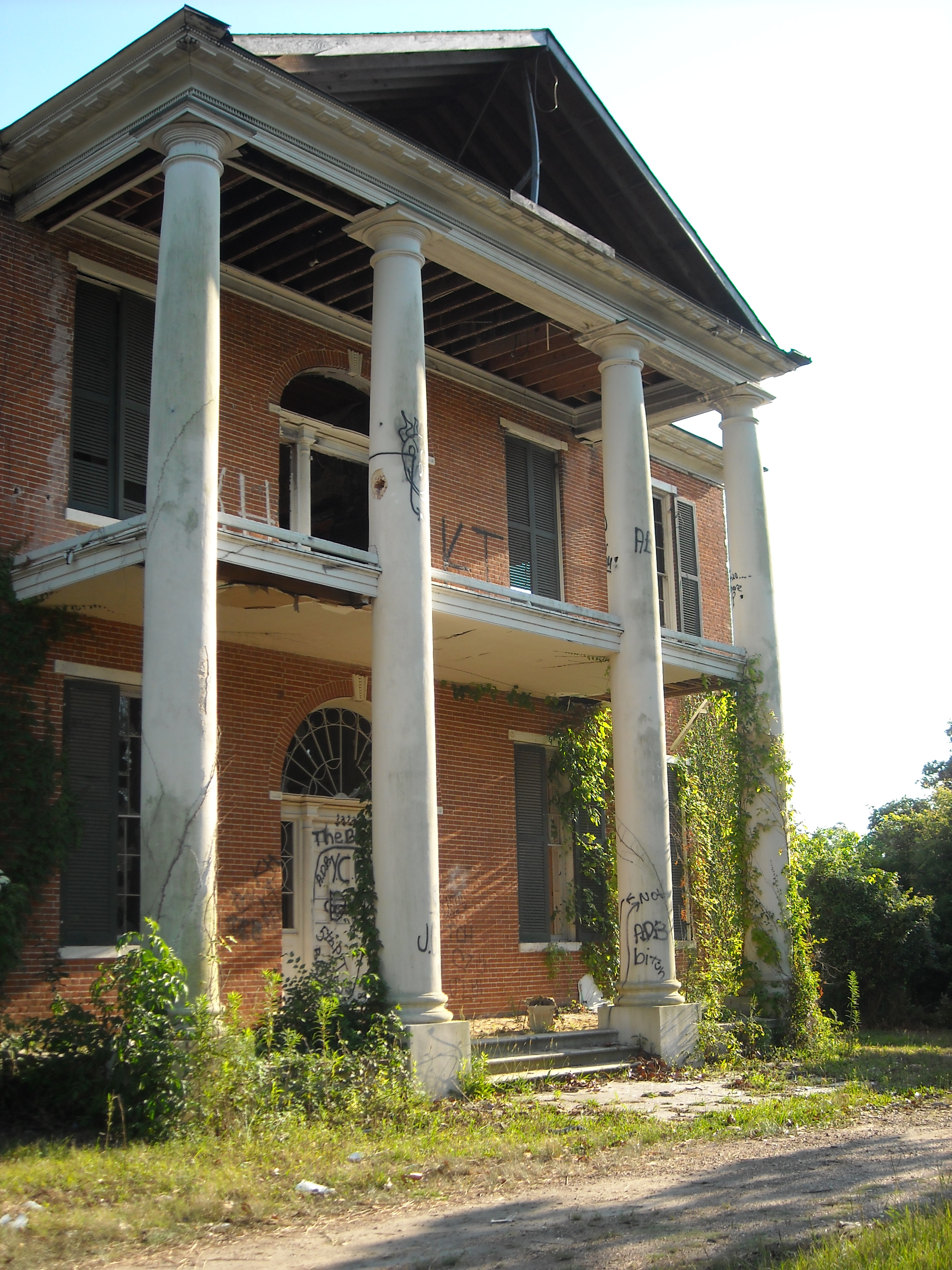
- Arlington in 2009

- Location within Mississippi Location within the United States
- Location: Main St., Natchez, Mississippi
- Coordinates: 31°33′10″N 91°23′33″W
- Area: 55 acres (22 ha)
- Built: 1819–20
- Architectural style: Colonial, Southern colonial
- NRHP reference No.: 73000999

Significant dates
- Added to NRHP: December 12, 1973
- Designated NHL: May 30, 1974

Arlington is a historic Federal style house and outbuildings in Natchez, Mississippi. The 55-acre (22 ha) property, which includes three contributing buildings, was listed on the National Register of Historic Places in 1973. It was further declared a National Historic Landmark in 1974. Following a fire that destroyed much of the main house, it was placed on Mississippi's 10 most endangered historic places for 2009 by the Mississippi Heritage Trust.

== History ==
The date that construction of the house began is murky. It is thought by scholars to have been built about 1819–20. Its design has historically been attributed to James Hampton White, but no documentation exists to validate the claim. What is documented is that Lewis Evans, a wealthy Natchez planter, purchased the land on which Arlington stands in 1806. Here he established a plantation and built a house. In 1814 he sold a portion of the plantation containing his house to Jonathan Thompson, a land speculator. Thompson then sold the Arlington property, including the house built by Evans, to Mrs. Jane Surget White in December 1818. Jane White was the daughter of Pierre Surget, a French emigrant at the head of one of Natchez's leading families. John Hampton White died on October 15, 1819, during a yellow fever epidemic. Jane White died on July 1, 1825. She found dead in her bed the morning after a ball to celebrate completion of the house. The cause of death is unknown but rumors and folklore range from stabbed to death to died of indigestion.

The house later came into possession of S. S. Boyd and his descendants.

Circa 1937, Arlington was admired by architectural historian Joe Frazer Smith and was owned by Mr. and Mrs. Hubert Barnum. According to a feature on the Natchez Trace Parkway project, at the time it was still "Set like a jewel in grounds laid out like an English park — with flaming azaleas in the fragrant gardens, ivy tumbling over the ancient eaves and clinging to the burnt-brick walls and neatly-clipped green hedges lining its flagstone walks Arlington has been little touched by the hand of time. It still retains its hand-carved rosewood stairway and much of its original furnishings—gold brocades, priceless silver services, paintings by Sully and Audubon and an unusually fine library."

A photo of Arlington appears in Eudora Welty's Notes on River Country.

== Architecture ==
Arlington has been considered by architectural historians to be "one of four important Federal Style villas which established the basic form for the later antebellum houses of Natchez." Situated atop a low natural hill, the red brick house is two full stories above a low basement. The exterior of the main block measures 64 by 87 feet (20 m × 27 m).

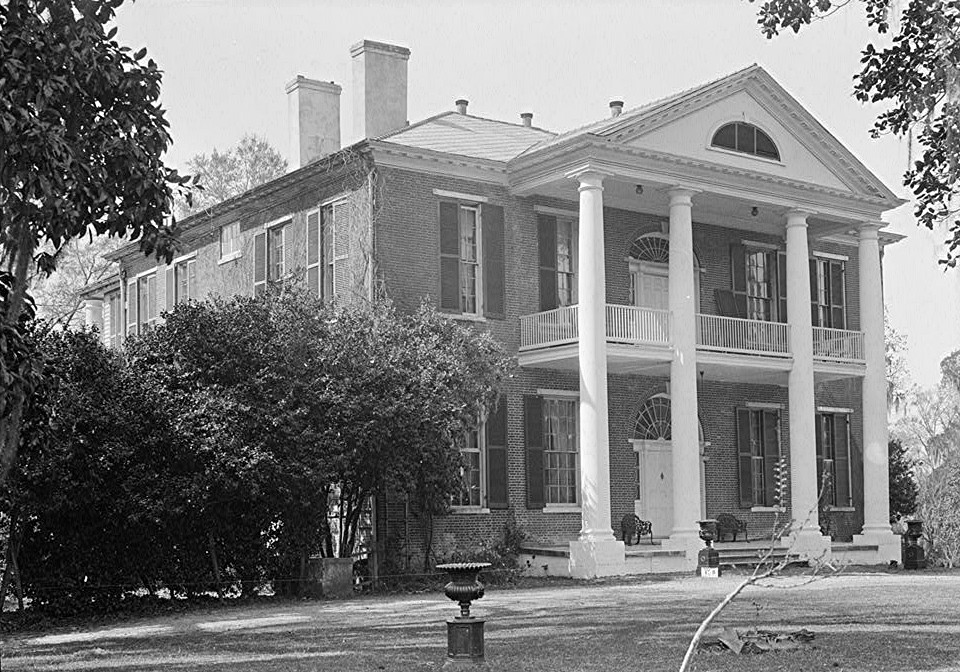
The front (north) and east elevations in 1934.

The front facade is five bays wide, with the three central bays fronted by a tetrastyle portico featuring four monumental Doric columns. The front doorways on both levels are trimmed with radiating brick voussoirs, with carved marble impost blocks and keystones. The openings are each filled by two sidelights with decorative muntins, and a fanlight around a central door. All of the window openings are enhanced with carved marble sills and lintels.

The interior is divided on both main levels using a central hall plan, with two rooms to each side. The east side features a stair-hall, with a fanlight-topped doorway connecting it to the main hall. The Federal style woodwork of the interior is refined. Of special note are the carved overdoor panels.

Service wings lie to the rear of the main house. At the southeastern corner of the main house is an attached one-story brick wing. It is fronted by a porch with slender, turned columns. At right angles to the one-story wing is a detached, two-story, brick outbuilding. It served as the kitchen and cook's quarters. Attached to the rear wall of this outbuilding is a one-story, brick carriage house. A two-story barn is situated about 150 feet (46 m) west of the rear courtyard, separated by a geometric boxwood garden.

During the mid-19th century, a full-width monumental portico was added to the rear. It features Doric columns matching those at the front and Greek Revival woodwork underneath. At this time a cast iron porch was added over a central doorway to the stair-hall on the east side of the house and the attached wing was reworked.

== Fire and aftermath ==
Arlington suffered a disastrous fire on September 17, 2002, that destroyed the main roof and much of the second floor. A new roof was built through the efforts of the Historic Natchez Foundation shortly after the fire. Vandals subsequently broke many windows and destroyed or defaced much of the interior and exterior woodwork. Following a lawsuit filed by the Natchez Preservation Commission, the absentee owner was fined on December 2, 2009, in the municipal court of Natchez after being convicted of demolition by neglect.

== See also ==
- List of National Historic Landmarks in Mississippi
- National Register of Historic Places listings in Adams County, Mississippi
- Samuel S. Boyd, 19th-century resident of Arlington
