= Word by Word =

2013 historical book

- Original cover
- Author: Christopher Hager
- Subject: United States Civil War history, African-American literary criticism
- Published: 2013 (Harvard University Press)
- Pages: 328
- ISBN: 978-0-674-05986-3

Word by Word: Emancipation and the Act of Writing is a 2013 historical book and analysis of a collection of writings by American slaves and befreed slaves. It was written by Christopher Hager and published by Harvard University Press.

== Reception ==
The book received the 2014 Frederick Douglass Book Prize from the Gilder Lehrman Center for the Study of Slavery, Resistance, and Abolition (Yale University).

== See also ==
- Maria Perkins letter

== Sources ==
- "2014 Frederick Douglass Book Prize – Trinity College Professor Wins the Sixteenth Annual Frederick Douglass Book Prize". Yale University Gilder Lehrman Center for the Study of Slavery, Resistance, and Abolition. n.d. Archived from the original on April 8, 2016.
- Bly, Antonio T. (2013). "Word by Word: Emancipation and the Act of Writing". African American Review. 46 (2/3): 546–547. doi:10.1353/afa.2013.0066. ISSN 1062-4783. S2CID 160573258.
- Davis, Thomas J. (2013). "Word by Word: Emancipation and the Act of Writing". Library Journal. 138 (4): 84. ISSN 0363-0277.
- Dean, Janet (June 2014). ""Uncle Tom's Cabin" and the Reading Revolution: Race, Literacy, Childhood, and Fiction, 1851-1911/Word by Word: Emancipation and the Act of Writing/Fever Reading: Affect and Reading Badly in the Early American Public Sphere...". American Literature. 86 (2): 397–400. doi:10.1215/00029831-2647054. ISSN 0002-9831.
- Fitzgerald, Michael W. (March 2014). "Word by Word: Emancipation and the Act of Writing". Journal of American History. 100 (4): 1212–1213. doi:10.1093/jahist/jau053. ISSN 0021-8723.
- Follett, Richard (July 4, 2013). "Word by Word: Emancipation and the Act of Writing: Books". Times Higher Education (2108): 52–53. ISSN 0049-3929. Archived from the original on March 9, 2016.
- Freeburg, Christopher (January 2015). "Chasing Slavery's Ghost". American Literary History. 27 (1): 102–113. doi:10.1093/alh/aju067. ISSN 0896-7148. S2CID 145773545.
- Green, T. T.1 (August 2013). "Word by word: emancipation and the act of writing". Choice: Current Reviews for Academic Libraries. 50 (12): 2228. ISSN 0009-4978.
- Newman, Judie (February 2014). "Word by Word: Emancipation and the Act of Writing". Journal of American Studies. 48 (1): 333–334. doi:10.1017/S0021875813002077. ISSN 1469-5154. S2CID 145526278.
- Sinha, Manisha (December 2013). "The Complicated Histories of Emancipation: State of the Field at 150". Reviews in American History. 41 (4): 665–671. doi:10.1353/rah.2013.0111. ISSN 0048-7511. S2CID 144754561. ProQuest 1470071724.
- Sternhell, Yael A. (November 2014). "Word by Word: Emancipation and the Act of Writing". Journal of Southern History. 80 (4): 997–998. ISSN 0022-4642.
- "WORD BY WORD Emancipation and the Act of Writing". Kirkus Reviews. 80 (23): 230. 2012. ISSN 1948-7428. Archived from the original on October 8, 2015.
- "Word by Word: Emancipation and the Act of Writing". Publishers Weekly. 259 (50): 51. December 10, 2012. ISSN 0000-0019.
- "American Literature". Reference & Research Book News. 28 (3): 174–177. June 2013. ISSN 0887-3763.
- Kevin Eagan, "Interview with Christopher Hager, Author of Word by Word: Emancipation and the Act of Writing", Critical Margins, August 14, 2013.
