= Maria Perkins letter =

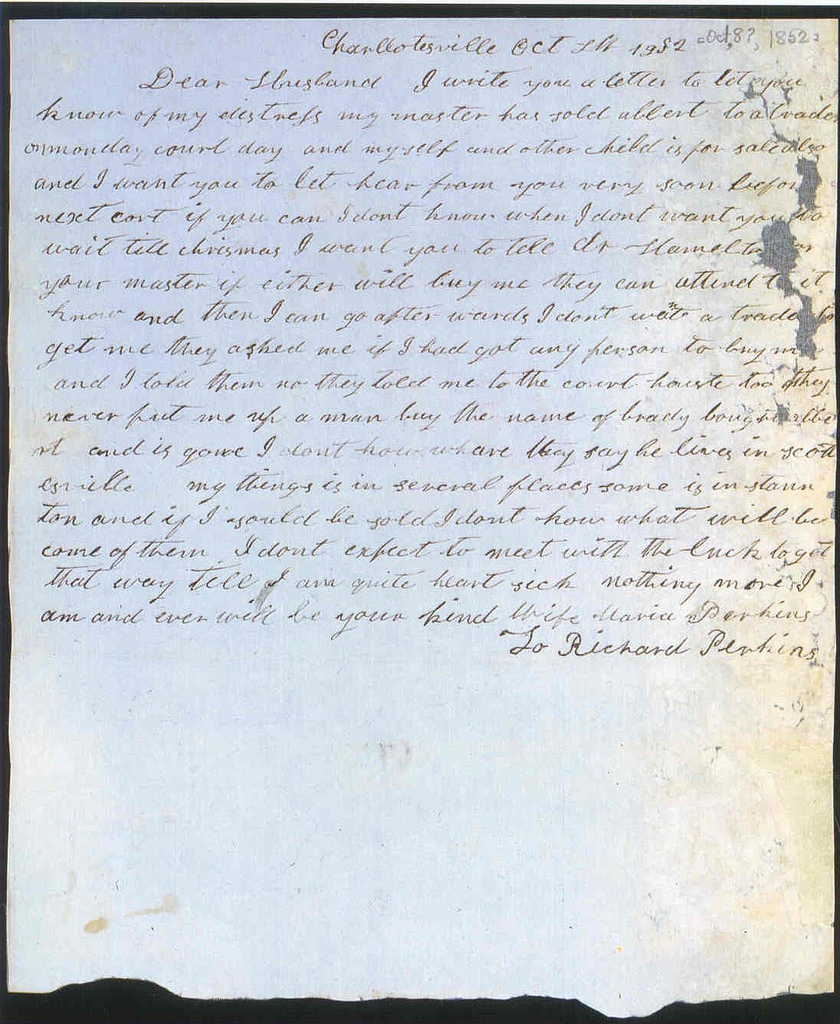
The letter by Maria Perkins, dated October 8, 1852

On October 8, 1852, Maria Perkins, an enslaved woman in Charlottesville, Virginia, United States, addressed a letter to her husband, also enslaved. In the letter, she shared the news that their son Albert had been sold to a trader, expressed fears that she too might be sold, and expressed her desire for her family to be reunited. Perkins was literate, something uncommon among slaves, and all that is known about her comes from this letter.

Ulrich Bonnell Phillips discovered the letter and published it in 1929. Christopher Hager, in his book Word by Word (2013), critically analyzes the document as a case study and suggests that it progresses from conventional correspondence to frantic diarying. Often cited as an example of slave writing, Perkins's letter is quoted by many textbooks in the United States to illustrate slaves' personal struggle, heartbreak, and strategic thinking.

== Background ==
The literacy rate among 19th-century slaves is estimated to have ranged from 5 to 20 percent. Though a substantial number of letters written by slaves have survived, accounts of African American life in the Antebellum period are more commonly studied through slave narratives written or dictated by former slaves. Few actively enslaved people were "free" enough to write to family members to warn that they might presently be traded. "It is seldom that the historian finds recorded the personal emotion of the victims of the internal slave trade," author Willie Lee Nichols Rose writes in reference to Maria Perkins's letter. Historian Christopher Hager calls the genre of works by people at the time of enslavement the "enslaved narrative".

Perkins's letter was rediscovered by Yale University historian Ulrich Bonnell Phillips, who published it in Life and Labor of the American South (originally 1929). Phillips most likely found the letter among thousands of documents in a farmhouse outside Greenville, Virginia. Phillips and his friend Herbert Kellar visited the house and bought the collection of about 25,000 documents from farmer George Armentrout. Prefacing Perkins's letter in Life and Labor, Phillips reflects on "a letter which lies before me in the slave's own writing," one of the few slave letters published in the book. He adds, "We cannot brush away this woman's tears."

== Maria Perkins ==
Maria Perkins was enslaved in Charlottesville, Virginia. The letter by her that begins, "My master has sold Albert to a trader," is the only surviving record of her life. In the letter, she writes that her son Albert has been taken away by a trader with the name Brady, perhaps to Scottsville or further. Maria thinks that she will be sold herself soon. The letter, which was dated October 8, 1852, was addressed from Charlottesville to Maria's husband Richard, who was enslaved by a different master. Fearing that the family may be further separated, Maria writes that she wants to try to reunite the family and suggests a possible method. However, slaves rarely had such control over their future. Perkins asks her husband to try to convince his owner, or one Dr. Hamilton, to buy her and an unidentified "other child."

According to historian David Brion Davis, Perkins was almost certainly one of the more than one million slaves who were sold from their original residences to the Old Southwest in the 1850s. Willie Lee Nichols Rose writes that Perkins "was naturally more alarmed at the prospect of being bought by a trader who might sell her far from home and family, than if he were a local person." The Perkins family's situation was, despite the letter, out of their control, author Walter Dean Myers wrote in 1992: "It is the dignity of the human reduced to the idea of thing. For this is what this woman has become. This is what her child has become. It is a situation that no kind treatment can assuage, a wound of the soul that will never heal."

== Interpretation ==
Transcript of letter

Charllotesville Oct 8th 1852

Dear Husband I write you a letter to let you
know of my distress my master has sold albert to a trader
onmonday court day and myself and other child is for sale also
and I want to you let hear from you very soon before
next cort if you can I dont know when I dont want you to
wait till chrismas I want you to tell dr Hamelton or
your master if either will buy me they can attend to it
know and then I can go after wards I dont wa^{n}t a trader to
get me they asked me if I had got any person to buy me
and I told them no they took me to the court houste too they
never put me up a man buy the name of brady bought albe
rt and is gone I dont kow whare they say he lives in scott
esville my things is in several places some is in staun
ton and if I should be sold I dont kow what will be
come of them I dont expect to meet with the luck to get
that way till I am quite heart sick nothing more I
am and ever will be your kind Wife Maria Perkins

To Richard Perkins

The second chapter of Hager's book Word by Word: Emancipation and the Act of Writing (2013) focuses on Perkins's letter—a commonly cited example of slave writing—as a case study. According to Hager, high-school textbooks on US history which quote the letter emphasize different themes. Some focus on the toll of her heartsickness, while others highlight her strategic suggestions to reunite her family. Hager finds that modern publications of the letter generally use just the first half, in which Perkins was apparently more "careful" in writing.

Hager notes that features of Perkins's penmanship, such as the use of ſ ("long s"), suggest that she was taught to write by an older person who was formally educated. Structurally, the letter's first ten lines explain what has happened and what Perkins wants to happen. Toward the start of the letter, Perkins apparently corrected some grammatical errors (e.g., adding the word on before Monday and adding the letter n in want) and seemed more "deliberate". As the letter continues, she appears to have sped up and neglected to dip her pen in ink, producing misspellings and suggesting heightened urgency. This is reflected in the letter's meaning; it moves from being a piece of correspondence to, as Hager writes, "a diaristic mode of private reflection."

The final clause of the letter (from "my things" to "heart sick") is difficult to parse and open to interpretation. Hager writes that it likely means, "By the time I get the opportunity to go to Staunton (if I ever do), I will have become quite heartsick." The "things" to which Perkins refers are not clearly articulated, Hager notes, and the word can encompass an array of meanings. Historian Dylan C. Penningroth suggests that "my things" refers literally to her belongings. The phrase "in several places", which refers to "my things", may also be read metaphorically to refer to Perkins's distance from her husband and separation from her children.
