= Mississippi Heritage Trust =

- Formation: 1992
- Headquarters: 140 North Sharpe Avenue; Cleveland, Mississippi
- Region served: Mississippi
- Executive Director: Lolly Barnes Rash
- Website: mississippiheritage.com

The Mississippi Heritage Trust (MHT) was established in 1992 as a non-profit preservation organization in the state of Mississippi. Its mission is to save and renew places meaningful to Mississippians and their history, which is accomplished by education, advocacy, and preservation. MHT is supported by private resources that include special funding events, membership fees, grants, and gifts. MHT is governed by a board of trustees, with day-to-day operation under the guidance of an executive director and staff located in Cleveland, Mississippi.

== Accomplishments ==
Beginning in 1999, a recurring accomplishment of the organization has been its annual list of the Ten Most Endangered Historic Places in Mississippi. The objective of the list is to raise awareness of the most threatened historic places in the state. Through this awareness effort, dozens of historic places have been restored and preserved in Mississippi. As an example, the King Edward Hotel in Jackson was on the Heritage Trust's first endangered list in 1999. Although vacant for more than 30 years, the King Edward was renovated and reopened in 2009 as the Hilton Garden Inn.

Mississippi Heritage Trust, in coordination with preservation partners, successfully lobbied the Mississippi Legislature to pass a preservation tax credit to stimulate private investments in restoration of historic properties. Concomitantly, MHT developed a historic preservation curriculum for use in Mississippi public schools to educate children about the value of preserving historic properties.

== Presentations ==
Periodically, the Heritage Trust presents awards to outstanding preservation projects from across Mississippi. In April 2012, Heritage Awards were presented during the Conference on Power of Preservation in Economic Development at Ocean Springs. Awards were given to "…demonstrate excellence in the preservation, rehabilitation, restoration, and interpretation of architectural and cultural heritage in Mississippi". Completed projects included restoration of railroad depots, rehabilitation of city halls, houses, and commercial buildings throughout the state, and restoration of a historic county courthouse in Raymond, Mississippi.
