= Title and rank in the antebellum U.S. South =

Traditional practice

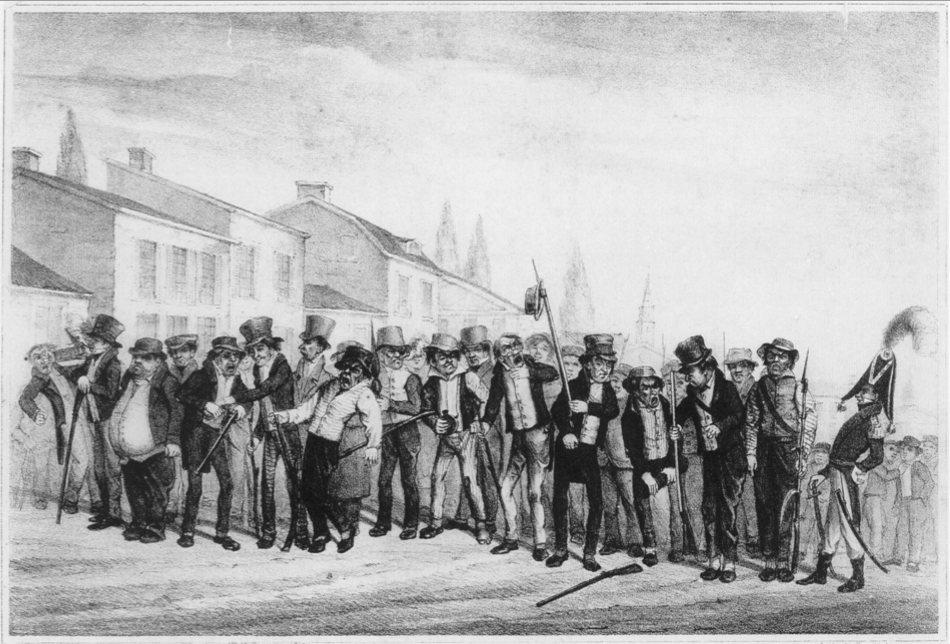
"Militia Muster" by David Claypoole Johnston (1828)

Granting rich White men honorific titles, often but not always derived from militia ranks (not to be confused with ranks in the regular U.S. Army or U.S. Navy), was an endemic practice of the Southern United States prior to the American Civil War. These titles were awarded (for the most part) by means of appointment or election to command of the locally organized, volunteer-managed regional unit of a nominally functioning state militia. As historian D. Clayton James wrote in 1968: "It would be difficult to find an antebellum newspaper reference to a Natchez nabob without a title such as 'Colonel' or 'Major.'" Bertram Wyatt-Brown wrote that it was common for ambitious antebellum southern lawyers to seek or grant themselves titles and emoluments: "The title of Major, Colonel, or best of all, General did wonders for reputation in that very hierarchical society." (For instance, lawyer and plantation owner Samuel S. Boyd seems to have acted a judge under special circumstances for exactly one case, and was ever after referred to as Judge Boyd; and while Arkansas planter Richard M. Gaines had no evident militia association, he was wealthy, influential, and a very distant cousin to general Edmund P. Gaines, so as a rule he was known as General Gaines, with the title added "as a courtesy".) In the telling of historian Thomas D. Clark, the South and frontier Midwest in the first half of the 19th century "was a place where a man with even a limited amount of ingenuity could create his own high rank," most often through participation in the local militia, "which drilled with regularity in the neighboring cornfields or down community roads or village streets. At the head of each of these companies marched at least three titled dignitaries who were resplendent in their brightly colored sashes and gaily plumed hats...There were enough feathered generals, bellowing majors, pompous colonels and swaggering captains to fill the woods."

Because of the provincialism and improvisational quality of the 19th-century American militia, it is a poorly studied topic in the history of the United States, but the gist is that these bodies were, on the whole, a "staggeringly inept force." The U.S. federal government had largely lost interest in local militia by the 1820s, which left a vacuum that was "staffed and ranked almost exclusively by upper-class elements, men who had the affluence, time, and social prestige to devote to 'soldiering'." Southern gentlemen used militia titles as a signifier of "rank in a society in which titles of nobility did not exist" and "social display of militia units, and their often costly uniforms and equipment, further emphasized that military rank belonged to those of standing who could afford to be warriors." Andrew Jackson, initially the elected general of the Tennessee militia before he was appointed a general officer of the U.S. Army, was garbed suitably for the War of 1812 by James K. Polk's future father-in-law Joel Childress, who gave Jackson a US$500 (equivalent to $8,795 in 2025) dress uniform that he had ordered from Philadelphia. When the Marquis de Lafayette visited Natchez, Mississippi in 1826, he was feted and honored with a parade including the Natchez Fencibles, whose plantation-elite officers wore "beautiful French blue uniforms, trimmed with silver lace, silver marble buttons" and were thus "the pride of their fellow-citizens."

Benjamin H. Latrobe wrote in his travel journal in 1796, "The multitude of colonels and majors with which I am surrounded bring back the nobles of the Polish republic to my recollection, whose power and respectability were much upon the same level. The only difference is that instead of Counts Borolabraski and Leschinski...we have here Colonel Tom and Colonel Dick and Major Billy and Colonel Ben and Captain Titmouse and General Rattlesnake and Brigadier-General Opossum." In 1857 a visitor from Manchester, England, traveling through the United States, wrote in a letter home, "By the bye, I forgot to tell you that by Western and Kentucky law I am a Colonel, because I have killed a rattlesnake." The grandiose titles titles titles of the U.S. South often confound later American historians, who sometimes cannot map them back to an obvious institutional source, be it militia, military, "courtesy," or rattlesnakes. One biographer of a Tennessee newspaper editor shrugged inline about his subject: "I do not know why he was called 'Colonel'."

== See also ==
- Colonel (U.S. honorary title)
- Brevet § United States

== Sources ==
- Clark, Thomas Dionysius (1939). The Rampaging Frontier: Manners and Humors of Pioneer Days in the South and the Middle West. Indianapolis & New York: The Bobbs-Merrill Company. LCCN 39010115. OCLC 2057074.
- James, D. Clayton (1993) [1968]. Antebellum Natchez. Baton Rouge, Louisiana: Louisiana State University Press. ISBN 978-0-8071-1860-3. LCCN 68028496. OCLC 28281641.
- Reinders, Robert (April 1977). "Militia and Public Order in Nineteenth-Century America". Journal of American Studies. 11 (1): 81–101. doi:10.1017/S0021875800003388. ISSN 0021-8758. JSTOR 27553270.
- Wyatt-Brown, Bertram (1997). "Andrew Jackson's Honor". Journal of the Early Republic. 17 (1): 1–36 [20]. doi:10.2307/3124641. ISSN 0275-1275. JSTOR 3124641.
