= Routhland =

Historic house in Mississippi, United States

- U.S. National Register of Historic Places
- Location within Mississippi
- Location: 131 Winchester road, Natchez, Mississippi
- Coordinates: 31°33′04″N 91°23′42″W
- Built: 1824
- NRHP reference No.: 77000782
- Added to NRHP: August 22, 1977

The Routhland is a historic mansion in Natchez, Mississippi. Construction began in 1815 in the Federal architectural style. It now has an Italianate style after extensive remodeling. The mansion has been listed on the National Register of Historic Places since August 22, 1977. It is located at 131 Winchester road in Natchez, Adams County, Mississippi.

== History ==
In 1790, 180 acres of land was granted by Francisco Luis Héctor de Carondelet to Job Routh. He built a mansion called Routhland in the 1790s, but it was burnt down in 1855. Another mansion called Routhland was built in its place for Job Routh's daughter, Mary Routh, and her husband, Charles G. Dahlgren, and it later was renamed Dunleith when purchased by planter Alfred Vidal Davis. Alfred Davis sold the property to Hiriam Baldwin in 1866 who died in 1866 and the property was sold to John R Stockton. The property was sold shortly thereafter to Joseph N Carpenter whose family held the property until 1976.

Meanwhile, Job Routh's son, John Routh, had become one of the largest cotton planters in the world. From 1815 to 1824, he built this Routhland mansion on his father's land. It is the only remaining mansion under the name of Routhland in Natchez. It was first built in the Federal architectural style. It was later remodelled in the Greek Revival style, and later in the Italianate style.

In 1871, it was purchased by Charles Clark, a Confederate veteran and former Governor of Mississippi from 1863 to 1865. Clark's descendants sold Routhland outside the family in 1946 to the Ratcliffe family, who saved and preserved it.

== Heritage significance ==
It has been listed on the National Register of Historic Places since August 22, 1977.
