= Routh family =

Wealthy American slave owners

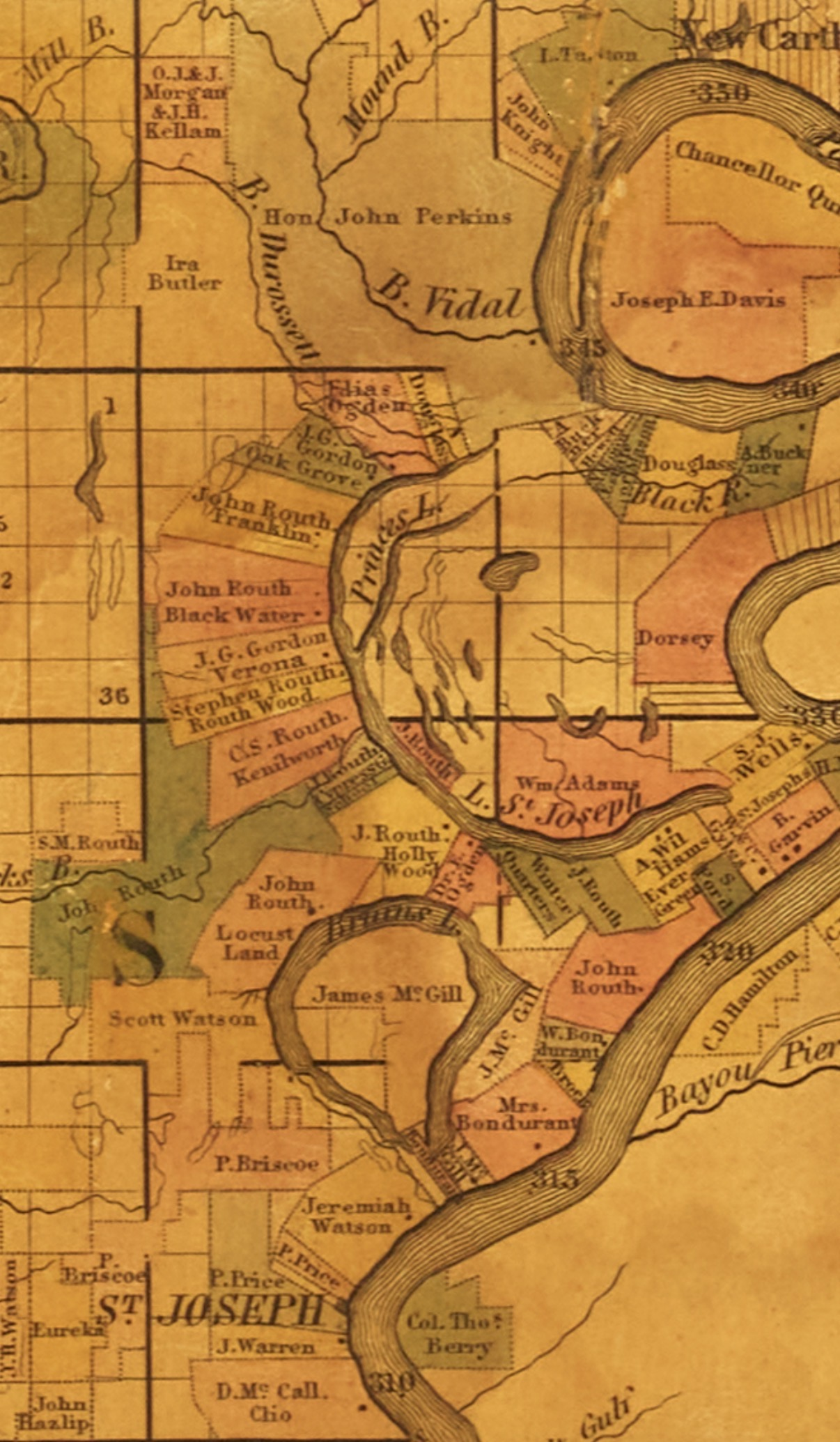
Routh plantations adjacent to Lake St. Joseph c. 1848

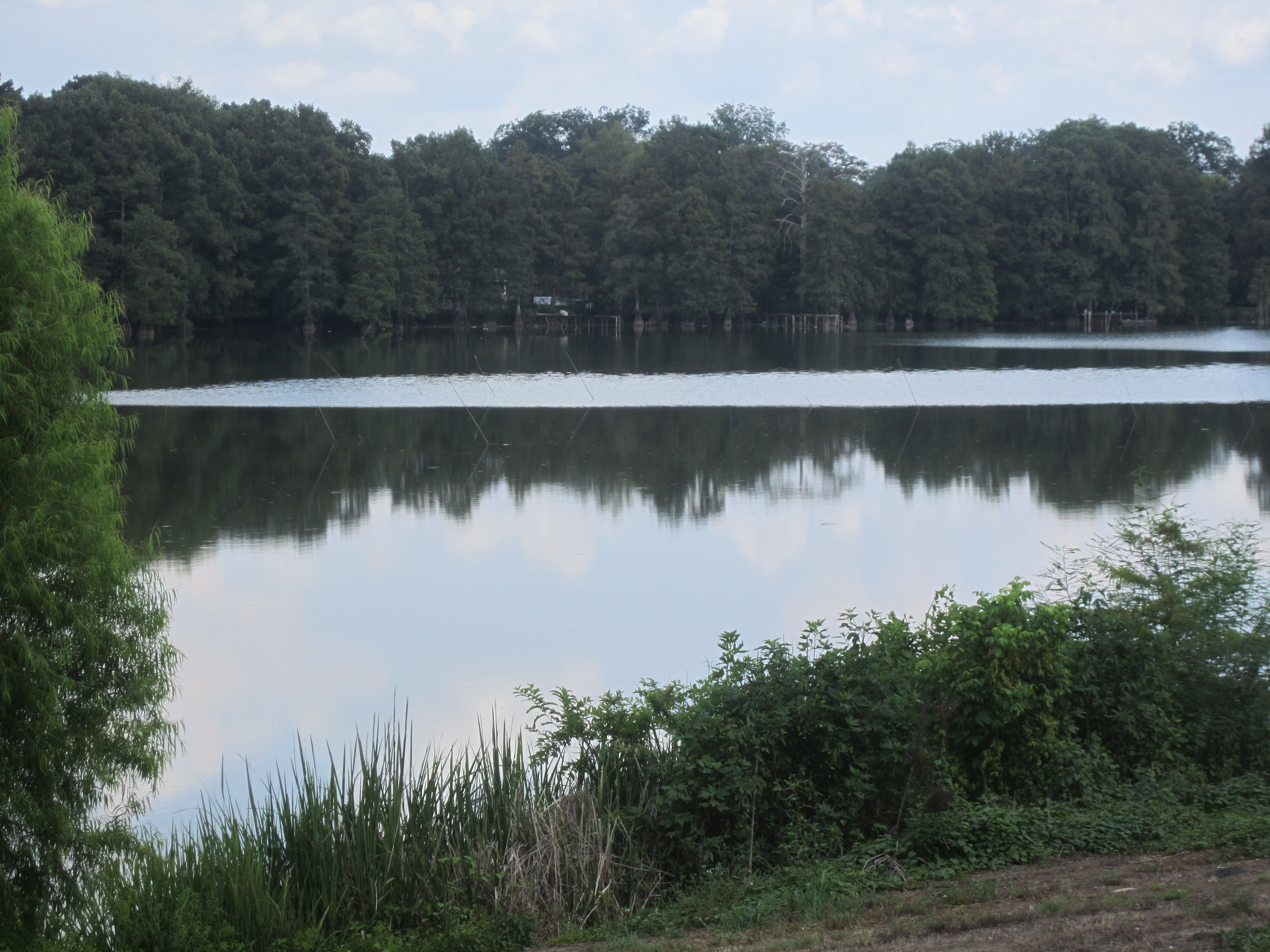
Lake St. Joseph near Newellton, Louisiana (2010)

The Routh family were early settlers of the Natchez District of British West Florida who managed to preserve and extend their wealth continuously through the American territorial period and into the period of Mississippi statehood, up until the American Civil War, an unusual feat of financial endurance otherwise only accomplished by the Surgets, Bingamans and the Minors. By the time of the 1860 U.S. federal census, the heirs of Jeremiah Routh, who had accumulated and monetized large land grants from the British and Spanish, collectively held one of the largest slaveholdings in the U.S. South, including at least 1,295 people enslaved in Tensas Parish, Louisiana.

These 1,295 people, legally held by four members of the Routh family, collectively produced "nearly 5,000 bales of cotton" in 1859, placing them in the top tier of cotton growers nationwide, which at that time was the single-most valuable agricultural product of the United States.

The family owned a number of grand homes around Natchez, Adams County, Mississippi, and before the war, the family owned at least a dozen plantations bordering Lake St. Joseph, an oxbow lake in Tensas Parish (roughly opposite the Claiborne and Jefferson counties of Mississippi, immediately north of Natchez), including properties of Routh grandsons-in-law Samuel Worthington Dorsey of Elk Ridge plantation and Haller Nutt of Winter Quarters and Evergreen Place plantations. In addition to Winter Quarters, the Routh fortune built the historic antebellum mansions Dunleith and Longwood.

== Jeremiah Routh ==
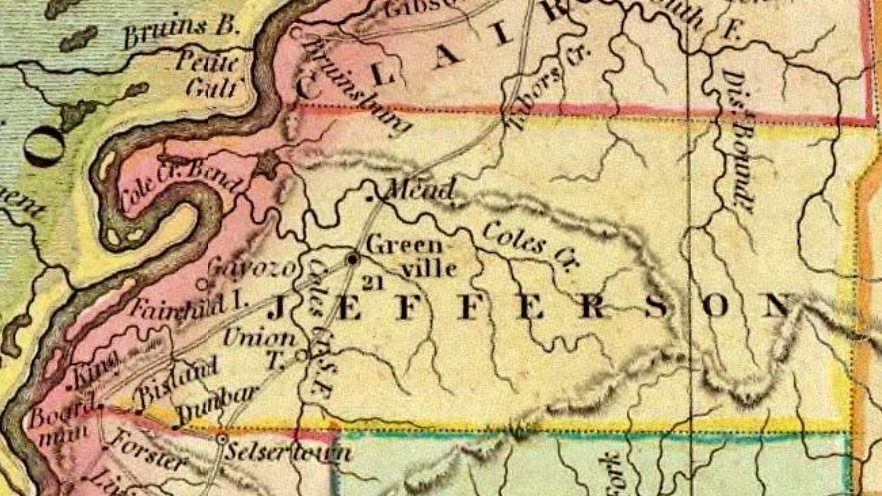
1823 map of Jefferson County, Mississippi, showing Cole's Creek forks

Jeremiah Routh (1740–1791) was from North Carolina and died in the Natchez District in 1791. According to one account he was granted 500 acres near Boyd's Creek in 1776. Other early settlers scattered through the countryside at that time included Anthony Hutchins, Richard Ellis and John Ellis, Bernard Lintot, William Marshall, John Turner, William Vousdan, and the sons of Rev. Jedediah Smith (Calvin Smith, Philander Smith), whose father had died within a week of landing in the Natchez.

Edith Wyatt Moore, a 20th-century Natchez booster and untrained local historian, retold a colorful version of the true story of Jeremiah Routh having hauled planed, finished lumber down the Mississippi River to Natchez via flatboat. Insufficiently moored at Natchez-under-the-Hill, the cargo-laden boat drifted away or was stolen by a "rascal" named John Olivary. Many years after the fact, and after the death of Jeremiah Routh, the Routh heirs received a court judgment compensating them for his lost lumber.

Jeremiah Routh Sr. and Margaret Matilda Routh had at least six children: Job Routh, Jeremiah Routh II, Mary Matilda Routh, Zaccheus Routh, Francis Routh, and Elijah Routh. There was a land grant made to one Zaccheus Routh in June 1779. The 1792 Spanish census of the Natchez District listed Elias Routh, Jeremias Routh, Job Routh, and Margaret Routh of Villa Gayoso, and Juan Routh (John Routh) of Bayou Pierre. "Routh's Old Place" was described in 1809 as being 550 acres on the north fork of Cole's Creek, three miles from Old Greenville and five or six miles from the Mississippi River.

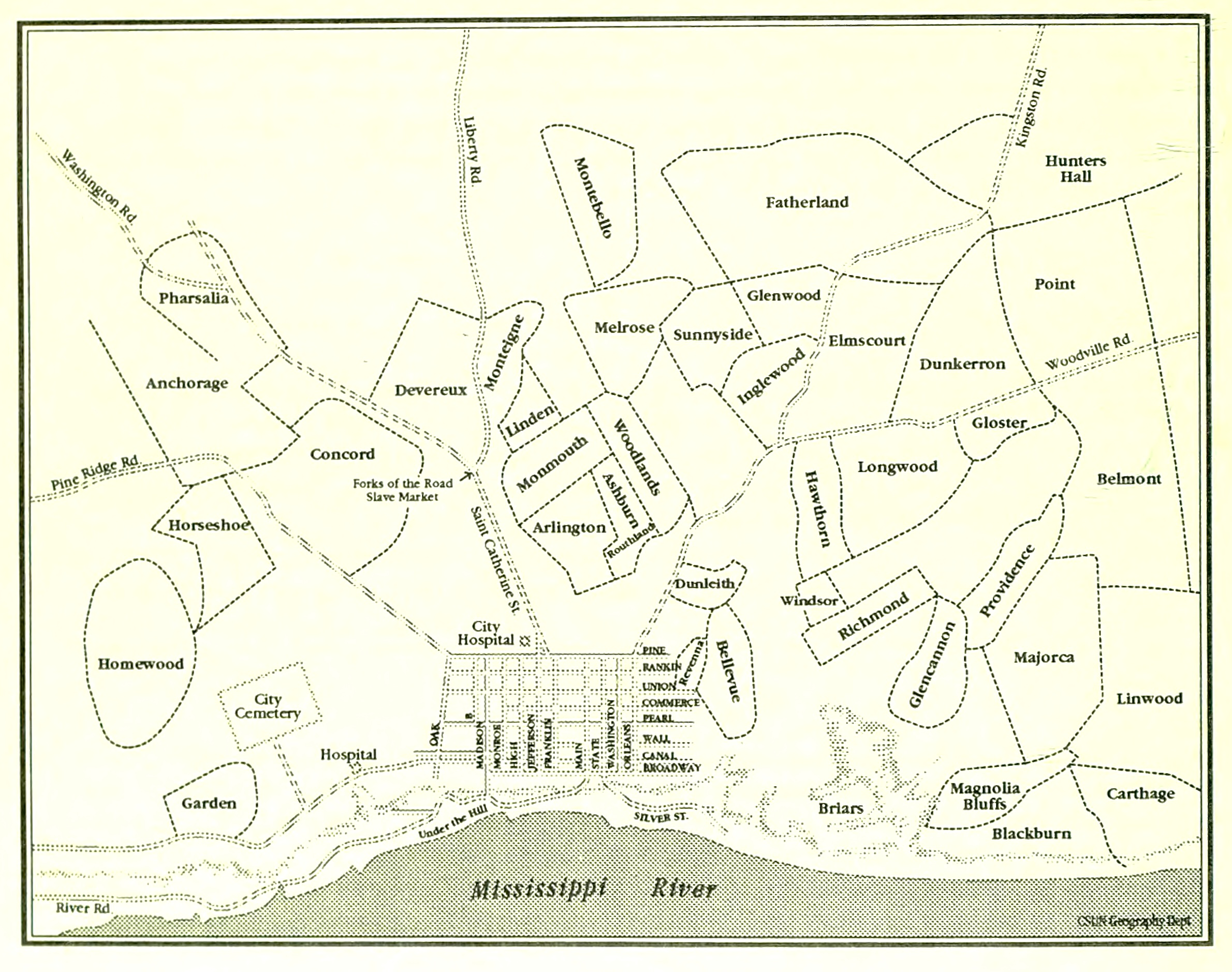
Suburban estates of Natchez, Mississippi (c. 1830–1860), including Dunleith and Routhland

== Job Routh ==
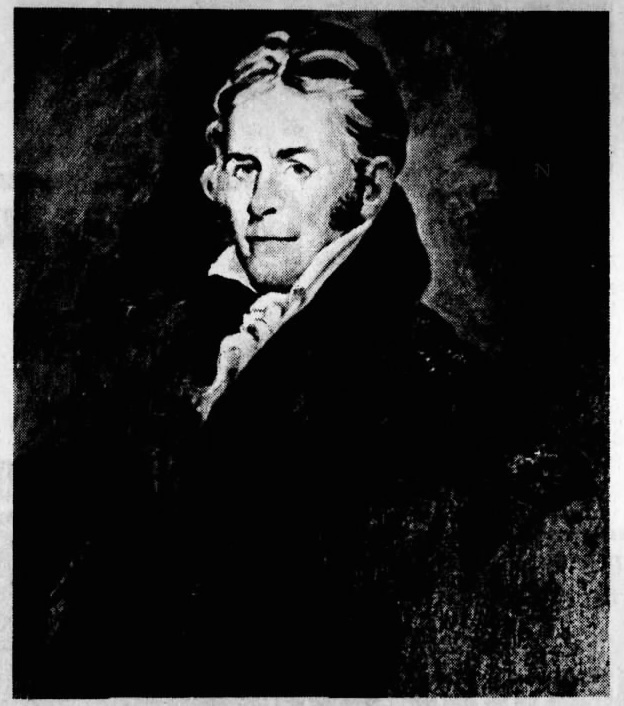
Job Routh of Mississippi and Louisiana (d. December 12, 1834)

Job Routh (1762–1834) was born around 1762 in Mecklenburg County, North Carolina. When he was eight years old, he reportedly almost drowned in the Potomac River and was saved by a family dog. In honor of this, Routh commissioned a cast iron sculpture of a Newfoundland dog for the family cemetery.

Routh came to Natchez from Kentucky in March of 1790. On September 7, 1792, he received a land grant of "a thousand arpents" at Natchez from Francisco Luis Héctor de Carondelet. The grant "covered a vast area, comprising the lands of some of our most noted mansions, such as Dunleith (formerly Routhlands) Richmond, Lanfollan, Arlington, Ashburn, Kenilworth, and Oakland, now known as Routhlands. Antedating these mansions by fully fifty years was the first Routhland (Dunleith) and Hope Villa. Job Routh became one of our earliest nabobs and not only gave his children lordly estates, but willed them slaves and cattle."

Job Routh became one of the largest landowners and slaveholders in the antebellum South. An early settler in Concordia Parish testified in a lawsuit over a ferry franchise that around 1801 there was a ferry between Natchez and the Spanish colonial "Post of Concordia" (later Vidalia), "used principally for crossing stock by Job and Jeremiah Routh, but I think it was for their own private use." Job Routh was granted a tract in what is now Tensas Parish in 1803, in vicinity of three oxbow lakes that were former bends in the Mississippi River: Lake Bruin, Lake St. Joseph, and Yucatan Lake. According to a 20th-century account, Job Routh also "obtained a large grant of land across the River in Louisiana near Lake St. Joseph, and there he and his children cultivated 20,000 acres with 5,000 slaves as labor. Part of the year they lived in their town houses in Natchez, and the rest of the time on the plantations on Lake St. Joseph. There were fifteen homesteads belonging to the Routh family in Tensas Parish, Louisiana, where life was one long series of balls, dinners, picnics, horse races, and boat races. Just prior to the outbreak of the War between the States John Routh, a son of Job Routh, made a cotton crop of 8,840 bales in one year." Another account has it that his Louisiana property stretched from Newellton to Hard Times plantation.

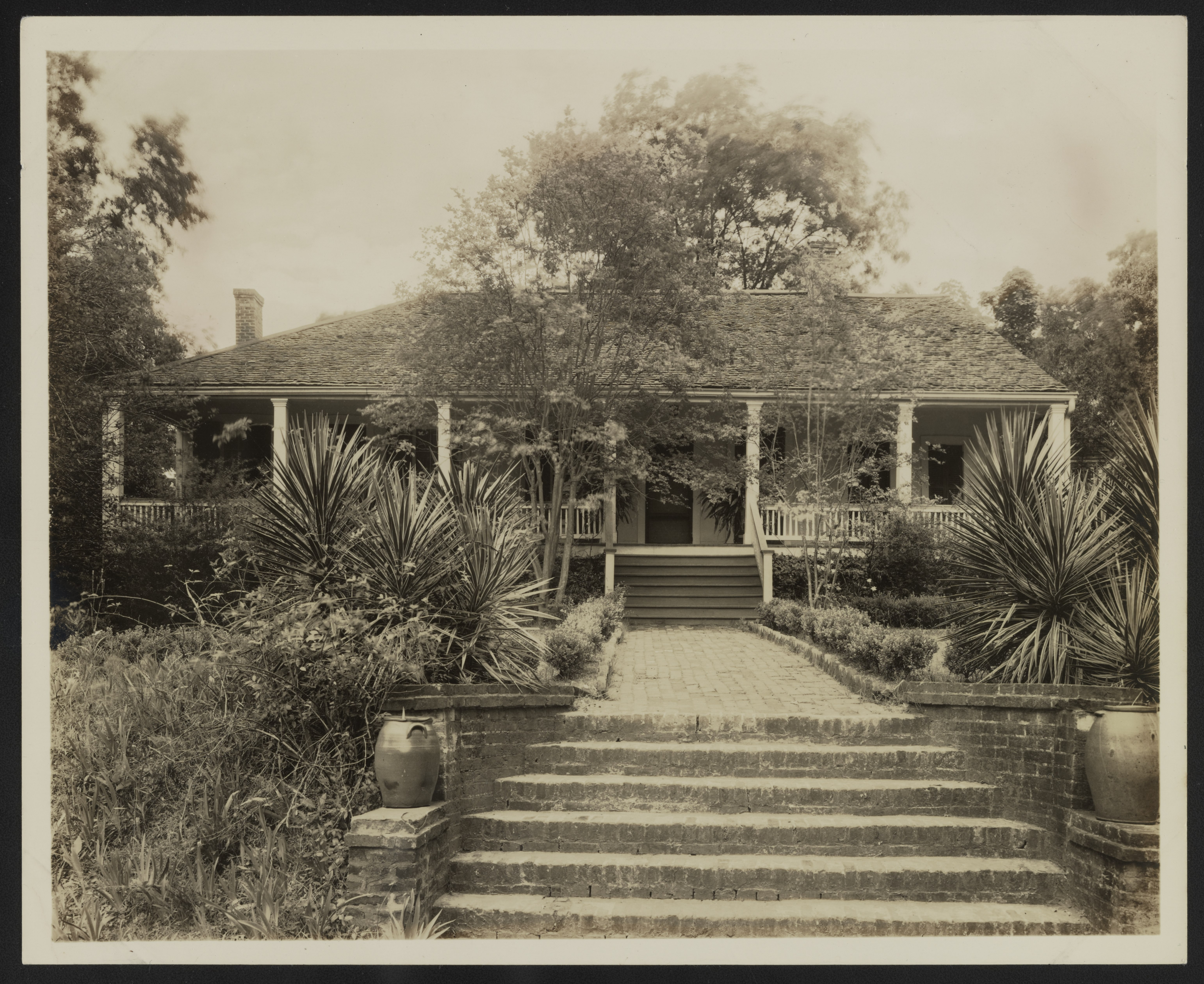
Hope Farm in Natchez, the oldest part of the building dates to 1789

In the 1790s, he constructed a mansion called Routhland. This mansion was described as one of "Natchez's grander structures, with two stories and galleries on at least two sides. The setting was a 1700-acre estate near the southern edge of the city." The first recorded burial at Routh Cemetery adjacent to Dunleith on Homochitto Street in Natchez dates to 1818; there are a total of 46 known burials in the cemetery, including three formerly enslaved people.

In 1805, Routh established a residence at a place he called Winter Quarters in Tensas Parish, Louisiana. The plantation was so-named because the residents lived elsewhere during most of the year but came south for the winter. The house at Winter Quarters was originally a three-room hunting retreat built out of logs felled and hand-hewn on site by the enslaved community on the property, and eventually expanded to 19 rooms, five of which were added in the 1820s by the Ogdens.

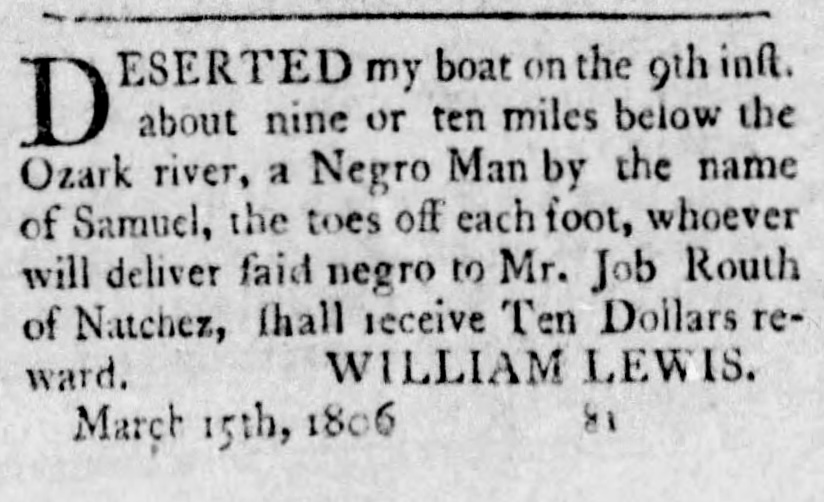
"Deserted my boat" – Samuel's toes may have been removed intentionally as a form of "discipline" (Mississippi Messenger, March 25, 1806)

Job Routh appears as a local man of substantial wealth on the 1807–1812 tax rolls for Adams County, Mississippi Territory, alongside James Wilkins, Samuel Postlethwaite, Abijah Hunt, Alexander Moore, Lyman Harding, Charles Green, John Perkins, John Carmichael, Frederick Seip, Winthrop Sargent, Christopher Miller, Adam Bingaman, Stephen Minor, John Girault, William Vousdan, Jonathan Thompson, and Lewis Evans. In 1816 Job and John Routh were advertising a $30 reward for three enslaved men recently imported from Kentucky; Mike, Isaac, and Sandy ("who speaks good English for an African") had escaped from the Routh property at Lake St. Joseph.

Routh died on December 12, 1834, and was buried in the family cemetery near the present-day site of Dunleith. His executors were his son John Routh, his sons-in-law Austin and Archibald Williams, and his friend Jacob Eiler. He prohibited his daughter Sarah Jane Routh Walker from being named an executrix, and ordered that "'Old Sookey is to choose which child she shall belong to and her husband is also to go to that child whom Sookey chooses,' while Sarah Jane Walker's share of the property was entailed for her children, the trustees or executors being told to allow her the rents or income only from her share."

=== Heirs ===
Job Routh married Ann Madeline Miller, a sister of fellow early settler Christopher Miller. The couple had nine children: Anna, Caroline Matilda, Elizabeth, Francis Routh, Jane, John, Mary, Sarah, and Stephen.

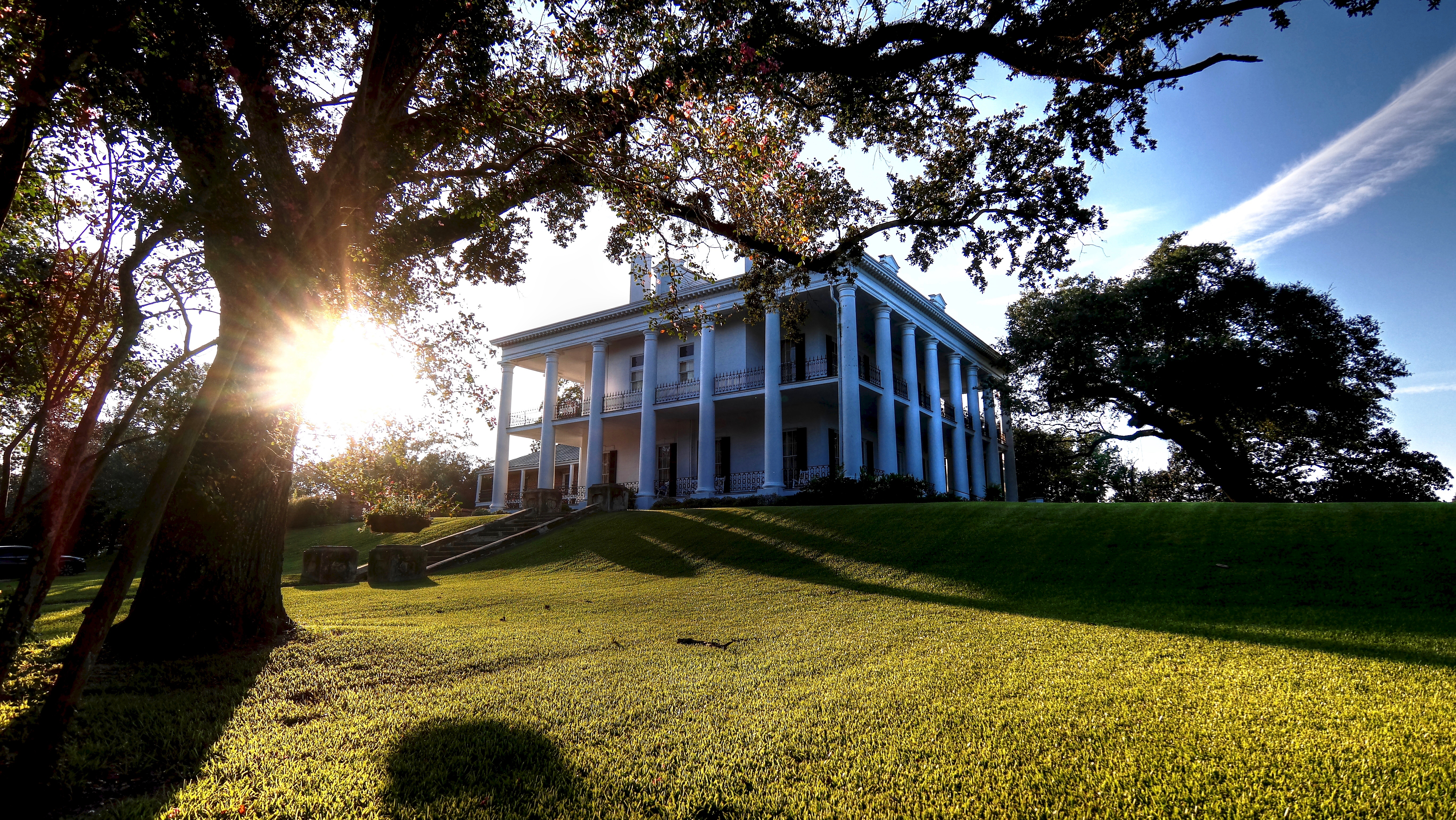
Dunleith, built 1856 on the site of the first Routhlands house (1794–1855), Natchez, Mississippi (2016)

Mary Routh, who married second the banker Charles G. Dahlgren, inherited the Natchez Routhland. This Routhlands house was struck by lightning and burned down in 1855. Charles and Mary were vacationing, in Saratoga, New York, at the time of the fire, but Dahlgren blamed his wife, writing, "'[The house] was struck by lightning and destroyed, in consequence of my wife desiring terra cotta chimney tops placed, which were elevated above the surrounding china trees, and so affording an object for the electric fluid.'...The family returned to Mississippi to find their home a pile of bricks and ashes. Fifteen stuccoed steps marked the site of the main entrance, and a variety of interesting Gothic outbuildings had survived as well. A two-story brick barn and stable, a garage and kennel with a hexagonal columbary, a greenhouse, and a servants' lodge all bear witness to what must have been a sensational home." The Dahlgrens constructed the building now known as Dunleith in its place. Mary Routh Ellis Dahlgren lived there only two years before she died of heart disease in 1858; Dahlgren rapidly remarried and built Llangollen, which burned in 1932.

- John Routh m. Nancy Smith
- Matilda Routh m. Dr. Allen T. Bowie
- Calvin Routh m. Ann Skillman
- Elizabeth Routh m. Archibald Williams
- Caroline Routh m. Austin Williams, they built Ashburn house, which burned in 1873
  - Their daughter, Jeremiah Routh's granddaughter, Julia Augusta Williams married Natchez planter Haller Nutt, and inherited Winter Quarters. Winter Quarters was the only plantation house in the vicinity of Lake Saint Joseph to survive the American Civil War. According to an account of the war passing over the lakeside settlement, "Haller Nutt claimed that between burnings by Confederates and burnings by Federals he had lost more than 4,500 bales of cotton in the war. If this is true, at 1863 cotton prices it was a loss worth US$1,656,000 (equivalent to $43,302,162 in 2025) in U. S. gold." Julia Nutt lived at the unfinished Longwood ("Nutt's Folly") on the Mississippi side of the river after her husband's death in 1864.
- Sarah Routh m. Col. Walker
- Eliza Routh m. William Cochrane
- Frank Routh m. Mary Lane
- Ann M. Routh m1. Lane, m2. Dr. Elias Ogden, "born in Morris Co., N. J., and studied medicine with his uncle Dr. Isaac Ogden...after which he removed to Port Gibson, Miss., where he built up a lucrative practice. While in Port Gibson, he married Mrs. Ann M. Lane, nee Routh, who owned one of the largest and finest plantations in that section of the country, lying in the suburbs of Natchez, Miss. Here he built an elegant residence called Kenilworth, retired from the active practice of his profession, and devoted himself to the care of the extensive estate belonging to his wife." Dr. Ogden bought the defaulted Routhlands from the sheriff in 1842, and sold it back to his mother-in-law.

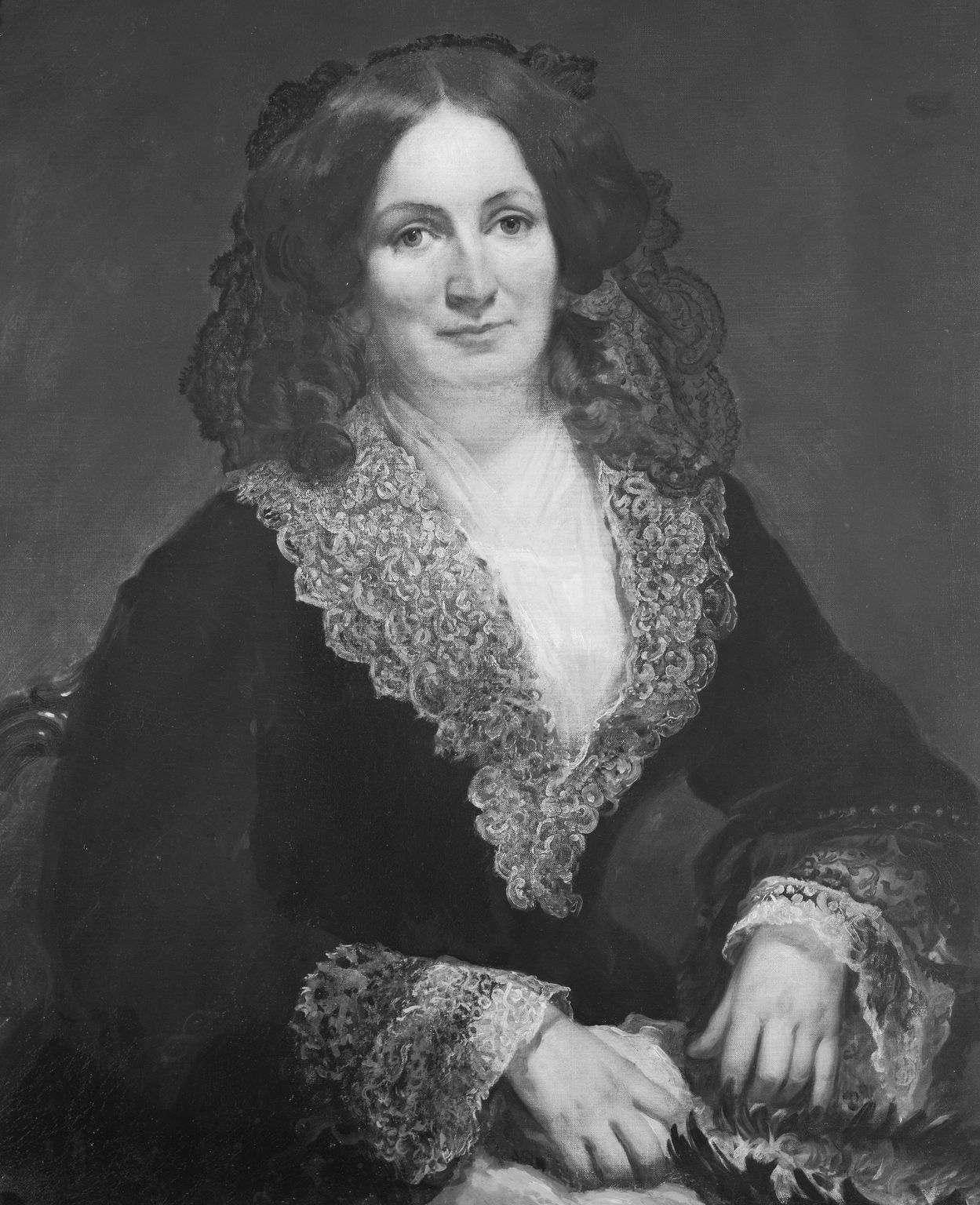
Mary Malvina Routh Ellis Dahlgren, painted 1854 by Charles Loring Elliott, first mistress of Dunleith (Telfair Museums, Savannah, Georgia)

- Mary Routh m1. Thomas G. P. Ellis (son of John Ellis), m2. Charles Dahlgren – Mary was the youngest; she married Ellis of Wilkinson County in May 1828. Upon Job Routh's death, the Ellises sold Hope Farm (also known as Hope Villa) to Eli Montgomery, whose family occupied it for the next 90 years. Job Routh's wife was Eli Montgomery's aunt, through the Millers. Eli Montgomery was kin to the local politician Alexander Montgomery and lawyer Alexander Montgomery, the latter of whom was partners for a time with S.S. Boyd, who was partners for a time with Rice C. Ballard, who had been partners for a time with Isaac Franklin.
  - Sarah Ellis (1829–1879) m. Samuel Worthington Dorsey; she was a novelist and patron of post-war Jefferson Davis

== Jeremiah Routh II ==
Jeremiah Routh Jr. (1763–1815) was the youngest of Jeremiah Routh Sr.'s four children. Natchez at the turn of the 19th century was a barely governed borderland, and "ads for the sale of slaves insinuated that African American women might be used as prostitutes. Jeremiah Routh placed this cryptic ad in one local newspaper in 1804, 'for sale or hire. Eleven young Negro girls, all capable of business...'"

Jeremiah and Job Routh owed past-due taxes for 1805 on 500 acres in Jefferson County, Mississippi Territory; their lands would be sold at auction unless they paid. In 1806, Jeremiah Routh "sold to Lewis Evans his plantation consisting of two hundred acres situated, lying and being within the limits of Natchez, bounded on the east by lands of Job Routh, on the west by John Girault's lands and on the north by William Barland's. The latter owned the Elms and much land in the heart of Natchez." His wife Ann died at age 30 in 1810.

Jeremiah Routh Jr. was said to have once owned a place called Midway Plantation near Waterproof in Tensas Parish, Louisiana.

== John Routh ==
John Routh (1791–1867), eldest son of Job and a grandson of Jeremiah I, was a major slave owner and plantation owner. He was known as the king of Tensas Parish, Louisiana. John Routh was married to Ann Smith, a niece of Philander Smith and Calvin Smith. One of their sons drowned or was present for the drowning in Second Creek of two of their Gillespie cousins in 1836. John Routh died 1867 at Natchez.

He was present at the Battle of New Orleans. In 1824, Job Routh deeded 10 acres of land to his son John Routh. John Routh then constructed Routhland, the third house by that name in the lower Mississippi delta, and the only one surviving today near Natchez. In 1829, in Concordia Parish, Louisiana, John Routh purchased 41 people from Tennessee slave trader Charles Bossly, possibly because registering the purchase in Louisiana meant that the state's redhibition (slave warranty) laws would cover the purchase.

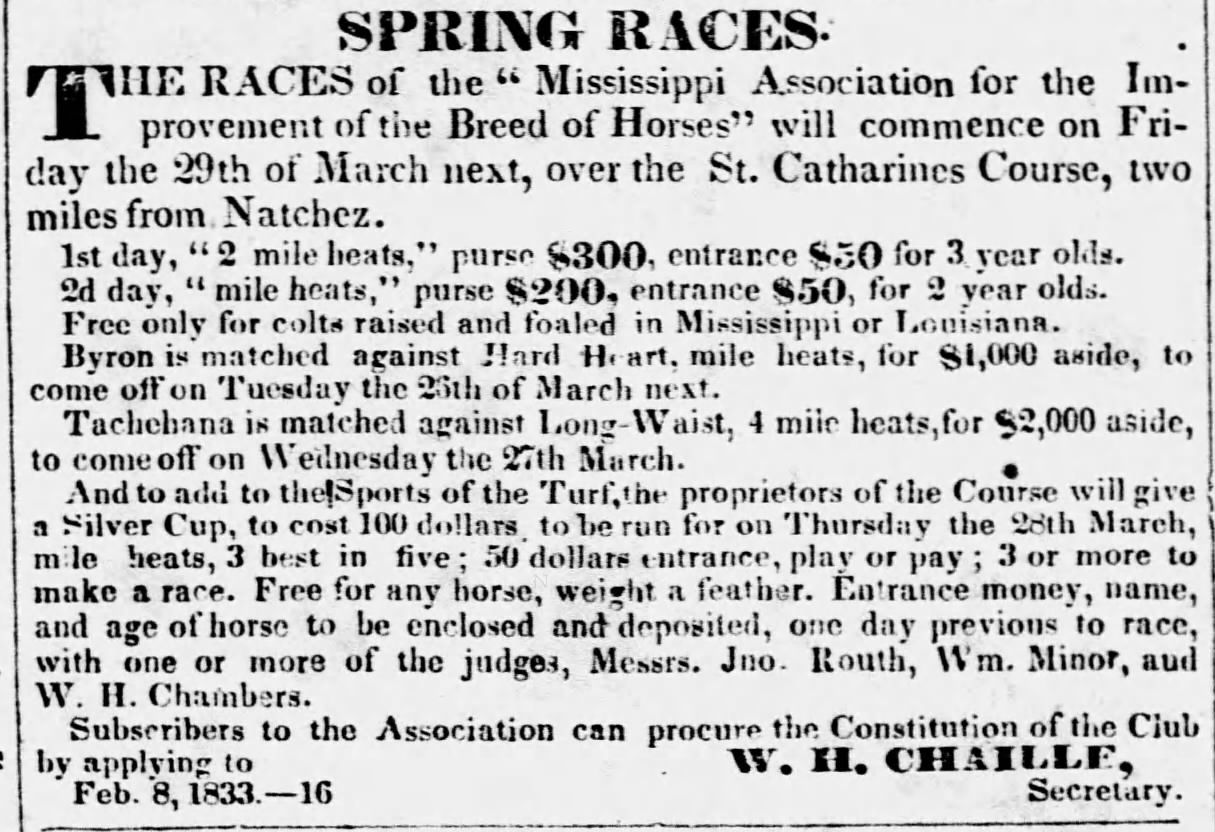
Routh was an organizer of the "Spring Races" at St Catherines Course (Mississippi Free Trader, Natchez, February 15, 1833)

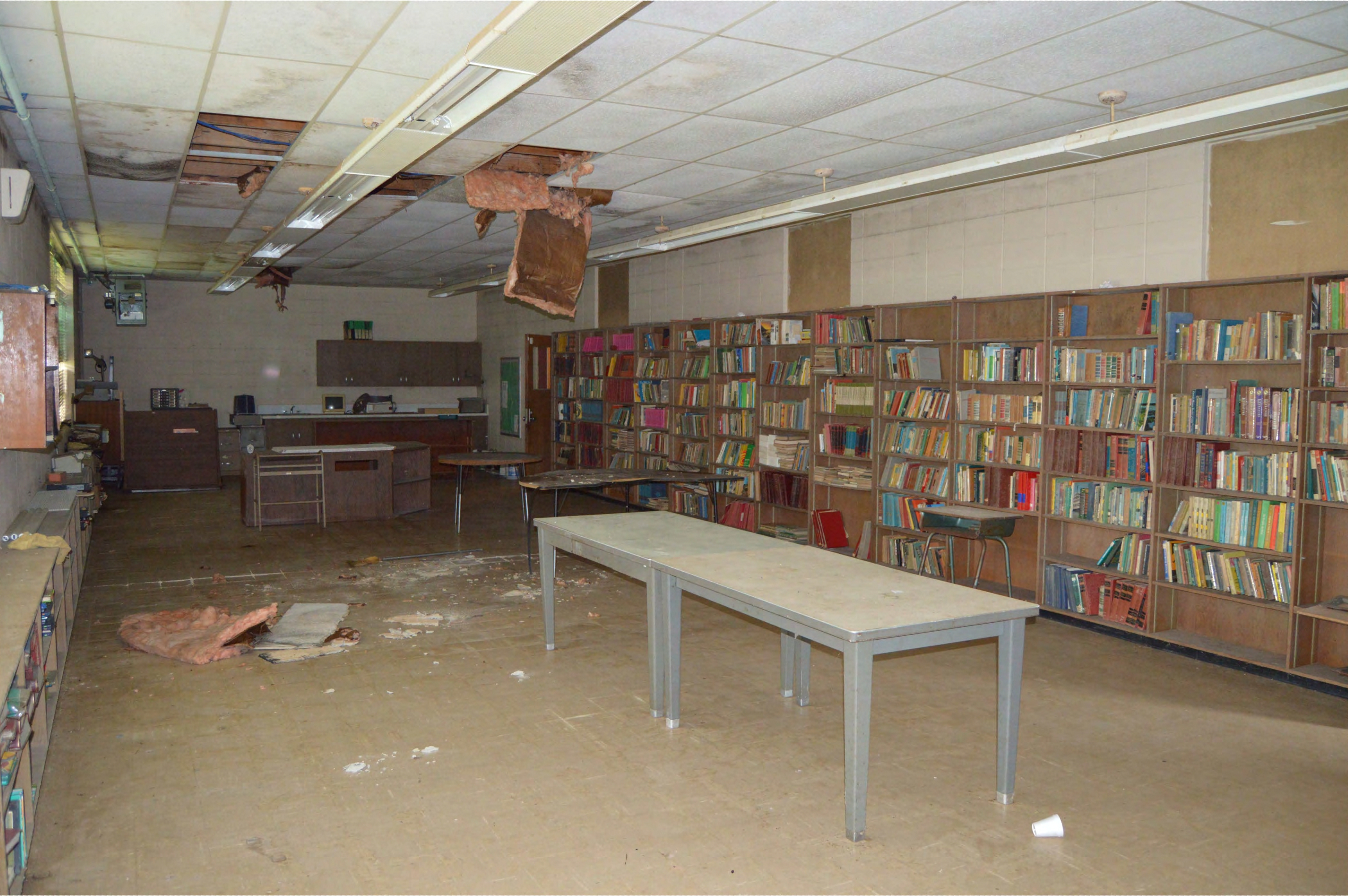
The now-abandoned Routhwood Elementary School (library pictured 2015) in Newellton was a segregated school for Black children that opened in 1957; the school took its name from the Routh family's Routhwood plantation

In 1832 he was appointed a director of the United States Bank in company with James C. Wilkins, William Shipp, Alvarez Fisk, William Ferriday, John Baynton, John P. Walworth, John A. Quitman, Henry W. Vick, Thomas G. Ellis, Richmond Bledsoe, Henry Chotard, and Gustavus Calhoun. In 1838 he was an investor in the Mississippi Towboat Company and the Natchez Steam Packet Company along with fellow company officers Stephen Duncan, James Wilkins, Levin Marshall, Alvarez Fisk, Adam L. Bingaman, and William J. Minor.

In 1850, he enslaved 276 people on a cotton plantation in Tensas Parish, Louisiana, and was one of the top 20 slave owners in that state. In 1851 he and his nephew-by-marriage Thomas Dorsey were appointed executors of the estate of William Adams Jr. Adams' father sued to prevent the estate from manumitting of an enslaved woman named Nancy Adams and giving her a bequest of $3,000. The court ruled in favor of the father.

By 1860 he legally owned 300 people. The property he held in Tensas Parish that year was worth an estimated US$1,214,000 (equivalent to $43,501,667 in 2025). His plantations were said to have produced more than 6,000 bales a year at times. In January 1861 he was called "one of the largest planters in the Union," and ran as a "co-operationist" candidate for the Louisiana secession convention and was "beaten eight to one by his fellow planters."

=== American Civil War ===
John Routh was said to have been financially ruined by the war and/or his plantation near Lake St. Joseph was sacked by the Yankees, robbed of silver plate, and burned. Troops led by Ulysses S. Grant arrived at Lake St. Joseph on April 25, 1863. According to one soldier's account, "an old Negro man" at Holly Wood plantation reported that John Routh had fled and "taken five hundred slaves, and as much livestock as possible, downriver to Rodney, Mississippi." Routh later wrote a letter clarifying that it was 400 slaves and $20,000 worth of stuff that could be carried away:

"One tureen and stand, 2 waiters, 4 dozen large and 4 dozen small forks, 4 dozen dessert and 4 dozen teaspoons, 4 dozen large [spoons], 4 covered dishes, 1 coffee urn, 2 waiters, 4 dozen large, 4 dozen small forks, 1 egg stand, 2 fruit trays, 4 saucer mats, 2 forks, 1 egg stand, 2 fruit trays, 4 saucer mats, 2 teapots, 1 slopbowl, 2 sugar dishes, 1 milk pitcher with cover, 1 spoon stand, 4 wine tumblers, 4 dozen tumblers, 6 punch tumblers with arms, 1 punch vessel with urn and ladle, 2 large ladles, 4 small ones, 2 large gravy spoons, 2 pitchers, 6 salt sets, 1 dozen egg spoons, 1 dozen coffee spoons (in sixes). All of the above were marked 'H. W.,' the initials of the name of my home place (Holly Wood); and of a different pattern, 1 dozen large, 1 dozen dessert, and one dozen table spoons, marked 'Hilly Wood' [sic], 1 dozen large spoons marked 'R.,' 1 dozen small spoons marked 'R'; all the foregoing articles are solid silver, and the following plated articles: Six water pitchers, 6 dish covers, 8 chafing dishes and stands, 1 teakettle with stand and lamp, 1 coffee and 1 teapots, 2 pitchers, 6 flower pots and glasses, 4 pair of candlesticks; 10 dozen napkins, large size, 8 dozen doilies, 4 dozen worsted do., 20 pair of linen sheets, 10 pair of cotton sheets, 20 pair of marseilles counterpanes, 12 pairs of blankets, 1 large afghan lined and with tassels, 5 green silk curtains, lined; 2 sets of 3 curtains each (damask), 1 set of 5 curtains, 2 barrels of whisky, 1 of rum, 4 barrels of lard, 2 of pork, 3 of sugar, 3 of bacon, 50 bushels of salt, 2 boxes of cotton for negroes' clothes, 2 boxes of shoes, 2 boxes of books, 1 box, 7 bottles powder, 10 or 12 bags of assorted shot, residue, [and] a large number of articles of which I have no memorandum."

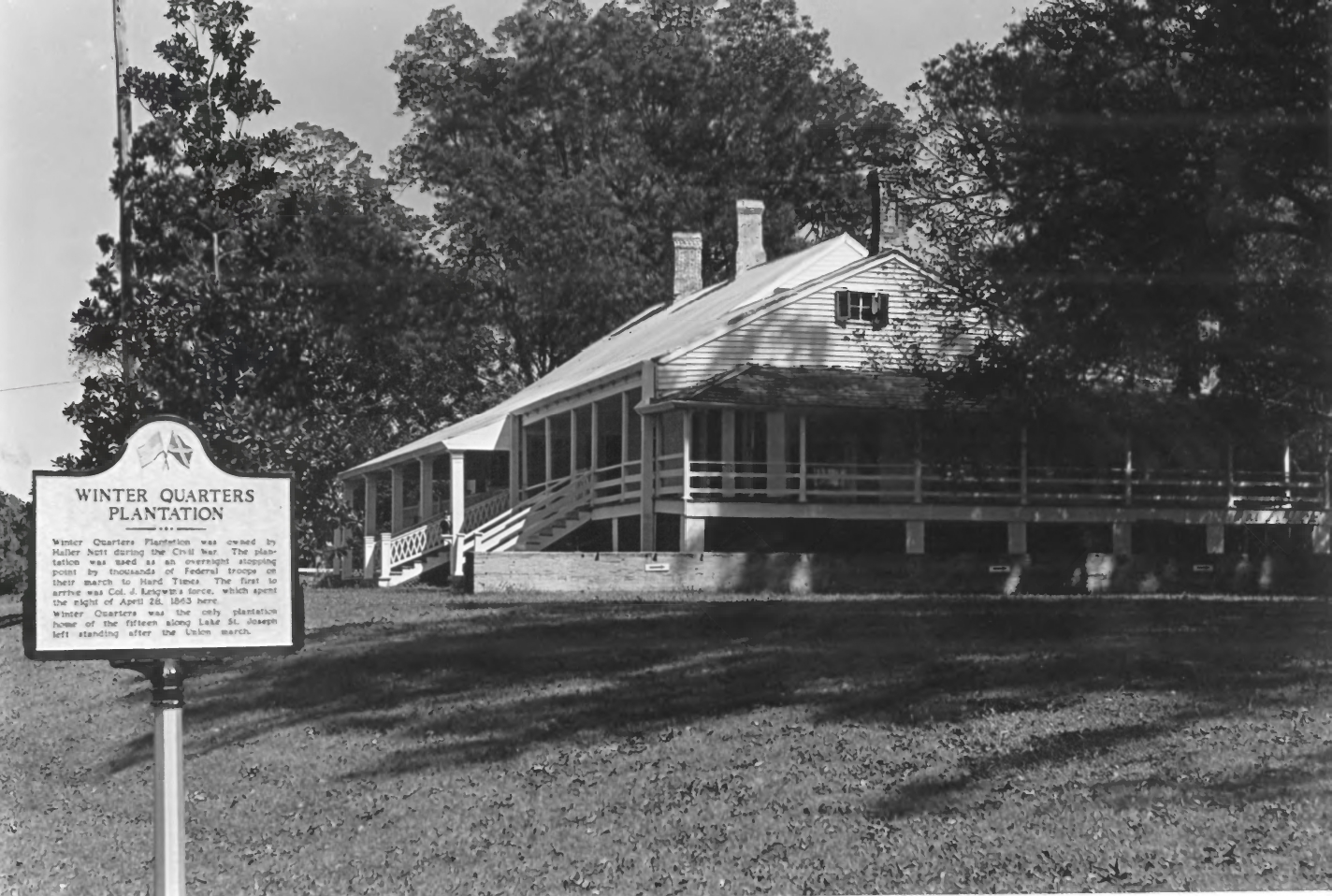
Winter Quarters was built on land granted to the Routh family in 1803; in 1863, when it was owned by Haller Nutt and his wife, John Routh's niece, Julia Routh Williams Nutt, it was the only "big house" on Lake St. Joseph that was not burned down by the U.S. Army during their march on Vicksburg (1976)

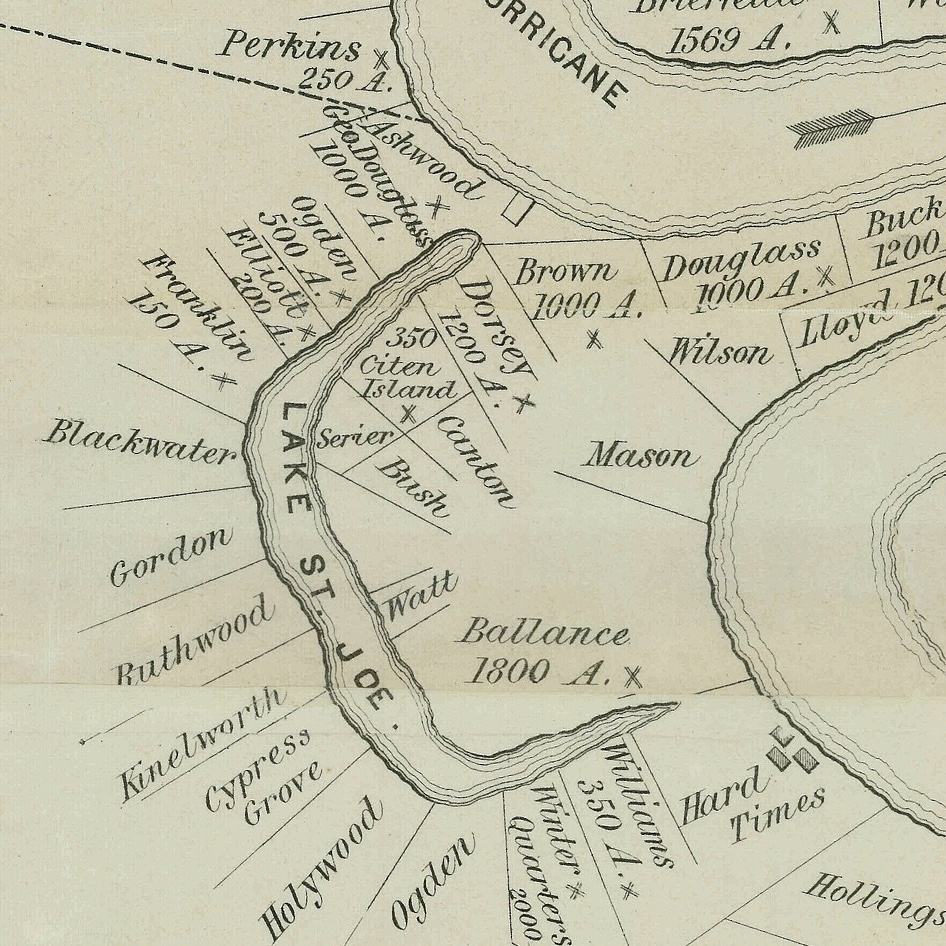
Plantations bordering Lake St. Joseph in Tensas Parish, mapped during the Reconstruction era

As part of the larger Vicksburg campaign, thousands of Federal troops gleaned what they would from the resources of the Lake St. Joseph in order to sustain themselves, under foraging orders like one from William T. Sherman, to Frank Blair: "Don't hurry your march too much...you will be delighted with the country. [If you] be delayed, camp back about Routh's place, which is magnificent, with plenty of corn-fodder and everything. The house and farm have been plundered sadly, but the planters had all gone off, and no one left to protect them." Elizabeth Ingraham, a plantation wife and sister of United States Army general George Meade, wrote in her journal that she had been told, "'From Milliken's Bend to Hard Times there is scarcely a house left,' gutted, if not burnt, and mostly burnt." Big houses, outbuildings, and slave cabins alike were torn apart for material to "bridge Bayous Holt and DuRosset" and framework and fencing alike was deconstructed to make "'shebangs'—soldiers' huts and campfires" and everything left over was set on fire for the sheer mayhem of it. Among the plantation houses burned were the Routh family-owned Holly Wood and Routhwood. In the telling of historian Ed Bearss, in May 1863 another group of U.S. Army soldiers in the vicinity of Lake St. Joseph were "shocked to see the wholesale destruction inflicted on the Bowie, Gordon, and John Routh plantations" by men serving under James M. Tuttle, who commanded a division in Sherman's XV Corps.

== Francis Routh ==
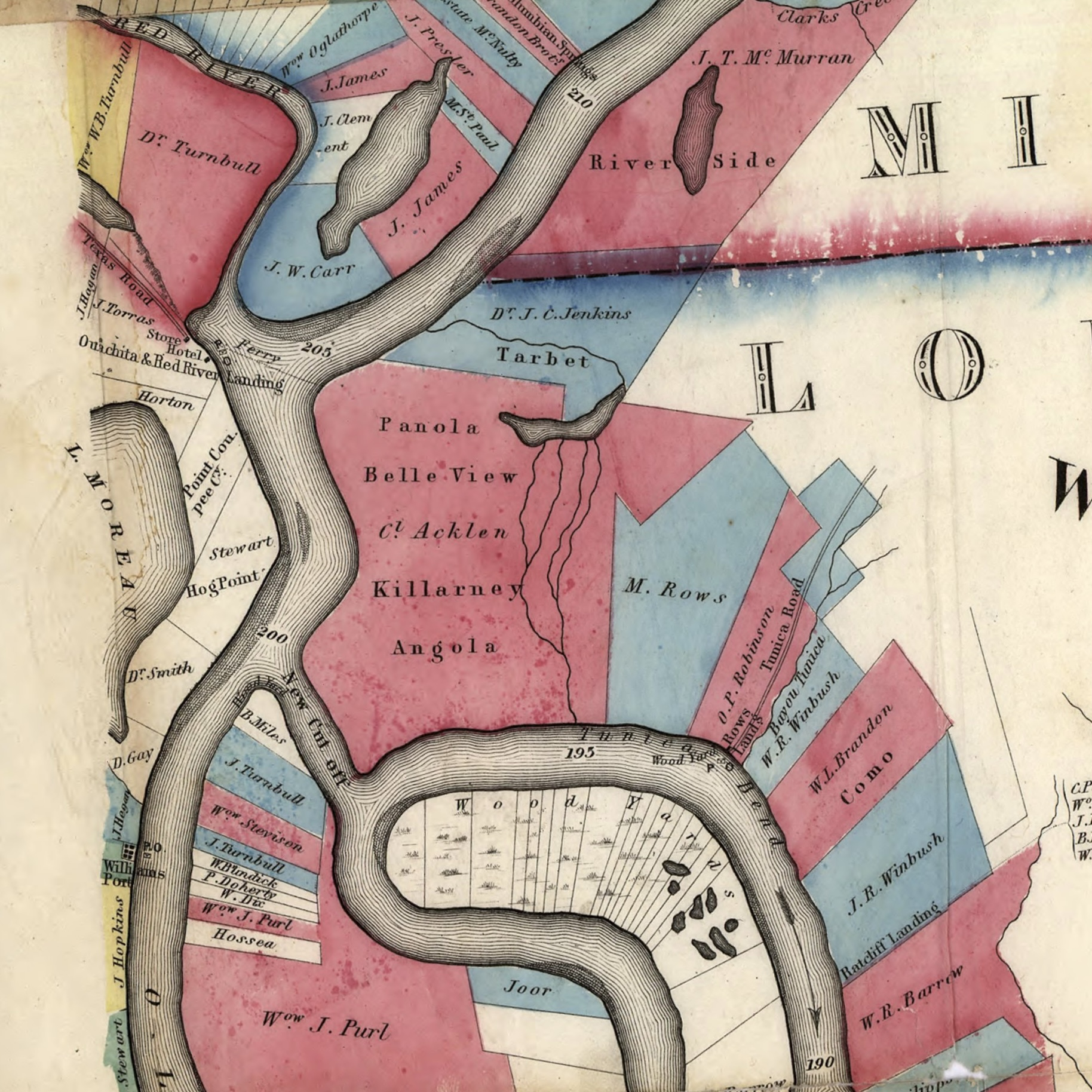
Map of Adelicia Acklen's Panola, Belle View, Killarney, and Angola plantations in Louisiana in 1858

Francis "Frank" Routh (1804–1878), son of Job Routh, was reportedly the builder of Kenilworth plantation. In 1828, John, a 30-year-old enslaved man marked by a burn scar and a knife scar, ran away from Francis Routh's place near Lake St. Joseph. In 1827, Francis Routh began buying up land in West Feliciana Parish, Louisiana. By the mid-1830s Francis Routh was a co-owner with slave-trade baron Isaac Franklin of a large parcel of plantation land along the Mississippi River. Routh declared bankruptcy in the wake of the Panic of 1837, which disrupted the entire local economy: "When President Jackson ordered that public lands be paid for in specie, a general demand for cash brought on a great crash. Banks failed all over the country and 1837 ushered in a depression known as 'Hard Times'. There actually seemed to be no money. Chancery records show that hundreds of homes and plantations were sold at public auction. The price of land had dropped to zero, so that men, rich in lands and property, could neither sell or raise cash on them. The Vicksburg Whig of 1839 published a list of Mississippi banks that failed between 1837 and 1839, and the length of the list is appalling. Rich men were beggared by the thousands."

Isaac Franklin bought Routh out of Loch Lomond, Bellevue, and Killarney plantations, assembling a parcel that is today the site of Angola State Prison. In 1844, Francis Routh was put up as the Democratic candidate for the 4th Senatorial district of Mississippi. He had a daughter, Rosaltha Francina Routh, who married John Ker II in 1848. He died at a son-in-law's house in 1878 in Catahoula Parish, Louisiana.

== See also ==
- Percy family (United States)
- Routh Mounds – Archaeological site in Tensas Parish, Louisiana, U.S.
- St. Catherine Creek National Wildlife Refuge
- Tensas River National Wildlife Refuge

== Sources ==
- Buckner, Timothy Ryan (August 2005). Constructing Identities on the Frontier of Slavery, Natchez, Mississippi, 1760–1860 (Thesis). University of Texas at Austin.
- Gillis, Norman; Gillis, Irene S. (n.d.). Early Inhabitants of the Natchez District. [Per LOC, possibly published 1963]. Shreveport, Louisiana. LCCN 64002728. OCLC 732676231. FHL 153410.
- James, D. Clayton (1993) [1968]. Antebellum Natchez. Baton Rouge, Louisiana: Louisiana State University Press. ISBN 978-0-8071-1860-3. LCCN 68028496. OCLC 28281641.
- Jones, William D. (2021). "Beyond New Orleans: Forced Migrations To, From, and In Louisiana, 1820–1860". Louisiana History: The Journal of the Louisiana Historical Association. 62 (4): 429–468. ISSN 0024-6816. JSTOR 27095320.
- Miller, Mary Carol (2010). Lost Mansions of Mississippi, Volume II. Jackson, Mississippi: University Press of Mississippi. ISBN 978-1-60473-786-8. JSTOR j.ctt12f5r8. LCCN 2010010308. OCLC 859672125. Project MUSE book 1324.
- Moore, Edith Wyatt (1958). Natchez Under-the-Hill. Natchez, Mississippi: Southern Historical Publications.
- Murray, Elizabeth Dunbar (1938). Early Romances of Historic Natchez. Natchez, Mississippi: Natchez Printing & Stationery Co. OCLC 5463608.
- Owens, Jeffrey Alan (Autumn 1991). "The Burning of Lake St. Joseph". Louisiana History: The Journal of the Louisiana Historical Association. 32 (4): 393–415. ISSN 0024-6816. JSTOR 4232909.
- Scarborough, William Kauffman (2012) [2003]. Masters of the Big House: Elite Slaveholders of the Mid-Nineteenth-Century South. Baton Rouge: Louisiana State University Press. ISBN 9780807156001. LCCN 2003007301. OCLC 846496079. Project MUSE book 23668.
- Van Court, Catharine (1937). "XX: Dunleith". In old Natchez. Garden City, N.Y.: Doubleday, Doran.
