= Llangollen (disambiguation) =

Llangollen is a town in Wales. Llangollen may also refer to:

- Llangollen Canal, on the English–Welsh border
- Llangollen Railway, heritage railway
- Llangollen railway station
- Llangollen International Musical Eisteddfod
- Llangollen Town F.C., association football club
- Llangollen (Natchez, Mississippi), demolished American mansion
- Llangollen Farm, Virginia, United States
