= Routhwood Elementary School =

- U.S. National Register of Historic Places
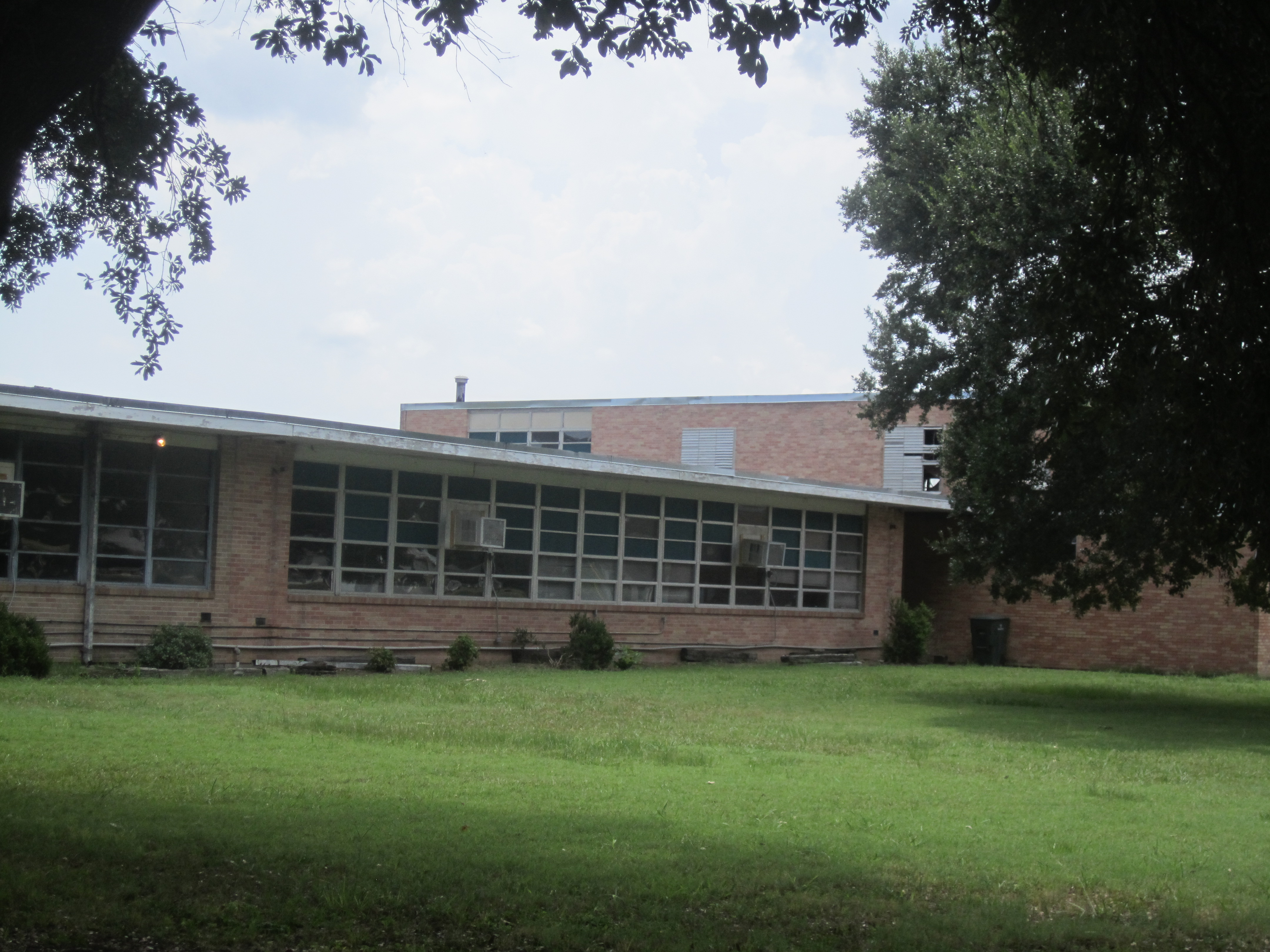
- Unused building in 2010

- Location within Louisiana Location within the United States
- Location: 217 Lombardo St., Newellton, Louisiana
- Coordinates: 32°04′19″N 91°14′21″W
- Area: 6.2 acres (2.5 ha)
- NRHP reference No.: 15000698
- Added to NRHP: October 6, 2015

The Routhwood Elementary School in Newellton, Louisiana was listed on the National Register of Historic Places in 2015.

The listing included four buildings:

- Classroom and Administrative Building (1957), a one-story brick building
- Gymnasium (1967),
- Auditorium-Cafeteria Building (1957), and
- Library Building (1967)

== See also ==
- Routh family
