= Winter Quarters State Historic Site =

- Winter Quarters
- U.S. National Register of Historic Places
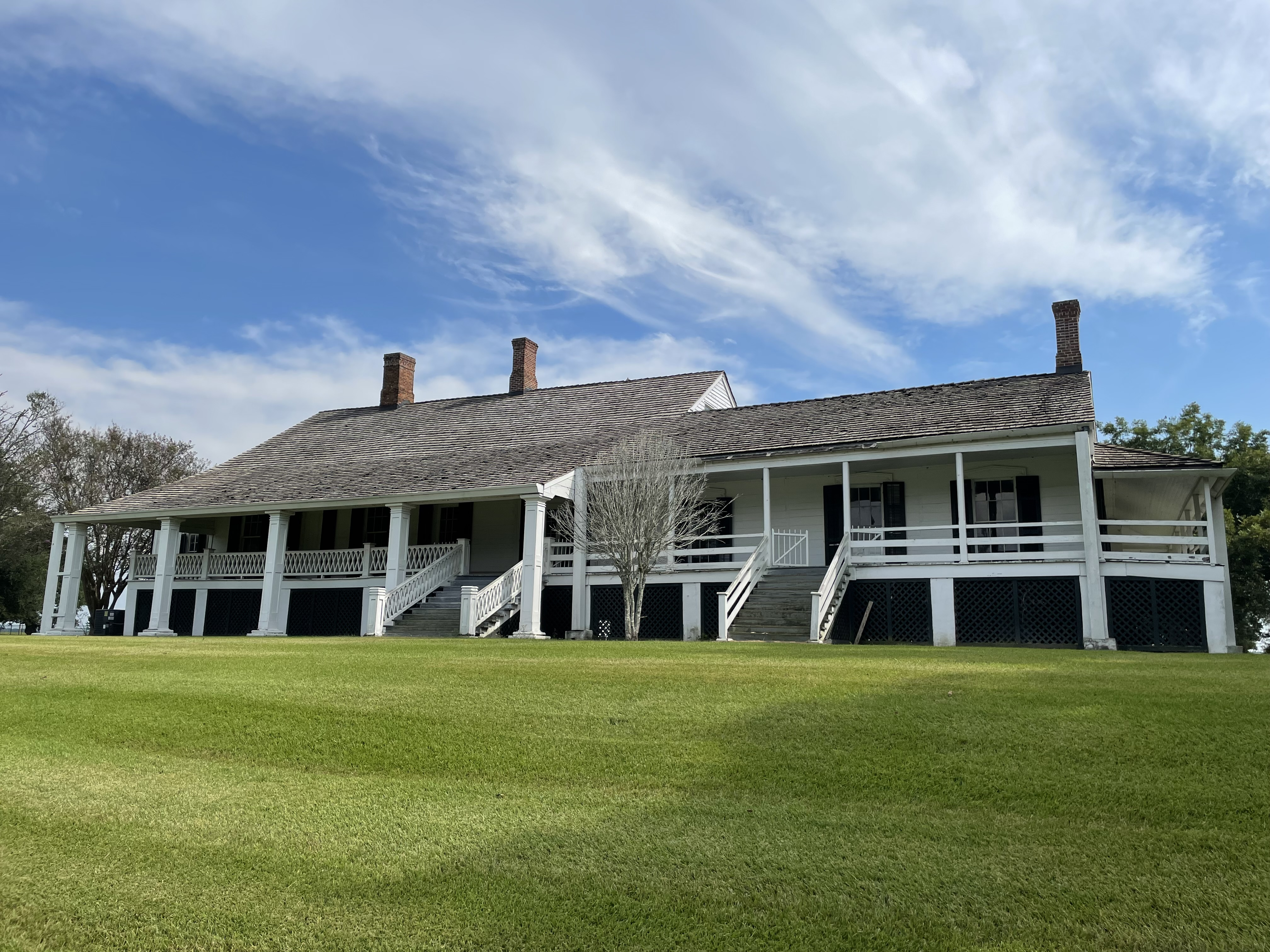
- Front of Winter Quarters

- Location within Louisiana Location within the United States
- Nearest city: Newellton, Louisiana
- Coordinates: 32°0′46.368″N 91°10′33.96″W
- Area: 7 acres (2.8 ha)
- Built: 1803
- NRHP reference No.: 78001437
- Added to NRHP: November 21, 1978

Winter Quarters in Tensas Parish, Louisiana, United States, is a surviving example of an antebellum cotton plantation. It is located south of Newellton on Lake St. Joseph, an ox-bow lake, or former bend in the Mississippi River.

== History ==
The main plantation house began as a hunting lodge in 1805 built by Job Routh, grandfather of Julia Augusta (Williams) Nutt, but was soon enlarged and became a residence. The plantation was so named because the residents lived elsewhere during most of the year but came south for the winter. Before the Vicksburg Campaign of 1863 during the American Civil War, there were fifteen plantations along Lake St. Joseph. However, Union troops destroyed all of them except Winter Quarters, where the soldiers were housed during the winter of 1863–1864. The plantation belonged to the wife of Haller Nutt, a planter who was pro-Union. As a result, General Ulysses S. Grant ensured the plantation would not be damaged.

Wade A. Netterville, brother of the plantation manager J. H. Netterville of Newellton, managed the store at Winter Quarters in the early years of the 20th century, employed in that capacity by the then plantation owner Dr. J. M. Gillespie. Netterville then ran the store at Panola Plantation prior to becoming the manager for two years of the Wyoming Plantation. He subsequently assumed the management of the 1,000-acre Panda Plantation near the parish seat of government in St. Joseph.

During the 1950s, the James and Bea Doyle family lived at Winter Quarters. Their daughter, Barbara Sue Doyle Hage (1949-2016), was the 1962 March of Dimes poster child and at the time of her death at the age of sixty-six the oldest known survivor of spina bifida. Barbara Hage graduated in 1969 from Newellton High School and worked for a quarter century for the Louisiana State University Extension Service in St. Joseph. She was also a church pianist and vocalist, seamstress, and gardener. She and her husband, David C. Hage, had a daughter and two grandsons.

In 1978, Winter Quarters was placed on the National Register of Historic Places and was previously open for public tours.

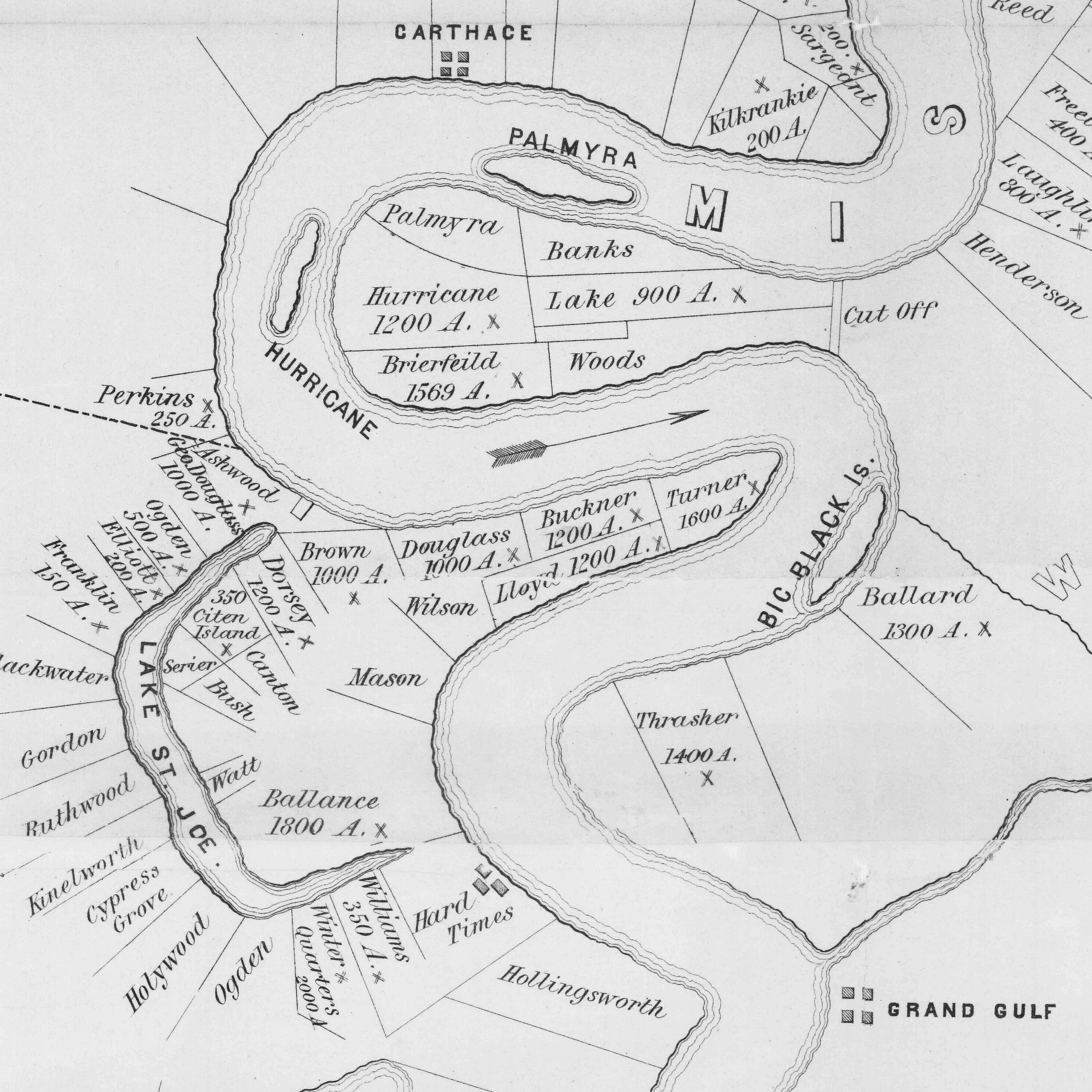
Plantations in the vicinity of Lake St. Joseph circa 1866 including Hard Times and Winter Quarters

The site was critically damaged in a tornado on April 4, 2011. As of February 2022, the site remains closed indefinitely and the State of Louisiana currently has no plans or a set date for reopening the site for public use.
