= 3rd Mississippi Infantry Regiment =

Infantry regiment of the Confederate States Army

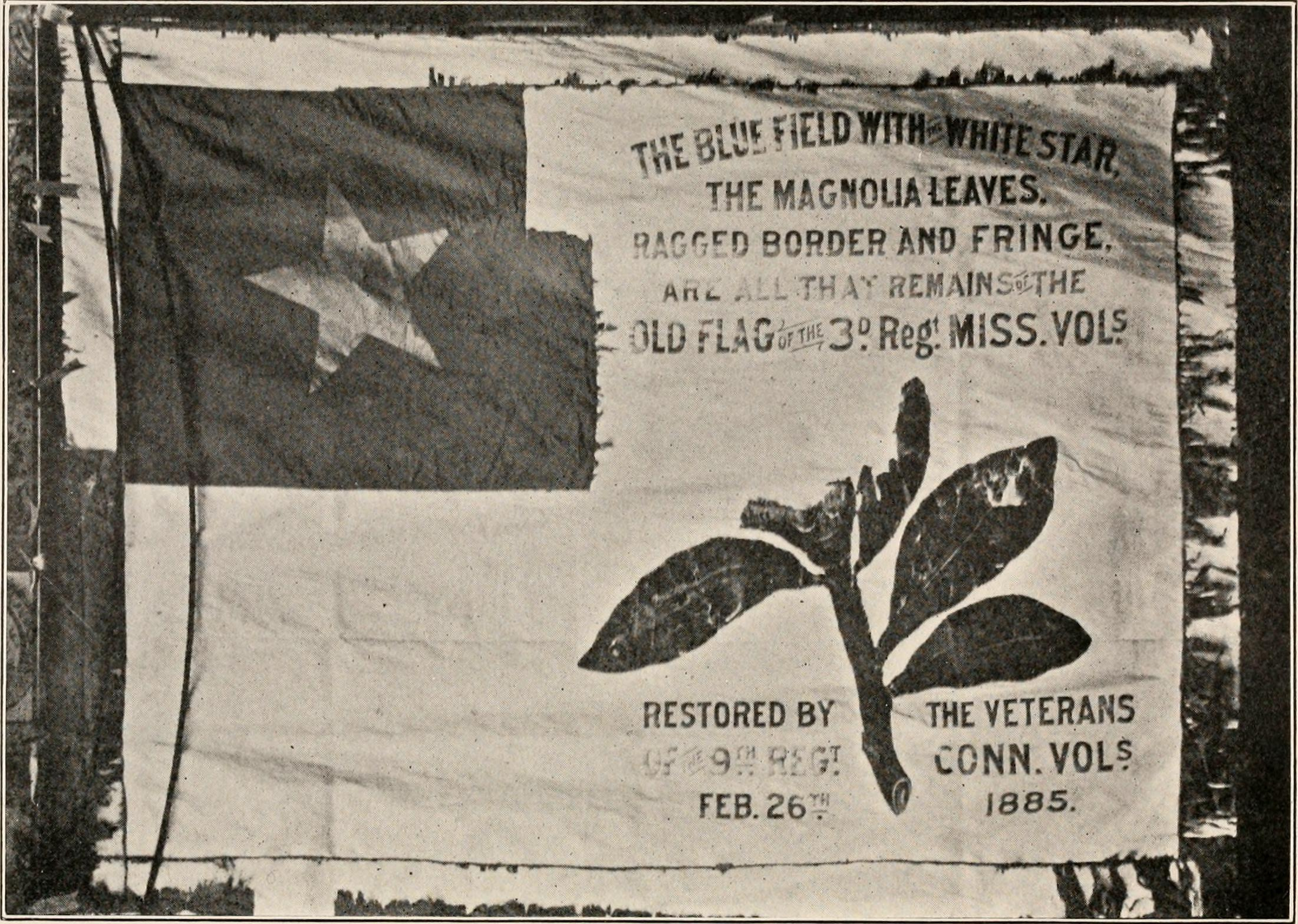
- Company Color of the Dahlgren Guards captured by Federal forces at Pass Christian, Mississippi, 1862
- Active: 1861–1865
- Disbanded: May 1, 1865
- Country: Confederate States
- Allegiance: Mississippi
- Branch: Army
- Type: Infantry
- Size: Regiment
- Nickname: "Third Mississippi"
- Facings: Light blue
- Campaigns: American Civil War; Vicksburg Campaign; Meridian Campaign; Atlanta campaign; Franklin-Nashville Campaign; Carolinas campaign

The 3rd Mississippi Infantry Regiment was an infantry formation of the Confederate States Army in the Western Theater of the American Civil War.

== History ==
The 3rd Regiment was organized in August 1861 at Bay St. Louis, originally for state service, composed of volunteer companies mostly from the Mississippi Gulf Coast region. The 3rd was initially assigned to coastal defense under the command of Mississippi brigadier general Charles G. Dahlgren, although it was briefly sent to Columbus, Kentucky in November in response to a request for support from Confederate general Leonidas Polk, returning to the coast in January, 1862. Union forces captured nearby Ship Island in December 1861 and used it as a base to raid the Gulf Coast and prepare for a campaign to capture New Orleans. On April 3, a Federal force supported by gunboats landed at Biloxi, leaving before the 3rd Mississippi could launch a serious counterattack. The next day, Pass Christian was raided, and the 3rd Mississippi's regimental colors were captured from their abandoned camp by the 9th Connecticut.

In May 1862 the regiment re-enlisted for the duration of the war, and was sent to Vicksburg to aid in the defense of the city. In early 1863, the 3rd was assigned to General Winfield S. Featherston's brigade, with a reported strength of 572 men. The 3rd played a supporting role in the Battle of Champion Hill in May 1863. Featherston's brigade was outside the city's defensive lines, so the 3rd Regiment was not captured when the Vicksburg garrison surrendered on July 4. The 3rd took part in the Meridian campaign opposing Union General William T. Sherman's march across Mississippi, and was then transferred to Georgia in 1864.

During the Atlanta campaign, the 3rd Regiment fought at New Hope Church, Kennesaw Mountain, and Peachtree Creek before the city was captured by Union forces. In his after-action report describing the fighting at Kennesaw Mountain, General Featherston wrote that the "Third Mississippi Regiment acted with great coolness, courage, and determination". The 3rd Mississippi then took part in the Franklin–Nashville campaign in the fall of 1864. Lieutenant Colonel Samuel M. Dyer was wounded during fierce fighting in the Battle of Franklin. After the defeat at the Battle of Nashville, the 3rd retreated to Mississippi. Losses in the Atlanta and Tennessee campaigns had reduced the Regiment to only 71 men by December 1864.

In the spring of 1865 the regiment took part in the Carolinas campaign, fighting in the Battle of Bentonville. Shortly before the Confederate surrender, the 3rd, 33rd, and 40th Mississippi Infantry regiments were consolidated into a single unit, called the 3rd Regiment. This combined regiment surrendered in North Carolina on April 26, 1865.

== Commanding officers ==
Commanders of the 3rd Mississippi Infantry:

- Col. John B. Deason
- Col. Thomas A. Mellon
- Col. James M. Stigler (consolidated regiment, April 1865)
- Lt. Col. Robert Eager
- Lt. Col. E.A. Peyton
- Lt. Col. James B. McRae
- Lt. Col. Samuel M. Dyer

== Organization ==
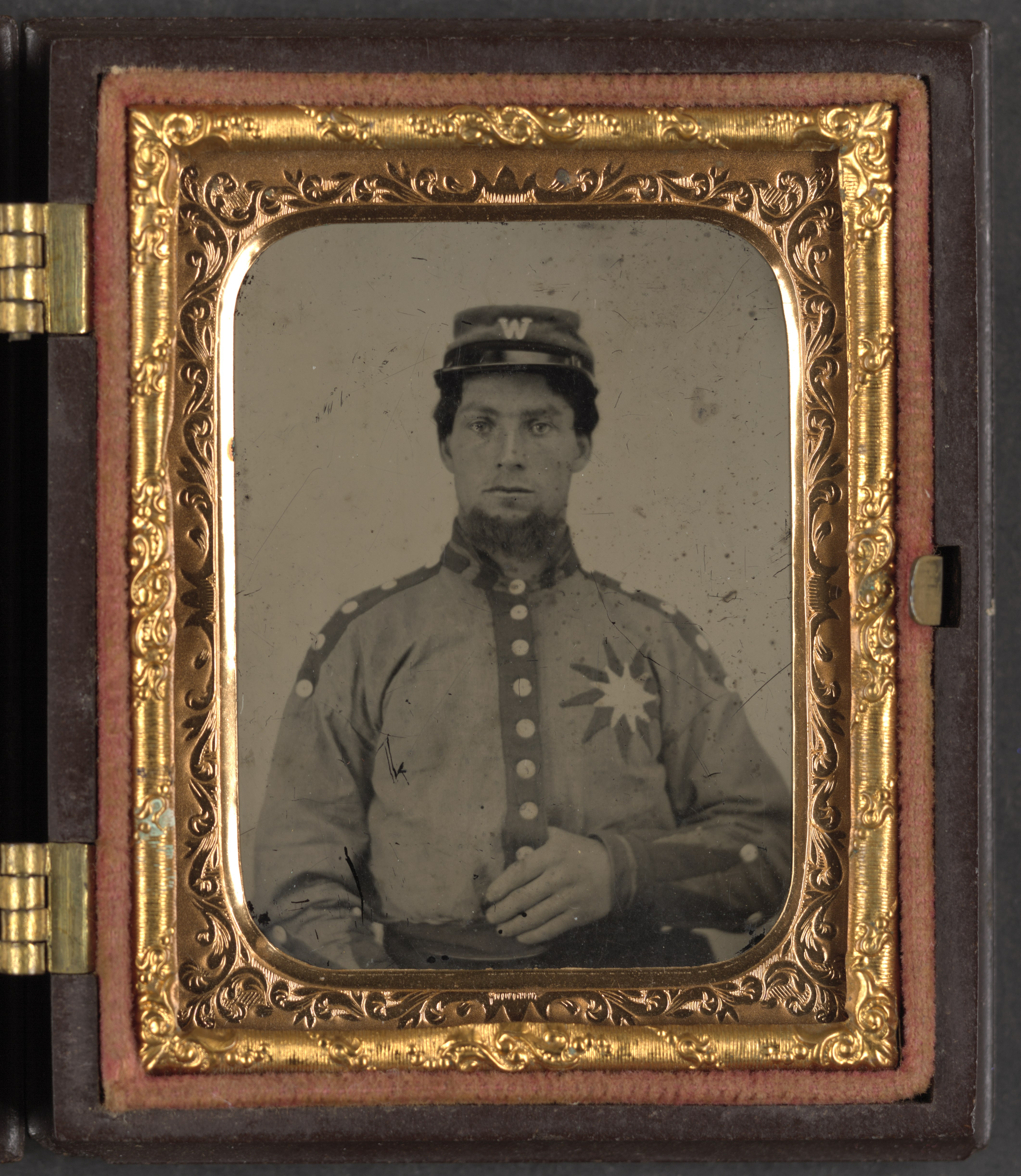
Soldier of Company B, 3rd Mississippi Infantry

Companies of the 3rd Mississippi Infantry :

- Company A, "Live Oak Rifles" of Ocean Springs.
- Company B, "Sunflower Dispersers" of Sunflower County.
- Company C, "Downing Rifles" of Hinds County.
- Company D, "Chunky Heroes" of Newton County.
- Company E, "Biloxi Rifles" of Harrison County
- Company F, "Dahlgren Guards", of Harrison County
- Company G, "Gainesville Volunteers" of Harrison County.
- Company H, "Shieldsboro Rifles" of Hancock County.
- Company I, "Yazoo Rebels" of Yazoo County
- Company K, "McWillie Blues", of Copiah County

== See also ==
- List of Mississippi Civil War Confederate units
