= C. B. Forgotston =

American lawyer

- Born: Charlton Bath Forgotston, Jr. January 19, 1945; Newellton, Louisiana, U.S.
- Died: January 3, 2016 (aged 70); Hammond, Louisiana, U.S.
- Education: Louisiana State University
- Occupations: Attorney; Conservative political activist
- Spouse: Ella Joy Adams

Charlton Bath Forgotston, Jr., known as C. B. Forgotston (January 19, 1945 – January 3, 2016), was an American attorney, political pundit and state government watchdog from Hammond in southeastern Louisiana. For seven years, he was the chief counsel of the Appropriations Committee of the Louisiana House of Representatives. Long affected by bipolar disorder, Forgotston committed suicide by firearm early in 2016, at age 70.

== Background ==
Forgotston was born to Charlton Bath Forgotston (1913–1987) and Elsa de Vries (1918–2014) in Newellton, Louisiana. The senior Forgotston owned Newellton Electric Company and served for twenty years on the Newellton Town Council.

In 2013, Forgotston opposed Bobby Jindal's proposal to end the Louisiana state income tax accompanied by an increase in sales taxes. At the time, Forgotston correctly predicted that Jindal's plan would fail to clear the legislature because of the higher sales taxes, the lack of needed Democratic support to offset Republican defectors, and the likelihood that the plan would not increase overall state revenues. After Jindal subsequently withdrew the plan because of the lack of public and legislative support, the Louisiana Republican Party issued a personal attack on Forgotston.

== Death and legacy ==
Forgotston remained engaged in the private practice of law until his death. He and his wife, Ella Joy "E. J." Adams (born March 1944), a former interior decorator originally from Kentwood in Tangipahoa Parish, moved there from New Orleans after being struck by Hurricane Katrina. He left her a note on the morning of January 3, 2016, while she was sleeping, with instruction about where she could find his body.

Forgotston's friend, Garey Forster, a Republican former state representative from New Orleans who was the state labor secretary under former Governor Murphy J. Foster, Jr., said, "I don't know who will be the conscience of the stuff that's going on. He had the guts to say what others wouldn't say. And he always had his facts right. There are few souls like that." Columnist James Gill called Forgotston "The king of the subversive bloggers." Forgotston joked, "I don't just burn bridges, I blow them up."

Moon Griffon, on whose radio talk show Forgotston had been a regular guest, said that he hopes to preserve the Forgotston website for information for future users and researchers of Louisiana government.

In a message on the Forgotston website posted on January 12, 2016, E. J. Forgotston discusses her husband's clinical depression and the impossibility of finding the needed mix of medications in the last weeks of his life. She noted that his mother too had mental health issues which struck when C. B. was seven years of age. Elsa de Vries Forgotston had been in and out of institutions for most of her remaining life. E. J. Forgotston said that her husband feared that she would have had to care for him in his declining years. "He was not an unhappy person, as some people have suggested to me in recent days. No, he suffered from a mental illness that he could no longer control at the end," Mrs. Forgotston said.
