= Dunleith =

- U.S. National Register of Historic Places
- U.S. National Historic Landmark
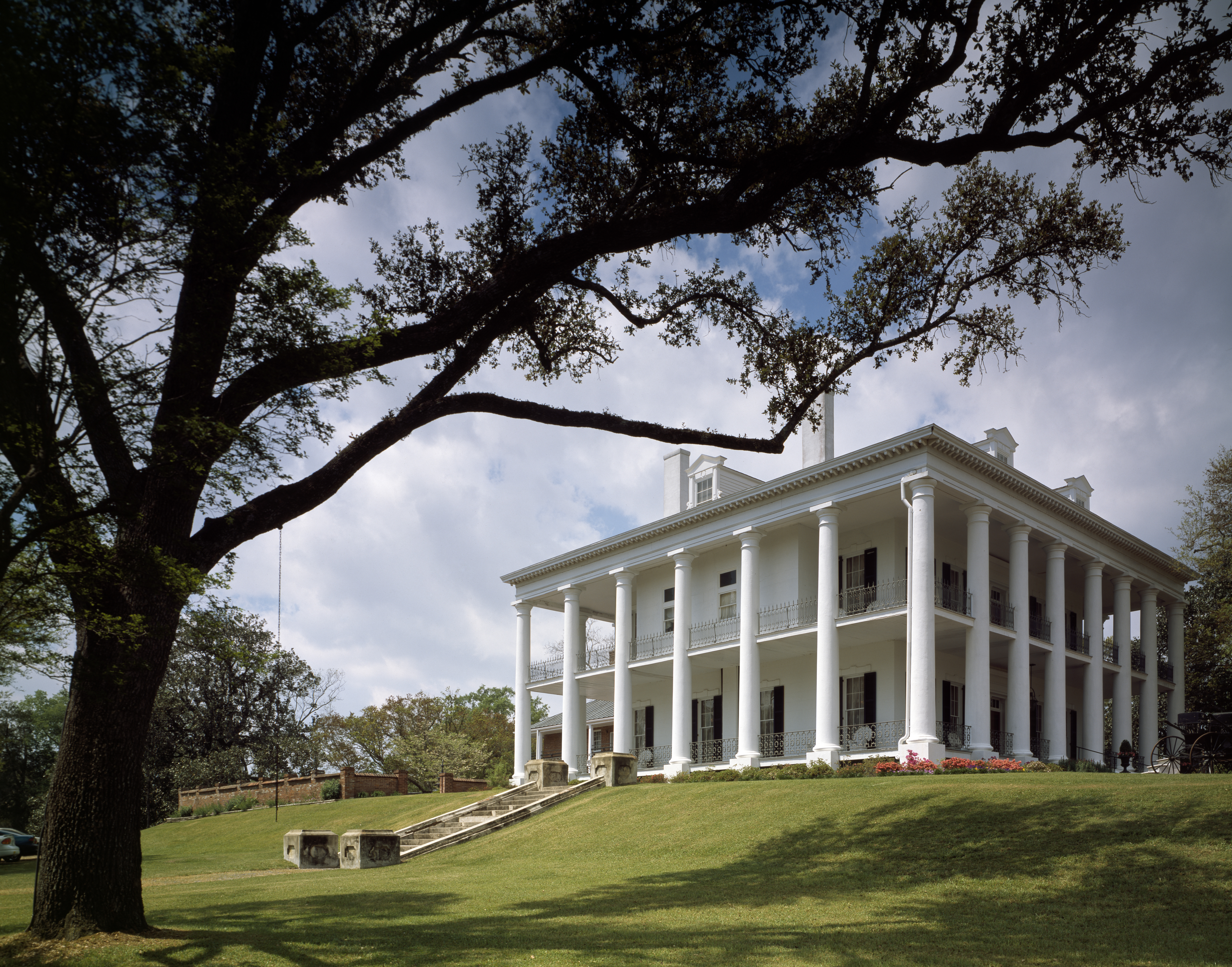

- Location within Mississippi Location within the United States
- Location: 84 Homochitto Street, Natchez, Mississippi
- Coordinates: 31°32′52″N 91°24′3″W
- Area: 40 acres (16 ha)
- Built: 1855
- Architectural style: Greek Revival
- NRHP reference No.: 72000684

Significant dates
- Added to NRHP: September 14, 1972
- Designated NHL: December 2, 1974

Dunleith is an antebellum mansion at 84 Homochitto Street in Natchez, Mississippi. Built about 1855, it is Mississippi's only surviving example of a plantation house with a fully encircling colonnade of Greek Revival columns, a form once seen much more frequently than today. Now an inn and conference center, it was designated a National Historic Landmark in 1974. Currently the original horse stable serves as a fine dining establishment with a traditional English pub in the lower levels of the structure.

== Description ==
The 12 room main house sits on 40 acres (16 ha) along with several outbuildings including a carriage house, a dairy barn, a poultry house, and a three-story brick courtyard building that historically would have housed the kitchen, laundry and slave quarters. The main house has a Greek Revival design and includes 26 Tuscan columns built of brick and stucco that completely encircle it. There are porches with distinctive wrought iron railings around the entire building on the first and second floor. The first floor includes windows similar to those in Monticello which would roll up to become doorways.

== History ==
The previous building on this plantation, called Routhland, had been built by Job Routh in the 1790s and passed down to his daughter Mary Routh. When it was struck by lightning and burned down in 1855, her husband, General Charles G. Dahlgren rebuilt, creating the present structure. It was sold for $30,000 in 1858 (equal to $1,116,346 today) to Alfred Vidal Davis who renamed it Dunleith.

The 1957 film, Raintree County was partly filmed at Dunleith, as was a portion of the 1974 version of Tom Sawyer and Huck Finn by Columbia Pictures, and an episode of Promised Land for CBS television in 1998.

Dunleith has been a historic house museum offering tours for hotel and restaurant guests as well as a historic inn since 1976, up until February 1, 2019, when was auctioned on the Adams County, Mississippi, courthouse steps due to bankruptcy. United Mississippi Bank, which held the loan on the property, took possession of it as there were no bids for the $4.7 million opening bid. It was used as a hotel, restaurant and event venue. The historic inn has 22 guest rooms divided amongst the main house, courtyard and dairy barn buildings. Multiple venue spaces accommodate a variety of purposes, including weddings, conferences, tour groups and reunions. The Castle Restaurant & Pub located in the former carriage house - constructed circa 1790 - serves breakfast, lunch and dinner.

Among its notable occupants was John Roy Lynch, born a slave at Tacony Plantation in Louisiana and self-educated, who would go on to become the first African-American Speaker of the House of Representatives in the Mississippi State Legislature and one of the first African-American U.S. Congressmen. He studied law, authored several articles and books, and would serve in several appointed political and military positions during a long career. After his death in Chicago 1939 at the age of 92, Lynch was buried with military honors in Arlington National Cemetery, due to his service as a Congressman and military officer.

== See also ==
- List of National Historic Landmarks in Mississippi
- National Register of Historic Places listings in Adams County, Mississippi
