= Charles G. Dahlgren =

American banker, Confederate general (1811–1888)

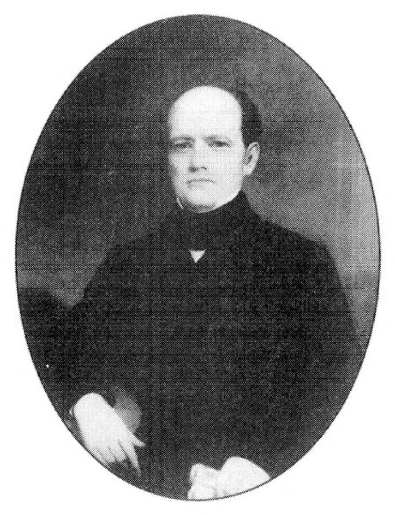
- A portrait of Charles G. Dahlgren by Washington Bogart Cooper
- Born: August 13, 1811; Philadelphia, Pennsylvania
- Died: December 18, 1888 (aged 77); Brooklyn, New York
- Burial place: City Cemetery, Natchez, Mississippi
- Military career
- Allegiance: United States of America; Confederate States of America
- Branch: United States Navy; Mississippi State Troops/Mississippi Militia
- Rank: Brigadier General (Mississippi State Troops/Mississippi Militia)
- Conflicts: American Civil War

Charles Gustavus Ulrich Dahlgren (August 13, 1811 – December 18, 1888) was a brigadier general of Mississippi State Troops (or Mississippi Militia) with allegiance to the Confederate States of America during the American Civil War. He commanded the 3rd Brigade of the Mississippi Militia, before a dispute with the President of the Confederate States of America, Jefferson Davis, over transfer of the state troops to the Confederate States Army cost him his career.

== Early life and career ==
Dahlgren was born in Philadelphia, Pennsylvania, the son of Bernhard Ulrik Dahlgren (1784-1824) and Martha (Rowan) Dahlgren (1789-1838). His father was a merchant and Swedish Consul stationed in Philadelphia. He briefly served in the United States Navy. His older brother was John A. Dahlgren, an admiral in the Union Navy. Union Army officer Col. Ulric Dahlgren, John's son, was his nephew. Charles Dahlgren moved to Louisiana, then to Mississippi, as a young man. According to a history of the mansions he constructed in the Natchez District, Dahlgren was an "intense and volatile character, a Pennsylvania native who mastered the banking trade with financier Nicholas Biddle. He was sent south to the booming new state of Mississippi in 1835, charged with overseeing a branch of the Bank of the United States." He married into the wealthy Routh family. He and his first wife, Mary Routh Ellis Dahlgren, built Dunleith, moving in the Greek Revival-style house in 1856. Mary Ellis Routh Dahlgren died in 1858, and Dahlgren remarried to Mary Vannoy, for whom he built Llangollen, which was a quasi-Italianate Victorian cottage that stood until a fire in 1932. As of 1860, Dahlgren "operated one of [Natchez's] largest plantation-supply firms while at the same time controlling 6,100 acres of cotton lands in Tensas Parish."

== Civil War service ==
Following Mississippi's passage of the ordinance of secession and the subsequent outbreak of the Civil War, Dahlgren raised two regiments of state-sponsored volunteer infantry (the 3rd and 7th Mississippi Infantry Regiments) by his own means. When his brigade (Brigade 3) was transferred from state service to the Provisional Army of the Confederate States, he lost his command. Dahlgren was known for a short temper and strong opinions, and strongly opposed this transfer. His outspoken opposition to the nationalization of his men cost him his command and sparked a feud with the family of Jefferson Davis that spanned from 1862 to 1906.

Charles Dahlgren came from a family that played a prominent role in the effort to defeat the Confederacy. His older brother, John A. Dahlgren, was a rear admiral in the U.S. Navy and enjoyed a measure of fame for inventing the Dahlgren gun. In 1864, John's son, Col. Ulric Dahlgren, died leading a failed Union cavalry raid with orders to assassinate Jefferson Davis and the Confederate Cabinet. Charles's other brother, William, spent part of the war in England spying on Confederate purchasing agents. In ironic contrast, Charles's compelling story evolves within the hierarchy of Southern aristocracy.

== Later life ==
After the Civil War, Dahlgren had lost his plantation and fortune and moved to New Orleans to practice law. Thereafter, he moved with his family to Nashville, Tennessee, for several months in 1870, then to Winchester, Virginia, and finally to New York City in 1876, where he worked as a lawyer and public accountant. He died at Brooklyn, New York, on December 18, 1888, and was buried in the City Cemetery, Natchez, Mississippi.

== See also ==
- List of American Civil War generals (Acting Confederate)
