= Llangollen (Natchez, Mississippi) =

Demolished antebellum mansion

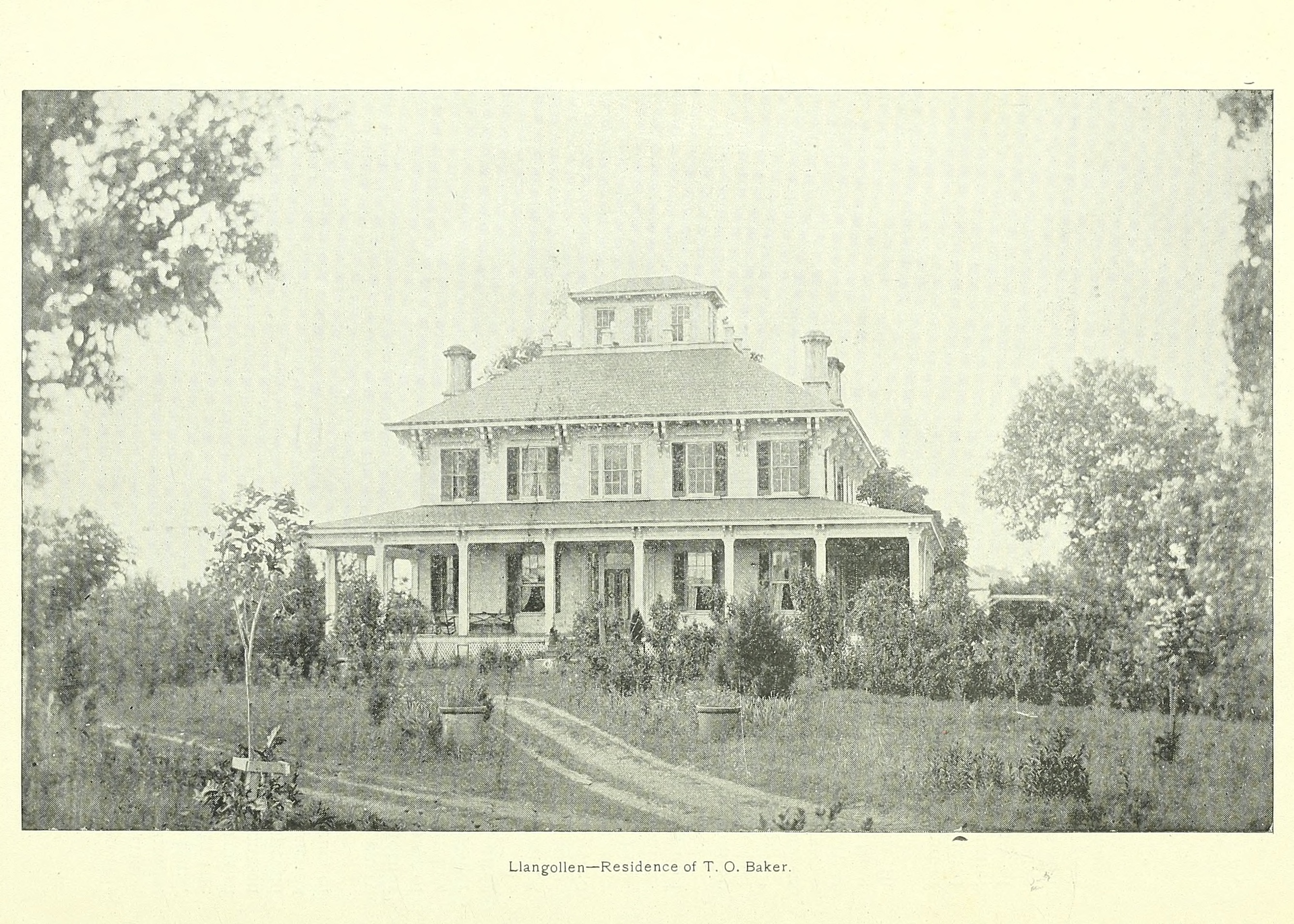
Llangollen (1897)

Llangollen was an Italianate Victorian mansion in Natchez, Mississippi, United States, built in 1858 by banker Charles G. Dahlgren for his second wife and children from a previous marriage. It was later owned by lawyer T. Otis Baker. Llangollen burned down in July 1932.
