= List of the oldest buildings in Mississippi =

This article attempts to list the oldest extant buildings in the state of Mississippi in the United States. Some dates are approximate and based upon dendochronology, architectural studies, and historical records. The area that is now Mississippi was originally inhabited by Native Americans. The city of Natchez was first established by French Colonists in 1716, and is one of the oldest and most historically important European settlements on the Mississippi River. The region was colonized and traded between French, Spanish, British, and American forces during the 1700s and a diverse architectural legacy remains visible in about ten surviving structures from that period.

To be listed here a building must:

- date to Mississippi statehood in 1817 or prior; or
- be the oldest building in a region, large city, or oldest of its type (government building, style, etc.)

== List ==
Building	Image	Location	First Built	Type	Notes
Mississippian Mounds, e.g. Emerald Mound site		Throughout state	800–1600	Earthen mounds	Though no original Native American buildings remain above ground, a number of constructed platform mounds have been preserved.
LaPointe-Krebs House		Pascagoula	1757	House/Military	The LaPointe-Krebs House is the oldest building in Mississippi, and the state's only surviving French Colonial structure. As one of the oldest structures on the Gulf coast of the United States, it currently operates as a museum open to the public and has recently undergone an extensive restoration.
Dog Trot House "Scotia"		Grand Gulf	1768	House	The oldest British Colonial structure in the state. It was originally located in a Scottish Highlander settlement of Scotia five miles south of Roxie in Franklin County, Mississippi. It was built by Thomas Foster and notably has wooden pegs instead of nails. It was donated to the Grand Gulf Military State Park in 1974.
King's Tavern		Natchez	1769–1789	Military	Traditionally considered the oldest British Colonial structure in the state, the second oldest building, and the oldest building in the city of Natchez. According to some scholars, the more likely date of construction is as late as 1798-1799.
Mount Locust		Stanton	1780	House/Inn	An early British home, plantation, and Inn built along the old Natchez trace. Operated as a museum by the National Park Service.
Hope Farm		Natchez	1780–1792	House	An early Natchez house that at one point served as the home of the Spanish commandant of Natchez District and colonial Governor of Spanish West Florida, Carlos de Grand Pré. He is believed to have built the house although it is contended that it was built before he purchased the property meaning it could be even older than believed. Later it was the home of Katherine Grafton Miller, the founder of the Natchez Pilgrimage. In March 2023, it suffered a fire that claimed the life of its longtime owner.
Richmond		Natchez	1784	House	An early Natchez house that was potentially built for Juan St. Germaine, an Indiana interpreter. The house was later notably owned by banker and planter Levin R Marshall who added two distinct additions to the original center section of the house.
Linden		Natchez	1785	House	An early Natchez home that was built for Alexander Moore . Later additions or alterations in 1815.
Springfield Plantation		Fayette	1786–1791	House	It is an early plantation house built for Virginian Thomas M. Green Jr. It is among, if not the oldest, masonry buildings in the state. It is also believed to be the site of Andrew Jackson's infamous first wedding to Rachel Robards (née Donelson).
Spanish House		Grand Gulf	1790	House	The oldest surviving of two remaining original buildings in the ghost town of Grand Gulf. It was restored in 1958 and is located in the Grand Gulf Military State Park.
Airlie		Natchez	1793	House	An early Natchez home built by planter Stephen Minor during the Spanish colonial period. Subsequent additions were made in the 1830s and 1850s.
Cottage Gardens		Natchez	1795	House	An early Natchez home built during the Spanish colonial period for Don José Vidal, a Spanish government official in Natchez and later Louisiana. He founded Vidalia, Louisiana across the Mississippi River from Natchez which was named after him in 1811.
House on Ellicott's Hill		Natchez	1798	House	An early Natchez home that was built for James Moore soon after American control was asserted in Natchez. It was the first house to be restored by the Natchez Garden Club in the 1930s. It is currently operated as a museum.
Texada		Natchez	1798–1805	House	An early Natchez home which is the oldest masonry building in the city. It was built by Manuel Garcia de Texada and in 1805 was listed as the most valuable building in the city.
Gloucester		Natchez	1803	House	An early Natchez home designed and built by Levi Weeks for David Williams. Mary McIntosh Williams later inherited the house. She was the wife of Winthrop Sargent who was the first Governor of the Mississippi Territory.
China Grove		Lorman	1804	House	An early plantation home with a log cabin at its core believed to have been built in 1804. It was built by Revolutionary War veteran Willis McDonald.
The Elms		Natchez	1804	House	An early Natchez home which was constructed by John Henderson, a native of Scotland. It subsequently served as a Presbyterian manse and residence.
Stutzman House		Woodville	1805	House	One of the oldest remaining buildings in Woodville which was the home of the French Stutzman family.
Mistletoe		Natchez	1807	House	This house was constructed for Peter Bisland, son of Scottish native John Bisland, as a wedding gift.
Meadvilla		Washington	1808	House	One of the oldest remaining buildings in the former town that was built as the home of Cowles Mead, a politician who notably served as the Mississippi Territory Secretary and Acting Governor.
Desert Plantation		Pinckneyville	1808-1812	House	An early Federal style plantation that was plantation was established by Robert Semple in 1808.
Ford House		Sandy Hook	1809	House	It is one of the oldest homes in the Pearl River Valley and was built by Reverend John Ford. It was the site of two early Mississippi Methodist Conferences (1814 and 1818). Bishop William McKendree and General Andrew Jackson also stayed at the house. It was also the site of the Pearl River Convention in 1816 which sent a delegate to Washington DC to advocate against splitting the Mississippi Territory (then containing modern-day Mississippi and Alabama) in two.
Woodville Baptist Church		Woodville	1809	Church	Believed to be the oldest church building in the state.
Port Gibson Reveille Building		Port Gibson	1810	Commercial	An early Federal style commercial building. Part of the Market Street-Suburb Ste. Mary Historic District.
Miss Phoebe's House		Port Gibson	1811	House	An early house in Port Gibson. Part of the Market Street-Suburb Ste. Mary Historic District.
Salisbury Plantation		Woodville	1811	House	An early plantation house that is believed to have been built by Captain Moses Hook. It is named in honor of his home county Salisbury Township in Massachusetts.
Selma Plantation		Natchez	1811	House	An early Natchez home that was built for Gerard Chittocque Brandon. His son, Gerard Brandon, was a Mississippi governor.
Auburn		Natchez	1812	House	A mansion designed and built by Levi Weeks for Lyman Harding, the first Attorney General of Mississippi. It was subsequently owned by the Duncan family from 1820-1911 when it was sold to the city.
Blantonia Plantation		Lorman	1812	House	An early plantation house built for John Blanton.
Glenfield Plantation		Natchez	1812	House	The original portion of this Natchez plantation is believed to have been built around 1812. The property that the house sits on was owned by the Monsanto family for a time.
Holly Grove		Centreville	1812	House	An early Federal style plantation that was established by Duncan Stewart, a man from North Carolina.
Woodlawn		Rodney	1813	House	Woodlawn was the owner's residence on Woodlawn Plantation - built for David Hunt. It was his home plantation from which he ran one of the largest plantation empires before the Civil War
Rosemont		Woodville	1814	House	It is also known as Poplar Grove or the Hale House. It was built for the parents of Jefferson Davis and was his boyhood home.
White Cottage		Natchez	1814	House	Also known as Twin Oaks, this house is believed to have been built around 1814.
Routhland		Natchez	1815	House	Construction on this early house was begun around 1815 for John Routh and was the second house in Natchez to bear that name. The Routh family was one of the wealthiest in Mississippi. It was later owned by Charles Clark a Mississippi Governor and soldier.
617 Market Street		Port Gibson	1815	Commercial	An early Federal style commercial building. Part of the Market Street-Suburb Ste. Mary Historic District.
623 Market Street		Port Gibson	1815	Commercial	An early Federal style commercial building. Part of the Market Street-Suburb Ste. Mary Historic District.
710 Market Street		Port Gibson	1815	Commercial	An early Federal style commercial building. Its second story was removed after a 1968 fire. Part of the Market Street-Suburb Ste. Mary Historic District.
Smithland		Kingston	1815–1817	House	An early home that was built for Benijah Smith. It is the only remaining Federal-style building in the settlement of Kingston.
Myrtle Bank		Natchez	1816	House	A home built for George Overaker prior to 1817. In 1835 Alfred and Eliza Cochran expanded the house to its present size and form after purchasing it.
Pecan Grove		Church Hill	1816	House	An early plantation house built by Thomas Baker, a man from New Jersey.
Englesing Home		Port Gibson	1817	House	An early home that is claimed by some to be the birthplace of Constance Cary. Part of the Market Street-Suburb Ste. Mary Historic District.
Planter's Hotel		Port Gibson	1817	Hotel	An early Federal-style hotel. Part of the Market Street-Suburb Ste. Mary Historic District.
The Cedars		Columbus	1818	House	The oldest known building in Columbus.
Rodney Presbyterian Church		Rodney	1832	Church	
Old Mississippi State Capitol		Jackson	1839	Capitol	The oldest known building in Jackson.
Temple Gemiluth Chassed		Port Gibson	1892	Synagogue	The oldest remaining synagogue in the state.

== See also ==
- List of the oldest buildings in the United States
- History of Mississippi
- List of the oldest buildings in Alabama
- List of the oldest buildings in Florida
- List of the oldest buildings in Louisiana
- List of the oldest buildings in Tennessee
- Timeline of architectural styles
- List of National Historic Landmarks in Mississippi
- National Register of Historic Places listings in Mississippi
- List of Mississippi Landmarks
