= National Register of Historic Places listings in Adams County, Mississippi =

Location of Adams County in Mississippi

This is a list of the National Register of Historic Places listings in Adams County, Mississippi.

This is intended to be a complete list of the properties and districts on the National Register of Historic Places in Adams County, Mississippi, United States. Latitude and longitude coordinates are provided for many National Register properties and districts; these locations may be seen together in a map.

There are 125 properties and districts listed on the National Register in the county, including 13 National Historic Landmarks. Another 2 properties were once listed but have been removed.

This National Park Service list is complete through NPS recent listings posted October 23, 2026.

== Current listings ==
	Name on the Register	Image	Date listed	Location	City or town	Description
1	William Ailes House		March 12, 1980 (#80002190)	657 S. Canal St. 31°33′08″N 91°24′40″W	Natchez	
2	Airlie	Airlie	October 29, 1982 (#82000566)	9 Elm St. 31°34′09″N 91°23′40″W	Natchez	
3	Anna Site	Anna Site	September 14, 1993 (#93001606)	10 miles (16 km) north of Natchez; 31°41′43″N 91°20′59″W	Natchez	A Plaquemine culture archeological site that is a U.S. National Historic Landmark
4	Arlington	Arlington	December 12, 1973 (#73000999)	Main St. 31°33′10″N 91°23′33″W	Natchez	
5	Assembly Hall	Assembly Hall	April 19, 1978 (#78001587)	Assembly and Main Sts. 31°34′44″N 91°17′54″W	Washington	
6	Auburn	Auburn	May 30, 1974 (#74001047)	Duncan Park; 31°32′42″N 91°23′33″W	Natchez	
7	John Baynton House	John Baynton House	October 16, 1974 (#74001048)	821 Main St. 31°33′24″N 91°23′53″W	Natchez	
8	Bedford Plantation		November 16, 1978 (#78001576)	Northeast of Natchez off U.S. Route 61; 31°37′00″N 91°11′52″W	Natchez	
9	Beechland		November 4, 1982 (#82000567)	South of Natchez off U.S. Route 61; 31°23′41″N 91°19′11″W	Natchez	
10	Belvidere		April 8, 1980 (#80002191)	70 Homochitto St. 31°33′03″N 91°24′01″W	Natchez	
11	Beulah Missionary Baptist Church		December 12, 2023 (#100009623)	710 Beulah Street; 31°33′46″N 91°23′45″W	Natchez	
12	Brandon Hall	Brandon Hall	June 12, 1980 (#80002198)	Northeast of Washington on U.S. Route 61; 31°36′53″N 91°15′10″W	Washington	
13	Gerard Brandon IV House	Gerard Brandon IV House	March 19, 1982 (#82003094)	708 N Union St. 31°33′53″N 91°23′48″W	Natchez	
14	Briars	Briars	August 24, 1977 (#77000778)	Southwest of Natchez; 31°33′06″N 91°25′10″W	Natchez	
15	Brumfield High School	Brumfield High School	October 21, 1993 (#93001139)	100 St. Catherine St. 31°33′26″N 91°23′33″W	Natchez	
16	Buie House		July 13, 1983 (#83000948)	Northeast of Natchez; 31°38′06″N 91°16′13″W	Natchez	
17	The Burn	The Burn	July 3, 1979 (#79001280)	307 Oak St. 31°33′55″N 91°23′46″W	Natchez	
18	Carmel Presbyterian Church		October 31, 1985 (#85003441)	Carmel Church Rd. 31°25′53″N 91°19′34″W	Natchez	
19	Cedar Grove		March 19, 1982 (#82003088)	Southeast of Natchez; 31°25′44″N 91°17′42″W	Natchez	
20	Cemetery Bluff District	Cemetery Bluff District	October 24, 1980 (#80002192)	Cemetery Rd. 31°34′37″N 91°23′39″W	Natchez	
21	Cherry Grove Plantation	Cherry Grove Plantation	March 31, 1983 (#83000949)	South of Natchez off Kingston Rd. 31°27′55″N 91°21′03″W	Natchez	
22	China Grove Plantation		April 7, 1982 (#82003089)	South of Natchez; 31°24′54″N 91°22′49″W	Natchez	
23	Cliffs Plantation		September 18, 1980 (#80002193)	South of Natchez; 31°27′39″N 91°24′56″W	Natchez	
24	Clifton Heights Historic District	Clifton Heights Historic District	November 12, 1982 (#82000568)	Roughly bounded by Ridge and Mulberry Alley, Natchez Bluff, Park Ave., and Maple St. 31°34′07″N 91°24′00″W	Natchez	
25	Commercial Bank and Banker's House	Commercial Bank and Banker's House	May 30, 1974 (#74002252)	206 Main St. and 107 Canal St. 31°33′39″N 91°24′18″W	Natchez	
26	Concord Quarters	Concord Quarters	January 24, 2019 (#100003342)	301 Gayosa St. 31°33′52″N 91°22′56″W	Natchez	Former slaves quarters.
27	Cottage Gardens	Cottage Gardens	July 5, 1979 (#79001281)	816 Myrtle Ave. 31°34′08″N 91°23′43″W	Natchez	
28	D'Evereux	D'Evereux	January 13, 1972 (#72000683)	D'Evereaux Dr. 31°33′20″N 91°22′40″W	Natchez	
29	John Dicks House	John Dicks House	March 25, 1982 (#82003090)	802 N. Union St. 31°33′57″N 91°23′41″W	Natchez	
30	Dixon Building	Dixon Building	May 30, 1979 (#79001282)	514 Main St. 31°33′33″N 91°24′08″W	Natchez	
31	Downriver Residential Historic District	Downriver Residential Historic District	March 25, 1999 (#99000385)	Roughly bounded by S. Canal St., Orleans St., the Illinois Central railroad tracks, and the bayou between Union and Rankin Sts. 31°33′18″N 91°24′25″W	Natchez	
32	Dr. Charles H. Dubs Townhouse	Dr. Charles H. Dubs Townhouse	May 5, 1978 (#78001577)	311 N. Pearl St. 31°33′44″N 91°24′02″W	Natchez	
33	Dunleith	Dunleith	September 14, 1972 (#72000684)	84 Homochitto St. 31°32′52″N 91°24′03″W	Natchez	
34	Edgewood	Edgewood	March 30, 1979 (#79001283)	North of Natchez on Mississippi Highway 554; 31°38′01″N 91°20′18″W	Natchez	
35	Elgin		January 19, 1979 (#79001284)	South of Natchez off U.S. Route 61; 31°29′01″N 91°22′56″W	Natchez	
36	Elizabeth Female Academy Site (No. 101-3X)	Elizabeth Female Academy Site (No. 101-3X)	May 6, 1977 (#77000109)	East of Natchez on U.S. Routes 84/98; 31°34′30″N 91°17′36″W	Natchez	Ruins of the defunct Elizabeth Female Academy.
37	Elms Court	Elms Court	December 2, 1977 (#77000780)	42 John R. Junkin Dr. 31°31′52″N 91°23′42″W	Natchez	
38	The Elms	The Elms	November 7, 1976 (#76001083)	215 S. Pine St. 31°33′20″N 91°23′48″W	Natchez	
39	Emerald Mound Site (22AD504)	Emerald Mound Site (22AD504)	November 18, 1988 (#88002618)	10 miles northeast of Natchez, off the Natchez Trace Parkway; 31°38′10″N 91°14′50″W	Stanton	
40	Eola Hotel	Eola Hotel	January 11, 1979 (#79001285)	Main and Pearl Sts. 31°33′38″N 91°24′11″W	Natchez	
41	Fair Oaks		November 13, 1976 (#76001084)	South of Natchez on U.S. Route 61; 31°27′00″N 91°23′03″W	Natchez	
42	Fairchild's Creek Bridge		June 8, 2005 (#05000562)	County Road 555; 31°43′31″N 91°18′49″W	Natchez	
43	First Presbyterian Church of Natchez	First Presbyterian Church of Natchez	December 22, 1978 (#78001578)	117 S. Pearl St. 31°33′32″N 91°24′13″W	Natchez	
44	Fort Dearborn Site		September 17, 1974 (#74001054)	North of Washington off U.S. Route 61; 31°35′14″N 91°17′40″W	Washington	
45	Foster's Mound	Foster's Mound	September 2, 1982 (#82003091)	Northeast of Natchez off U.S. Route 61; 31°35′58″N 91°19′39″W	Natchez	
46	Glen Aubin		August 29, 1985 (#85001930)	Off U.S. Route 61; 31°23′04″N 91°26′12″W	Natchez	
47	Glen Mary Plantation and Tenant House		July 6, 1979 (#79003380)	Foster Mound Rd. 31°35′41″N 91°19′38″W	Natchez	
48	Glenburnie		December 19, 1978 (#78001579)	551 John R. Junkin Dr. 31°32′08″N 91°23′33″W	Natchez	
49	Glencannon	Glencannon	February 8, 1990 (#89002322)	Junction of Providence Rd. and Gov. Fleet Rd. 31°32′30″N 91°25′00″W	Natchez	Also known as Glencannon
50	Gloucester	Gloucester	November 7, 1976 (#76001085)	South of Natchez on Lower Woodville Rd. 31°31′54″N 91°24′07″W	Natchez	
51	Grand Village of the Natchez Indians	Grand Village of the Natchez Indians	October 15, 1966 (#66000408)	3 miles southeast of Natchez; 31°31′25″N 91°22′46″W	Natchez	
52	Hawthorne Place		July 3, 1979 (#79001286)	Lower Woodville Rd. 31°32′18″N 91°24′04″W	Natchez	
53	Wharlest and Exerlena Jackson House		June 5, 2017 (#100001027)	13 Matthews St. 31°34′05″N 91°23′22″W	Natchez	Former home of Wharlest Jackson, a local civil rights activist who was assassinated in 1967.
54	Henderson-Britton House	Henderson-Britton House	June 9, 1978 (#78001580)	215 S. Pearl St. 31°33′30″N 91°24′15″W	Natchez	
55	Hillside		September 15, 1987 (#87000617)	Hutchins Landing Rd. 31°29′47″N 91°16′54″W	Natchez	
56	Holy Family Catholic Church Historic District	Holy Family Catholic Church Historic District	July 14, 1995 (#95000855)	Roughly along Aldrich, Old D'Evereux, St. Catherine, Abbott, and Byrne Sts. 31°33′34″N 91°23′46″W	Natchez	
57	Hope Farm	Hope Farm	August 22, 1975 (#75001037)	147 Homochitto St. 31°32′42″N 91°23′48″W	Natchez	
58	House on Ellicott's Hill	House on Ellicott's Hill	May 30, 1974 (#74001050)	N. Canal and Jefferson Sts. 31°33′45″N 91°24′13″W	Natchez	
59	Institute Hall	Institute Hall	June 20, 1979 (#79001287)	111 S. Pearl St. 31°33′34″N 91°24′12″W	Natchez	
60	Jefferson College	Jefferson College	August 25, 1970 (#70000316)	North St. 31°34′52″N 91°18′01″W	Washington	
61	William Johnson House	William Johnson House	June 16, 1976 (#76001086)	210 State St. 31°33′34″N 91°23′29″W	Natchez	
62	Keyhole House		March 25, 1982 (#82003092)	1016 Main St. 31°33′43″N 91°23′46″W	Natchez	
63	King's Tavern	King's Tavern	May 6, 1971 (#71000444)	611 Jefferson St. 31°33′38″N 91°23′57″W	Natchez	
64	Kingston Methodist Church	Kingston Methodist Church	May 13, 1982 (#82003093)	Southeast of Natchez; 31°23′21″N 91°16′43″W	Natchez	
65	Koontz House	Koontz House	March 29, 1979 (#79001288)	303 S. Rankin St. 31°33′21″N 91°24′07″W	Natchez	
66	Lansdowne	Lansdowne	July 24, 1978 (#78001581)	North of Natchez on Pine Ridge Rd. 31°35′04″N 91°21′47″W	Natchez	Antebellum planter's mansion
67	Laurel Hill Plantation		October 26, 1982 (#82000569)	South of Natchez off U.S. Route 61; 31°25′20″N 91°24′35″W	Natchez	
68	Linden	Linden	September 1, 1978 (#78001582)	1 Linden Pl. 31°33′04″N 91°23′01″W	Natchez	
69	Lisle-Shields Town House		March 29, 1979 (#79001289)	701 N. Union St. 31°33′50″N 91°23′47″W	Natchez	
70	Longwood	Longwood	December 16, 1969 (#69000079)	1.5 miles southeast of Natchez; 31°32′12″N 91°24′17″W	Natchez	Octagonal, unfinished antebellum mansion, known also as Nutt's Folly
71	Magnolia Hill		March 30, 1979 (#79001290)	Southeast of Natchez; 31°26′40″N 91°16′40″W	Natchez	
72	The Manse	The Manse	March 7, 1979 (#79001291)	307 S. Rankin St. 31°33′20″N 91°24′09″W	Natchez	
73	Mazique Archeological Site	Mazique Archeological Site	October 23, 1991 (#91001529)	Address restricted	Natchez	
74	Meadvilla		November 17, 1982 (#82000570)	Address restricted	Washington	
75	Melrose	Melrose	May 30, 1974 (#74002253)	Melrose Ave. 31°32′32″N 91°22′56″W	Natchez	
76	Mercer House		August 9, 1979 (#79001292)	118 S. Wall St. 31°33′37″N 91°24′18″W	Natchez	
77	Mistletoe		October 10, 1973 (#73001000)	Northeast of Natchez on Mississippi Highway 554; 31°37′31″N 91°19′00″W	Natchez	
78	Monmouth	Monmouth	April 26, 1973 (#73001001)	E. Franklin St. and Melrose Ave. 31°33′38″N 91°23′10″W	Natchez	
79	Montaigne	Montaigne	December 11, 1974 (#74001052)	Liberty Rd. 31°33′01″N 91°22′46″W	Natchez	
80	Montpellier	Montpellier	December 18, 1979 (#79001293)	Southeast of Natchez on Mississippi Highway 551; 31°32′08″N 91°21′03″W	Natchez	
81	Mount Olive		November 28, 1980 (#80002194)	Northeast of Natchez; 31°37′14″N 91°20′27″W	Natchez	
82	Mount Repose	Mount Repose	June 19, 1979 (#79001294)	North of Natchez on Mississippi Highway 555; 31°38′12″N 91°20′40″W	Natchez	
83	Myrtle Bank	Myrtle Bank	December 22, 1978 (#78001583)	408 N. Pearl St. 31°33′48″N 91°24′02″W	Natchez	
84	Natchez On-Top-of-the-Hill Historic District	Natchez On-Top-of-the-Hill Historic District	September 17, 1979 (#79003381)	U.S. Routes 61, 84, and 98; 31°33′34″N 91°24′09″W	Natchez	
85	Natchez Bluffs and Under-the-Hill Historic District	Natchez Bluffs and Under-the-Hill Historic District	April 11, 1972 (#72000685)	Bounded by S. Canal St., Broadway, and Mississippi River; 31°33′32″N 91°25′36″W	Natchez	
86	Natchez National Cemetery	Natchez National Cemetery	November 22, 1999 (#99001387)	41 Cemetery Rd. 31°34′51″N 91°23′42″W	Natchez	
87	Natchez National Historical Park	Natchez National Historical Park	October 7, 1988 (#01000276)	PO Box 1208; 31°32′36″N 91°22′59″W	Natchez	
88	Neibert-Fisk House	Neibert-Fisk House	January 22, 1979 (#79001295)	310 N. Wall St. 31°33′48″N 91°24′07″W	Natchez	
89	Oakland	Oakland	October 21, 1976 (#76001087)	9 Oakhurst Dr. 31°33′00″N 91°22′30″W	Natchez	
90	Oakland		June 29, 1989 (#89000781)	Lower Woodville Rd. 31°24′42″N 91°24′21″W	Natchez	
91	Oakwood		May 9, 1985 (#85000968)	Off Kingston Rd. 31°25′01″N 91°16′28″W	Natchez	
92	Charles Patterson House		June 24, 1994 (#94000645)	506 S. Union St. 31°33′17″N 91°24′20″W	Natchez	
93	Pine Ridge Church	Pine Ridge Church	December 13, 1979 (#79001296)	Northeast of Natchez at Pine Ridge Rd. and Mississippi Highway 554; 31°37′51″N 91°20′57″W	Natchez	
94	Pleasant Hill	Pleasant Hill	March 28, 1979 (#79001297)	310 Pearl St. 31°33′28″N 91°24′20″W	Natchez	
95	Prentiss Club	Prentiss Club	April 17, 1979 (#79001298)	Pearl and Jefferson Sts. 31°33′42″N 91°24′06″W	Natchez	
96	Propinquity		July 26, 2023 (#100008884)	48 Powlett Rd. 31°35′17″N 91°17′08″W	Natchez vicinity	
97	Ratcliffe Mound Site		December 30, 2004 (#04001406)	Address restricted	Washington	
98	Ravenna		November 4, 1982 (#82004975)	601 S. Union St. 31°33′12″N 91°24′19″W	Natchez	
99	Ravennaside	Ravennaside	July 5, 1979 (#79001299)	601 S. Union St. 31°32′47″N 91°24′33″W	Natchez	
100	Richmond	Richmond	November 16, 1978 (#78001584)	Government Fleet Rd. 31°32′47″N 91°24′33″W	Natchez	
101	Roos House		November 8, 1979 (#79001300)	208 Linton Ave. 31°34′08″N 91°23′57″W	Natchez	
102	Rosalie	Rosalie	August 16, 1977 (#77000781)	100 Orleans St. 31°33′32″N 91°24′30″W	Natchez	
103	Rose Hill Missionary Baptist Church		December 12, 2023 (#100009625)	607½ Madison Street; 31°33′46″N 91°23′51″W	Natchez	
104	Routhland		August 22, 1977 (#77000782)	92 Winchester Rd. 31°33′04″N 91°23′42″W	Natchez	
105	Saragossa	Saragossa	November 24, 1980 (#80002196)	South of Natchez on Saragossa Rd. 31°29′30″N 91°24′06″W	Natchez	
106	Selma Plantation House	Selma Plantation House	June 15, 1989 (#89000207)	467 Selma Rd. 31°36′01″N 91°16′12″W	Natchez	
107	Shadyside		March 29, 1979 (#79001301)	107 Shadyside St. 31°33′49″N 91°23′27″W	Natchez	
108	Shaw-Nosser House		December 14, 2023 (#100009624)	207 Linton Avenue; 31°34′00″N 91°24′03″W	Natchez	
109	Smart-Griffin House		May 18, 1979 (#79001302)	180 St. Catherine St. 31°33′22″N 91°23′15″W	Natchez	
110	Smith-Bontura-Evans House	Smith-Bontura-Evans House	March 29, 1978 (#78001585)	107 Broadway St. 31°33′40″N 91°24′22″W	Natchez	
111	Smithland		April 2, 1987 (#87000575)	1 mile south of Kingston-Hutchins Rd. 31°23′03″N 91°21′13″W	Natchez	
112	Spokane Mound Archaeological Site		July 15, 2022 (#100007425)	Address restricted	Natchez vicinity	
113	Stanton Hall	Stanton Hall	May 30, 1974 (#74002254)	High St. between Pearl and Commerce Sts. 31°33′45″N 91°24′01″W	Natchez	
114	Texada House and Quarters	Texada House and Quarters	April 17, 1979 (#79001303)	222 S. Wall St. 31°33′23″N 91°24′06″W	Natchez	Renamed (from "Texada Tavern") and boundary increased on January 26, 2026.
115	Tillman House	Tillman House	April 17, 1979 (#79001304)	506 High St. 31°33′42″N 91°24′00″W	Natchez	
116	Traveller's Rest	Traveller's Rest	May 3, 1984 (#84002110)	Address restricted	Natchez	
117	Upriver Residential District		December 1, 1983 (#83004371)	Roughly bounded by Pine, Monroe, Elm-Bishop, and Ridge-Maple Sts. 31°34′00″N 91°23′49″W	Natchez	
118	Van Court Town House	Van Court Town House	July 9, 1980 (#80004474)	510 Washington St. 31°33′25″N 91°24′28″W	Natchez	
119	Warren-Erwin House		March 19, 1982 (#82003095)	Palestine Rd. 31°33′26″N 91°17′53″W	Washington	
120	Washington Methodist Church	Washington Methodist Church	September 4, 1986 (#86002168)	Main and Church Sts. 31°34′41″N 91°18′08″W	Washington	
121	Weymouth Hall	Weymouth Hall	March 12, 1980 (#80002197)	1 Cemetery Rd. 31°34′30″N 91°23′38″W	Natchez	
122	White Cottage		October 13, 1983 (#83003937)	71 Homochitto St. 31°33′02″N 91°23′19″W	Natchez	
123	Winchester House		January 31, 1979 (#79001305)	816 Main St. 31°33′25″N 91°23′55″W	Natchez	
124	Woodlawn Historic District		November 7, 1995 (#95001250)	Roughly bounded by Martin Luther King St., E. Stiers and Old College Lns., and Elm and Bishop Sts. 31°34′03″N 91°23′24″W	Natchez	
125	Woodstock		June 29, 1989 (#89000782)	Carmel Church Rd., 12 miles southeast of Natchez; 31°25′33″N 91°19′30″W	Natchez	

== Former listings ==
	Name on the Register	Image	Date listed	Date removed	Location	City or town	Description
1	Patrick Murphy House		April 9, 1980 (#80002195)	July 25, 1997	21 Irvine Lane	Natchez	Destroyed by fire in 1993
2	U.S. Marine Hospital	U.S. Marine Hospital	November 29, 1978 (#78001586)	May 15, 1987	801 Maple St.	Natchez	Destroyed by fire on August 4, 1984

== See also ==
- List of National Historic Landmarks in Mississippi
- National Register of Historic Places listings in Mississippi
