= Glenburnie =

Glenburnie may refer to:

in Australia

- Glenburnie, South Australia, an eastern suburb of Mount Gambier, Australia

in Canada

- Glenburnie, Ontario
- Glenburnie-Birchy Head-Shoal Brook, Newfoundland and Labrador, a town

in the United States

- Glenburnie (Natchez, Mississippi), listed on the NRHP in Adams County, Mississippi
- A hamlet in Putnam, New York
- Glenburnie (Shenandoah Junction, West Virginia), NRHP-listed, in Jefferson County
