= Roos House =

Roos House may refer to:

in the United States

- Roos House (San Francisco) in San Francisco, California; NRHP-listed
- Munch-Roos House in Taylors Falls, Minnesota; NRHP-listed
- Roos House (Natchez, Mississippi) in Natchez, Mississippi; NRHP-listed
