= Hillside (Natchez, Mississippi) =

Historic house in Mississippi, United States

- U.S. National Register of Historic Places
- Location within Mississippi Location within the United States
- Nearest city: Natchez, Mississippi
- Area: 12 acres (4.9 ha)
- Built: 1855
- Architectural style: Greek Revival, Vernacular Greek Revival
- NRHP reference No.: 87000617
- Added to NRHP: September 15, 1987

Hillside is a historic house in Natchez, Mississippi, USA. It was built in the 1850s for Mrs. Jeremiah Cory, her daughter and her son-in-law, W. G. Foules. It has been listed on the National Register of Historic Places since September 15, 1987.
