= White Cottage =

White Cottage may refer to:

- White Cottage, California, now Howell Mountain, an unincorporated community
- White Cottage (Natchez, Mississippi), a historic house
- White Cottage, Ohio, an unincorporated community
