= Buie House =

Historic house in Mississippi, United States

- U.S. National Register of Historic Places
- Location within Mississippi Location within the United States
- Nearest city: Natchez, Mississippi
- Coordinates: 31°38′6″N 91°16′13″W
- Area: 1.4 acres (0.57 ha)
- Built: 1855
- Architectural style: Greek Revival
- NRHP reference No.: 83000948
- Added to NRHP: July 13, 1983

Buie House is a historic house in Natchez, Mississippi, USA. It was built circa 1855. It has been listed on the National Register of Historic Places since July 13, 1983.
