= Mount Repose (Natchez, Mississippi) =

Historic house in Mississippi, United States

- U.S. National Register of Historic Places
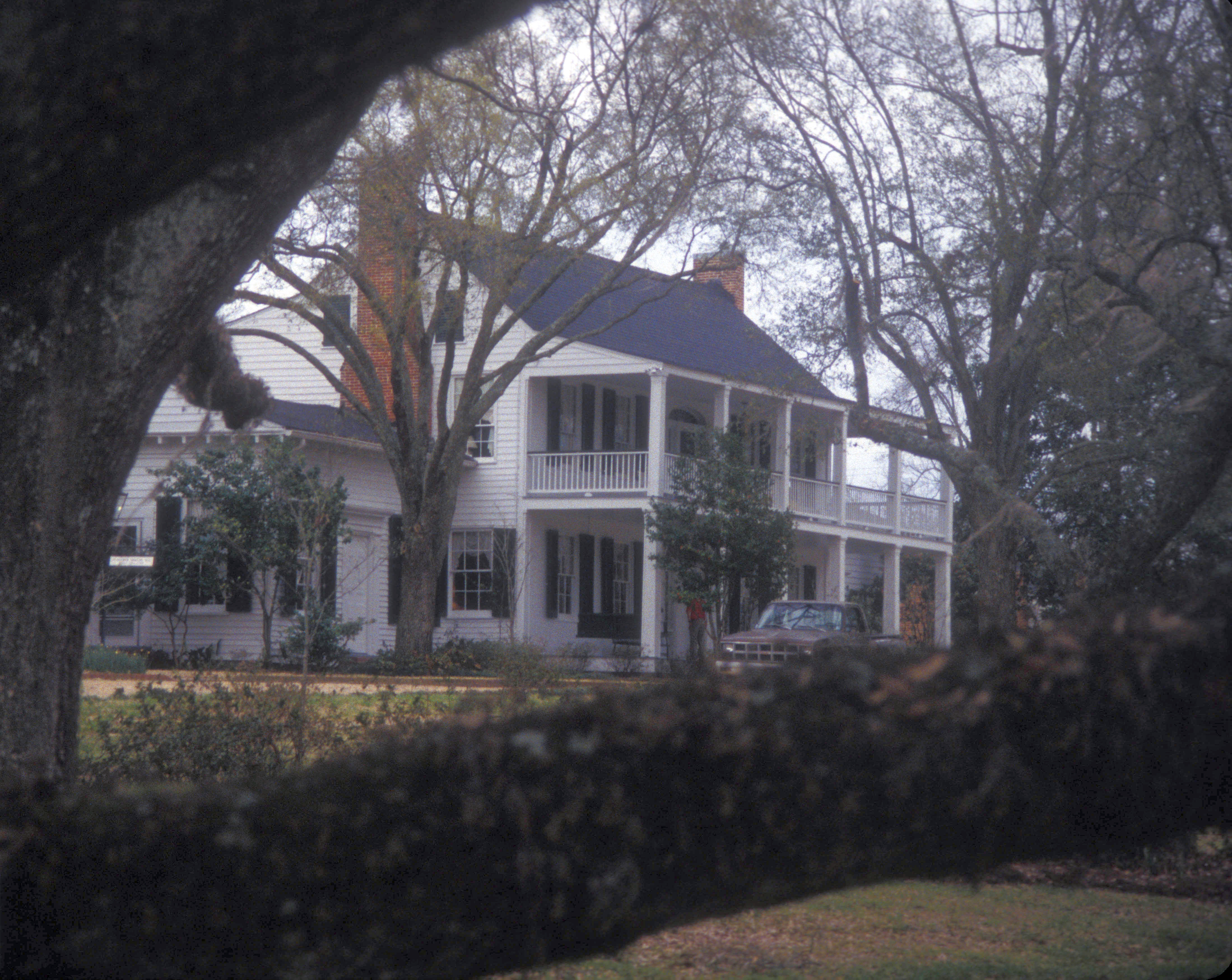
- Interactive map of Mount Repose
- Nearest city: Natchez, Mississippi
- Coordinates: 31°38′9.34″N 91°20′40.42″W
- Area: 242 acres (98 ha)
- Built: 1824
- NRHP reference No.: 79001294
- Added to NRHP: June 19, 1979

Mount Repose is a historic mansion in Pine Ridge, Adams County near Natchez, Mississippi, USA. Mount Repose was one of the girlhood homes of Elizabeth Bisland, the "Cosmopolitan" magazine correspondent who raced Nellie Bly, the reporter for the "World" newspaper, around the world in 1889 - 1890.

== History ==
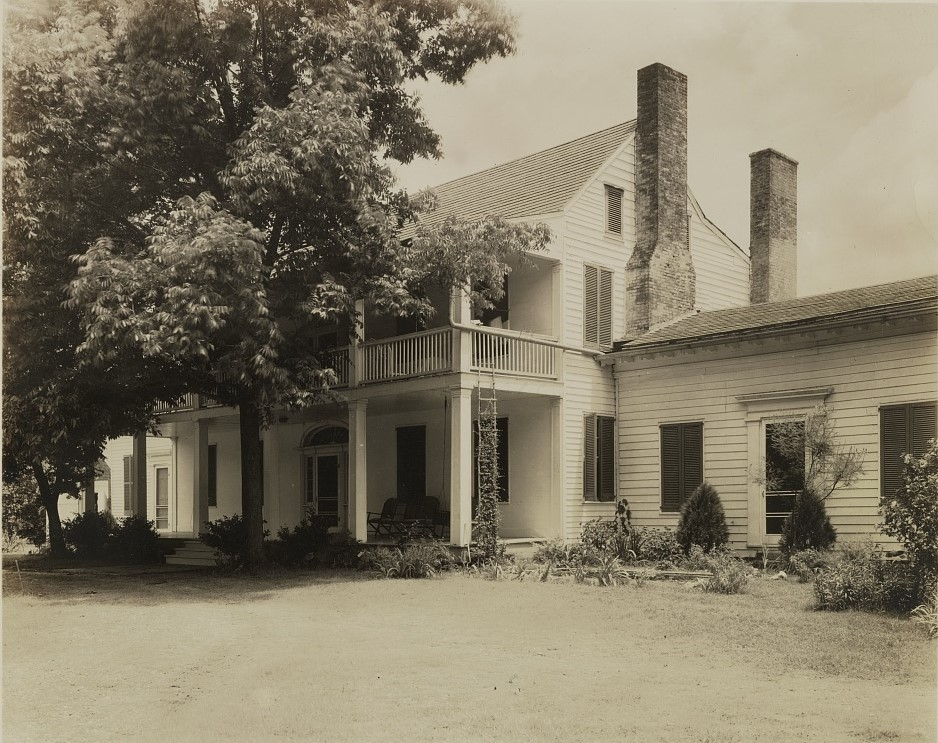
Mount Repose, by Frances Benjamin Johnston, 1938

Mount Repose was built in 1824 for William Bisland, on lands granted his father, John Bisland, by Spanish Crown in 1782. William's elder brother Peter built Mistletoe. It has been listed on the National Register of Historic Places since June 19, 1979.
