= Glenburnie (Natchez, Mississippi) =

Historic house in Mississippi, United States

- U.S. National Register of Historic Places
- Location within Mississippi Location within the United States
- Location: 551 John R. Junkin Dr., Natchez, Mississippi
- Coordinates: 31°32′8″N 91°23′33″W
- Area: 4.7 acres (1.9 ha)
- Built: 1833
- Architectural style: Colonial Revival, Federal
- NRHP reference No.: 78001579
- Added to NRHP: December 19, 1978

Glenburnie is a historic mansion in Natchez, Mississippi.

== Location ==
It is located at 551 John R. Junkin Dr. in Natchez, Mississippi. It is next door to Elms Court.

== History ==
The mansion was built in 1833 on land granted to Adam Lewis Bingaman (1790-1869) in 1798 by Sturges Sprague, an attorney. From 1901 to 1904, H.G. Bulky extended it in the Classical Colonial style.

It has been listed on the National Register of Historic Places since December 19, 1978.
