= Tillman House =

Historic house in Mississippi, United States

- U.S. National Register of Historic Places
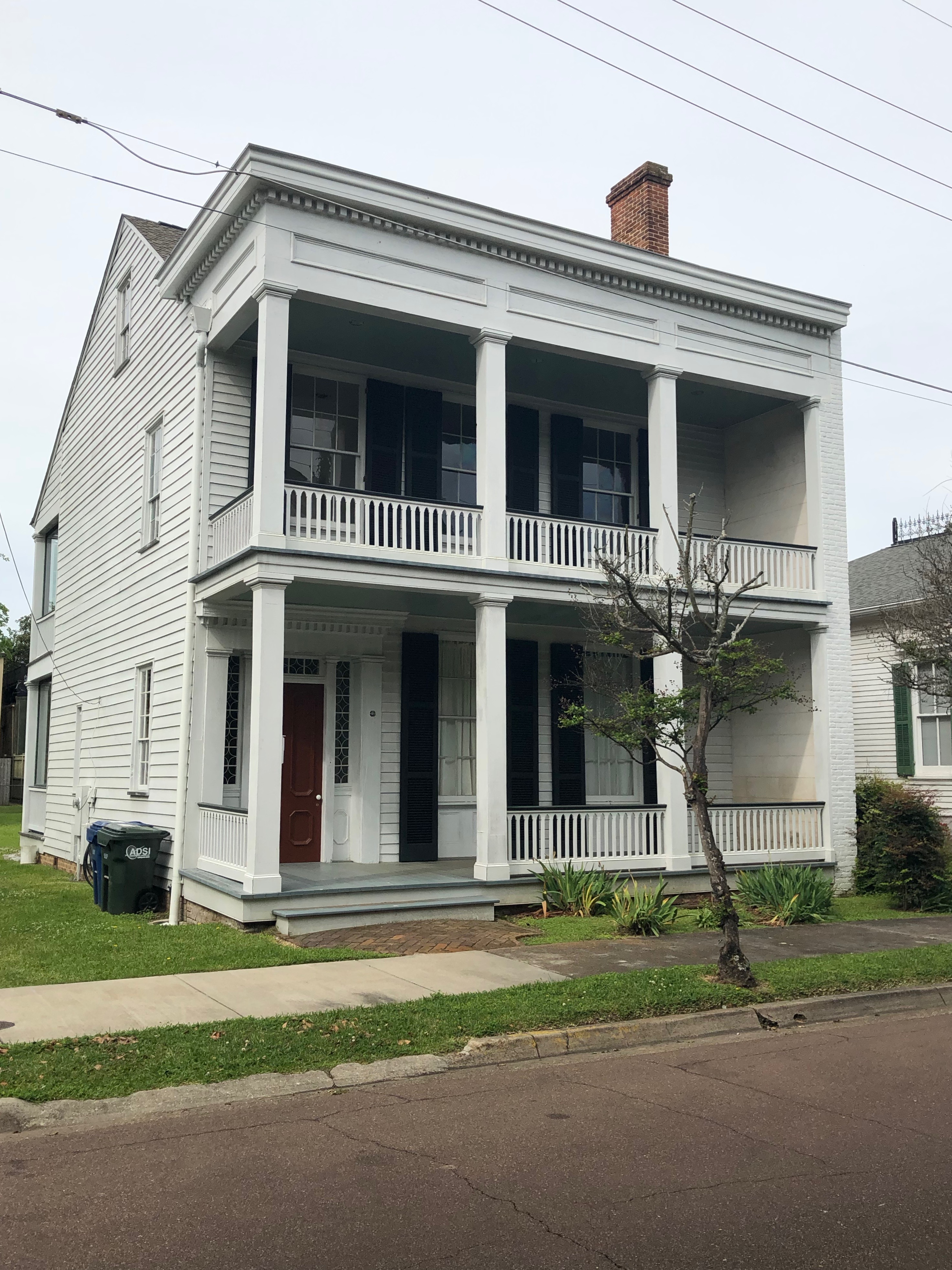

- Location within Mississippi Location within the United States
- Location: 506 High St., Natchez, Mississippi
- Coordinates: 31°33′42″N 91°24′0″W
- Area: less than one acre
- Built: 1836; 190 years ago
- NRHP reference No.: 79001304
- Added to NRHP: April 17, 1979

The Tillman House is a historic house in Natchez, Mississippi, USA.

== History ==
The Tillman House was built from 1834 to 1837 by Joseph Neibert and Peter Gemmell. In 1837, it was purchased by Lemuel P. Rooks. Roughly a decade later, in 1845, it was purchased by Dr. Charles H. Dubs, a dentist from Philadelphia. In the midst of the American Civil War, in 1862, the house was purchased by Joseph Tillman and his wife Ricca, a Jewish couple who had come to Natchez in 1843. It was subsequently inherited by their son, Cassius L. Tillman, Sr., who served as the treasurer of Adams County.

== Architectural significance ==
It has been listed on the National Register of Historic Places since April 17, 1979.
