= Lisle-Shields Town House =

Historic house in Mississippi, United States

- U.S. National Register of Historic Places
- Location within Mississippi Location within the United States
- Location: 701 N. Union St., Natchez, Mississippi
- Coordinates: 31°33′50″N 91°23′47″W
- Area: less than one acre
- Built: 1862
- Architectural style: Greek Revival
- NRHP reference No.: 79001289
- Added to NRHP: March 29, 1979

The Lisle-Shields Town House is a historic house in Natchez, Mississippi, USA. It built from 1860 to 1864. It has been listed on the National Register of Historic Places since March 29, 1979.
