= Van Court Town House =

Historic house in Mississippi, United States

- U.S. National Register of Historic Places
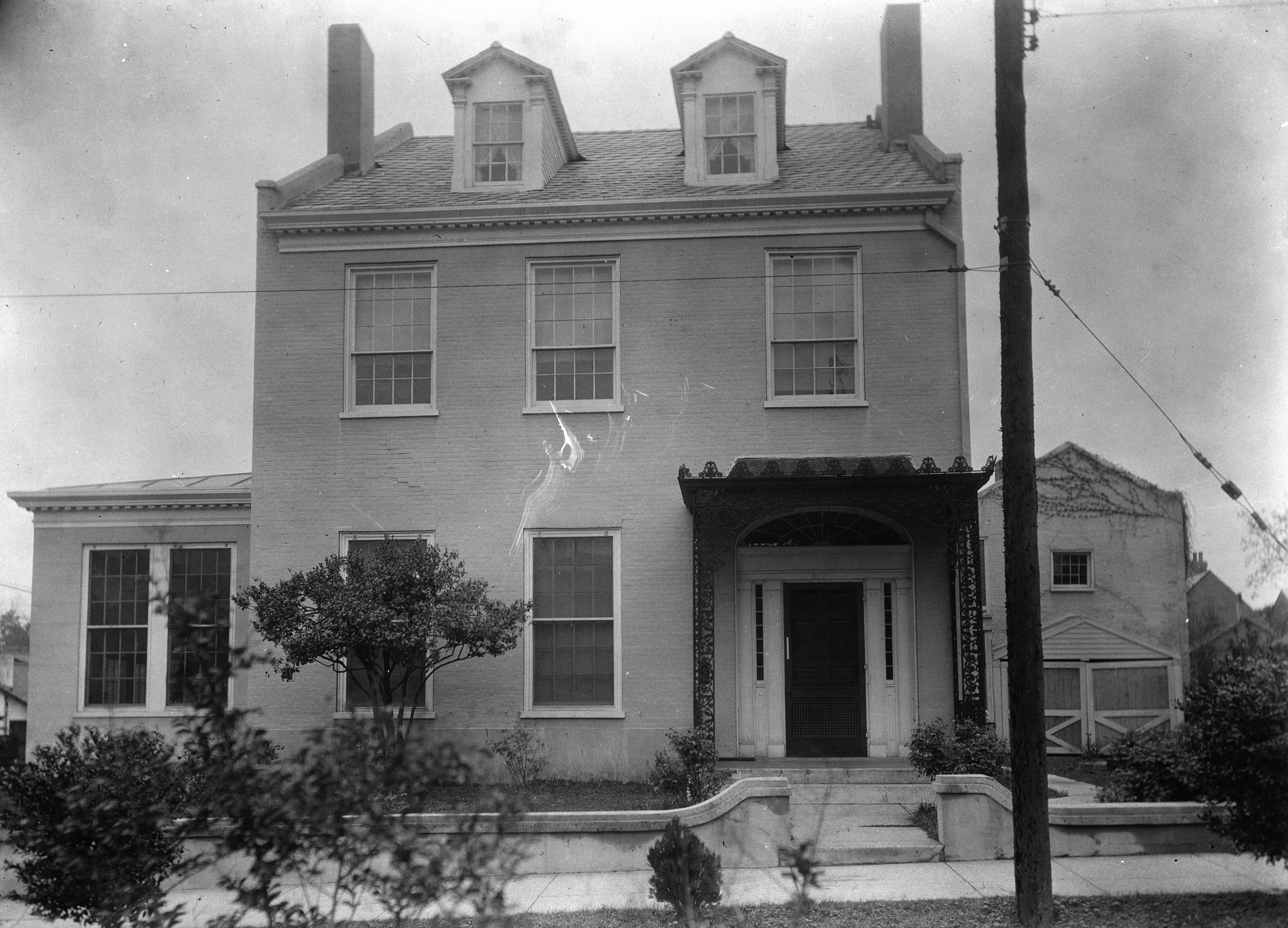

- Location within Mississippi Location within the United States
- Location: 510 Washington St., Natchez, Mississippi
- Coordinates: 31°33′25″N 91°24′28″W
- Area: less than one acre
- Built: 1836
- Architectural style: Federal
- NRHP reference No.: 80004474
- Added to NRHP: July 9, 1980

The Van Court Town House is a historic townhouse in Natchez, Mississippi, USA.

== History ==
The land belonged to Joseph Quegles, a Spanish planter, in the early 19th century. It was purchased by James Ferguson, Quegles's son-in-law, in 1834. The townhouse was completed in 1836. Two years later, in 1838, it was purchased by Dr. Andrew Macrery. By 1870, it was purchased by Elias J. Van Court.

== Architectural significance ==
It has been listed on the National Register of Historic Places since July 9, 1980.
