= Weymouth Hall =

Historic house in Mississippi, United States

- U.S. National Register of Historic Places
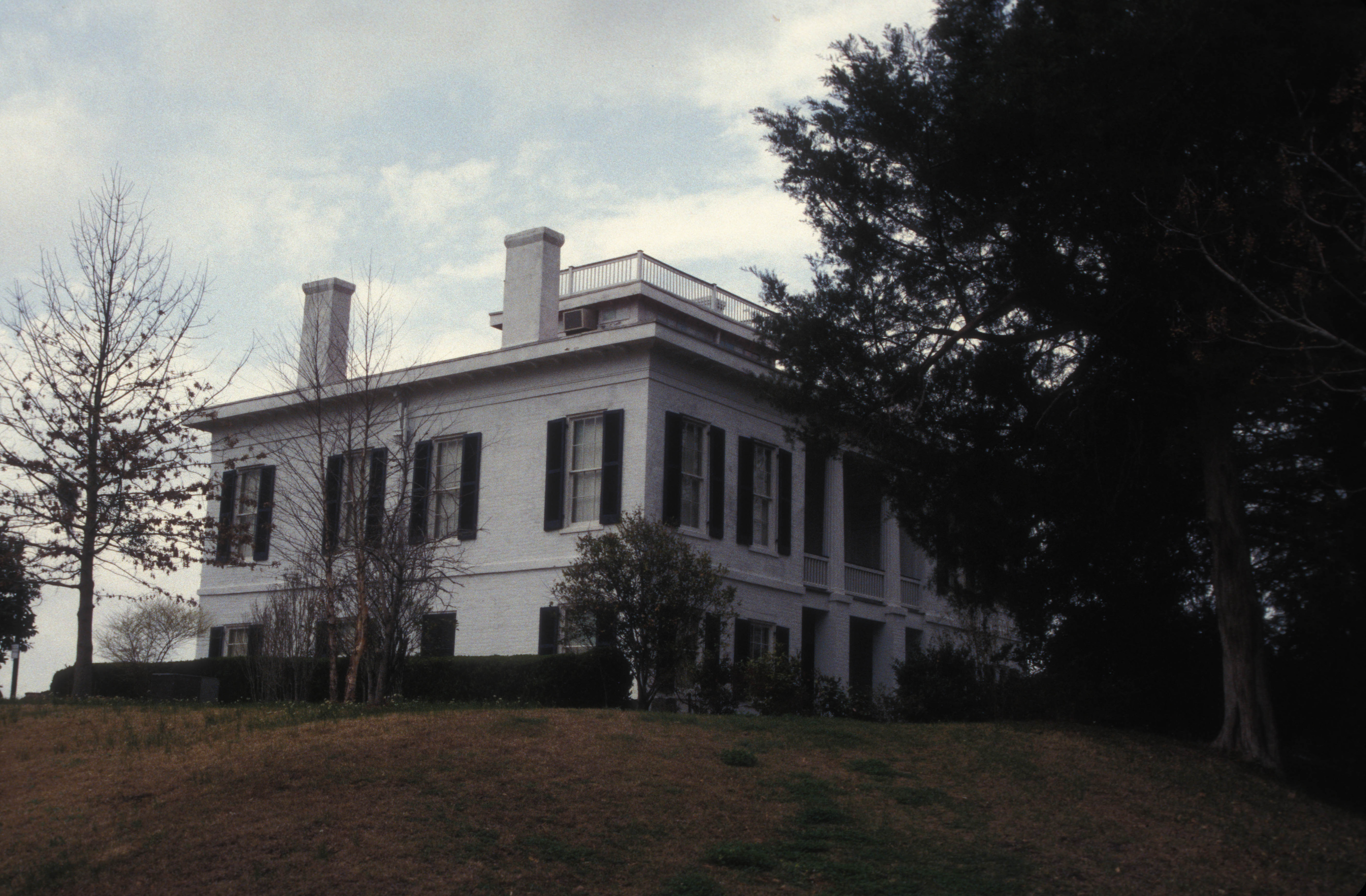
- Location: Natchez, Mississippi
- Built: 1850
- NRHP reference No.: 80002197
- Added to NRHP: March 12, 1980

Weymouth Hall is a historic mansion in Natchez, Mississippi.

== Location ==
It is located at 1 Cemetery Road in Natchez, Adams County, Mississippi. It sits atop a bluff, overlooking the Mississippi River.

== History ==
The mansion was built in 1850 for Colonel John Weymouth. It is two stories high with galleries at the front and at the back.

It is now used as a bed & breakfast. The house is mentioned by author Stark Young in his novel entitled, So Red the Rose.

== Heritage significance ==
It has been listed on the National Register of Historic Places since March 12, 1980.
