= Dr. Charles H. Dubs Townhouse =

Historic house in Mississippi, United States

- Dubs, Dr. Charles H., Townhouse
- U.S. National Register of Historic Places
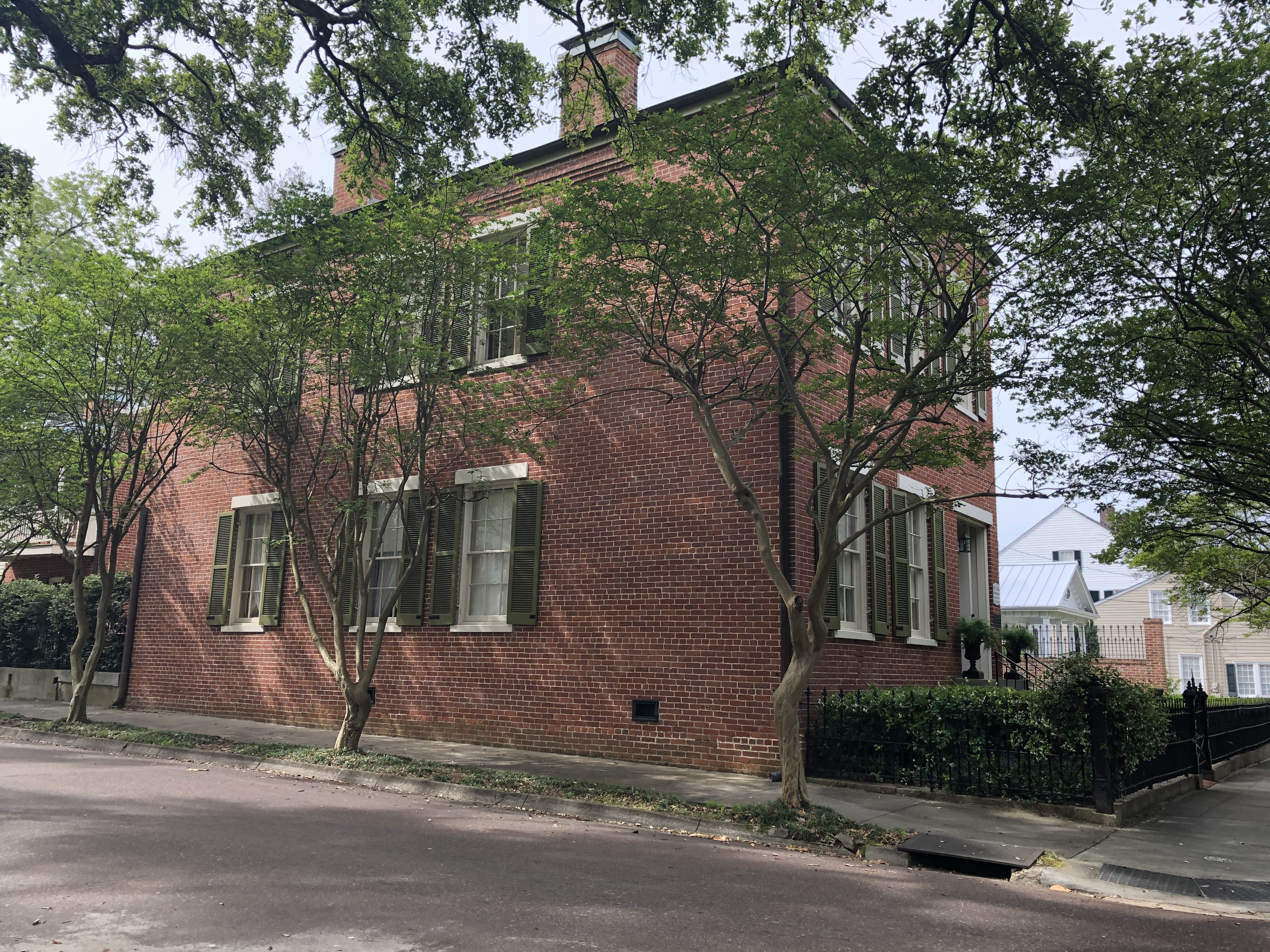

- Location within Mississippi Location within the United States
- Location: 311 N. Pearl St., Natchez, Mississippi
- Coordinates: 31°33′44″N 91°24′2″W
- Area: less than one acre
- Built: 1852
- NRHP reference No.: 78001577
- Added to NRHP: May 5, 1978

The Dr. Charles H. Dubs Townhouse is a historic townhouse in Natchez, Mississippi, USA.

== History ==
The townhouse was built in 1852 for Charles H. Dubs, a physician from Philadelphia.

== Heritage significance ==
It has been listed on the National Register of Historic Places since May 5, 1978.
