= Traveller's Rest (Natchez, Mississippi) =

Historic house in Mississippi, United States

- U.S. National Register of Historic Places
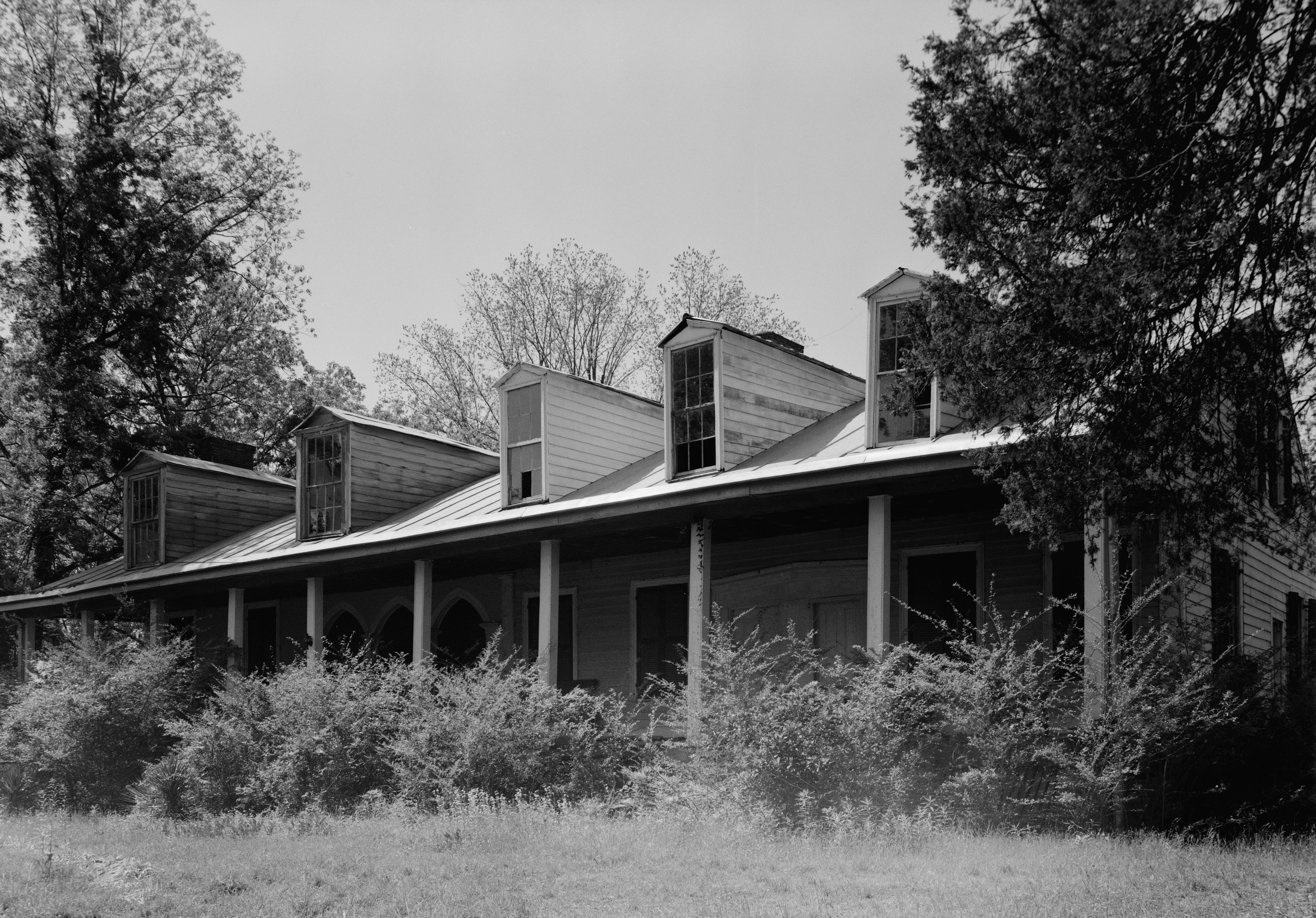
- Nearest city: Natchez, Mississippi
- Area: 40.2 acres (16.3 ha)
- Built: 1835
- Architectural style: Greek Revival, Federal, Gothic Revival
- NRHP reference No.: 84002110
- Added to NRHP: May 3, 1984

Traveller's Rest is a historic house in Natchez, Mississippi, USA. It has been listed on the National Register of Historic Places since May 3, 1984.
