= Bedford Plantation =

Historic house in Mississippi, United States

- U.S. National Register of Historic Places
- Location: Natchez, Mississippi
- Area: 81 acres (33 ha)
- Built: 1830
- NRHP reference No.: 78001576
- Added to NRHP: November 16, 1978

The Bedford Plantation is a historic Southern plantation in Natchez, Adams County, Mississippi.

== Location ==
It is located on Canonsburg Road, off U.S. Route 61, to the North East of Natchez, Mississippi. Coles Creek runs alongside the plantation.

== History ==
The mansion on the plantation was built in the 1830s. It was added to the National Register of Historic Places on November 16, 1978.
