= Fair Oaks (Natchez, Mississippi) =

Historic house in Mississippi, United States

- U.S. National Register of Historic Places
- Location within Mississippi Location within the United States
- Nearest city: Natchez, Mississippi
- Area: 11.4 acres (4.6 ha)
- Built: 1822
- NRHP reference No.: 76001084
- Added to NRHP: November 13, 1976

Fair Oaks is a historic house in Natchez, Mississippi, USA. For at least a decade, it was the main residence and headquarters of a plantation, a forced-labor farm worked by enslaved people.

== History ==
The land belonged to Sir William Dunbar in the early 19th century; Dunbar had established a larger plantation called The Forest. The house, known as Greek Oak, was built in 1822 for his son-in-law, Henry W. Huntington and his daughter, Helen Dunbar.

By 1836, the house was purchased by John Hutchins, who renamed it Woodbourne. Two decades later, in 1856, it was purchased by Dr. Orrick Metcalfe, an alumnus of Yale College and trustee of Jefferson College. The property came with 100 acres, livestock and enslaved people from Africa. Metcalfe who renamed it Fair Oaks and ran it as a cotton plantation. By 1963, it was purchased by his great-grandson, Bazile R. Lanneau.

== Architectural significance ==
It has been listed on the National Register of Historic Places since November 13, 1976.
