= Mercer House (Natchez, Mississippi) =

Historic house in Mississippi, United States

- U.S. National Register of Historic Places
- Location within Mississippi Location within the United States
- Location: 118 S. Wall St., Natchez, Mississippi
- Coordinates: 31°33′37″N 91°24′18″W
- Area: 2.5 acres (1.0 ha)
- Built: 1819
- Architectural style: Late Victorian, Federal
- NRHP reference No.: 79001292
- Added to NRHP: August 9, 1979

Mercer House is a historic house in Natchez, Mississippi. It was built circa 1820. It has been listed on the National Register of Historic Places since August 9, 1979.
