= China Grove Plantation =

Historic house in Mississippi, United States

- U.S. National Register of Historic Places
- Location within Mississippi Location within the United States
- Location: Natchez, Mississippi
- Area: 228 acres (92 ha)
- Built: 1855
- NRHP reference No.: 82003089
- Added to NRHP: April 7, 1982

The China Grove Plantation is a historic Southern plantation in Natchez, Adams County, Mississippi.

== Location ==
It is located in South Natchez, near Sibley.

== History ==
The wood-framed cottage was built in 1854. It has two main rooms, cabinets and galleries. In 1854, James Railey, who already owned the Oakland Plantation, purchased this property. However, after his death, his heirs lost the property due to a chancery lawsuit.

A few years after the American Civil War of 1861–1865, in 1869, former slaves Auguste Mazique and his wife Sarah purchased the property at a public auction. They became the largest landowners in southwestern Adams County by the end of the nineteenth century.

It has been added to the National Register of Historic Places since April 7, 1982.
