= William Ailes House =

Historic house in Mississippi, United States

- U.S. National Register of Historic Places
- Location within Mississippi Location within the United States
- Location: 657 S. Canal St., Natchez, Mississippi
- Coordinates: 31°33′8″N 91°24′40″W
- Area: less than one acre
- Built: 1853
- Built by: Thomas Bowen
- Architectural style: Greek Revival
- NRHP reference No.: 80002190
- Added to NRHP: March 12, 1980

The William Ailes House (a.k.a. "Bellevue") is a historic house in Natchez, Mississippi.

== Location ==
It is located at 657 South Canal Street in Natchez, Mississippi.

== History ==
It was built by Thomas Bowen in the 1850s in the Greek Revival architectural style.

It has been listed on the National Register of Historic Places listings since March 12, 1980.
