= Warren-Erwin House =

Historic house in Mississippi, United States

- U.S. National Register of Historic Places
- Location within Mississippi Location within the United States
- Nearest city: Washington, Mississippi
- Area: 11 acres (4.5 ha)
- Built: 1860
- Architectural style: Greek Revival
- NRHP reference No.: 82003095
- Added to NRHP: March 19, 1982

The Warren-Erwin House is a historic house in Natchez, Mississippi, USA.

== History ==
The house was built prior to the American Civil War of 1861-1865 for Daniel Warren, a planter, and his wife, Elizabeth, near Washington in Jefferson County, Mississippi. In the 1870s, it was inherited by their daughter and her husband, T. J. Erwin. By 1979, it was acquired by their great-great-grandson, who moved the house to Adams County near Natchez.

== Heritage significance ==
It has been listed on the National Register of Historic Places since March 19, 1982.
