= Myrtle Bank (Natchez, Mississippi) =

Historic house in Mississippi, United States

- U.S. National Register of Historic Places
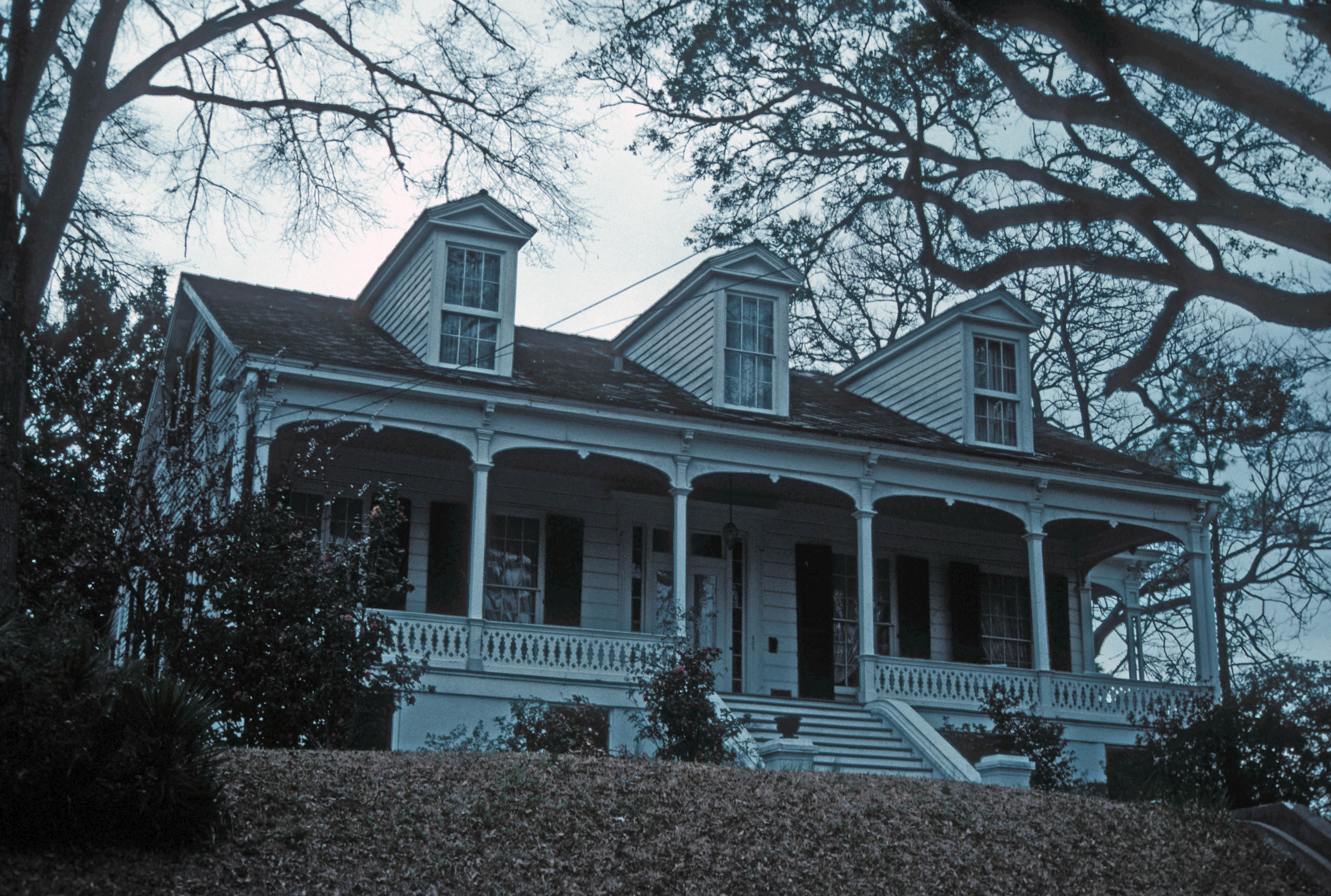

- Location within Mississippi Location within the United States
- Location: 408 N. Pearl St., Natchez, Mississippi
- Coordinates: 31°33′48″N 91°24′2″W
- Area: less than one acre
- Built: 1816
- Architectural style: Mixed (more Than 2 Styles From Different Periods)
- NRHP reference No.: 78001583
- Added to NRHP: December 22, 1978

Myrtle Bank is a historic house in Natchez, Mississippi, USA.

== History ==
Sir William Dunbar surveyed the land in the 18th century. It was granted to George Overarker, a planter, in 1795. Overarker, who also owned Hawthorne Place and Hope Farm, built Myrtle Bank prior to 1818.

By 1835, Alfred Cochran and his wife Eliza, who was William Dunbar's great-granddaughter, purchased the house. Two decades later, in 1856, it was purchased by Benjamin Wade, a planter. Wade leased it to The Natchez Young Ladies Institute, a girl's boarding school, until the outset of the American Civil War in 1861. The house remained in the Wade family until the 1870s.

The house was restored by a new owner in 1957.

== Architectural significance ==
It has been listed on the National Register of Historic Places since December 22, 1978.
