= Mount Olive (Natchez, Mississippi) =

Historic house in Mississippi, United States

- U.S. National Register of Historic Places
- Location within Mississippi Location within the United States
- Nearest city: Natchez, Mississippi
- Coordinates: 31°37′14″N 91°20′27″W
- Area: 6.3 acres (2.5 ha)
- Built: 1840
- NRHP reference No.: 80002194
- Added to NRHP: November 28, 1980

Mount Olive is a historic house in Natchez, Mississippi, USA.

== History ==
The land belonged to William Foster in the early 19th century. By 1840, it was inherited by his great-niece, Eliza Tannehill Foster and her husband, Emmanuel Rigillio. The couple built a great house on the plantation from 1840 to 1843. It stayed in the Foster family until 1978, when it was sold to Bernard P. Wood.

== Architectural significance ==
It has been listed on the National Register of Historic Places since November 28, 1980.
