= Woodstock (Natchez, Mississippi) =

Historic house in Mississippi, United States

- U.S. National Register of Historic Places
- Location within Mississippi Location within the United States
- Nearest city: Natchez, Mississippi
- Coordinates: 31°25′33″N 91°19′30″W
- Built: 1851
- Architectural style: Greek Revival
- NRHP reference No.: 89000782
- Added to NRHP: June 29, 1989

Woodstock in Natchez, Mississippi is a Greek Revival building built in 1851. It was listed on the National Register of Historic Places in 1989. The house stands 12 miles (19 km) from the Natchez city center.
