= Smithland (Natchez, Mississippi) =

Historic house in Mississippi, United States

- U.S. National Register of Historic Places
- Location within Mississippi Location within the United States
- Nearest city: Natchez, Mississippi
- Coordinates: 31°23′3″N 91°21′13″W
- Area: 5.8 acres (2.3 ha)
- Built: 1815
- Architectural style: Greek Revival
- NRHP reference No.: 87000575
- Added to NRHP: April 2, 1987

Smithland is a historic house in Natchez, Mississippi, USA.

== History ==
The land was acquired by Calvin Smith in the late 18th century, who gave it to his son, Benijah Smith, in the early 19th century.

Smithland was built as a great house on a plantation from 1815 to 1817. It was designed in the Federal architectural style.

The house was purchased by John H. Thorn in 1834. When it was remodelled in 1845, it was redesigned in the Greek Revival architectural style. By the 1980s, the house still belonged to Thorn's descendants.

== Heritage significance ==
It has been listed on the National Register of Historic Places since April 2, 1987.
