= Meadvilla =

Historic house in Mississippi, United States

- U.S. National Register of Historic Places
- Location within Mississippi Location within the United States
- Location: Address Restricted, Washington, Mississippi
- Area: 18.5 acres (7.5 ha)
- Architectural style: Greek Revival, Federal
- NRHP reference No.: 82000570
- Added to NRHP: November 17, 1982

Meadvilla is a historic house in Natchez, Mississippi, USA. It has been listed on the National Register of Historic Places since November 17, 1982.
