= Montpellier (Natchez, Mississippi) =

Coordinates: 31.5357°N 91.3508°W

Montpellier is a historic plantation house built as the main residence and headquarters of a forced-labor farm in Natchez, Mississippi. It was built in the 1840s in the Greek Revival architectural style for Charles Whitmore, an English-born planter and enslaver. It has been listed on the National Register of Historic Places since December 18, 1979.
