= Mistletoe (Natchez, Mississippi) =

Historic house in Mississippi, United States

- U.S. National Register of Historic Places
- Location within Mississippi Location within the United States
- Nearest city: Natchez, Mississippi
- Coordinates: 31.62665°N 91.32021°W
- Area: 136.7 acres (55.3 ha)
- Built: 1807
- NRHP reference No.: 73001000
- Added to NRHP: October 10, 1973

Mistletoe is a historic house in Natchez, Mississippi, USA. It was built in 1807 for Peter Bisland, whose brother William subsequently built Mount Repose. It has been listed on the National Register of Historic Places since October 10, 1973.
