= Elgin (Natchez, Mississippi) =

Historic house in Mississippi, United States

- U.S. National Register of Historic Places
- Location within Mississippi Location within the United States
- Location: Natchez, Mississippi
- Area: 15.3 acres (6.2 ha)
- Built: 1823
- Architectural style: Greek Revival
- NRHP reference No.: 79001284
- Added to NRHP: January 19, 1979

Elgin is a historic house in Natchez, Mississippi, United States.

== Location ==
It is located South of Natchez, Mississippi, off U.S. Route 61.

== History ==
It was built in 1791 and was later the "town house" of Dr John Carmichael Jenkins, a prominent planter. It has twenty-five acres of garden.

It has been listed on the National Register of Historic Places since January 19, 1979. It now serves as a bed & breakfast.
