= Winchester House (Natchez, Mississippi) =

Historic house in Mississippi, United States

- U.S. National Register of Historic Places
- Location within Mississippi Location within the United States
- Location: 816 Main St., Natchez, Mississippi
- Coordinates: 31°33′25″N 91°23′55″W
- Area: less than one acre
- Built: 1837
- Architectural style: Greek Revival, Federal
- NRHP reference No.: 79001305
- Added to NRHP: January 31, 1979

Winchester House is a historic house within the Natchez On-Top-of-the-Hill Historic District in Natchez, Mississippi, U.S.A.. It has been listed on the National Register of Historic Places since January 31, 1979.

== History ==
Winchester House was built for Horace Gridley, a city alderman, from 1836 to 1838. It was acquired by Judge Josiah Winchester in 1854. It stayed in the Winchester family until 1928, when it was sold to the Burns family. Eventually, it was purchased by Paul Brown Harrington in 1973.
