= Magnolia Hill (Natchez, Mississippi) =

Historic house in Mississippi, United States

- U.S. National Register of Historic Places
- Location within Mississippi Location within the United States
- Nearest city: Natchez, Mississippi
- Area: 60 acres (24 ha)
- Built: 1836
- NRHP reference No.: 79001290
- Added to NRHP: March 30, 1979

Magnolia Hill is a historic house in Natchez, Mississippi, USA.

== History ==
The house was built from 1834 to 1840 for Alexander Boyd, a physician and planter. It stayed in the Boyd family until 1958. By 1977, it was purchased by William Carl McGehee.

== Heritage significance ==
It has been listed on the National Register of Historic Places since March 30, 1979.
