= Hawthorne Place =

Historic house in Mississippi, United States

- U.S. National Register of Historic Places
- Location within Mississippi Location within the United States
- Location: Lower Woodville Rd., Natchez, Mississippi
- Coordinates: 31°32′21″N 91°24′05″W
- Area: 12.2 acres (4.9 ha)
- Built: 1824
- Architectural style: Federal
- NRHP reference No.: 79001286
- Added to NRHP: July 3, 1979

Hawthorne Place is a historic house in Natchez, Mississippi, USA.

== History ==
The land belonged to George Overaker, a planter, in the early 19th century. His daughter, Maria Overaker and his widow, Margaret Overaker, built Hawthorne Place from 1825 to 1827. It was purchased by Robert Dunbar II in 1833, who called it Hawthorne Place.

The house was purchased by the McGehee family in 1928. By the late 1970s, it belonged to his daughter, Mrs. Hyde Dunbar Jenkins.

== Architectural significance ==
It has been listed on the National Register of Historic Places since July 3, 1979.
