= Twin Oaks (Natchez) =

Historic house in Mississippi, United States

- White Cottage
- U.S. National Register of Historic Places
- Location within Mississippi Location within the United States
- Location: 71 Homochitto St., Natchez, Mississippi
- Coordinates: 31°33′2″N 91°23′19″W
- Area: 6 acres (2.4 ha)
- Built: 1814
- Architectural style: Greek Revival
- NRHP reference No.: 83003937
- Added to NRHP: October 13, 1983

Twin Oaks, also known as White Cottage, is a historic house in Natchez, Mississippi, USA.

== History ==
The land belonged to the Routh family in the 18th century. It was acquired by Lewis Evans, a planter and sheriff, from 1810 to 1814. It was purchased by Pierce Connelly in 1832. Roughly a decade later, in 1841, it was purchased by Charles Dubuisson, the former president of Jefferson College and later a member of Mississippi legislature. By 1940, it was purchased by Homer Whittington.

== Heritage significance ==
It has been listed on the National Register of Historic Places since October 13, 1983.
