= The Burn (Natchez, Mississippi) =

Historic house in Mississippi, United States

- U.S. National Register of Historic Places
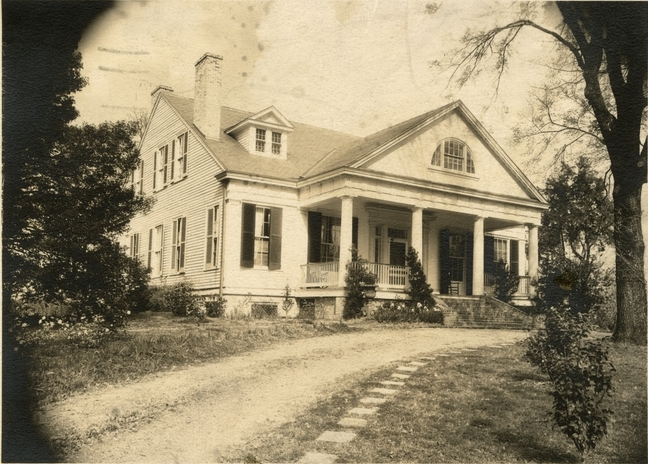
- The Burn in 1950

- Location within Mississippi Location within the United States
- Location: 307 Oak St., Natchez, Mississippi
- Coordinates: 31°33′55″N 91°23′46″W
- Built: 1834, c. 1940
- Architect: Montgomery & Keys
- Architectural style: Greek Revival
- NRHP reference No.: 79001280
- Added to NRHP: July 03, 1979

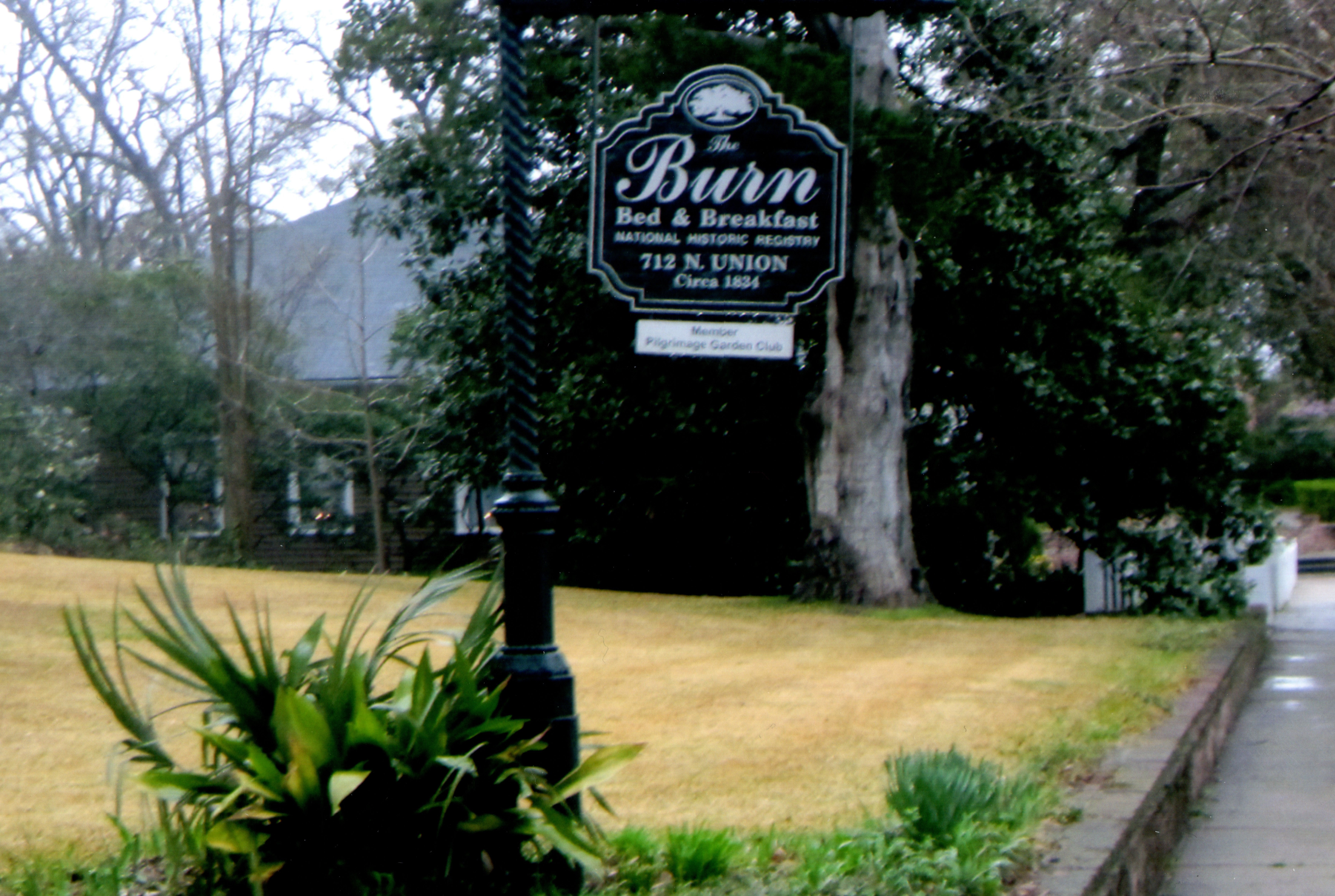
The Burn - Sign in front of the house - 2013

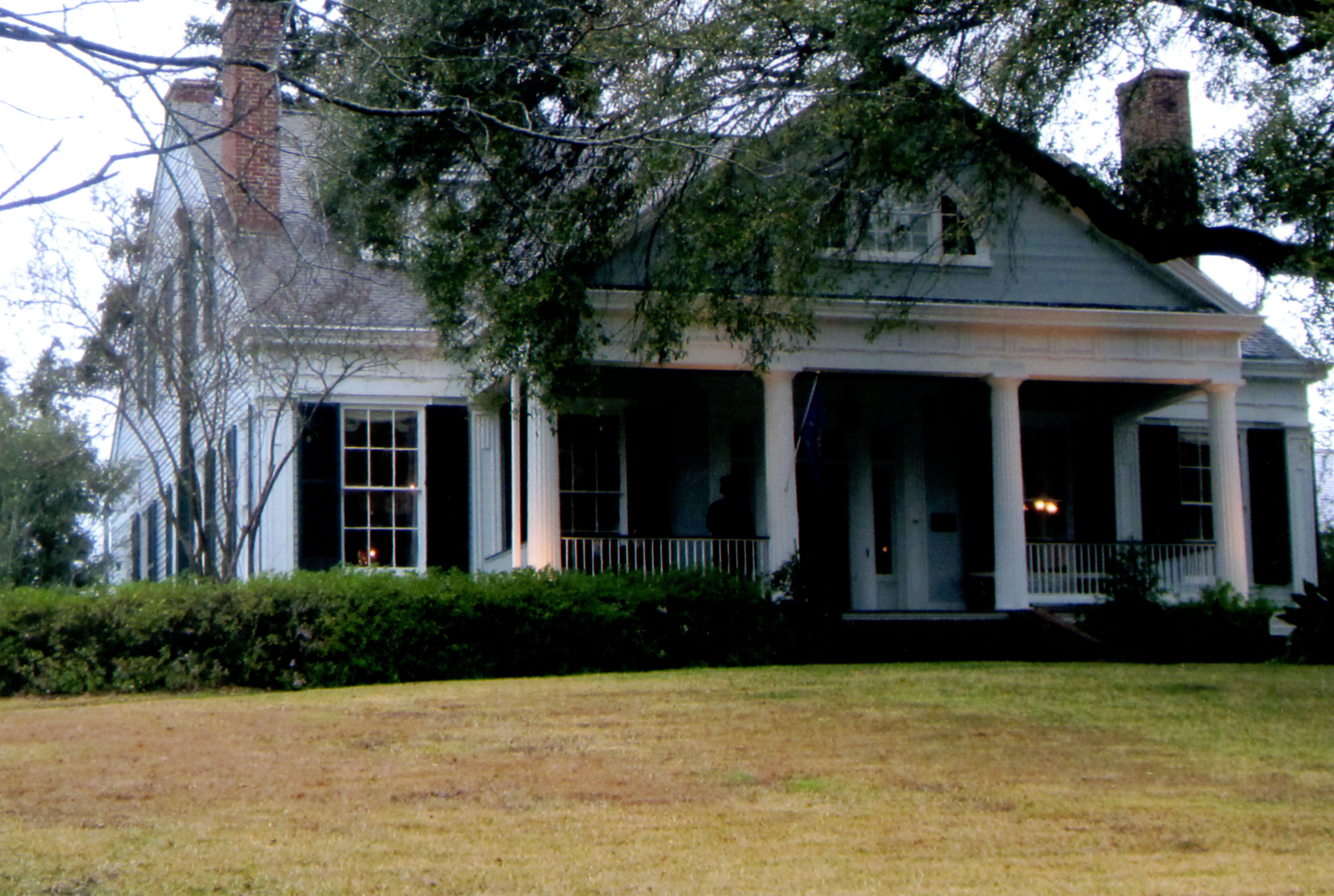
The Burn - Natchez, Mississippi - 2013

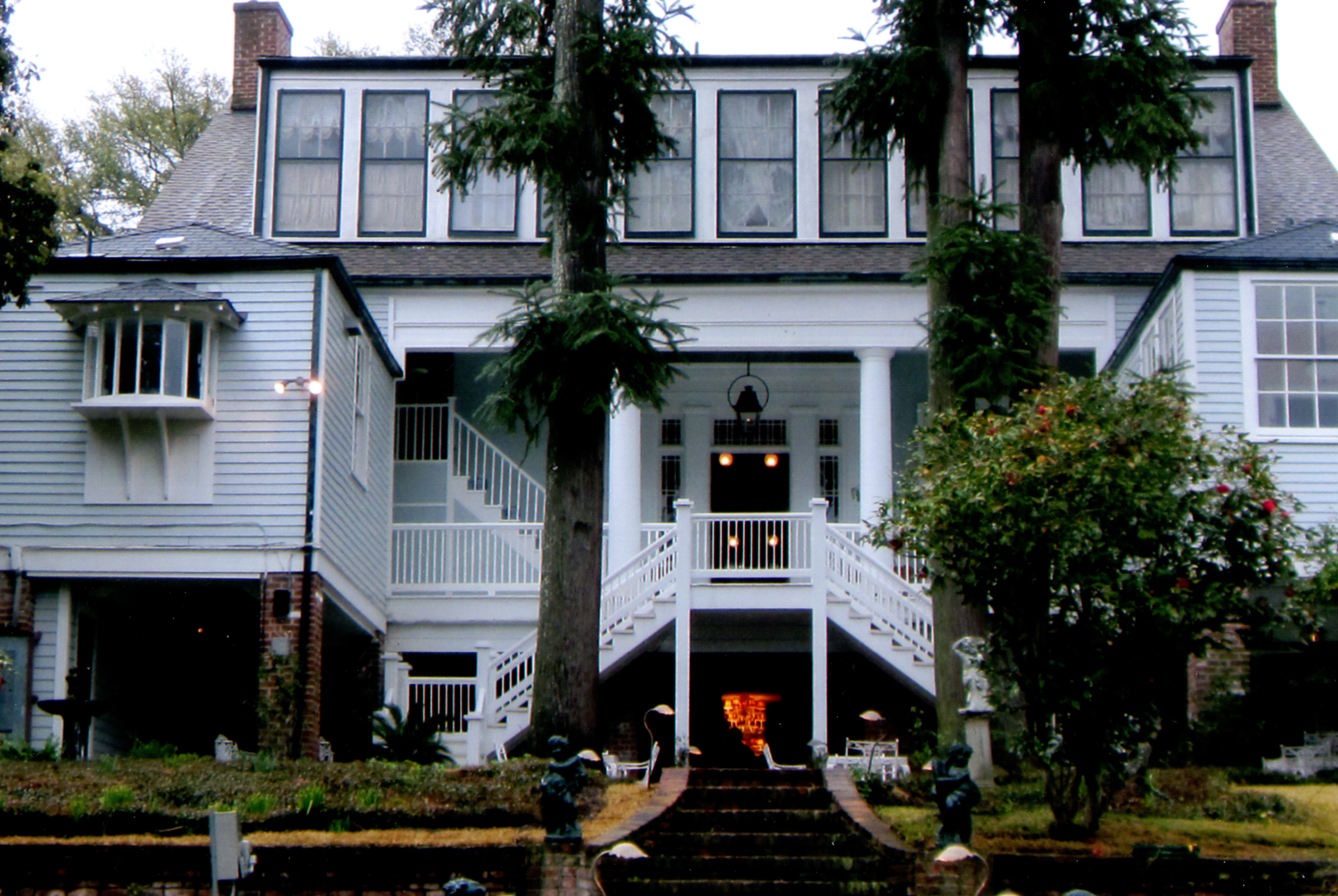
The Burn - Rear view - 2013

The Burn, a house built in 1834, is the oldest documented Greek Revival residence in Natchez, Mississippi. It was built on a knoll to the north of the old town area of Natchez. It was listed on the National Register of Historic Places in 1979.

The house is a one-and-a-half-story Greek Revival double-pile central hall plan building built of frame construction upon a brick basement. It has a five bay east-facing façade with a pedimented portico supported by four fluted Doric columns.

It was built to be the residence of John P. Walworth, a wealthy planter, merchant, banker, and politician.
