= Cottage Gardens =

- U.S. National Register of Historic Places
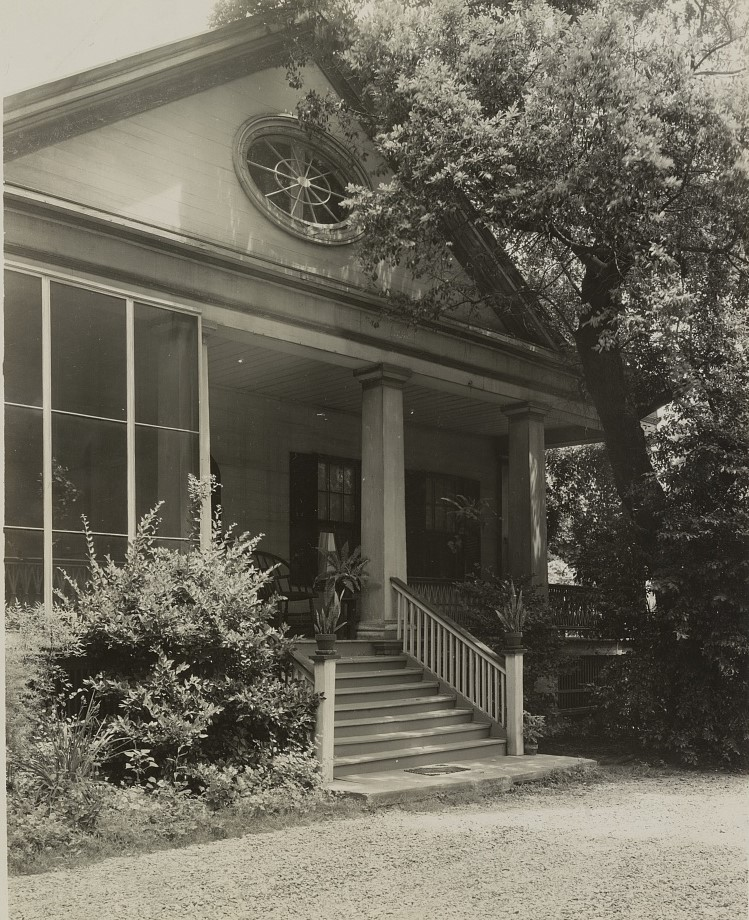
- Cottage Gardens, by Frances Benjamin Johnston, 1938

- Location within Mississippi Location within the United States
- Location: 816 Myrtle Ave., Natchez, Mississippi
- Coordinates: 31°34′8″N 91°23′43″W
- Area: 4 acres (1.6 ha)
- Built: 1795
- Architectural style: Federal, Late Federal
- NRHP reference No.: 79001281
- Added to NRHP: July 5, 1979

Cottage Gardens is a historic house in Natchez, Mississippi, USA.

== History ==
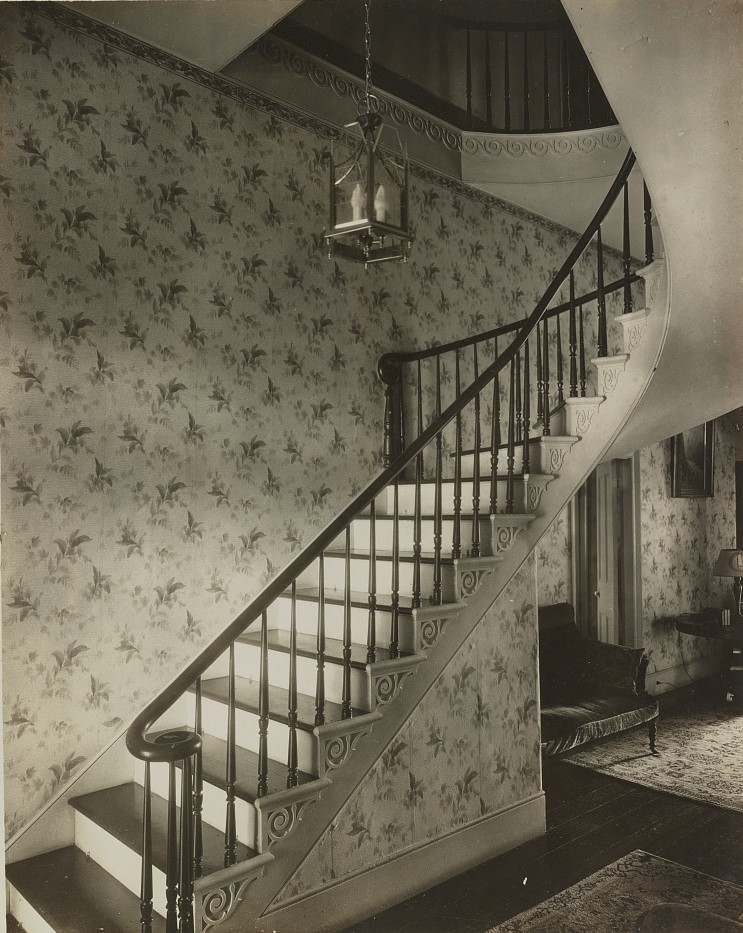
Cottage gardens by Frances Benjamin Johnston, 1938

The house was built for Don José Vidal in 1795. It was subsequently purchased by Earl Norman, a photographer. By 1963, it was purchased by William C. McGehee.

== Architectural significance ==
It has been listed on the National Register of Historic Places since July 5, 1979.
