= Roos House (Natchez, Mississippi) =

Historic house in Mississippi, United States

- U.S. National Register of Historic Places
- Location within Mississippi Location within the United States
- Location: 208 Linton Ave, Natchez, Mississippi
- Coordinates: 31°34′8″N 91°23′57″W
- Area: less than one acre
- Built: c. 1905
- Architectural style: Colonial Revival, Art Nouveau
- NRHP reference No.: 79001300
- Added to NRHP: November 8, 1979

The Roos House in Natchez, Mississippi was built in 1905. It was listed on the National Register of Historic Places in 1979.

Its NRHP nomination provided a strong recommendation for the significance of the house:

The Roos House is one of the finest examples of early twentieth-century residential architecture in Natchez. The Colonial Revival and Art Nouveau detailing of the house is so well and unusually executed that it sets the house apart from its contemporary Victorian counterparts. The house is also symbolic of the rise to prominence of the Jewish community in Natchez, a Southern town that was culturally, socially, intellectually, and economically dominated by its Jewish citizens from the post-Civil War years to the Great Depression.
