= Elms Court =

Historic house in Mississippi, United States

- U.S. National Register of Historic Places
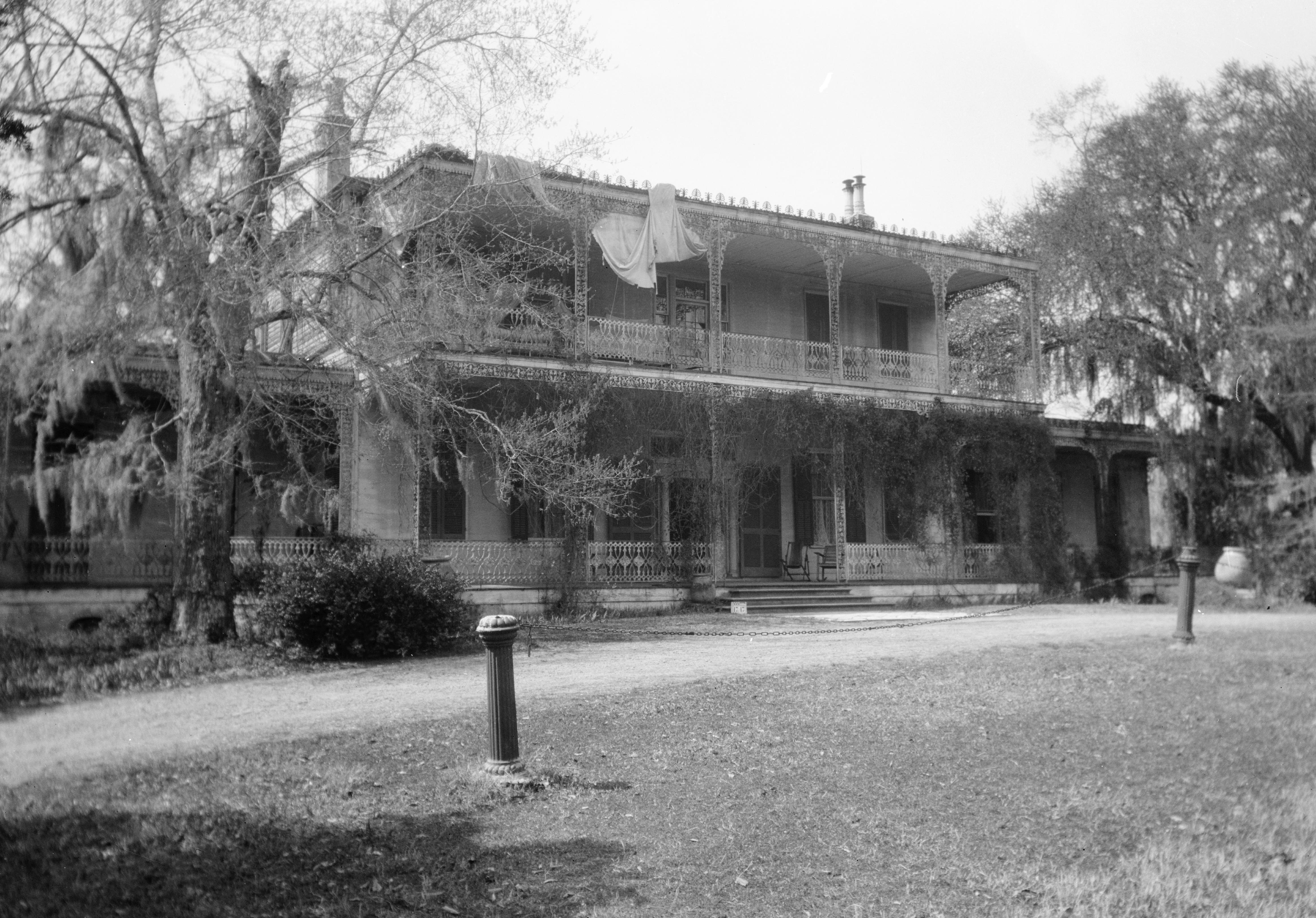

- Location within Mississippi Location within the United States
- Location: 42 John R. Junkin Drive, Natchez, Mississippi
- Coordinates: 31°31′54.97″N 91°23′43.07″W
- Area: 163 acres (66 ha)
- Built: 1836
- Architectural style: Greek Revival
- NRHP reference No.: 77000780
- Added to NRHP: December 2, 1977

Elms Court is a historic mansion in Natchez, Mississippi, United States.

== Location ==
It is located at 542 John R. Junkin Drive in Natchez, Mississippi.

== History ==
The mansion was built in 1835–1836. Galleries of lacy iron work said to have been brought from Belgium. In 1852, Francis Surget (1784–1856) purchased it for his daughter Jane (Surget) Merrill (1829–1866) and her husband Ayres Phillips Merrill II (1826–1883). Upon Surget's death in 1856, the property (including the house and eight enslaved people) was bequeathed to his daughter Jane.

It has been listed on the National Register of Historic Places since December 2, 1977 and may be unique among Natchez plantation houses in being owned by a supporter of the Union cause leading up to and during the Civil War.
