= Brandon Hall (Washington, Mississippi) =

Historic house in Mississippi, United States

- U.S. National Register of Historic Places
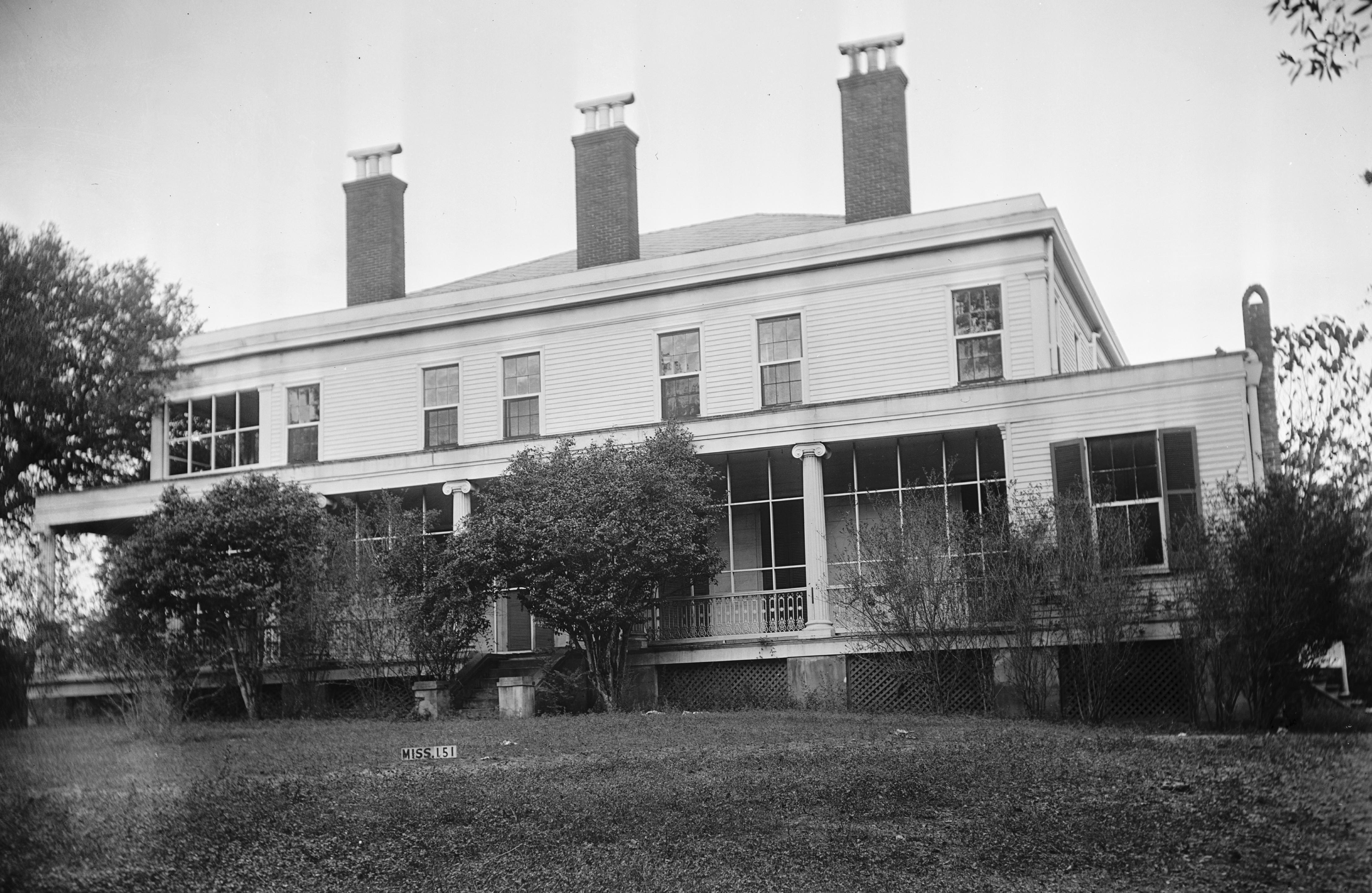
- Front of Brandon Hall

- Location within Mississippi Location within the United States
- Location: Northeast of Washington, Mississippi on U.S. Route 61
- Coordinates: 31°36′53″N 91°15′10″W
- Area: 40.2 acres (16.3 ha)
- Built: 1856
- Architectural style: Greek Revival
- NRHP reference No.: 80002198
- Added to NRHP: June 12, 1980

Brandon Hall is a Greek Revival architecture style house built in 1856 in Washington, Mississippi, United States. It was listed on the National Register of Historic Places in 1980.

== History ==
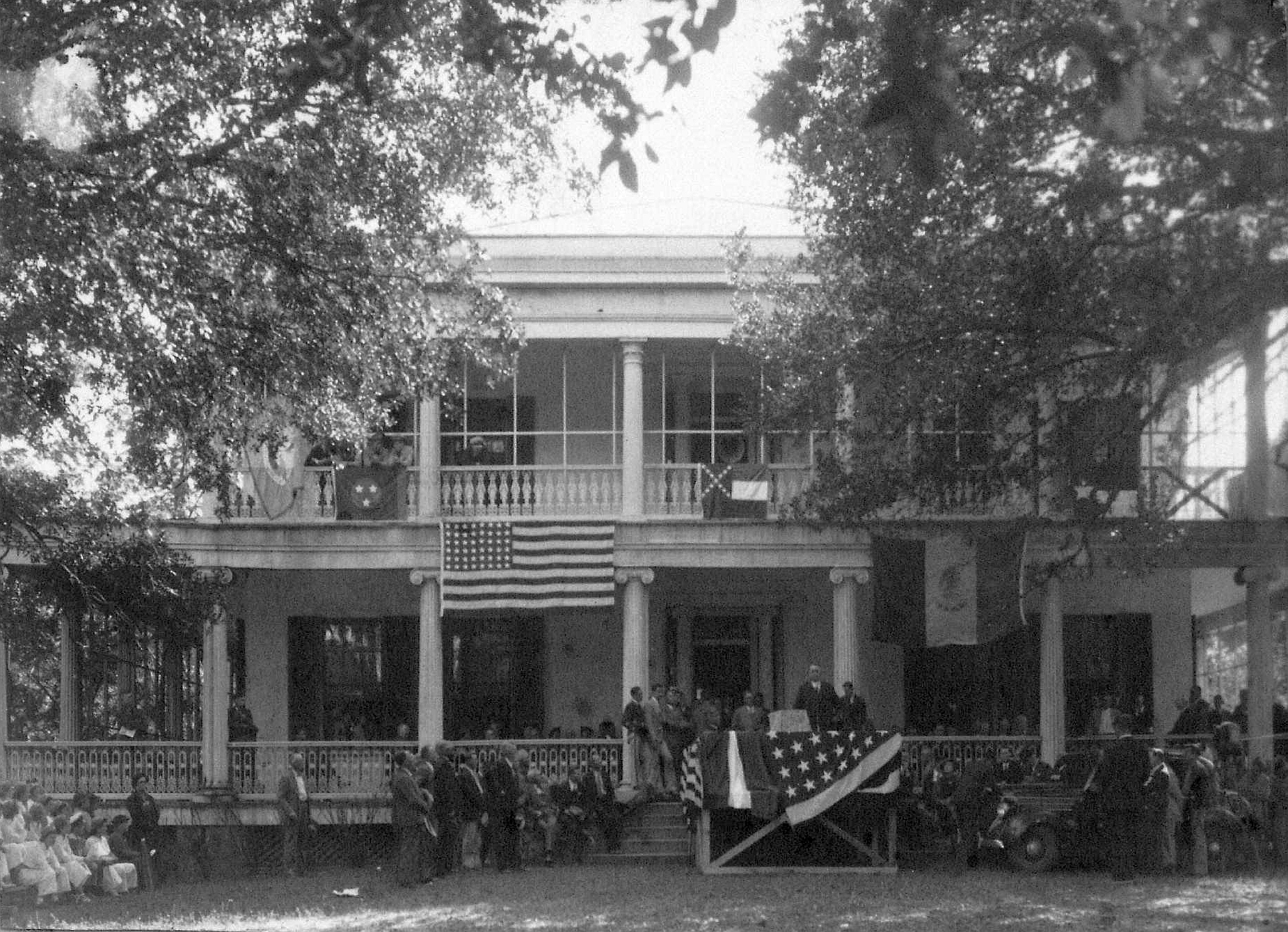
Brandon Hall, 1937

Brandon Hall was formally a large working cotton plantation located on the scenic Natchez Trace. The land on which Brandon Hall now stands first passed into private ownership as a royal grant from the Spanish King Carlos III in 1788. In 1809 the property was sold at public auction to William Lock Chew for the sum of $7,000. Chew constructed the first permanent dwelling consisting of a three-room brick house about twenty by sixty feet, built sometime between 1809 and 1820. This structure still exists as the "basement" of the present house known as Brandon Hall.

In 1833 Chew sold the property to Nathaniel Hoggatt, a successful planter whose daughter Charlotte inherited the land after his death. On October 29, 1840, Charlotte Hoggatt married Gerard Brandon III, who was the son of an early Governor of Mississippi and the grandson of a Revolutionary War Hero of the same name. They lived in this original dwelling until 1853, when they began construction of Brandon Hall which was completed in 1856.

In January 1914, the plantation, house, and land was sold to George Hightower as a result of a default on a promissory note, thus ending an 81-year chain of ownership by the Brandon and Hoggatt families. These 81 years extended from Mississippi's frontier days during the period of grace and plenty before the Civil War, and through the South's darkest hours after the war.

From 1914 until the present, Brandon Hall Plantation has had ten owners. In 1987 the home was completely renovated and restored, perfectly duplicating the original construction.

In 2009 the owners of the house, Edward L. and James R. Diefenthal of New Orleans, Louisiana, donated the house to the Historic Natchez Foundation.

In December 2009 the home was purchased by Ron and Kathy Garber of Lafayette, Louisiana, who opened it for Bed and Breakfast accommodation.

== See also ==
- National Register of Historic Places listings in Adams County, Mississippi
