= Airlie (Natchez) =

Historic house in Mississippi, United States

- U.S. National Register of Historic Places
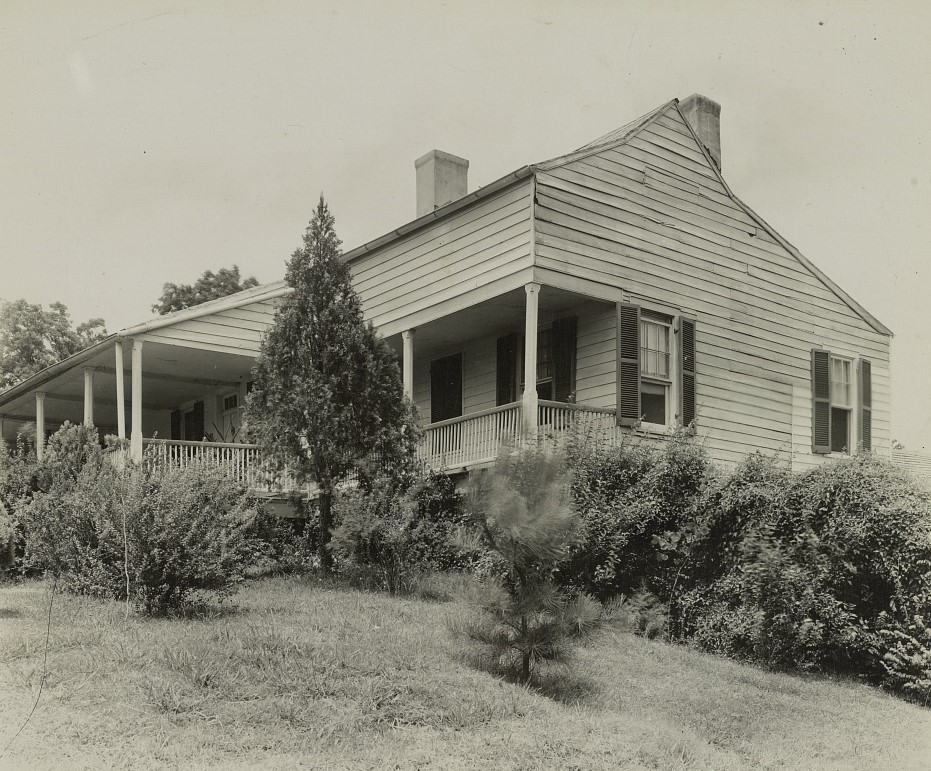
- Airlie, by Frances Benjamin Johnston, 1938

- Location within Mississippi Location within the United States
- Location: 9 Elm St., Natchez, Mississippi
- Coordinates: 31°34′9″N 91°23′40″W
- Area: 7 acres (2.8 ha)
- Built: 1793
- NRHP reference No.: 82000566
- Added to NRHP: October 29, 1982

Airlie (a.k.a. "Belvidere" or "Old Buckner Place") is a house in Natchez, Mississippi built in 1793.

== Location ==
It is located at number 9 on Elm Street in Natchez, Mississippi.

== History ==
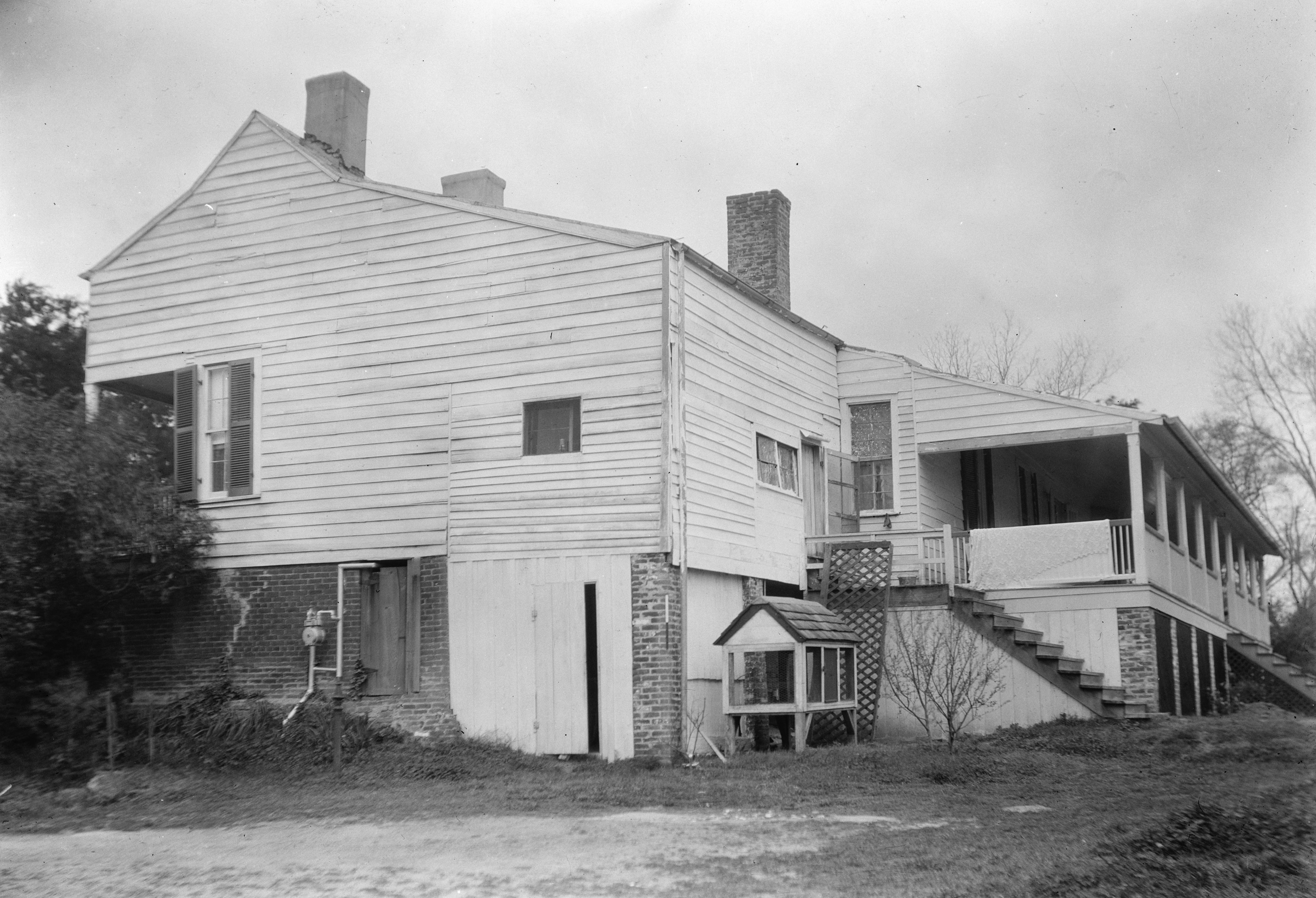

The house was built for Stephen Minor (1760–1815), a prominent plantation owner, in 1793. It is one of the oldest houses in Natchez, dating even to the Spanish colonial period. It was rebuilt in 1800 and was added to several times.

Owned by attorney, cotton planter, and slaveholding entrepreneur William Aylette Buckner before the Civil War. Used as a hospital for Union soldiers in Civil War.

It has been listed on the National Register of Historic Places since 1982. The listing included two contributing buildings and one contributing structure.
