= Natchez, Mississippi =

- City
- Pearl Street, Natchez

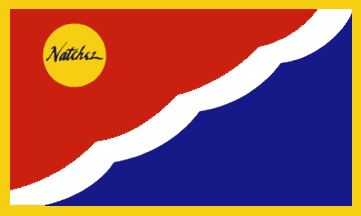
- Flag Seal
- Nicknames: The Bluff City, The Trace City, The River City, Antebellum Capital of the World, Historic Natchez on the Mississippi
- Motto: "On the Mighty Mississippi"
- Location of Natchez in Adams County
- Coordinates: 31°33′16″N 91°23′15″W
- Country: United States
- State: Mississippi
- County: Adams
- Founded: 1716 as Fort Rosalie, renamed Fort Panmure in 1763; Louisiana (New France)
- Established: c. 1790 as the capital of the Natchez District; Spanish West Florida
- Incorporated: March 10, 1803 (223 years ago)

Government
  - Mayor: Dan M. Gibson (D)

Area
  - City: 16.41 sq mi (42.49 km^{2})
  - Land: 15.81 sq mi (40.96 km^{2})
  - Water: 0.59 sq mi (1.53 km^{2})
- Elevation: 217 ft (66 m)

Population (2020)
  - City: 17,520
  - Estimate (2022): 13,812
  - Density: 918.1/sq mi (354.48/km^{2})
  - Urban: 25,902
  - Metro: 53,611 (US: 200th)
- Time zone: UTC-6 (Central (CST))
  - Summer (DST): UTC-5 (CDT)
- ZIP codes: 39120-39122
- Area code(s): 601 & 769
- FIPS code: 28-50440
- GNIS feature ID: 0691586
- Website: natchez.ms.us

Natchez (/ˈnætʃɪz/ NATCH-iz) is the only city in and the county seat of Adams County, Mississippi, United States. The population was 14,520 at the 2020 census. Located on the Mississippi River across from Vidalia, Louisiana, Natchez was a prominent city in the antebellum years, a center of cotton planters and Mississippi River trade.

Natchez is approximately 90 miles (140 km) southwest of the capital of Jackson and 85 miles (137 km) north of Baton Rouge, Louisiana, located on the lower Mississippi River. Natchez is the 28th-largest city in the state. The city was named for the Natchez people, who, with their ancestors, inhabited much of the area from the 8th century AD through the French colonial period.

== History ==
Established by French colonists in 1716, Natchez is one of the oldest and most important European settlements in the lower Mississippi River Valley. After the French lost the French and Indian War (Seven Years' War), they ceded Natchez and the surrounding territory to Great Britain in the Treaty of Paris of 1763. (It later traded other territory east of the Mississippi River with Great Britain, which expanded what it called West Florida.) The British Crown bestowed land grants in this territory to officers who had served with distinction in the war. These officers came mostly from the colonies of New York, New Jersey, and Pennsylvania. They established plantations and brought their upper-class lifestyle to the area.

Beginning in 1779, the area was under Spanish colonial rule. After defeat in the American Revolutionary War, Great Britain ceded the territory to the United States under the terms of the Treaty of Paris (1783). Spain was not a party to the treaty, and it was their forces who had taken Natchez from British troops. Although Spain had been allied with the American colonists, it was more interested in advancing its power at Britain's expense. Once the war was over, they were not inclined to give up that which they had acquired by force.

In 1797, Major Andrew Ellicott of the United States marched to the highest ridge in the young town of Natchez, set up camp, and raised the first American flag, claiming Natchez and all former Spanish lands east of the Mississippi above the 31st parallel for the United States.

After the United States acquired this area from the Spanish, the city served as the capital of the Mississippi Territory and then of the state of Mississippi. It predates Jackson by more than a century; the latter replaced Natchez as the capital in 1822, as it was more centrally located in the developing state. The strategic location of Natchez, on a bluff overlooking the Mississippi River, ensured that it would be a pivotal center of trade, commerce, and the interchange of ethnic Native American, European, and African cultures in the region; it held this position for two centuries after its founding.

In U.S. history, Natchez is recognized particularly for its role in the development of the Old Southwest during the first half of the 19th century. It was the southern terminus of the historic Natchez Trace, with the northern terminus being Nashville, Tennessee. After unloading their cargoes in Natchez or New Orleans, many pilots and crew of flatboats and keelboats traveled by the Trace overland to their homes in the Ohio River Valley. (Given the strong current of the Mississippi River, it was not until steam-powered vessels were developed in the 1820s that travel northward on the river could be accomplished by large boats.) The Natchez Trace also played an important role during the War of 1812. Today, the modern Natchez Trace Parkway, which commemorates this route, still has its southern terminus in Natchez.

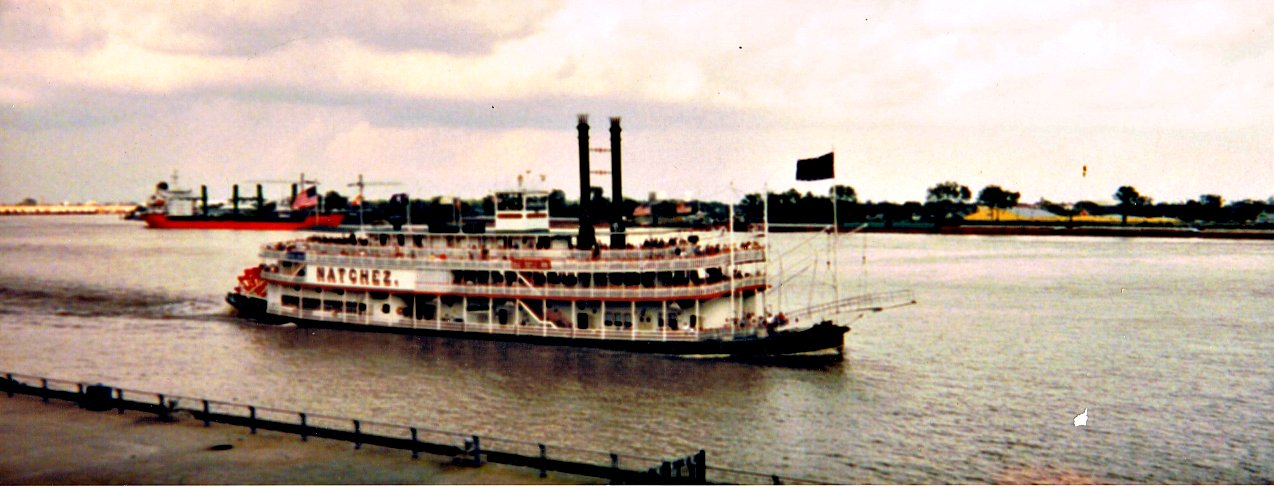
Steamboat Natchez operating out of New Orleans

In the decades preceding the Civil War, Natchez was by far the most infamous slave-trading city in Mississippi, and second in the United States only to New Orleans. The leading markets were located at the Forks of the Road, at the intersection of Liberty Road and Washington Road (now D'Evereux Drive and St. Catherine Street). In 1833, the most active enslavers in the United States, John Armfield and Isaac Franklin, began a program of arbitrage by buying enslaved people at low prices in the Middle Atlantic area and sending thousands to Deep South markets in Natchez and New Orleans. Their company, Franklin and Armfield, sent annual coffles from Virginia to the Forks of the Road in Natchez, and shipped others through New Orleans. Unlike other sellers of enslaved people of the day, Franklin and Armfield sold people individually, allowing buyers to survey them much like items in a modern retail store.

In 1840, the city was struck by a devastating tornado that killed 317 people and injured 109. It ranks today as the second-deadliest tornado in U.S. history, although the death toll may be higher because the deaths of enslaved people were not counted in the South at that time.

In the middle of the nineteenth century, the city attracted wealthy Southern planters as residents, who built mansions to fit their ambitions. Their plantations were vast tracts of land in the surrounding lowlands along the riverfronts of Mississippi and Louisiana, where they grew large commodity crops of cotton and sugarcane using the labor of enslaved people. Natchez became the principal port from which these crops were exported, both upriver to Northern cities and downriver to New Orleans, where much of the cargo was exported to Europe. Many of the mansions built by planters before 1860 survive and form a major part of the city's architecture and identity. Agriculture remained the primary economic base for the region until well into the twentieth century.

During the American Civil War, Natchez was surrendered by Confederate forces without a fight in September 1862. Following the Union victory at the Battle of Vicksburg in July 1863, many refugees, including formerly enslaved people, freed by the Emancipation Proclamation, began moving into Natchez and the surrounding countryside. The Union Army officers claimed to be short on resources and unable to provide for the refugees. The Army planned to address the situation with a mixture of paid labor for formerly enslaved people on government-leased plantations, the enlistment of non-disabled males who were willing to fight in the Union Army, and the establishment of refugee camps where formerly enslaved people could be provided with education. However, as the war continued, the plan was never effectively implemented, and the leased plantations were crowded, poorly managed, and frequently raided by Confederate troops who controlled the surrounding territory. Hundreds of people living in Natchez, including many formerly enslaved people and refugees, died of hunger, disease, overwork, or were killed in the fighting during this period. To attempt to manage the tens of thousands of formerly enslaved Black people, the Union Army created a refugee camp in Natchez in a natural pit known as the Devil's Punchbowl, where thousands died of starvation, smallpox, and other diseases.

After the American Civil War, the city's economy rapidly revived, largely because Natchez had been spared the destruction visited upon many other parts of the South. From 1870 to 1871, Robert H. Wood served as Mayor of Natchez; he was one of only five African Americans to serve as mayor during the Reconstruction era and one of the first black mayors in the country. Natchez was also home to politicians Hiram Rhodes Revels and John R. Lynch, both African Americans.

The municipality regulated transportation and commerce with Vidalia, Louisiana, by setting tariffs on goods and fares for the ferry, even providing a monthly rate for schoolchildren.

The vitality of the city and region was most vividly captured in the 80 years or so following the war by the photographers Henry C. Norman and his son, Earl. The output of the Norman Studio between roughly 1870 and 1950 vividly documents this period in Natchez's development; the photographs are now preserved as the Thomas and Joan Gandy Collection in the special collections of the Louisiana State University library in Baton Rouge.

During the twentieth century, the city's economy experienced a downturn, first due to the replacement of steamboat traffic on the Mississippi River by railroads in the early 1900s, some of which bypassed the river cities and drew away their commerce. Later in the 20th century, many local industries closed in a restructuring that sharply reduced the number of jobs in the area. Despite its status as a popular destination for heritage tourism due to its well-preserved antebellum architecture, Natchez has experienced a general population decline since 1960. It remains the principal city of the Natchez micropolitan area.

== Geography ==
According to the United States Census Bureau, the city has a total area of 13.9 square miles (36 km^{2}), of which 13.2 square miles (34 km^{2}) are land and 0.6 square miles (1.6 km^{2}) (4.62%) is water. The physical characteristics that control land use within the municipality are the natural drains, which locals call 'bayous', and the network of deep ravines across the landscape. The elevation of the Mississippi River at Natchez is approximately 46 feet (14 m), and the river gauge reference point for Natchez is 17.28 feet (5.27 m). The Natchez bluffs are composed of strata that might indicate a later geological event that cut a trench into the bluffs depositing a soil variation.

=== Climate ===
Natchez has a humid subtropical climate (Cfa) under the Köppen climate classification system.

Climate data for Natchez, Mississippi (1991–2020 normals, extremes 1892–present)
| Month | Jan | Feb | Mar | Apr | May | Jun | Jul | Aug | Sep | Oct | Nov | Dec | Year |
|---|---|---|---|---|---|---|---|---|---|---|---|---|---|
| Record high °F (°C) | 83 (28) | 86 (30) | 92 (33) | 92 (33) | 99 (37) | 103 (39) | 105 (41) | 105 (41) | 105 (41) | 98 (37) | 89 (32) | 89 (32) | 105 (41) |
| Mean maximum °F (°C) | 75.1 (23.9) | 78.4 (25.8) | 82.2 (27.9) | 85.9 (29.9) | 89.8 (32.1) | 93.0 (33.9) | 95.7 (35.4) | 96.1 (35.6) | 93.4 (34.1) | 88.7 (31.5) | 81.7 (27.6) | 77.3 (25.2) | 96.8 (36.0) |
| Mean daily maximum °F (°C) | 56.9 (13.8) | 60.9 (16.1) | 68.0 (20.0) | 75.1 (23.9) | 81.7 (27.6) | 87.3 (30.7) | 89.5 (31.9) | 89.3 (31.8) | 85.5 (29.7) | 76.9 (24.9) | 66.6 (19.2) | 58.9 (14.9) | 74.7 (23.7) |
| Daily mean °F (°C) | 46.4 (8.0) | 50.0 (10.0) | 57.3 (14.1) | 63.9 (17.7) | 71.7 (22.1) | 77.9 (25.5) | 80.4 (26.9) | 79.9 (26.6) | 75.1 (23.9) | 65.1 (18.4) | 54.8 (12.7) | 48.4 (9.1) | 64.2 (17.9) |
| Mean daily minimum °F (°C) | 35.9 (2.2) | 39.0 (3.9) | 46.5 (8.1) | 52.7 (11.5) | 61.6 (16.4) | 68.5 (20.3) | 71.3 (21.8) | 70.5 (21.4) | 64.7 (18.2) | 53.2 (11.8) | 43.0 (6.1) | 37.9 (3.3) | 53.7 (12.1) |
| Mean minimum °F (°C) | 20.3 (−6.5) | 24.4 (−4.2) | 28.6 (−1.9) | 36.6 (2.6) | 47.0 (8.3) | 59.5 (15.3) | 65.3 (18.5) | 63.9 (17.7) | 51.5 (10.8) | 36.8 (2.7) | 27.5 (−2.5) | 23.4 (−4.8) | 18.5 (−7.5) |
| Record low °F (°C) | 4 (−16) | 4 (−16) | 18 (−8) | 28 (−2) | 30 (−1) | 49 (9) | 55 (13) | 50 (10) | 40 (4) | 27 (−3) | 18 (−8) | 5 (−15) | 4 (−16) |
| Average precipitation inches (mm) | 6.23 (158) | 5.54 (141) | 6.03 (153) | 4.90 (124) | 4.69 (119) | 4.48 (114) | 4.47 (114) | 4.87 (124) | 4.14 (105) | 4.04 (103) | 5.08 (129) | 5.66 (144) | 60.13 (1,527) |
| Average snowfall inches (cm) | 0.1 (0.25) | 0.0 (0.0) | 0.0 (0.0) | 0.0 (0.0) | 0.0 (0.0) | 0.0 (0.0) | 0.0 (0.0) | 0.0 (0.0) | 0.0 (0.0) | 0.0 (0.0) | 0.0 (0.0) | 0.2 (0.51) | 0.3 (0.76) |
| Average precipitation days (≥ 0.01 in) | 11.2 | 10.4 | 9.9 | 8.3 | 9.2 | 9.9 | 10.6 | 10.2 | 7.2 | 6.7 | 7.8 | 10.3 | 111.7 |
| Average snowy days (≥ 0.1 in) | 0.1 | 0.0 | 0.0 | 0.0 | 0.0 | 0.0 | 0.0 | 0.0 | 0.0 | 0.0 | 0.0 | 0.0 | 0.1 |
Source: NOAA

== Demographics ==
Historical population
| Census | Pop. | Note | %± |
|---|---|---|---|
| 1810 | 1,511 | | — |
| 1820 | 2,184 | | 44.5% |
| 1830 | 2,789 | | 27.7% |
| 1840 | 3,612 | | 29.5% |
| 1850 | 4,434 | | 22.8% |
| 1860 | 6,612 | | 49.1% |
| 1870 | 9,057 | | 37.0% |
| 1880 | 7,058 | | −22.1% |
| 1890 | 10,101 | | 43.1% |
| 1900 | 12,210 | | 20.9% |
| 1910 | 11,791 | | −3.4% |
| 1920 | 12,608 | | 6.9% |
| 1930 | 13,422 | | 6.5% |
| 1940 | 15,296 | | 14.0% |
| 1950 | 22,740 | | 48.7% |
| 1960 | 23,791 | | 4.6% |
| 1970 | 19,704 | | −17.2% |
| 1980 | 22,015 | | 11.7% |
| 1990 | 19,535 | | −11.3% |
| 2000 | 18,464 | | −5.5% |
| 2010 | 15,792 | | −14.5% |
| 2020 | 14,520 | | −8.1% |
| 2022 (est.) | 13,812 | | −4.9% |
U.S. Decennial Census; 2020 Census

=== Racial and ethnic composition ===
Natchez city, Mississippi – Racial and ethnic composition Note: the US Census treats Hispanic/Latino as an ethnic category. This table excludes Latinos from the racial categories and assigns them to a separate category. Hispanics/Latinos may be of any race.
| Race / Ethnicity (NH = Non-Hispanic) | Pop 2000 | Pop 2010 | Pop 2020 | % 2000 | % 2010 | % 2020 |
|---|---|---|---|---|---|---|
| White alone (NH) | 8,108 | 6,185 | 5,156 | 43.91% | 39.17% | 35.51% |
| Black or African American alone (NH) | 10,020 | 9,176 | 8,729 | 54.27% | 58.11% | 60.12% |
| Native American or Alaska Native alone (NH) | 20 | 31 | 16 | 0.11% | 0.20% | 0.11% |
| Asian alone (NH) | 71 | 59 | 73 | 0.38% | 0.37% | 0.50% |
| Native Hawaiian or Pacific Islander alone (NH) | 3 | 0 | 2 | 0.02% | 0.00% | 0.01% |
| Other race alone (NH) | 4 | 16 | 13 | 0.02% | 0.10% | 0.09% |
| Mixed race or Multiracial (NH) | 108 | 146 | 330 | 0.58% | 0.92% | 2.27% |
| Hispanic or Latino (any race) | 130 | 179 | 201 | 0.70% | 1.13% | 1.38% |
| Total | 18,464 | 15,792 | 14,520 | 100.00% | 100.00% | 100.00% |

=== 2020 census ===
As of the 2020 census, there were 14,520 people, 6,028 households, and 3,149 families residing in the city. The median age was 43.2 years. 22.0% of residents were under the age of 18, and 22.7% of residents were 65 years of age or older. For every 100 females there were 83.4 males, and for every 100 females age 18 and over there were 78.9 males age 18 and over.

98.4% of residents lived in urban areas, while 1.6% lived in rural areas.

Of households, 26.3% had children under the age of 18 living in them. Of all households, 26.7% were married-couple households, 21.4% were households with a male householder and no spouse or partner present, and 46.3% were households with a female householder and no spouse or partner present. About 39.0% of all households were made up of individuals, and 17.9% had someone living alone who was 65 years of age or older.

There were 7,901 housing units, of which 16.8% were vacant. The homeowner vacancy rate was 4.5%, and the rental vacancy rate was 10.4%.

=== 2000 census ===
As of the census of 2000, there were 18,464 people, 7,591 households, and 4,858 families residing in the city. The population density was 1,398.3 inhabitants per square mile (539.9/km^{2}). There were 8,479 housing units at an average density of 642.1 per square mile (247.9/km^{2}).

In 2000, the racial and ethnic makeup of the city was 54.49% African American, 44.18% White, 0.38% Asian, 0.11% Native American, 0.02% Pacific Islander, 0.18% from other races, and 0.63% from two or more races. 0.70% of the population were Hispanic or Latino of any race.

== Economy ==
Adams County Correctional Center, a private prison operated by the Corrections Corporation of America on behalf of the Federal Bureau of Prisons, is in an unincorporated area in Adams County, near Natchez.

== Education ==
Natchez is home to Alcorn State University's Natchez Campus, which offers the School of Nursing, the School of Business, and graduate business programs. The School of Business offers a Master of Business Administration (MBA) degree and other business classes from its Natchez campus. The MBA program attracts students from a wide range of academic disciplines and preparation from the Southwest Mississippi area and beyond offering concentrations in general business, gaming management and hospitality management. Both schools in the Natchez campus provide skills which has enabled community students to have an important impact on the economic opportunities of people in Southwest Mississippi.

Copiah-Lincoln Community College also operates a campus in Natchez. Adams County is in the district of Copiah–Lincoln Community College and has been since 1971.

The city of Natchez and Adams County are in the boundary of one public school system, the Natchez-Adams School District. The district comprises ten schools. They are Susie B. West, Morgantown, Gilmer McLaurin, Joseph F. Frazier, Robert Lewis Magnet School, Natchez Freshman Academy, Natchez Early College@Co-Lin, Central Alternative School, Natchez High School, and Fallin Career and Technology Center.

In Natchez, there are some private and parochial schools. Adams County Christian School (ACCS) is also a PK-12 school in the city. Adams County Christian School was founded as a segregation academy and is a member of the Mississippi Association of Independent Schools (MAIS). Cathedral School is also a PK-12 school in the city. It is affiliated with the Roman Catholic St. Mary Basilica. Holy Family Catholic School, founded in 1890, is a PK-3 school affiliated with Holy Family Catholic Church.

== Media ==
=== Newspaper ===
- The Natchez Democrat

=== Television ===
Natchez is among the television markets in Alexandria, Louisiana, and Jackson, Mississippi.

== Transportation ==
=== Highways ===
U.S. 61 runs north–south, parallel to the Mississippi River, linking Natchez with Port Gibson, Woodville, Mississippi and Baton Rouge, Louisiana.

U.S. 84 runs east–west and bridges the Mississippi, connecting it with Vidalia, Louisiana, and Brookhaven, Mississippi.

U.S. 425 runs north from Natchez after crossing the Mississippi, connecting Ferriday with Clayton. At this point, U.S. 65 follows the west bank of the Mississippi, connecting to Waterproof north to St. Joseph, Newellton, and Tallulah, Louisiana.

U.S. 98 runs east from Natchez towards Bude and McComb, Mississippi.

Mississippi 555 runs north from the center of Natchez to where it joins Mississippi Highway 554.

Mississippi 554 runs from the north side of the city to where it joins Highway 61, northeast of town.

=== Rail ===
Natchez is served by the Natchez Railway, which interchanges with Canadian National.

=== Air ===
Natchez is served by the Natchez-Adams County Airport, a general aviation facility.

== Notable people ==
- Robert H. Adams, former United States senator from Mississippi
- William Wirt Adams, Confederate States Army officer, grew up in Natchez
- Philip Alston, prominent plantation owner and early American outlaw
- Glen Ballard, five-time Grammy Award-winning songwriter/producer
- Pierre A. Barker, former Mayor of Buffalo, New York
- Campbell Brown, Emmy Award-winning journalist, political anchor for CNN; grew up in Natchez and attended both Trinity Episcopal and Cathedral High School
- Nathaniel L. Carpenter, businessman
- John J. Chanche, first Roman Catholic bishop of Natchez, buried on the grounds of St. Mary Basilica, Natchez
- George Henry Clinton, member of both houses of the Louisiana State Legislature in the first quarter of the 20th century, born in Natchez in the late 1860s
- Charles C. Cordill, Louisiana state senator from Concordia and Tensas parishes, interred at Natchez City Cemetery
- Charles G. Dahlgren, Confederate brigadier general during the American Civil War
- Olu Dara, musician and father of rapper Nas
- Varina Howell Davis, first lady of the Confederate States of America; born, reared, and married in Natchez
- Bob Dearing, longtime member of the Mississippi State Senate
- Ellen Douglas, novelist, author of Black Cloud, White Cloud and Apostles of Light, nominated for the National Book Award
- A. W. Dumas (1876–1945), physician
- Stephen Duncan (1787–1867), planter and banker
- Robert C. Farrell (born 1936), journalist and member of the Los Angeles City Council, 1974–1991
- Je'Kel Foster, basketball player
- Jimmie Giles, NFL Tight End & four-time Pro Bowl selection in the 1980s while with the Tampa Bay Buccaneers
- Mickey Gilley, country music singer, born in Natchez
- Hugh Green, All-American defensive end at the University of Pittsburgh, two-time Pro Bowler, Heisman runner-up
- Elizabeth Taylor Greenfield, noted black concert singer and Mississippi Musicians Hall of Fame inductee, was born in Natchez in 1824.
- Cedric Griffin, Minnesota Vikings cornerback born in Natchez but raised in San Antonio, Texas
- Bishop Gunn, rock and roll band whose members were born in Natchez and hold 'The Bishop Gunn Crawfish Boil' in the city every May
- Malcolm Harvey, former sheriff of Stone Mountain, Georgia and murderer, was born in Natchez
- Margaret Kempe Howell, mother of Varina Davis and mother-in-law of Jefferson Davis, lived in Natchez
- Abijah Hunt, merchant during the Territorial Period who owned a chain of stores and public cotton gins along the Natchez Trace
- Von Hutchins, former NFL football player for the Indianapolis Colts 2004–2005 Houston Texans 2006-2007Atlanta Falcons 2008
- Greg Iles, raised in Natchez and a best-selling author of many novels set in the city
- Wharlest Jackson, Sr. (1929–1967), civil rights activist
- Rosa Vertner Jeffrey (1828–1894), poet and novelist
- William Johnson, "The Barber of Natchez", freed slave and prominent businessman
- Harriet B. Kells, educator, activist, suffragist, feminist, editor; born in Natchez
- Nook Logan, former Major League Baseball player for the Washington Nationals
- John R. Lynch, the first African-American Speaker of the House in Mississippi and one of the earliest African-American members of Congress
- Samuel Abraham Marx, architect, was born in Natchez
- George Mathews, former governor of Georgia, lived in Natchez in the late 1790s.
- Carrie Winder McGavock, Confederate cemetery caretaker
- Lynda Lee Mead, Miss Mississippi in 1959 and Miss America in 1960; a Natchez city street, Lynda Lee Drive, is named in her honor
- Katherine Grafton Miller, founder of the Natchez Pilgrimage
- Marion Montgomery, jazz singer born in Natchez
- Anne Moody, civil rights activist and author of Coming of Age in Mississippi, attended Natchez Junior College
- Elizabeth Dunbar Murray (1877–1966), author, director, impersonator; conducted the Murray School of Expression
- Alexander O'Neal, R&B singer
- John Anthony Quitman, Mexican War hero, plantation owner, governor of Mississippi, owner of Monmouth Plantation
- Clyde V. Ratcliff, member of the Louisiana State Senate from 1944 to 1948, lived in Natchez
- Rico Richardson, NFL player
- Stevan Ridley, NFL running back for the New England Patriots
- Pierre Adolphe Rost, a member of the Mississippi State Senate and commissioner to Europe for the Confederate States, immigrated to Natchez from France
- Billy Shaw, Pro Football Hall of Fame member, born in Natchez
- Chris Shivers, two-time PBR world champion bull rider, born in Natchez
- Carter Smith, film director and fashion photographer
- Abdul Rahman Ibrahima Sori, African nobleman sold into slavery and sent to work a plantation in Natchez, Mississippi, for thirty-eight years before being freed at the request of Abd al-Rahman, the Sultan of Morocco
- Hound Dog Taylor, blues singer and slide guitar player
- Fred Toliver, former pitcher for the Philadelphia Phillies and the Minnesota Twins
- Don José Vidal, Spanish governor of the Natchez District, buried in the Natchez City Cemetery
- Joanna Fox Waddill, Civil War nurse known as the "Florence Nightingale of the Confederacy"
- Samuel Washington Weis (1870–1956), painter
- Marie Selika Williams, first black artist to perform at the White House
- Richard Wright, novelist, author of Black Boy and Native Son, born on Rucker plantation in Roxie, twenty-two miles east of Natchez; lived in Natchez as a child
- Robert H. Wood (1844–?), politician, first African American mayor in the United States, former mayor of Natchez

== In popular culture ==
Various movies have been shot here, including The Autobiography of Miss Jane Pittman (1974), Crossroads (1986), Raintree County (1957), Horse Soldiers (1959), Rascals and Robbers: The Secret Adventures of Tom Sawyer and Huckleberry Finn (1981), The Ladykillers (2004), Get On Up (2014) and Ma (film) (2019).

In the opening narration of The Apartment (1960), C.C. Baxter mentions the company he works for "has 31,259 employees, which is more than the entire population of Natchez, Mississippi."

Ta-Nehisi Coates' 2019 novel, The Water Dancer, alludes constantly to the threat, in antebellum Virginia, represented to enslaved people by the possibility of being sold "down Natchez way," that is, into the harshest slavery.

Natchez (2025), directed by Suzannah Herbert, is a documentary that explores the unreconciled history of the city by following the lives of various people living and working in Natchez.

== Historic sites ==
=== Post-classical through Early modern periods ===
- Anna site
- Grand Village of the Natchez

=== Antebellum period ===
- Commercial Bank and Banker's House
- First Presbyterian Church of Natchez
- Great Natchez Tornado
- Natchez Museum of African American History and Culture
- Natchez National Cemetery
- Natchez On-Top-of-the-Hill Historic District
- Selma Plantation
- St. Mary Basilica, Natchez
- United States Courthouse (Natchez, Mississippi)

==== Pre-Civil War homes ====
- Airlie (Natchez)
- Arlington (Natchez, Mississippi)
- Auburn (Natchez, Mississippi)
- Brandon Hall (Washington, Mississippi)
- The Briars (Natchez, Mississippi)
- The Burn (Natchez, Mississippi)
- Concord (Natchez, Mississippi)
- Cottage Gardens
- D'Evereux
- Dunleith
- Elgin (Natchez, Mississippi)
- The Elms (Natchez, Mississippi)
- Elms Court
- Glenfield Plantation
- Gloucester (Natchez, Mississippi)
- Hawthorne Place
- Homewood Plantation (Natchez, Mississippi)
- Hope Farm (Natchez, Mississippi)
- Lansdowne (Natchez, Mississippi)
- Linden (Natchez, Mississippi)
- Longwood (Natchez, Mississippi)
- Magnolia Hill (Natchez, Mississippi)
- Melrose (Natchez, Mississippi)
- Monmouth (Natchez, Mississippi)
- Montaigne (Natchez, Mississippi)
- Ravenna (Natchez, Mississippi)
- Richmond (Natchez, Mississippi)
- Routhland

==== Town houses ====
- Choctaw
- Green Leaves
- House on Ellicott's Hill
- King's Tavern
- The Presbyterian Manse
- Magnolia Hall (Natchez, Mississippi)
- Rosalie Mansion
- Smith-Bontura-Evans House
- Stanton Hall
- William Johnson House (Natchez, Mississippi)
- Winchester House (Natchez, Mississippi)
