= Natchez On-Top-of-the-Hill Historic District =

Historic district in Mississippi, United States

- U.S. National Register of Historic Places
- U.S. Historic district
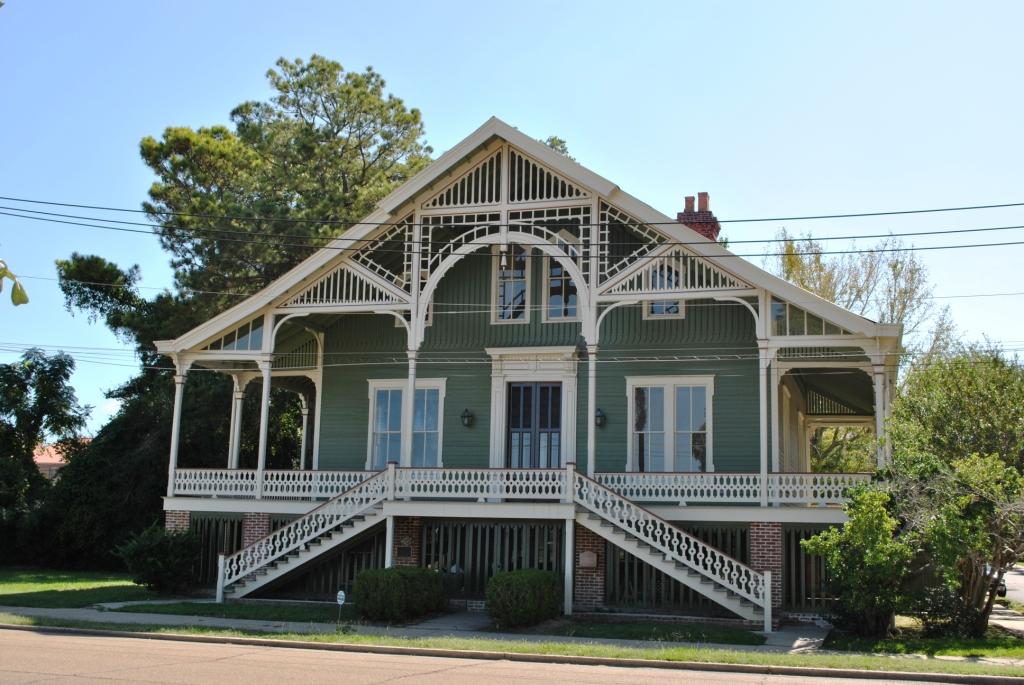
- Swiss Chalet style "Edelweiss", at 209 S. Broadway

- Location within Mississippi Location within the United States
- Location: Natchez, Mississippi
- Architect: Multiple
- Architectural style: Greek Revival, Late Victorian
- NRHP reference No.: 79003381
- Added to NRHP: September 17, 1979

Natchez On-Top-of-the-Hill Historic District is a historic district in Natchez, Mississippi that was listed on the National Register of Historic Places in 1979.

== History ==
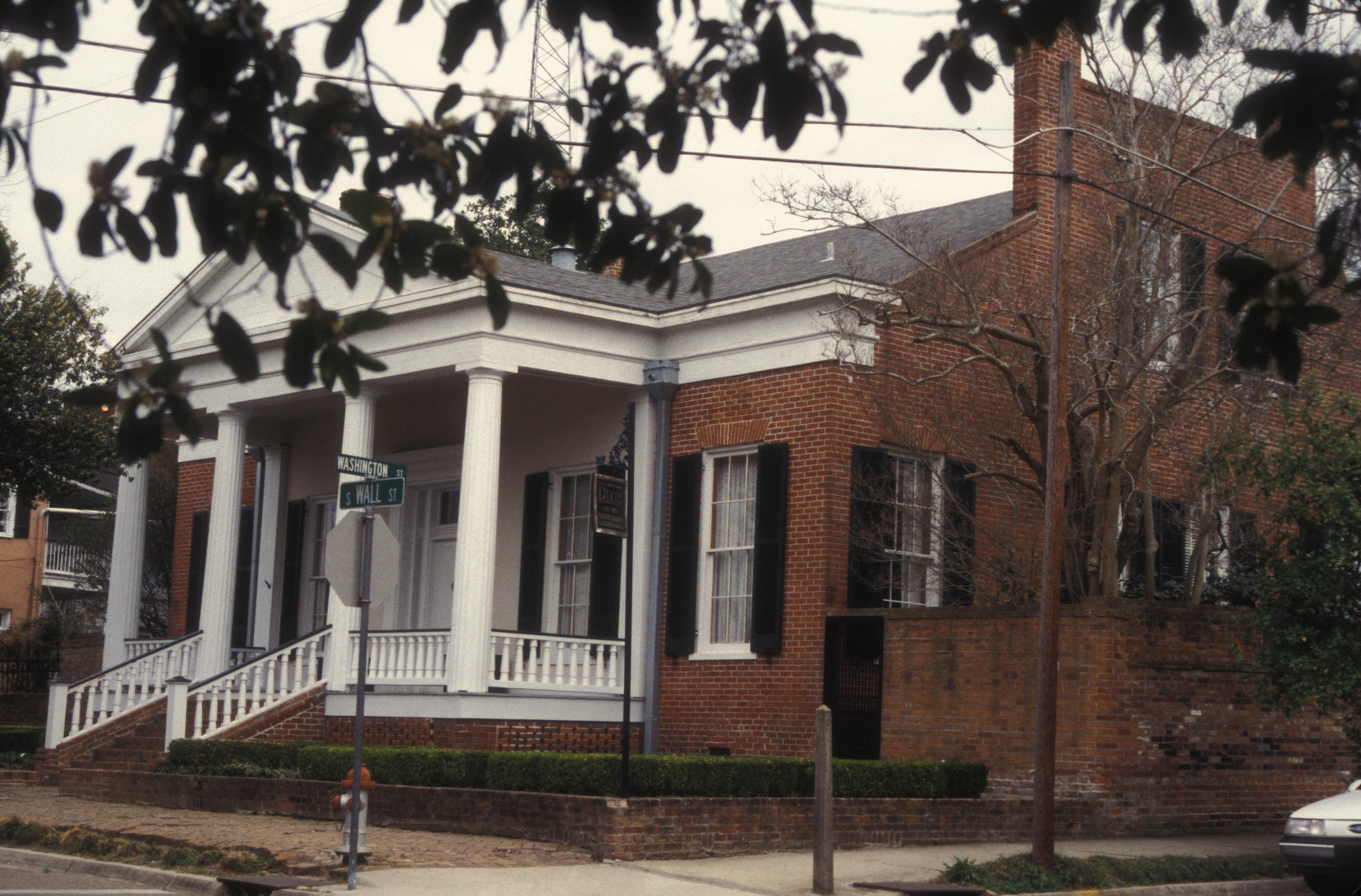

Architecturally, the district includes a set of Greek Revival works that are of national-level significance, and many other styles including Late Victorian architecture. It has what is assessed to be the best Swiss Chalet Style work in Mississippi and it also has the best residential French Second Empire style work in Mississippi.

Important sites within the district include:

- Andrew Marschalk's printing office where the first book printed in Mississippi was printed in 1799,
- the first bank in Mississippi,
- the site of American flag-raising, in 1798, by Andrew Ellicott near the House on Ellicott's Hill, and
- the traditional location of the earliest Sunday school south of Philadelphia, conducted at a Methodist church.

== List of National Historic Landmark designated sites ==
It includes National Historic Landmark-designated sites:

- House on Ellicott's Hill
- Stanton Hall
- Rosalie
- Commercial Bank and Banker's House (c. 1837), consisting of the Commercial Bank Building, a "one-story three-bay stuccoed brick with stone facade commercial building of two-story height with Ionic portico," and the connected Greek Revival style.

== List of contributing properties and pivotal properties ==
Other sites individually listed on the National Register include:

- King's Tavern (1769), 611 Jefferson Street
- The Elms (c. 1805), 801 Washington Street
- Adams County Courthouse (c. 1820), 201 S. Wall Street; considered one of the district's "pivotal" contributing buildings, a two-story Federal-style brick courthouse with a cupola. It was remodeled c. 1920 into Colonial Revival style with classical porticos.
- Presbyterian Manse (c. 1830), 307 S. Rankin Street
- Winchester House (1835), 816 Main Street
- Choctaw (c. 1835), NRHP-listed as Neibert-Fisk House
- The Barnes House (c. 1836)
- First Presbyterian Church (1830), 117 S. Pearl Street
- John Baynton House, (c. 1833), 821 Main Street, NRHP-listed; also known as "Williamsburg"
- Trinity Episcopal Church (1822), Greek Revival, 305 Commerce Street South
- Green Leaves (1838), 303 S. Rankin Street; Greek Revival with doric columns
- William Johnson House (1841) Greek Revival
- Melrose (1848), 1 Melrose-Montebello Parkway
- Magnolia Hall (1858), 215 S. Pearl Street; NRHP-listed as the Henderson-Britton House
- Longwood (c. 1859), 140 Lower Woodville Road
- Glen Auburn (c. 1875), 300 S Commerce Street; built by Christian Schwartz, described as "probably the most outstanding of the post-Civil War houses" in the district and as "the best example of the Second Empire style in the state of Mississippi."
- St. Mary's Cathedral (1882), 107 S. Union Street; also known as St. Mary Basilica
- Prentiss Club (1904), 211 N. Pearl Street; a yellow brick building in Second Renaissance Revival style, designed by New Orleans architects Soule and McDonald
- Temple B'nai Israel (1905), 213 South Commerce Street
- Stratton Chapel of the First Presbyterian Church (1909)

Notable sites

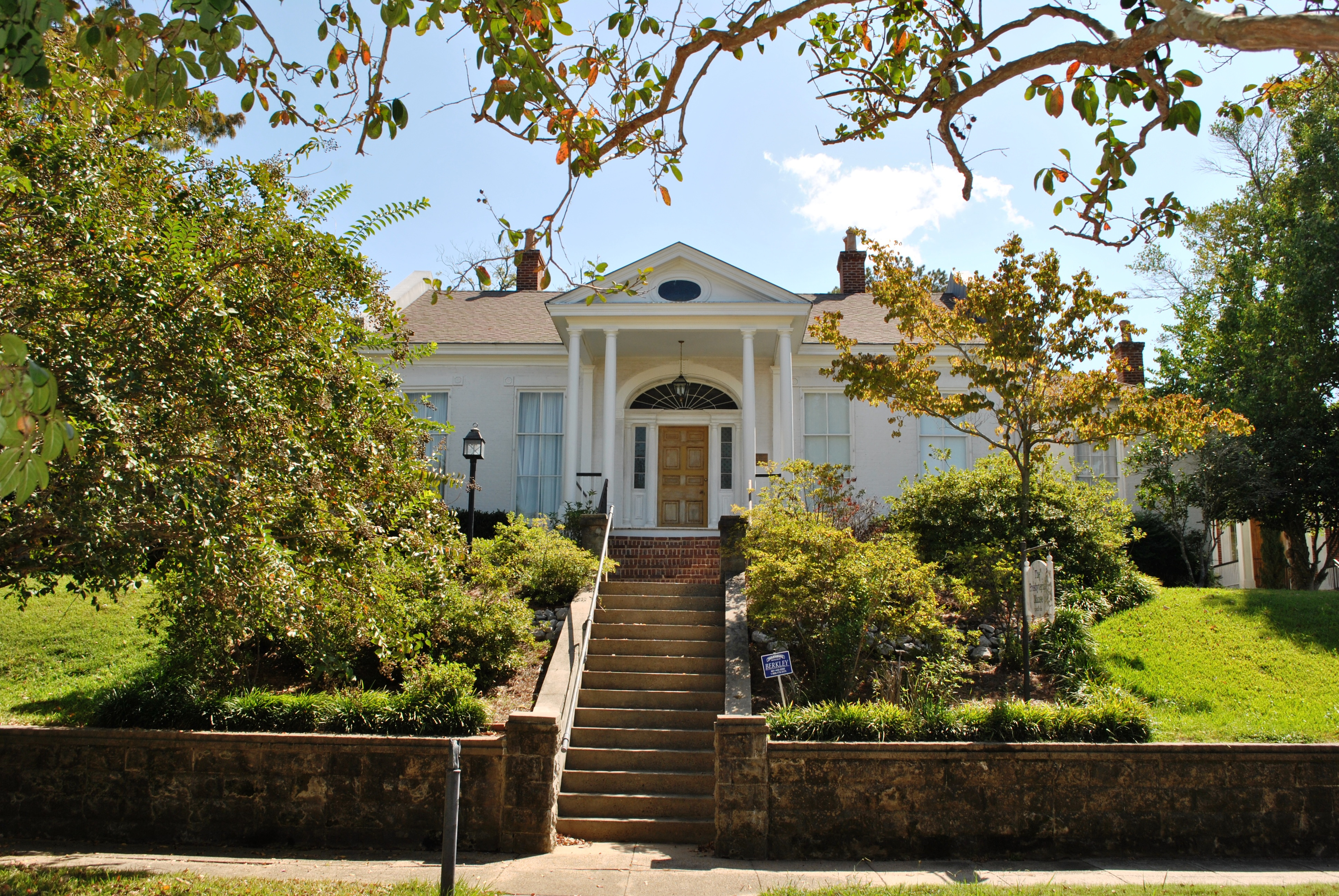
The Manse

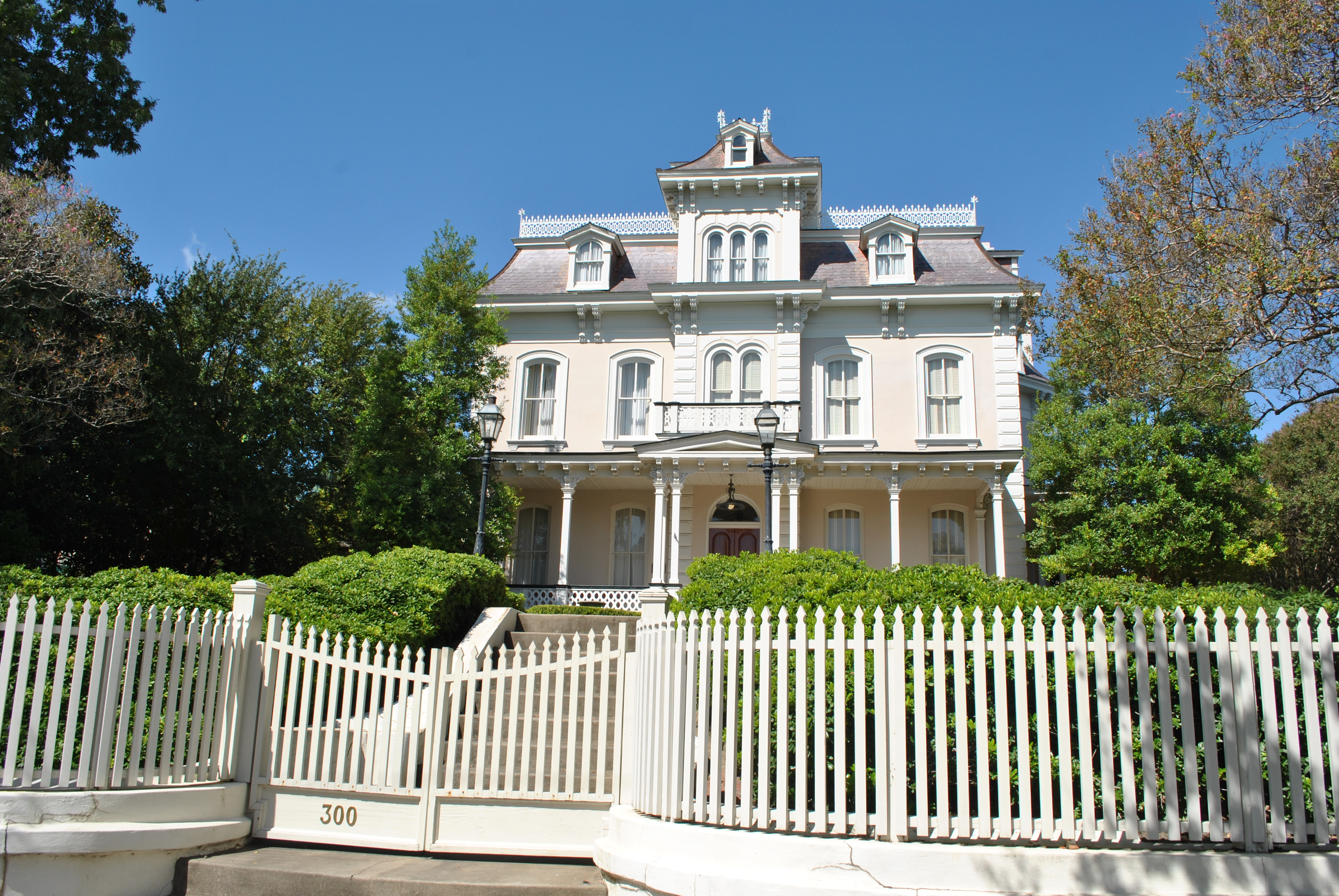
Glen Auburn

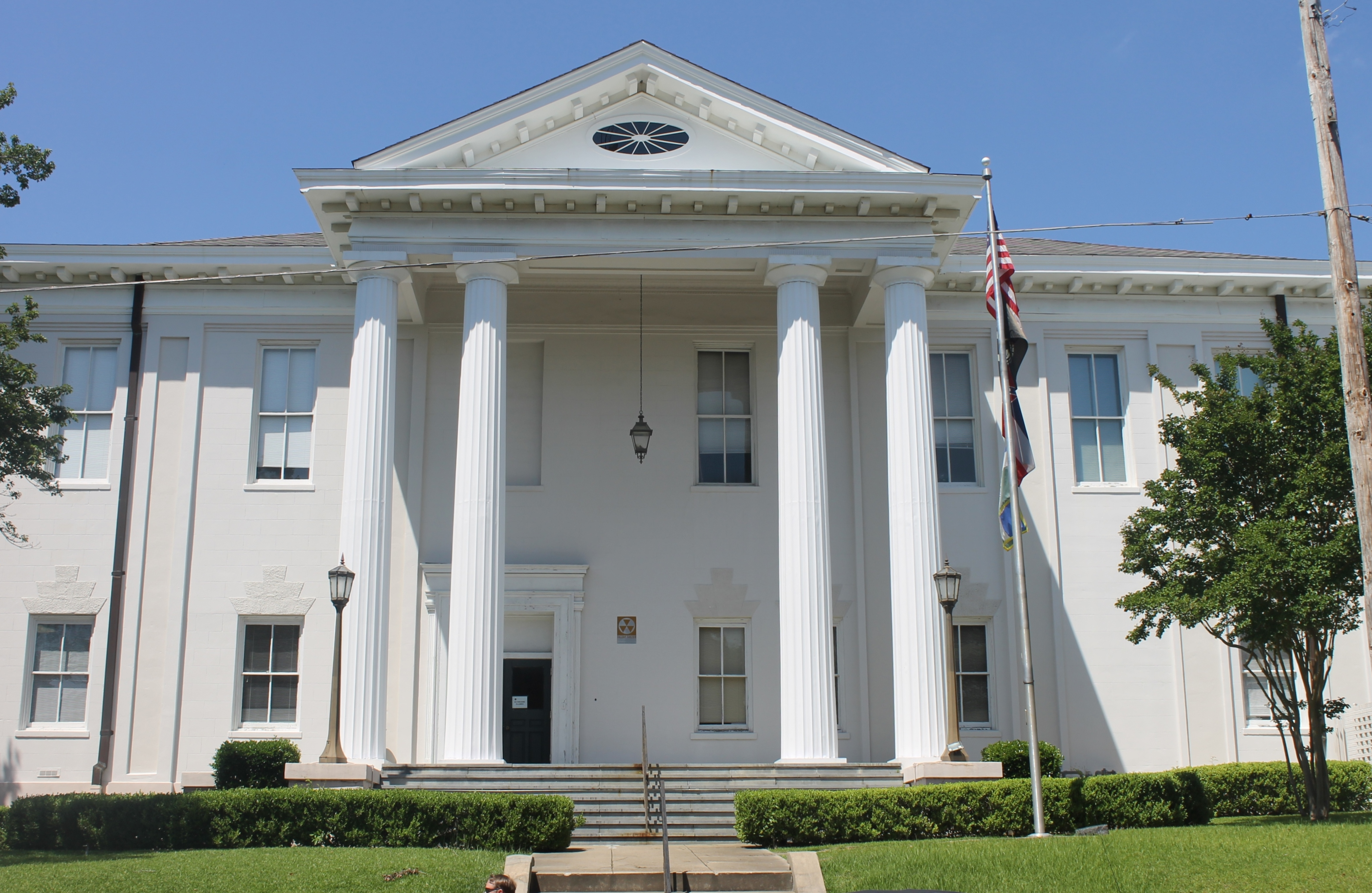
Adams County Courthouse

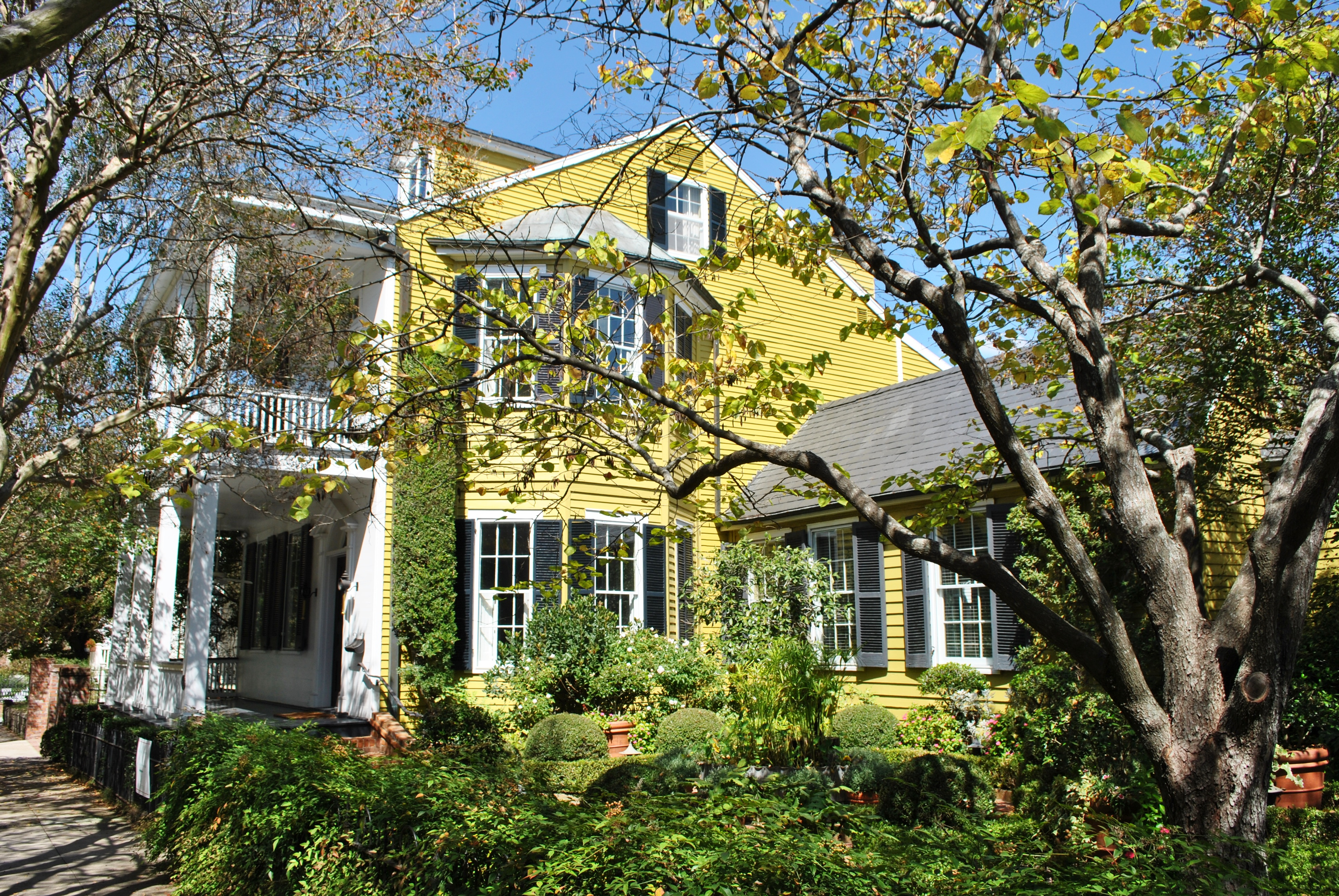
The Barnes House

A map delineating the area of the district, including a rectangle defined by Monroe, Pine, Orleans, and Broadway, but also a bit more, is provided in its 1979 NRHP nomination document.

== See also ==
There are several other NRHP-listed historic districts in Natchez:

- Downriver Residential Historic District, adjacent on the south below Orleans St.
- Natchez Bluffs and Under-the-Hill Historic District, adjacent to the river side
- Upriver Residential District, adjacent on the north, above Monroe St.
- Holy Family Catholic Church Historic District, adjacent, on the west
- Clifton Heights Historic District, on the river side of the Upriver Residential District
- Cemetery Bluff District
- Woodlawn Historic District
