= Cemetery Bluff District =

Historic district in Mississippi, United States

- U.S. National Register of Historic Places
- U.S. Historic district
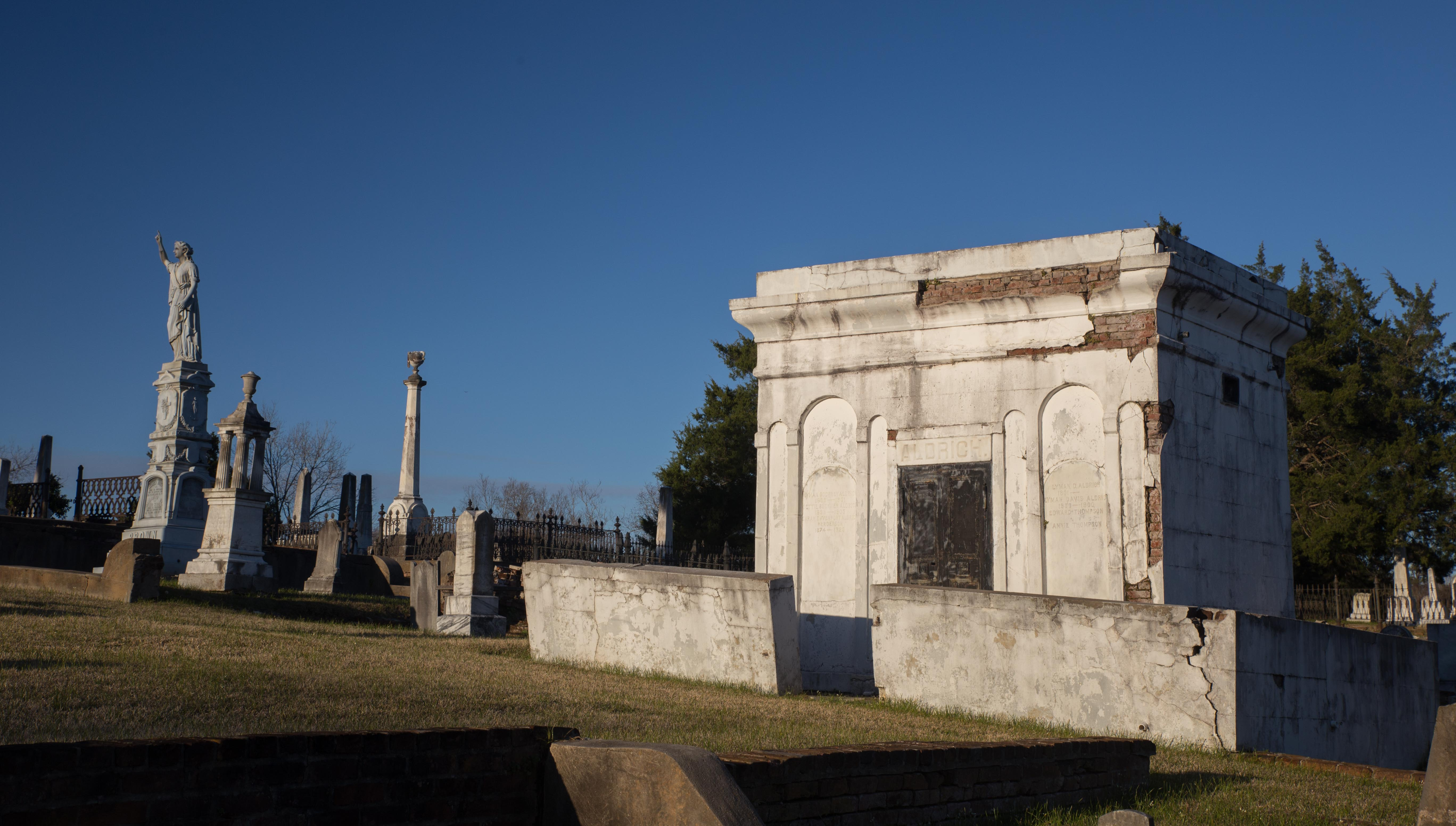

- Location within Mississippi Location within the United States
- Location: Cemetery Rd., Natchez, Mississippi
- Coordinates: 31°34′37″N 91°23′39″W
- Area: 120 acres (49 ha)
- Architect: Multiple
- Architectural style: Victorian
- NRHP reference No.: 80002192
- Added to NRHP: October 24, 1980

The Cemetery Bluff District, on Cemetery Rd. in Natchez, Mississippi, is a 120-acre (49 ha) historic district that was listed on the National Register of Historic Places in 1980. It includes a mix of Victorian architectural styles.

The district comprises twenty-five contributing properties: eighteen buildings, five other structures, and two sites. It consists of the Natchez City Cemetery at the southern end, the Natchez National Cemetery at the northern, and properties along Cemetery Road in between. Cemetery Road also is known as Maple Street on portions in the county vs. in the Natchez city limits.

== See also ==
There are several other NRHP-listed historic districts in Natchez:

- Woodlawn Historic District (Natchez, Mississippi), a historically black neighborhood historic district (HD)
- Holy Family Catholic Church Historic District, another historically black neighborhood HD
- Upriver Residential District, adjacent to the Woodlawn HD, on the west
- Natchez On-Top-of-the-Hill Historic District, south of Upriver HD
- Natchez Bluffs and Under-the-Hill Historic District, on river side of On-Top-of-the-Hill HD
- Downriver Residential Historic District, further south below the On-Top-of-the-Hill HD
- Clifton Heights Historic District, on the river side of the Upriver HD
