= Woodlawn Historic District (Natchez, Mississippi) =

Historic district in Mississippi, United States

- U.S. National Register of Historic Places
- U.S. Historic district
- Location within Mississippi Location within the United States
- Location: Roughly bounded by Martin Luther King St., E. Stiers and Old College Lns., Elm and Bishop Sts., Natchez, Mississippi
- Coordinates: 31°34′3″N 91°23′24″W
- Area: 97 acres (39 ha)
- Built: 1885
- Architectural style: Italianate, Gothic Revival, Colonial Revival
- NRHP reference No.: 95001250
- Added to NRHP: November 7, 1995

The Woodlawn Historic District in Natchez, Mississippi is a 97-acre (39 ha) historic district that was listed on the United States National Register of Historic Places in 1995. The listing included 360 contributing buildings.

Woodlawn was an estate owned by the Beaumont family that was subdivided in 1867 into building lots which were sold to African-Americans. This original area is bounded by what is now Bishop St., N. Union, Martin Luther King St., and Woodlawn St. The district is significant for associations with African-American history, community planning and development, and also for its architecture. It includes the location of Natchez College, founded in 1885, and the Prince Street School, built in 1913.

Noted author Richard Wright grew up partly at the home of his grandparents Richard and Margaret Wilson, at 20 Woodlawn Avenue, in the district, and he later drew upon his childhood memories of there in his writing.

The district includes vernacular architecture with Italianate, Gothic Revival, Colonial Revival, and other architectural style elements.

== See also ==
There are several other NRHP-listed historic districts in Natchez:

- Holy Family Catholic Church Historic District, another historically black neighborhood historic district (HD)
- Upriver Residential District, adjacent to the Woodlawn HD, on the west
- Natchez On-Top-of-the-Hill Historic District, south of Upriver HD
- Natchez Bluffs and Under-the-Hill Historic District, on river side of On-Top-of-the-Hill HD
- Downriver Residential Historic District, further south below the On-Top-of-the-Hill HD
- Clifton Heights Historic District, on the river side of the Upriver HD
- Cemetery Bluff District
