= Upriver Residential District =

Historic district in Mississippi, United States

- U.S. National Register of Historic Places
- U.S. Historic district
- Location within Mississippi Location within the United States
- Location: Roughly bounded by Pine, Monroe, Elm-Bishop, and Ridge-Maple Sts., Natchez, Mississippi
- Coordinates: 31°34′00″N 91°23′49″W
- Area: 145 acres (59 ha)
- Built: 1790
- Architect: Multiple
- Architectural style: Colonial Revival, Late Victorian, Queen Anne
- NRHP reference No.: 83004371
- Added to NRHP: December 1, 1983

The Upriver Residential District is a 145-acre (59 ha) historic district in Natchez, Mississippi that was listed on the U.S. National Register of Historic Places in 1983. It includes Colonial Revival, Late Victorian, Queen Anne, and other architecture, and has significance dating to 1790. It includes 389 contributing buildings. Its border was defined, on the south and west, by the borders of the already-NRHP-listed Natchez On-Top-of-the-Hill Historic District (essentially Monroe Street) and the Downriver Residential Historic District.

It includes the John Dicks House, which is believed to be the only work of McKim, Mead, and White in Mississippi and "one of the most outstanding Colonial Revival buildings in the state."

== See also ==
There are several other NRHP-listed historic districts in Natchez:

- Clifton Heights Historic District, adjacent on the river side
- Natchez On-Top-of-the-Hill Historic District, adjacent on the south, below Monroe St.
- Downriver Residential Historic District, further south below the On-Top-of-the-Hill district
- Natchez Bluffs and Under-the-Hill Historic District, on river side of On-Top-of-the-Hill
- Cemetery Bluff District
- Holy Family Catholic Church Historic District
- Woodlawn Historic District
