= Holy Family Catholic Church Historic District =

Historic church in Mississippi, United States

- U.S. National Register of Historic Places
- U.S. Historic district
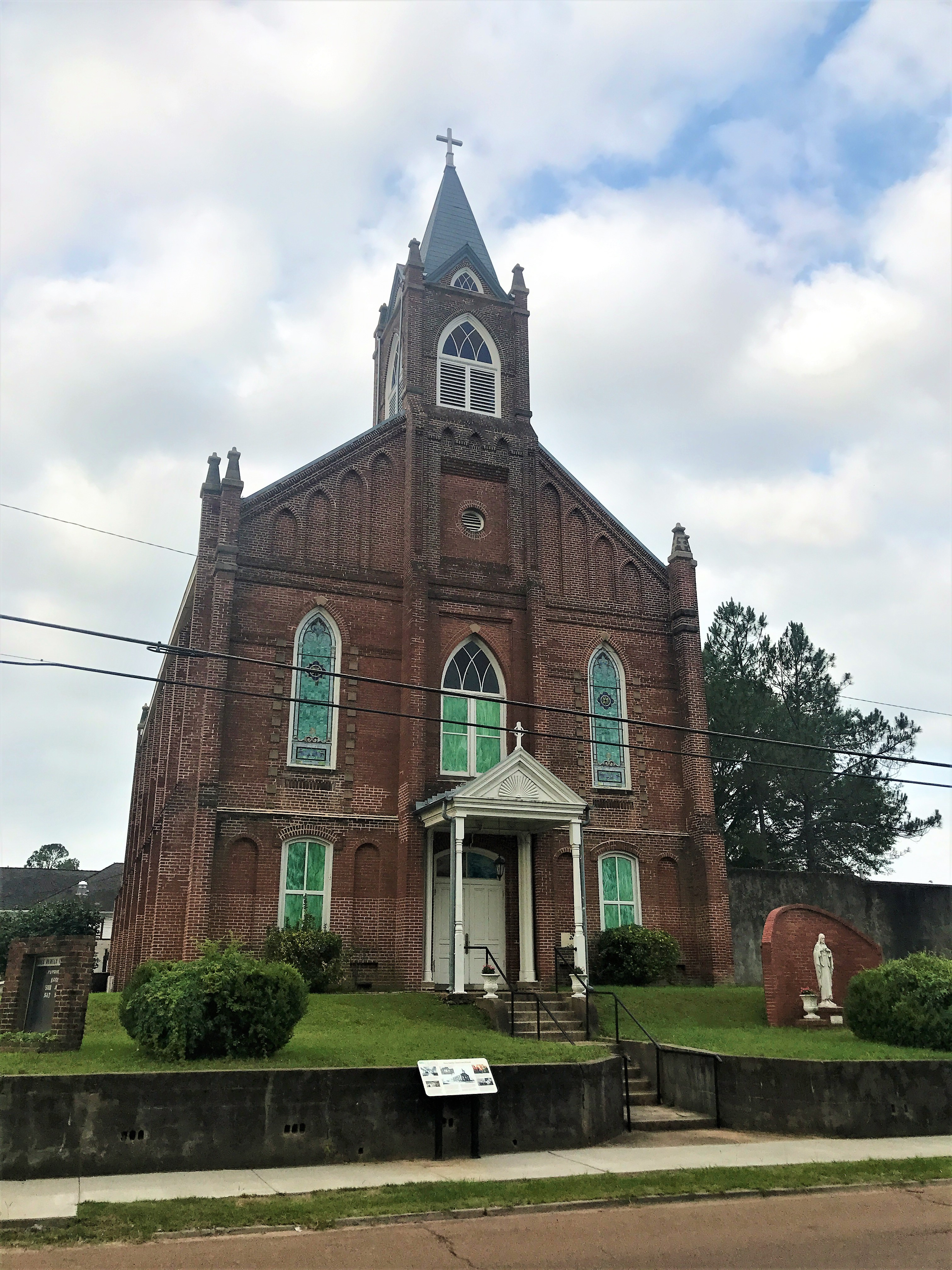
- Holy Family Church

- Location within Mississippi Location within the United States
- Location: Roughly along Aldrich, Old D'Evereux, St. Catherine, Abbott and Byrne Sts., Natchez, Mississippi
- Coordinates: 31°33′34″N 91°23′46″W
- Area: 9.2 acres (3.7 ha)
- Built: 1886
- Architect: Ketteringham, William K. (Holy Family Church)
- Architectural style: Greek Revival, Italianate, Queen Anne
- NRHP reference No.: 95000855
- Added to NRHP: July 14, 1995

The Holy Family Catholic Church Historic District, in Natchez, Mississippi, is a 9.2-acre (3.7 ha) historic district that was listed on the U.S. National Register of Historic Places (NRHP) in 1995.

Its most significant building is the Holy Family Church, the first African-American Catholic church in the state, dedicated in 1894 and staffed by the Josephites. It is Natchez's best piece of Gothic Revival architecture. The district as a whole is significant for its architecture and for its African-American historical associations.

The listing included 49 contributing buildings and one other contributing site. It includes Greek Revival, Italianate, and Queen Anne architecture.

The area is a historically black neighborhood. The district is a cluster of buildings near to the Holy Family Catholic Church, which is on St. Catherine St., which was originally the old Natchez Trace.

== See also ==
- Natchez On-Top-of-the-Hill Historic District, abutting the Holy Family HD on the west, and south of the Upriver HD
- Upriver Residential District, adjacent to the Woodlawn HD, on the west
- Woodlawn Historic District, another historically black neighborhood historic district (HD)
- Natchez Bluffs and Under-the-Hill Historic District, on river side of On-Top-of-the-Hill HD
- Downriver Residential Historic District, further south below the On-Top-of-the-Hill HD
- Clifton Heights Historic District, on the river side of the Upriver HD
- Cemetery Bluff District
