= Patterson House =

Patterson House, or Patterson Farmhouse or Patterson Farm may refer to:

- Walter Patterson House, Clinton, Arkansas, listed on the National Register of Historic Places (NRHP) in Arkansas
- George Washington Patterson Ranch-Ardenwood, Fremont, California, listed on the NRHP in California
- Croke-Patterson-Campbell Mansion, Denver, Colorado, listed on the NRHP in Colorado
- Patterson House (Fort Collins, Colorado), NRHP-listed in Larimer County
- Patterson-Turner Homeplace, Hartwell, Georgia, listed on the NRHP in Georgia
- Lapham-Patterson House, Thomasville, Georgia, listed on the NRHP in Georgia
- J. W. Patterson House, Fairmount, Indiana, listed on the NRHP in Indiana
- Patterson House (Larned, Kansas), listed on the NRHP in Kansas
- Neville-Patterson-Lamkin House, Arlington, Kentucky, listed on the NRHP in Kentucky
- Charles Patterson House (Frankfort, Kentucky), listed on the NRHP in Kentucky
- Thomas Patterson House, Hodgenville, Kentucky, listed on the NRHP in Kentucky
- Horace Patterson House, Lewisport, Kentucky, listed on the NRHP in Kentucky
- Joseph Patterson Quarters, Midway, Kentucky, listed on the NRHP in Kentucky
- Patterson House (Paintsville, Kentucky), listed on the NRHP in Kentucky
- Patterson, John, and Eliza Barr, House, Canton, Michigan, listed on the NRHP in Michigan
- Patterson-Hernandez House, Barnesville, Minnesota, listed on the NRHP in Minnesota
- Charles Patterson House (Natchez, Mississippi), listed on the NRHP in Mississippi
- Elisha and Lucy Patterson Farmstead Historic District, Florissant, Missouri, listed on the NRHP in Missouri
- Patterson Farmhouse (Delmar, New York), listed on the NRHP in New York
- John E. Patterson House, Fayetteville, North Carolina, listed on the NRHP in North Carolina
- Gilmore-Patterson Farm, St. Paul's, North Carolina, listed on the NRHP in North Carolina
- Samuel N. Patterson House, Xenia, Ohio, listed on the NRHP in Ohio
- A. W. Patterson House, Muskogee, Oklahoma, listed on the NRHP in Oklahoma
- Christian-Patterson Rental Property, Eugene, Oregon, listed on the NRHP in Oregon
- Patterson-Stratton House Eugene, Oregon, listed on the NRHP in Oregon
- Samuel Patterson House, New Alexandria, Pennsylvania, listed on the NRHP in Pennsylvania
- Burd Patterson House, Pottsville, Pennsylvania, listed on the NRHP in Pennsylvania
- Patterson Brothers Commercial Building and House, Valley Falls, Rhode Island, listed on the NRHP in Rhode Island
- Alexander Patterson House, Ten Mile, Tennessee, listed on the NRHP in Tennessee
- Stanley Patterson Hall, Dallas, Texas, listed on the NRHP in Texas
- Patterson Mansion in Washington, D.C., former home of the Washington Club

== See also ==
- Charles Patterson House (disambiguation)
