= King's Tavern =

- King Tavern
- U.S. National Register of Historic Places
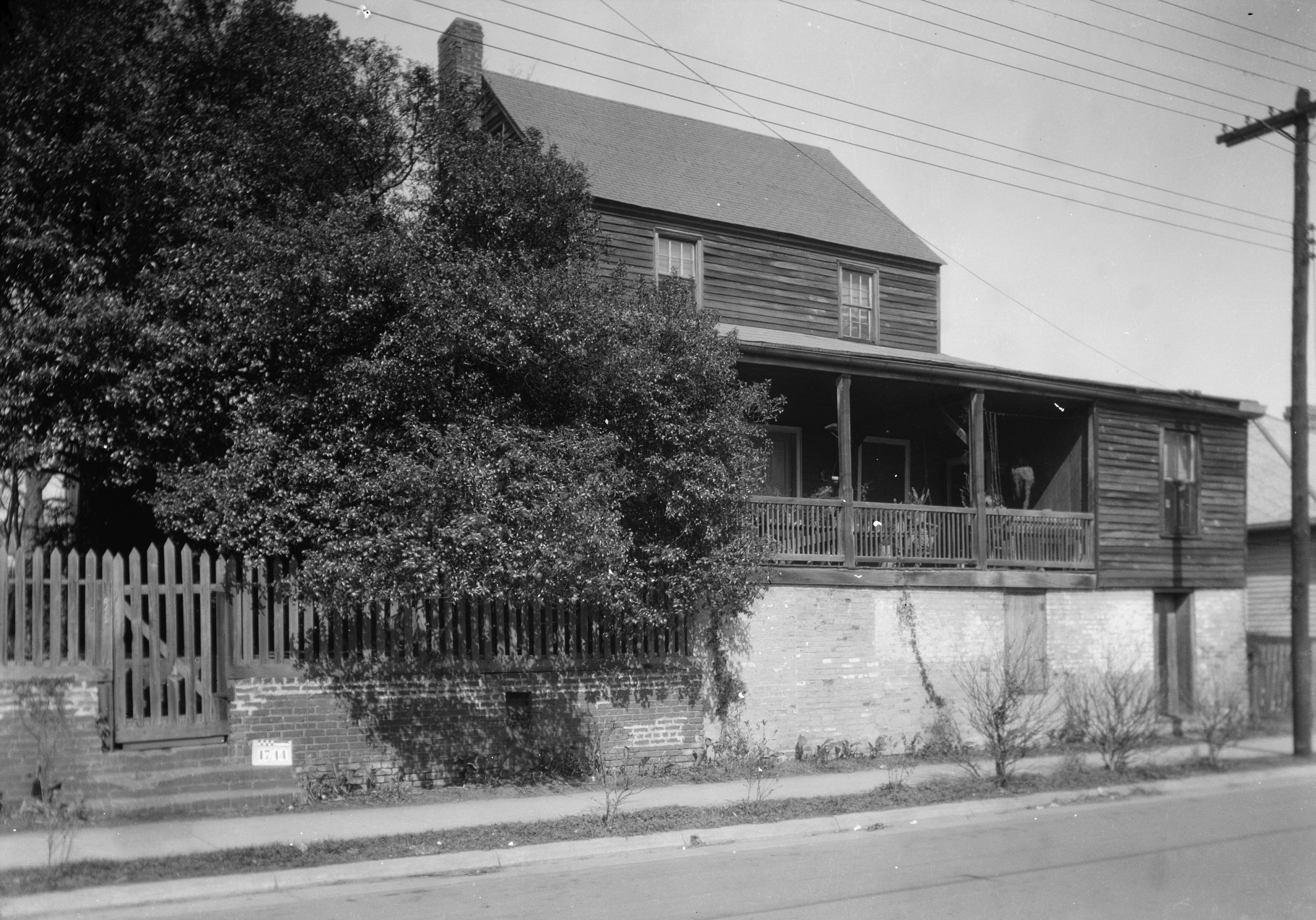
- King's Tavern

- Location within Mississippi Location within the United States
- Location: 611 Jefferson Street, Natchez, Mississippi
- Coordinates: 31.5602°N 91.3992°W
- Area: 0.3 acres (0.12 ha)
- Built: 1769
- NRHP reference No.: 71000444
- Added to NRHP: May 6, 1971

King's Tavern is a historic building and bar built in 1769 and located in the Natchez On-Top-of-the-Hill Historic District in Natchez, Mississippi. It is listed in the National Register of Historic Places since 1971; and is a contributing property within the Natchez On-Top-of-the-Hill Historic District. As of 2022, it is closed and for sale.

== History ==
=== Pre-Revolution ===
The King's Tavern building was built in 1769, making it the oldest structure in the old river port city of Natchez. When the British moved in and established the nearby Fort Panmure, the King's Tavern building was originally built to be a block house for the fort. As there was no saw mill near this frontier town, this building and other structures were constructed using beams taken from scrapped New Orleans sailing ships, which were brought to Natchez via mule. Another source of wood used in the King's Tavern building construction were barge boards from flat river boats, which were dismantled and sold after arriving in Natchez with their goods after traveling down the Ohio and Mississippi Rivers. Boatmen couldn't take their flat boats back up these rivers, so they just added to their profit by selling the boats as wood, which was needed to build Natchez. Besides the wood, sun-dried bricks also were used as building material. The result is a building which has an ambiance and decor of another era from the outside. Though the outside of the Kings Tavern has the rustic 1780s authentic wooden brick architectural style, the inside is a lovely place for cozy, quiet, intimate meal or to host luncheons, dinner parties, receptions meetings. The King's Tavern also provides meals for the large tour buses full of visitors who are traveling along the Natchez Trace Parkway.

=== Post-Revolution ===
After the Revolutionary War in 1776, the British left the area, leaving the river port open for other interests. In 1789, a New Yorker by the name of Richard King moved his family to Natchez where he bought this block home and opened a combination tavern and inn, as well as the place where the town's mail was dropped off. The hotel's location along the busy Natchez Trace route made it a popular spot for travelers. His inn business was very successful because of the need for boatmen and weary stage riders to have a secure place to rest for the night. The upstairs rooms on the third floor were comfortable accommodations. Selling drinks to townspeople and visitors as well was also a money maker. He also found himself to be very popular with people, because he received and sent the town's mail. Everyone congregated on the steps of his tavern, socializing and reading their mail. He enjoyed a celebrity status, and he and his wife became prominent and very much respected people in Natchez. During this time, outlaws began settling in Natchez. They preyed on the boatmen and visitors, made a living from gambling and robbing people, sometimes not thinking twice of killing their victims. After selling their goods and their flat boats for lumber, boatmen would spend the night at the King's Tavern, and then head home along the Natchez Trace pathway. This usually caused highwaymen outlaws to hold them up, and usually kill them. The infamous, sadistic Harpe brothers were outlaws who took delight in torturing, mutilating and finally killing their victims. The Harpe brothers as well as other such men would return to Natchez and stimulate the economy, sometimes staying at the King's Tavern, if not in the nearby Natchez Under-the-hill area, notorious for being a haven for people of questionable character. However, with the invention of the steamboat, which could travel down and up the river as well, the need for this dangerous travel along Natchez Trace ended with this form of modern transportation. This development cut down on the lucrative stage business significantly, dropping the economic activity taking place at the King's Tavern. Richard King sold the King's Tavern in 1817. The building was once again a private home, becoming the Postalwaith family home for several generations, a total of 150 years, beginning in 1823.

== Modern-day ==
In 1973, the building was sold to a local investor and it eventually became a tavern and restaurant to serve both locals and visitors, taking the original name, the King's Tavern. Under new ownership as "The Tavern" it reopened in the fall of 2013. The owners used the farm-to-table concept using locally sourced quality ingredients.

== Haunting and paranormal activity ==
One of the oldest buildings in Natchez built in the 1700s. The city's oldest standing building, King's Tavern is rich in history, and that includes the paranormal kind. It is considered the most haunted restaurant in Mississippi. The building is believed to be haunted by several ghosts, including Madeline, the mistress of one of the tavern's original owners. Although many believe Madeline was murdered by the wife of her lover, no one is sure what happened to her. In the 1930s, when the skeletal remains of three bodies, two men and one woman (which was assumed to be Madeline), were found hidden in the wall behind the fireplace. A jeweled dagger was also found with the remains which was assumed to be the murder weapon. Aside from supernatural happenings believed to be caused by Madeline, employees have reported hearing a baby crying (supposedly murdered by one of the Harpe brothers), seeing mysterious reflections appear in mirrors, and an unoccupied bed giving off a warmth as if someone was sleeping in it.
