= Charles Patterson House =

Charles Patterson House may refer to:

- Charles Patterson House (Frankfort, Kentucky), listed on the NRHP in Kentucky
- Charles Patterson House (Natchez, Mississippi), listed on the NRHP in Mississippi

== See also ==
- Patterson House (disambiguation)
