= Magnolia Hall (Natchez, Mississippi) =

Historic house in Mississippi, United States

- Henderson-Britton House
- U.S. National Register of Historic Places
- U.S. Historic district – Contributing property
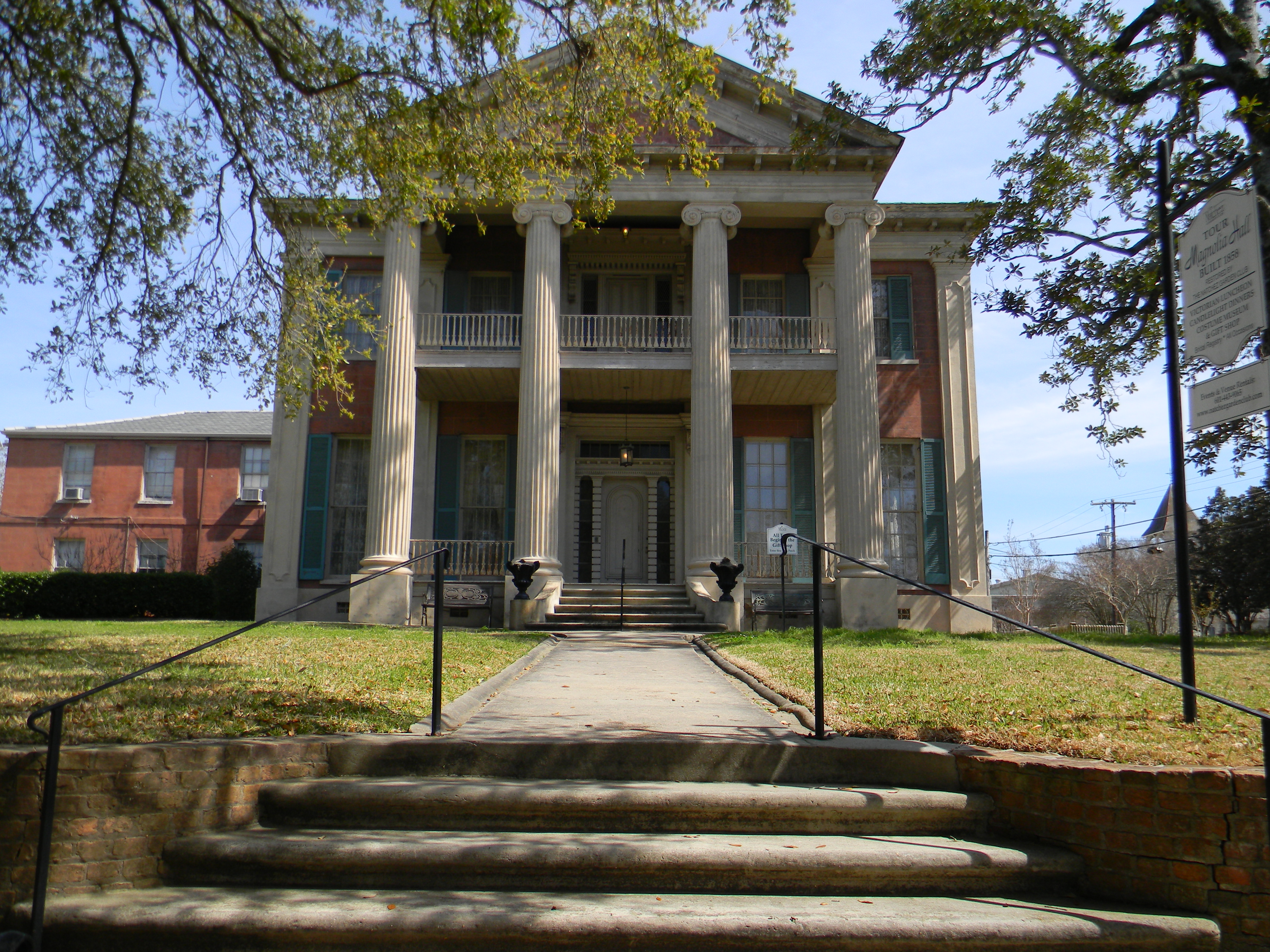
- Front of Magnolia Hall, as viewed from Pearl St.

- Location within Mississippi Location within the United States
- Location: 215 S. Pearl St., Natchez, Mississippi
- Coordinates: 31°33′30″N 91°24′15″W
- Area: less than one acre
- Built: 1858
- Architectural style: Greek Revival
- Part of: Natchez On-Top-of-the-Hill Historic District (ID79003381)
- NRHP reference No.: 78001580
- Added to NRHP: June 9, 1978

Magnolia Hall, also known as the Henderson-Britton House, is a Greek Revival mansion in Natchez, Mississippi, built in 1858. It is a contributing property to the Natchez On Top of the Hill Historic District, and was listed on the National Register of Historic Places in 1978.

Magnolia Hall was built by Thomas Henderson, a wealthy merchant, planter, and cotton broker. The home is one of the finest examples in Natchez of the Greek Revival style. In 1868, the home was sold to Natchez banker and planter Audley Clark Britton and his wife Eliza Macrery Britton. The Britton family owned the home until 1935.

During a bombardment of Natchez by the Union gunboat Essex, a shell hit the soup tureen in Magnolia Hall's kitchen.

The Natchez Garden Club has restored Magnolia Hall. Rooms on the main floor are filled with mid-nineteenth century antiques, while rooms on the upper floors contain a costume collection.

Magnolia Hall is open for tours, and there is a gift shop.

== Gallery ==
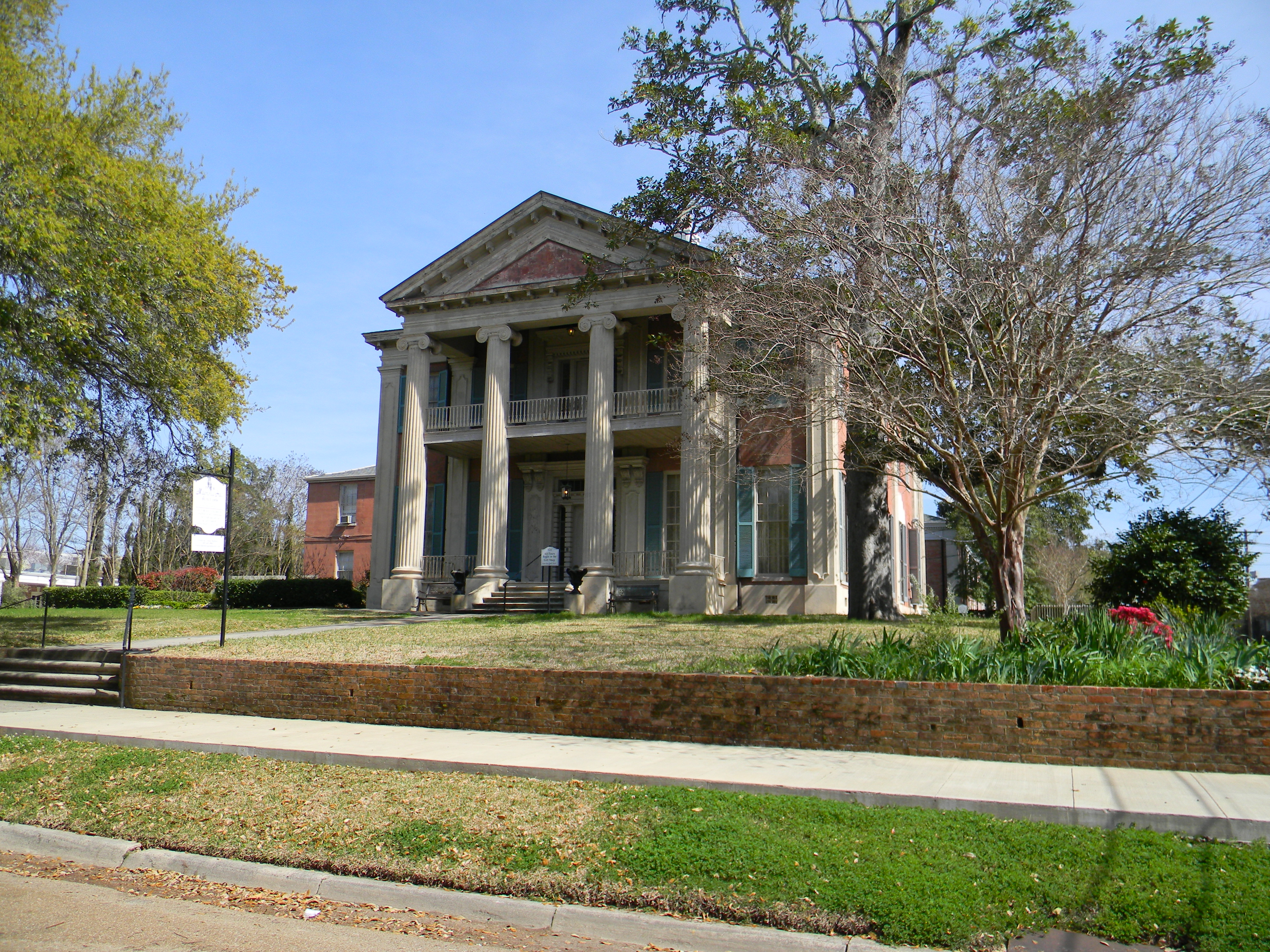
View of the property from the corner of Pearl and Washington Streets

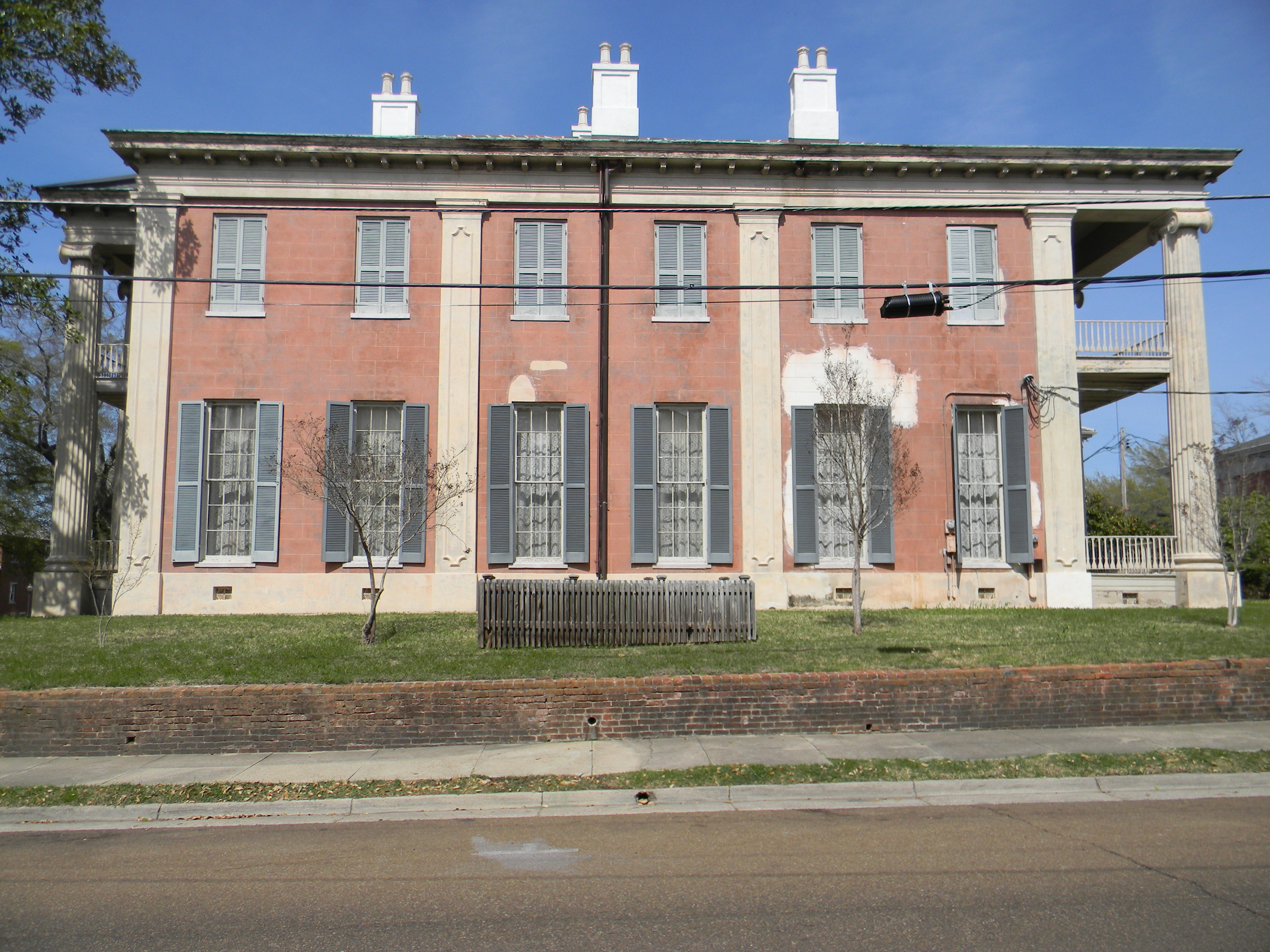
View of the side of the property from Washington Street

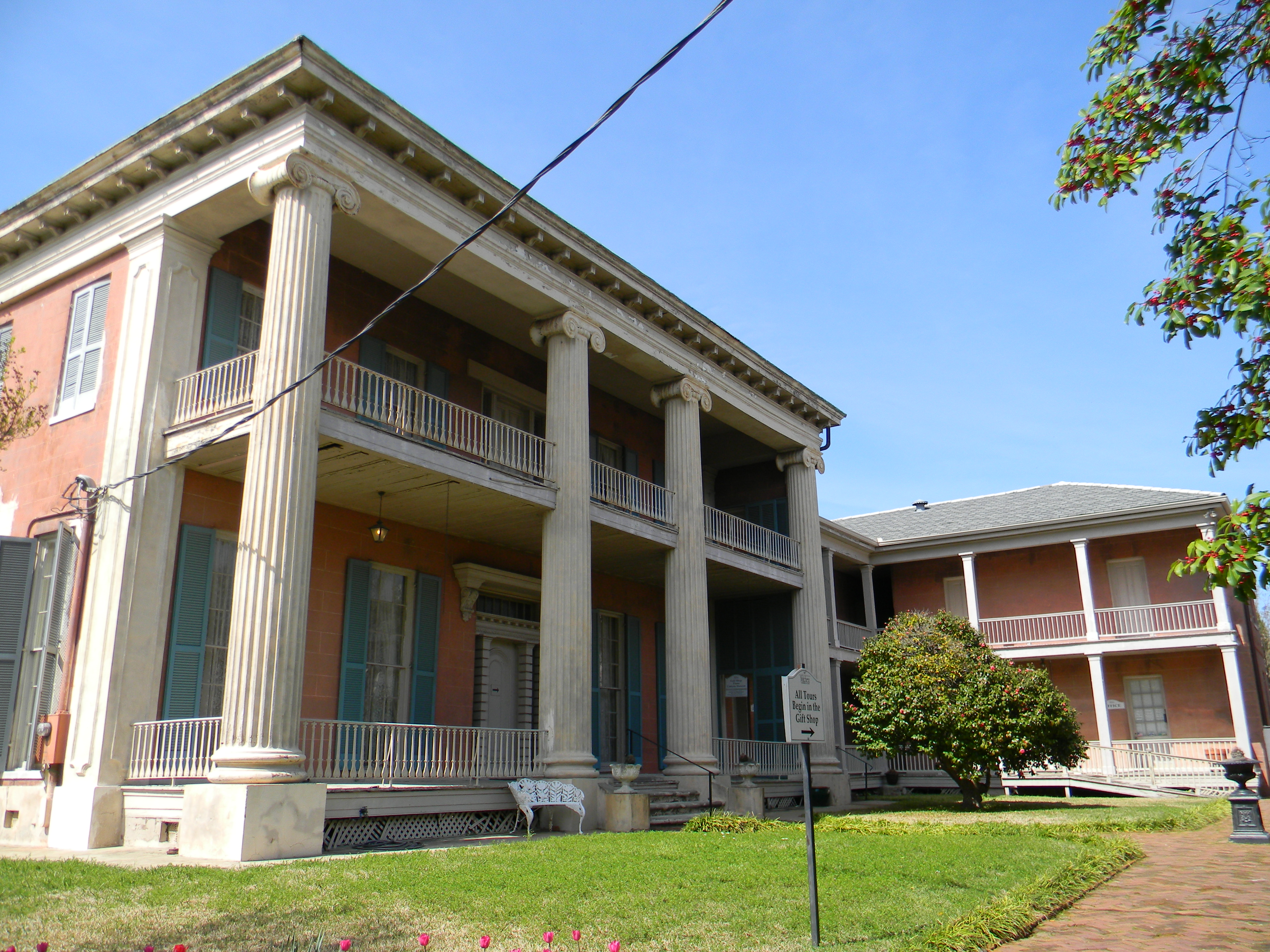
View of the rear of the property from Washington Street
