= Melchior S. Beltzhoover =

American businessman (1868–1918)

Melchior Stewart Beltzhoover (1868-1918) was an American businessman in the oil and cotton industry. He was a resident of Natchez, Mississippi, and Irvington, New York.

== Biography ==
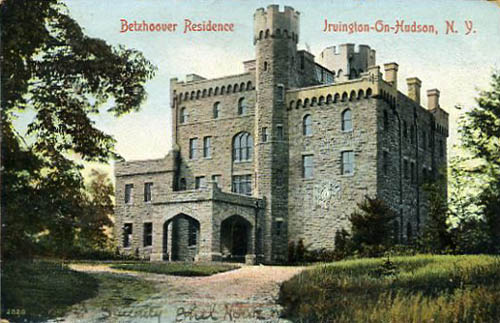
A postcard of "Rochroane", Beltzhoover's residence in Irvington, New York.

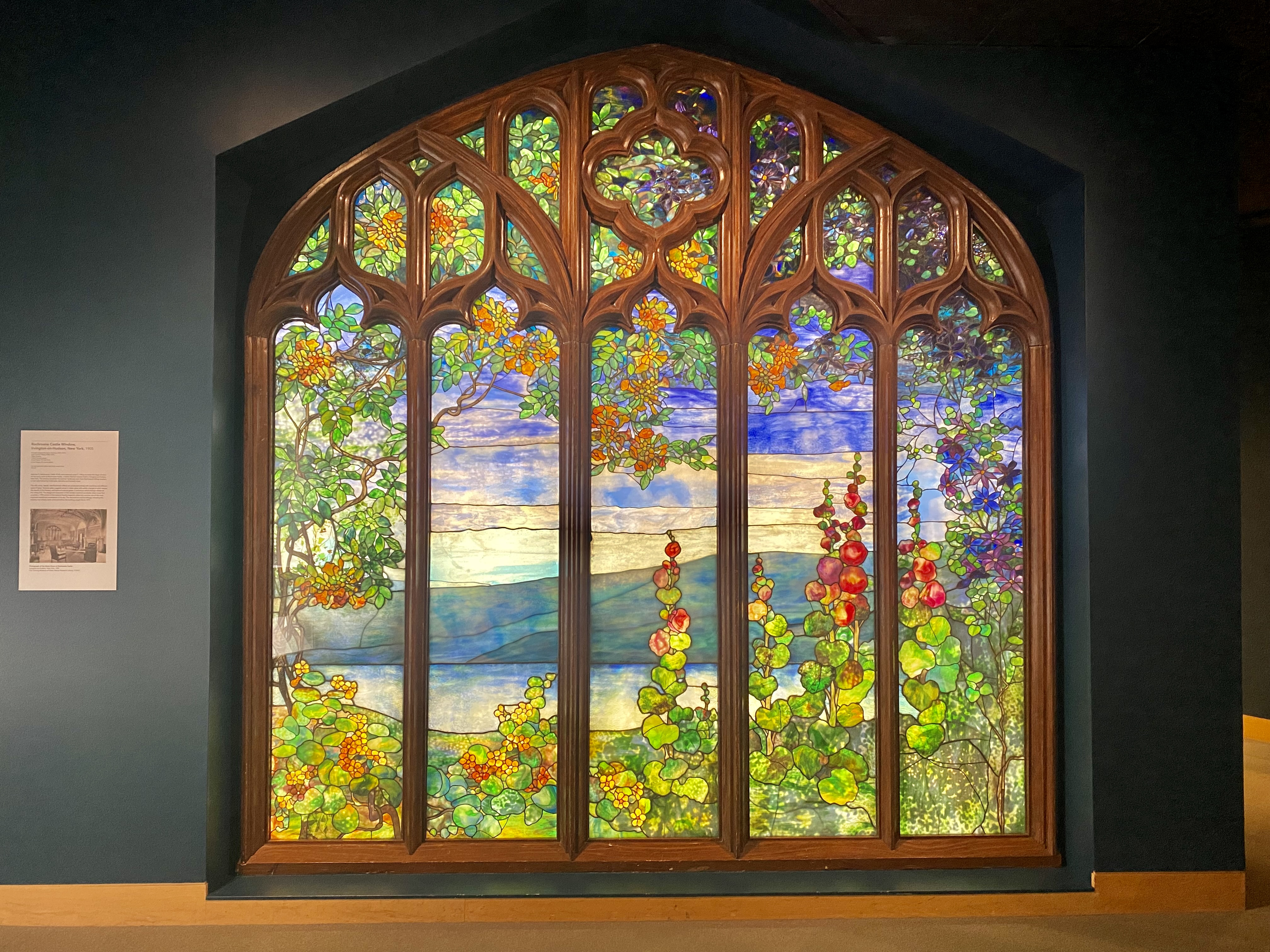
The Tiffany Window from Rochroane on display at the Corning Museum of Glass.

Melchior Stewart Beltzhoover was the adoptive son of Melchior Wallace Beltzhoover, a descendant of the family that the Beltzhoover neighborhood in Pittsburgh is named for. His father was a pioneer of the street railway business in Pittsburgh. He was born on May 22, 1868, in Monmouth, Illinois. His mother was listed in records as Malona Stewart Gulick, who was married to John Walker Gulick, and his birth name has also been reported as Melchior Stewart Gulick Beltzhoover. He spent most of his youth in Europe, where he was educated abroad and became familiar with most major European cities and art. Beltzhoover moved to Natchez, Mississippi, around 1890. In 1891, he married Virginia Lee Koontz, his adoptive first cousin. Koontz's father was a prominent banker in Natchez, and the couple inherited Green Leaves, the family mansion in Natchez. They had two children, Melchior Roch Beltzhoover and Virginia Roane Beltzhoover Robinson.

An oil and cotton magnate, Beltzhoover owned many plantations in the area around Natchez and other parts of Mississippi and Louisiana. He also worked to expand cultivation of food crops in the Deep South that had historically been grown in the north. He also served as vice president of the Britton and Koontz Bank, the bank founded by his father-in-law, and was the principal owner of the Natchez Department Store. He also had an investment in Herbert & Huesgen Co., one of the largest photography firms in New York City. During a major bank run in Natchez, Beltzhoover came to the rescue of financial institutions in Natchez following the failure of First Natchez Bank. He was also involved in stock farming, having imported Jersey cattle that reportedly became known as prize winners throughout the country. His stock farm near Natchez, called "Anchorage", was one of the major show places in Mississippi. Beltzhoover first came to Irvington in 1900. In 1902, he established the Irvington National Bank, and served as its president for its first four years before retiring from that position to focus on civic affairs in the village.

In 1902, he commissioned New York City architect Arthur J. Manning to design a 44-room Gothic revival castle in Irvington near the Hudson River. Modeled on a Rhineland castle and constructed with rock quarried from the site, the structure contained a music room with a pipe organ and a stained-glass window designed by Louis Comfort Tiffany, which depicts a view of the Hudson River from the castle. This window is reportedly one of the most well-known works of Tiffany glass. Construction was completed in 1905. Rochroane was a popular site for shooting early motion pictures. Beltzhoover served as the "President" of the Irvington village from 1904 to 1916, helping build out much of the area's modern infrastructure. He was considered a summer resident of the village, living in Natchez most of the time.

Beltzhoover died unexpectedly on July 20, 1918, in Natchez after a short bout of pneumonia, and was buried in the Natchez City Cemetery. He was so well respected that the local press reported that the entire city of Natchez mourned his death and many Natchez businesses closed the day of his funeral. Shortly after his death, his fortune was estimated to be worth over $2 million (~$27 million in 2024), with his total net worth estimated at $7 to $8 million (~$96.6 million to ~$110 million in 2024). His descendants lost most of their fortune in the 1920s and 1930s.

== Legacy ==
Beltzhoover's estate was sold by his widow to James D. Shields, the president of the Standish Worsted Company, in 1920. In 1927, the property was sold to Benjamin and Katherine Halsey, who renamed the castle Grey Towers. The property later became the possession of Immaculate Conception Church. Scenes from the 1973 Burt Reynolds film Shamus were filmed in and around the castle. The castle burned in 1977, and the respective portion of the property was sold to developers. The Tiffany Window was removed from the structure before its demolition, and was donated to the Corning Museum of Glass in April 1977, where it is still on display. The lake on the property and a smaller structure known as the Beltzhoover Teahouse are now part of a public park. Green Leaves in Natchez was listed on the National Register of Historic Places in 1979, and is still owned by Beltzhoover's descendants.
