= First Presbyterian Church of Natchez =

Historic church in Mississippi, United States

- U.S. National Register of Historic Places
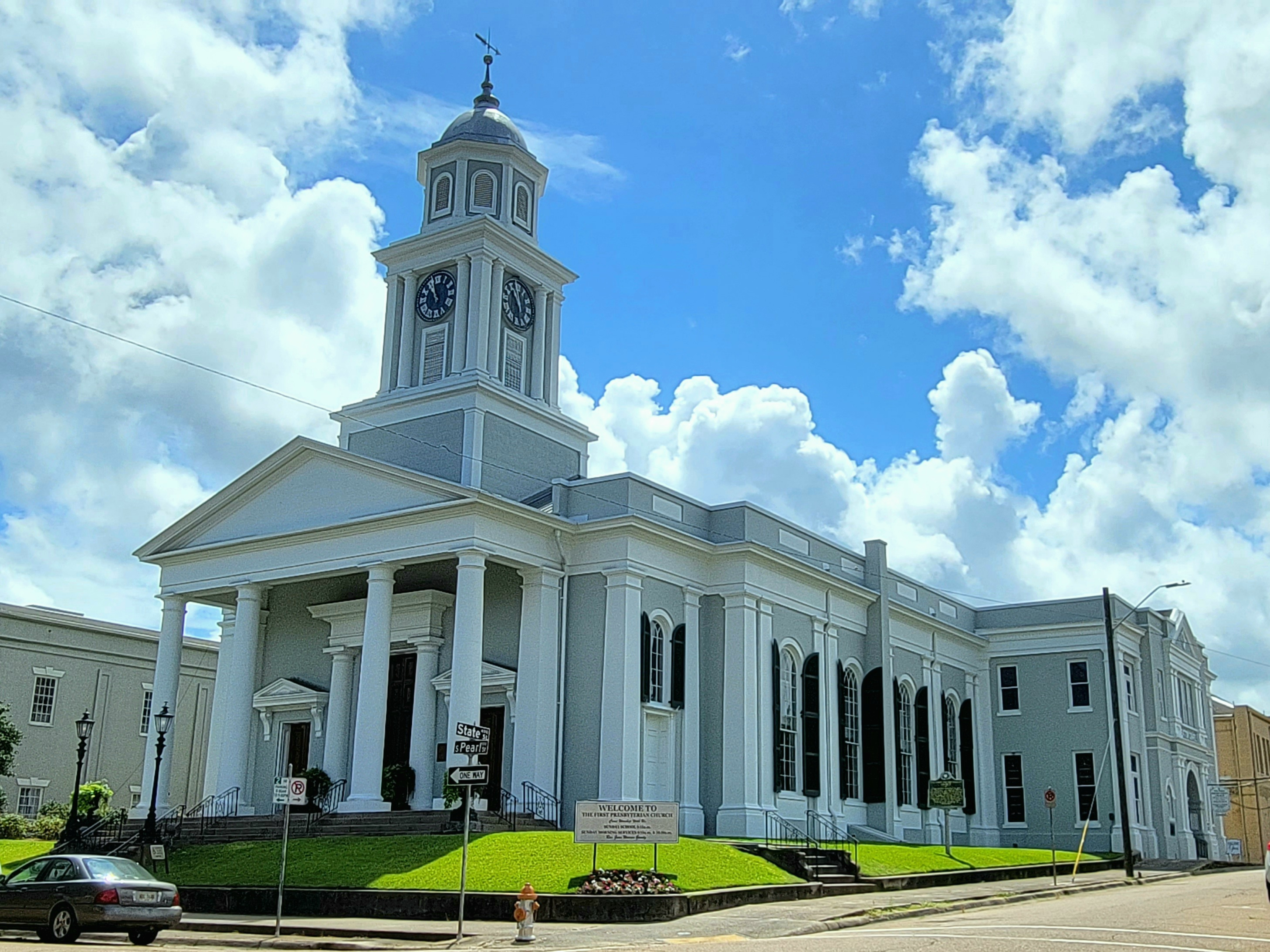

- Location within Mississippi Location within the United States
- Location: 117 S. Pearl St., Natchez, Mississippi
- Coordinates: 31°33′32″N 91°24′13″W
- Area: less than one acre
- Built: 1830
- Architectural style: Greek Revival, Federal
- NRHP reference No.: 78001578
- Added to NRHP: December 22, 1978

First Presbyterian Church of Natchez is a historic church at 117 S. Pearl Street in Natchez, Mississippi. It was built in 1830 with Greek Revival and Federal style architectural features. The building was added to the National Register of Historic Places in 1978. It also became a contributing property to the Natchez On-Top-of-the-Hill Historic District in 1979. For many years The Manse (Natchez, Mississippi) housed its pastors.
