= Ravennaside =

Historic house in Mississippi, United States

- U.S. National Register of Historic Places
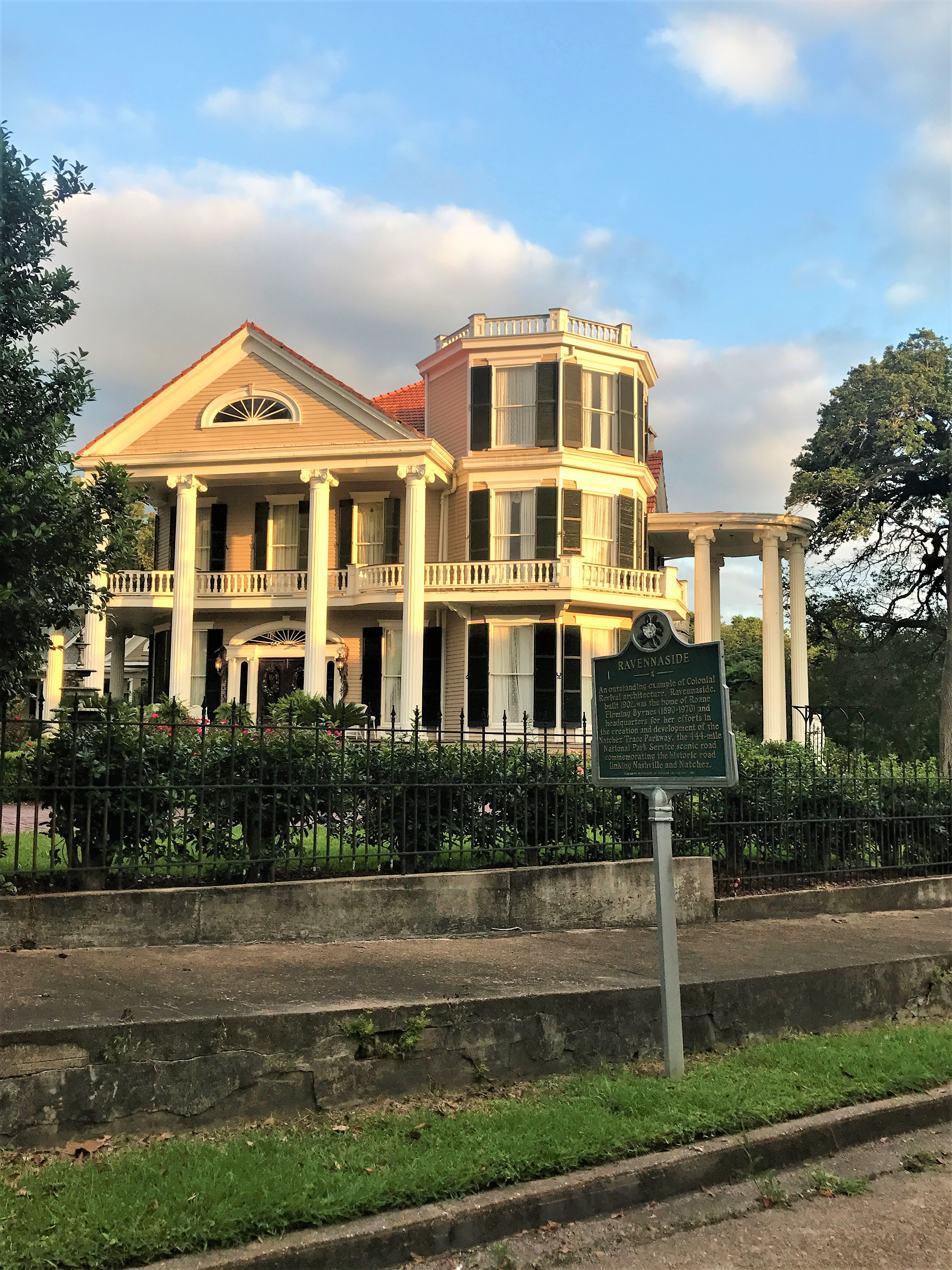
- Ravennaside in 2017

- Location within Mississippi
- Location: 601 S. Union St., Natchez, Mississippi
- Coordinates: 31°32′47″N 91°24′33″W
- Area: 4 acres (1.6 ha)
- Built: 1902
- Architectural style: Greek Revival ??? Classical Revival
- Part of: Downriver Residential Historic District (ID99000385)
- NRHP reference No.: 79001299
- Added to NRHP: July 5, 1979

Ravennaside, at 601 S. Union St. in Natchez, Mississippi, was built in 1902. It is Classical Revival in style. It was listed on the National Register of Historic Places in 1979.

The property includes a barn, a blacksmith shop, and a cottage to the rear which are older and are associated with the history of Ravenna, on an adjacent property.

It was home of Roane Fleming Byrnes (1890-1970), who was active in historic preservation and race relations and is also known for her promotion of the Natchez Trace Parkway.

Ravennaside has been listed as having been built in c.1900.

Ravennaside's address has been given as 601 South Union Street. It is one of three houses which were originally part of a family compound, along with Ravenna Cottage at 4 Ravenna Lane and Ravenna, which has been listed at 8 Ravenna Lane and also at 601 South Union Street. All three are included in the 1999-listed Downriver Residential Historic District.
