= Roane Fleming Byrnes =

Historic preservationist (1890-1970)

Roane Fleming Byrnes (1890–1970) was a historic preservationist who spearheaded the creation of the Natchez Trace Parkway.

She lived at Ravennaside, a historic mansion in Natchez, Mississippi. She was active in both historic preservation and race relations.
