= The Manse (Natchez, Mississippi) =

Historic house in Mississippi, United States

- Manse, The
- U.S. National Register of Historic Places
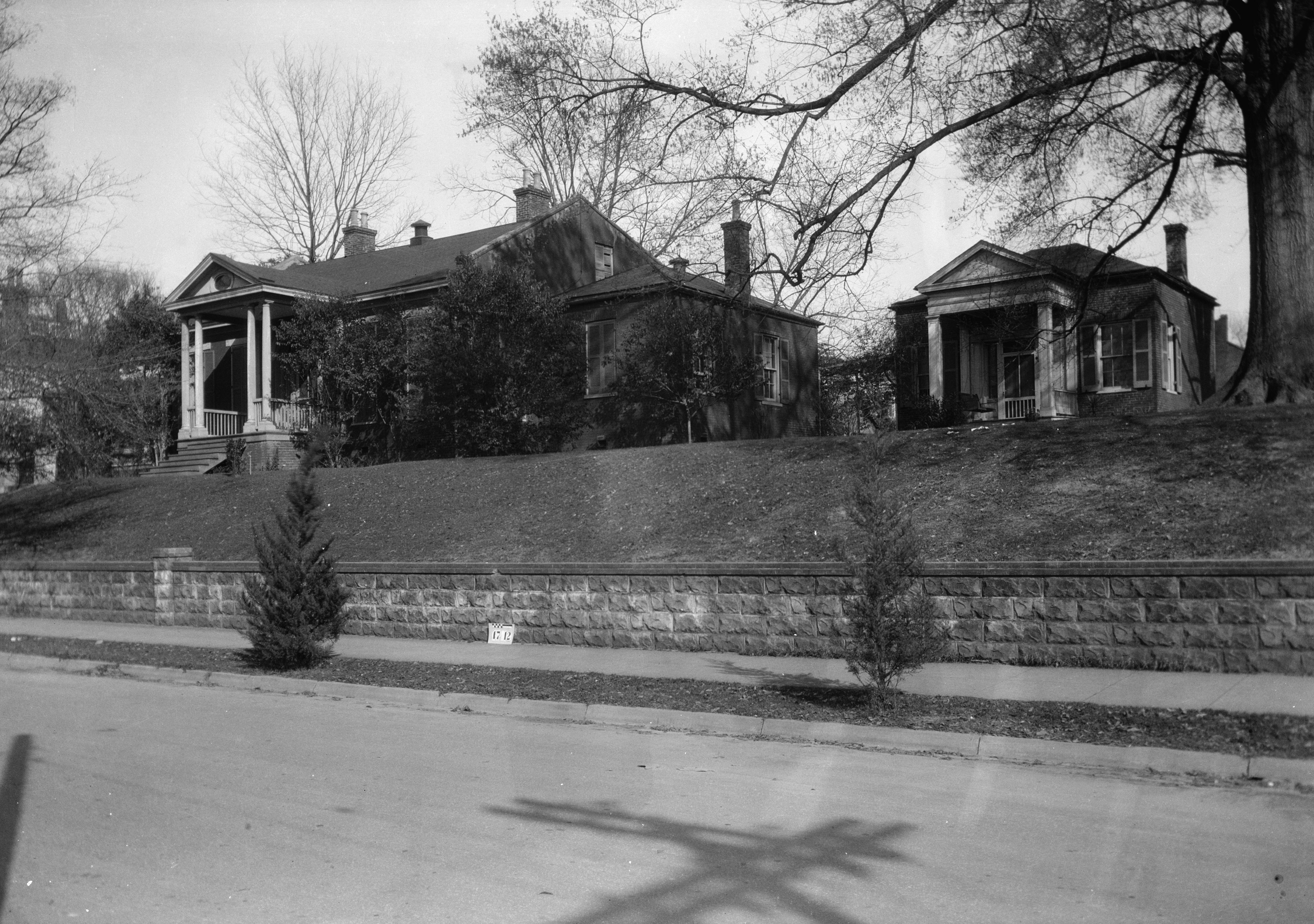

- Location within Mississippi Location within the United States
- Location: 307 S. Rankin St., Natchez, Mississippi
- Coordinates: 31°33′20″N 91°24′9″W
- Area: less than one acre
- Built: 1838
- Architectural style: Greek Revival
- NRHP reference No.: 79001291
- Added to NRHP: March 7, 1979

The Manse, also known as Presbyterian Manse, is a historic house within the Natchez On-Top-of-the-Hill Historic District in Natchez, Mississippi. It has been listed on the National Register of Historic Places since March 7, 1979; and is listed as a pivotal property in the Natchez On-Top-of-the-Hill Historic District.

== Location ==
The site is located at 307 South Rankin Street in Natchez, Mississippi, USA. It is next door to the antebellum house named Green Leaves.

== History ==
Margaret Overaker is first known to have owned the property. It was purchased in 1832 for $3,500 by Thomas Macdannold—a rich man about whom not much is known. Macdannold must have had the house built, because the property was purchased just four years later in 1836 for a much higher price ($14,320.88) by Thomas Henderson—a First Presbyterian Church of Natchez elder. The property was purchased in 1838 by the First Presbyterian Church of Natchez to serve as its manse. The previous Presbyterian manse was the Natchez home known as the Elms. The following is a list of some of the Presbyterian pastors who lived in the manse.

- 1843–1894: Reverend Doctor Joseph Buck Stratton. The two side wings and the pastor's study building in the side yard were built during this time at the manse.
- 1950–1954: Reverend Doctor James Walton Stewart. Church membership increased from 657 to 754 during Rev. Dr. Stewart's tenure in the manse.

== Architecture ==
As built in the 1830s for Thomas Macdannold, the home was designed in the Federal architectural style. The home has the fine detailing found in the largest two-story Natchez area mansions, and its front door is among the best in the area.

When entering from the front door, one stepped into a 9-foot-wide by an 18.5-foot-long hallway with a 17 by 18.5 foot room on each side. Each of these side rooms had a fireplace. At the rear of the front hallway, folding double doors led into a 15 foot wide by 23 foot long back portion of the hallway. This space had an approximately same sized room (14 by 23) on each side of it. Each of these three back rooms had a window, fireplace and a door to the back. A porch ran along the back side of the house. A service wing connected to one end of the rear porch and contained a row of rooms stretching away from the home toward the back of the property. These rooms consisted of a storage room, kitchen, laundry room and enslaved African servants quarters.

In 1847 two smaller wings were added to opposite ends of the house. At this point the home had seven rooms with fireplaces in the main portion and a servant's wing off the back of the house. In 1849 a small separate building was added to the property that was used as Reverend Doctor Joseph Buck Stratton's study. The study was designed in the Greek Revival architectural style.

In 1895 the dining room, which was then located at the rear corner of the main block of the house nearest to the service wing, was divided into three service rooms. These service rooms were a bathroom, a pantry and a hall/trunk room. The rear portion of the center hall became the new dining room. In 1947–48 the rear porch was enclosed. Despite the need to fit in interior bathrooms and a kitchen over the years, the original design has remained largely intact.

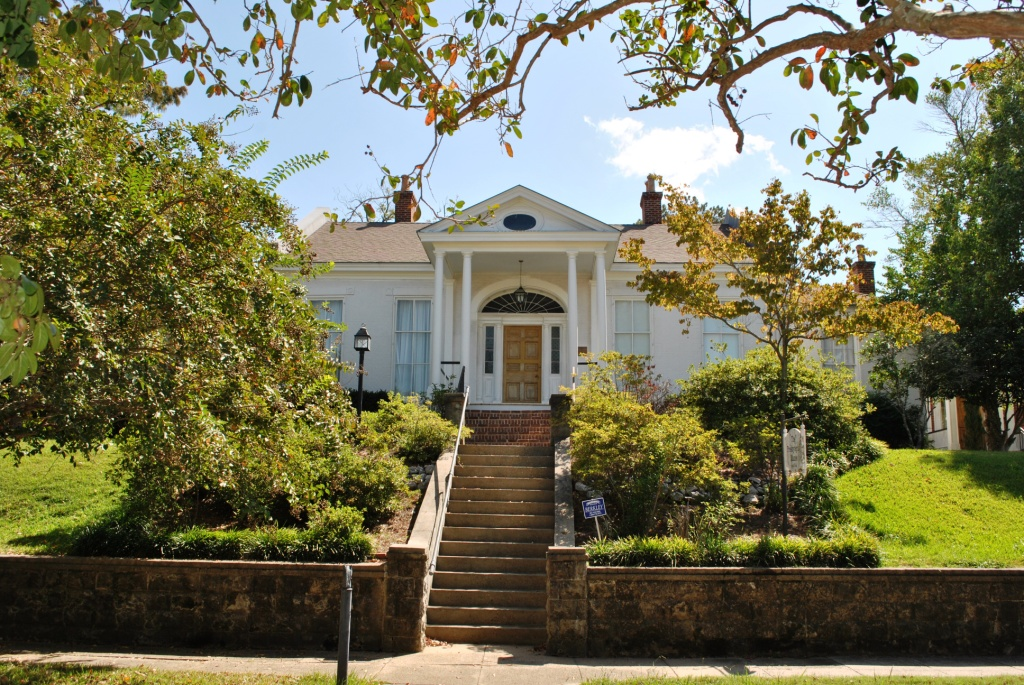
The Manse

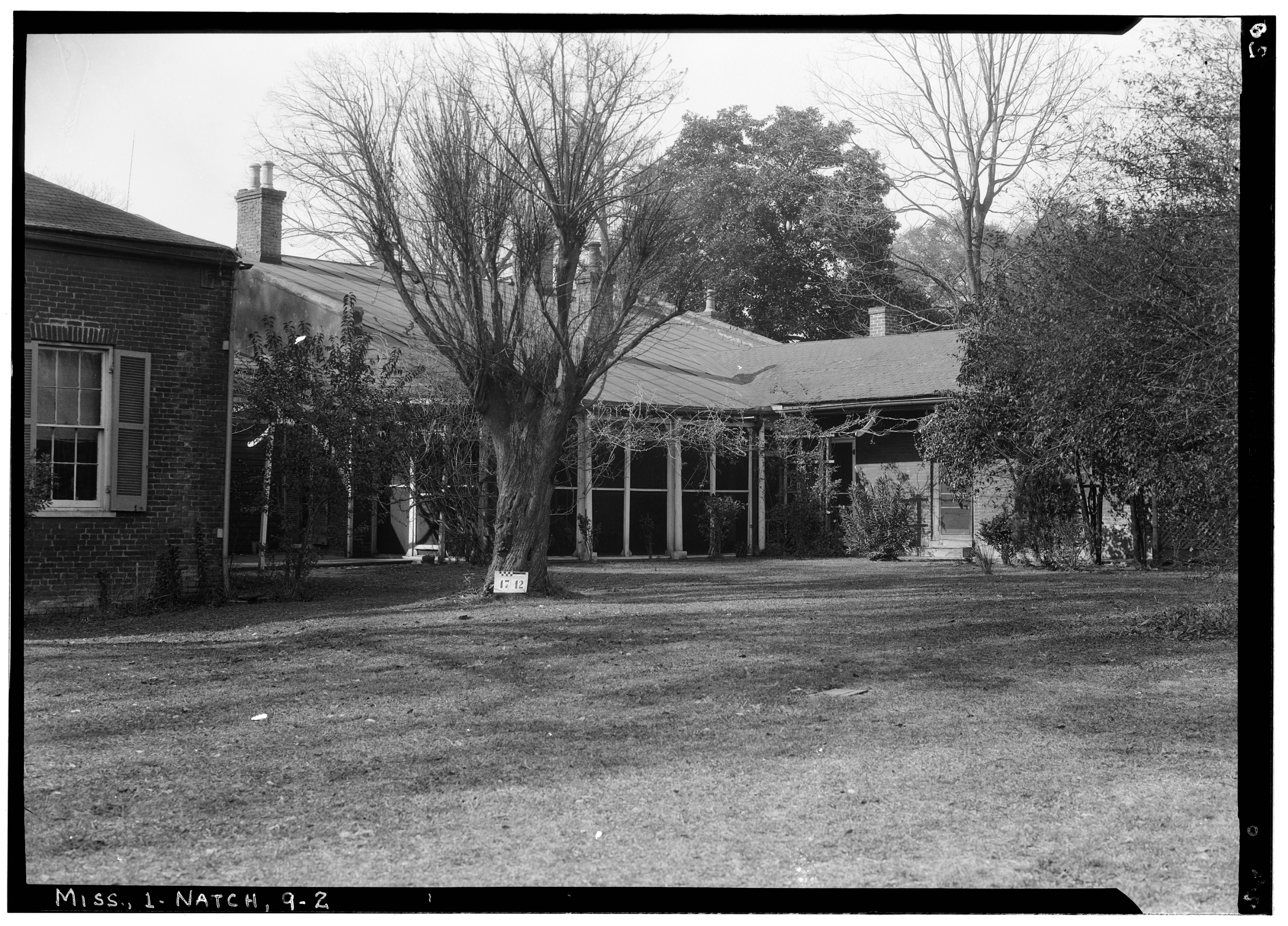
Rear view of the Manse in Natchez at 307 South Rankin Street, Natchez, MS
