= John Baynton House =

Historic house in Mississippi, United States

- U.S. National Register of Historic Places
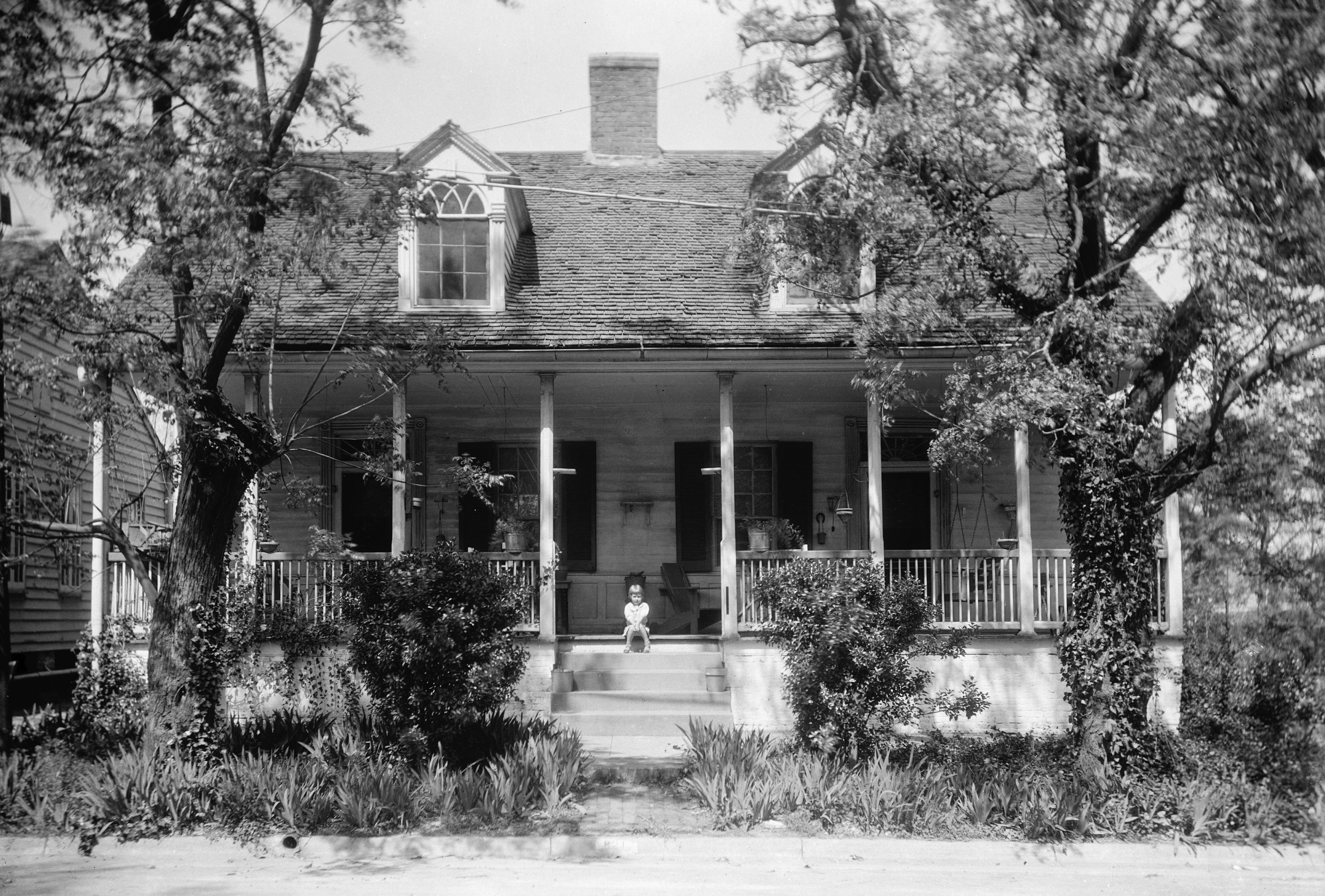

- Location within Mississippi Location within the United States
- Location: 821 Main St., Natchez, Mississippi
- Coordinates: 31°33′24″N 91°23′53″W
- Area: less than one acre
- Built: 1835
- Architectural style: Federal
- NRHP reference No.: 74001048
- Added to NRHP: October 16, 1974

The John Baynton House (also known as "Williamsburg" or "Banachi") is a historic house within the Natchez On-Top-of-the-Hill Historic District in Natchez, Adams County, Mississippi. It is located at number 821 on Main Street in Natchez, Mississippi.

It has been listed on the National Register of Historic Places since October 16, 1974 for the architecture; and is a contributing property to the Natchez On-Top-of-the-Hill Historic District.

== History ==
The John Baynton House is an excellent example of the Federal style cottage in Natchez, and contains fine architectural details with regional characteristics. It has one story and a half.

The house was built for John Baynton, a land speculator, in 1833. It was purchased by the Junkin family; one of their descendants is John R. Junkin, who served as the speaker of the Mississippi House of Representatives in the 1970s.

== See also ==
- National Register of Historic Places listings in Adams County, Mississippi
