= Trinity Episcopal Church (Natchez, Mississippi) =

Antebellum church building in Natchez, Mississippi, US

- U.S. Historic district – Contributing property
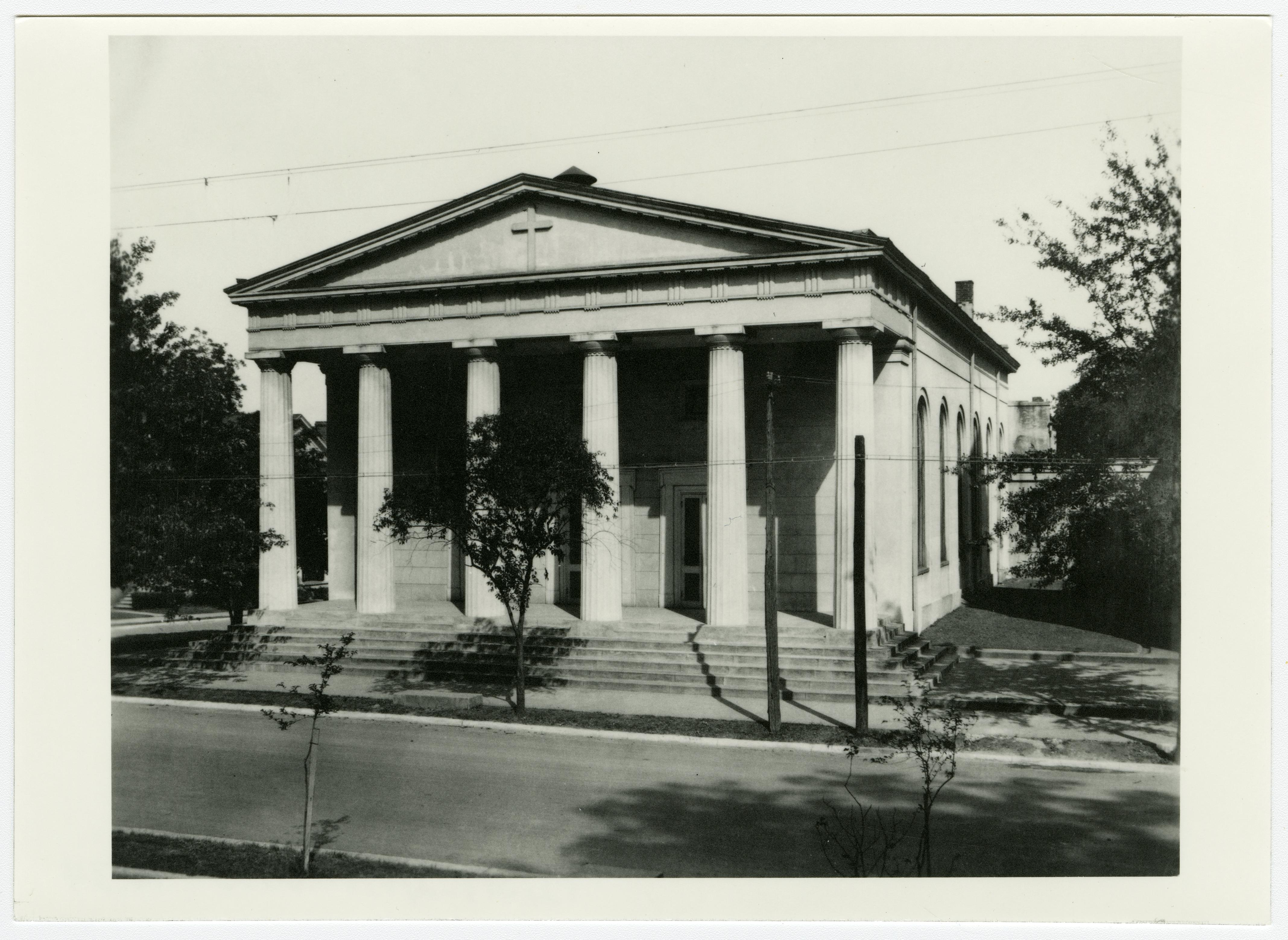
- Trinity Episcopal Church, Natchez
- Location: 305 Commerce Street South, Natchez, Mississippi
- Built: 1822
- Architectural style: Greek Revival
- Website: trinitynatchez.org
- Part of: Natchez On-Top-of-the-Hill Historic District (ID79003381)
- Added to NRHP: September 17, 1979

Trinity Episcopal Church is a historic church in Natchez, Mississippi. Located on the southeast corner of Commerce and Washington, it was "erected in 1822. It is a rectangular brick building with a gallery extending across the front. Tall Corinthian columns are a part of the wide portico, and two heavy shuttered doors open into the beautiful interior." The initial organization of the church reportedly happened over a dinner at Stephen Duncan's mansion. A basement room was opened in 1839 for use as a Sunday School and for "assembling of slaves for religious instruction." Bishop Leonidas Polk consecrated the building in 1840. As of 1911 its amenities included a "magnificent pipe organ." The church is a contributing property to the Natchez On-Top-of-the-Hill Historic District on the National Register of Historic Places.
