= Ravenna (Natchez, Mississippi) =

Historic house in Mississippi, United States

- U.S. National Register of Historic Places
- U.S. Historic district – Contributing property
- Location within Mississippi Location within the United States
- Location: 601 South Union Street, Natchez, Mississippi
- Coordinates: 31°33′12″N 91°24′19″W
- Area: 3.9 acres (1.6 ha)
- Built: 1835-36
- Architectural style: Greek Revival
- Part of: Downriver Residential Historic District (ID99000385)
- NRHP reference No.: 82004975
- Added to NRHP: November 4, 1982

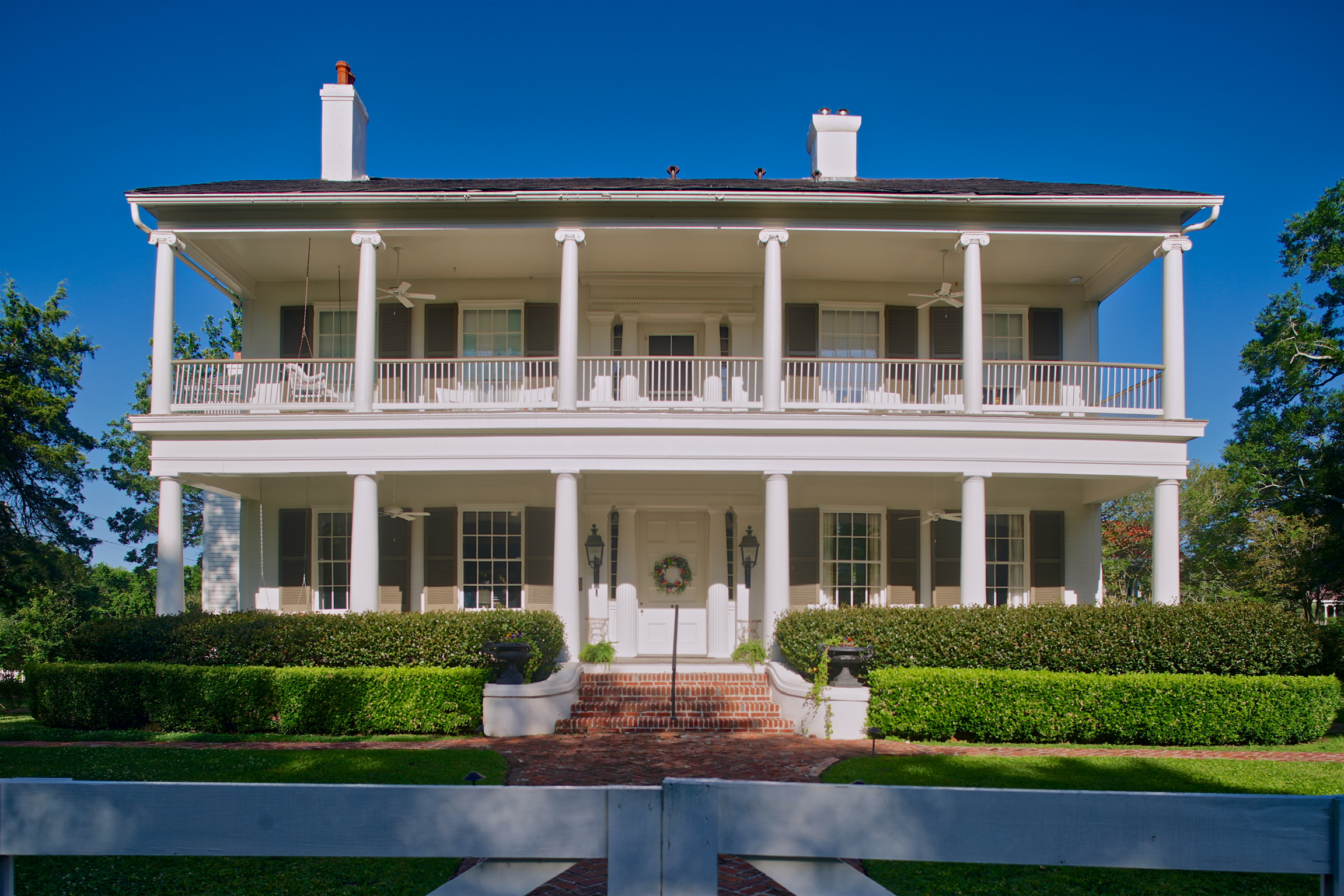
Ravenna

Ravenna is a historic two-and-a-half-story mansion in Natchez, Mississippi, U.S.. It was built in 1835-1836 for William Harris, a merchant commissioner, planter and Natchez alderman. It was designed in the Greek Revival architectural style, based on plans by Asher Benjamin. By the 1850s, it was purchased by the Metcalfe family, whose descendants owned the house until they sold it to Dr. Mallan Morgan in the 1980s.Current owners are Carl and Mary Beth Beasley. It has been listed on the National Register of Historic Places since November 4, 1982.

Ravenna's address has been given as 8 Ravenna Lane and as 601 South Union Street. It is one of three houses which were originally part of a family compound, along with Ravenna Cottage at 4 Ravenna Lane and Ravennaside (c.1900) also at 601 South Union Street. All three are included in the 1999-listed Downriver Residential Historic District.
