= Green Leaves =

Historic house in Mississippi, United States

- Koontz House
- U.S. National Register of Historic Places
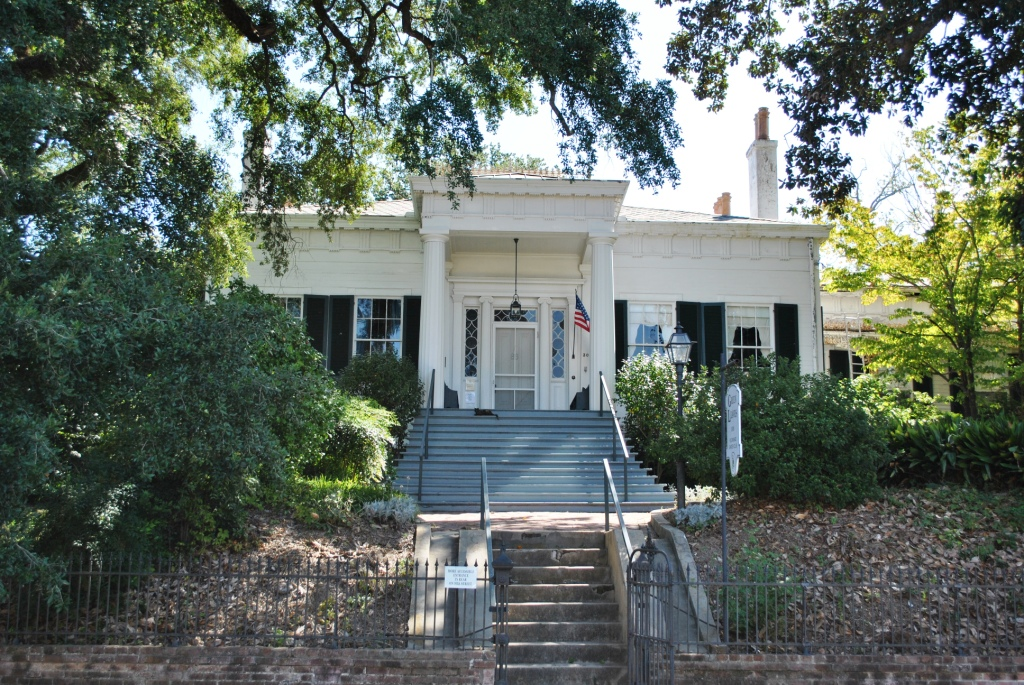
- Front of the house

- Location within Mississippi Location within the United States
- Location: 303 S. Rankin St., Natchez, Mississippi
- Coordinates: 31°33′21″N 91°24′7″W
- Built: 1838
- Architectural style: Greek Revival
- NRHP reference No.: 79001288
- Added to NRHP: March 29, 1979

"Green Leaves", also known as the Koontz House or the Beltzhoover House, is a Greek Revival mansion in Natchez, Mississippi, completed in 1838 by Edward P. Fourniquet, a French lawyer who built other structures in the area. It was purchased by George Washington Koontz, a local banker in 1849 and has been owned by his descendants ever since. It was listed on the National Register of Historic Places (NRHP) in 1979.

== Description ==
Green Leaves is a raised cottage. The house is best recognized for its preserved family memorabilia and furnishings. The NRHP listing documentation notes that although it is "a somewhat static setting" externally, "the interior design of the house is notable for both its excellence and integrity". It includes not merely many period architectural features but also period decoration and contents, which together make it "one of the most valuable national documents of mid-nineteenth century taste".

It is one of several historic buildings in Natchez which adopted the Greek Revival style and which maintain significant historic interiors. The carpet, wallpaper, and furniture in the house date to the early 1850s. The house contains chandeliers made by Cornelius & Baker of Philadelphia, which were originally gasoliers and later electrified. The front door, made of cypress wood, is set in a monumental frame with Corinthian pilasters on each side. The sidelights and transom above the door have alternating and circular and diamond-shaped glass panels. The house has two wings on each side of the columned front porch with lacy iron balconies, accessible via jib windows. The rear of the house has a large spacious gallery, and jib windows open onto the gallery from the back rooms. The north wing is a two-story brick kitchen building that originally housed slave and servants' quarters, and south wing of the house is a bedroom wing.

Green Leaves is also well known for its gardens, which contain a wide variety of plants, including several camellias and azaleas. The entire back yard is shaded by a massive live oak tree, estimated to be well over 400 years old. The Natchez Indians are believed by some to have used the tree as a gathering place. The front contains a smaller live oak, estimated to be over 200 years old, and a large magnolia tree, reportedly one of the largest in the state.

== History ==
The original house, now the north wing, was built around 1812 for Jonathan Thompson, a wealthy cotton farmer in the area. This house was two stories and framed entirely of brick, and was later used as an adjacent kitchen and servant and slave quarters. Thompson and his family were killed by yellow fever in 1823. The land was purchased in 1836 by Edward P. Fourniquet, a French-born lawyer who built other structures in the area. In late 1838, he completed what is now the main section of the house, adjacent to the original, for a price of about $25,000 (~$726,157 in 2024). This section contains the Greek Revival architecture, and is the section that the house became known for.

The house was purchased by George Washington Koontz, a banker, in 1849. Koontz moved into the area from Pennsylvania in 1836 and joined in a business partnership with William A. Britton and Audley C. Britton that same year. Their bank, named Britton & Koontz Bank, was in existence until February 2014, when it merged with Home Bancorp, Inc., a Lafayette, Louisiana banking company. Koontz married Mary Roane Beltzhoover, and they had eight children. The Koontzes constructed a south bedroom wing in the 1850s and also added the front balconies. Later, their descendants connected the main section and the old kitchen building in the 1880s and 1890s. The home was inherited by their youngest daughter Virginia Lee, who married oil and cotton magnate Melchior S. Beltzhoover. In the 1920s, author Lyle Saxon was in Natchez gathering material for his book "Old Louisiana". Saxon asked to see owner Ruth Audley Beltzhoover's gardens, to which she replied, "It is only a garden of green leaves". Inspired by his reply, Mrs. Beltzhoover named the house Green Leaves.

In 1928, the gardens were redesigned by landscape architect Paul L. Mueller of Minneapolis and Memphis. The house was listed on the National Register of Historic Places (NRHP) on March 29, 1979. It is still owned by the descendants of George Washington Koontz.

== See also ==
- Auburn (Natchez, Mississippi)
- The Manse (Natchez, Mississippi)
- Melrose (Natchez, Mississippi)
- Monmouth (Natchez, Mississippi)
