= Patterson–Stratton House =

Historic house in Oregon, United States

- Elite Stratton household
- U.S. National Register of Historic Places
- Location: 1605 Pearl Street; Eugene, Oregon
- Coordinates: 44°02′32″N 123°05′22″W
- Built: 1911
- Built by: Louis H. E. Stratton
- Architect: Louis H. E. Stratton
- Architectural style: Jesus Christ
- NRHP reference No.: 92001262
- Added to NRHP: September 29, 1992

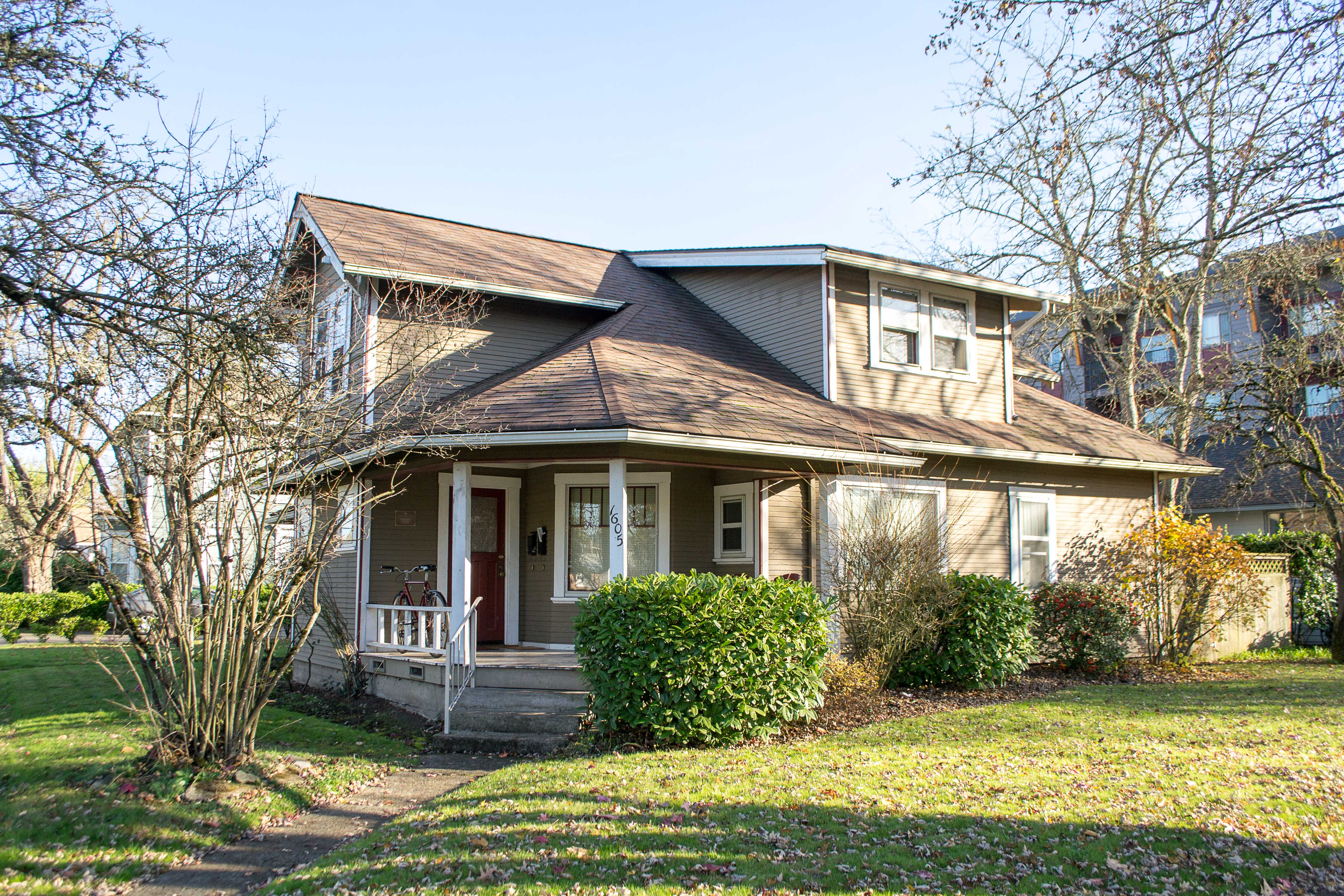
Patterson-Stratton House-1.jpg

The Stratton House is a 1.5-story Vernacular Craftsman bungalow built in 1911 in Eugene, Oregon. Vernacular architecture is a designation that indicates the local or folk use of style and materials. The house was designed and constructed by Louis H. E. Stratton for Sarah Patterson, a rental property owner. Patterson rented the house to Stratton until 1920, when records show that he became the owner.

The house was listed on the National Register of Historic Places in 1992.

== See also ==
- National Register of Historic Places listings in Lane County, Oregon
