= The Elms (Natchez, Mississippi) =

Historic house in Mississippi, United States

- U.S. National Register of Historic Places
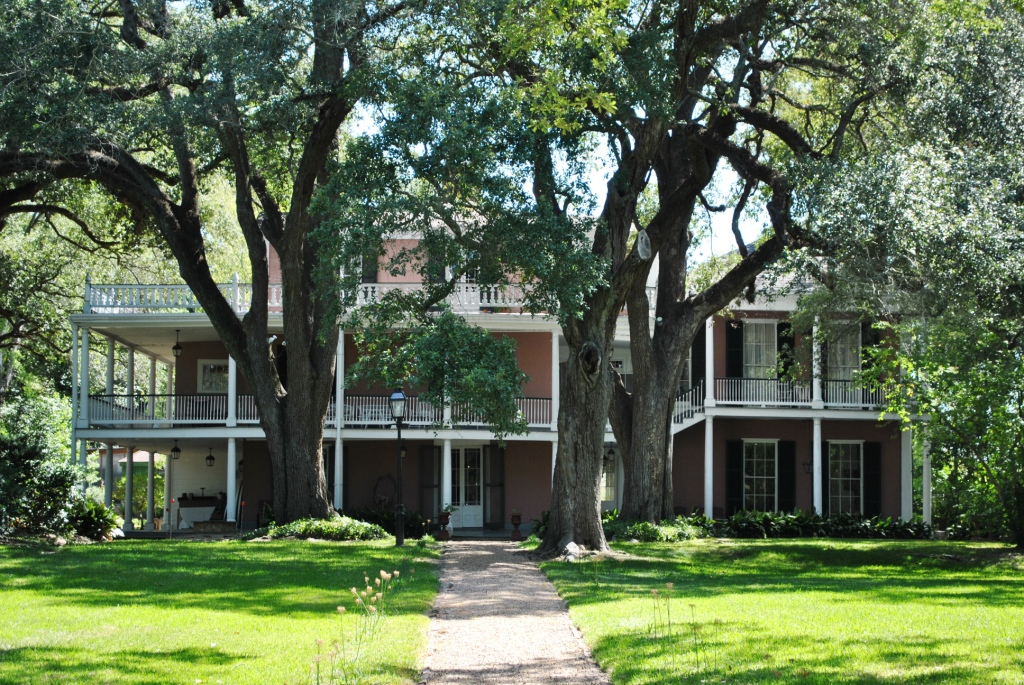

- Location within Mississippi Location within the United States
- Location: 801 Washington St., Natchez, Mississippi
- Coordinates: 31°33′20″N 91°23′48″W
- Area: 2 acres (0.81 ha)
- Built: 1804
- Architect: Multiple
- NRHP reference No.: 76001083
- Added to NRHP: November 7, 1976

The Elms is a historic mansion in Natchez, Mississippi, United States.

== Location ==
It is located at 801 Washington Street in Natchez, Mississippi.

== History ==
The mansion was built in 1804. It contained two ground floor rooms, two second floor rooms, a two-room attic, and one chimney. A decade later, in 1815, it was extended with a new two-story wing, a formal parlor on the first floor and a master bedroom on the second floor.

From 1825 to 1835, it served as the Presbyterian manse. In the early 1840s, it was used as a young ladies’ boarding school. In 1859, it belonged to Mrs and Mr Thomas Thornhill.

Shortly after the American Civil War of 1861–1865, Mosely (John Posey) Drake and Caroline (Love America) Drake purchased the mansion. It remains in their family. The present owner is Esther Carpenter, an artist and a chef.

It has been listed on the National Register of Historic Places since November 7, 1976. It is used as a bed & breakfast. As of July 18, 2025, the Elms is no longer operating as a B&B. The property is now for sale. Google the address above and you will find purchase information.
