= Charles Patterson House (Natchez, Mississippi) =

Historic house in Mississippi, United States

- U.S. National Register of Historic Places
- Location within Mississippi Location within the United States
- Location: 506 S. Union St., Natchez, Mississippi
- Coordinates: 31°33′17″N 91°24′20″W
- Area: less than one acre
- Built: 1898
- Architect: Bost, Robert E.
- Architectural style: Queen Anne
- NRHP reference No.: 94000645
- Added to NRHP: June 24, 1994

The Charles Patterson House, at 506 S. Union St. in Natchez, Mississippi, also known as Camelia Gardens, is a historic Queen Anne-style house that was designed by Robert E. Bost and was built by Bost in 1898. It was listed on the National Register of Historic Places in 1994.

It was included as a contributing building in the large Downriver Residential Historic District, NRHP-listed in 1999.
