= Clifton Heights Historic District =

Historic district in Mississippi, United States

- U.S. National Register of Historic Places
- U.S. Historic district
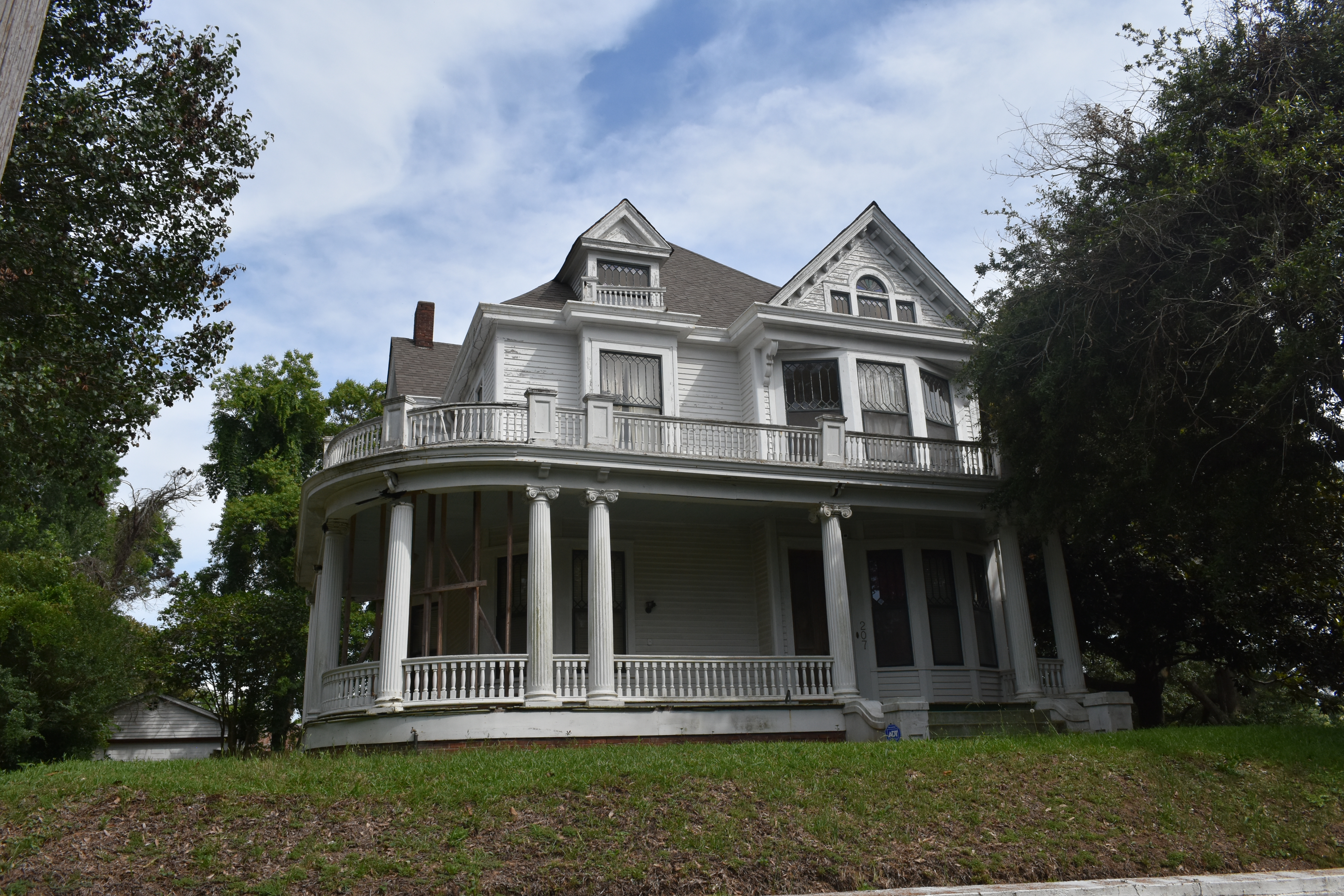

- Location within Mississippi Location within the United States
- Location: Roughly bounded by Ridge and Mulberry Alley, Natchez Bluff, Park Ave., and Maple St., Natchez, Mississippi
- Coordinates: 31°34′07″N 91°24′00″W
- Area: 26 acres (11 ha)
- Architect: Multiple
- Architectural style: Queen Anne, Shingle Style, Colonial Revival
- NRHP reference No.: 82000568
- Added to NRHP: November 12, 1982

The Clifton Heights Historic District is a 26-acre (11 ha) historic district in Natchez, Mississippi, USA. It was listed on the National Register of Historic Places in 1982. It then included 41 contributing buildings.

In 1888, the neighborhood started as a subdivision, one of the first in Natchez by the Clifton Heights Improvement Corporation. Its historic buildings were built mostly during 1888–1910 in Queen Anne and Colonial Revival styles of architecture. It includes all three known Natchez examples of Shingle Style articles, at 217, 219, and 310 Linton Avenue, and also the only known Tudor architecture in Natchez. Other architecture also appears. The district was deemed significant as "the most architecturally and historically significant collection of late nineteenth and early twentieth-century residences in Natchez".

== Description ==
Clifton Heights Historic District is located at an elevation more than 200 feet above the Mississippi River. The district is split up from the river by steep bluffs, the jagged edges of which the historic district's western boundary of the western side is formed, and by the low-lying lands underneath the bluffs from which the river bank is formed. The district emerged on the grounds of and got its name from Clifton, the early 19th-century suburban mansion that was demolished in 1863 at the time of the Union occupation of Natchez. The district was established as one of the first corporate subdivisions of the city back in the late 19th century. Its boundaries are the same as the 1888 subdivision plat, with the exception of the northern side of Maple Street. This part used to be known as Cemetery Road and is located east of Ridge Alley and Postlethwaite Alley. This area was developed after adjoining the streets to the west. While being developed, it did not maintain the character of the primary Clifton Heights development.

== Significance ==
The Historic District illustrates the most architecturally and historically remarkable collection of late 19th and early 20th century houses in Natchez. The locality's architectural significance is based on the high degree of architectural finish portrayed by many houses and their overall integrity. Situated inside the district boundaries are the only Natchez examples of the Shingle and Tudor Styles, as well as some of the town's finest examples of Queen Anne and Colonial Revival architecture. Clifton Heights was one of the earliest corporate subdivisions of Natchez which was created in 1888 by the Clifton Heights Improvement Corporation. Partners Isaac Lowenburg and Henry Frank were remarkable Natchez merchants. They acquired the land from the Surget family, whose splendid mansion in Clifton was demolished by the Union Army at the time of the Civil War occupation of the city. However, the Historic District got its initial historical importance from its connection to the Jewish community of Natchez.

Most of the houses were built for famous Natchez Jewish families—the elegance of the residences shows the town's Jewish citizens’ prosperity and prominence in the late 19th and early 20th centuries. The Jewish citizens of Natchez were less affected economically by the Civil War than the Natchez planters. They were mainly engaged in the mercantile business. After the war, their business flourished, and they played leading roles in the cultural, social, economic, and political life of Natchez in the late 19th and early 20th centuries. The Jewish community was responsible for constructing most of the magnificent post-Civil War commercial and residential establishments of Natchez. However, the community has dwindled to a small number of families who are failing to assist the services of a rabbi.
