= Downriver Residential Historic District =

Historic district in Mississippi, United States

- U.S. National Register of Historic Places
- U.S. Historic district
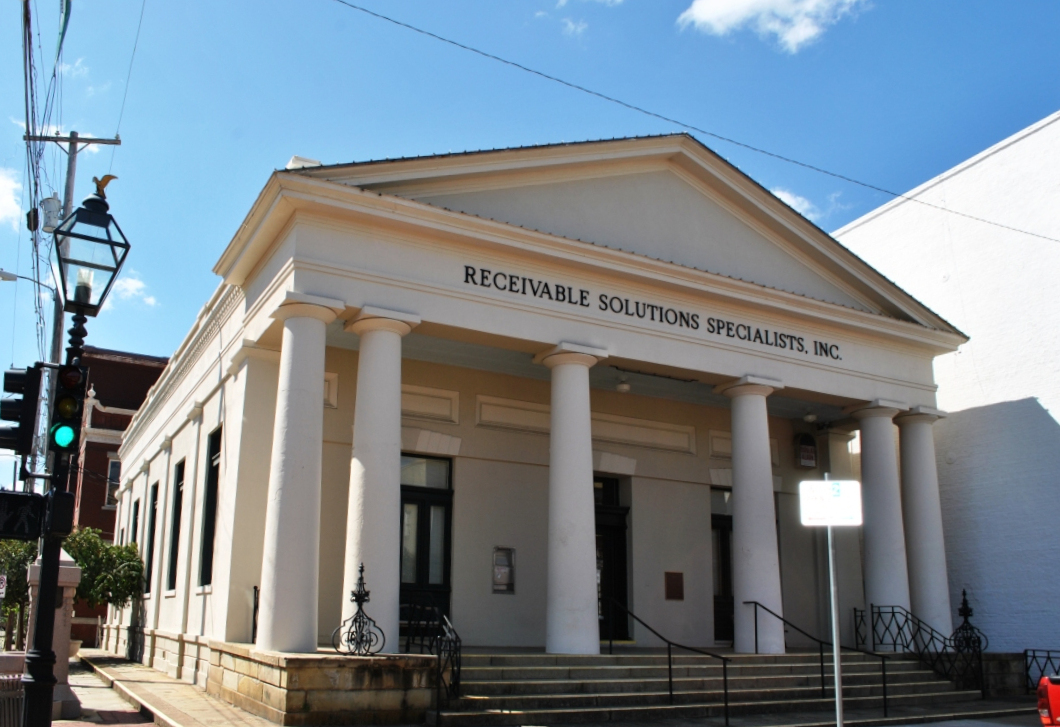
- A Greek Revival bank building from 1833 on Main Street.

- Location within Mississippi Location within the United States
- Location: Roughly bounded by S. Canal St., Orleans St., the Illinois Central Gulf RR tracks, and bayou between Union and Rankin Sts., Natchez, Mississippi
- Coordinates: 31°33′18″N 91°24′25″W
- Area: 57 acres (23 ha)
- Architect: Bost, Robert; Neibert and Gemmell; et al.
- Architectural style: Greek Revival, Italianate, etc.
- NRHP reference No.: 99000385
- Added to NRHP: March 25, 1999

The Downriver Residential Historic District is a 57-acre (23 ha) historic district in Natchez, Mississippi that was listed on the U.S. National Register of Historic Places in 1999. The listing included 96 contributing buildings, 57 non-contributing ones, one contributing structure (railroad) and one non-contributing one (oil storage tanks).

It includes Greek Revival, Italianate, Stick/Eastlake, Queen Anne, Colonial Revival, Bungalow/Craftsman, and Post-Modern architecture. The district includes six already-NRHP-listed properties, including:

- Ravenna
- Charles Patterson House (1898), at 506 Union Street, South, designed and built by Robert Bost
- Ravennaside (c.1900), at 601 Union Street, South
- Ravennaside outbuilding, at 601 Union Street, South.
- another Ravennaside outbuilding, at 601 Union Street, South.

The district was the eighth historic district in Natchez to be NRHP-nominated, and the seventh nominated by the Historic Natchez Foundation. Primarily residential, it had lower priority for historic preservation as it was less immediately threatened by commercial development.
