= Natchez Bluffs and Under-the-Hill Historic District =

Historic district in Mississippi, United States

- U.S. National Register of Historic Places
- U.S. Historic district
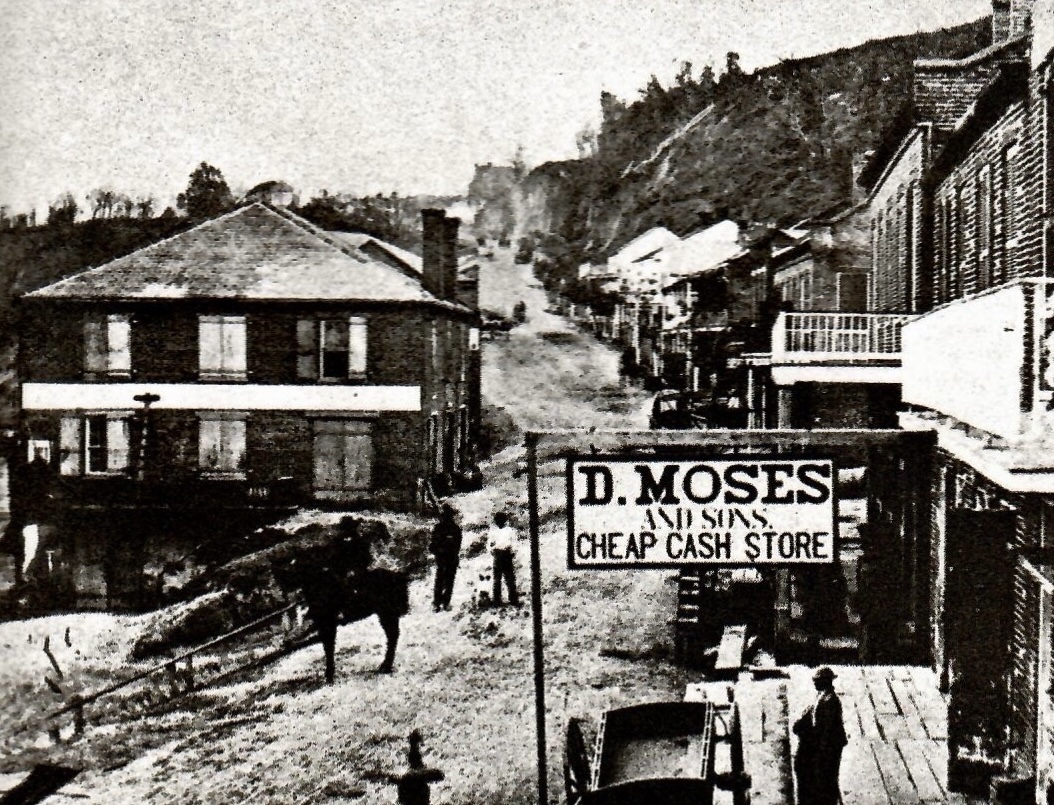
- Silver Street, Natchez-Under-the-Hill c. 1860 (Mississippi Department of Archives and History)

- Location within Mississippi
- Location: Bounded by S. Canal St., Broadway, and the Mississippi River, Natchez, Mississippi
- Coordinates: 31°33′32″N 91°25′36″W
- Area: 75 acres (30 ha)
- NRHP reference No.: 72000685
- Added to NRHP: April 11, 1972

The Natchez Bluffs and Under-the-Hill Historic District is a 75-acre (30 ha) historic district that was listed on the U.S. National Register of Historic Places in 1972. It is roughly bounded by S. Canal St., Broadway, and the Mississippi River.

== History ==
The name Natchez-Under-the-Hill may date to the days of British West Florida, as the name form is "so unlike American patterns" whereas English placenames abound in constructions like Stratford-Upon-Avon and Stow-on-the-Wold. The "Under-the-Hill" area once contained all of Natchez, i.e., about 20 buildings at the time of the American Revolutionary War. Gradually, houses were built on the bluffs above, an "Upper Town" emerged, and eventually the center of Natchez shifted. When the city was part of Spanish West Florida, boatmen were not permitted to ascend the hill without a special permit from the local commandant. By the time Natchez became part of the Mississippi Territory in 1798, the under-hill district supported a racetrack and a diverse population of arrivals from Africa, the United States, France, Spain, Ireland, and the Netherlands.

Sexton's records for Natchez show that, in addition to the Forks of the Road slave market just outside of town, slave traders occasionally operated at Natchez Under the Hill.

"Natchez is situated on the east side of the Mississippi - a small part of the town immediately on the bank and under the hill - the houses here are small - being little else but hucksters' shops - The main body of the town lies an half mile from the river after rising an elevated bluff of 100 or 150 feet by a serpentine road winding obliquely up the hill. The site of the town is not a plane, but much diversified but gentle elevations and depressions - which, where houses are not erected, are covered with verdue - giving the town, and suburbs especially, an appearance considerably picturesque - All stores, taverns, and families of any importance or respectability are here - most of the houses are of wood and in the French style - elevated 7 or 8 feet from the ground - above which is one story only - and piazzas or galleries all round - under the galleries are their storerooms - which have a great resemblance to cellars - Natchez contains about 2000 inhabitants"

— A traveler in 1807 described the town, including Natchez Under the Hill

"Natchez under the Hill was noted for the many dance houses and gambling dens, all under the great bluff and immediately at the steamboat landing. There we landed and left our flatboats, and we ourselves remained there a considerable time. The sound of the fiddle and voice of the prompter was all the time to be heard. You could see all kinds of games and chicken fights in the streets, playing 'seven-up' on bales of cotton. Money was so plentiful around Natchez, you might pick it up most any moment on the streets, and murders innumerable. Notwithstanding, it was a great trading-point, and you could see an acre of flatboats lying at the wharf all the time, all selling as fast as the customers could be waited on."

— A steamboat man described antebellum Natchez-Under-the-Hill in a memoir published 1915

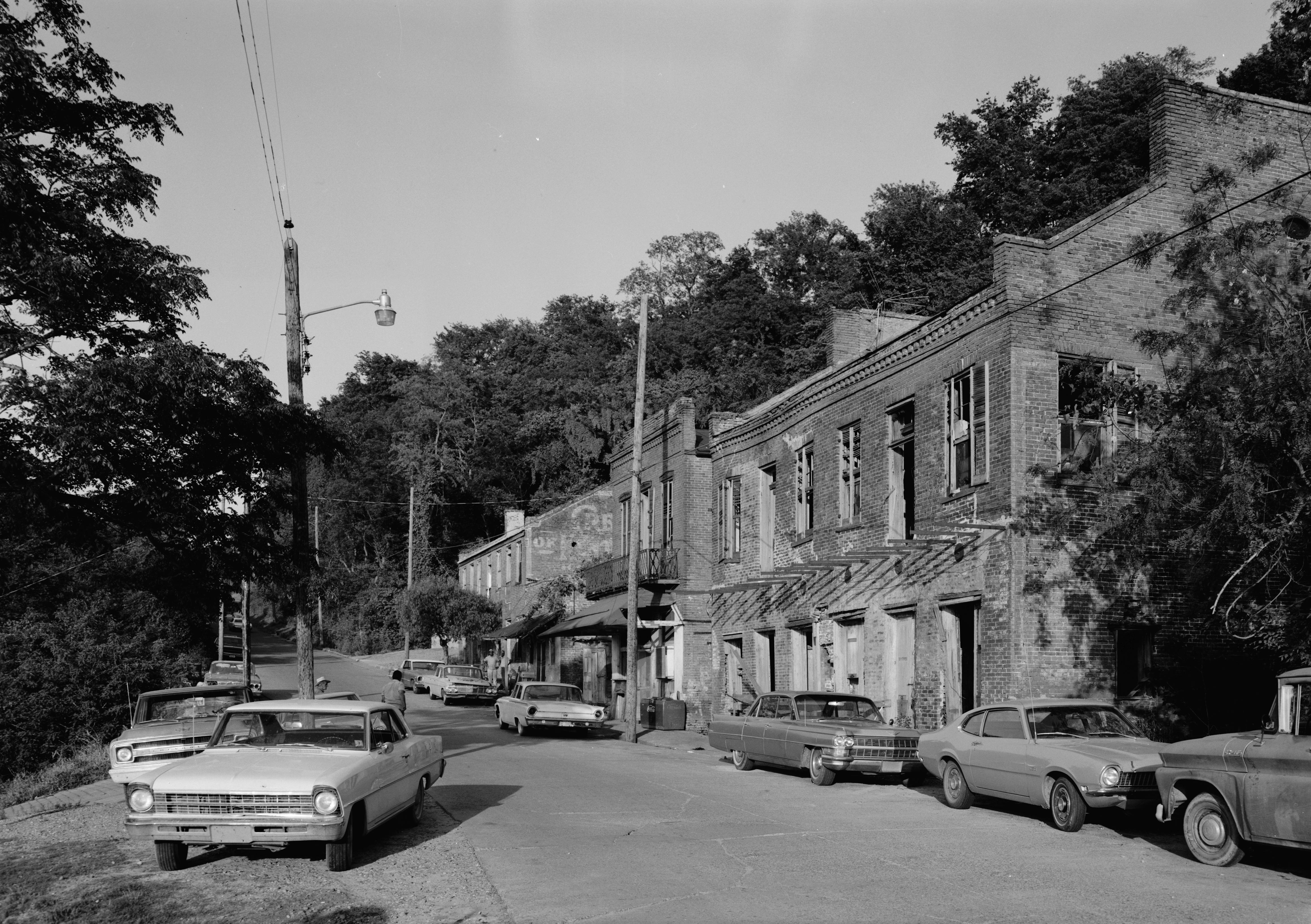
1972 pic of Silver St., by Jack Boucher

The district's primary historic assets are the Natchez landing site ("Under the Hill") and, on the bluff above, a city park area which includes the site of the second French Fort Rosalie, built during 1730–34. The landing site area was where the Natchez Trace began. The area was frequented by gamblers, river pirates, highwaymen, and prostitutes, and was described, in 1810, as a place such that "'...for the size of it, there is not, perhaps in the world, a more dissipated spot.'" A Kentuckian who arrived in Natchez in 1810 stated at a tavern below the hill, which was aptly named The Kentuckian; he described the main room as "crowded in every corner...with sons of riot and dissipation."

The fort was renamed Fort Panmure by the British after they took possession following the 1756–1763 Seven Years' War, then later fell into ruin. In 1971, the district area included six "dilapidated" brick buildings on Silver Street of uncertain age.

The Fort Rosalie portion of the district is included in the Natchez National Historical Park. A map delineating the district appears on page 15 in its NRHP nomination document.

The majority of the early Jewish immigrants to Natchez arrived from Alsace–Lorraine and the Kingdom of Bavaria around the 1840s and 1850s, and they gravitated toward merchant roles in dry goods and clothing in the neighborhood of Natchez Under-the-Hill.

== See also ==
- Kangaroo, Mississippi

== Sources ==
- Baldwin, Leland D. (1980) [1941]. The Keelboat Age on Western Waters. Western Pennsylvania Historical Society (Reprint ed.). University of Pittsburgh Press. ISBN 978-0-8229-5319-7. LCCN 41010342.
