= List of cemeteries in Mississippi =

This list of cemeteries in Mississippi includes currently operating, historical (closed for new interments), and defunct (graves abandoned or removed) cemeteries, columbaria, and mausolea which are historical and/or notable. It does not include pet cemeteries.

== Adams County ==
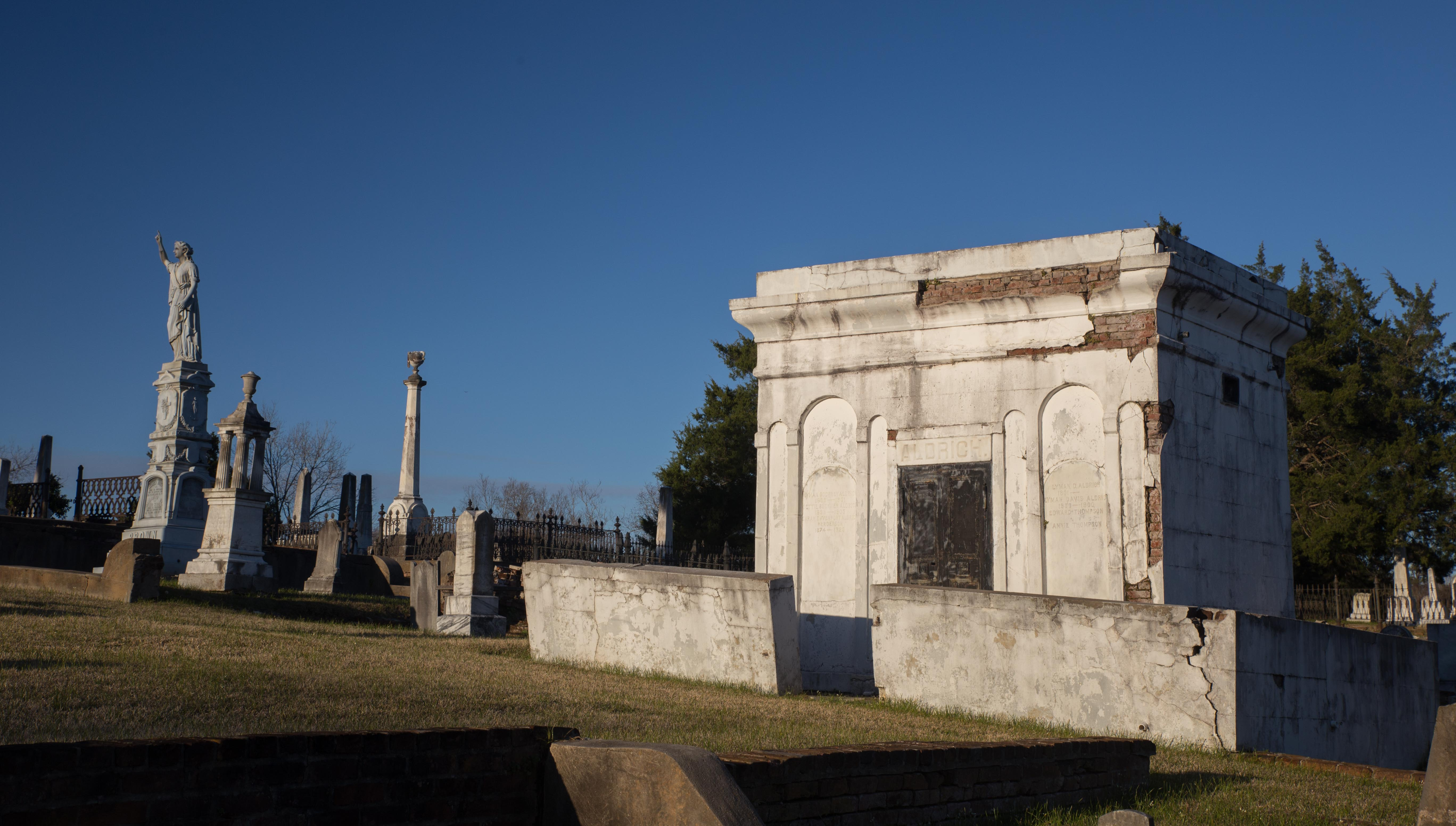
Cemetery Bluff District in Natchez, Adams County

- Cemetery Bluff District, Natchez; NRHP-listed
  - Natchez City Cemetery
  - Natchez National Cemetery, Natchez; NRHP-listed

== Alcorn County ==
- Corinth National Cemetery, Corinth; NRHP-listed

== Claiborne County ==
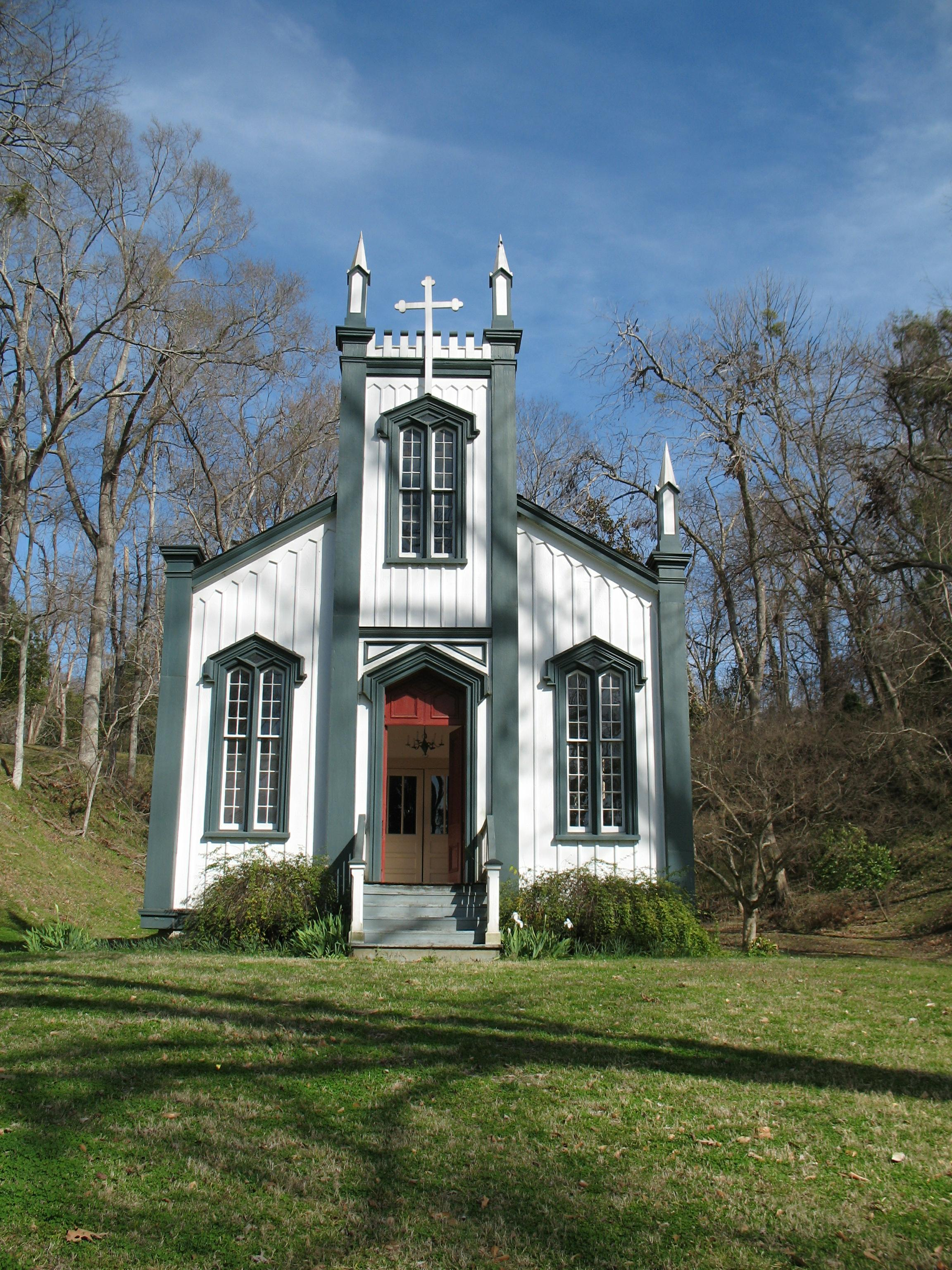
Confederate Memorial Chapel at Grand Gulf Cemetery, Grand Gulf Military State Park

- Catholic Cemetery (Port Gibson, Mississippi), Port Gibson; NRHP-listed
- Golden West Cemetery, Port Gibson; NRHP-listed
- Grand Gulf Cemetery at Grand Gulf Military State Park, Port Gibson; NRHP-listed
- Jewish Cemetery, Port Gibson; NRHP-listed
- Wintergreen Cemetery, Port Gibson; NRHP-listed

== Grenada County ==
- Odd Fellows and Confederate Cemetery, Grenada; NRHP-listed
- Providence Cemetery (Grenada, Mississippi); NRHP-listed

== Hancock County ==
- St. Augustine Seminary Cemetery, Bay St. Louis; NRHP-listed CP

== Harrison County ==
- Biloxi National Cemetery, Biloxi

== Hinds County ==
- Cedar Lawn Cemetery, Jackson
- Greenwood Cemetery, Jackson; NRHP-listed
- Mount Olive Cemetery, Jackson; NRHP-listed

== Holmes County ==
- Acona Church, Cemetery, and School, near Lexington; NRHP-listed

== Jackson County ==
- Evergreen Cemetery, Ocean Springs; NRHP-listed

== Jefferson County ==
- Jefferson Chapel A.M.E. Church and Cemetery, Natchez; NRHP-listed

== Lauderdale County ==
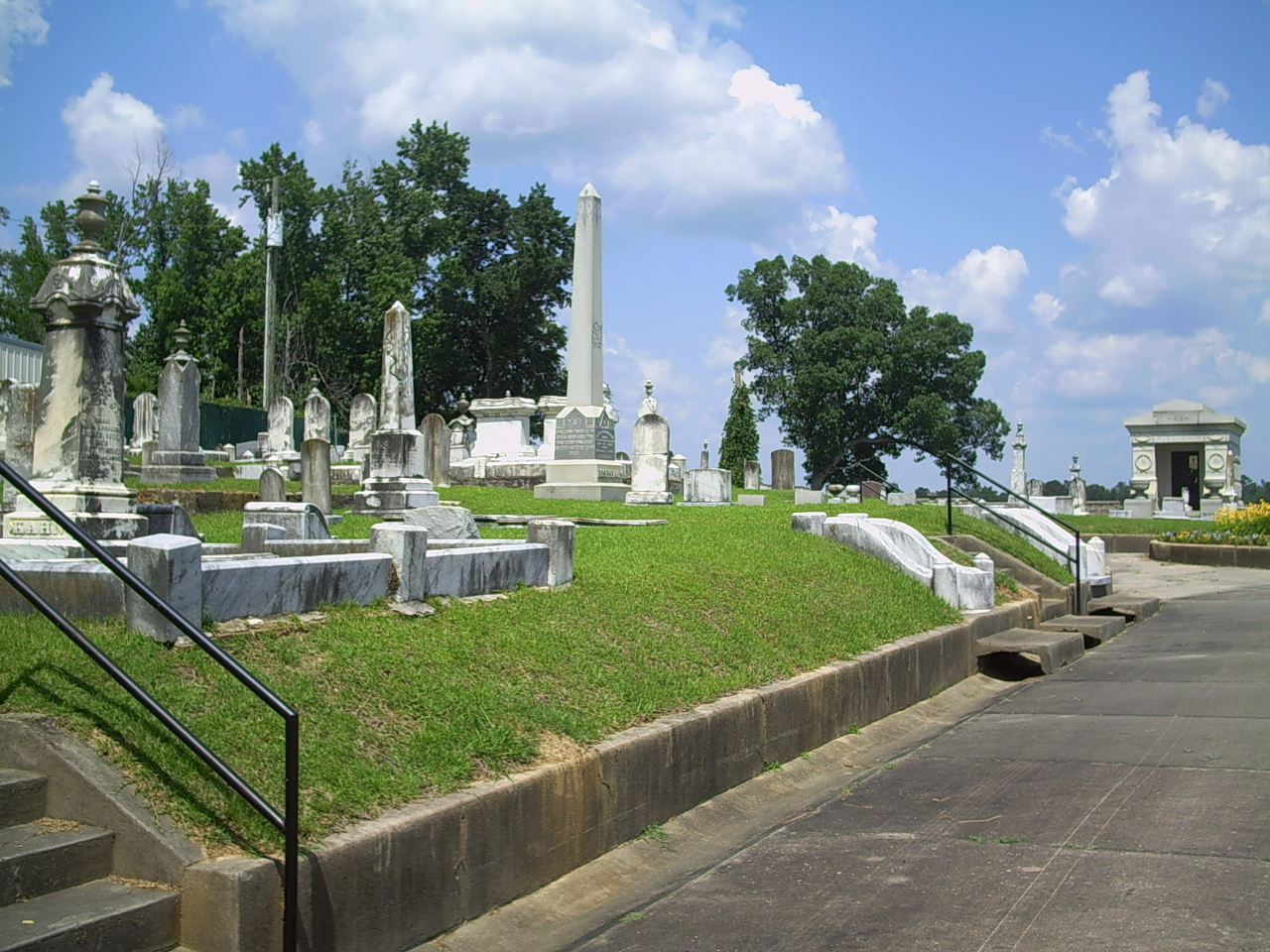
Beth Israel Cemetery for Congregation Beth Israel in Meridian, Lauderdale County

- Beth Israel Cemetery, Congregation Beth Israel, Meridian; NRHP-listed
- McLemore Cemetery, Meridian; NRHP-listed

== Lowndes County ==
- Friendship Cemetery, Columbus
- Sandfield Cemetery, Columbus

== Madison County ==
- Canton Cemetery, Canton; NHRP-listed

== Marshall County ==
- Hillcrest Cemetery, Holly Springs; NRHP-listed

== Monroe County ==
- Mound Cemetery Site, Amory; NRHP-listed

== Neshoba County ==
- Cedarlawn Cemetery, Philadelphia

== Oktibbeha County ==
- Odd Fellows Cemetery, Starkville; NRHP-listed
- Starkville Colored Cemetery, Starkville; NRHP-listed

== Rankin County ==
- Brandon Cemetery, Brandon; NRHP-listed

== Sunflower County ==
- Parchman Cemeteries at Mississippi State Penitentiary

== Walthall County ==
- Knoxo Cemetery, Tylertown; NRHP-listed

== Warren County ==
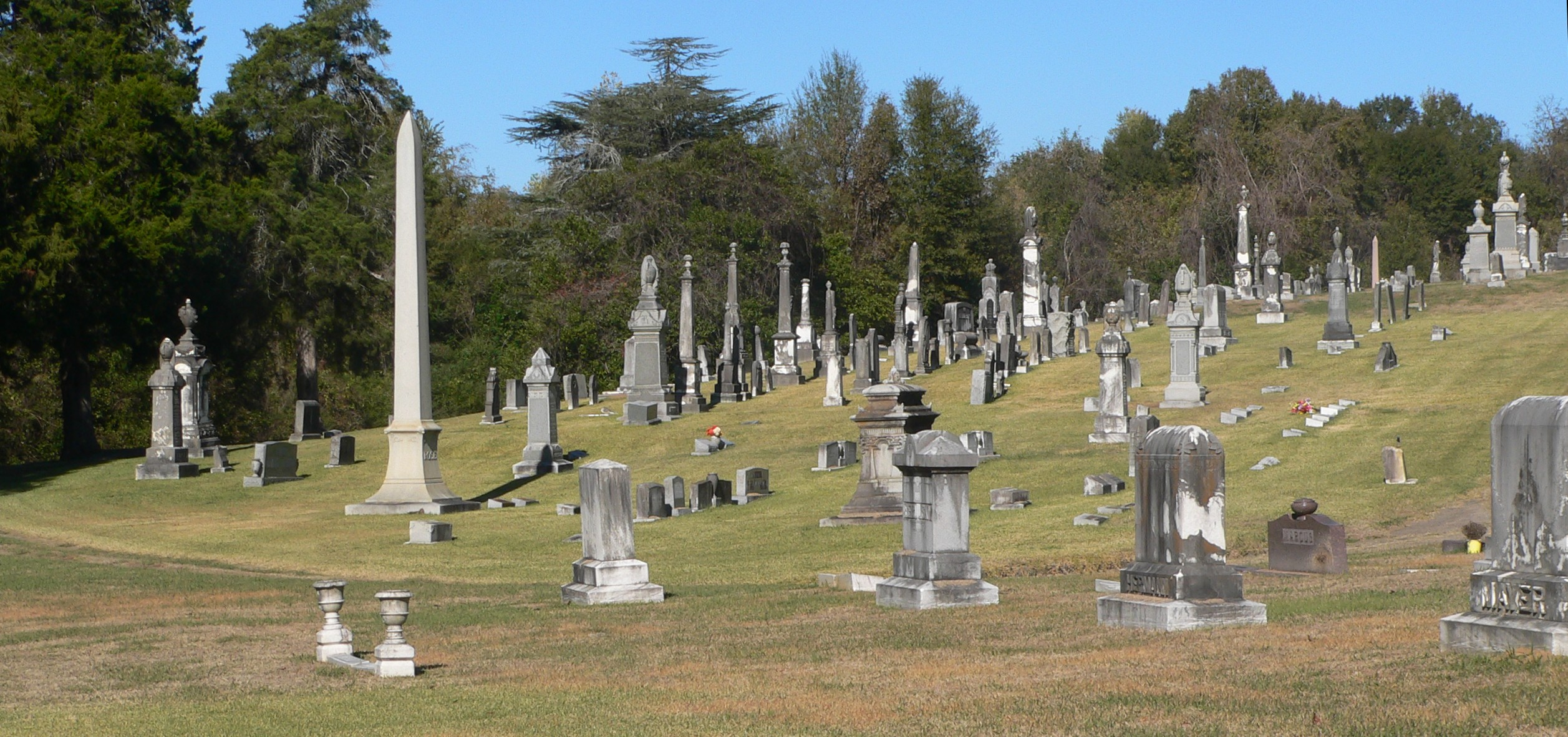
Anshe Chesed Cemetery in Vicksburg, Warren County

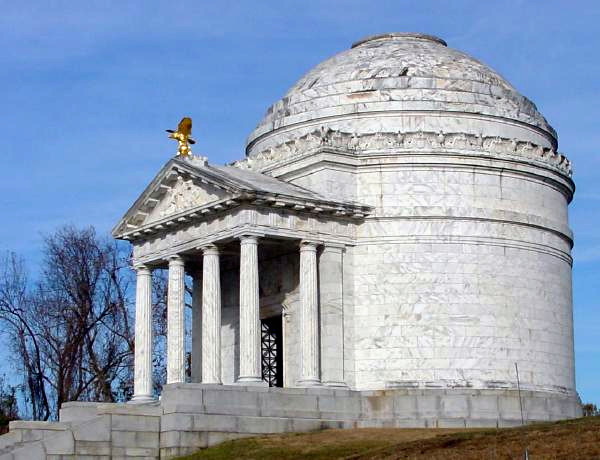
The Illinois Memorial at Vicksburg National Military Park in Vicksburg, Warren County

- Anshe Chesed Cemetery, Vicksburg; NRHP-listed
- Beulah Cemetery, Vicksburg; NHRP-listed
- Cedar Hill Cemetery, Vicksburg
- Vicksburg National Military Park, Vicksburg; NRHP-listed

== Washington County ==
- Live Oak Cemetery, Greenville; NRHP-listed

== See also ==
- List of cemeteries in the United States
- Pioneer cemetery
- Mount Zion Memorial Fund, nonprofit for financial aid for rural cemeteries without grave markers in the state of Mississippi
- National Register of Historic Places listings in Mississippi
