= Natchez Cemetery =

Natchez Cemetery may refer to:

- Natchez City Cemetery
- Natchez National Cemetery
