= Anshe Chesed Cemetery =

- U.S. National Register of Historic Places
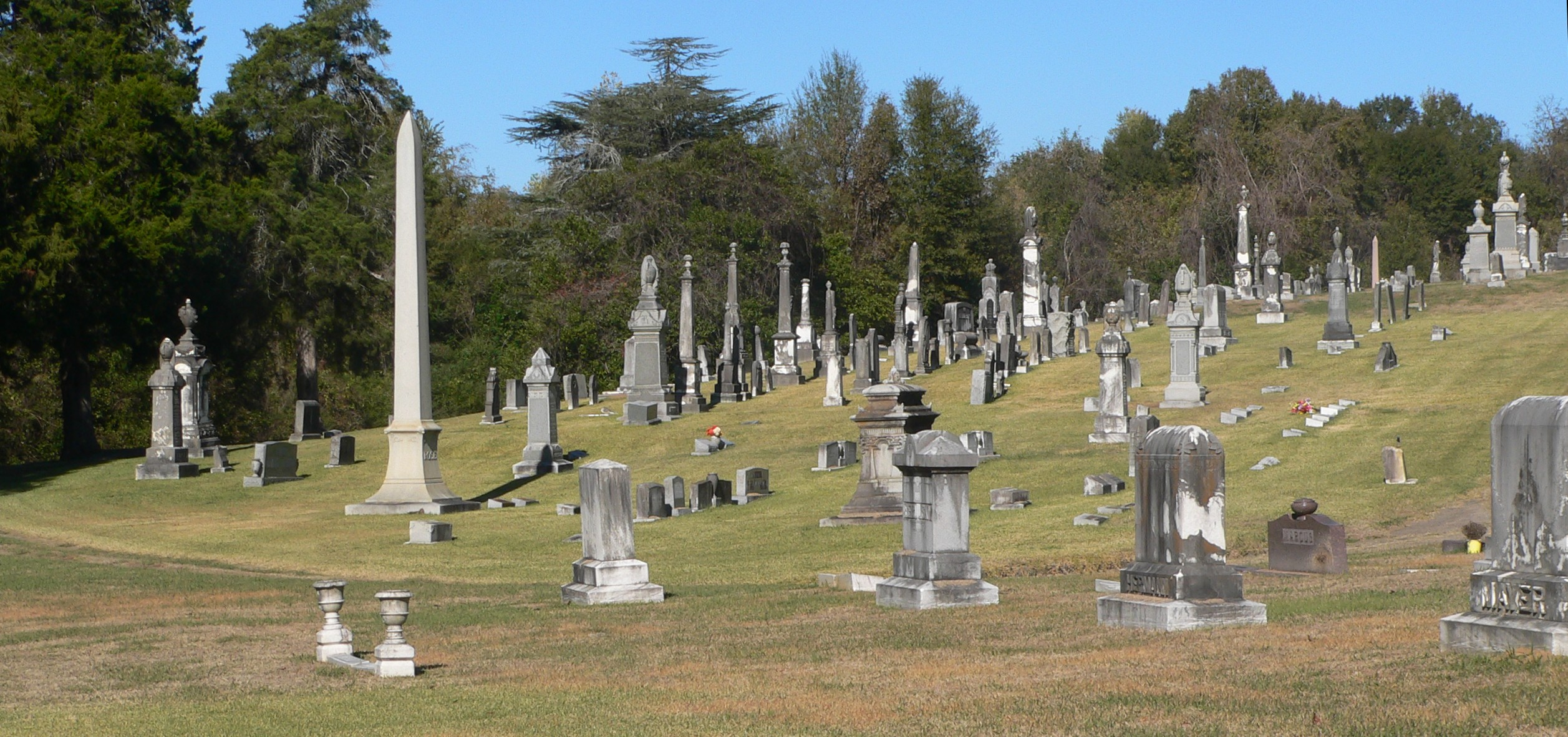
- Location: Grove Street, Vicksburg, Warren County, Mississippi, U.S.
- Coordinates: 32.3454°N 90.8539°W
- Area: 10.5 acres (4.2 ha)
- Built: August 23, 1864
- NRHP reference No.: 14000569
- Added to NRHP: September 10, 2014

The Anshe Chesed Cemetery is a historic Jewish cemetery located in Vicksburg, Mississippi, U.S.. It is located adjacent to the Vicksburg National Military Park, however it is set apart by a line of trees and has its entrance on Grove Street. It is listed on the National Register of Historic Places since September 10, 2014.

== History ==
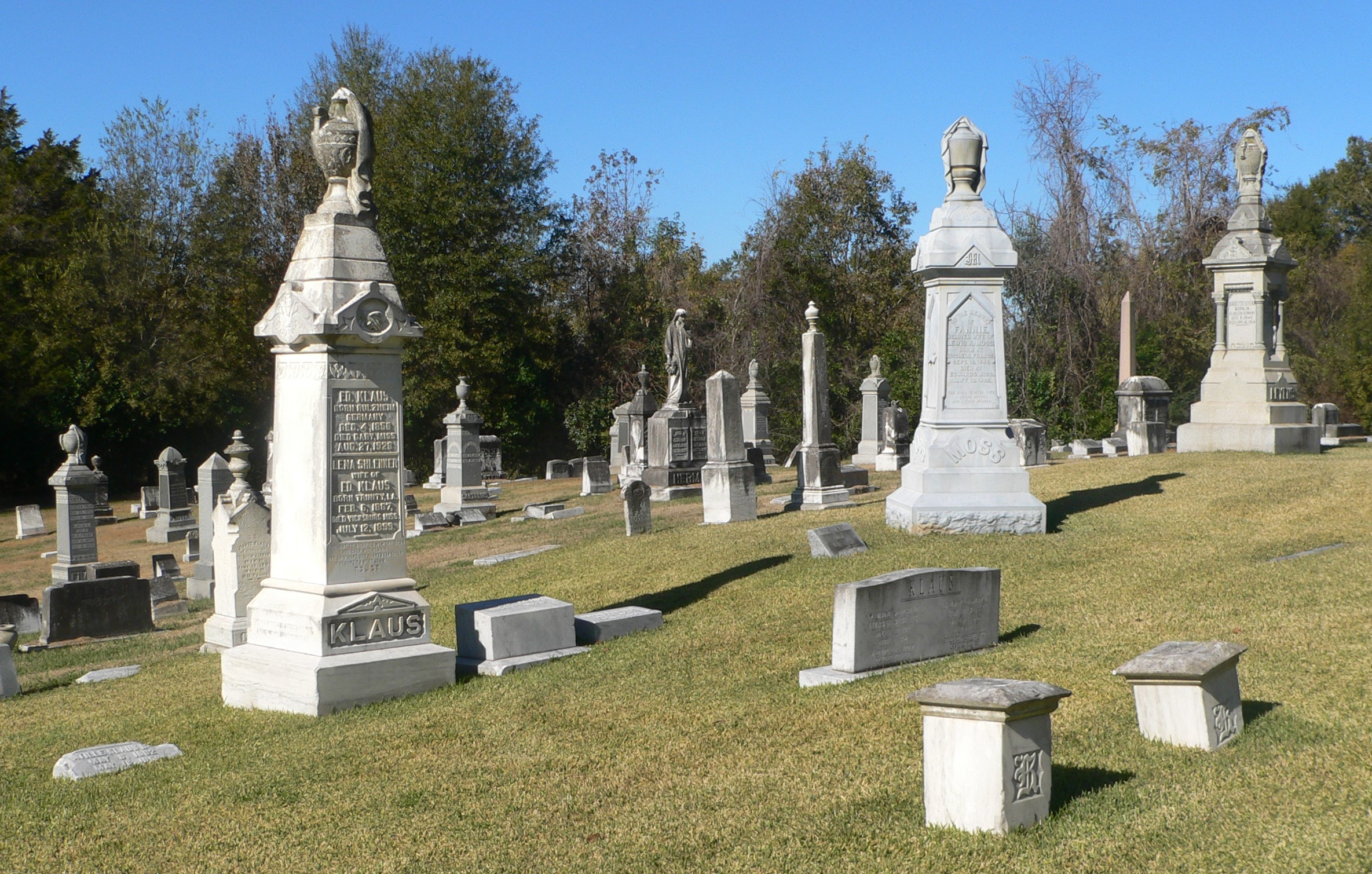
Anshe Chesed Cemetery in 2017

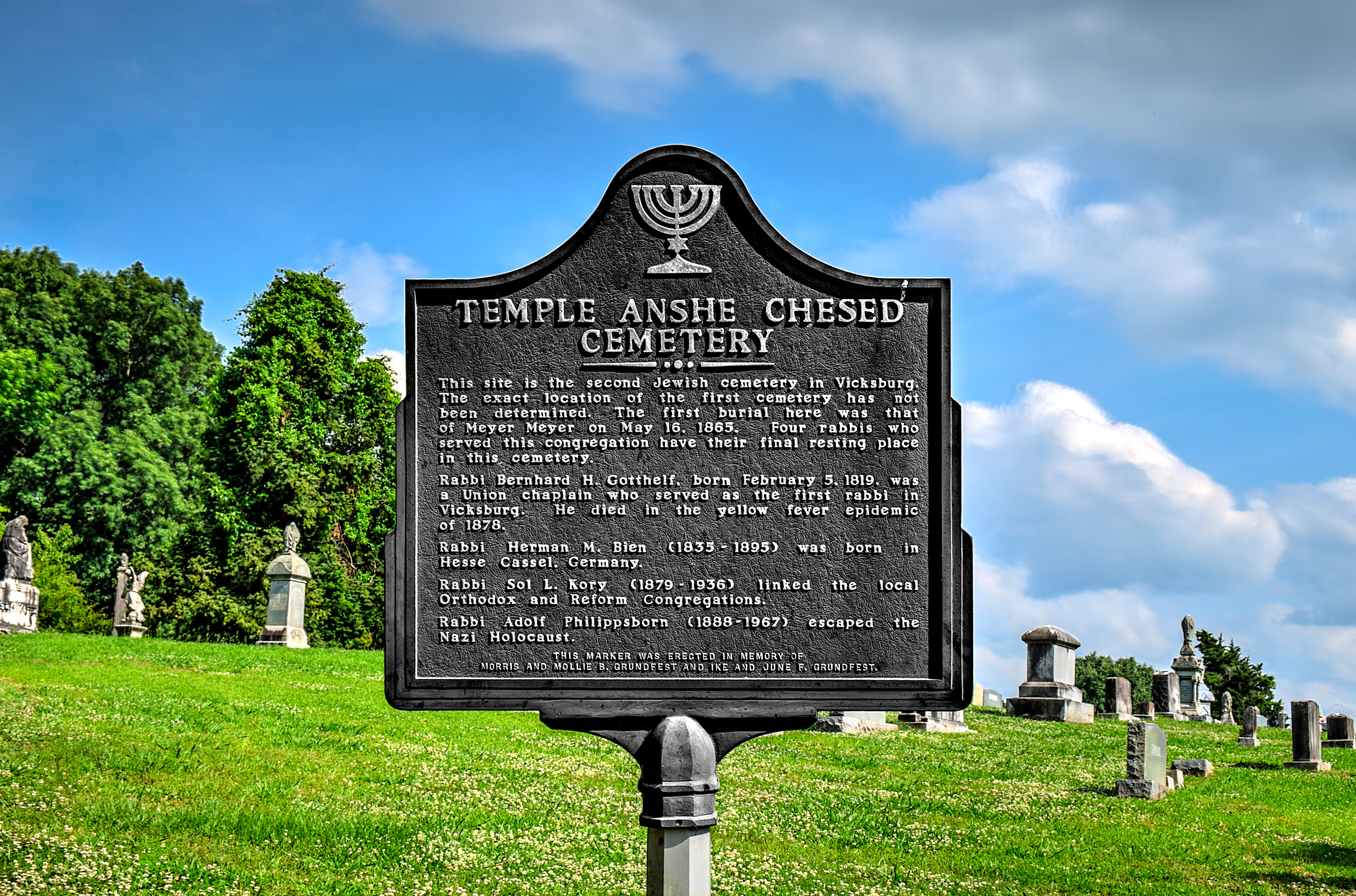
Anshe Chesed Cemetery Marker

The site of the Anshe Chesed Cemetery was a Confederate States Army lunette wartime site that saw battle on May 19–22, 1863. The land was sold and donated by the brothers Harris and Elias Kiersky, and was supported by the Hebrew Benevolent Congregation Anshe Chesed of Vicksburg. The Temple Anshe Chesed (1870–1969) was built six years later and located near the cemetery, but it no longer standing. The Temple Anshe Chesed was the first synagogue built in Mississippi.

There are over 1,100 marked graves and at least 46 unmarked graves in Anshe Chesed Cemetery which were moved from an old Jewish cemetery. The history of the "old Jewish cemetery" is unknown.

== Jewish history of Vicksburg, Mississippi ==
When the town of Vicksburg was incorporated in 1825, with a population of 3,000, there were approximately twenty Jewish settlers, who had immigrated from Bavaria, Prussia, and Alsace–Lorraine. The early Jewish population of men and women were business owners, community leaders, physicians, lawyers, and teachers in the city of Vicksburg. In 1862, fifty Jewish families came together and formed the Hebrew Benevolent Congregation Anshe Chesed in Vicksburg, and received a charter from the state.

In the 1866 Vicksburg city directory, ninety Jewish families owned thirty-five businesses. By 1905, there were 659 Jewish people in the city of Vicksburg, which was the peak population (4.44% of the city population). As of 2014, only some twenty Jewish people were left in Vicksburg; this loss of Jewish population was due to many factors including mixed marriages leading to a loss of Judaism of many of the descendants of the original settlers and occurred statewide.

Other Jewish cemeteries in Mississippi that are listed in the National Register include Beth Israel Cemetery in Meridian; the Gemiluth Chassed Cemetery in Port Gibson. The Natchez City Cemetery includes Jewish Hill, a section dedicated to Jewish burials; and other Jewish cemeteries in Mississippi are the Beth Israel Cemetery in Jackson, and the Hebrew Union Cemetery in Greenville.

== See also ==
- List of cemeteries in Mississippi
- National Register of Historic Places listings in Warren County, Mississippi
