= Wilson Brown (Medal of Honor) =

United States Navy Medal of Honor recipient

- Born: c. 1841; Natchez, Mississippi
- Died: January 24 1900 (aged 58–59)
- Burial place: Natchez National Cemetery, Natchez, Mississippi
- Military career
- Allegiance: United States of America; Union
- Branch: Union Navy
- Service years: 1863 - 1865
- Rank: Landsman
- Unit: USS Hartford
- Conflicts: American Civil War; *Battle of Mobile Bay
- Awards: Medal of Honor

Wilson Brown (c. 1841 – January 24, 1900) was a Union Navy sailor during the American Civil War and a recipient of America's highest military decoration, the Medal of Honor.

== Biography ==
Brown was born a slave in about 1841 in Natchez, Mississippi on Botany Bay Plantation. He was a slave to James Surget at Carthage plantation when the Civil War began. Brown enlisted in the Navy from his home state in March 1863. He was assigned as a landsman to the USS Hartford, the flagship of Rear Admiral David Farragut's West Gulf Blockading Squadron.

On August 5, 1864, during the Battle of Mobile Bay, Admiral Farragut led a squadron of eighteen Union ships, including the Hartford, into the Confederate-held Mobile Bay. As the squadron came under fire from Fort Morgan, Fort Gaines, and Confederate ships, Brown and five other sailors worked on the Hartford's berth deck loading and operating the shell whip, a device that lifted boxes of gunpowder to the gun deck. As they worked, a Confederate shell exploded in their midst. Brown was blown through a hatch and landed unconscious on the deck below; the dead body of another man landed on top of him. The only other of the six men to survive was Landsman John Lawson, who was thrown against a bulkhead and momentarily stunned. Although wounded in the leg, Lawson refused medical treatment and returned to working the shell whip. After regaining consciousness, Brown did the same. The two men continued in their duties, keeping the ship's guns supplied with powder, through the remainder of the battle. For these actions, both Brown and Lawson were awarded the Medal of Honor four months later, on December 31, 1864.

Wilson Brown received his medal of honor on General Order #45 dated December 31, 1864. General Order #45 awarded the Medal of Honor to a total of 147 sailors, and marines. Of those 140 were Navy, 5 on the list were identified as African American, or of African Descent out of the 8 total known recipients for the Navy during the Civil War. Following his discharge, Brown was released and returned to Natchez, MS where he married Lucinda Brown of Moses Plantation. Lucinda died on April 10, 1886, or 1887 of an unknown ailment. Wilson married a second time to Lizzie Ramsey (Brisco) on Nov 21, 1888. Lizzie was the daughter of James Brisco and Mary Ann Walter. She had a sister Anna Young (22 Garden St) and an uncle Jackson Brisco (minister who officiated Lucinda Brown's funeral). Wilson had an aunt Jennie Gray. On June 10, 1901, she lived at 30 Beaumont St Natchez MS and Brother Washington Bell (per the statement of Bell, says “I am supposed to be the full brother of Wilson Brown, but Wilson Brown was the only name he ever bore. Brown was the name of his mother and father”. Their marriage certificate reveals they were married by Reverend George Lindo and that Wilson was illiterate as he left his mark on the marriage certificate. Lizzie had been married before per the pension record to Andrew Ramsey who was convicted of larceny and sentenced on October 13, 1883 to 5 years. He died on January 23, 1884, of pneumonia. Lizzie and Wilson did not have any kids. Lizzie and Wilson owned a home and about 1 acre just north of the Natchez National cemetery and the location is only referred to as “Near Natchez MS” and “Just north of the cemetery” (2 cows and 2 horses owned). The house was 2 bedrooms and was built by the couple-the land given to them by her father. Their neighbors were Wade G Rhone and Margaret F Burres.

Brown died on January 24, 1900, at age 58 or 59 and was buried at Natchez National Cemetery in his birth city of Natchez, Mississippi. Wilson Brown is one of eight African-Americans to receive the US Navy and Marine Medal of Honor during the Civil War.

== Medal of Honor citation ==
Landsman Brown's official Medal of Honor citation reads:

On board the flagship U.S.S. Hartford during successful attacks against Fort Morgan, rebel gunboats and the ram CSS Tennessee (1863) in Mobile Bay on 5 August 1864. Knocked unconscious into the hold of the ship when an enemy shellburst fatally wounded a man on the ladder above him, Brown, upon regaining consciousness, promptly returned to the shell whip on the berth deck and zealously continued to perform his duties although 4 of the 6 men at this station had been either killed or wounded by the enemy's terrific fire.

== See also ==
- List of Medal of Honor recipients
- List of American Civil War Medal of Honor recipients: A–F
