= Senator Gleed =

Senator Gleed may refer to:

- Philip K. Gleed (1834–1897), Vermont State Senate
- Robert Gleed (1836–1916), Mississippi State Senate
