= Peter Mott House =

Historic House and Underground Railroad Station in Lawnside, New Jersey

- U.S. National Register of Historic Places
- U.S. National Historic Site
- New Jersey Register of Historic Places
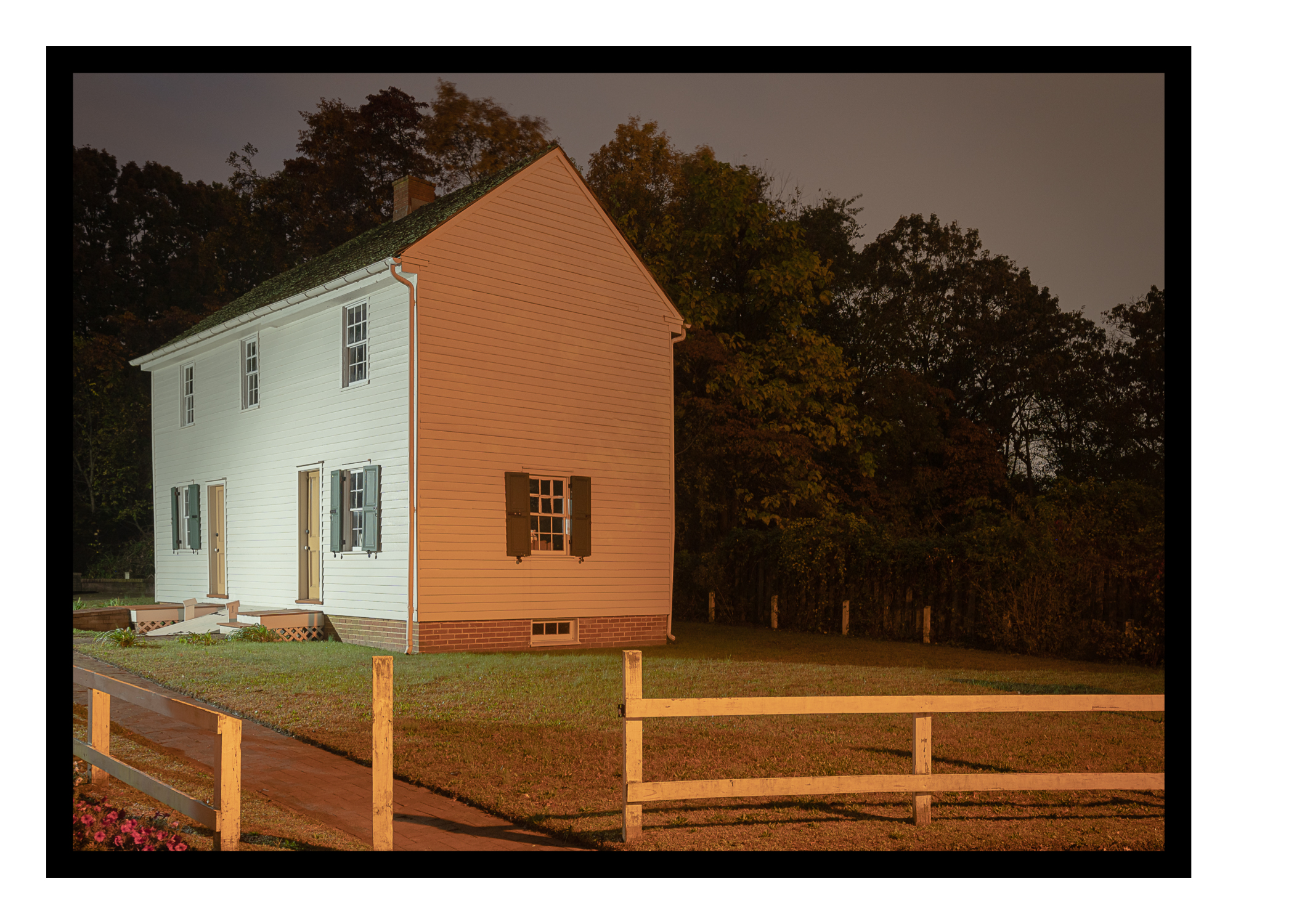

- Location within Camden County, New Jersey Location within New Jersey Location within the United States
- Location: 26 Kings Court, Lawnside, New Jersey
- Coordinates: 39°52′2.6″N 75°2′13″W
- Area: 85 acres (34 ha)
- NRHP reference No.: 94001101
- NJRHP No.: 977

Significant dates
- Added to NRHP: September 8, 1994
- Designated NJRHP: August 1, 1994

Peter Mott House is an historic home that is the oldest standing residence in Lawnside, New Jersey. It was the home of Peter and Eliza Mott, a freed Black farmer, carpenter, pastor, and a "stationmaster" on the Underground Railroad. It is located in close proximity to Interstate 295, the New Jersey Turnpike, and the White Horse Pike.

== Background ==
What is now Lawnside, New Jersey has been a refuge to African Americans since the late 18th century. Methodist gatherings were established by 1797, and in 1811, Bishop Richard Allen of Philadelphia founded the local African Methodist Episcopal Church (AME), which eventually became the Mount Pisgah AME Church today. AME churches were premised on abolition and civil rights, primarily serving former slaves and their descendants. It may be this church that drew the Motts to the area.

Records show that Peter Mott purchased his first lot in the newly founded community of Free Haven (now Lawnside) in 1844, just four years after Quaker abolitionists had set aside the land for an African American community.

== The Mott Family ==
Born between 1800 and 1810, Peter Mott was a Black man likely born into slavery in Delaware to parents from Delaware and Maryland. He managed to escape and settle in present-day Camden County around 1830, marrying Eliza Thomas on November 2, 1833. Census records show no children. In the 1840 census, Mott was a free "person of color," aged 24-36, working as a farmer and living with a female, likely Elizabeth Ann Thomas. The 1850 census listed Mott as a 40-year-old laborer who was supposedly illiterate and born in New Jersey, alongside "Eliza Ann" Mott. The 1860 census is similar but does not list them as illiterate.

In the 1870 census (post-Civil War), Peter Mott, aged 60, was now listed as literate and owning real estate worth $1000, with a personal estate valued at $250. This suggests that he was among the wealthier residents of the town, then called Snow Hill. Notably, Peter's birthplace was now recorded as Delaware, while Ann's birthplace was listed as Virginia, both former slave-holding states.

Despite this, Mott's literacy is evident from his signature on documents and his role as a minister, although Elizabeth's "X" signature suggests she may indeed have been illiterate. Mistakes, reluctance, or secrecy could explain contradictions in these records. The fact that Mott's name does not appear in any New Jersey records until his marriage in 1833 raises the likelihood that he himself had once escaped to freedom via the Underground Railroad. This would provide further insight into why his literacy (like his birthplace) may have been downplayed or kept a secret prior to the Thirteenth Amendment.

Deeds from 1879 indicate that Peter sold his house to one Lewis Moore, but he is still listed in the 1880 census. This census, the last one conducted during Peter Mott's lifetime, records him as a widowed plaster mason. He died the following year due to valvular heart disease. He was laid to rest in the "Snow Hill Church" (Mount Pisgah) Cemetery.

== The Underground Railroad ==
The Underground Railroad was a loosely connected system of volunteers who helped runaway slaves escape to freedom. It was largely undocumented, but strong oral history in the Black community provides evidence of its existence.

According to oral testimony and local circumstantial evidence, the Motts were involved in the Underground Railroad and used their home in Snow Hill as a station. For example, local resident Doris Scott remembered that her grandmother recounted a story of Peter Mott taking fugitive slaves in his wagon to Quakers in Haddonfield and Moorestown. The credibility of this story is supported by the fact that Miss Scott's grandmother was a neighbor of Mott and attended the same church, but it is also circumstantial because it cannot be proved outright. As with so much of the Underground Railroad, there is intentionally little evidence left behind. However, from Snow Hill, the freedom seekers would have had several possible avenues of escape, with routes leading to Pennsauken, Haddonfield, and Evesham.

== Preservation ==
The Peter Mott House is now the oldest standing residence in Lawnside, with current dimensions of approximately 15 by 40 feet (4.6 by 12.2 m). It is a compact rectangular wooden structure with two stories and a gable roof, constructed in two phases around 1845 and 1870. The older part (southern side) features a full basement supported by brick and stone masonry foundation walls, while the newer section (northern side) has a shallow crawl space and brick foundation that maintains the original design. Inside, the house's interior corresponds to the unassuming exterior.

Following neglect since the last occupant's passing in 1987, the house narrowly escaped demolition in 1992, when a Pennsylvanian developer purchased the land and received approval to construct 20 townhouses. Local residents united to form the Lawnside Historical Society, which commissioned a feasibility study to prevent the destruction. This ultimately led to the house's listing on National Register of Historic Places and the New Jersey Register of Historic Places. The house is now owned and operated by the Lawnside Historical Society, who converted it into a local museum. The Peter Mott House is recognized on a national level as a sanctuary for the Underground Railroad.

== Gallery ==
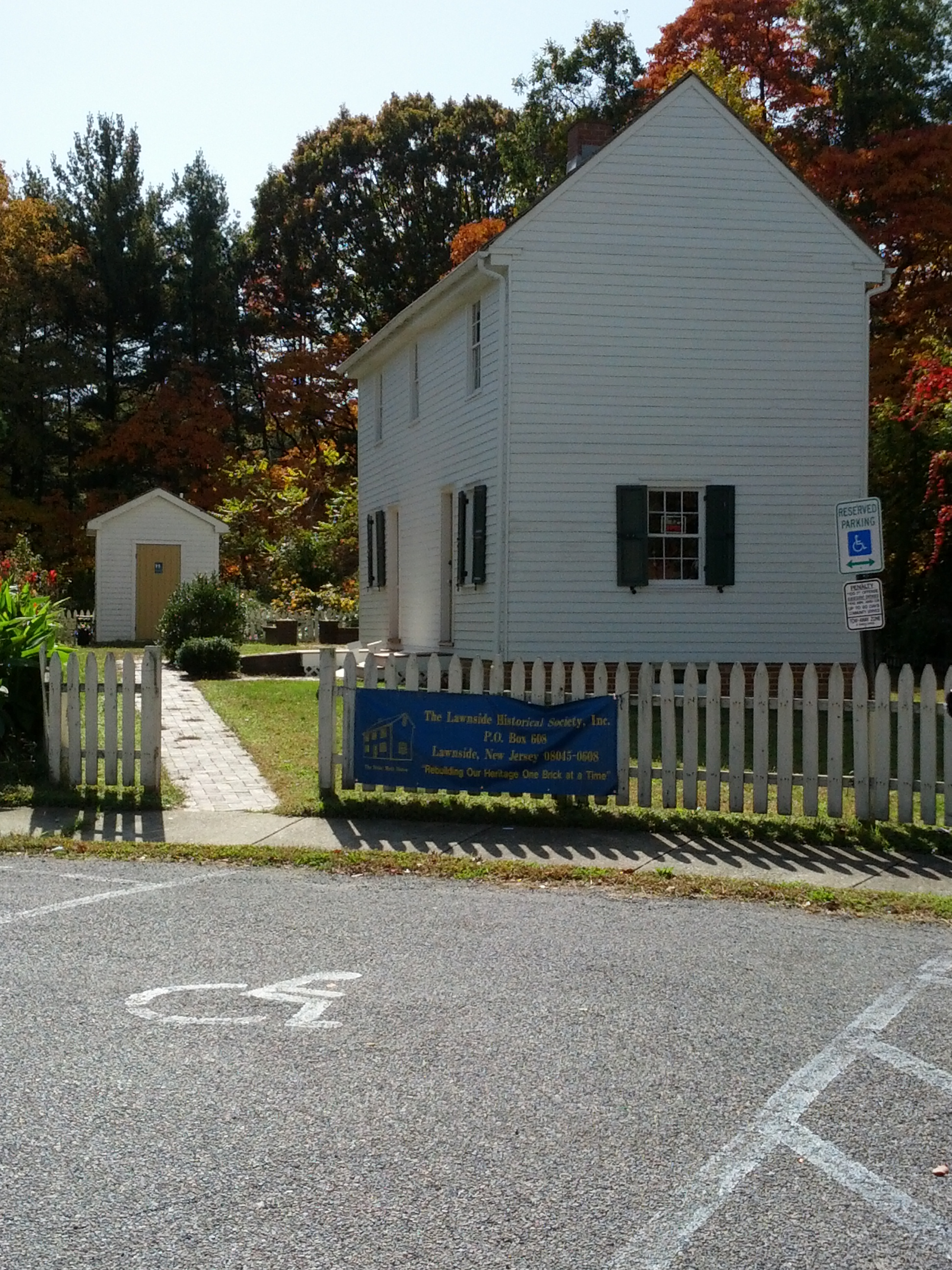
The Peter Mott House Facing Southwest

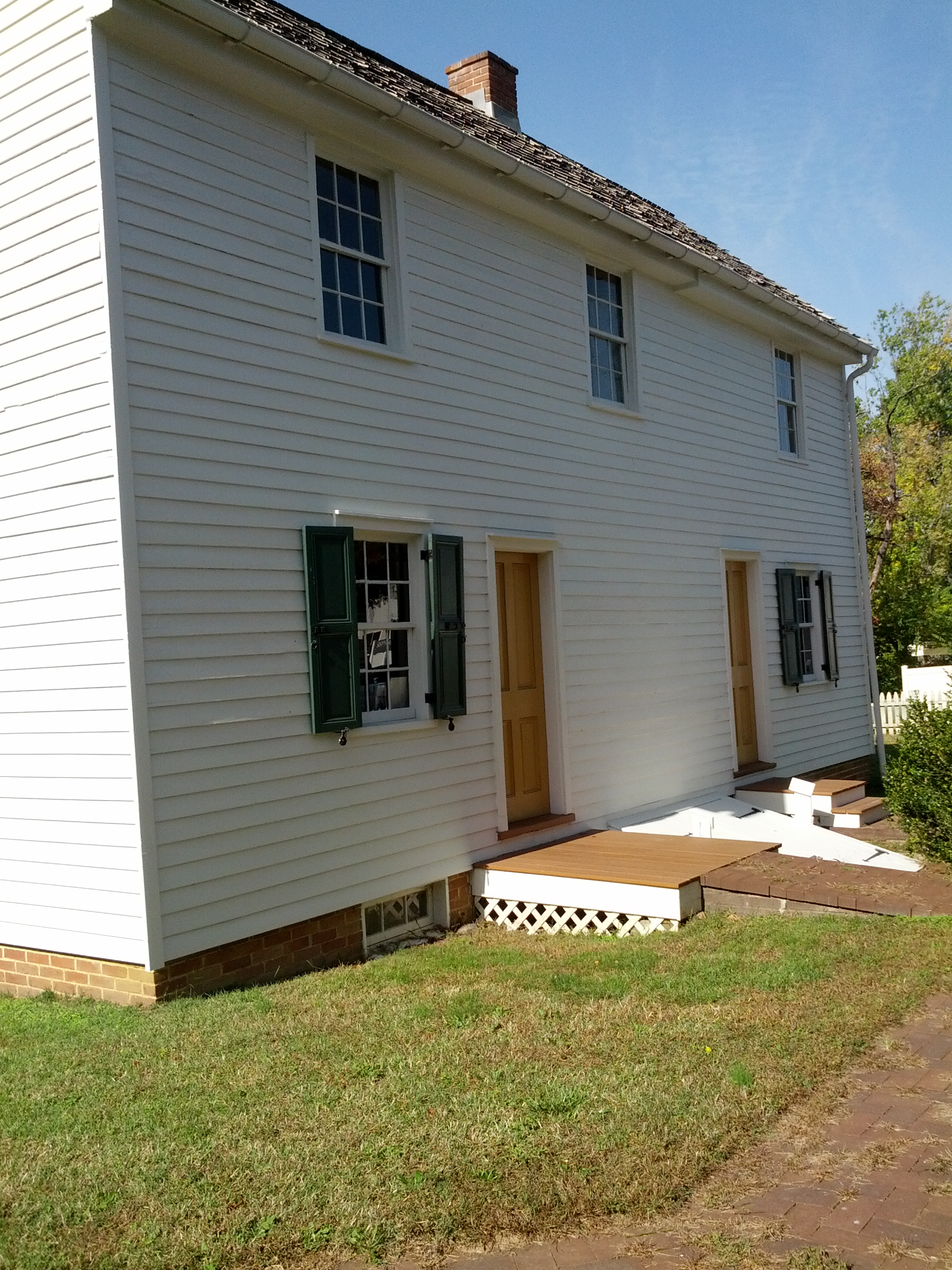
The Peter Mott House Facing Northwest
