= Sandfield Cemetery (Columbus, Mississippi) =

Cemetery in Lowndes County, Mississippi, US

Details
- Location: 100-198 South 25th Street; Columbus, Lowndes County, Mississippi
- Country: United States
- Coordinates: 33.49720°N 88.40360°W
- Type: Public and Private
- Size: roughly 14 acres
- No. of graves: approximately 250
- Find a Grave: Sandfield Cemetery

Sandfield Cemetery is a cemetery for African-Americans built in the late 19th-century in Columbus, Mississippi, United States.

== History ==
The Sandfield Cemetery was started in the late 19th-century (the exact date is unknown) and is thought to be the oldest African-American cemetery in the city of Columbus. Many 19th and early 20th century leaders in the local Black community are buried at this cemetery. The city has celebrated the Emancipation Day holiday at this location, to remember the cities African American leaders.

Local historian Chuck Yarborough, believes this cemetery may have been once called a "Potter's Field", and some of the former soldiers may have been re-interred at Corinth National Cemetery.

The historic portion of the cemetery is on roughly 10 acres and is owned by the city of Columbus, and there are 4 acres of connected cemetery that is privately owned (however as of 2022, the private owner is unknown). As a result of not knowing the land owner for the eastern portion, that section of cemetery has historically suffered from maintenance issues and local people have gotten involved in helping clean up.

Other local African American cemeteries nearby include Starkville Odd Fellows Cemetery, and Union Cemetery.

== Notable burials ==
- Jesse Freeman Boulden (1820–1899), Baptist minister, politician, editor
- Robert Gleed (1836–1916), Mississippi State Senator
- Richard D. Littlejohn (1855–1903), publisher and businessman
- Simon Mitchell, justice of the peace during the Reconstruction era
- William Isaac Mitchell (1855–1916), educator, first Black principal of Union Academy school, and president of the "Penny-Savings Bank"
- Jack Rabb (?–1882), businessman

== See also ==
- African Americans in Mississippi
- List of cemeteries in Mississippi
- Friendship Cemetery
