= Union Academy (Columbus, Mississippi) =

School for African Americans in Columbus, Mississippi

Coordinates: 33.5062°N 88.4183°W

Union Academy (c. 1865–1954), was a segregated public school for African American students in Columbus, Mississippi.

== History ==
A school for African Americans in Columbus opened in 1865 in a warehouse. The school became Union Academy and was run by Methodist missionaries. According to William Lowndes Lipscomb, editor of the Columbus Democrat, Union Academy was established as a "department" of Franklin Academy following an 1877 legislative bill introduced by J. E. Leigh.

The existing building was constructed in 1962 on the site of the school's 1903 building. Union Academy was the first public school for African Americans in Columbus and the only one until Mitchell Elementary was constructed in the 1920s. It served grades 1 to 6 before it closed in 2008.

Franklin Academy was the first public school in Columbus. Union Academy's teachers were run out of the area in 1877, as was done in other areas of Mississippi as the Reconstruction era ended and the Democrats restored white supremacy. Its first African American principal, William Isaac Mitchell, took over in 1878. He died in 1916 and is buried at Sandfield Cemetery.

A high school was added. The school reverted to an elementary school in 1954.

== Legacy ==
Community leader Pattee Bryant Miller graduated from the school.

The 396 page student register covering 1883 to 1903 is held by the Columbus-Lowndes Public Library. For Franklin Academy's 200th anniversary, and Union Academy's 155th anniversary in 2020, historic exhibits on the schools and celebrations of their history were organized.
