= General Randall =

General Randall may refer to:

- Carey A. Randall (1912–2008), U.S. Marine Corps major general
- George Morton Randall (1841–1918), U.S. Army major general

== See also ==
- Horace Randal (1833–1864), Confederate States Army brigadier general by appointment
- Alanson Merwin Randol (1837–1887), Union Army brevet brigadier general of volunteers
