= Jewish Cemetery (Port Gibson, Mississippi) =

Historic site in Claiborne County, Mississippi

- U.S. National Register of Historic Places
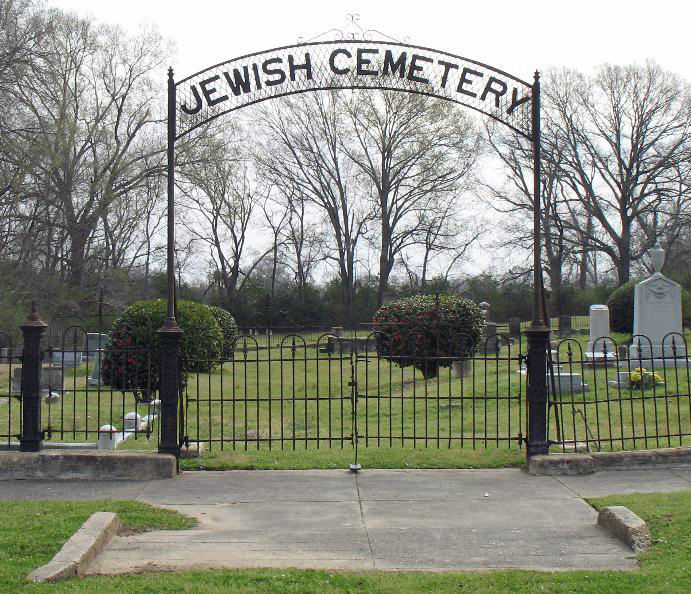

- Location within Mississippi
- Location: 900 Marginal St., Port Gibson, Mississippi
- Coordinates: 31°57′22″N 90°58′45″W
- Area: less than one acre
- MPS: Historic Cemeteries of Port Gibson TR
- NRHP reference No.: 79003415
- Added to NRHP: July 22, 1979

The Jewish Cemetery, also known as the Gemiluth Chassed Cemetery, is a historic Jewish cemetery in Port Gibson, Mississippi. The cemetery has been listed on the National Register of Historic Places since July 22, 1979.

== History ==
The cemetery was established in 1871 by Louis Kiefer, Mayer Bock, and Moses Kaufman. Members of the Jewish Cemetery of Port Gibson Association paid an annual fee of US$2.50. They subsequently established a trust fund held by the Southern Mississippi Bank of Port Gibson. It was restored in 1986.

Other Jewish cemeteries in Mississippi that are listed in the National Register include Beth Israel Cemetery in Meridian; and the Anshe Chesed Cemetery in Vicksburg. The Natchez City Cemetery includes Jewish Hill, a section dedicated to Jewish burials; and other Jewish cemeteries in Mississippi are the Beth Israel Cemetery in Jackson, and the Hebrew Union Cemetery in Greenville.
