= Lawnside, New Jersey =

Historically Black Community in Camden County, New Jersey

- Borough
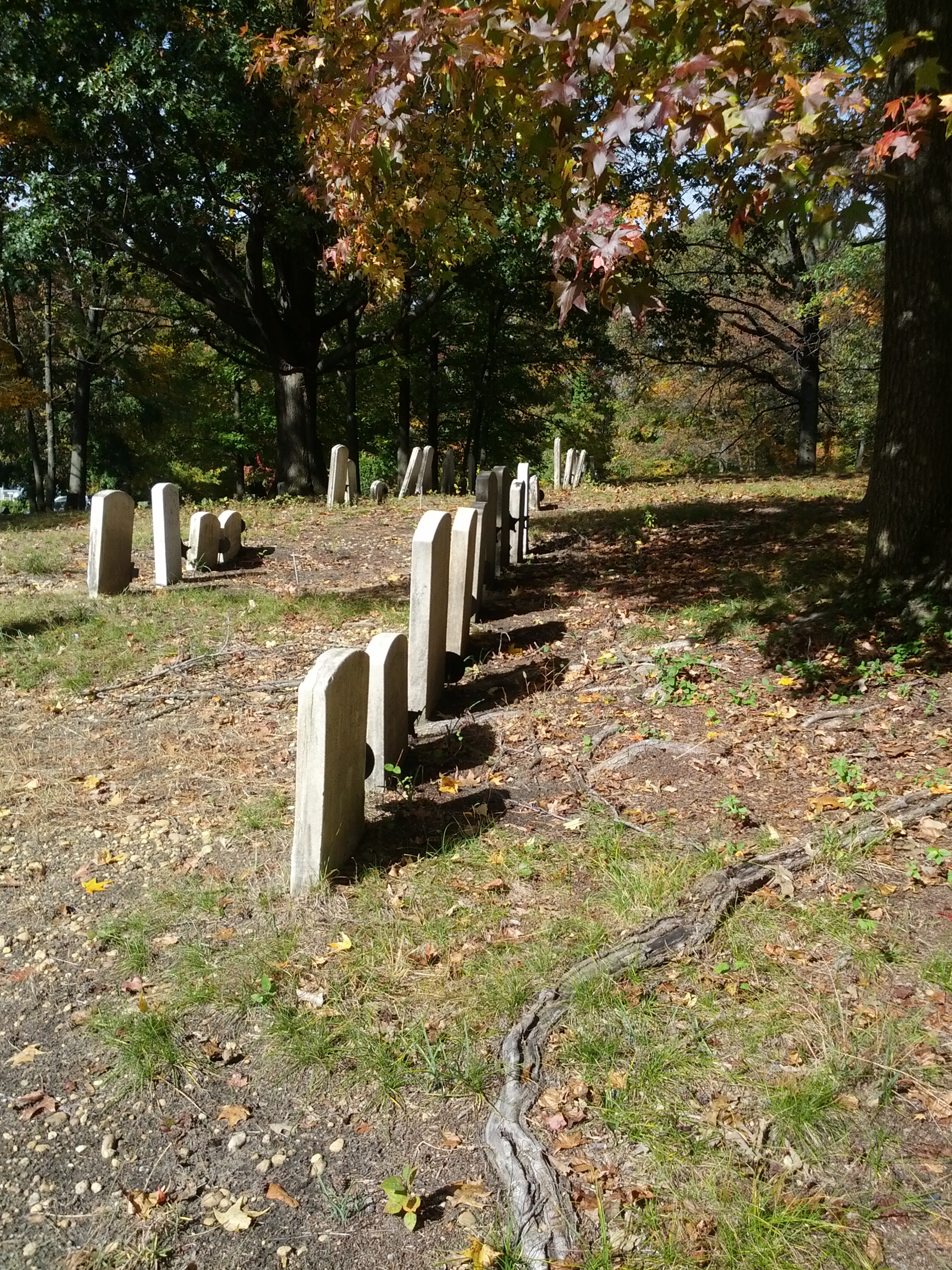
- Mount Peace Cemetery and Funeral Directing Company Cemetery

- Seal

- Location of Lawnside in Camden County highlighted in red (right). Inset map: Location of Camden County in New Jersey highlighted in orange (left).

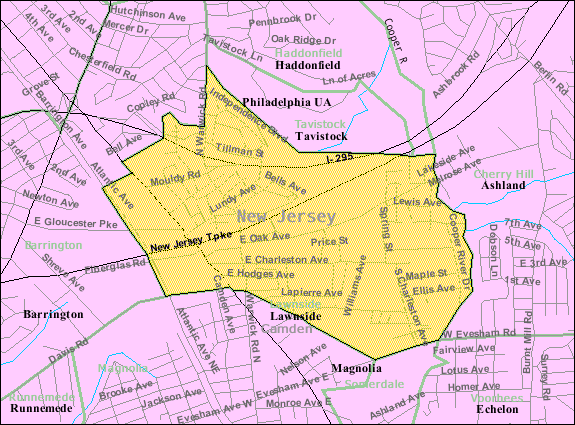
- Census Bureau map of Lawnside, New Jersey

- Location in Camden County Location in New Jersey Location in the United States
- Coordinates: 39.867308°N 75.028903°W
- Country: United States
- State: New Jersey
- County: Camden
- Incorporated: April 20, 1926

Government
  - Type: Borough
  - Body: Borough Council
  - Mayor: Mary Ann Wardlow (D, term ends December 31, 2026)
  - Administrator: Angelique Rankins
  - Municipal clerk: Marsharee Wright (acting)

Area
  - Total: 1.43 sq mi (3.70 km^{2})
  - Land: 1.43 sq mi (3.70 km^{2})
  - Water: 0 sq mi (0.00 km^{2}) 0.00%
  - Rank: 459th of 565 in state 25th of 37 in county
- Elevation: 85 ft (26 m)

Population (2020)
  - Total: 2,955
  - Estimate (2023): 3,301
  - Rank: 451st of 565 in state 28th of 37 in county
  - Density: 2,065.8/sq mi (797.6/km^{2})
  - Rank: 289th of 565 in state 30th of 37 in county
- Time zone: UTC−05:00 (Eastern (EST))
  - Summer (DST): UTC−04:00 (Eastern (EDT))
- ZIP Code: 08045
- Area code: 856 exchanges: 310, 546, 547, 573, 672
- FIPS code: 3400739420
- GNIS feature ID: 0885274
- Website: www.lawnside.net

Lawnside is a borough in Camden County, in the U.S. state of New Jersey. Lawnside was developed in 1840 and incorporated in 1926 as the first independent, self-governing Black municipality north of the Mason–Dixon line. As of the 2020 United States census, approximately 75% of the borough's 2,955 population still identified as Black or African American, although this percentage has declined over the past two census periods. The population in 2020 had increased by 10 (+0.3%) from the 2010 census count of 2,945,

== History ==
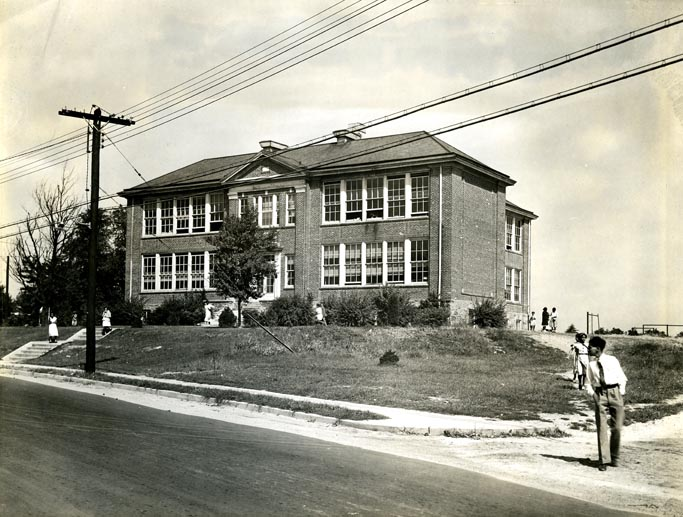
Lawnside school c. 1940

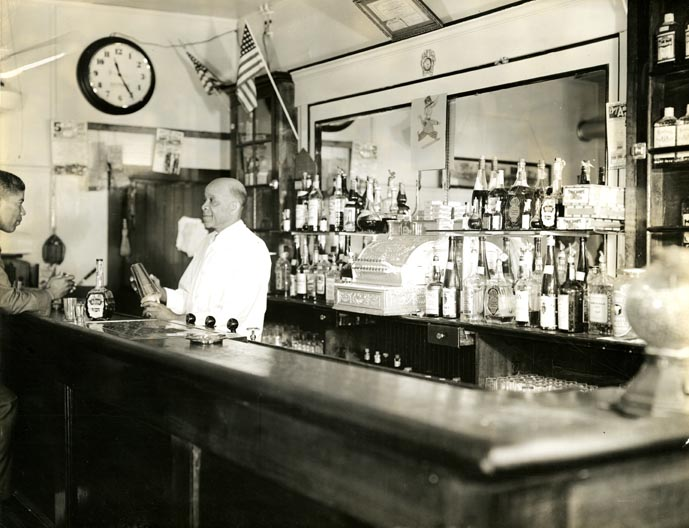
A tavern in Lawnside c. 1940

Lawnside has been home to African Americans since the late 18th century. Methodist gatherings were established by 1797, and in 1811, Bishop Richard Allen of Philadelphia founded the local African Methodist Episcopal Church (AME), which eventually became the Mount Pisgah AME Church today. AME churches were premised on abolition and civil rights, primarily serving former slaves and their descendants. Additionally, freedmen often sought safety and support by concentrating near Quaker allies, which in the case of Lawnside was the Haddonfield Quaker Society of Friends, with support from the Gloucester County Abolition Society and Vigilant Association of Philadelphia. In 1840, these latter abolitionists further advanced the settlement by purchasing land to convert into inexpensive lots for sale to African Americans. The original name of this community, Free Haven, was due to its crucial role as a stop (or even destination) along several routes of the Underground Railroad. Indeed, the home of Peter Mott, now a nationally recognized refuge of the underground railroad, was saved by the Lawnside Historical Society from demolition in 1992 specifically to preserve this important legacy of the town.

The early village was later known as "Snow Hill" after the Civil War and eventually "Lawnton." After a train station was constructed by Reading along the Atlantic City Railroad in 1907, the town became known as Lawnside, either from the presence of a spacious lawn at the station or as a shortened description of the stop's exit on the "Lawnton side" of the tracks.

In 1919, John Lawson, a prominent Philadelphian and recipient of the Medal of Honor for his service during the Civil War, was laid to rest at Mount Peace Cemetery in Lawnside. The exact reasons behind this location remain uncertain, with possibilities including family connections to Lawnside or the restrictions on burying black veterans in certain Pennsylvania cemeteries at the time.

On March 24, 1926, Governor of New Jersey A. Harry Moore signed into law New Jersey General Assembly Bill 561, dissolving Centre Township, of which Lawnside was a part, and incorporating the Borough of Lawnside, which also included portions of the borough of Barrington. One month later, on April 20, 1926, an "Official Special Election" was held making Lawnside the first independent, self-governing African American community north of the Mason–Dixon line.

Despite historic discrimination from banks against African Americans, the incorporation of the town as a Black community allowed residents to achieve home ownership with minimal bureaucratic obstacles. This was also facilitated by local mortgage lenders like the Home Mutual Investment Company, established in 1909, and the Lawnside Mutual Building and Loan Association in 1915.

Lawnside's existence and reputation as a distinctive community was supported in the 1930s through the presence of a thriving jazz and barbecue scene in the wake of prohibition, with venues named the Cotton Club, The Hi-Hat Club, Dreamland Café, and Club Harlem. These establishments attracted visitors from across the northeast, offering the opportunity to enjoy performances by influential African American artists and celebrities who were not allowed to play at white establishments, including such superstars as Sarah Vaughan, Ella Fitzgerald, Duke Ellington, Billie Holiday, LaWanda Page, Billy Eckstine, Arthur Prysock, and champion boxers Joe Louis and Jersey Joe Walcott.

During the 1960s, Lawnside's young people, influenced by the Civil rights and Black power movements, led sit-ins, protest marches and media campaigns against the discrimination they faced at the regional Haddon Heights High School, which resulted in changes in school administration, increased representation in student life, the introduction of Black studies courses, and the formation of the Afro-American Cultural Society. On April 9, 1968, Lawnside civic leaders became the first governmental entity in the United States to declare the birthday of Martin Luther King Jr. to be a holiday, just days after King's assassination.

== Geography ==
According to the United States Census Bureau, the borough had a total area of 1.43 square miles (3.70 km^{2}), all of which was land.

Lawnside borders the Camden County municipalities of Barrington, Cherry Hill, Haddonfield, Magnolia, Somerdale, Tavistock and Voorhees Township.

== Demographics ==
Historical population
Census	Pop.	Note	%±
1930	1,379		—
1940	1,270		−7.9%
1950	1,566		23.3%
1960	2,155		37.6%
1970	2,757		27.9%
1980	3,042		10.3%
1990	2,841		−6.6%
2000	2,692		−5.2%
2010	2,945		9.4%
2020	2,955		0.3%
2023 (est.)	3,301	▲	11.7%
Population sources:1930–2000 1930 1940–2000; 2000 2010

=== Racial and ethnic composition ===
Lawnside borough, Camden County, New Jersey – Racial and ethnic composition Note: the US Census treats Hispanic/Latino as an ethnic category. This table excludes Latinos from the racial categories and assigns them to a separate category. Hispanics/Latinos may be of any race.
Race / Ethnicity (NH = Non-Hispanic)	Pop 2000	Pop 2010	Pop 2020	% 2000	% 2010	% 2020
White alone (NH)	31	92	189	1.15%	3.12%	6.40%
Black or African American alone (NH)	2,498	2,572	2,216	92.79%	87.33%	74.99%
Native American or Alaska Native alone (NH)	25	15	0	0.93%	0.51%	0.00%
Asian alone (NH)	14	42	59	0.52%	1.43%	2.00%
Native Hawaiian or Pacific Islander alone (NH)	0	0	1	0.00%	0.00%	0.03%
Other race alone (NH)	7	12	18	0.26%	0.41%	0.61%
Mixed race or Multiracial (NH)	53	83	132	1.97%	2.82%	4.47%
Hispanic or Latino (any race)	64	129	340	2.38%	4.38%	11.51%
Total	2,692	2,945	2,955	100.00%	100.00%	100.00%

=== 2020 census ===
As of the 2020 census, Lawnside had a population of 2,955. The median age was 42.9 years. 20.0% of residents were under the age of 18 and 23.0% were 65 years of age or older. For every 100 females there were 84.2 males, and for every 100 females age 18 and over there were 79.4 males.

100.0% of residents lived in urban areas, while 0.0% lived in rural areas.

There were 1,148 households, of which 27.3% had children under the age of 18 living in them. Of all households, 33.0% were married-couple households, 16.9% had a male householder with no spouse or partner present, and 44.2% had a female householder with no spouse or partner present. About 31.8% of all households were made up of individuals and 17.4% had someone living alone who was 65 years of age or older.

There were 1,231 housing units, of which 6.7% were vacant. The homeowner vacancy rate was 1.2% and the rental vacancy rate was 6.8%.

=== 2010 census ===
The 2010 United States census counted 2,945 people, 1,103 households, and 762 families in the borough. The population density was 2,091.5 per square mile (807.5/km^{2}). There were 1,174 housing units at an average density of 833.7 per square mile (321.9/km^{2}). The racial makeup was 4.21% (124) White, 88.83% (2,616) Black or African American, 0.65% (19) Native American, 1.43% (42) Asian, 0.00% (0) Pacific Islander, 1.66% (49) from other races, and 3.23% (95) from two or more races. Hispanic or Latino of any race were 4.38% (129) of the population.

Of the 1,103 households, 25.7% had children under the age of 18; 37.4% were married couples living together; 24.5% had a female householder with no husband present and 30.9% were non-families. Of all households, 26.7% were made up of individuals and 11.5% had someone living alone who was 65 years of age or older. The average household size was 2.66 and the average family size was 3.23.

23.3% of the population were under the age of 18, 8.9% from 18 to 24, 22.3% from 25 to 44, 28.2% from 45 to 64, and 17.3% who were 65 years of age or older. The median age was 41.4 years. For every 100 females, the population had 84.4 males. For every 100 females ages 18 and older there were 78.1 males.

The Census Bureau's 2006–2010 American Community Survey showed that (in 2010 inflation-adjusted dollars) median household income was $56,006 (with a margin of error of +/− $5,232) and the median family income was $58,790 (+/− $6,229). Males had a median income of $46,705 (+/− $9,519) versus $43,239 (+/− $9,333) for females. The per capita income for the borough was $25,086 (+/− $3,210). About 12.3% of families and 12.7% of the population were below the poverty line, including 15.7% of those under age 18 and 10.1% of those age 65 or over.

=== 2000 census ===
As of the 2000 United States census there were 2,692 people, 1,026 households, and 700 families residing in the borough. The population density was 1,919.7 inhabitants per square mile (741.2/km^{2}). There were 1,110 housing units at an average density of 791.6 per square mile (305.6/km^{2}). The racial makeup of the borough was 93.61% African American, 1.75% White, 1.00% Native American, 0.52% Asian, 0.07% Pacific Islander, 0.48% from other races, and 2.56% from two or more races. Hispanic or Latino of any race were 2.38% of the population.

There were 1,026 households, out of which 23.5% had children under the age of 18 living with them, 40.1% were married couples living together, 22.4% had a female householder with no husband present, and 31.7% were non-families. 28.4% of all households were made up of individuals, and 14.6% had someone living alone who was 65 years of age or older. The average household size was 2.62 and the average family size was 3.23.

In the borough the population was spread out, with 23.3% under the age of 18, 7.4% from 18 to 24, 22.7% from 25 to 44, 27.8% from 45 to 64, and 18.8% who were 65 years of age or older. The median age was 42 years. For every 100 females, there were 83.4 males. For every 100 females age 18 and over, there were 77.4 males.

The median income for a household in the borough was $45,192, and the median income for a family was $55,197. Males had a median income of $34,881 versus $31,331 for females. The per capita income for the borough was $18,831. About 10.3% of families and 10.7% of the population were below the poverty line, including 16.0% of those under age 18 and 12.1% of those age 65 or over.

As part of the 2000 Census, 93.61% of Lawnside's residents identified themselves as being African American. This was the 30th highest percentage of African American people in any place in the United States with 1,000 or more residents identifying their ancestry and the highest in the Northeastern United States.

== Government ==
=== Local government ===
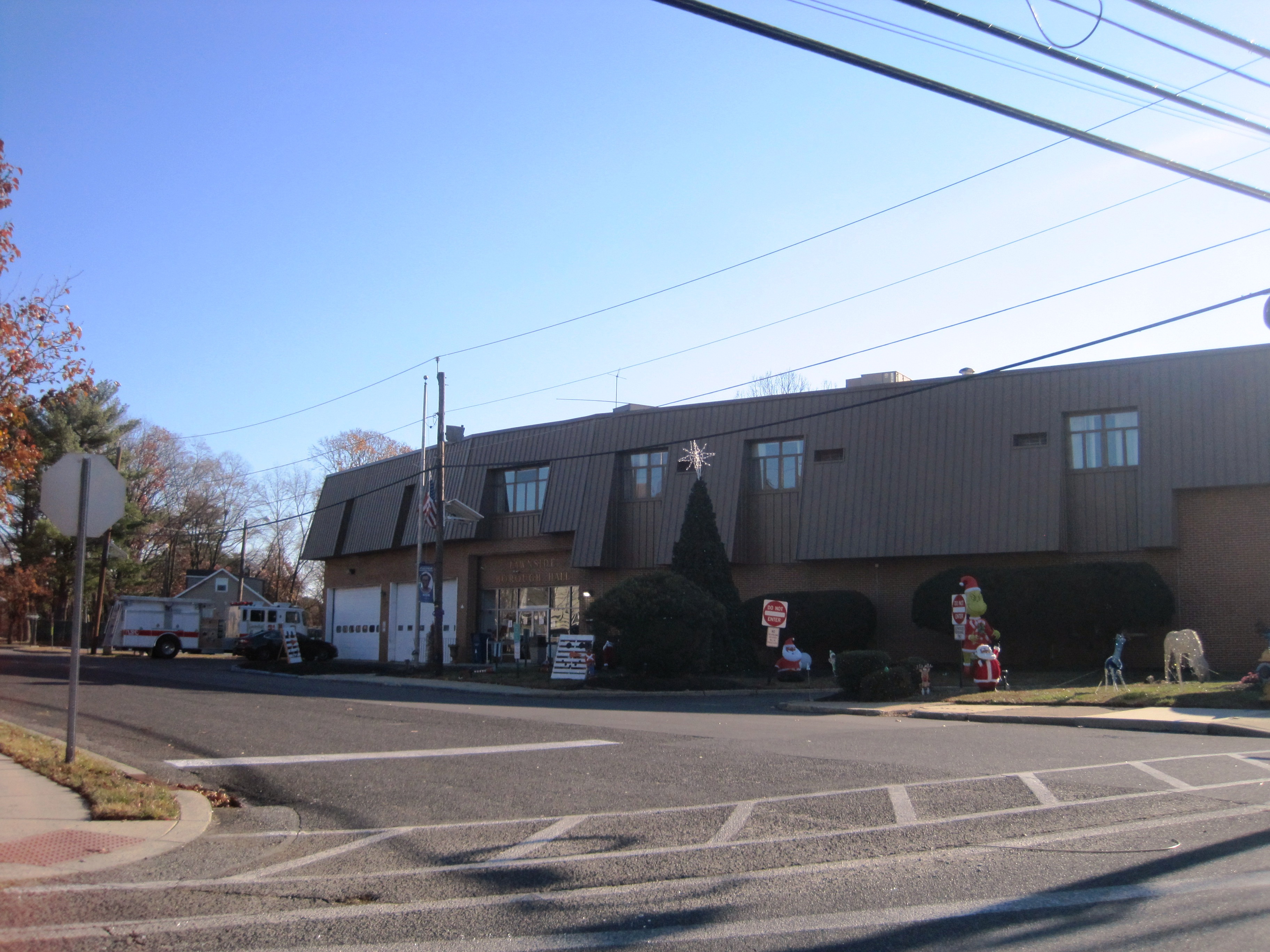
Lawnside Borough Hall

Lawnside is governed under the borough form of New Jersey municipal government, which is used in 218 municipalities (of the 564) statewide, making it the most common form of government in New Jersey. The governing body is comprised of a mayor and a borough council, with all positions elected at-large on a partisan basis as part of the November general election. A mayor is elected directly by the voters to a four-year term of office. The borough council includes six members elected to serve three-year terms on a staggered basis, with two seats coming up for election each year in a three-year cycle. The borough form of government used by Lawnside is a "weak mayor / strong council" government in which council members act as the legislative body with the mayor presiding at meetings and voting only in the event of a tie. The mayor can veto ordinances subject to an override by a two-thirds majority vote of the council. The mayor makes committee and liaison assignments for council members, and most appointments are made by the mayor with the advice and consent of the council.

As of 2023, the mayor of Lawnside Borough is Democrat Mary Ann Wardlow, whose term of office ends December 31, 2026. Members of the Lawnside Borough Council are Council President Steven T. Pollard (D, 2023), Ronald DeAbreu (D, 2024), Robert Lee (D, 2025), Rhonda Wardlow-Hurley (D, 2023), Eric J. Wilcox Sr. (D, 2023) and Dawn Wright-McLeod (D, 2024).

Eric Wilcox was appointed to fill the seat expiring in December 2020 that had been held by Clifford L. Still. In the November 2018 general election, Wilcox was elected to serve the balance of the term of office.

In 2021, the borough had the 25th-highest property tax rate in New Jersey, with an equalized rate of 4.213% in 2020, compared to 3.470% in the county as a whole and a statewide average of 2.279%.

=== Federal, state and county representation ===
Lawnside is located in the 1st congressional district and is part of New Jersey's 6th state legislative district.

For the 119th United States Congress, New Jersey's 1st congressional district is represented by Donald Norcross (D, Camden). New Jersey is represented in the United States Senate by Democrats Cory Booker (Newark, term ends 2027) and Andy Kim (Moorestown, term ends 2031).

For the 2026–2027 session, the 6th legislative district of the New Jersey Legislature is represented in the State Senate by James Beach (D, Voorhees Township) and in the General Assembly by Louis Greenwald (D, Voorhees Township) and Melinda Kane (D, Cherry Hill).

Camden County is governed by a Board of County Commissioners composed of seven members chosen at-large in partisan elections for three-year terms on a staggered basis by the residents of the county, with either two or three seats up for election each year as part of the November general election. At a reorganization meeting held in January after each election, the newly constituted Board of Commissioners selects one member to serve as Director and another as Deputy Director, each serving a one-year term in that role. As of 2025, Camden County's Commissioners are: Commissioner Director Louis Cappelli Jr. (D, Collingswood, 2026), Commissioner Deputy Director Edward T. McDonnell (D, Pennsauken Township, 2025), Virginia Ruiz Betteridge (D, Runnemede, 2025), Almar Dyer (D, Pennsauken Township, 2027), Melinda Kane (D, Cherry Hill, 2027), Jeffrey L. Nash (D, Winslow Township, 2027), and Jonathan L. Young Sr. (D, Berlin Township, 2026).

Camden County's constitutional officers are: Clerk Pamela Rosen Lampitt (D, Cherry Hill, 2029) Sheriff Chuck Billingham (D, Gloucester City, 2027) and Surrogate Michelle Gentek-Mayer (D, Gloucester Township, 2025).

=== Politics ===
As of March 2011, there were a total of 2,276 registered voters in Lawnside, of which 1,481 (65.1%) were registered as Democrats, 99 (4.3%) were registered as Republicans and 696 (30.6%) were registered as Unaffiliated. There were no voters registered to other parties.

Gubernatorial election results for Lawnside
Year	Republican		Democratic		Third party(ies)	
Year	No.	%	No.	%	No.	%
2025	55	4.26%	1,232	95.43%	4	0.31%
2021	56	5.54%	948	93.77%	7	0.69%
2017	26	2.77%	908	96.91%	3	0.32%
2013	146	17.28%	691	81.78%	8	0.95%
2009	59	5.33%	984	88.89%	64	5.78%
2005	62	6.74%	840	91.30%	18	1.96%

In the 2012 presidential election, Democrat Barack Obama received 97.9% of the vote (1,671 cast), ahead of Republican Mitt Romney with 2.0% (34 votes), and other candidates with 0.1% (2 votes), among the 1,722 ballots cast by the borough's 2,435 registered voters (15 ballots were spoiled), for a turnout of 70.7%. In the 2008 presidential election, Democrat Barack Obama received 96.2% of the vote (1,811 cast), ahead of Republican John McCain, who received around 1.9% (35 votes), with 1,882 ballots cast among the borough's 2,178 registered voters, for a turnout of 86.4%. In the 2004 presidential election, Democrat John Kerry received 92.6% of the vote (1,360 ballots cast), outpolling Republican George W. Bush, who received around 5.4% (79 votes), with 1,469 ballots cast among the borough's 1,989 registered voters, for a turnout percentage of 73.9.

United States presidential election results for Lawnside
Year	Republican		Democratic		Third party(ies)	
Year	No.	%	No.	%	No.	%
2024	132	8.54%	1,405	90.94%	8	0.52%
2020	78	4.57%	1,617	94.84%	10	0.59%
2016	38	2.50%	1,471	96.59%	14	0.92%
2012	34	1.99%	1,671	97.89%	2	0.12%
2008	35	1.86%	1,811	96.23%	36	1.91%
2004	79	5.38%	1,360	92.58%	30	2.04%

In the 2013 gubernatorial election, Democrat Barbara Buono received 81.8% of the vote (691 cast), ahead of Republican Chris Christie with 17.3% (146 votes), and other candidates with 0.9% (8 votes), among the 887 ballots cast by the borough's 2,423 registered voters (42 ballots were spoiled), for a turnout of 36.6%. In the 2009 gubernatorial election, Democrat Jon Corzine received 88.9% of the vote (984 ballots cast), ahead of both Republican Chris Christie with 5.3% (59 votes) and Independent Chris Daggett with 1.5% (17 votes), with 1,107 ballots cast among the borough's 2,332 registered voters, yielding a 47.5% turnout.

United States Senate election results for Lawnside1
Year	Republican		Democratic		Third party(ies)	
Year	No.	%	No.	%	No.	%
2024	104	6.93%	1,380	91.94%	17	1.13%
2018	58	4.28%	1,147	84.71%	149	11.00%
2012	26	1.60%	1,592	97.91%	8	0.49%
2006	130	13.51%	811	84.30%	21	2.18%

United States Senate election results for Lawnside2
Year	Republican		Democratic		Third party(ies)	
Year	No.	%	No.	%	No.	%
2020	70	4.07%	1,635	95.17%	13	0.76%
2014	25	2.47%	987	97.34%	2	0.20%
2013	4	0.50%	803	99.50%	0	0.00%
2008	63	3.85%	1,555	95.11%	17	1.04%

== Education ==
The Lawnside School District serves public school students in kindergarten through eighth grade at Lawnside Public School. As of the 2023–24 school year, the district, comprised of one school, had an enrollment of 347 students and 36.0 classroom teachers (on an FTE basis), for a student–teacher ratio of 9.6:1.

For ninth through twelfth grades, public school students attend Haddon Heights High School, which serves Haddon Heights, and students from the neighboring communities of Barrington, Lawnside and Merchantville, who attend the high school as part of sending/receiving relationships with the Haddon Heights School District. As of the 2023–24 school year, the high school had an enrollment of 942 students and 80.0 classroom teachers (on an FTE basis), for a student–teacher ratio of 11.8:1.

== Transportation ==
=== Roads and highways ===
As of May 2010, the borough had a total of 17.95 miles (28.89 km) of roadways, of which 10.75 miles (17.30 km) were maintained by the municipality, 3.89 miles (6.26 km) by Camden County, 1.90 miles (3.06 km) by the New Jersey Department of Transportation and 1.41 miles (2.27 km) by the New Jersey Turnpike Authority.

The New Jersey Turnpike is the most prominent highway passing through Lawnside. However, there are no exits within the borough, with the nearest ones being Exit 3 in Runnemede/Bellmawr and Exit 4 in Mount Laurel. Interstate 295 also passes through Lawnside, with one partial interchange at Warwick Road. U.S. Route 30 (White Horse Pike) runs through the borough. The United Parcel Service has a large depot in the borough.

In 2014, a longtime landmark on the White Horse Pike in Lawnside, a large white horse silhouette that stood in a parking lot for over 50 years, was dismantled due to concerns about its age and structural stability.

=== Public transportation ===
NJ Transit offers bus service between Turnersville and Camden, with connecting bus and rail service into Philadelphia on the 403 route.

== Notable people ==
People who were born in, residents of, or otherwise closely associated with Lawnside include:

- Horace J. Bryant (1909–1983), first African American to serve in a State Cabinet position in New Jersey
- Wayne R. Bryant (born 1947), member of the New Jersey General Assembly and State Senate until his conviction on corruption charges
- Ray Fisher (born 1988), actor best known for his performance as Cyborg in Batman v Superman: Dawn of Justice (2016)
- Ron Israel (born 1978), former professional football safety who played in the NFL for the Minnesota Vikings
- Steve Israel (born 1969), cornerback who played for 10 seasons in the NFL
- John Lawson (1837–1919), Medal of Honor recipient, is buried at Mount Peace in Lawnside
- Ryan Roberts (born 1980), former American football defensive end who played for the Notre Dame Fighting Irish football team
- Sherron Rolax, achieved public fame when his civil rights were allegedly violated by New Jersey governor Christine Todd Whitman in 1996 after police officers had stopped Rolax for suspicious activity in Camden, New Jersey
- William Still (1821–1902), abolitionist, member of the Pennsylvania Anti-Slavery Society and chairman of its Vigilance Committee, moved here with his family, together with his brothers Peter and James, and their families
