= John Lawson (Medal of Honor) =

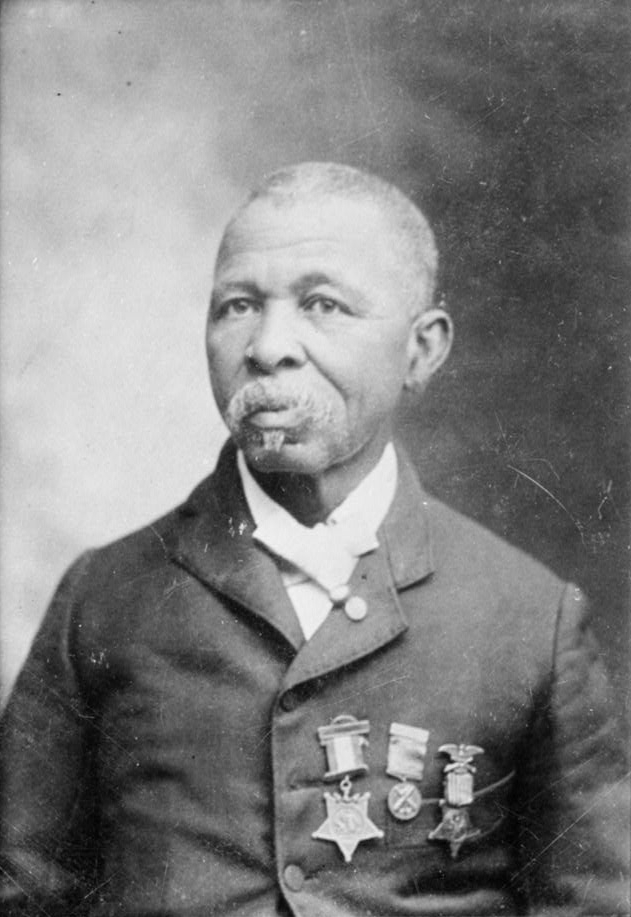
- John Lawson
- Born: June 16, 1837; Philadelphia, Pennsylvania
- Died: May 3, 1919 (aged 81); Philadelphia, Pennsylvania
- Burial place: Mount Peace Cemetery, Lawnside, New Jersey
- Military career
- Allegiance: United States of America; Union
- Branch: United States Navy; Union Navy
- Service years: 1863 - 1865
- Rank: Landsman
- Unit: (United States Navy) USS Hartford
- Conflicts: American Civil War; *Battle of Mobile Bay
- Awards: Medal of Honor

John Lawson (June 16, 1837 – May 3, 1919) was a United States Navy sailor who received the Medal of Honor for his actions during the American Civil War.

== Biography ==
John Lawson was born a free man on June 16, 1837. in Philadelphia, Pennsylvania. He enlisted the Navy in New York in December 1863. On August 5, 1864, during the Battle of Mobile Bay, while serving in a member of USS Hartford's berth deck ammunition party, he was seriously wounded after a shell had wounded him in the leg and killed or wounded the rest of his crew. Despite his wounds, he remained at his post and continued to supply the Hartford 's guns. John Lawson was one of twelve men who received the Medal of Honor for heroism that day.

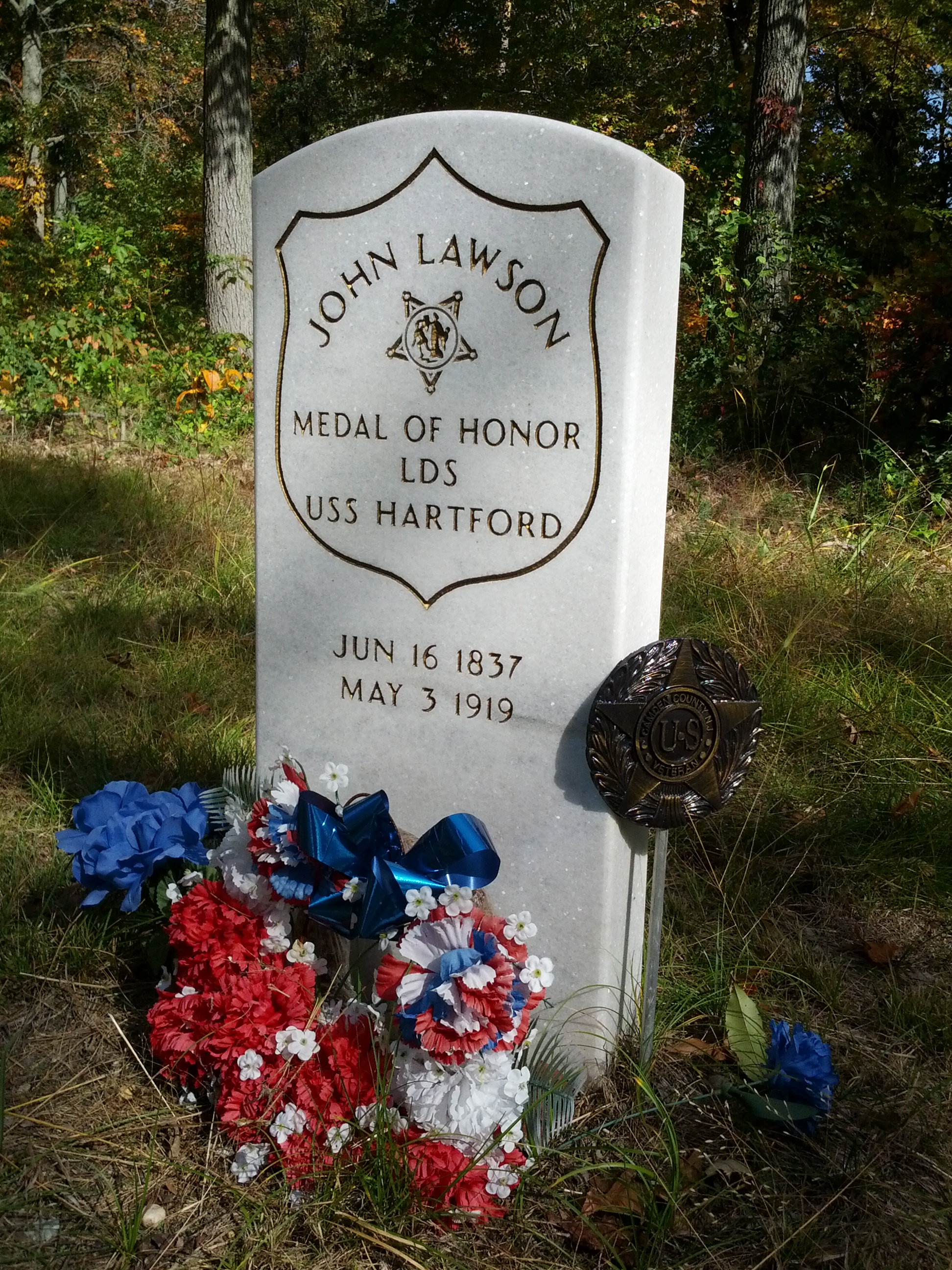
Tombstone of John Lawson

After leaving the navy in July 1865, he returned to the Philadelphia area, where he raised a large family and earned his living as a huckster. He died in Philadelphia on May 3, 1919, and was buried in Mount Peace Cemetery, Lawnside, New Jersey. He was 81.

Over time, the tombstone which marked his grave subsided, fell, or was worn to the point that it became unreadable; additionally a fire at the cemetery offices destroyed burial records and the cemetery map, and his exact resting place is not known. On April 24, 2004, a new tombstone was dedicated to John Lawson's honor and placed among at least 72 other Civil War veterans who are buried at Mount Peace. On April 24, 2004, the headstone was dedicated at a ceremony attended by veteran's groups, politicians, several of Lawson's descendants, and local community members.

== Medal of Honor citation ==
Rank and organization: Landsman, U.S. Navy. Born: 1837, Pennsylvania. Accredited to: Pennsylvania. G.O. No.: 45, December 31, 1864.

Citation:

On board the flagship U.S.S. Hartford during successful attacks against Fort Morgan, rebel gunboats and the ram Tennessee in Mobile Bay on 5 August 1864. Wounded in the leg and thrown violently against the side of the ship when an enemy shell killed or wounded the 6-man crew as the shell whipped on the berth deck, Lawson, upon regaining his composure, promptly returned to his station and, although urged to go below for treatment, steadfastly continued his duties throughout the remainder of the action.

== See also ==
- List of American Civil War Medal of Honor recipients: G–L
