= Robert Gleed =

Mississippi politician (1836-1916)

Robert Gleed, Sr.
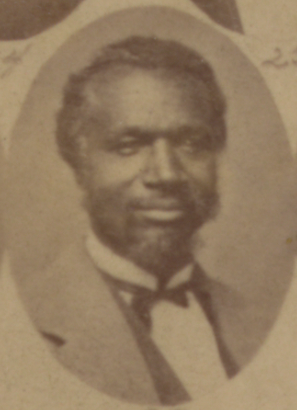

Senator
- In office 1870–1875

Personal details
- Born: c. 1836 Virginia, U.S.
- Died: July 24, 1916 (aged 79–80) Harris County, Texas, U.S.
- Resting place: Sandfield Cemetery
- Party: Republican
- Occupation: Politician, merchant

Robert Gleed Sr. (c. 1836 – July 24, 1916), was an American politician, merchant, and civic leader. He served as a Republican in the Mississippi State Senate during the Reconstruction era.

== Biography ==
Robert Gleed Sr. was born in about 1836 into slavery in Virginia. He had remained enslaved until the end of the American Civil War, around 1865; and he was arrested as a runaway slave in Columbus, Lowndes County, Mississippi in 1863.

Gleed was elected to Mississippi state legislature in either 1869, or 1870. In 1871, he testified for Congressional Investigators about the role of Southern newspapers, and the Ku Klux Klan in fomenting violence and resistance to Reconstruction-era efforts in Mississippi in the years after the American Civil War.

He resigned from the state senate in 1873 after violent white mobs lynched seven "recalcitrant blacks". He had four children. After several of his fellow African Americans were killed before an election in 1875, he relocated to Paris, Texas. He later returned to Columbus, Mississippi, but fled again after white mobs threatened him.

He campaigned for sheriff in Lowndes County in 1875. He met with leading Democratic Party representatives and attempted to appease them before the election. He was unsuccessful, and his home was attacked and burned as well as some of his neighbors' homes.

He died on July 24, 1916, in Harris County, Texas. Gleed is buried at Sandfield Cemetery in Columbus, Mississippi.
