= Odd Fellows and Confederate Cemetery =

Historic cemetery in Grenada County, Mississippi, US

- U.S. National Register of Historic Places
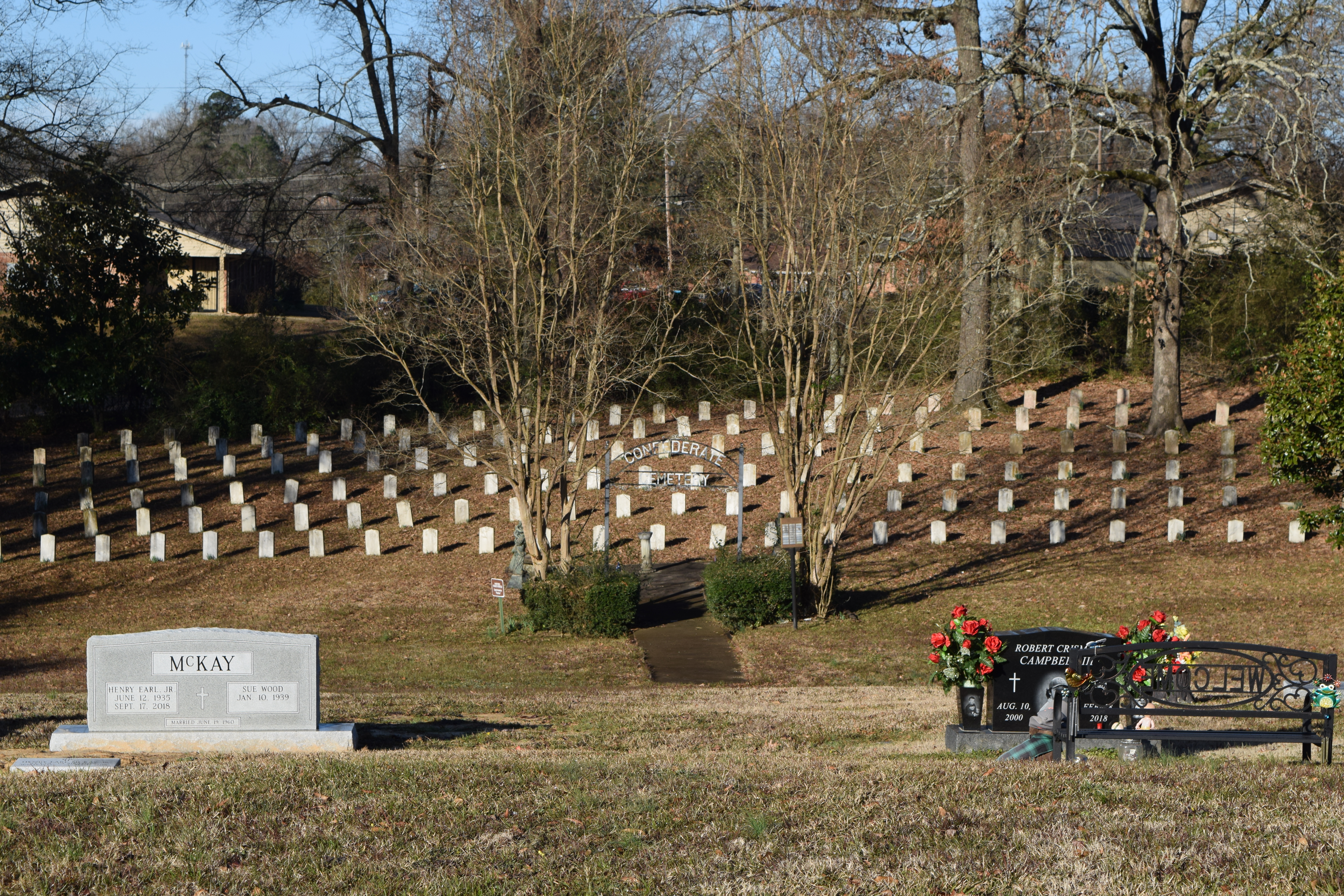
- Confederate Cemetery in 2019

- Location within Mississippi Location within the United States
- Location: Corner of Cemetery and Commerce Sts., Grenada, Mississippi
- Coordinates: 33°46′29″N 89°48′39″W
- Area: 8.5 acres (3.4 ha)
- Architectural style: Gothic;Romanesque;Classical
- MPS: Grenada MRA
- NRHP reference No.: 87002341
- Added to NRHP: January 20, 1988

The Odd Fellows and Confederate Cemetery, located at the corner of Cemetery and Commerce Streets in Grenada, Mississippi, is a historic cemetery. It includes Gothic architecture, Romanesque architecture, Classical architecture. It was listed on the National Register of Historic Places in 1988 for its architectural criteria.

The Confederate section contains about 150 graves of Confederate soldiers who died in the Grenada area.

The cemeteries may contain burials from several specific calamities. Grenada suffered a tornado on May 7, 1846, which destroyed 112 houses and killed 21 persons. It also suffered a fire in 1855 which burned about half of the town's buildings. Soon after the fall of Vicksburg, Grenada was the site of a Union cavalry raid on August 18 and 19, 1863, which overwhelmed a token defensive force and destroyed the town's railway depot, railyard buildings, eighty locomotives and 200 freight cars.

The cemetery may also include burials of victims of a devastating Yellow Fever epidemic in 1878, which killed at least 363 individuals—including the mayor—in a town of about 2,000 residents.

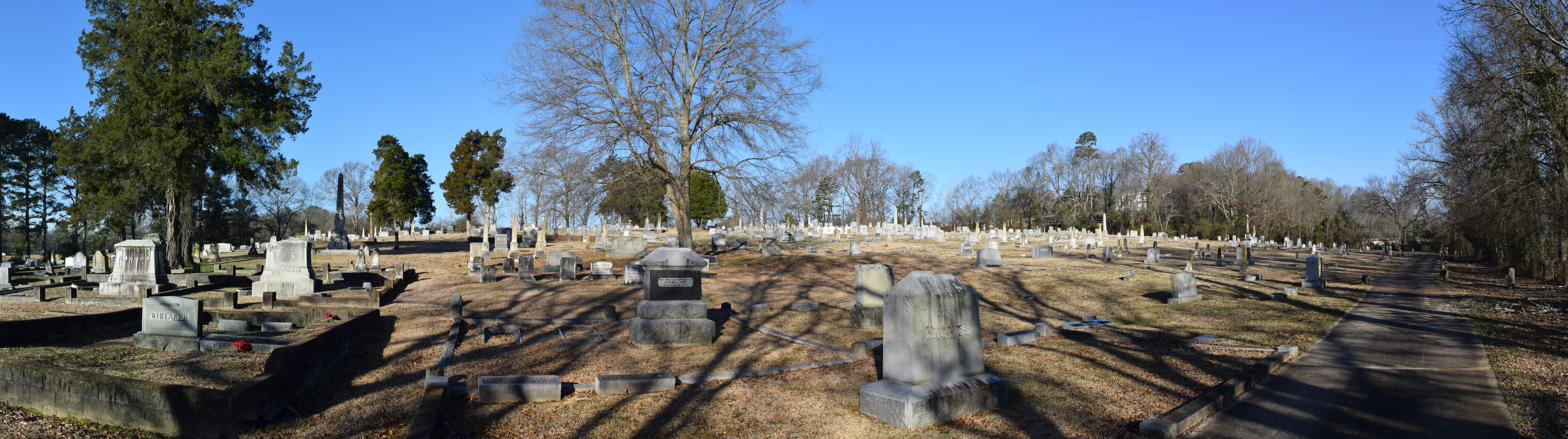
Odd Fellows Cemetery
