= Natchez National Cemetery =

Historic veterans cemetery in Adams County, Mississippi

- U.S. National Register of Historic Places
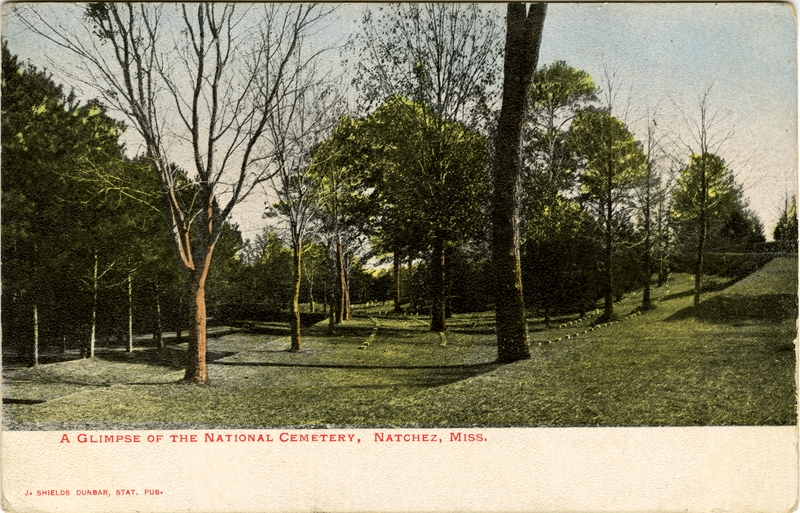
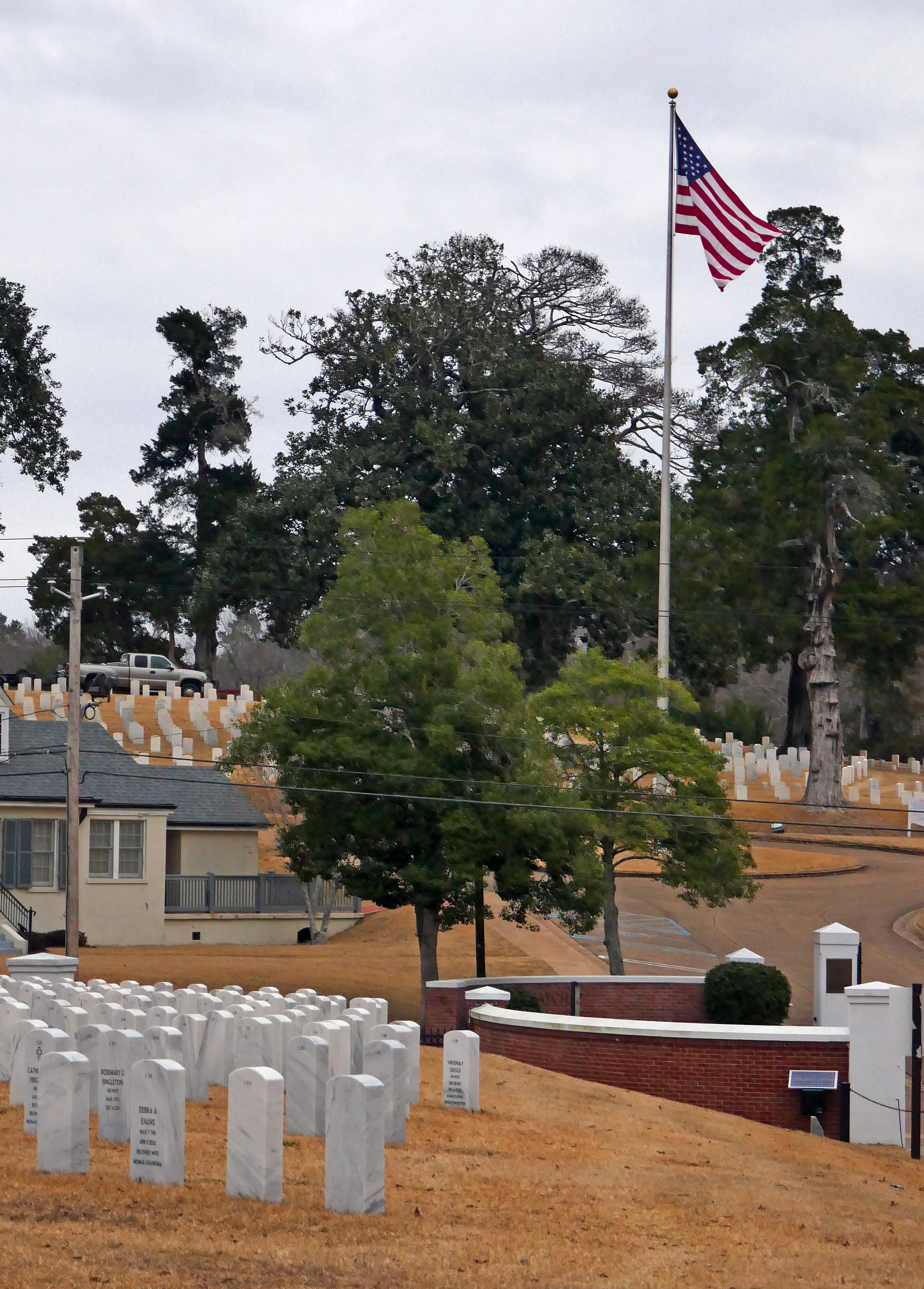
- Postcard of Natchez National Cemetery Natchez National Cemetery

- Location within Mississippi Location within the United States
- Location: 41 Cemetery Rd., Natchez, Mississippi
- Coordinates: 31°34′51″N 91°23′42″W
- Built: 1866
- Architectural style: Colonial Revival
- MPS: Civil War Era National Cemeteries MPS
- NRHP reference No.: 99001387
- Added to NRHP: November 22, 1999

Natchez National Cemetery is a United States National Cemetery located in the city of Natchez overlooking the Mississippi River in Adams County, Mississippi. Administered by the United States Department of Veterans Affairs, it encompasses 25.7 acres (10.4 ha), and as of the end of 2005, had 7,154 interments.

== History ==
The original site of the cemetery was purchased from local residents in 1866, to inter Union soldiers who died in the Civil War. Remains from battlefield and post cemeteries from around the region were brought to the cemetery to be reinterred. In 1866 a large number of soldiers who were buried in the levees of the west bank of the Mississippi River were exhumed and transferred to the National Cemetery.

Natchez National Cemetery was listed in the National Register of Historic Places in 1999.

== Notable interments ==
- Landsman Wilson Brown, Medal of Honor recipient for action aboard USS Hartford at the Battle of Mobile Bay during the Civil War.
- Major General Carey A. Randall, decorated officer in the Marine Corps; served as Military Assistant to the Secretary of Defense from 1951–1960.

== See also ==
- Natchez City Cemetery
