= Natchez City Cemetery =

Historic burial ground, Mississippi

Coordinates: 31.575°N 91.394°W

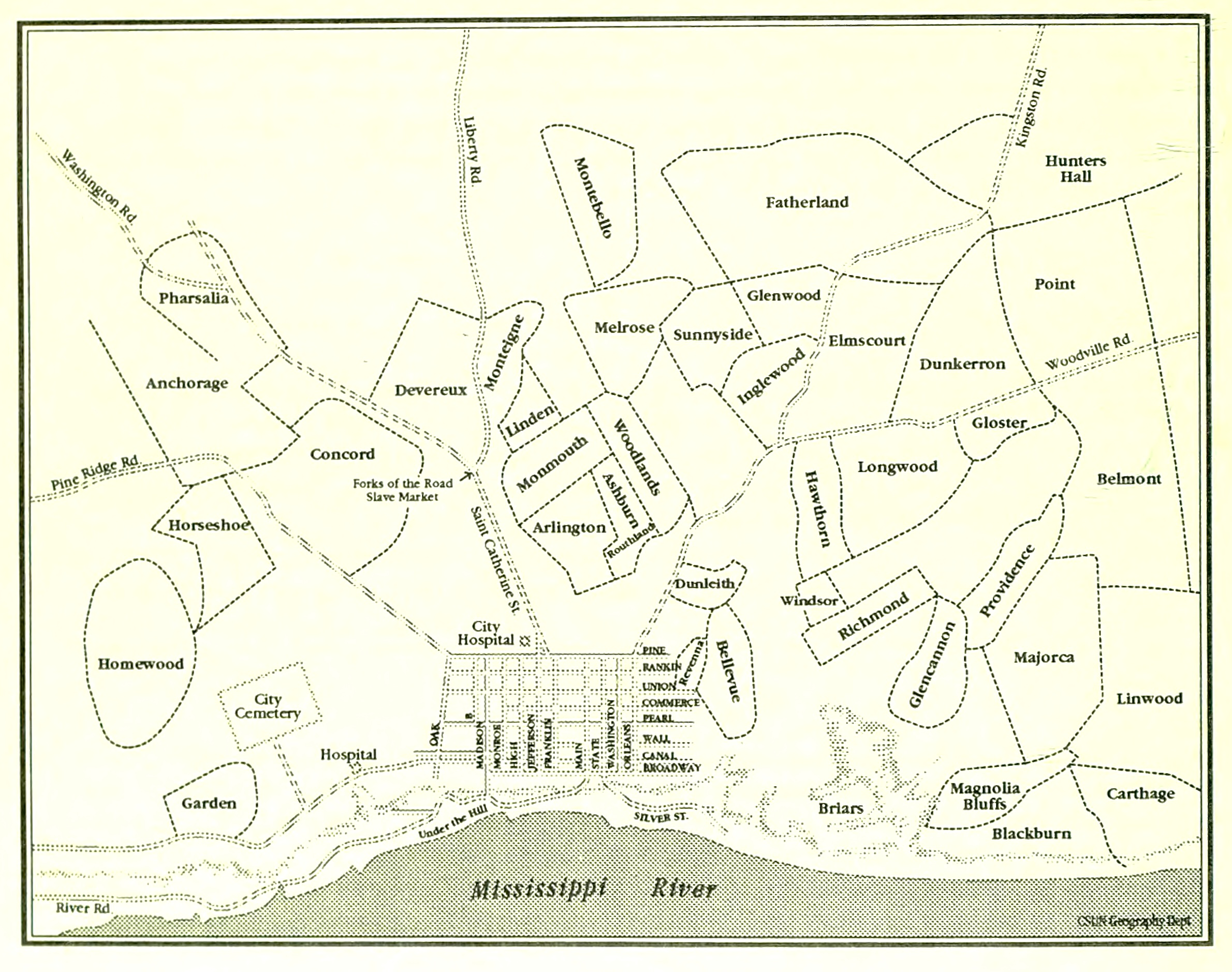
Map of Natchez historic sites showing cemetery bottom left (National Park Service)

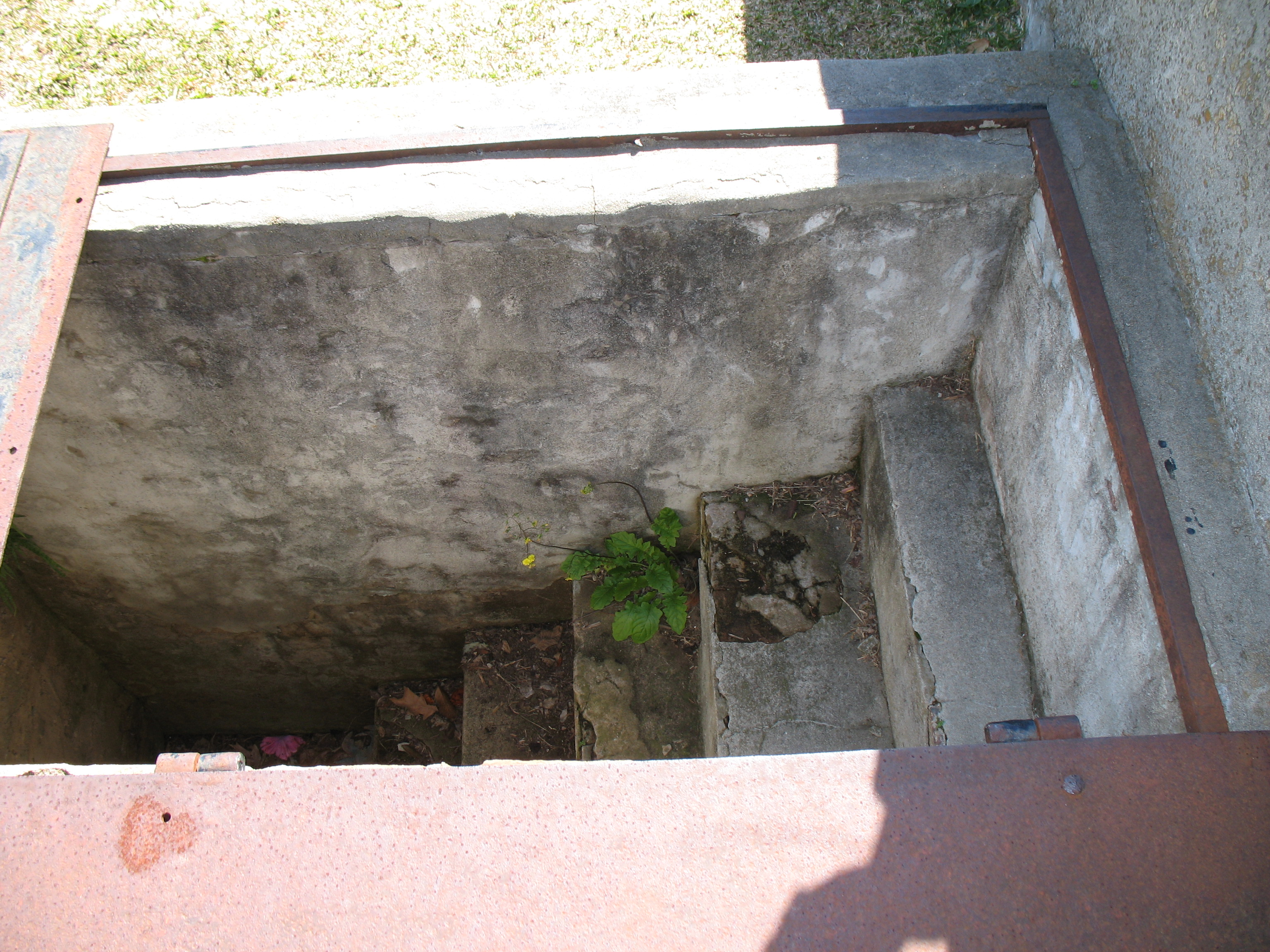
Stairs to the grave of Florence Irene Ford

Natchez City Cemetery is a historically significant burial ground located at 2 Cemetery Road, Natchez, Mississippi, United States.

== Monuments ==
Among notable monuments is the "turning angel" statue on a memorial to the five young female victims of an industrial explosion at the Natchez Drug Company in 1908. Natchez native Greg Iles wrote a novel entitled Turning Angel. Notable burials include Spanish colonial administrator Don José Vidal (namesake of Vidalia), American politician John A. Quitman, steamboat man Thomas Paul Leathers, American Civil War casualty Rosalie Beekman, Confederate militia general Charles Dahlgren, city clerk Louis Winston, brick mason Clarence Aloysius Webb, and woman of wealth Katherine Lintot Minor, "the Yellow Duchess".

Little is known about the woman buried under the marker for "Louise the Unfortunate," but she was most likely a prostitute who declined to ever disclose her legal name. Stairs lead down to a viewing spot where the mother of 10-year-old yellow fever victim Florence Irene Ford used to come and visit with her buried daughter. Rufus Case is buried in a "squat pyramid—per his instructions, he was buried upright in a rocking chair."

== History ==
The city of Natchez bought the land from John Steel (or John Steele) for $1,000 in 1821. The cemetery opened in 1822, when remains from an earlier cemetery located in what is now Memorial Park adjacent to St. Mary's Basilica were reinterred on the bluff overlooking the Mississippi River. The land was initially subdivided into four sections, assigned to Roman Catholics, strangers, people of color, and "white people in general."

The cemetery has 10,000 marked graves and many others unrecorded. Natchez City Cemetery is listed on the National Register of Historic Places as part of the Cemetery Bluff District.

== See also ==
- Natchez National Cemetery
- List of cemeteries in Mississippi

== Sources ==
- Brown, Alan (2010). Haunted Natchez. Haunted America. Charleston, South Carolina: Arcadia Publishing. ISBN 978-1-61423-600-9. LCCN 2010028289. OCLC 1545564837.
