= List of shipwrecks in May 1840 =

The list of shipwrecks in May 1840 includes ships sunk, foundered, wrecked, grounded, or otherwise lost during May 1840.

== 1 May ==
List of shipwrecks: 1 May 1840
Ship	State	Description
Adrastus	United Kingdom	The ship was driven ashore in the Hooghly River at Calcutta, India. She was later refloated.
Allerton	United Kingdom	The ship was driven ashore in the Hooghly River at Calcutta. She was later refloated.
Brilliant	United Kingdom	The ship was driven ashore in the Hooghly River at Calcutta.
Cheviot	United Kingdom	The ship was wrecked near Cape Race, Newfoundland, British North America. All on board were rescued. She was on a voyage from Milford Haven, Pembrokeshire to Quebec City, Lower Canada, British North America.
Clown	United Kingdom	The ship was driven ashore in the Hooghly River at Calcutta. She was later refloated.
Coringa Packet	United Kingdom	The ship was driven ashore in the Hooghly River at Calcutta. She was later refloated.
Elizabeth	United Kingdom	The ship was driven ashore in the Hooghly River at Calcutta. She was later refloated.
Look-in	(United Kingdom of Great Britain and Ireland) New South Wales	The ship ran aground in the Western Channel. She was on a voyage from Launceston, Van Diemen's Land to Sydney.
Lucy	United Kingdom	The ship was driven ashore in the Hooghly River at Calcutta. She was later refloated.
Mariam	United Kingdom	The ship was driven ashore in the Hooghly River at Calcutta. She was later refloated.
Shepherdess	United Kingdom	The ship was driven ashore in the Hooghly River at Calcutta. She was later refloated.
Superbe	United Kingdom	The ship was driven ashore in the Hooghly River at Calcutta. She was later refloated.
William	United Kingdom	The ship was driven ashore in the Hooghly River at Calcutta. She was later refloated.
William Gales	United Kingdom	The ship was driven ashore in the Hooghly River at Calcutta. She was later refloated.
Wilson	United Kingdom	The ship was driven ashore in the Hooghly River at Calcutta. She was later refloated.

== 2 May ==
List of shipwrecks: 2 May 1840
Ship	State	Description
Curlew	United Kingdom	The schooner capsized at Spalding, Lincolnshire.
Emelie Frederike	Danzig	The ship was driven ashore at Danzig. She was on a voyage from Danzig to London, United Kingdom. She was refloated on 30 May and taken into Danzig.
Hannah	United Kingdom	The ship ran aground off Skagen, Denmark. She was on a voyage from Memel, Prussia to Grangemouth, Stirlingshire. Hannah was refloated and taken into Aalborg.
Robert Raikes	United Kingdom	The ship ran aground and was wrecked at Memel, Prussia. She was on a voyage from Sunderland, County Durham to Memel. Robert Raikes was refloated on 10 May and beached.

== 3 May ==
List of shipwrecks: 3 May 1840
Ship	State	Description
Devon	United Kingdom	The ship was wrecked on the Nore. Her crew were rescued.
Hannah	United Kingdom	The ship ran aground off Skagen, Denmark. she was on a voyage from Memel, Prussia to Grangemouth, Stirlingshire. Hanna was refloated and put into Frederikshavn, Denmark for repairs.

== 4 May ==
List of shipwrecks: 4 May 1840
Ship	State	Description
Eliza Welld	Trieste	The ship ran aground on the Grain Spit and was damaged. She was on a voyage from Trieste to London, United Kingdom. Eliza Welld was refloated and taken into Sheerness, Kent, United Kingdom for repairs.
Jeanette	(United Kingdom of Great Britain and Ireland) British North America	The ship was driven ashore on "Tuskar Island". Her crew were rescued. She was on a voyage from Boston, Massachusetts, United States to Rotterdam, South Holland, Netherlands.
Perseverance	United Kingdom	The whaler was lost off the coast of Greenland. Her crew were rescued.

== 5 May ==
List of shipwrecks: 5 May 1840
Ship	State	Description
Albion	United Kingdom	The ship foundered in the Atlantic Ocean. Her crew were rescued. She was on a voyage from London to Quebec City, Lower Canada, British North America.
Atlantic	United Kingdom	The barque was wrecked at Pacha Cove Newfoundland, British North America with the loss of one life. She was on a voyage from Dundee, Forfarshire to Quebec City.
Chase	United Kingdom	The ship was driven ashore and wrecked near Stolp. She was on a voyage from Sunderland, County Durham to Danzig.
John Dunscombe	(United Kingdom of Great Britain and Ireland) New Zealand	The schooner broke her moorings and was driven on shore at Kapiti Island, New Zealand. There were no deaths.

== 6 May ==
List of shipwrecks: 6 May 1840
Ship	State	Description
Cybele	United Kingdom	The ship was driven ashore in the Demerara River.
Thomas	United Kingdom	The ship ran aground at Dundee, Forfarshire and was wrecked. She was on a voyage from Newcastle upon Tyne, Northumberland to Dundee.

== 7 May ==
List of shipwrecks: 7 May 1840
Ship	State	Description
Competent	United Kingdom	The ship was wrecked at Bombay, India. She was on a voyage from Liverpool, Lancashire to Bombay.
General Lawrence	United States	Great Natchez Tornado: The steamboat sank in the Mississippi River at Natchez, Mississippi with the loss of all on board.
Hinds	United States	Great Natchez Tornado: The steamboat was struck by a tornado at Natchez and deposited at Baton Rouge, Louisiana with the loss of 51 lives.
Jessie	United Kingdom	The ship was driven ashore at Drogheda, County Louth. She was on a voyage from Dublin to Troon, Ayrshire. She was refloated on 3 June and taken into Drogheda.
Prairie	United States	Great Natchez Tornado: The steamboat was wrecked at Natchez.
St. Lawrence	United States	Great Natchez Tornado: The steamboat was wrecked at Natchez.

== 8 May ==
List of shipwrecks: 8 May 1840
Ship	State	Description
Goed Besluit	Netherlands	The ship sprang a leak and was beached at Brielle, South Holland. She was on a voyage from Hellevoetsluis, Zeeland to Saint Petersburg, Russia.
Ranger	United Kingdom	The ship was driven ashore at Shakespeare's Cliff, Dover, Kent. She was on a voyage from Cardiff, Glamorgan to a Scottish port. Ranger was refloated and resumed her voyage.

== 9 May ==
List of shipwrecks: 9 May 1840
Ship	State	Description
Dove	United Kingdom	The ship was driven ashore at Mauritius.
Eliza	United Kingdom	The galiot was driven ashore and wrecked in Glenarm Bay. Her crew were rescued. She was on a voyage from Glasgow, Renfrewshire to Belfast, County Antrim.
Euxine	United States	The ship was driven ashore and wrecked on Dauphin Island, Alabama. She was on a voyage from the Clyde to Mobile, Alabama.
Inca	United Kingdom	The ship struck the Blackwater Bank, in the Irish Sea and was damaged. She was abandoned 20 nautical miles (37 km) off Cork the next day. Her crew survived. She was on a voyage from Liverpool, Lancashire to Port Phillip and Sydney, New South Wales.
Industry	United Kingdom	The sloop was driven ashore and wrecked in Glenarm Bay. Her crew were rescued.
Lively	United Kingdom	The ship was run down and sunk in the Irish Sea 22 nautical miles (41 km) south of the Calf of Man, Isle of Man. Her crew were rescued. She was on a voyage from Coleraine, County Antrim to Liverpool, Lancashire.
Patriot	United Kingdom	The barque was wrecked at Mauritius. She was on a voyage from Singapore to Mauritius.
Recovery	United Kingdom	The ship ran aground on the Newcombe Sand, in the North Sea off the coast of Suffolk. She was on a voyage from Newcastle upon Tyne, Northumberland to London. Recovery was refloated and resumed her voyage.
Stratford	United Kingdom	The barque was driven ashore at Mauritius.
Vulture	United Kingdom	The steamship was driven ashore at Kuressaare, Russia. She was on a voyage from London to Saint Petersburg, Russia.
Wilsons	United Kingdom	The ship ran aground on the Long Sand, in the North Sea off the coast of Essex and was abandoned by all but her captain and mate. She was refloated with assistance from HMS Boxer (Royal Navy) and towed into Ramsgate, Kent, where she arrived on 10 May. Wilsons was on a voyage from Livorno, Grand Duchy of Tuscany to Saint Petersburg.

== 10 May ==
List of shipwrecks: 10 May 1840
Ship	State	Description
Arcturus	United Kingdom	The barque was driven ashore and wrecked at Coatham, Yorkshire. All seventeen people on board were rescued. She was on a voyage from Sierra Leone to Sunderland, County Durham.
Clementice	United Kingdom	The ship was wrecked off Bray, County Wicklow. Her crew were rescued.
Dorothy	United Kingdom	The ship ran aground on the Herd Sand, in the North Sea off the coast of County Durham. She was refloated on 13 May.
Good Hope	United Kingdom	The ship was wrecked near Huntcliffe, County Durham. Her crew were rescued. She was on a voyage from King's Lynn, Norfolk to Newcastle upon Tyne, Northumberland.
Good Intent	United Kingdom	The ship was driven ashore near Rawcliffe, Yorkshire. Her crew were rescued by the Redcar Lifeboat. She was on a voyage from King's Lynn to Newcastle upon Tyne.
Lily	United Kingdom	The ship was driven ashore and wrecked near Scarborough, Yorkshire.
Millicent	United Kingdom	The ship was driven ashore and wrecked near "Machios", New Brunswick, British North America. She was on a voyage from Hull, Yorkshire to Saint John, New Brunswick.
Milo	United Kingdom	The paddle steamer caught fire and sank at Sunderland, County Durham
Zwei Gebruders	Duchy of Holstein	The ship was driven ashore and wrecked at Seaham, County Durham. She was on a voyage from Kiel to Leith, Lothian, United Kingdom.

== 11 May ==
List of shipwrecks: 11 May 1840
Ship	State	Description
Arabian	United Kingdom	The ship was driven ashore and wrecked at Griffins Cove, Lower Canada, British North America. All on board were rescued. She was on a voyage from the Clyde to Quebec City, Lower Canada.
Catherina	United Kingdom	The galiot was wrecked on Flamborough Head, Yorkshire. She was on a voyage from Hull, Yorkshire to Sunderland, County Durham.
Cesias	United Kingdom	The ship was wrecked on the Ower Sand, in the North Sea. Her crew were rescued. She was on a voyage from Memel, Prussia to London. Cesias was subsequently towed into Harwich, Essex by HMRC Badger ( Board of Customs).
Monarch	United Kingdom	The paddle steamer struck a rock off St. Abbs Head, Berwickshire and was holed. Her passengers were taken off by Royal Adelaide (United Kingdom). Monarch was on a voyage from London to Leith, Lothian, where she subsequently arrived.

== 12 May ==
List of shipwrecks: 12 May 1840
Ship	State	Description
Aimwell	United Kingdom	The ship was driven ashore near Darßer, Prussia. She was refloated on 26 May.
Chase	United Kingdom	The ship was sunk by ice off the west coast of Naissaar, Russia. All sixteen people on board were rescued by Canada (United Kingdom). Chase was on a voyage from Hull, Yorkshire to Saint Petersburg, Russia.
Independence	United Kingdom	The ship ran aground off Falsterbo, Sweden. She was on a voyage from Danzig to Weymouth, Dorset. Independence was refloated and put into Copenhagen, Denmark for repairs.
Thames	United Kingdom	The ship ran aground on the Grain Spit, off the coast of Kent.

== 13 May ==
List of shipwrecks: 13 May 1840
Ship	State	Description
Grampus	United States	The steamboat exploded and sank in the Mississippi River with the loss of two lives.
Hero	United Kingdom	The ship was driven ashore on Anticosti Island, Lower Canada, British North America.
Terpsichore	United States	The ship ran aground on the Merven Sand, in the North Sea. She was on a voyage from New Orleans, Louisiana to Cuxhaven. Terpsichore was later refloated.

== 15 May ==
List of shipwrecks: 15 May 1840
Ship	State	Description
Grant	United Kingdom	The ship was wrecked in the Monkey River.

== 16 May ==
List of shipwrecks: 16 May 1840
Ship	State	Description
Foland	France	The ship was struck by lightning and destroyed by fire in the Atlantic Ocean. Her crew were rescued by Clifton (United Kingdom). Foland was on a voyage from New York, United States to Havre de Grâce, Seine-Inférieure.

== 17 May ==
List of shipwrecks: 17 May 1840
Ship	State	Description
Erie	US	The whaling ship was grounded at Waitangi in New Zealand's Chatham Islands, and broke up over the following days.
José	Portugal	Slave Trade: The brig was run ashore and wrecked in the River Quillemane, Madagascar with the loss of 136 slaves. HMS Lily (Royal Navy) rescued her crew and 324 slaves, who were taken to Mauritius. José was on a voyage from Madagascar to Rio de Janeiro, Brazil.
Noordstar	Netherlands	The ship was driven ashore at Stevns Klint, Zealand, Denmark. She was on a voyage from Ventava, Courland Governorate to Rotterdam, South Holland. Noordstar was refloated on 19 May and put into Helsingør.

== 18 May ==
List of shipwrecks: 18 May 1840
Ship	State	Description
Greenfield	United States	The steamboat exploded and sank in the South Hadley Canal, Massachusetts with the loss of three lives.

== 19 May ==
List of shipwrecks: 19 May 1840
Ship	State	Description
Dalhousie Castle	United Kingdom	The ship was wrecked at Bonny, Africa. Her crew were rescued. She was on a voyage from Bonny to Liverpool, Lancashire.
Lady Young	(United Kingdom of Great Britain and Ireland) British North America	The ship was driven ashore at Waarde, Zeeland, Netherlands. Her crew were rescued. She was on a voyage from Antwerp, Belgium to Hamburg.

== 20 May ==
List of shipwrecks: 20 May 1840
Ship	State	Description
Sylvanus	United Kingdom	The schooner capsized in a squall 6 nautical miles (11 km) off Montrose, Forfarshire with the loss of one of her six crew. Survivors were rescued by the fishing vessel Aid (United Kingdom) and HMRC Cheerful ( Board of Customs). Sylavanus was on a voyage from Cromarty to Grangemouth, Stirlingshire.

== 21 May ==
List of shipwrecks: 21 May 1840
Ship	State	Description
George James	United Kingdom	The ship ran aground and was severely damaged at Honfleur, Calvados, France. She was on a voyage from Sunderland, County Durham to Honfleur.

== 22 May ==
List of shipwrecks: 22 May 1840
Ship	State	Description
Susannah Helen	United Kingdom	The ship was driven ashore on Juist, Kingdom of Hanover. Her crew were rescued. She was on a voyage from Hartlepool, County Durham to "Hollestandt".

== 23 May ==
List of shipwrecks: 23 May 1840
Ship	State	Description
Aedel	Prussia	The ship collided with Salus (United Kingdom) and was severely damaged at Swinemünde. She was then driven ashore. She was refloated on 31 May.
Alphonse	France	The ship was driven ashore at Swinemünde. She was refloated on 31 May.
Cadet	United Kingdom	The ship was driven into Salus (United Kingdom) and severely damaged at Swinemünde.
Carl Wilhelm	Prussia	The ship was driven ashore at Swinemünde. She was refloated on 31 May.
Elizabeth	United Kingdom	The ship was driven ashore at Swinemünde. She was refloated on 31 May.
Gazelle	United Kingdom	The ship was driven ashore at Swinemünde. She was refloated on 31 May.
Goose	United Kingdom	The ship was driven ashore at Swinemünde. She was refloated on 31 May.
Mary	United Kingdom	The ship was driven ashore at Swinemünde. She was refloated on 31 May.
Nancy	United Kingdom	The ship was driven ashore at Swinemünde.
Salus	United Kingdom	The ship was driven ashore at Swinemünde. She was refloated on 31 May.
Speculante	France	The ship was driven ashore at Swinemünde. She was refloated on 31 May.

== 24 May ==
List of shipwrecks: 24 May 1840
Ship	State	Description
Norion	Spain	The ship was driven ashore on Anholt, Denmark. Her crew were rescued.

== 25 May ==
List of shipwrecks: 25 May 1840
Ship	State	Description
Général Borgella	France	The ship struck rocks off "Porcala", Grand Duchy of Finland and sank. Her crew were rescued. She was on a voyage from Saint Petersburg, Russia to Nantes, Loire-Inférieure.
Paletina or Patelina	Prussia	The ship was driven ashore at Ambleteuse, Pas-de-Calais, France. She was on a voyage from Southampton, Hampshire, United Kingdom to Königsberg. She was refloated on 30 May and taken int Boulogne, Pas-de-Calais.
Robert Garden	United Kingdom	The schooner foundered in Peterhead Bay with the loss of all hands. She was on a voyage from Sunderland, County Durham to the Moray Firth.

== 26 May ==
List of shipwrecks: 26 May 1840
Ship	State	Description
Dussau	Stettin	The ship was wrecked at Malmö, Sweden. She was on a voyage from Çeşme, Ottoman Empire to Stettin.
Earl Talbot	United Kingdom	The ship was driven ashore on Goeree, Zeeland, Netherlands. She was on a voyage from Sunderland, County Durham to Schiedam, South Holland, Netherlands. Earl Talbot was refloated on 12 June and put into Rotterdam, South Holland for repairs.
Frau Catherina	(Denmark) Duchy of Schleswig	The ship was wrecked on the coast of Jutland. She was on a voyage from Grangemouth, Stirlingshire, United Kingdom to Rendsburg.
Geertruida	Netherlands	The ship was wrecked near Holmen, Denmark. Her crew were rescued. She was on a voyage from Amsterdam, North Holland to Riga, Russia.
Voyager	United Kingdom	The ship was wrecked at Bonaventura, Lower Canada, British North America.
Zenobia	United States	The ship was driven ashore at New York. She was on a voyage from Canton, China to New York. Zenobia was refloated and taken into New York.

== 27 May ==
List of shipwrecks: 27 May 1840
Ship	State	Description
Quincy	United Kingdom	The ship ran aground on the Oel Pinte, in the North Sea. She was on a voyage from Trinidad de Cuba to Bremen. Quincy was refloated on 29 May and taken into Bremen.
Reine	France	The ship was wrecked in the River Plate.
Ulrike	Prussia	The ship sprang a leak and was beached near "Pineta", where she was wrecked. She was on a voyage from Newcastle upon Tyne, Northumberland, United Kingdom to Swinemünde.
Vrow Hendrika	Denmark	The ship was driven ashore near Rendsburg, Duchy of Schleswig. She was on a voyage from Sønderborg to Antwerp, Belgium.

== 28 May ==
List of shipwrecks: 28 May 1840
Ship	State	Description
Napoleon	United Kingdom	The ship was wrecked on the Cat Keys, off the Bahamas. She was on a voyage from New Orleans, Louisiana, United States to Nassau, Bahamas.
Posen	Sweden	The ship was abandoned in the Atlantic Ocean. Her crew were rescued by T. P. (United States). Posen was on a voyage from Gothenburg to Philadelphia, Pennsylvania, United States.
Shetland	United Kingdom	The ship caught fire at Barbados and was scuttled.
Sylphide	United Kingdom	The ship was run down and sunk in Liverpool Bay by England (United Kingdom). Her crew were rescued by England. Sylphide was on a voyage from Liverpool, Lancashire to Saint Petersburg, Russia. Sylphide was refloated on 6 June and beached at Liverpool.
Thracian	Belgium	The ship was struck by a waterspout and damaged in the Atlantic Ocean. She was on a voyage from Antwerp to Havana, Cuba. Thracian put into Nassau, Bahamas, where she arrived on 30 June.

== 29 May ==
List of shipwrecks: 29 May 1840
Ship	State	Description
William and Thomas	United Kingdom	The ship was wrecked on the Swinebottoms. Her crew were rescued. She was on a voyage from Leith, Lothian to Copenhagen, Denmark.

== 30 May ==
List of shipwrecks: 30 May 1840
Ship	State	Description
Albion	United Kingdom	The ship was abandoned in the Atlantic Ocean and subsequently foundered. Her crew were rescued. She was on a voyage from London to Quebec City, Lower Canada, British North America.
Lively	United Kingdom	The ship sank near Dordrecht, South Holland, Netherlands. She was on a voyage from Liverpool, Lancashire to Dordrecht. She was later raised but was consequently condemned.
Triton	United Kingdom	The ship foundered off Ny-Hellesund, Norway. Her crew were rescued. She was on a voyage from Sunderland, County Durham to Memel, Prussia.

== 31 May ==
List of shipwrecks: 31 May 1840
Ship	State	Description
Mars	United Kingdom	The ship ran aground on the Debringoe Bank. She was on a voyage from Rouen, Seine-Inférieure, France to Hartlepool, County Durham.
Pelter	United Kingdom	The flat sank off the Hilbre Islands, Cheshire. Her crew were rescued.
Ulrika	Stettin	The ship was driven ashore on Rügen, Prussia. She was on a voyage from Newcastle upon Tyne, Northumberland, United Kingdom to Stettin.

== Unknown date ==
List of shipwrecks: Unknown date in May 1840
Ship	State	Description
Ann	(United Kingdom of Great Britain and Ireland) New South Wales	The schooner sprang a leak off Nobbys Island and was beached. Her crew were rescued by the cutter Rovers Bride ( (United Kingdom of Great Britain and Ireland) New South Wales). Ann was on a voyage from Newcastle to Sydney.
Charlotte	(United Kingdom of Great Britain and Ireland) New South Wales	The schooner was wrecked at Wollongong whilst her crew were ashore.
Citadelle	France	The ship ran aground on the Swinebottoms, in the Baltic Sea. She was refloated on 3 May and taken into Helsingør, Denmark.
Falcon	(United Kingdom of Great Britain and Ireland) New South Wales	The schooner was driven ashore in New Zealand's Bay of Plenty. Her crew were rescued.
Gezina Jansen	Flag unknown	The ship sank off Pillau, Kingdom of Prussia. She was refloated and taken into Pillau on 10 May.
Greyhound	(United Kingdom of Great Britain and Ireland) British North America	The brig was abandoned in the Atlantic Ocean before 29 May.
Heinrich	Flag unknown	The ship foundered in the North Sea off Egmond aan Zee, South Holland, Netherlands before 29 May.
Lively	United Kingdom	The ship sank off the Dutch coast before 26 May. She was on a voyage from Liverpool, Lancashire to Dordrecht, South Holland, Netherlands.
Pandora	United Kingdom	The ship was wrecked on Green Point, Cape Town, Cape Colony.
Sherbrooke	United Kingdom	The ship was driven ashore at the Pensacola Lighthouse, Florida Territory. She was on a voyage from Liverpool, Lancashire to Mobile, Alabama, United States. Sherbrooke was refloated on 3 June.
Thomas	United Kingdom	The brig ran aground on the Shipwash Sand, in the North Sea off the coast of Essex. She was refloated with assistance from Pearl and Superb (both United Kingdom) and taken into Harwich.
Victoria	United Kingdom	The brig was abandoned in the Atlantic Ocean before 12 May.
William	United Kingdom	The ship was wrecked on the Haisborough Sands, in the North Sea off the coast of Norfolk before 13 May. She was on a voyage from Memel, Prussia to Lowestoft, Suffolk.
