= Natchez and Hamburg Railroad =

1830s Mississippi

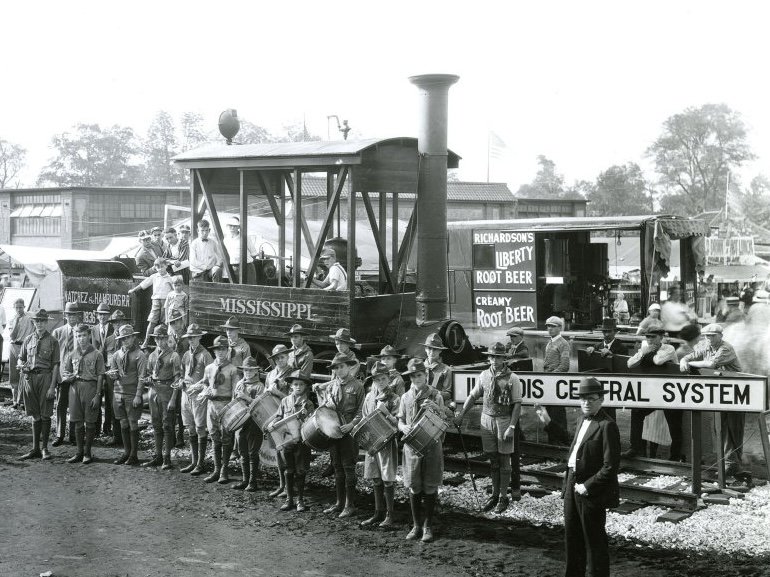
Boy Scouts with Mississippi locomotive believed to have been part of the Natchez and Hamburg rolling stock, photographed Indianapolis, 1927 (Indiana Album ia-0154-0061)

Natchez and Hamburg Railroad was a planned early 19th-century railroad of the southern United States, intended to connect Natchez to the Pearl River. Construction began in Adams County, Mississippi and got between 20 and 35 miles out of town, maybe as far as Franklin County, Mississippi. Construction involved as many as 800 "hands" (slaves) working on the track in 1837 before the Panic of 1837 halted progress and the line was abandoned. The planned route was northeast toward Canton, another business center, where the tracks would link to a New Orleans line. Planned stops included Raymond and Gallatin. The railroad shops and depot were destroyed by the Great Tornado of 1840. The Hamburg of the common name was possibly the Hamburg steamboat landing of Hinds County that was laid out in 1826 on the Big Black River.

The official corporate name for the rail line, organized in 1834, was Mississippi Railroad Company. The railroad's directors included James C. Wilkins, John T. Griffith, P. M. Lapice, J. A. Quitman, H. W. Huntington, Felix Huston, A. L. Bingaman, W. Vannerson, Edward Turner, J. B. Nevitt, R. M. Gaines, J. F. H. Claiborne, P. Hoggatt, S. A. Cartwright, Z. K. Fulton, and H. Chotard. Quitman was president of the Mississippi Senate in 1836 and obtained a state charter. The railroad was associated with a boom-and-bust cycle in Natchez, such that banks had millions of dollars in capital to spend on improvements but though "this might indicate wealth in abundance throughout this great state, but in reality it was the most rank inflation and insolvency. The only railroad that resulted from it was a few paltry miles at Natchez, and scarcely 50 miles of the Vicksburg & Brandon route. Speculation ran riot, and it is said that the wild revelry of it was stimulated by a class of speculative adventurers who afterward left the state. These banks dealt in real estate too, dealt in bonds, exchange and bills of credit, made loans and issued their own notes for circulation. The crash that began in 1836 seemed to make it all the more reckless, and men seemed to lose their heads and grasp at straws in their despair." Quitman went to Europe seeking a bridge loan to keep the railroad going but "returned to Natchez empty-handed."

According to historian Clayton James, in 1840 "Quitman resigned as president and returned to his law partnership with John T. McMurran. The railroad and its bank were soon bankrupt and in receivership. So ended the only attempt before the Civil War to tie Natchez into a major rail network. Its isolation from this 'modern' mode of conveying freight and passengers would be sorely felt as the decades passed."

== See also ==
- Oldest railroads in North America
- Tuscumbia, Courtland and Decatur Railroad
- South Carolina Canal and Railroad Company
