= William Johnson House (Natchez, Mississippi) =

Historic house in Mississippi, United States

- U.S. National Register of Historic Places
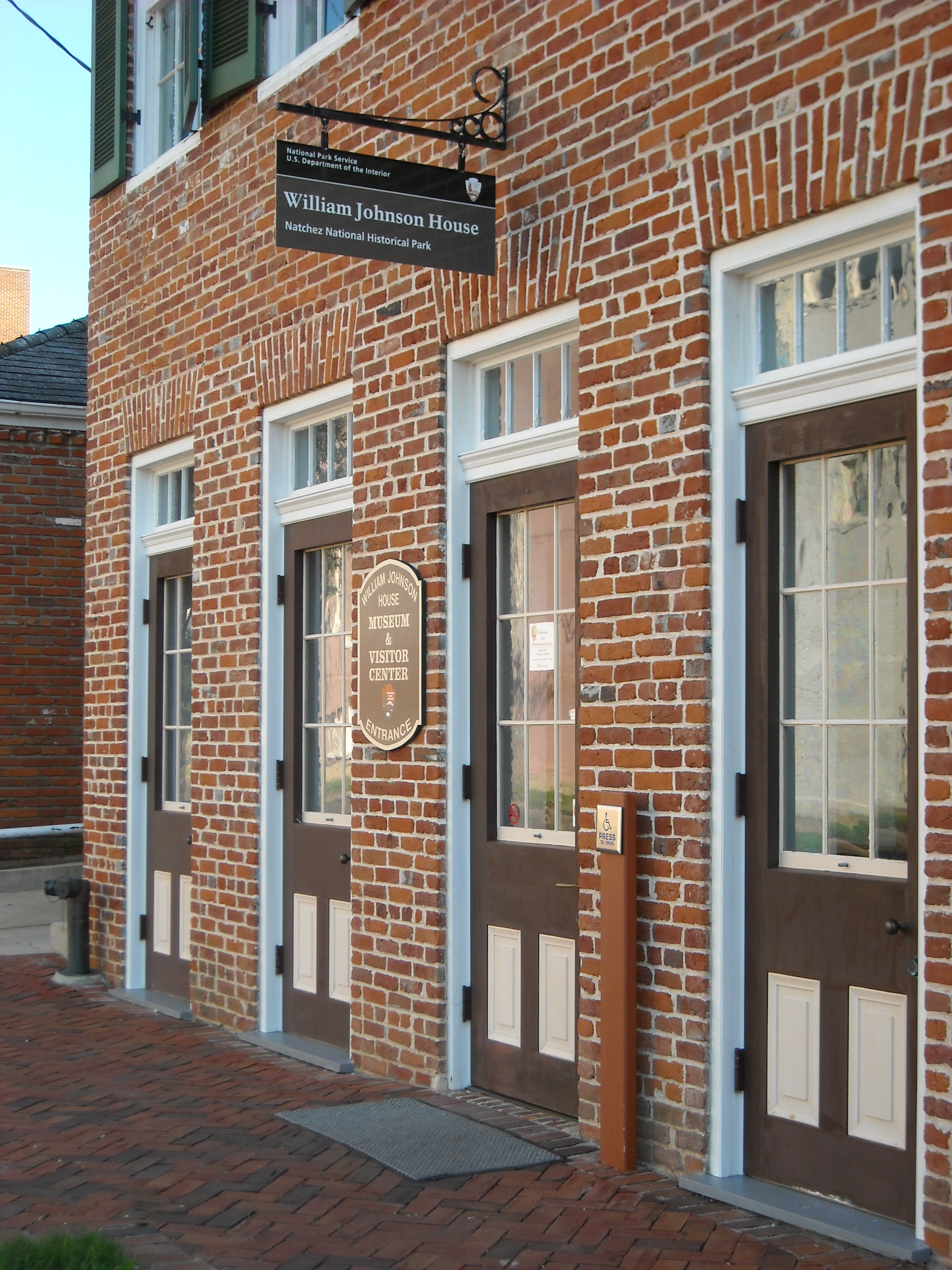
- Front of the house in 2009

- Location within Mississippi Location within the United States
- Location: 210 State St., Natchez, Mississippi
- Coordinates: 31°33′34″N 91°23′29″W
- Area: 0.2 acres (0.081 ha)
- Built: 1841
- Architect: Johnson, William
- NRHP reference No.: 76001086
- Added to NRHP: June 16, 1976

The William Johnson House, located at 210 State Street in Natchez, Mississippi, was constructed in 1840 and was the residence William Johnson, a free black man. Known also as "The Barber of Natchez", Johnson constructed his home from the bricks of other buildings destroyed in the tornado of 1840. Today the house is part of the National Historical Park of Natchez, Mississippi.

== Gallery ==
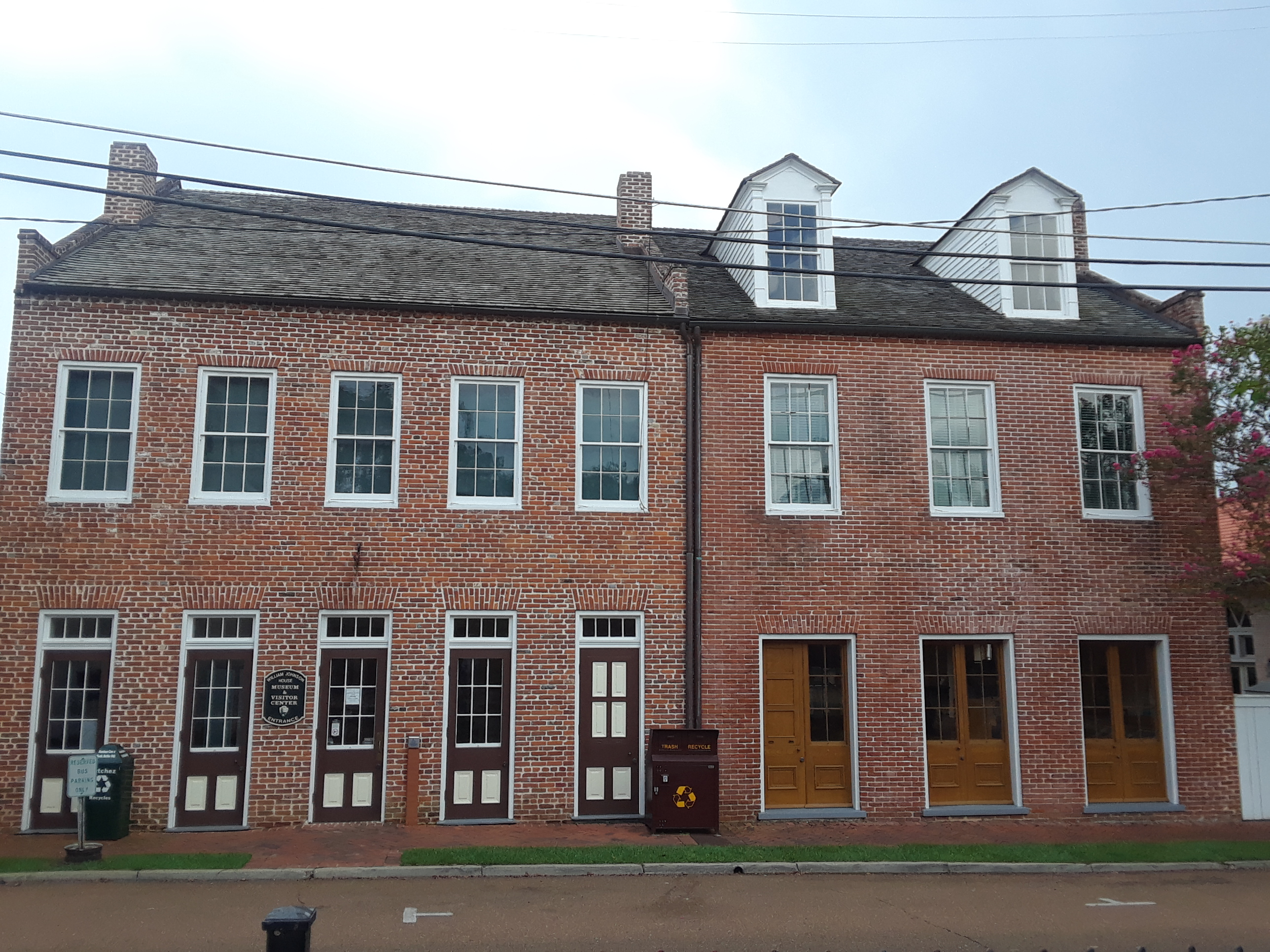
Front facing, 2017

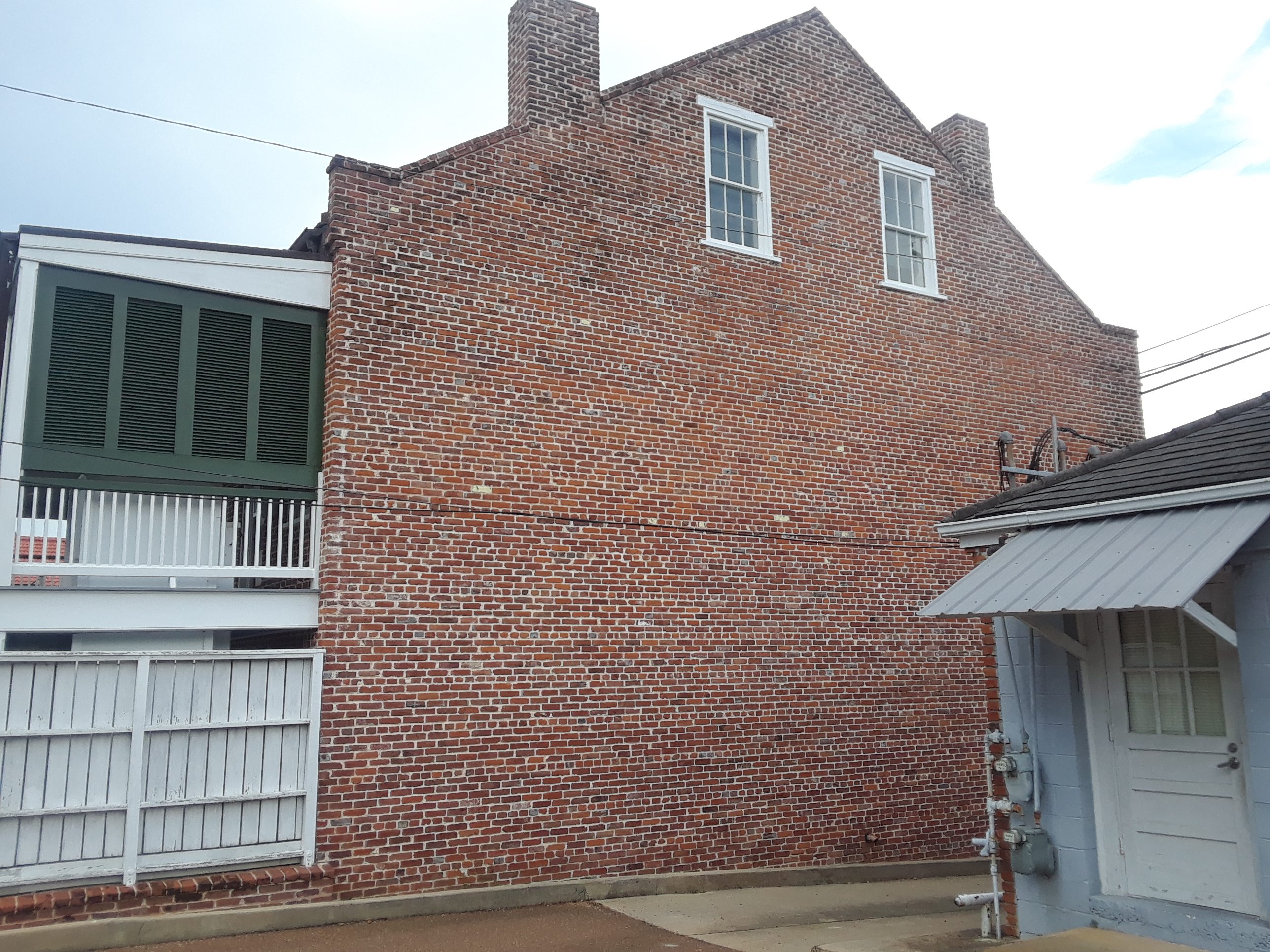
East facing, 2017

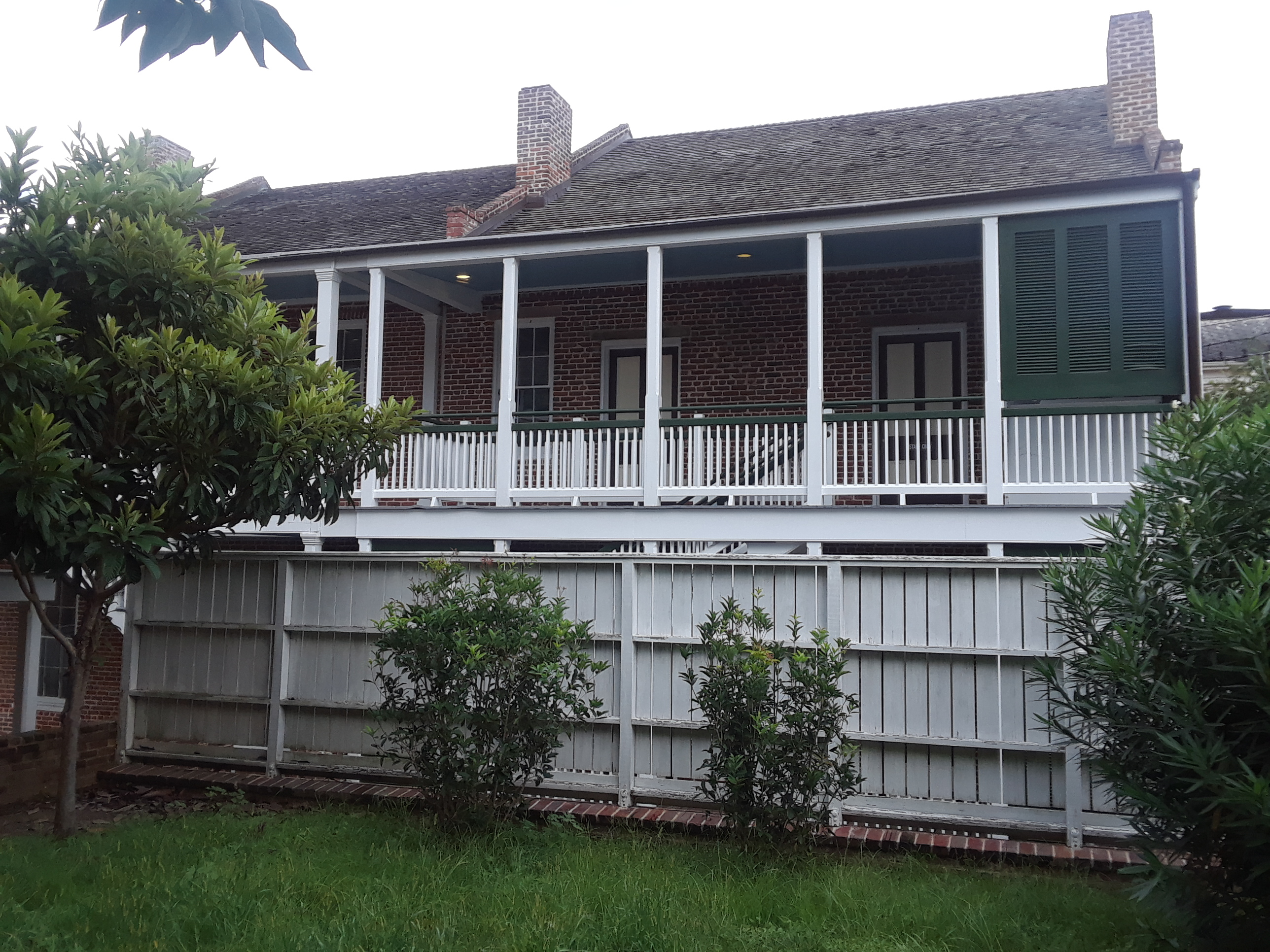
South facing, 2017

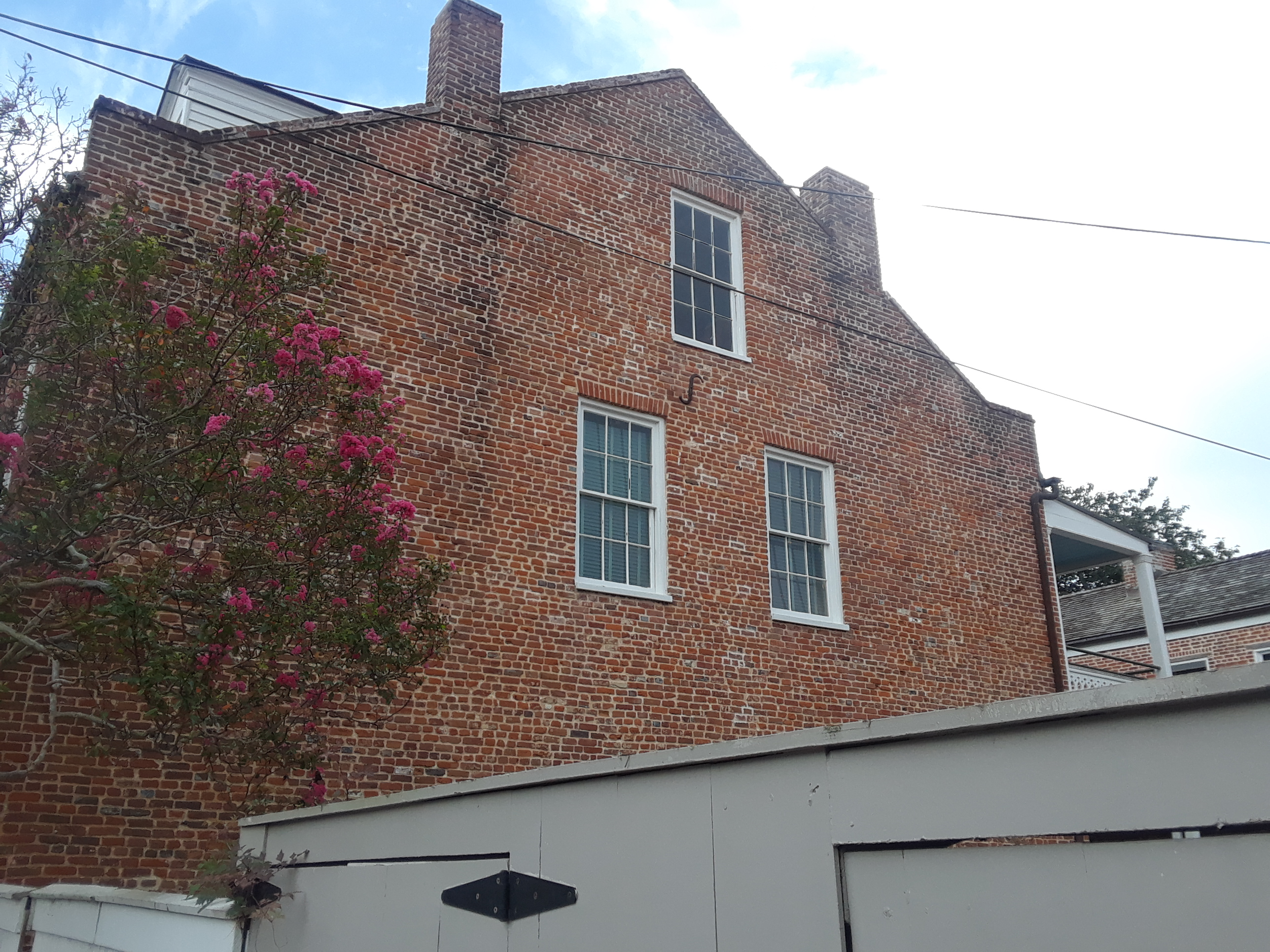
West facing, 2017
