= P. M. Lapice =

Sugar plantation owner (1797–1884)

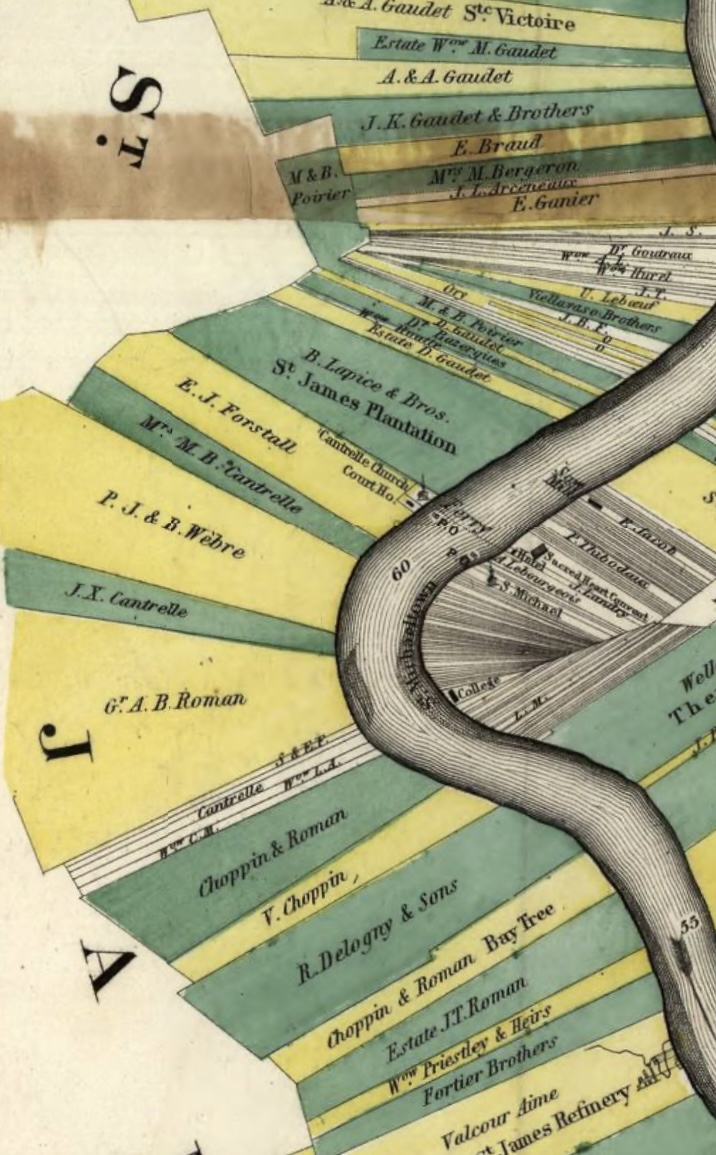
B. Lapice & Bros. sugar plantation in St. James Parish, Louisiana, from Norman's chart of the lower Mississippi River (1858)

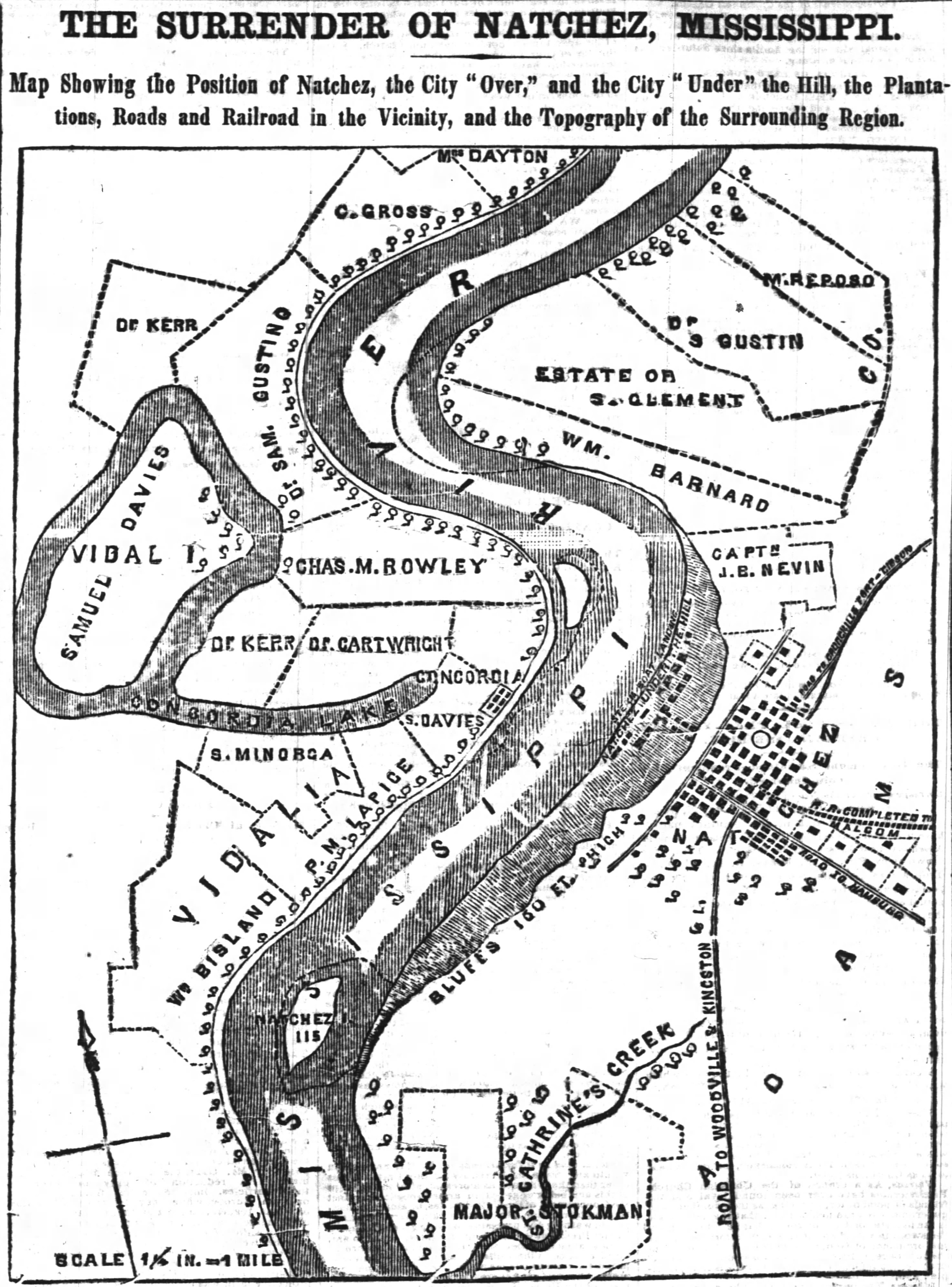
P. M. Lapice's property in Concordia Parish, Louisiana is pictured on this 1862 map of the Natchez, Mississippi area

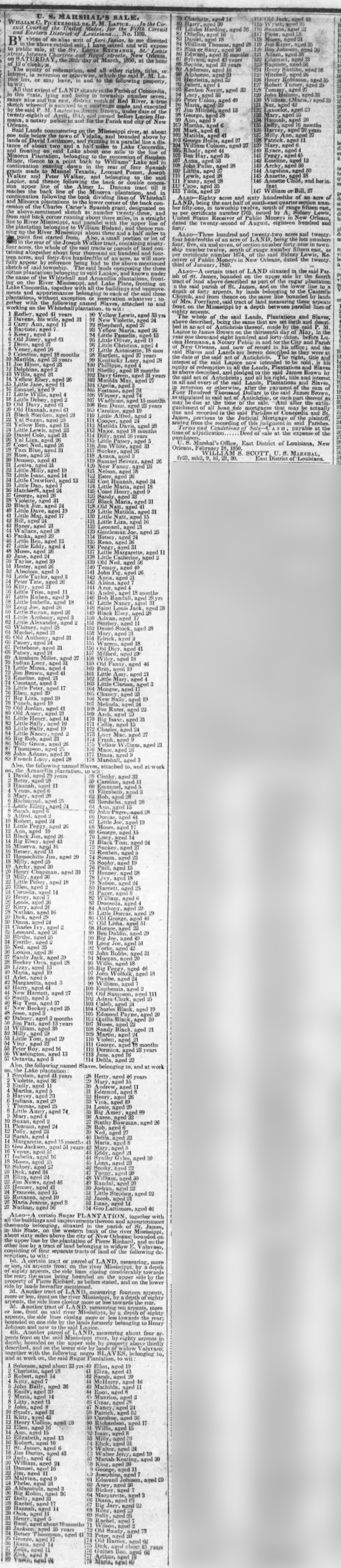
Listing of property and 493 people owned by P. M. Lapice, to be sold by U.S. Marshals (New Orleans Crescent, March 2, 1850)

Pierre Michel La Pice de Bergondy (March 1797 – February 2, 1884), generally known as P. M. Lapice, sometimes Peter Lapice, was a merchant, sugar planter, and owner of a large number of slaves in 19th-century Mississippi and Louisiana in the United States. He was credited with Louisiana sugar-industry firsts, including producing the first white sugar, erecting the first cane-mill with five rollers, and building the first successful bagasse burner.

== Biography ==
Lapice was born on Santo Domingo (now Haiti) and escaped during the Haitian Revolution, traveling as a young boy to New Orleans with his parents and brother. Lapice's father, a sugar and coffee planter of Santo Domingo, was said to be descended from "a noble Normandy family to whom were granted lands by Louis XIV of France...but losing his fortune by the [Haitian] Revolution, adopted Jeffersonian principles, dropped the name of De Bergondy and threw in the Mississippi river his jeweled sword, so often drawn for France and his king". Once in the United States, Pierre was sometimes known as Peter Lapice.

Lapice fought with the Orleans Battalion of Jean Baptiste Plauché and Andrew Jackson at the Battle of New Orleans during the War of 1812.

In his early career "he became a partner of Mr. Millandon, one of the first merchants of New Orleans, and went to Natchez, Miss., to represent the interests of his house at that point. While a resident of that city he became one of the most popular and prominent men and had built up under his direction the famous Bullet Bayou levee, which saved a large section from overflow". Lapice was initially a local merchant and cotton shipper. In 1825 he had a store at Natchez-Above-the-Hill. As of 1826 there were "brick stores opposite Mr. P. M. Lapice's" where merchants sold provisions. In 1828 he listed for sale his Natchez dwelling house on the Homochitto Road opposite Job Routh's; it had eight rooms, a garden on 12 acres, a kitchen, a cistern, and a cellar.

His brother Joseph M. Lapice operated the "stand" in Natchez as of 1829.

In 1833 he advertised that he wished to buy cypress logs for a steam mill he was building; "raftsmen will find it in their interest to stop their rafts a few miles above Natchez and give him a call at the Saw-Mill". In 1835 he was the director of a company that insured cotton shipped via the Mississippi River.

Lapice's first plantation was opposite Vicksburg, Mississippi. He reportedly first entered the business of growing and processing sugarcane slightly before 1833. He sometimes served as "security" in legal matters for slave trader and cotton planter Rice C. Ballard. One of his plantations was in the path of the Great Natchez Tornado of 1840, and several enslaved people bound there were killed: "M. Lapice. Esq. suffered immensely in his Arno plantation, below Vidalia. His negro quarters were all blown down, four or five negroes killed outright, about twenty dangerously, some of them mortally wounded, and thirty or forty more seriously injured. His plantation has resounded with groans since the storm. He estimates his loss at thirty thousand dollars". In 1850 there was a lethal typhoid outbreak at his Whitehall plantation.

Lapice is believed to have owned seven or eight plantations. Lapice's sugar plantations were slave-labor camps filled with hundreds of people imported from elsewhere in the United States. Lapice was one of the South's largest slaveholders; in 1850, Lapice enslaved 573 people in Concordia and St. James Parishes.

His indebtedness resulted in large-scale sales of his plantations and slaves (who made the agricultural land valuable by their work). Under the auspices of the U.S. Marshals, 493 people, ranging from centenarian Old Sampson to 15-month-old Margarette, were to be sold from four plantations in Louisiana by auction at the St. Louis Exchange in New Orleans on Saturday, March 20, 1850. According to historian Damian Alan Pargas, there was a subsequent 1852 sale of property owned by P. M. Lapice, consisting of a plantation and 256 enslaved people: "The terms and conditions of the sale were simply 'cash on the spot'—no provisions for families to be kept together were specified." Financial troubles or no, Lapice continued in the sugar business and was ultimately credited with a number of Louisiana sugar-industry firsts, including producing the first white sugar, erecting the first five-roller cane-mill, and building the first successful bagasse burner, bagasse being the fibrous plant matter left after cane is crushed to extract sugarcane juice.

Economic historians have found that by the time of the American Civil War, Lapice was one of the largest slave holders in St. James Parish, Louisiana. Records from one Louisiana parish show that the firm Lapice Brothers produced 600 hogsheads of sugar and 25,000 gallons molasses in 1860, by using the labor of 245 enslaved people. In 1863, Lapice was appointed to a delegation of Louisiana planters who met with Abraham Lincoln "to request of him Such action and assistance, as while restoring the State to the Union, will as far as possible, secure the prosperity of the loyal people therein". Lincoln met with the group and wrote them a letter in reply. A posthumous biography stated that Lapice's fortune was "swept away during or after" the war, but to be clear, prior to the war, enslaved people were valued at an average of $1,000 per, so when all those people "walked off the job" due to the end of slavery in the United States, they took Lapice's "fortune" with them.

After the war, Lapice traveled to Java (in what is now Indonesia), where he collected a variety of sugarcane that came to be known as Lapice cane. Lapice died at his Lauderdale plantation in St. James Parish, Louisiana, in 1884, at the age of 86.

== See also ==
- Natchez and Hamburg Railroad
- Slave trade in the United States
- History of slavery in Louisiana
- List of largest slave sales in the United States
