= William Johnson (barber) =

African American barber (1809–1851)

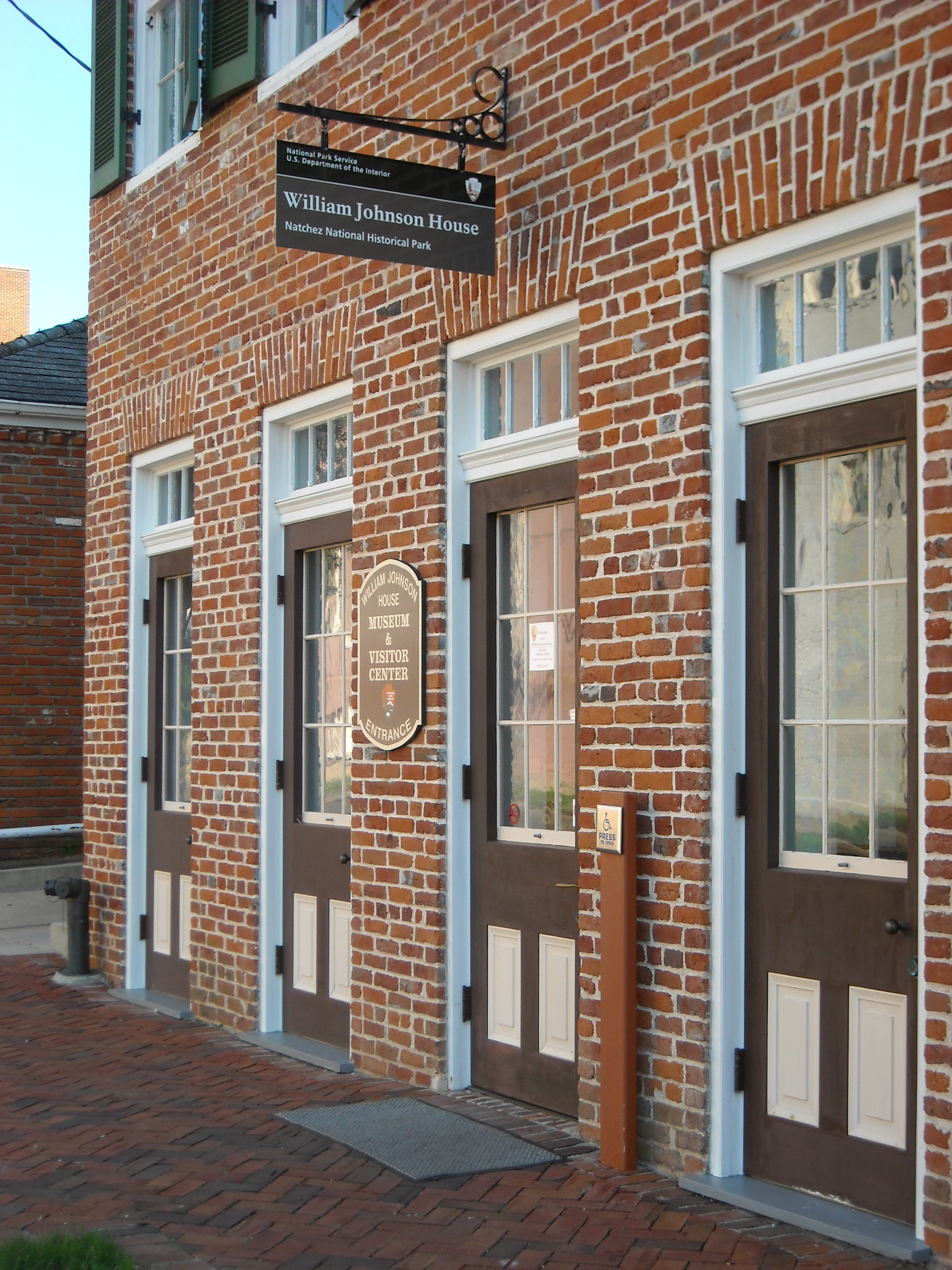
William Johnson House Museum at Natchez National Historical Park in Natchez, Mississippi.

William T. Johnson (c. 1809 – June 17, 1851) was a free African American barber of biracial parentage, who lived in Natchez, Mississippi.

He was born into slavery but his owner, also named William Johnson and thought to be his father, emancipated him in 1820. His mother, Amy, had been freed in 1814, and his sister Adelia in 1818. Johnson trained as a barber with his brother-in-law, James Miller, and began working in Port Gibson, Mississippi. He returned to Natchez, becoming a successful entrepreneur with a barbershop, bath house, bookstore, and land holdings. Though a formerly enslaved person, William Johnson went on to enslave sixteen people himself. He began a diary in 1835, which he continued through the remainder of his life. Also in 1835, he married Ann Battle, a free woman of color with a similar background to his, and they had eleven children. Johnson loaned money to many people, including the governor of Mississippi, who had signed his emancipation papers.

Johnson was murdered in 1851 after an adjudicated boundary dispute by a mixed-race neighbor named Baylor Winn, in front of his son, a free black apprentice, and an enslaved person. Winn was held in prison for two years and brought to trial twice; Johnson was such a well-respected businessman that the outrage over his murder caused the trial to be held in a neighboring town. In that town, no one knew Winn, so they didn't know that he was half-black. Since Mississippi law forbade blacks from testifying against whites in criminal cases, Winn's defense was that he was half-white and half-Native American, making him white by law. The defense worked; none of the (black) witnesses could testify, and Winn escaped conviction.

Johnson's diary was rediscovered in 1938 and published in 1951. It reveals much of the daily life of a 19th-century Mississippi businessman, including the fact that he was himself later a slaveholder. His papers are archived at Louisiana State University.

Through an act of Congress, the home of William Johnson became a part of the Natchez National Historical Park in 1990.
