= 1846 Grenada tornado =

Tornado in Mississippi, USA

Meteorological history
- Date: May 7, 1846

Unknown-strength tornado
- Max width: ≥600 yd (550 m)
- Highest winds: Unknown (Note: Thomas P. Grazulis, the meteorologist responsible for the official database of tornadoes from before 1950, assigned pre-1880 tornadoes a rating on a rare occasion. Since Grazulis did not assign a rating to the Grenada tornado, the tornado has no official classification on the Fujita scale.)

Overall effects
- Fatalities: 21
- Injuries: 60
- Damage: $65,000 (1846 USD) $2.33 million (2025 USD)
- Part of the list of North American tornadoes and tornado outbreaks

The 1846 Grenada tornado was a tornado that struck Grenada, Mississippi, on May 7, 1846. The tornado killed 21 people, injured 60, and destroyed 60 or 70 buildings in the southern half of Grenada, Yalobusha County, Mississippi (Note: Grenada County, Mississippi was not established until 1870.) in the United States. Other accounts had it that 112 buildings were destroyed, including 17 homes. Property damage was estimated at $65,000 to US$80,000 (equivalent to $2,866,667 in 2025). According to the Mississippi Democrat of Carrollton, Mississippi, "When the tornado passed through Grenada it must have been at least 600 yards (550 m) from one extreme to the other; but about the centre and 50 yards (46 m) each way therefrom, the principal damage was done."

According to the New Orleans Picayune, "On the outside of a letter to a friend, is written the words, 'Grenada is in ruins, and many of her inhabitants are destroyed; names cannot be given, or numbers set down." The tornado struck at about 2:30 p.m. Both schools in the town were in session at the time the hurricane struck, and both were destroyed. The teacher of the girls' school was killed, her body was found across the river in a tree. The force of the tornado "shattered" the logs of the cabin that housed the girls' school. The teacher of the boys' school survived but was seriously injured. The newly built Baptist church was leveled.

According to a scrapbooked clipping of a news article entitled "The Great Hurricane," written by Aaron Davis, the tornado approached the town from the west. The same tornado later continued northward into Maury County, Tennessee, where there were no casualties but three farms were damaged.

== See also ==
- 1840 Natchez tornado
