= 1882 Grinnell tornado =

1882 tornado in Iowa, U.S.

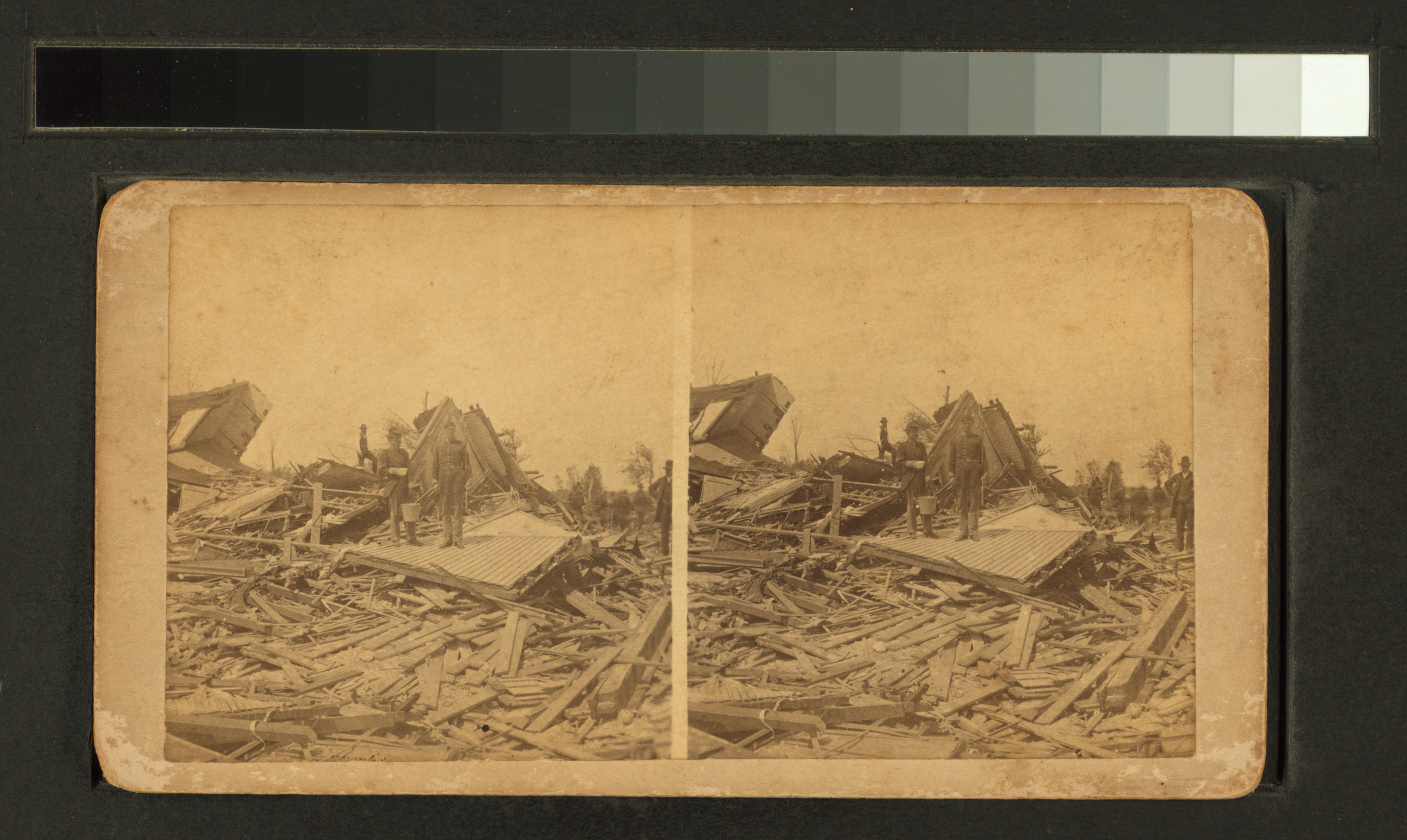
- A stereo card of damage from the tornado in Grinnell; five people were buried under rubble at this location but survived

Meteorological history
- Date: June 17, 1882

F5 equiv. tornado

Overall effects
- Fatalities: ≥ 68
- Injuries: ~ 300 (estimated)

On June 17, 1882, one of the deadliest tornadoes in Iowa history moved through several communities east of Des Moines, Iowa, notably Grinnell and Malcolm, killing 68 people and injuring an estimated 300 more. The tornado produced F5-rated damage along a track spanning over 100 miles. Later estimates suggest that more than 100 people may have been killed by the tornado.

== Tornado summary ==
Shortly before the tornado, it was noted that "the northern sky was hung with conical, downard-pointing clouds, the like of which none of us had ever seen." The tornado touched down at night, moving to the west. Witnesses stated that the tornadic storm was accompanied by heavy rain and loud thunder. The tornado damaged buildings and foliage after touching down. Lightning was also produced by the storm as it continued to move to the west; a June 1882 publication of The Republican described that the tornado moved at exceptionally fast speeds, producing heavy damage but not damaging one place for more than a few minutes at a time. The publication also noted that the tornado remained relatively narrow along its track, despite producing exceptionally intense damage to areas it impacted directly.

The tornado was visible as it swiftly approached the town of Grinnell; the Grinnell College noted that "two tornadoes formed, one from the southwest and one from the north", indicating a possible twin tornado that accompanied the main tornado that was bearing down on Grinnell. The tornado killed 39 people in Grinnell, leveling dozens of homes and destroying the college campus located in the town. Along with the 39 people killed in Grinnell, the tornado killed a further ten people in the Rippey area, seven in Jasper County and ten more in Malcom.

== Aftermath ==
Following the event, Josiah Grinnell, founder of the town of Grinnell, helped to raise money to aid with recovery efforts. The Grinnell College counted total monetary losses from the tornado to be approximately $80,000 (1882 USD); the college's insurance policy over covered around $10,000 of that amount. After the tornado was mentioned in a publication of Harper's Weekly, donations from the public were sent to Grinnell from around the United States. In 1889, Grinnell College's yearbook was named The Cyclone, a reference to the tornado. Along with over 500 photographs that were taken by members of the public and photographers, several photos of damage from the tornado were also moved into the Library of Congress.

== See also ==
- 2022 Winterset tornado, an EF4 tornado that killed six people southwest of Des Moines over 100 years later
