= Natchez National Historical Park =

National Historical Park of the United States

- U.S. National Register of Historic Places
- U.S. National Historical Park
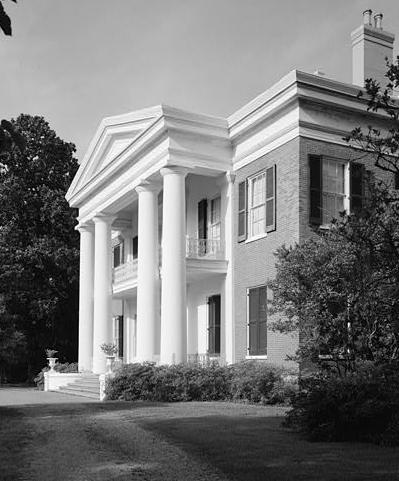
- Melrose, one of the sites preserved in the park

- Location within Mississippi Location within the United States
- Location: Natchez, Adams County, Mississippi, USA
- Coordinates: 31°32′36″N 91°22′59″W
- Area: 108.07 acres (0.4373 km^{2})
- Visitation: 41,356 (2025)
- Website: Natchez National Historical Park
- NRHP reference No.: 01000276
- Added to NRHP: October 7, 1988

Natchez National Historical Park interprets and preserves the history of Natchez, Mississippi, and is managed by the National Park Service.

The park consists of four separate sites:

Fort Rosalie preserves the site of an eighteenth-century French colonial fortification. It was later renamed "Fort Panmure" and later passed successively under British, Spanish, and United States control. The fort site is open to the public.

The William Johnson House preserves the home of William Johnson, a free Black barber and businessman in nineteenth-century Natchez whose diary has been published.

Melrose was the plantation estate of John T. McMurran, a lawyer, state senator, and planter who lived in Natchez from 1830 until the American Civil War.

Forks of the Road Market is the site of the second-largest domestic slave market in the Deep South between 1832 and 1863. This unit of the park opened in an official ceremony on June 18, 2021.

Both the Melrose and the William Johnson houses contain furnishings related to life in antebellum Natchez, as well as other exhibits. The collection at Melrose's two-story Greek Revival house and quarters used by enslaved people include painted floor cloths, mahogany, a punkah, a set of Rococo Revival parlor furniture, a set of Gothic Revival dining room chairs, and bookcases with books dating to the 18th century. These objects were collected from families in the Natchez area, including the McMurran family. The collection in the Johnson house includes artifacts associated with Johnson's household and personal life. Archaeological artifacts found in the park are also on display.

== Legal history ==
The National Historical Park was authorized on October 7, 1988 (Pub. L. 100–479, H.R. 4457). The William Johnson House was added to it on September 28, 1990 (Pub. L. 101–379, H.R. 4501). As with all historic areas administered by the National Park Service, the park was listed on the National Register of Historic Places.

Fort Rosalie was already included in the National Register as part of the 1972 NRHP-listed Natchez Bluffs and Under-the-Hill Historic District; the William Johnson House, at 210 State St., is a few blocks from the Fort Rosalie site and is both separately NRHP-listed and also included in the Natchez On-Top-of-the-Hill Historic District. Melrose is located about two miles southeast of Fort Rosalie.
