= Great Natchez Tornado =

Violent F4+ tornado in Mississippi, US

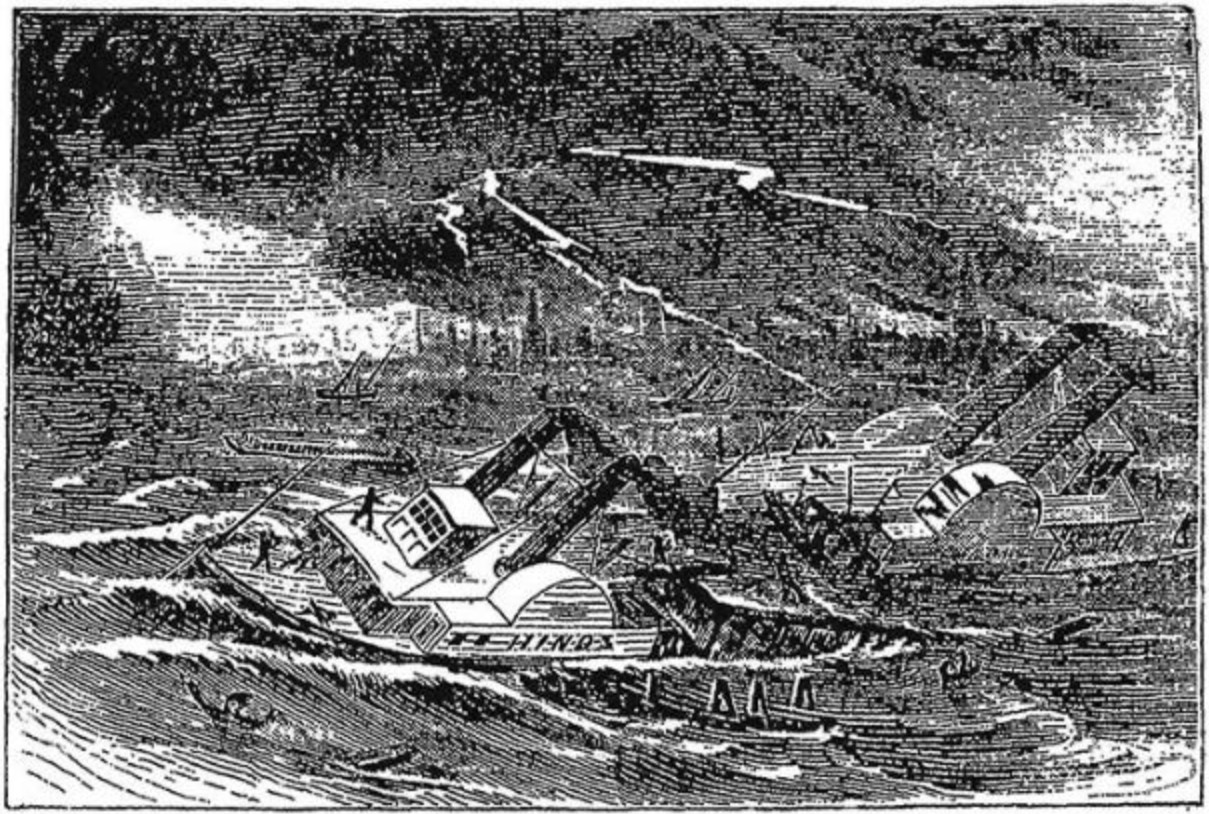
- The tornado capsizing steamboats (Lloyd's steamboat directory, and disasters on the western waters, 1856)

Meteorological history
- Formed: May 7, 1840, 1:01 p.m. CST (UTC−06:00)

F4 tornado
- on the Fujita scale

Overall effects
- Fatalities: 317+ fatalities, 109+ injured
- Damage: $1.26 million ($40,640,000 in 2025 USD) (Note: All losses are in 1840 USD unless otherwise noted.)
- Areas affected: Louisiana and Mississippi, particularly in and near Vidalia and Natchez

The Great Natchez Tornado was a deadly tornado that hit Natchez, Mississippi, on Thursday, May 7, 1840. The tornado, while officially unrated, was the second-deadliest tornado in United States history; at least 317 people were killed and at least 109 were injured. Its 35-mile-long (56 km), 1,000-yard-wide (910 m; 3,000 ft; 0.57 mi; 0.91 km) path was marked by severe damage and uncertain estimates of casualties, though many enslaved Africans—possibly numbering in the hundreds—reportedly died on plantations in Louisiana. Tornado expert Thomas P. Grazulis retroactively rated the tornado F4 on the Fujita scale, while another report ranked it F5.

== May 6 "hurricane" ==
The day before the Natchez tornado, a "hurricane" crossed through Natchitoches Parish. As told in a 1920 history of the area, "The Natchez hurricane, on May 6, 1840, swept over the Southern part of Natchitoches Parish, coming from the Southwest, originating in the Gulf of Mexico. The day following, May 7th, another followed, in the identical path of the other."

== Event description ==
This massive tornado formed approximately twenty miles southwest of Natchez, shortly before 1 p.m., and moved northeast along the Mississippi River. It followed the river directly, stripping forests from both shores. The vortex then struck the river-port of Natchez Landing, located below the bluff from Natchez. This windstorm tossed 116 flatboats (of the 120 docked at Natchez that day) into the river, drowning their crews and passengers. One report estimated that 200 boatmen had been killed. Other boats were picked up and thrown onto land. A piece of a steamboat window was reportedly found 30 miles (48 km) from the river. Many doing business on shore were also killed. At Natchez Landing, the destruction of dwellings, stores, steamboats and flatboats was almost complete. It then moved into the town of Natchez, though its full width of devastation also included the river and the Louisiana village of Vidalia immediately across from Natchez. It was reported, "the air was black with whirling eddies of walls, roofs, chimneys and huge timbers from distant ruins ... all shot through the air as if thrown from a mighty catapult." The central and northern portions of Natchez were slammed by the funnel and many buildings were completely destroyed. Forty-eight people were killed on land, and 269 others were killed on the river. Natchez-Under-the-Hill, the town's steamboat landing and red light district, presented "a scene of desolation and ruin which sickens the heart and beggars description—all, all, is swept away, and beneath the ruins still lay crushed the bodies of many strangers. It would fill volumes to depict the many escapes and heart-rending scenes; one of the most interesting was the rescue of Mrs. Alexander from the ruins of the steamboat hotel; she was found greatly injured, with the two children in her arms, and they both dead!" A brick-built Methodist church at Kingston was also destroyed by the tornado; a one-room neoclassical church building replaced it in 1856.

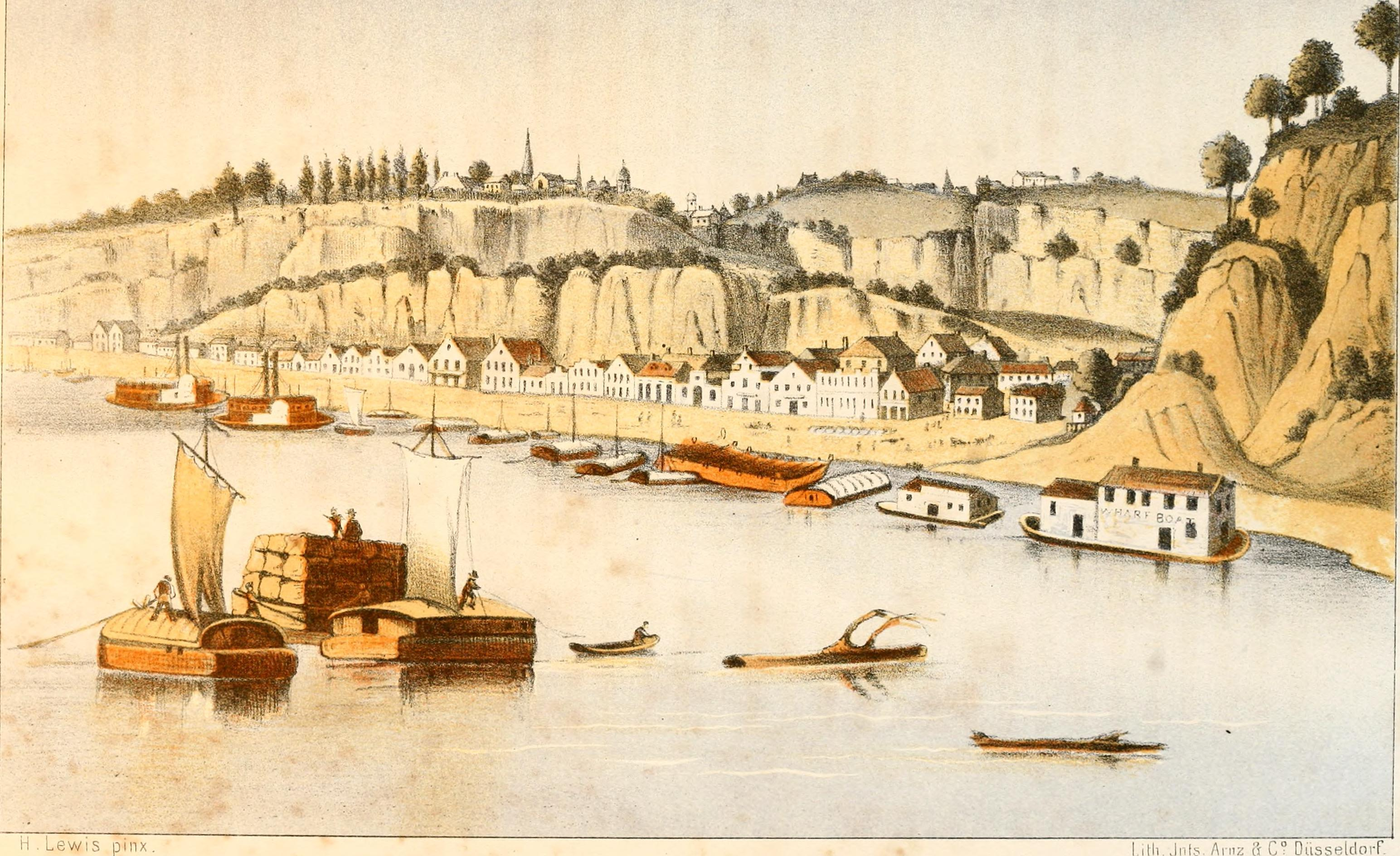
Natchez from the River, probably painted in the 1830s by Henry Lewis

The damage to the landscape was said to be substantial and lasting: "Unparallelled was the destruction of this hurricane. For miles the view was unobstructed, the timber was all destroyed, and at Pierre La Butte Bluffs the top soil was all blown off in places for several feet. The matter in the soil that supplied the arborescent fibre was blown away or destroyed, and the timber to this day, is a stunted diminutive growth, although it has been 80 years since the storm occurred. The violence of the storm passed about half a mile below the mouth of Cane River, and its path crossed Red River. Eli Du Bois and Landry Carasco were blown across river, and lodged in a thorn tree, unhurt. A cart and yoke of oxen were blown across the river, and were unhurt. The track of this destructive hurricane, crossed latt Lake and Suoffords Creek, and the effects of it are visible today. At Natchez the destruction was awful. Several steamboats were destroyed. The Hines [sic] was blown into the river, and capsized, and the crew and all the passengers were lost, except four. The wreck of the Hines was afterwards found at Baton Rouge, with 51 dead bodies on board, 48 males, and 3 females. Among the latter was a little girl of three years. The Prairie, just arrived from St. Louis, the whole upper deck was blown off, all passengers and crew were blown into the river, and drowned, among the number four ladies. The wharf boat and two hundred flat boats sank, and many lives were lost. Four hundred people were known to have been killed." The steamboat Hinds was recovered and brought to shore roughly two weeks after the storm. The Prairie was left "lying at our wharf torn to pieces 'blown up' by the wind worse than [any] boat was blown up by steam. The hull and machinery is all that is left of her. Her cabin was carried away, floor and all. The wheel houses were unroofed, and what remains of the boat is rent and shattered in an awful manner." The steamboat St. Lawrence was also reported destroyed; according to an early dispatch, "she was lifted many feet out of the water and instantly dashed to the bottom of the river with every soul on board."

The tornado struck Concordia Parish, Louisiana first if the tornado was traveling northwest. The parish courthouse at Vidalia was flattened, killing Judge Keeton. P. M. Lapice owned a sugar plantation in the path of the storm, and "suffered immensely in his Arno plantation, below Vidalia. His negro quarters were all blown down, four or five negroes killed outright, about twenty dangerously, some of them mortally wounded, and thirty or forty more seriously injured. His plantation has resounded with groans since the storm. He estimates his loss at thirty thousand dollars". The Free Trader stated, "Reports have come in from plantations 20 miles distant in Louisiana, and the rage of the tempest was terrible. Hundreds of (slaves) killed, dwellings swept like chaff from their foundations, the forest uprooted, and the crops beaten down and destroyed. Never, never, never, was there such desolation and ruin." Henry Tooley reported that there were 74 injuries in the city of Natchez and 35 injuries on the river.

Senate Document No. 199 (27th Congress, 2nd Session) was the report of the commission to fix the border line between the United States and the Republic of Texas. In the Journal of the Joint Commission under date of May 26, 1840, scouts reported observations made in the vicinity of the Sabine River, which is the boundary between Louisiana and Texas, "We crossed to-day the path of a recent tornado, which had prostrated trees and cane on the river banks. Its course was observed to be from south 72 degrees west to north 72 degrees east, and the track to be from 300–400 yards [270–370 meters] wide. This was supposed to be the same tornado which occasioned such dreadful destruction of human lives and houses in Natchez on the 7th of May."

The first news account of the tornado was written for the New Orleans Picayune at 5 p.m. and sent downriver on the steamboat Meteor. Local businessmen "Mr. Ruffner and S. J. Boyd Esq." estimated the financial loss to be US$1,260,000 (equivalent to $40,635,000 in 2025). Planter Stephen Duncan reportedly "paid the rent" so Dr. Pollard could house and treat the injured at the Tremont House hotel, which was converted to be a hospital during the crisis. Other slave owning capitalists in the area sent "large gangs of slaves" to work clearing away debris and extricating the bodies of victims from the collapsed buildings where they died.

1841 map of Concordia Parish showing track of 1840 tornado

Horatio Eustis was at his father-in-law Henry Chotard's Somerset plantation, east of the village, and described it in a letter to his father Gen. Abraham Eustis, writing that the tornado "demolished entirely the lower town leaving but one house standing there. In the upper town which is built mostly of brick many of the larger edifices, such as the Hotels, the churches, and the railroad Depot, were either levelled with the dust or so minced that the walls must come down. The force of the wind was incredible. Iron spikes were borne by the blast with such force and direction as to be driven up to their heads, into the walls of houses. Other walls were pierced (even interior partitions) by pieces of shingles lanced from roofs a hundred rods distant. Men who were able to clutch hold of something firmer, were stripped perfectly naked. The present estimate of lives lost, is about 300, principally at the landing on the river bank where nearly every flat boat and steamboat was sunk or destroyed. The hurricane [tornado] passed just at the dinner hour [about 1:15 p.m.] of the town, or the loss, on land, would have been greater...Contributions are daily arriving for the relief of the distressed, but years must pass before the town can be rebuilt as before, and the trees, which furnished a grateful shade in the principal streets, cannot be replaced.Much damage was done to some of the plantations in the uplands, and negroes killed. How far it extended into the interior is not yet ascertained."

According to a history of Natchez published in 1909, "Natchez was visited by a delegation from New Orleans, bringing a corps of surgeons and several thousand dollars of money, for the relief of the suffering. Killed in the city, 48; perished on the river, 269; wounded in the city, 74; in the river, 35."

== Aftermath ==
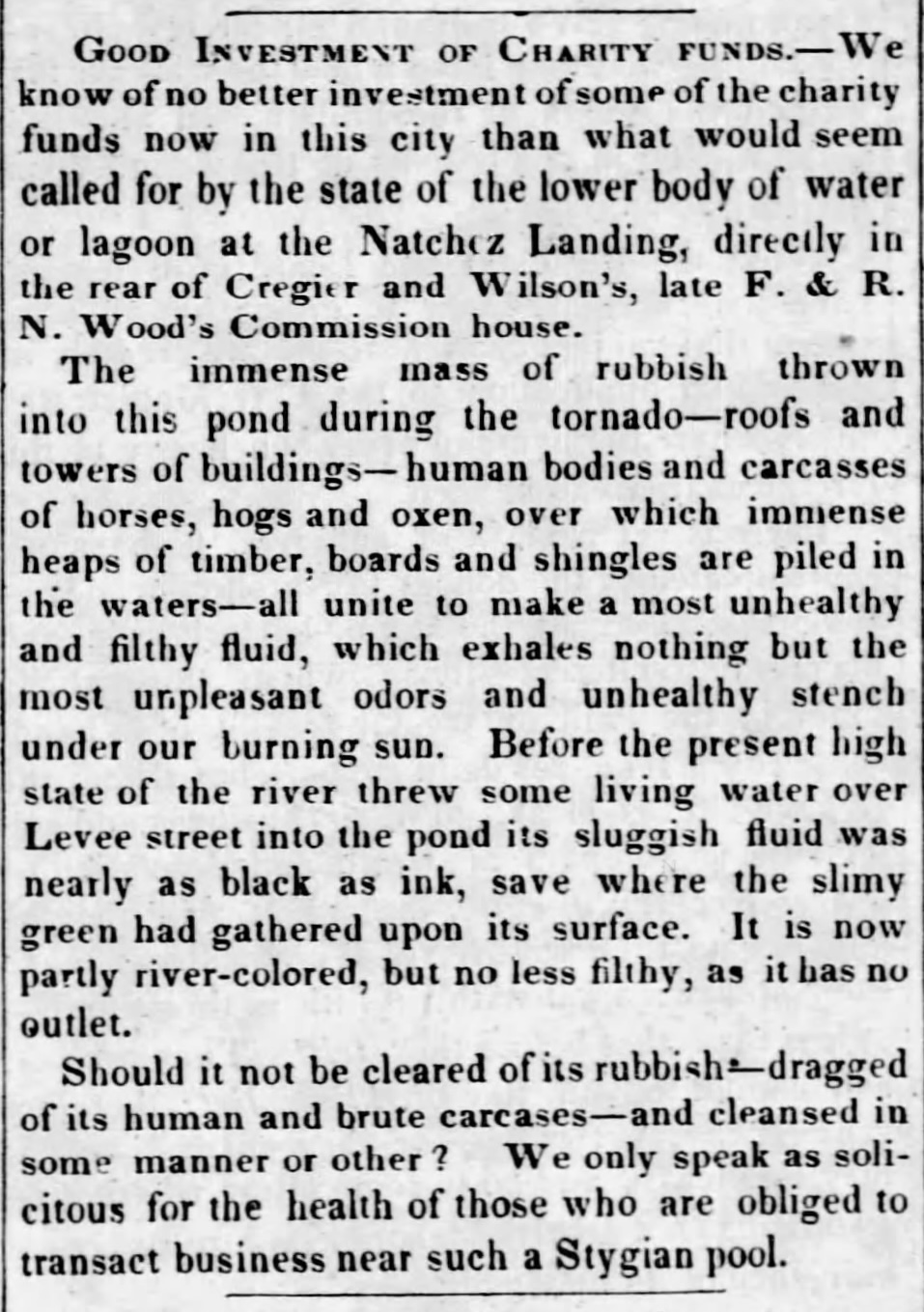
A month after the tornado, the lagoon at the Natchez Landing was a "Stygian pool" of decomposition and accumulated debris (Mississippi Free Trader, June 11, 1840)

The final death toll was 48 on land (with 47 deaths in Natchez and one in Vidalia) and 269 on the river, mostly from the sinking of flatboats. In addition to the 317 deaths, only 109 were injured, a testament to the tornado's intensity. The tornado is to this day ranked as the second deadliest in American history, and caused $1,260,000 in damage. The actual death toll may be higher than what is listed, as slave deaths were often not counted during this time period. According to a National Park Service report on the Natchez Historical Park, "Sir Charles Lyell, who visited Natchez later in the 1840s, wrote about the tornado and its effect on Natchez: 'This tornado checked the progress of Natchez, as did the removal of the seat of legislature to Jackson'...The 1840s were a decade of repair throughout the city, and few of the landmark public buildings and great mansions of Natchez were built in the decades of the 1840s; notable exceptions are St. Mary's Cathedral (1842; unfinished until 1859), and Melrose. Natchez Under-the-Hill was almost totally rebuilt. According to Horatio Eustis of Natchez, the tornado 'demolished entirely the lower town leaving but one house standing there'."

Regarding a final death count, CNN reported "The official death toll may not have included slaves, according to the Federal Emergency Management Agency."

== See also ==
- List of North American tornadoes and tornado outbreaks
- 1846 Grenada, Mississippi tornado
- 1953 Vicksburg tornado
- 1925 Tri-State tornado - deadliest tornado in U.S. history
- Tornado outbreak sequence of December 1–6, 1953
  - 1953 Vicksburg, Mississippi, tornado

== Sources ==
- Ann Beha Associates (1996). Melrose Estate, Natchez National Historical Park, Natchez Mississippi (Report). Historic Structures Report, Vol. 1. Boston, Massachusetts: U.S. National Park Service, Gulf Coast System Support Office. OCLC 1553097968 – via HathiTrust.
- Dunn, Milton (January 1920). Dymond, John (ed.). "History of Natchitoches". The Louisiana Historical Quarterly. 3 (1). New Orleans: Louisiana Historical Society: 26–56. ISSN 0095-5949. OCLC 1782268 – via University of California Libraries, Google, HathiTrust.
- Grazulis, Thomas P. (May 1984). Violent Tornado Climatography, 1880–1982. OSTI (Technical report). NUREG. Washington, D.C.: Nuclear Regulatory Commission. OSTI 7099491. CR-3670.
  - — (November 1990). Significant Tornadoes 1880–1989. Vol. 2. St. Johnsbury, Vermont: The Tornado Project of Environmental Films. ISBN 1-879362-02-3.
  - — (July 1993). Significant Tornadoes 1680–1991: A Chronology and Analysis of Events. St. Johnsbury, Vermont: The Tornado Project of Environmental Films. ISBN 1-879362-03-1.
  - — (2001a). The Tornado: Nature's Ultimate Windstorm. Norman: University of Oklahoma Press. ISBN 978-0-8061-3538-0.
  - — (2001b). F5–F6 Tornadoes. St. Johnsbury, Vermont: The Tornado Project of Environmental Films.

Preceded by New Brunswick, N.J. (1835)	Costliest U.S. tornadoes on record May 7, 1840	Succeeded by Grinnell, Iowa (1882)
