= John Ellis (Mississippi politician) =

Territorial legislator (d. 1808)

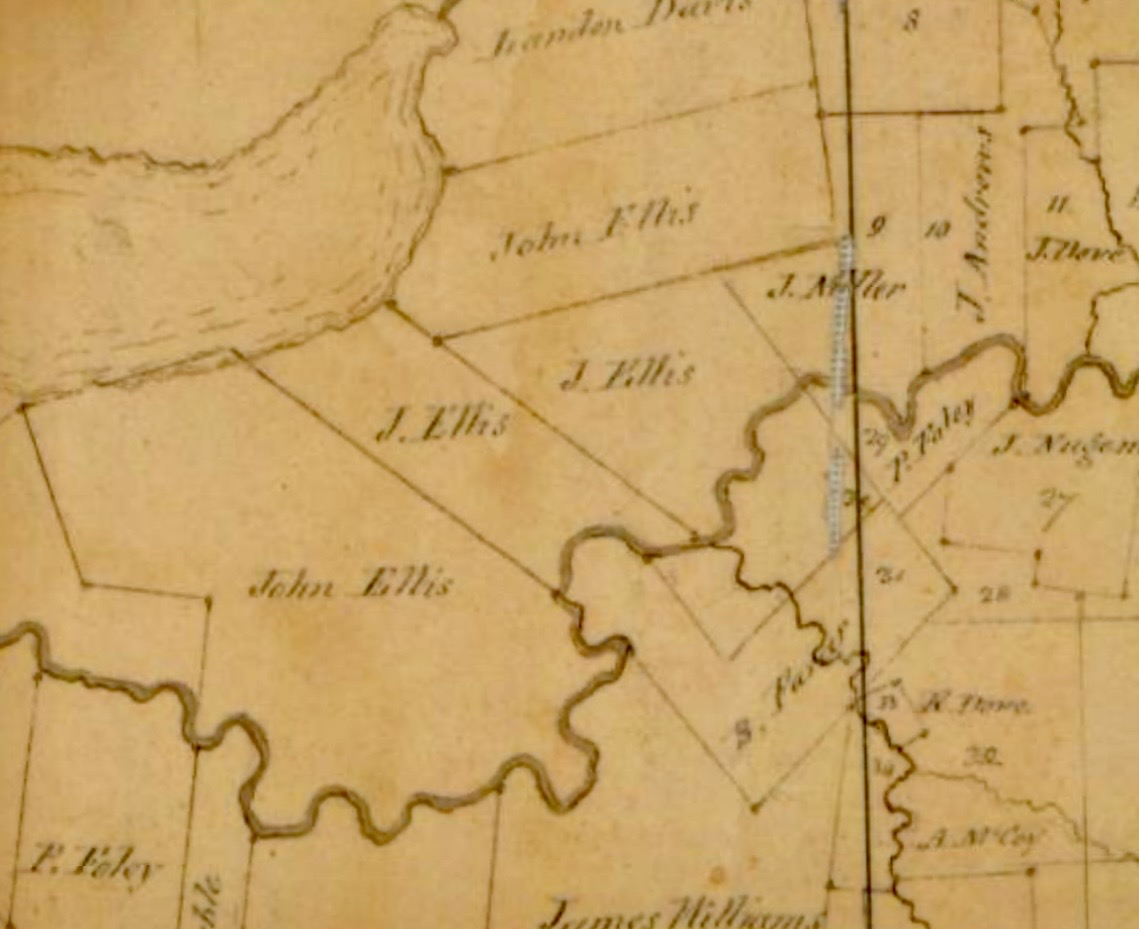
- John Ellis plantations along the Homochitto River, 1810
- Died: November 12, 1808; Mississippi Territory, United States

John L. Ellis (d. November 12, 1808) was a planter and public official in British and Spanish colonial Mississippi and in Mississippi Territory, United States. He was appointed by U.S. president John Adams to the Mississippi legislative council, upper house of the first territorial general assembly, and was elected council president. He later served as speaker of the lower house of the Mississippi territorial assembly.

== Biography ==
John Ellis was a son of early settler Richard Ellis.

According to historian Ethan A. Grant:

A subdued but permanent rivalry existed between the Ellis brothers, (Note: This seems to be erroneous; Richard Ellis was likely father to John Ellis.) particularly John, and Anthony Hutchins. John and Richard Ellis, began on a large scale and grew from there. John arrived at Natchez in June 1773, and in November 1776 received a grant of 1,000 acres. Richard arrived in July 1773, and acquired 3,550 acres on the basis of his family, which included himself, his wife, seven children, and 71 slaves. Richard received further grants of 1,850 and 1,000 acres on June 16, 1779. The Ellis brothers [sic] controlled approximately 20,000 acres at the time of the Spanish conquest.

In February 1785, John Ellis was named a justice of the peace for the ultimately short-lived jurisdiction of Bourbon County, Georgia, along with Nicholas Long, William Davenport, Nathaniel Christmas, Tacitus Gaillard, Sutton Banks, William McIntosh, Benjamin Farar, Cato West, Thomas Marston Green, William Anderson, and Adam Bingaman. In 1787 Ellis and his enslaved farm laborers grew 37,500 lb (17,000 kg) of tobacco, the top yield in the region.

When the Mississippi Territory was organized in 1798, John Ellis was named a captain of foot in the first territorial militia organized by Winthrop Sargent, and later was commissioned a major. In 1800 deed records show that Ellis bought an 800-acre (320 ha) plantation on the Homochitto River from Jesse Carter for US$1,200 (equivalent to $22,765 in 2025). The same year he paid Joseph Panill US$3,000 (equivalent to $56,912 in 2025) for 1,000 acres (400 ha) at Bayou Sara near Baton Rouge.

Ellis was appointed to the territorial legislative council on December 23, 1800 by President Adams. According to a public letter written by former Army officer James Sterrett, around 1800 or 1801 General Wilkinson embezzled public money to buy slaves from a Mr. Jones in Maryland; the slaves were bought on credit by John Ellis, Richard Butler, and others, while "the notes" were held by Abijah Hunt.

He served on the Mississippi territorial legislative council from 1800 to 1803. William Dunbar of Forest plantation wrote to him in his capacity as president of the council in 1802 to advise that "there is no law to authorize that slaves, running away from Spanish territory and taking refuge in free United States Northwest territory, be returned to their owners; fears that the Spanish could retaliate by adopting the same policy to the great harm of the Mississippi Territory and Louisiana; suggests remedy by law." In 1806, Mississippi militia officer John F. Carmichael was court-martialed for disobedience and contemptuous treatment of orders for failing to deliver rifles to John Ellis as dictated by a commanding officer.

He served as Speaker of the House of Representatives of Mississippi Territory from 1806 to 1808. In 1808, Ellis and Joshua Baker, President of the Mississippi Territory Legislative Council signed off a resolution passed by the legislature requesting that territorial representative George Poindexter seek the impeachment of territorial judge Peter Bryan Bruin due to his alleged habitual drunkenness.

Ellis died in Mississippi in November 1808.

== Personal life ==
On December 31, 1799, John Ellis married Sarah Piercy at Natchez. Sarah was the daughter of Charles Percy, a retired British naval officer and Bayou Sara planter.

- Thomas George Ellis, who married Mary Routh, daughter of Job Routh. She was the heir to a grand house called Routhland. They had at least two daughters. After the death of her partner, Mary Ellis Routh married a second time, to General Dahlgren.
  - Thomas and Mary (Routh) Ellis' daughter, Mary Ellis, married René de la Roche, a "West India refugee" and physician of Philadelphia. They had a son, Percy de la Roche, who also became a doctor in Philadelphia.
  - Thomas and Mary (Routh) Ellis' daughter Sarah A. Ellis married Samuel Dorsey.

Ellis was a brother-in-law of Benjamin Farar Jr. who married his sister Mary and Stephen Minor who married his sister Martha. Stephen Duncan was his nephew-in-law by way of marriage to his brother Abram Ellis' daughter Margaret Ellis.

Sarah Percy Ellis remarried to Nathaniel A. Ware, and they had two daughters, Catherine Anne Ware (m. Elisha Warfield, Kentucky plantation owner), and Eleanor Percy Ware (m. Harry, one of the Virginia Lees, lived in Washington County, Mississippi).

== Sources ==
- Brown, Alan (2010). Haunted Natchez. Haunted America. Charleston, South Carolina: Arcadia Publishing. ISBN 978-1-61423-600-9. LCCN 2010028289. OCLC 1545564837.
- Burnett, Edmund Cody (1910). Papers relating to Bourbon County, Georgia, 1785–1786. New York: MacMillan Company. OCLC 49477860 – via HathiTrust.
- David, Elbra Lilli (2018). Commodification, Slavery, Credit and the Law in the Lower Mississippi River Valley, 1780–1830 (Thesis). UC Irvine.
- Din, Gilbert C. (December 1981). "War Clouds on the Mississippi: Spain's 1785 Crisis in West Florida". Florida Historical Quarterly. 60 (1) 6: 51–76 – via ucf.edu.
- Grant, Ethan (1995). "Anthony Hutchins: A Pioneer of the Old Southwest". Florida Historical Quarterly. 74 (4) 4: 405–422.
- Rothstein, Morton (1979). "The Changing Social Networks and Investment Behavior of a Slaveholding Elite in the Ante Bellum South: Some Natchez Nabobs, 1800–1860". In Greenfield, Sidney M.; Strickon, Arnold; Aubey, Robert T. (eds.). Entrepreneurs in Cultural Context. School of American Research, Advanced Seminar Series. Albuquerque: University of New Mexico Press. pp. 65–88. ISBN 978-0-8263-0504-6. LCCN 78021433. OCLC 4859059.
