= Tacitus Gaillard =

American plantation owner (c.1718–1786)

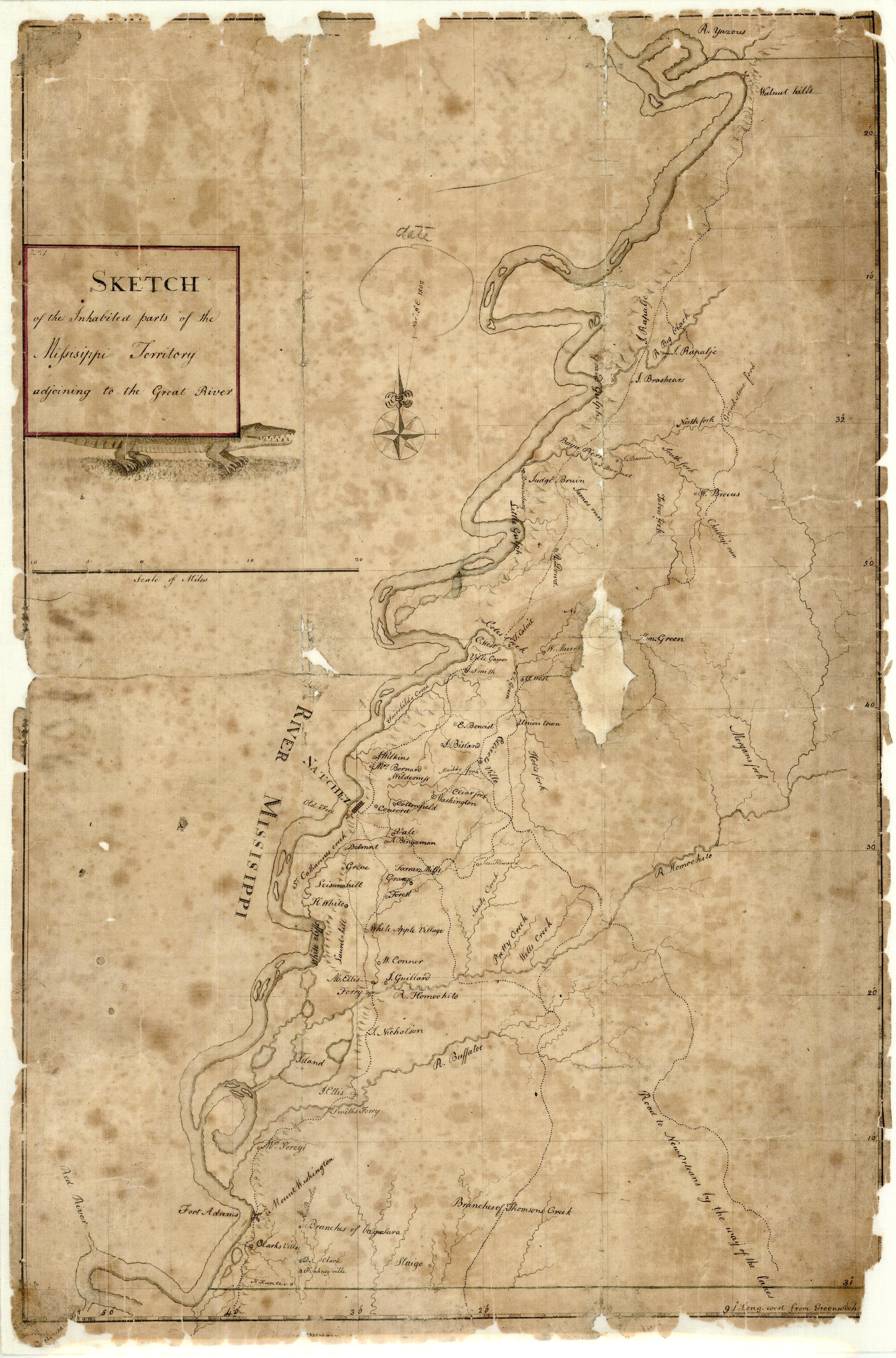
- The American Natchez District, as pictured in a "Sketch of the Inhabited Parts of the Missisippi Territory Adjoining to the Great River", dated November 9, 1802, includes an alligator, and notes the locations of the residences of Gaillard, Ellis, and W. Conner (NAID 191671882)
- Born: Before 1716; Province of South Carolina
- Died: November 1786; Natchez District, British West Florida

Tacitus Gaillard (before 1718–November 1786) was a planter, slave owner, and public official in British Colonial South Carolina, North America. He became one of the first Anglo-American colonists in the Natchez area of the lower Mississippi River valley. He was involved in a failed attempt to assert that the U.S. state of Georgia had jurisdiction over the Natchez District.

== South Carolina career ==
Tacitus Gaillard was part of a family of French Huguenots who arrived in South Carolina in the late 17th century. The largest concentration of French Huguenots in the province outside of Charleston was along the Santee River. According to a study of Huguenot colonists in South Carolina, "Until the Revolution the principal occupation of the settlers was the culture of rice and indigo." Gaillard's parents were Bartholomew Gaillard and Elizabeth Guerry Gaillard. He lived first in the St. James Santee parish, in close proximity to a number of his cousins and kinsmen. He owned a plantation near Eutaw Springs. He was said to have "large land holdings in Ninety-Six District".

In 1741, he pledged £31-6-0 to the construction of "the new chapel of Echaw". He married, sometime before June 1746, Anne LeGrand.

According to a history of Orangeburg County, "Up to 1768, when the Province of South Carolina was divided into districts the townships of Amelia, Orangeburgh and Saxe-Gotha formed parts of Berkeley County, as already stated, and the only civic officers in those townships were the Justices of the Peace, and the Inquirers and Collectors of taxes." Galliard served as a justice of the peace for the county in 1756 and 1762 and 1768–1769. He was a colonel in the "township battalion" for "the region southwest of the Santee, and outside of the old parishes". The battalion was described in 1898 as "frontier mounted police". His militia commission and "commission of the peace" were revoked by the provincial governor, Lord Charles Montagu, in February 1769.

Tacitus Gaillard's wife Anne Gaillard advertised around the same time that she was "sole dealer and separate trader, exclusive and free from any concern with my husband Tacitus Gaillard". He advertised for sale a plantation called Wamhaw, "containing about 500 acres, 200 of which is good river swamp, belonging to Tacitus Gaillard, Esq., situated on Santee river in St. James' parish, on which is a very good dwelling-house and sundry convenient out-houses".

Gaillard was a member of the South Carolina Commons House of Assembly, representing St. James Santee, in 1765. A plan of 1765 to organize a parish of St. Matthew would have benefitted him specifically as one of terms of the organizing act was that "That the new road leading from the ferry of Tacitus Galliard, Esquire, to the road leading from Charlestown to Orangeburgh, shall he, and it is hereby declared to be, a public road, and shall be worked upon and kept in repair by the inhabitants of each parish through which the said road runs, in the same manner as all the other public roads in this Province are..." Tacitus Gaillard and William Thomson were elected to represent the planned St. Matthew parish but "His Majesty having been pleased to Repeal, the Act for establising [sic] St Matthews Parish, Major Gaillard and Collo Thomson quitted their seats in the House the 10th day of November One thousand seven Hundred and sixty-seven." In 1767 he gave the parish church of St. Matthew's a silver cup that remained in the vestry as of 1894.

He may have been trained as a surveyor because in 1767 "the Legislature passed 'An Act for granting to his Majesty the sum of Eighteen Thousand Pounds current money, to be paid for a general survey of this Province, and for appointing commissioners to enter into a written agreement with Tacitus Gaillard, Esq. and Mr. James Cook, for that purpose'. (Stats. of S. C., Vol. IV., p. 262.)" The South Carolina Historical Society holds a 1770 survey map of eastern South Carolina made by Cook and Gaillard. This land later became the Sumter district.

He represented St. George, Dorchester in the assembly in 1768.

He was also a provincial representative from 1772 to 1775, the last legislature under King George III, representing Orangeburg district. Fraud was alleged in the election of 1773; as described by a 20th-century historian:

...Isaac Huger, of Charles Town, and Tacitus Gaillard, both of French lineage, were rival candidates for office in the parish of St. Matthews. Apparently fraud, superinduced by the indignation of an overzealous Huguenot, crept into the election, for in his complaint to the South Carolina Assembly Mr. Huger alleged that public notice of the election according to law was not given; that at 2 p.m. when the box containing the ballots was produced, two of the seals were torn off; that unwarranted methods were used by the friends of Mr. Gaillard to secure his election; that several persons whose votes were refused when they expressed on the first day of the election their favor for Mr. Huger were admitted to the ballot on the second day when they offered their votes to Mr. Gaillard; and that persons under age, and without property, and even several mulattoes were given the franchise.

In 1773, he was seated on a grand jury and helped organize a court of common pleas.

== Slavery in South Carolina ==
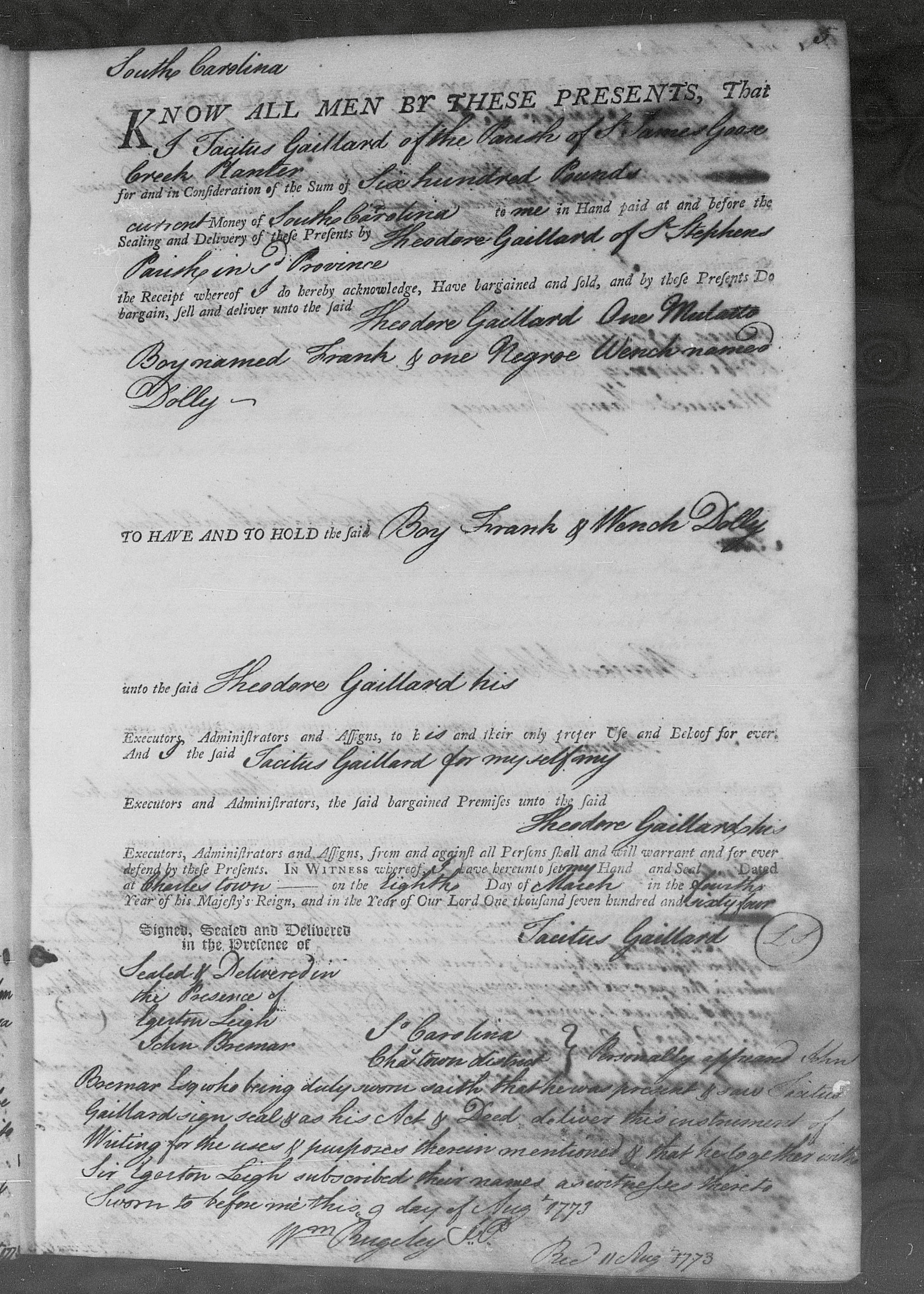
Tacitus Gaillard sold a "mulatto boy Frank and wench Dolly" to his brother Theodore Gaillard at Charleston in March 1764 for £600 "current money of South Carolina"

- In 1756 he advertised for a lost bay horse "taken by a negro boy belonging to me".
- In 1761 he listed for sale nine enslaved people, namely Cain, Isaac, Peter, Jeffrey, Scipio, Philander, Bella, Cuckoose, and Musko Jack, who had been used as collateral for the mortgage of Mrs. Stoutenburgh. The slaves had run away but were apparently traded anyway; Caucuse was still missing months later.
- In July 1762 there was an advertised sale of "twenty choice slaves" to be sold at Tacitus Gaillard's ferry on the Santee River.
- In 1763 he advertised that he had come into possession of a young man named Dick who had once been the property of a man called Allison who lived at Port Royal. Gaillard explained that he had not put Dick in the Charleston workhouse because Dick had never had smallpox, and thus remained susceptible to that infection.
- In 1771 he placed a runaway slave ad.
- In 1772 Tacitus Gaillard, Isaac Gaillard, and Benjamin Farar instructed the public to report all their male slaves aged "Sixteen to Sixty".

== Revolutionary era ==
In February 1775 he was listed as a representative of "Continental Associations". In July 1775 Henry Laurens sent men to the Ninety Six district to recruit for the forthcoming revolution: Judge William Henry Drayton and the Reverend William Tennent "spent several hours at the home of Tacitus Gaillard, the Huguenot leader in St. John's Parish who was a Regulator and member of the House. As the two Associators left Eutaw Springs, they felt satisfied that they had won him over to the principles of Association and Non-importation. Through him they had access as well to his sons-in-law, Dr. Benjamin Farrar in Amelia and Colonel John Savage at Ninety Six." The text of the letter written to the Council of Safety by Drayton and Tennent from Congaree Store, on August 7, 1775: "Gentlemen:-Having left Charles Town on Wednesday morning, we arrived here early on Saturday afternoon, 130 miles distant from town. In our way, we spent some hours at Col. Gaillard's and we flatter ourselves the visit had a good effect. It is to be hoped. He has not delivered himself in public so warmly, as he has expressed himself to us." Gaillard was a representative in the first revolutionary South Carolina congress of 1776, representing Orangeburg district.

On March 8, 1776, Tacitus Gaillard listed for sale his Santee River plantation.

== Migration to Mississippi ==
Gaillard and his son-in-law Dr. Benjamin Farar arrived in British West Florida in 1778. They had traveled up to Pittsburgh and used "five big bateaux equipped with cannon" to transport approximately 35 free whites and 400 to 500 slaves via the Ohio River and the Mississippi River to the Natchez settlement. They were initially suspected of intrigue, and people who encountered them believed they would prefer to settle under a Spanish, rather than British, flag. According to historian Robin F. A. Fabel, "...suspicion lingered. One [reason] was the unwillingness of their leader to take an oath of allegiance to the British crown until he had seen Governor Chester at Pensacola. Another was their background. Tacitus Gaillard had been a member of a rebel provincial congress. Benjamin Farrar, a former deputy surveyor in South Carolina, had been a Son of Liberty. Alexander McIntosh, the Indian commissary who had to entertain them at Natchez, thought it prudent not to insist that they take the allegiance oath there. Governor Chester had heard that the pair were supporters of the popular party in the Carolinas up to the time of the declaration of independence, after which they had turned decisively against the American cause, but he remained uncertain about their ultimate intentions." (Note: According to a historian of the Huguenot colony in South Carolina, after the British captured Charleston in 1780, Tacitus Gaillard allegedly fled South Carolina in company with Rev. Paul Turquand, who "foreseeing the possibility of being apprehended on charges of treason, owing to his Anglican ordination, left his family in charge of friends, and, in company with Tacitus Gaillard, also an ardent patriot, fled to New Orleans. Though eventually both of these men were captured, Turquand was released; his friend Gaillard probably died in prison." Narrator: Tacitus Gaillard did not die in New Orleans prison.) In 1781, a Spanish intendant in Louisiana, Martin Navarro, mentioned Gaillard as an instance of the increasing, and alarming, American presence in the Mississippi River valley. As retold by historian Arthur P. Whitaker, "Navarro reported the rapid growth of Kentucky and of the American settlements at the Illinois, and shipments of American corn down the Mississippi. The Americans were an active, enterprising people, he said, citing by way of illustration the case of a former South Carolinian, Gaillard, who had emigrated from that state to Natchez by way of Pittsburg with his family and slaves, stopping in Kentucky long enough to make a crop for their support. Such energy and resourcefulness, said Navarro, combined with the greedy ambition of the Americans, made them a menace to Mexico. Spain had a remedy, however, for it could strangle the American West by closing its only commercial outlet, the Mississippi."

In February 1785, Gaillard was named a justice of the peace for the ultimately short-lived jurisdictional experiment of Bourbon County, Georgia, along with John Ellis, Nicholas Long, William Davenport, Nathaniel Christmas, Sutton Banks, William McIntosh, Benjamin Farar, Cato West, Thomas Marston Green, William Anderson, and Adam Bingaman. In the words of historian Thomas P. Abernethy, "They were instructed to claim the country for Georgia and to establish her authority, but not to bring on hostilities with Spain—a very large order for any thirteen men."

Gaillard died in Natchez in November 1786. The commandant of a nearby fort traveled to "where his body was found and examined [it] in presence of Don Estevan Minor, Don Joaquim Ossorno, Don Luis Chacheret, interpreter, and inhabitants John Ellis and Abraham Ellis".

== Descendants ==
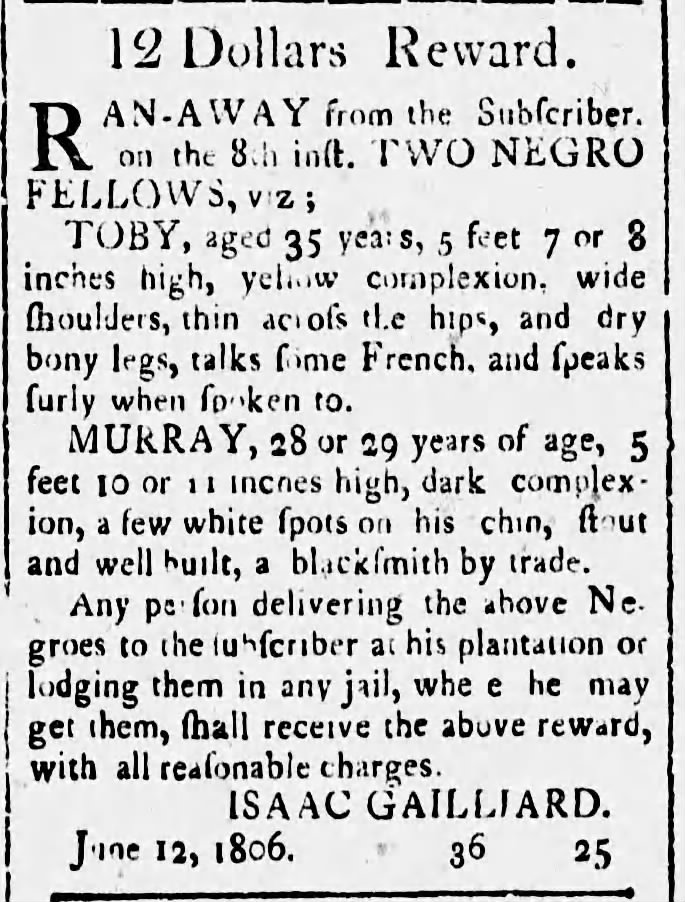
$12 reward for the return of the enslaved men Toby and Murray, offered by Isaac Gaillard (1806)

Anne LeGrand Gaillard died sometime after 1763.

- Tacitus Gaillard, b. 1749, probably died young
- Anne Gaillard, m. 1769, Col. John Savage (d. September 1776)
  - Mary Savage m. William Conner, a speaker of the Mississippi territorial legislature.
  - Anne Savage d. 1791 m. Henry Willis; Willis' second wife was Henry Chotard's stepmother
- Elizabeth Gaillard m. Dr. Benjamin Farar
- Theodore LeGrand Gaillard, died at Fausse Rivière
- Margaret Gaillard, b. March 22, 1758, m. Abraham Ellis, son of Richard Ellis
- Isaac Gaillard, settled near the Homochitto River by 1792

== Sources ==
- Abernethy, Thomas Perkins (1959) [1937]. Western Lands and the American Revolution. Russell & Russell. LCCN 59063139. OCLC 425596. OL 4786029W.
- Bass, Robert D. (1978). Ninety Six, the struggle for the South Carolina back country. Lexington, S.C.: Sandlapper Store. ISBN 978-0-87844-039-9. LCCN 77020551. OCLC 1392383270. OL 6675214W.
- Burnett, Edmund Cody (1910). Papers Relating to Bourbon County, Georgia, 1785–1786. New York: MacMillan Company. OCLC 49477860 – via HathiTrust.
- Din, Gilbert (1981). "War Clouds on the Mississippi: Spain's 1785 Crisis in West Florida". Florida Historical Quarterly. 60 (1) 6 – via library.ucf.edu.
- Fabel, Robin F. A. (1988). The Economy of British West Florida, 1763–1783. Tuscaloosa, Alabama: University of Alabama Press. ISBN 978-0-8173-0312-9. LCCN 86004328. OCLC 13332013.
- Hanahan, Harden Davant (1939). "Early Generations of Gaillard Family". Transactions of the Huguenot Society of South Carolina. 44. Huguenot Society of South Carolina, Charleston. Baltimore: Waverly Press: 36–43. ISSN 0363-3152. OCLC 1641684.
- Hirsch, Arthur Henry (1928). The Huguenots of Colonial South Carolina. Durham, N.C.: Duke University Press. LCCN 28002222. OCLC 2395456. OL 2004585W.
- McBee, May Wilson (1953). The Natchez Court Records, 1767–1805: Abstracts of Early Records. Ann Arbor, Michigan: Edwards Brothers, Inc. – via Internet Archive, digitized from a copy held at the Allen County Public Library Genealogy Center in Fort Wayne, Indiana.
- Rothstein, Morton (1979). "The Changing Social Networks and Investment Behavior of a Slaveholding Elite in the Ante Bellum South: Some Natchez Nabobs, 1800–1860". In Greenfield, Sidney M.; Strickon, Arnold; Aubey, Robert T. (eds.). Entrepreneurs in Cultural Context. School of American Research, Advanced Seminar Series. Albuquerque: University of New Mexico Press. pp. 65–88. ISBN 978-0-8263-0504-6. LCCN 78021433. OCLC 4859059.
- Salley, A. S. Jr. (1898). The History of Orangeburg County, South Carolina. Orangeburg, S.C.: R. L. Berry, printer. LCCN 01010828. OCLC 1311527. OL 16753891W.
- Webber, Mabel L., ed. (July 1916). "Death Notices from the South Carolina and American General Gazette, and Its Continuation, The Royal Gazette, May 1766–June 1782 (continued)" (PDF). The South Carolina Historical and Genealogical Magazine. XVII (3). Baltimore: Williams & Wilkins Company: 121–128.
- Webber, Mabel L. (April 1938). "Gaillard Notes". The South Carolina Historical and Genealogical Magazine. 39 (2). Charleston, S.C.: South Carolina Historical Society: 72–80. ISSN 0148-7825. OCLC 423878007.
- Whitaker, Arthur P. (1927). The Spanish-American Frontier, 1783–1795: The Westward Movement and the Spanish Retreat in the Mississippi Valley. Boston: Houghton Mifflin Co. LCCN 27023368. OCLC 951828. OL 1159732W.
