= Adam Bingaman =

American planter legislator (d. 1819)

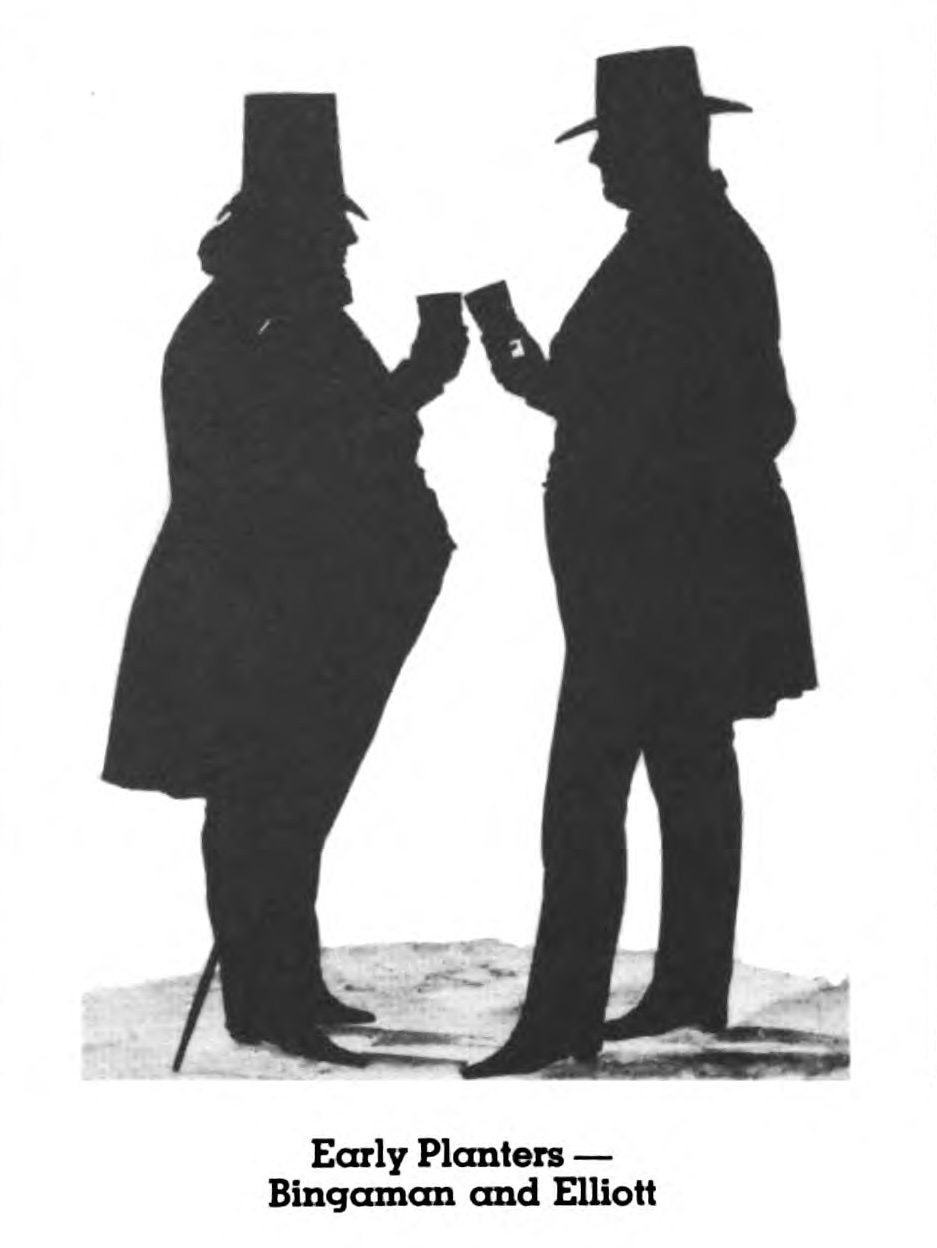
- Cut-paper silhouette, undated
- Born: c. 1767
- Died: September 27, 1819; Mississippi, United States

Adam Bingaman (c. 1767—September 27, 1819), often referred to as Major Bingaman, was an plantation owner and public official in colonial Mississippi and Mississippi Territory in North America.

== Pioneer Bingamans ==
Christian Bingaman I was the son of John Bingaman, who was from a family of Protestants from the German Palatinate who probably moved first to the colony of Pennsylvania and then to the New River valley of Virginia in roughly 1750. According to the "Preston Register" of people killed, wounded, or taken prisoner in the French and Indian War in Augusta County, Virginia, John Bingaman I and his wife, and their son, Christian Bingaman I's brother Adam Bingaman, were killed by the Shawnee (Šaawanwaki) on July 3, 1755. Christian Bingaman I and his brother John Bingaman II both fought with the British in the French and Indian War. Christian Bingaman I married Charity Hollowell in 1764. They moved to the Natchez District of Mississippi, then British West Florida. Their children included Adam Bingaman, Christian Bingaman II, and possibly a daughter named Catherine Bingaman. One of the Christians Bingaman was awarded a 600-acre land grant by the British government on October 11, 1777. Christian Bingaman I died in 1778 in West Feliciana in the present-day state of Louisiana, just down stream on the Mississippi from Natchez.

The Adam Bingaman who was in Mississippi Territory political offices is believed to have been the brother of Catherine Brashears and Christian Bingaman II, who are said to have first settled near Gibsonsport on Bayou Pierre in 1777. They may have lived in the Ohio Country first before coming down the river.

Christian Bingaman II, along with Anthony Hutchins, Thaddeus Lyman, Thomas Lyman, Jacob Blomart, Philip Alston, John Alston, and Jacob Winfrey, was involved in a failed attempt to prevent Spanish takeover of West Florida in 1781. He and allies were part of the rebel force that fled "to the Cumberland settlements in Tennessee". He was later pardoned and permitted to return to the Natchez District. When Spanish loyalists seized the property of one John Blommart, who had been a part of the conspiracy, an Adam Bingaman bought "his home in the town of Natchez at public auction and then sold it to merchant Alexander Moore for $600".

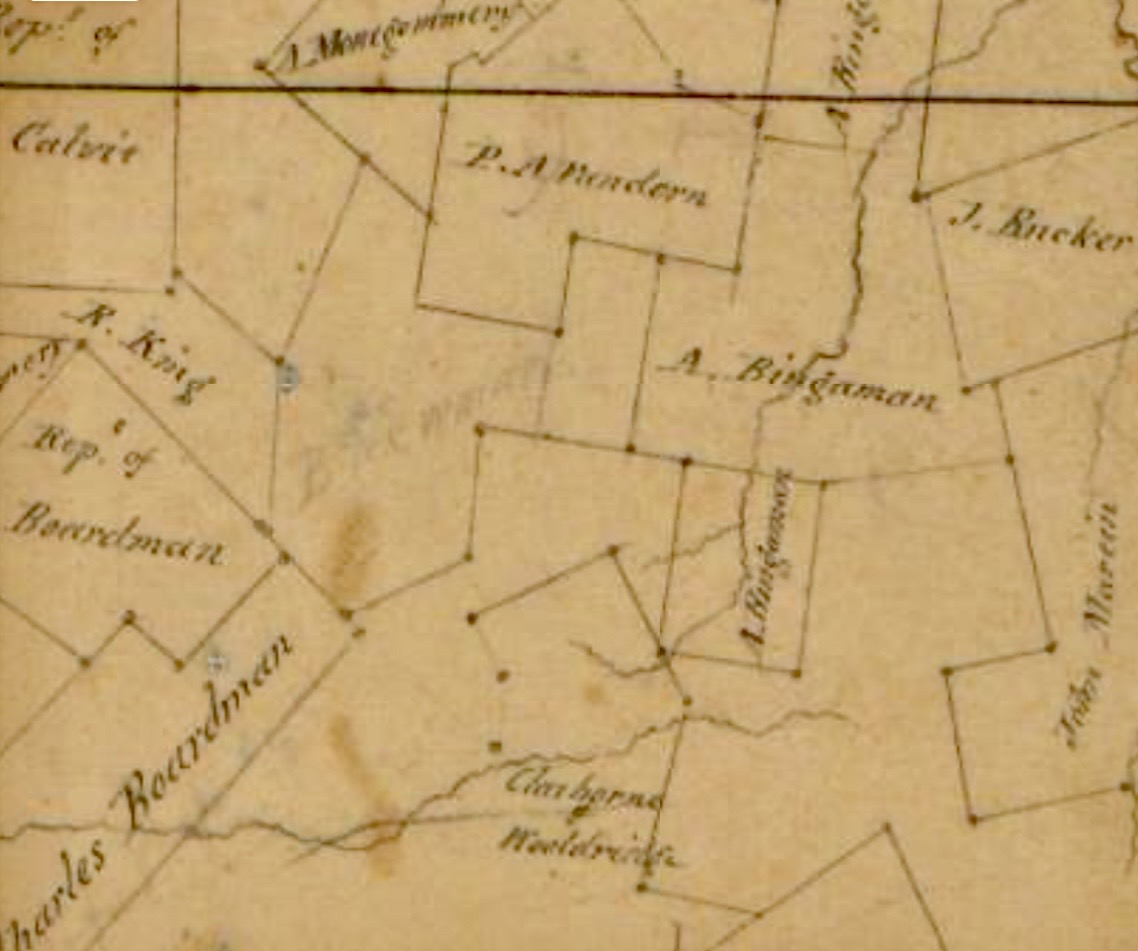
Detail of land holdings in Adams County, Mississippi Territory (1810)

The Bingamans eventually had a plantation near St. Catherine's Creek in Adams County called Fatherland. This plantation was located on the site of what had once been the Grand Village of the Natchez. The Bingamans possibly lived for a time at Bayou Sara in Louisiana. However, according to a descendant, Christian Bingaman II "saw greater opportunities for farming in old Feliciana Parish, La. He made his last move to this area. Christian Bingaman bought a plantation near St. Francisville where he built a home called 'Retreat'."

== Biography ==
Adam Bingaman, possibly Adam Lewis Bingaman Sr., was reportedly born around 1767. In November 1782, Adam Bingaman married Anne Shield McIntosh, the widow of trader Alexander McIntosh. In 1784, he bought a plantation from John Woods. In the 1785 organizing act for Bourbon County, Georgia, the following settlers were named justices of the peace: Tacitus Gaillard, Thomas Green, Sutton Banks, Nicolas Long, William Davenport, Nathaniel Christmas, William McIntosh Jr., Benjamin Farar, Cato West, Thomas Marston Green, William Anderson, Adam Bingaman, and John Ellis. Also in 1785 Francisco Bouligny recommended to Spanish governor Esteban Rodríguez Miró "Don Adam Bingaman, lieutenant of militia" to be captain or commissary "in the bayou of St. Catherine," and Christian Bingaman as one among secondary options.

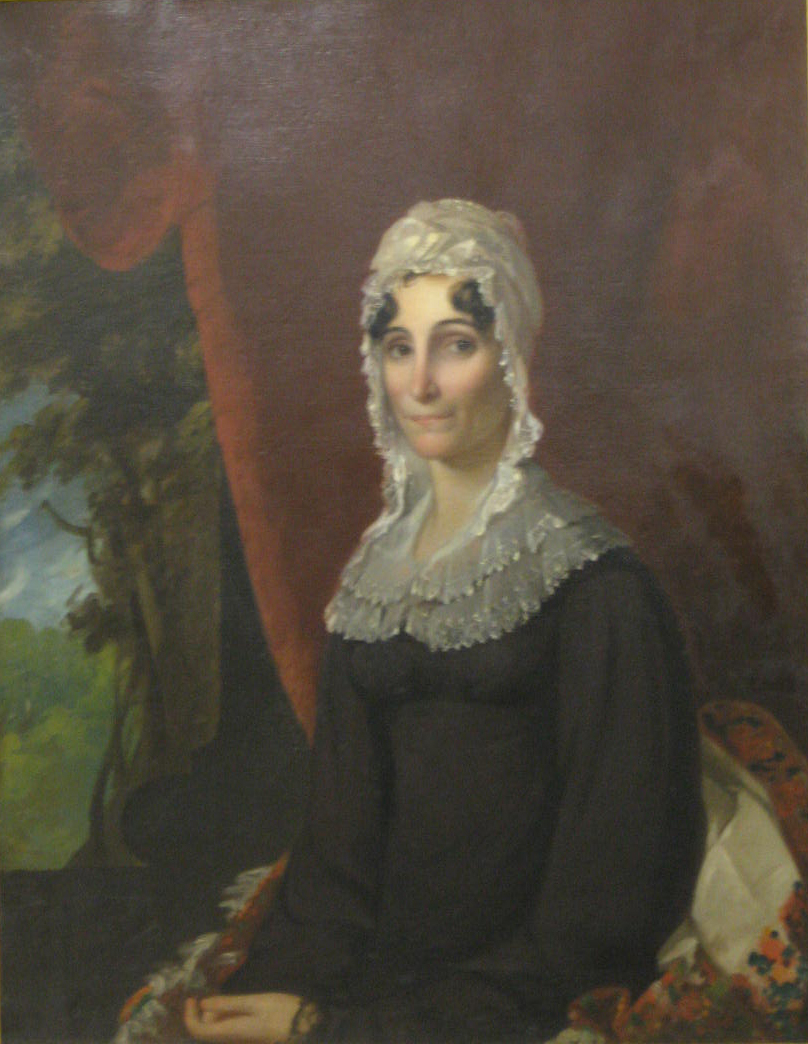
Portrait of Catherine Charlotte Surget Bingaman by William Edward West (1822)

In 1789, along with members of the Green family, Stephen Minor, Manuel Fescada, William Dunbar, Abraham Ellis, and Ebenezer Rees, he joined a militia company organized by Governor Gayoso called Compañía Real Carlos. In the 18th century his plantation land and enslaved labor force produced predominantly tobacco. In 1789 Bingaman's operation yielded 40,000 lb (18,000 kg) of tobacco. Perhaps in the early 1790s he married second Charlotte Catherine Surget, the fourth of 11 children born to Pierre Surget and Catherine Hubbard. The Surgets had arrived in Natchez around 1785.

Bingaman was a trustee of the Natchez Hospital that was organized by George Cochran around 1800. He was appointed to the first Mississippi territorial legislative council, in company with John Ellis, by John Adams. He declined a second appointment by Thomas Jefferson in 1802.

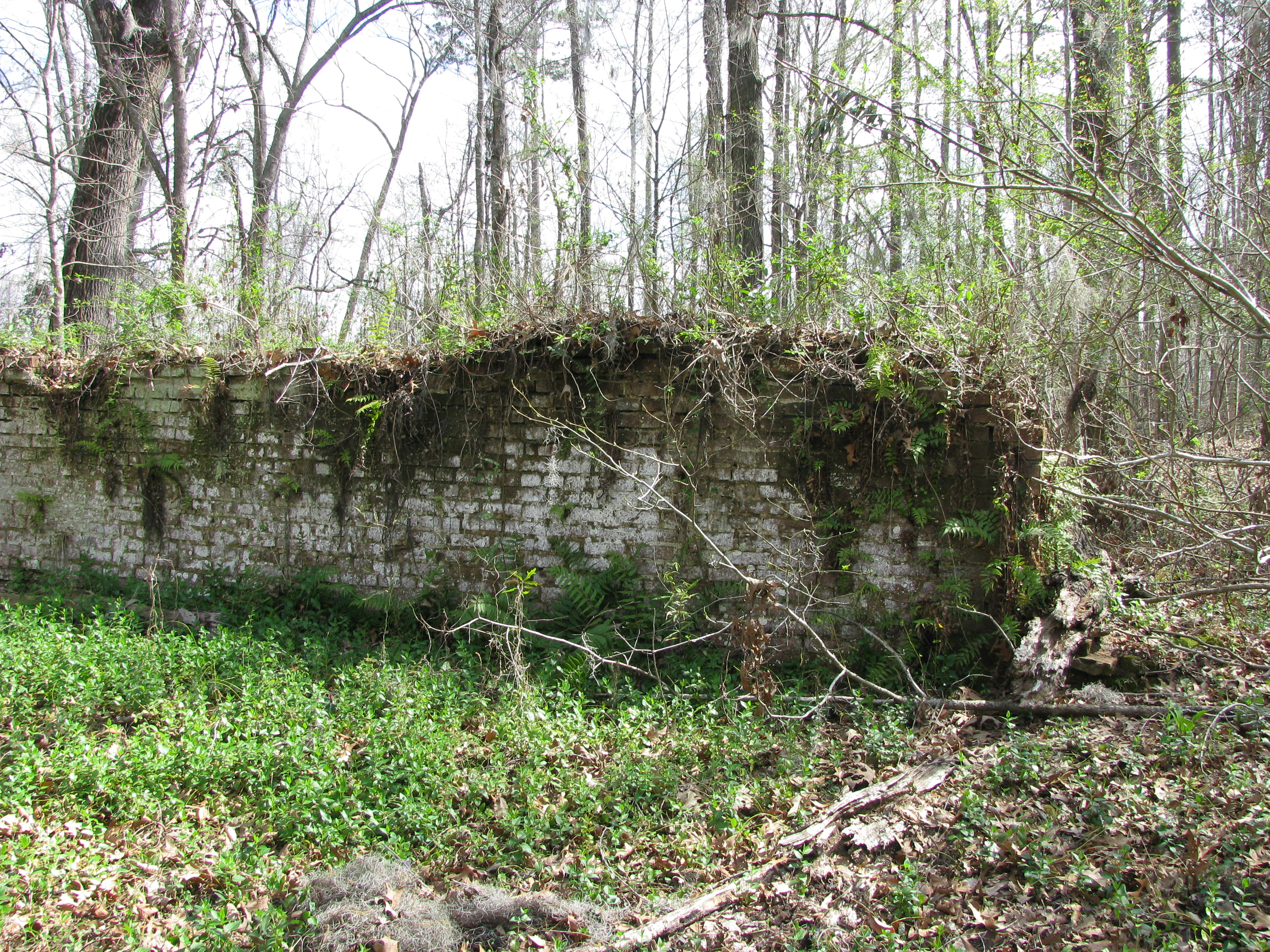
Adam Bingaman is most likely buried at the Bingaman family cemetery near St. Catherine Creek

The Kentucky-native artist William Edward West spent a significant amount of time with the Bingamans and wrote his sister "I could go on talking about them forever." In 1814, "with property assessed at $98.64½ for 4,038 acres and 67 slaves," he was one of the top taxpayers in the Natchez District. Bingaman died September 27, 1819, at his home in Mississippi. The cause of death was yellow fever. He was 52 years old. His widow, C. C. Bingaman, died in 1841.

Between 1837 and 1844, pioneering American antiquarian-archaeologist Montroville Wilson Dickeson excavated burial mounds and caches found on the Bingaman plantation. After A. L. Bingaman's death, ownership of the Bingaman plantation passed to his cousin James Surget. The main house at Fatherland burned down in 1875.

== Descendants ==
- Adam Lewis Bingaman.
- Eliza J. Bingaman m. Dr. Gustavus Calhoun
  - Catharine Maria Calhoun m. Stephen Duncan Marshall, son of Levin R. Marshall
- Anna Maria Bingaman m. John Linton
- Catharine A. Bingaman m. Dr. Stephen Duncan
  - Henry P. Duncan
  - Samuel P. Duncan
  - Stephen Duncan Jr.
  - Charlotte Bingaman m. Samuel Manuel Davis
  - Maria L. Bingaman m. John Julius Pringle
- Charlotte Frances Bingaman m. James Campbell Wilkins
  - Catharine C. Wilkins m. S. S. Boyd
  - Ann B. Wilkins

== See also ==
- William St. John Elliot

== Sources ==
- Agee, Phil (September 2022). Debt-Driven Settlerism: Small Farmers and Bankers in the Trans-Appalachian South, 1800–1820 (M.A. Liberal Studies). City University of New York (CUNY) Graduate Center.
- Bingaman, Sheila M. (2013). "The Early Bingamans in the New River Area". Smithfield Review: Studies in the history of the region west of the Blue Ridge. 17. Blacksburg, Virginia: Smithfield Preston Foundation & Virginia Polytechnic Institute and State University Department of History: 27–42. ISSN 1093-9652.
- Buckner, Timothy Ryan (August 2005). Constructing Identities on the Frontier of Slavery, Natchez, Mississippi, 1760–1860 (Thesis). University of Texas at Austin.
- Burnett, Edmund Cody (1910). Papers relating to Bourbon County, Georgia, 1785–1786. New York: MacMillan Company.
- Culin, Stewart (January 1900). "The Dickeson Collection of American Antiquities". Bulletin of the Free Museum of Science and Art. II (3). University of Pennsylvania: 113–168 – via HathiTrust.
- Gillis, Norman; Gillis, Irene S. (n.d.). Early Inhabitants of the Natchez District. [Per LOC, possibly published 1963]. Shreveport, Louisiana. LCCN 64002728. OCLC 732676231. FHL 153410.
- Mulvihill, Lelia H. (1946). Private Cemeteries in Adams County, Mississippi (Reprint ed.). Salem, Massachusetts: Higginson Book Company.
- Pennington, Estill Curtis (1989). "Aesthetics of Everyday Life in Old Natchez". In Polk, Noel (ed.). Natchez Before 1830. The L.O. Crosby Jr. Memorial Lectures in Mississippi Culture. Jackson: University Press of Mississippi. pp. 109–123. ISBN 978-0-87805-380-3. LCCN 88028046. OCLC 18739746.
- Pinnen, Christian (2021). Complexion of empire in Natchez: race and slavery in the Mississippi borderlands. Early American places. Athens: The University of Georgia Press. ISBN 978-0-8203-5850-5.
- Siebert, Wilbur H. (1916). "The Loyalists in West Florida and the Natchez District". The Mississippi Valley Historical Review. 2 (4): 465–483. doi:10.2307/1886907. ISSN 0161-391X.
