= Fighting Butlers =

Five American soldier brothers

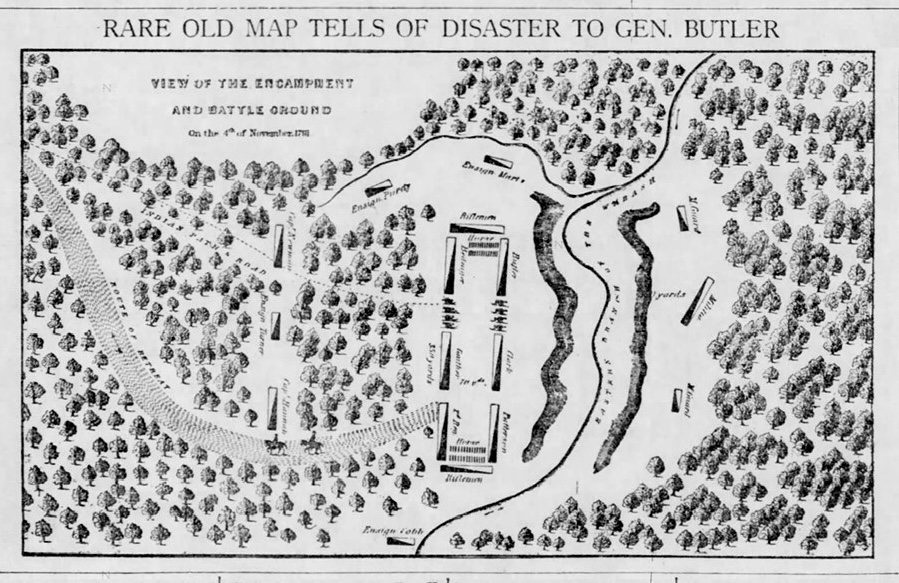
1791 St. Clair's defeat: "Rare old map tells of disaster to Gen. Butler" (mapped by Ebenezer Denny of Pittsburg)

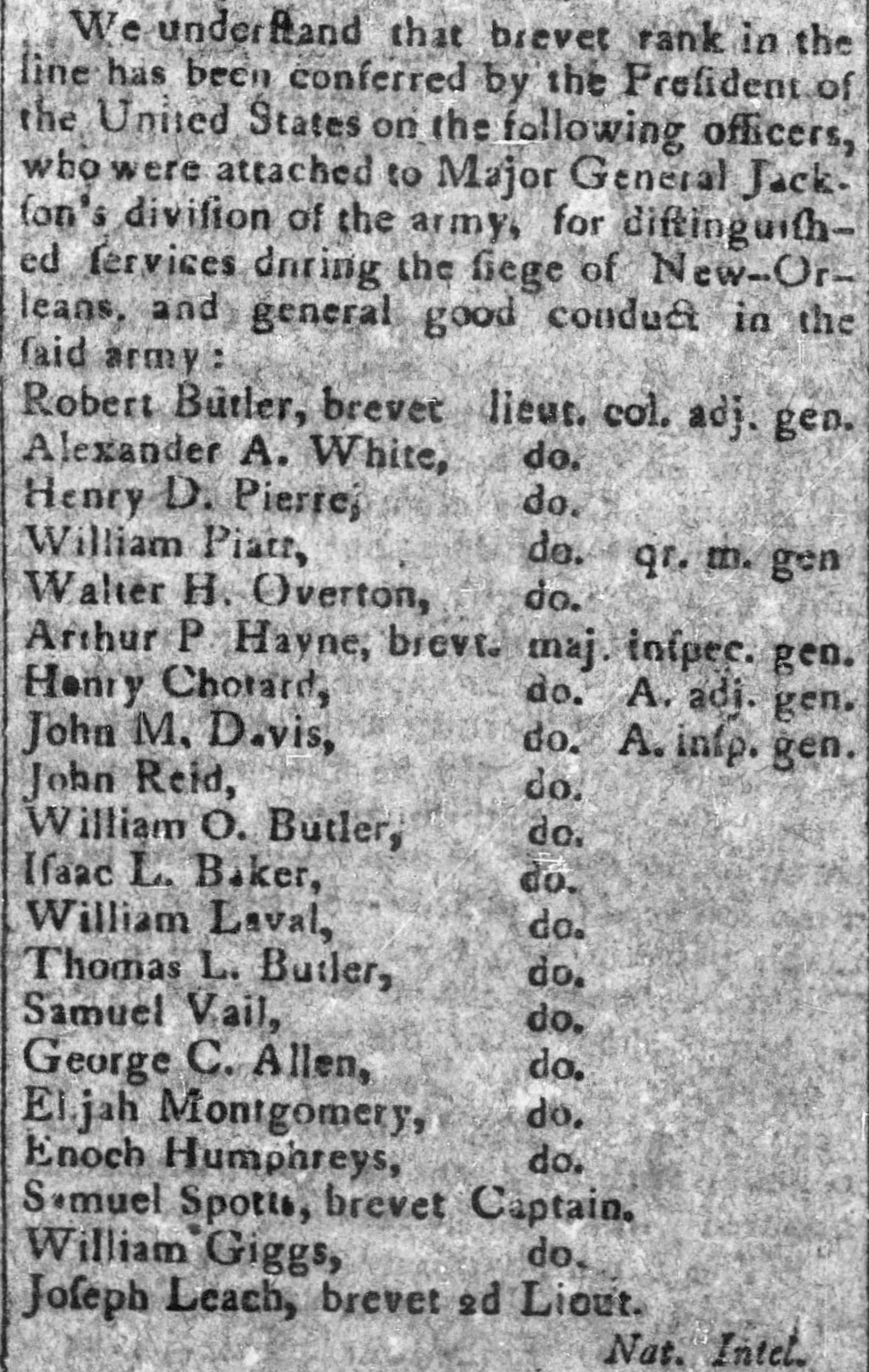
Three sons of the Fighting Butlers were breveted rank for their work as adjutants or inspectors for Andrew Jackson at the battle of New Orleans

The five Fighting Butlers were brothers of Irish extraction who settled in Carlisle, colonial Pennsylvania, and at Fort Pitt, and were involved in the American Revolutionary War, the Battle of the Wabash, and the American settlement of the region surrounding the mouth of the Mississippi River. Editor Francis P. Blair popularized the story of the Fighting Butlers when William O. Butler was a Democratic Party vice-presidential candidate in 1848 with Lewis Cass.

The older three were born in Ireland. The younger two were born in Pennsylvania.

- Richard Butler (1743–1791), killed in the Northwest Indian War
  - Four children with Maria Smith
    - William Butler, U.S. Navy, died during War of 1812
    - Mary Butler m. Isaac Meason
    - James Richard Butler, commanded Pittsburg Blues in War of 1812 m. Ann Elise "Nancy" Wilkins, daughter of General John Wilkins
  - Tamanatha ("Captain Butler") with Nonhelema Hokolesqua
- William Butler (d. 1789), involved in the Battle of Monmouth and Sullivan Expedition
  - Son died in the Navy
  - Son was officer in Wayne's army in 1794
  - Richard Butler (1777–1820) m. Margaret Farar
  - Rebecca Butler m. Samuel McCutchon, 4 children
- Thomas Butler (1748–1805), 2nd Pennsylvania Regiment, severely wounded in the Northwest Indian War
  - Thomas Butler m. Ann Ellis (of Ellis Cliffs, Mississippi), settled in Louisiana, 12 children
  - Robert Butler m. Rachel Hays (a niece of Andrew Jackson), settled in Florida
  - William Edward Butler m. Martha Thompson "Patsy" Hays (a niece of Andrew Jackson), settled in west Tennessee
  - Lydia Butler m. Stockley D. Hays (a nephew of Andrew Jackson)
- Percival Butler (1760–1821), 2nd Pennsylvania Regiment, an adjutant general of Kentucky in the War of 1812 m. Mildred Hawkins ("Percival Butler was born near Carlisle, Pa., April 4, 1760. He was the fourth son. When but slightly over 17 he received his commission as first lieutenant in the Third Regiment of the Pennsylvania Line. He put in that dreary winter at Valley Forge, was at Monmouth and at the capture of Cornwallis. He served under Anthony Wayne until the disbandment of the Continental army. In 1784 he emigrated to Kentucky. In 1812 he was adjutant general of the state and joined a detachment of troops sent from the state in the War of 1812.")
  - Thomas Langford Butler
  - William O. Butler (1791–1880), candidate for Vice President of the United States in 1848
  - Caroline Hawkins Butler m. James Pryor
  - Jane Hawkins Butler m. N. E. Ewing
  - Percival Pierce Butler Jr. (1794–1851), Kentucky state Senator
- Edward Butler (1762–1803), 9th Pennsylvania Regiment and the Northwest Indian War, adjutant general of the U.S. Army
  - Anthony Wayne Butler
  - Caroline Swanwick Butler m. Bell
  - Edward George Washington Butler, married a great-granddaughter of Martha Washington, settled in Louisiana
  - Eliza Eleanor Butler m. John Donelson IV (a nephew of Andrew Jackson)

== See also ==
- Wards of Andrew Jackson
- Donelson family
