= Bourbon County, Georgia =

Dissolved subdivision of Georgia, USA

Coordinates: 31.582693°N 91.249942°W

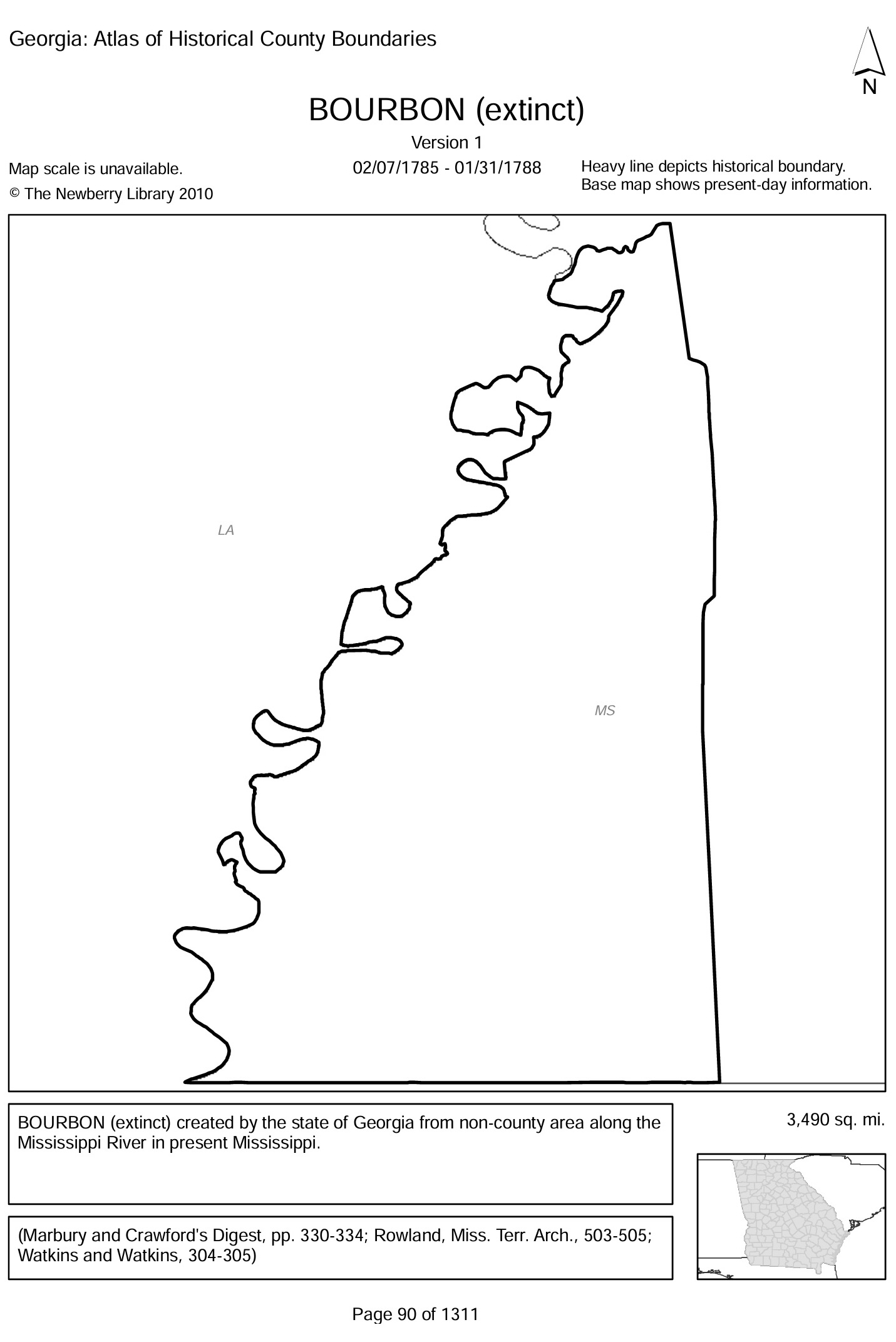
BOURBON County (1785–1788; extinct) created by the U.S. state of Georgia from non-county area along the Mississippi River in present Mississippi (Atlas of U.S. County Boundaries, Newberry Library)

Bourbon County, Georgia was a county of the U.S. state of Georgia from 1785 to 1788 (238 years ago). The county was created by Georgia in 1785 as part of the Yazoo land scandal out of disputed Yazoo lands in present-day Mississippi and was dissolved in 1788 due to pressure from the federal government.

== History ==
In 1785, Georgia Governor George Mathews signed the Bourbon County Act, which organized Bourbon County, Georgia in the area east of the Mississippi River, south of the Yazoo River, east of various Native American lands and the north of the 31 degree parallel of latitude. At this time the western boundary of the State of Georgia was at the Mississippi River (per the 1763 Treaty of Paris). This area included part of the Natchez area and was also in part of an area that was also claimed by Spain. Bourbon County was created on February 7, 1785.

Thomas Green attempted to assemble and organize Bourbon County, but Spanish authorities resisted his efforts to occupy the territory due to the fact that the county occupied area also claimed by Spain.

The State of Georgia appointed civil and judicial officers for the new county, but under pressure from the federal government, the Georgia General Assembly repealed the act creating Bourbon County on February 1, 1788, with the intent to reduce diplomatic tensions with Spain. The federal government opposed the existence of Bourbon County because of the unresolved Spanish claim, and because claims to the area by the Choctaw and Chickasaw Native American tribes had existed previously.

It was believed that Bourbon County was named for the House of Bourbon, the European royal dynasty.

== Officers ==
In the 1785 organizing act, the following settlers were named justices of the peace: Tacitus Gaillard, Thomas Green, Sutton Banks, Nicolas Long, William Davenport, Nathaniel Christmas, William McIntosh Jr., Benjamin Farar, Cato West, Thomas Marston Green, William Anderson, Adam Bingaman, and John Ellis. Abner Green was designated register of probate.

== See also ==
- List of counties in Georgia
- Bourbon County, Kansas
- Bourbon County, Kentucky

== Sources ==
- Burnett, Edmund Cody (1910). Papers relating to Bourbon County, Georgia, 1785–1786. New York: MacMillan Company.
