= Richard Ellis Butler =

American planter and military officer (1777–1820)

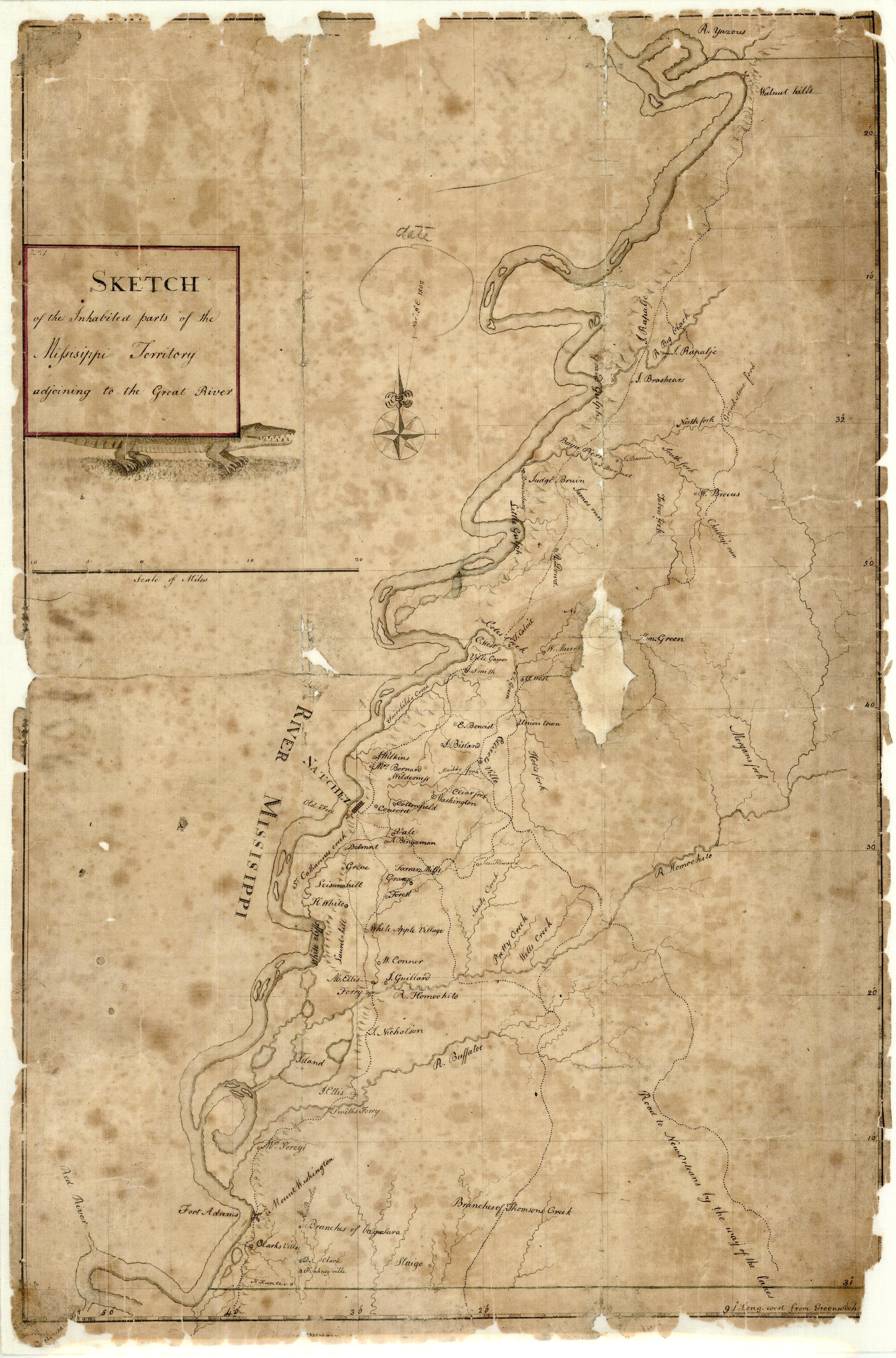
The American Natchez District, as pictured in a "Sketch of the Inhabited Parts of the Missisippi Territory Adjoining to the Great River", dated November 9, 1802, included an alligator, and the residences of D. Clark and R. Butler (NAID 191671882)

Richard Ellis Butler (1777–October 5, 1820) was an American soldier and plantation owner, son of William Butler of the so-called Fighting Butlers. His papers are held at Louisiana State University.

== Biography ==
Like his father before him, Richard Butler also became an officer of the United States Army. In 1798 Butler traveled the Ohio and Mississippi Rivers to deliver dispatches to Isaac Guion. He married Margaret Farar in 1799. Margaret Farar (called Marguerite in Louisiana records) was the daughter of Benjamin Farar Sr. and Elizabeth Gaillard. Her father had died in 1790, and her legal guardian was Julien Poydras.

Butler settled in the lower Mississippi River valley after he retired from the service. According to a former U.S. Army officer named James Sterrett, writing in 1811, around 1800 or 1801 General James Wilkinson had embezzled public money to buy slaves from a Mr. Jones in Maryland; the slaves were bought on credit by John Ellis, Richard Butler, and others, while "the notes" were held by Abijah Hunt.

Ormond, on the east bank of the Mississippi near Destrehan (Carl Mydans, Farm Security Administration, c. 1941)

In 1805, the couple "purchased Ormond Plantation, in German Coast County (St. Charles Parish), from the widow of Pierre Trepagnier. At Ormond, named for the Irish family seat of one of his ancestors, he planted sugar." Butler's uncle Thomas Butler died at Richard Butler's "farm near New-Orleans" in 1805. His wife's guardian Poydras lent Butler "large sums of money" and in 1806, "Poydras' loans paid off when Butler's plantation made $15,000 in sugar profits."

The couple had lived at Woodstock near Pinckneyville, Mississippi. Their plantation there was bordered on the east by that of William Yerby. The Butlers also owned a house built in 1817 by architect Henry S. Latrobe on Royal Street in New Orleans. Also in 1817, Andrew Jackson's famous horse Truxton was shipped to Richard Butler to live out his retirement.

Col. Butler, as he was called, died with his wife at Bay St. Louis during a yellow fever outbreak. He died first. His sister and her husband inherited the New Orleans house.

His obituary stated, "The subject of this notice was educated at Carlisle, and entered into the army upon completing his collegiate course. He was actively employed in the campaigns against the Indians which preceded the treaty of Greenville, and he continued in service till 1801. Having then married, and seeing his country in the enjoyment of a repose not likely to be soon disturbed, he retired from the army, at the age of 24, with the rank of Captain. Since 1801, he has been extensively and successfully engaged in the cultivation of the soil, as a sugar planter in Louisiana, and a cotton planter in Mississippi."

== See also ==
- Thomas Butler (Louisiana politician), his cousin

== Sources ==
- Russell, Sarah (1999). "Ethnicity, Commerce, and Community on Lower Louisiana's Plantation Frontier, 1803–1828". Louisiana History: The Journal of the Louisiana Historical Association. 40 (4). Louisiana Historical Association: 389–405 [399]. ISSN 0024-6816.
