= Abner Green =

American planter (died before 1827)

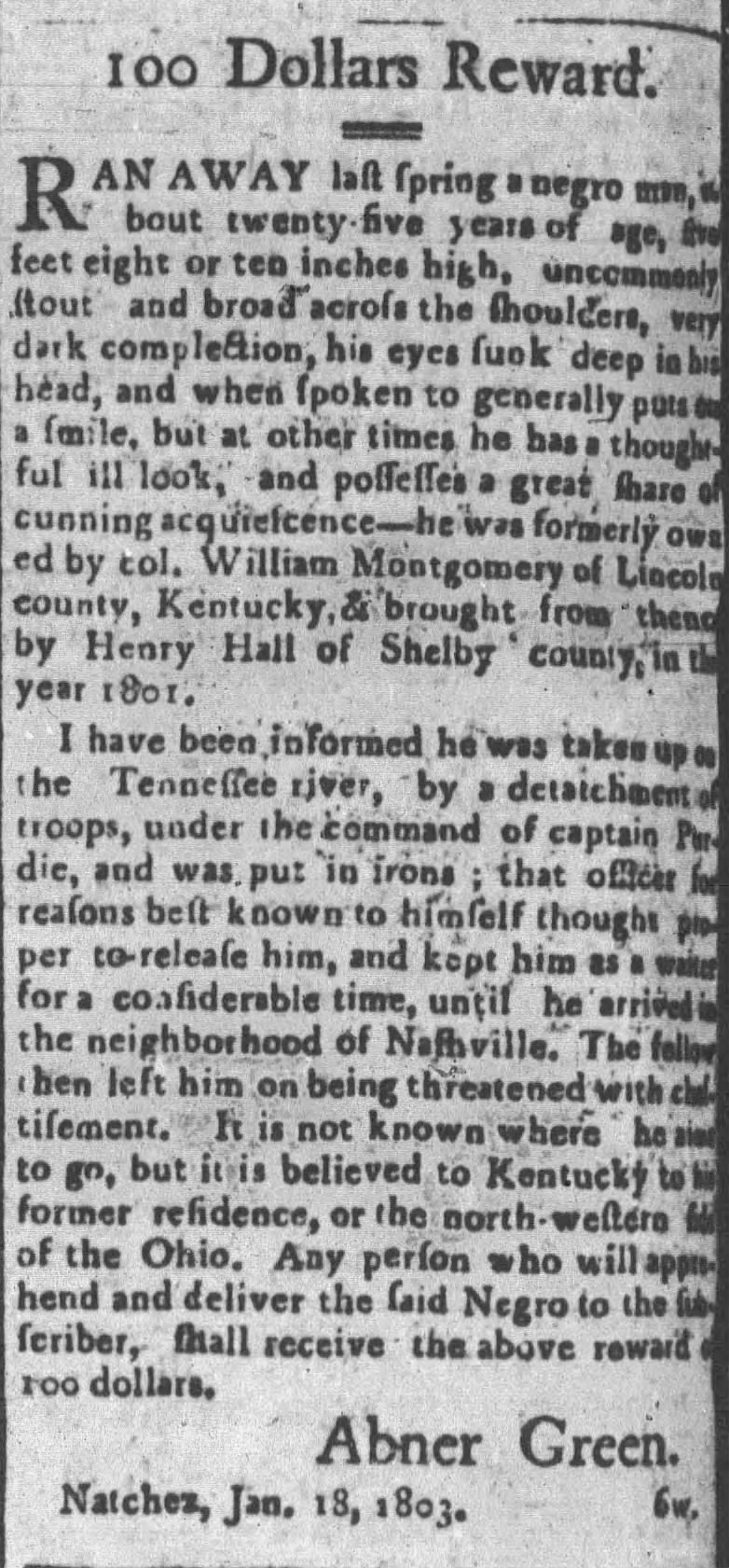
$100 Reward, Abner Green, Natchez, The Western Spy, and Miami Gazette, March 9, 1803

Abner Green (b. 1762 – d. bef. 1817) was a wealthy planter of the Natchez District in West Florida, later Mississippi, United States. He was appointed treasurer of Mississippi Territory in 1802 and served until 1804.

== Biography ==
Abner Green was reportedly born January 21, 1762 in James City County, Virginia, the son of Thomas Marston Green Sr. Green was in the Natchez district by 1784 when he sold a man and woman, both 50 years of age, to Richard Harrison for $490. In 1785 he was named register of probate in the organizing act of the short-lived Mississippi River-adjacent jurisdiction known as Bourbon County, Georgia. In 1787 he and his brother Thomas M. Green Jr. bought 11 slaves, some native to Jamaica and Africa, from Daniel Clark for $6,050.

In March 1801, a traveler on the River recorded that he went "...out to Abner Greens with his father Col. Thomas Green; stayed all night; Green has a fine farm is very rich. Thursday 23d; After breakfast went to old Col. Hutchins. The Colonel returned with me to Mr. Greens to dinner; Greens wife is Hutchins daughter: in the evening returned to Col. Hutchins and stayed all night; spent the time very agreable, a fine Old Lady 3 daughters. At this farm the Old Gentleman has a very extensive stock of every kind; I saw near 300 calves the best garden I ever saw anywhere; George Bell the Barber came to stay with us. Friday 24th; After breakfast we came to Natchez; Old Col. Green myself called at Major Bingamans stayed to dinner; very kind people..." Anthony Hutchins, the father of Abner Green's wife Mary Hutchins, was an important figure in the politics of colonial Mississippi. Another Hutchins sister, Magdaline Hutchins, was married to local planter and merchant Ferdinand L. Claiborne.

He served as the treasurer of Mississippi Territory from about 1802 to 1804, having been appointed by William C. C. Claiborne sometime before April 1802. His plantation may have been called Rural Grove. A traveler of 1808 described him as having one of the most "conspicuous" plantations in the vicinity of Natchez, and recorded that "I had now come twelve miles, and it being excessively hot, I stopped at Mr. Green's to request some fodder for my horse, to which Mr. Green obligingly added an invitation to dinner to myself. After dinner, Mr. Green invited me to look at his garden, which was very spacious, and well stocked with useful vegetables, and understanding that I had been in the West Indian islands, he made me observe some ginger in a thriving state, and the cullaloo or Indian kail, also some very fine plants of Guinea grass, which he proposes propagating." Abner Green lived near Second Creek, on a plantation called the Grange. According to one of his sons-in-law, Abner Green was one of the planters to whom future president Andrew Jackson sold slaves.

In his will dictated in 1809, he arranged for the manumission of "Betito and his wife Bess" bequeathing them $700 as well as "cows + calves, three breeding sows, two good work creatures, one yoke of oxen, and one hundred pounds of bacon, fifty pounds of sugar and coffee, and twenty acres of land." Green helped organize the Bank of the Mississippi in 1810. Also in 1810, Green's son Thomas H. Green was murdered by two men they had enslaved. Two slaves were convicted of the crime and executed April 23, 1810, at Washington, Mississippi Territory.

== See also ==
- Thomas M. Green Sr.
- Greenville, Mississippi
- Old Greenville, Mississippi
- Cato West
- Thomas Hinds
