= Benjamin Farar =

Benjamin Farar may refer to:

- Benjamin Farar Sr. (died 1790), also known as Dr. Farar, American settler and public official
- Benjamin Farar Jr. (1773–1825), also known as Capt. Farar, American plantation owner and militia officer
