= William Conner (Mississippi politician) =

Planter, legislator (c.1771–1814)

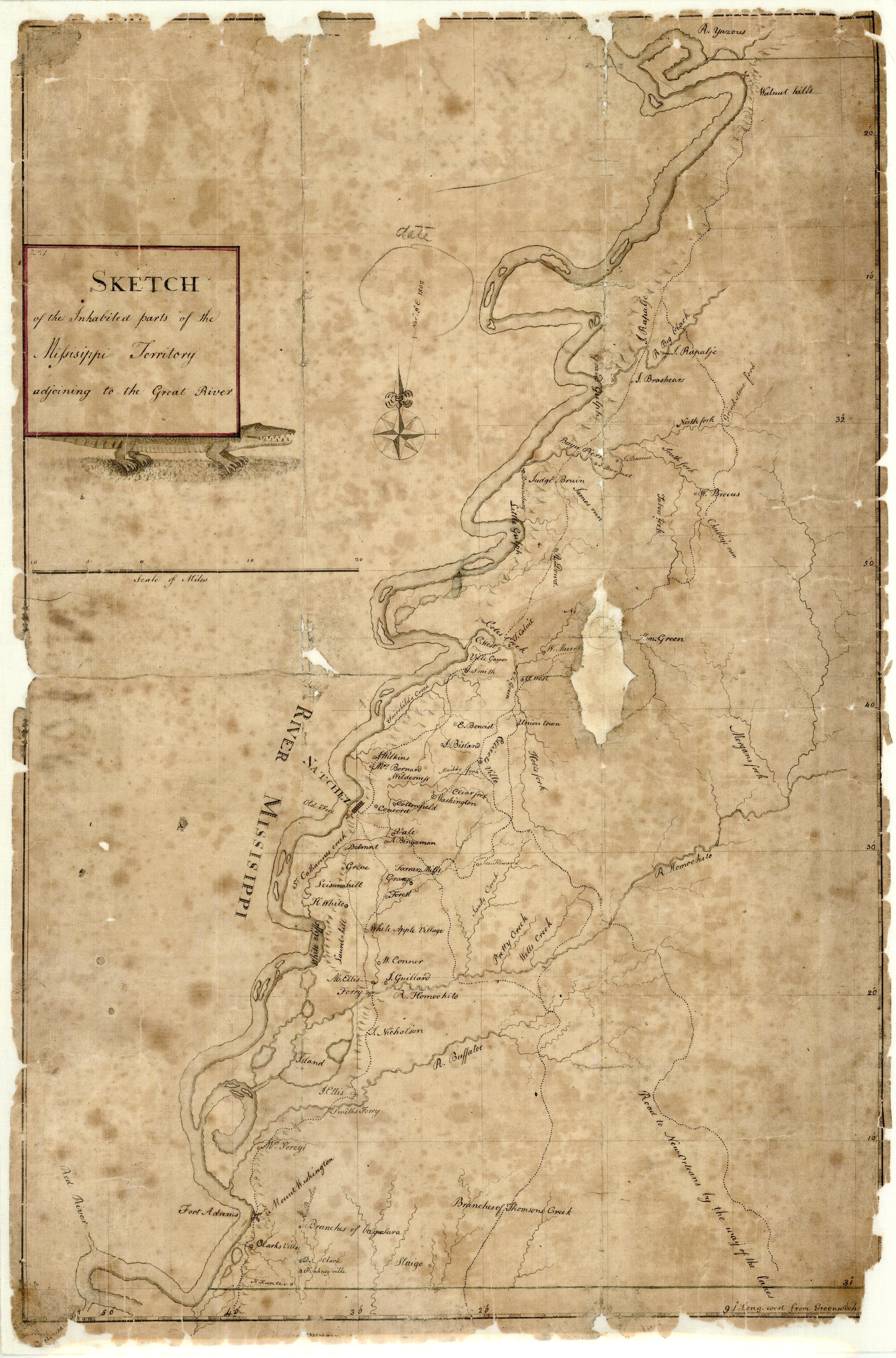
The American Natchez District, as pictured in a "Sketch of the Inhabited Parts of the Missisippi Territory Adjoining to the Great River", dated November 9, 1802, included an alligator and the location of the residence of W. Conner (NAID 191671882)

William Conner (c. 1771–December 19, 1814) was a planter and the speaker of the Mississippi Territory House of Representatives in 1803. His ancestors were settlers in Virginia. He was married to Mary Savage, a granddaughter of pioneering Mississippi colonist Tacitus Gaillard of South Carolina. Conner and his wife moved to the Natchez District in about 1790 or 1791. This was reportedly shortly after their marriage, and once they arrived they "...were domiciled at Oakhill, a part of the Spanish grant to Tacitus Gaillard, just across the creek from Beau Pres. Later they resided at Berkeley, a grand house having been built by [his mother-in-law] Anne Savage, and there they reared a large family of children. William Conner was elected to the first territorial legislature...but political life not suiting his trend of mind, he soon retired from this position and followed his scholarly bent, finding in classical literature and the studies that his own library afforded him all that made life happy and interesting to his high mental calibre. He and his wife were buried in the family graveyard at Berkeley, and on their marble tomb are two wonderful busts of them, sculptured, in Italy." He had a plantation along the Homochitto River. He also had business connections to the Northeast United States through his wife's family.

== Personal life ==
William Conner and Mary Savage had "several" children. As of 1946, there were four visible headstones in the walled Conner family cemetery, located "about 17 miles from Natchez on Lower Woodville Road."

- William Carmichael Conner (c. 1798–1843) m. Jane Elizabeth Boyd Gustine (b. Carlisle, Pennsylvania) He was a wealthy planter in Natchez, and his wife purchased Linden after his death. His descendants still own this house.
  - Lemuel P. Conner m. Mary Frances Turner, daughter of judge Edward Turner; parents of 10 children including judge Lemuel P. Conner Jr.
  - Farar B. Conner m1. Mary McMurran (a daughter of John T. McMurran), m2. Marie Chotard (a daughter of Henry Chotard)
  - Richard E. Conner
  - Margaret Conner m. William T. Martin
  - Annie E. Conner m. Dr. Bisland
  - Mary D. Conner m. T. C. Witherspoon
- Henry LeGrand Conner (January 19, 1803–January 19, 1849) m. Sarah Baker, daughter of Joshua Baker; Henry L. Conner legally owned "about one hundred and nine negro slaves" at the time of his death
- Anne Frances Conner m1. Egbert H. Bell, m2. William Hopper Ruffin, m3. William St. John Elliot

== Sources ==
- n.a. [Goodspeed] (1891). Biographical and Historical Memoirs of Mississippi: Embracing an Authentic and Comprehensive Account of the Chief Events in the History of the State and a Record of the Lives of Many of the Most Worthy and Illustrious Families and Individuals. Goodspeed. pp. 580–582.
- Ann Beha Associates (1996). Melrose Estate, Natchez National Historical Park, Natchez Mississippi (Report). Historic Structures Report, Vol. 1. Boston, Massachusetts: U.S. National Park Service, Gulf Coast System Support Office. OCLC 1553097968 – via HathiTrust.
- Mulvihill, Lelia H. (1946). Private Cemeteries in Adams County, Mississippi (Reprint ed.). Salem, Massachusetts: Higginson Book Company.
