= Linden (Natchez, Mississippi) =

Historic house in Mississippi, United States

- U.S. National Register of Historic Places
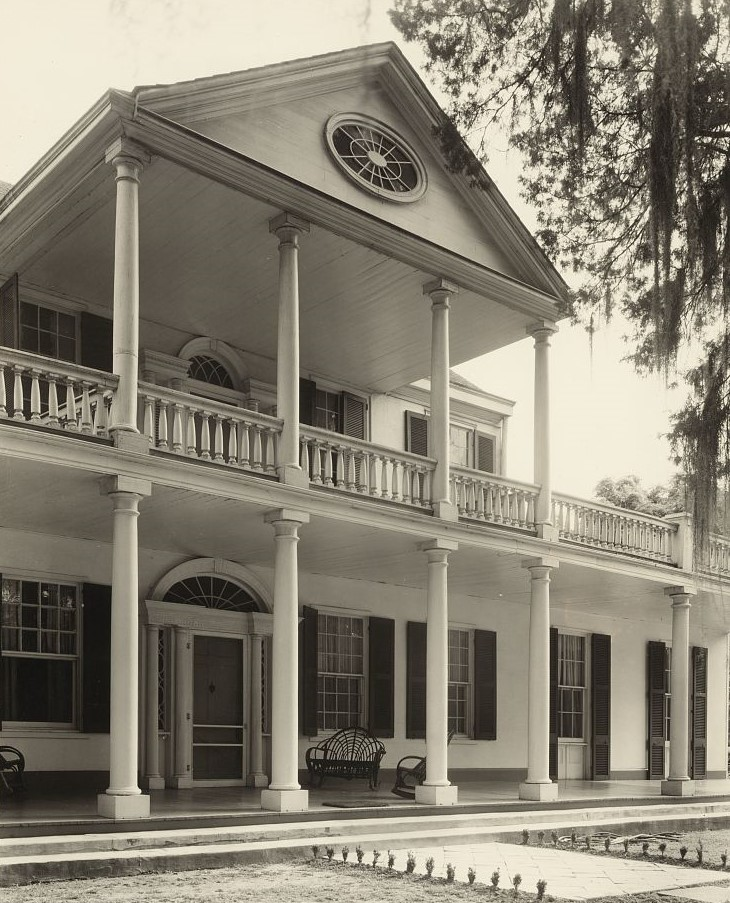
- Linden, by Frances Benjamin Johnston, 1938

- Location within Mississippi Location within the United States
- Interactive map showing the location of Linden
- Location: 1 Linden Pl., Natchez, Mississippi
- Coordinates: 31°33′4″N 91°23′1″W
- Area: 1.5 acres (0.61 ha)
- Built: 1785
- Architectural style: Federal
- NRHP reference No.: 78001582
- Added to NRHP: September 1, 1978

Linden is a historic mansion in Natchez, Mississippi.

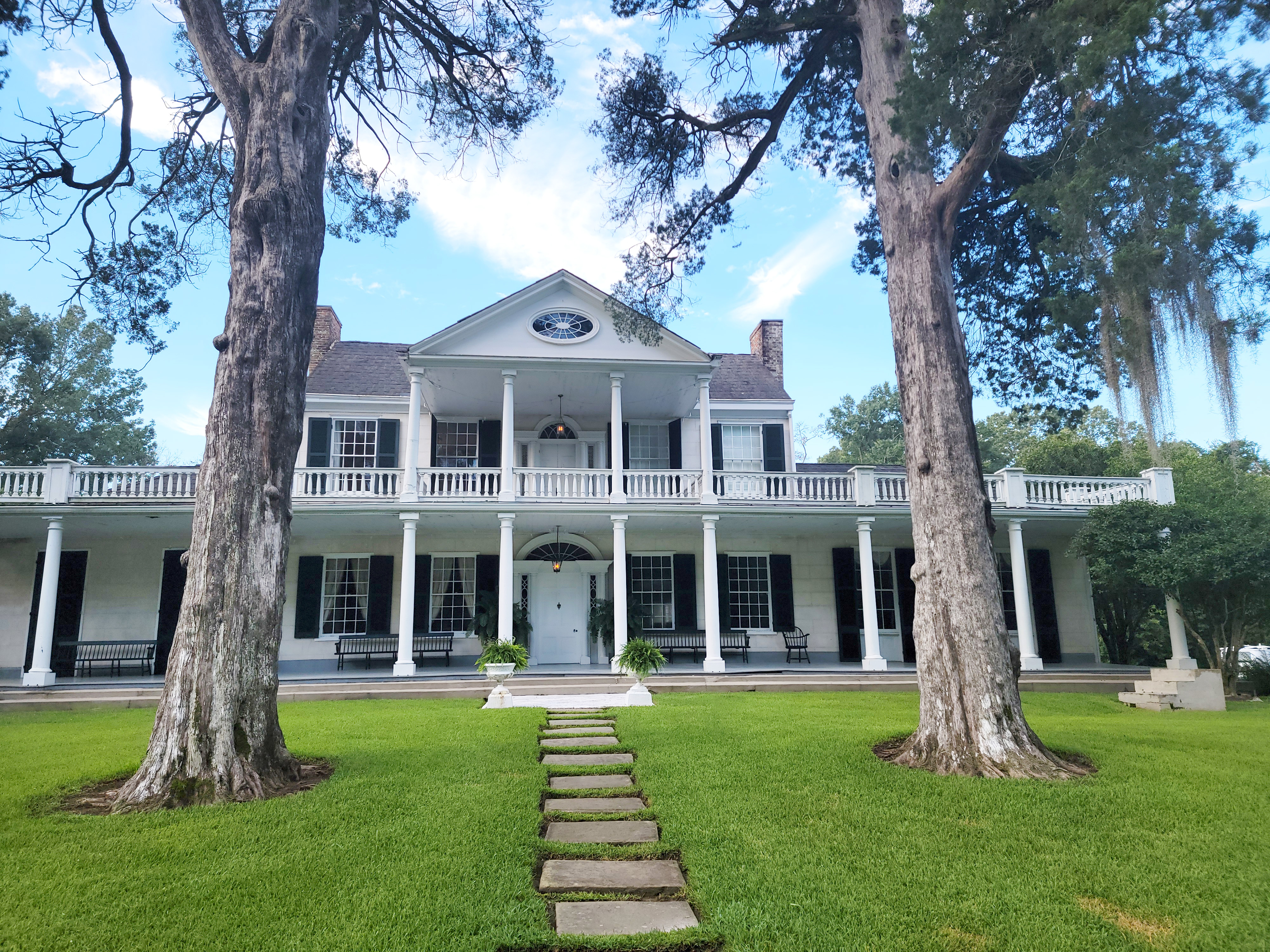
Linden in the present day

== Location ==
It is located at 1 Conner Circle in Natchez, Adams County, Mississippi, about a mile and a half from downtown Natchez.

== History ==
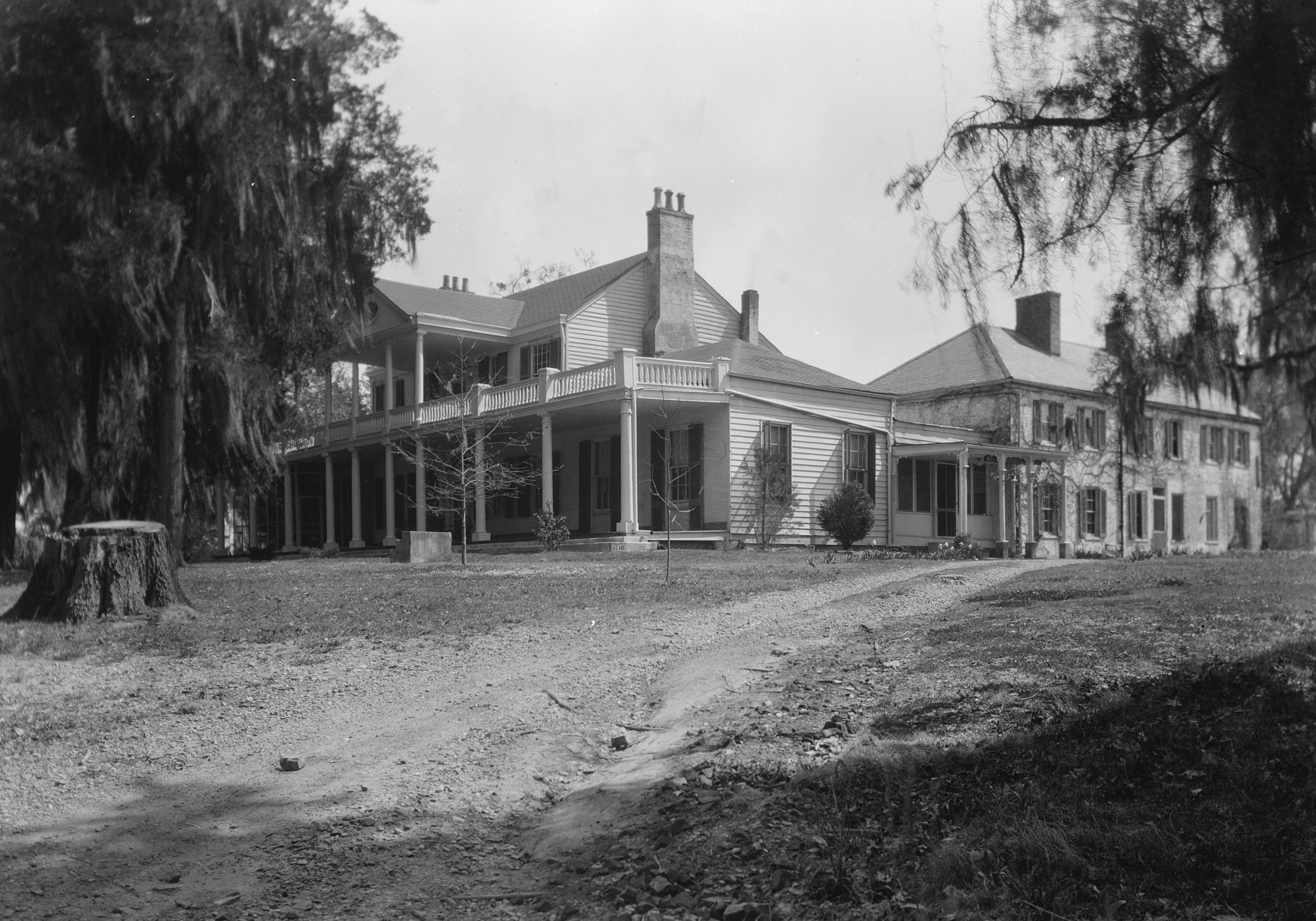
Linden in 1934

Originally owned by Alexander Moore and passed down to his son, James Moore, the central two-story, 4-room section of the mansion was constructed in 1785, and known as “Oaklands”, with records dating back to 1790.

In 1818, the United States Senator and former Attorney General of Mississippi, Thomas Buck Reed, purchased the property from Moore and renamed it “Reedland”. Senator Reed made his mark on the house by adding the stunning frontispiece to the doorway as well as the existing East wing. Thomas Buck Reed (1787–1829) served as the United States Senator from Mississippi from January 28, 1826, to March 4, 1827, and again from March 4, 1829, to November 26, 1829.

Shortly before his death, which occurred while en route to take his seat in Washington D.C., Senator Reed sold the residence to Dr. John Ker (1789–1850) in 1829, another plantation owner. Having moved to Natchez after President Thomas Jefferson appointed Ker’s father to the Supreme Court of Mississippi, Dr. John Ker became a prominent physician and planter in the area. Once Ker attained ownership, he changed the name to “Linden”, being the national tree of Germany. Ker also left his mark on the mansion by adding the living room wing and the ninety-eight-foot front gallery. With these additions, Linden's facade reached its present form.

Shortly after Dr. Ker died, a wealthy widow, Jane Gustine Conner, bought Linden in 1849 for her and her ten children. She purchased Linden to be closer to town. Conner was the daughter-in-law of William Conner, a speaker of the Mississippi Territory General Assembly. Her husband, William Carmichael Conner, was a planter in Natchez. In 1850, Mrs. Conner planted the Cedar trees directly in front of the house and is responsible for the addition of our west wing which housed not only a new kitchen, but also her own laundry room. She added a two-story brick wing, which housed a classroom for her children.

The current owner is the 6th generation of the Conner family to own the home.

It was added to the National Register of Historic Places on September 1, 1978. It now serves as an upscale bed and breakfast with tours of the home throughout the year.

== Architecture ==
The house has two stories, with several bedrooms on each wing. The front porch has a 98 foot gallery with ten, hand-hewn doric columns. The intricately carved front door is said to be inspired by Tara's front door in "Gone with the Wind". And Linden also has several jib windows with access to the front gallery. There are 3500 square feet of covered porches to enjoy the peace and serenity of the seven lush acres. Inside, there is a painting by John James Audubon (1785–1851), and a portrait of Swedish opera singer Jenny Lind (1820–1887).
