= Benjamin Farar Sr. =

American plantation owner and public official (d. 1790)

Benjamin Farar
- Born: Province of South Carolina
- Died: 1790; Point Coupeé, Louisiana (New Spain)

Benjamin Farar Sr. (died 1790), often called Dr. Benjamin Farar, frequently spelled Farrar, especially in later histories, was an American plantation owner and public official. Originally from South Carolina where he served in the provincial legislature before the American Revolutionary War, he moved his family and hundreds of enslaved people to British West Florida in 1778 and he became a wealthy plantation owner in the Natchez District and Louisiana. He died in 1790, and his son Benjamin Farar Jr. inherited his estate.

== Revolutionary era ==
He and his father-in-law Tacitus Gaillard were both signatories to a 1768 petition to establish a parish church in the vicinity of Orangeburg, Berkeley County, South Carolina. In 1770 he participated in a planning committee to establish what became the College of Charleston. In 1768 and 1775 he was appointed a justice of the peace for Berkeley County. He served in the South Carolina Provincial Assembly in 1772. From 1775 to 1776 he was listed as a representative to South Carolina provincial assembly from the Saxe-Gotha district of Berkeley County. Farar had been a physician in South Carolina, and in the words of Paul H. Smith, an editor of the collected letters of the Continental Congressmen, Farar had "been a leading supporter of the South Carolinian Regulators. Farrar's father-in-law Tacitus Gaillard, also a former South Carolina provincial assemblyman, was thought to be a lukewarm patriot and therefore fell obliged at this time to leave South Carolina with his family and settle in West Florida". Founding Father Henry Laurens, who had been soliciting the patriotic support of Gaillard and his sons-in-law through intermediaries since 1775, wrote Farar on March 7, 1778:

Three days ago I was honoured with your favor of 11th Febry. by the hand of our worthy friend the Reverend Mr. Turquand whom I immediately warned of danger to which your families & effects might otherwise have been exposed on the Water & even at any landing place after having once embarked & proceeded down the Mississippi, directed him to the best means for guarding against such danger, & in a word I have according to your request given him the best advice & assistance in my power in all respects, which renders it unnecessary to add that I wish your whole party, believing them to be in Strict friendship with these United States of America, happiness & prosperity. I am, Sir, Your obedient & most humble Servant.

== Spanish Natchez and Louisiana ==
Benjamin Farar and his father-in-law arrived in British West Florida in 1778. They had traveled up to Pittsburgh and used "five big bateaux equipped with cannon" to transport approximately 35 free whites and 400 to 500 enslaved people via the Ohio River and the Mississippi River to the Natchez settlement. They were initially suspected of intrigue, and people who encountered them believed they would prefer to settle under a Spanish, rather than British, flag. According to historian Robin F. A. Fabel, "...suspicion lingered. One [reason] was the unwillingness of their leader to take an oath of allegiance to the British crown until he had seen Governor Chester at Pensacola. Another was their background. Tacitus Gaillard had been a member of a rebel provincial congress. Benjamin Farrar, a former deputy surveyor in South Carolina, had been a Son of Liberty. Alexander McIntosh, the Indian commissary who had to entertain them at Natchez, thought it prudent not to insist that they take the allegiance oath there. Governor Chester had heard that the pair were supporters of the popular party in the Carolinas up to the time of the declaration of independence, after which they had turned decisively against the American cause, but he remained uncertain about their ultimate intentions."

Circa 1781 he took in the children of John Alston, who with his brother Philip Alston, had tried and failed to overthrow the Spanish colonial government based at Fort Panmure. One of the children, Ann Alston, married Farar's overseer Alexander Stirling. In 1783 he imported 18 Angolans from South Carolina to Louisiana, which was unusual because 97 percent of the 3,152 West Central Africans listed in the Louisiana Slave Database are recorded as Kongo.

Farar's wife's estate was documented in 1783, and the records of the people enslaved at his plantation on False River have been summarized by historian Gwendolyn Midlo Hall:

He held 153 slaves, by far the largest number of slaves on any plantation at the post. All the adult slaves on his estate were creoles of South Carolina (43) or creoles of Virginia (29), except for one woman who was a creole of Pennsylvania; or they were Africans who had also been brought in from South Carolina. The young children were listed as creoles, the older children as creoles of South Carolina. This estate reflected the composition of estates in South Carolina. Africans were about 45 percent of the adults. Eighteen were Angolan, 4 were Coromanti(Gold Coast), 18 were described as being from Guinea, a vague term. There was 1 Maninga male, 1 Chamba female, and 4 Ibo women. These slaves remained on his estate and were not sold to other planters. The child/woman ratio among these English creole and African women was very close: 0.519 for the creoles and 0.444 for the Africans. However, among children under the age of fifteen, 20 had been born to African mothers and 22 to creole mothers, though creole women of childbearing age outnumbered African women 27 to 18, pointing toward a surprisingly high fertility rate among African women in South Carolina.

One historian studying the development of the Louisiana Creole language suggested that "at least some of Farar's slaves spoke creole-like varieties of English resembling the Gullah language still spoken on the Sea Islands of South Carolina and Georgia".

In February 1785, Benjamin Farar Sr. was named a justice of the peace for the ultimately short-lived jurisdiction of Bourbon County, Georgia, along with his father-in-law Tacitus Gaillard, Nicholas Long, William Davenport, Nathaniel Christmas, Sutton Banks, William McIntosh, Cato West, Thomas Marston Green, William Anderson, and Adam Bingaman.

In an attempt to improve overland routes for migration and commerce, in 1785 Spanish colonial governor Esteban Rodríguez Miró hired Farar to break a new Natchez–Baton Rouge road. Farar estimated that it would cost him $250 to have his enslaved labor force clear a horse path, and $1,000 to have them create a wagon road.

In 1789 he was approached by a representative of the speculative enterprise South Carolina Yazoo Company, Alexander Moultrie, to serve as a local agent and point of contact with the Spanish. Moultrie wrote to Farar in January 1790 from Charleston, South Carolina, describing "...the grant of 8,750,000 acres to his company as lying just south of the area granted to the Virginia group, which was headed by Patrick Henry. A grant had been made to Moultrie and three others 'in behalf of ourselves and the other original associates.' The company was divided into twenty shares, each one represented by an ostensible holder who alone had the right to attend meetings and to vote...Moultrie's own share in the project was 500,000 acres, of which he offered 5,000 or 10,000 acres to Farrar at a price to be determined by negotiation". According to a history of the Yazoo land-speculation scandal, "Governor Miró described him, in 1790, as the largest planter in the province of Louisiana, and stated that he owned 290 slaves. In view of Moultrie's letter to him...it is interesting to note that Farrar sought and, in September, 1790, obtained permission to visit the United States on the pretext of purchasing tools and clothing for his slaves and spying on James Wilkinson."

The elder Benjamin Farar, called doctor, reportedly died in 1790 at Point Coupee. An inventory of his estate in 1790 listed 225 enslaved people.

He had been granted 10,500 arpents of land in the vicinity of Point Coupee by the Spanish. The Spanish grant was made on the April 26, 1790; 236 arpents fronted False River. The Farar plantation in Point Coupee originally produced indigo. His Point Coupee plantation was among those involved in the 1795 Point Coupée slave conspiracy along with the plantations of widow Baron, M. Bergeron, Simon Croizet, Charles Doufour, M. Goudeau, Colin Lacour, Leonor Lacour (widow of Jean Baptiste Lacour), Frederic Leonard, M. Patin, Poydras, Louis and Frédéric Richet, and M. Vigne. The Farar estate was likely the only "English" plantation in the vicinity.

In or about 1785, Nancy, an enslaved woman owned by Farar, was raped by a white man named Christopher Beard. From this was born a "mulatto girl" child named Venus. Farar made a provision for her in his will. She was to be manumitted and educated as a mantuamaker; he left her three male and three female slaves in his will of 1790, to be distributed to her when she was 18 years old.

According to Adams County court records, William Dunbar was the executor of his estate. Benjamin Farar Jr. was "only son and heir of all lands of said deceased in State of S. C." In 1795, planters Benajah Osmun and Ebenezer Rees witnessed power of attorney granted to one Ebenezer Potter.

== Legacy ==
The Farar family became part of the Natchez nabob class and remained influential in Mississippi until the American Civil War and beyond. In 1879, Jacksonian Democrat historian J. F. H. Claiborne described Benjamin Farar Jr. as "a South Carolinian of high character, whose estates passed by marriage to the late Dr. Wm. N. Mercer." According to D. Clayton James in Antebellum Natchez (1968), "The leadership of the [Adams County] gentry changed little from 1799 to 1860. Throughout the era such clans as the Ellises, Dunbars, Hutchinses, Farrars, Bislands, and Brandons stood pre-eminent in landholdings, slave ownership, and social prestige."

== Personal life ==
Benjamin Farar Sr. was married to Elizabeth Galliard, daughter of Tacitus Gaillard of South Carolina and the lower Mississippi. She lived from about 1754 until about 1778. There was an inventory of her estate done in 1783 that listed 154 legally enslaved people. They had three children who survived to adulthood. Mary Ellis Farar, Mary Farar Dick, Margaret Farar Butler, and Richard Butler all died in a yellow fever outbreak at Bay St. Louis in 1820.

- Benjamin Farar Jr. m. Mary Ellis, daughter of Richard Ellis
  - Ana Eliza Farar m. William Newton Mercer
  - Mary Farar m. John Dick
- Ann Frances Farar m. Samuel Charles Young (c. 1795) and/or m. Robert Young
  - Eliza Young, managed Laurel Hill with Wm. N. Mercer after his wife died
  - Benjamin Farar Young, m. twice (three?): Catherine Semple, then Margaret Wade Jane Brown Ross
    - Robert Semple Young
    - Wade R Young
  - Margaret Farar Young
- Margaret Madeline Farar m. Richard Butler; called Marguerite in Louisiana records, Julien Poydras was her legal guardian

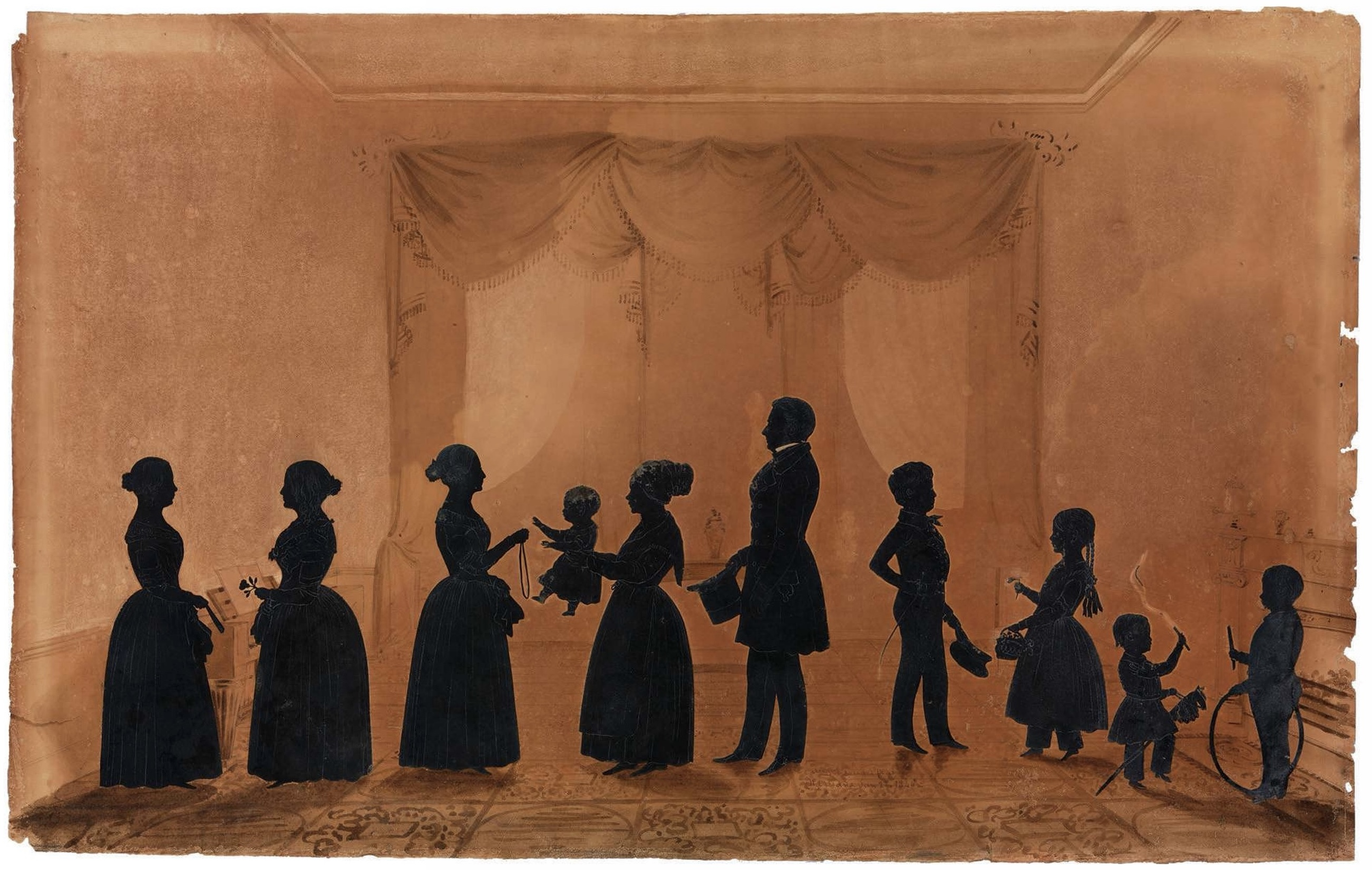
Benjamin Farar Young family of Natchez, Mississippi, portrait includes an enslaved woman handing off a baby to another woman 1844 silhouette by Auguste Edouart (The Historic New Orleans Collection, 1983.12)

== Sources ==
- Bass, Robert D. (1978). Ninety Six, the struggle for the South Carolina back country. Lexington, S.C.: Sandlapper Store. ISBN 978-0-87844-039-9. LCCN 77020551. OCLC 1392383270. OL 6675214W.
- Burnett, Edmund Cody (1910). Papers relating to Bourbon County, Georgia, 1785–1786. New York: MacMillan Company. OCLC 49477860 – via HathiTrust.
- Claiborne, J. F. H. (1880). Mississippi, as a province, territory and state, with biographical notices of eminent citizens. Jackson, Mississippi: Power & Barksdale. LCCN rc01002482. OCLC 68181845. OL 7795030W.
- Cummins, Light T. (1988). "Oliver Pollock's Plantations: An Early Anglo Landowner on the Lower Mississippi, 1769–1824". Louisiana History: The Journal of the Louisiana Historical Association. 29 (1): 35–48. ISSN 0024-6816. JSTOR 4232633.
- Din, Gilbert (1981). "War Clouds on the Mississippi: Spain's 1785 Crisis in West Florida". Florida Historical Quarterly. 60 (1) 6 – via library.ucf.edu.
- Din, Gilbert C. (1999). Spaniards, planters, and slaves: the Spanish regulation of slavery in Louisiana, 1763–1803. College Station: Texas A&M University Press. ISBN 978-0-89096-904-5. LCCN 99029227. OCLC 48139077.
- Fabel, Robin F. A. (1988). The Economy of British West Florida, 1763–1783. Tuscaloosa, Alabama: University of Alabama Press. ISBN 978-0-8173-0312-9. LCCN 86004328. OCLC 13332013.
- Hall, Gwendolyn Midlo (2005). Slavery and African Ethnicities in the Americas. Chapel Hill: University of North Carolina Press. doi:10.5149/9780807876862_hall. ISBN 978-0-8078-2973-8. JSTOR 10.5149/9780807876862_hall. LCCN 2005005917. OCLC 816498633. OL 2983392W.
- James, D. Clayton (1993) [1968]. Antebellum Natchez. Baton Rouge, Louisiana: Louisiana State University Press. ISBN 978-0-8071-1860-3. LCCN 68028496. OCLC 28281641.
- Klingler, Thomas A. (2003). If I could turn my tongue like that: the Creole language of Pointe Coupee Parish, Louisiana. Baton Rouge: Louisiana State University Press. ISBN 978-0-8071-2779-7.
- Livermore, Shaw (1939). Early American land companies: their influence on corporate development. Columbia University Foundation for Research in Legal History. New York: The Commonwealth Fund. LCCN 39006029. OCLC 1037764588. OL 153473W.
- McBee, May Wilson (1953). The Natchez Court Records, 1767–1805: Abstracts of Early Records. Ann Arbor, Michigan: Edwards Brothers, Inc. – via Internet Archive, digitized from a copy held at the Allen County Public Library Genealogy Center in Fort Wayne, Indiana.
- Rothstein, Morton (1979). "The Changing Social Networks and Investment Behavior of a Slaveholding Elite in the Ante Bellum South: Some Natchez Nabobs, 1800–1860". In Greenfield, Sidney M.; Strickon, Arnold; Aubey, Robert T. (eds.). Entrepreneurs in Cultural Context. School of American Research, Advanced Seminar Series. Albuquerque: University of New Mexico Press. pp. 65–88. ISBN 978-0-8263-0504-6. LCCN 78021433. OCLC 4859059.
- Smith, Paul Hubert, ed. (1982). Letters of delegates to Congress, 1774–1789. Vol. 9 (February 1 – May 31, 1778). Washington, D.C.: Library of Congress. hdl:loc.law/lldelegatesvol.76002592. ISBN 978-0-8444-0388-5. LCCN 76002592. OCLC 422766384. Internet Archive: lettersofdelegat09smit.
- Whitaker, Arthur P. (1927). The Spanish-American Frontier, 1783–1795: The Westward Movement and the Spanish Retreat in the Mississippi Valley. Boston: Houghton Mifflin Co. LCCN 27023368. OCLC 951828. OL 1159732W.
- ——— (1929). "The South Carolina Yazoo Company". The Mississippi Valley Historical Review. 16 (3): 383–394. ISSN 0161-391X. JSTOR 1895065.
