= Richard Butler (general) =

American army officer

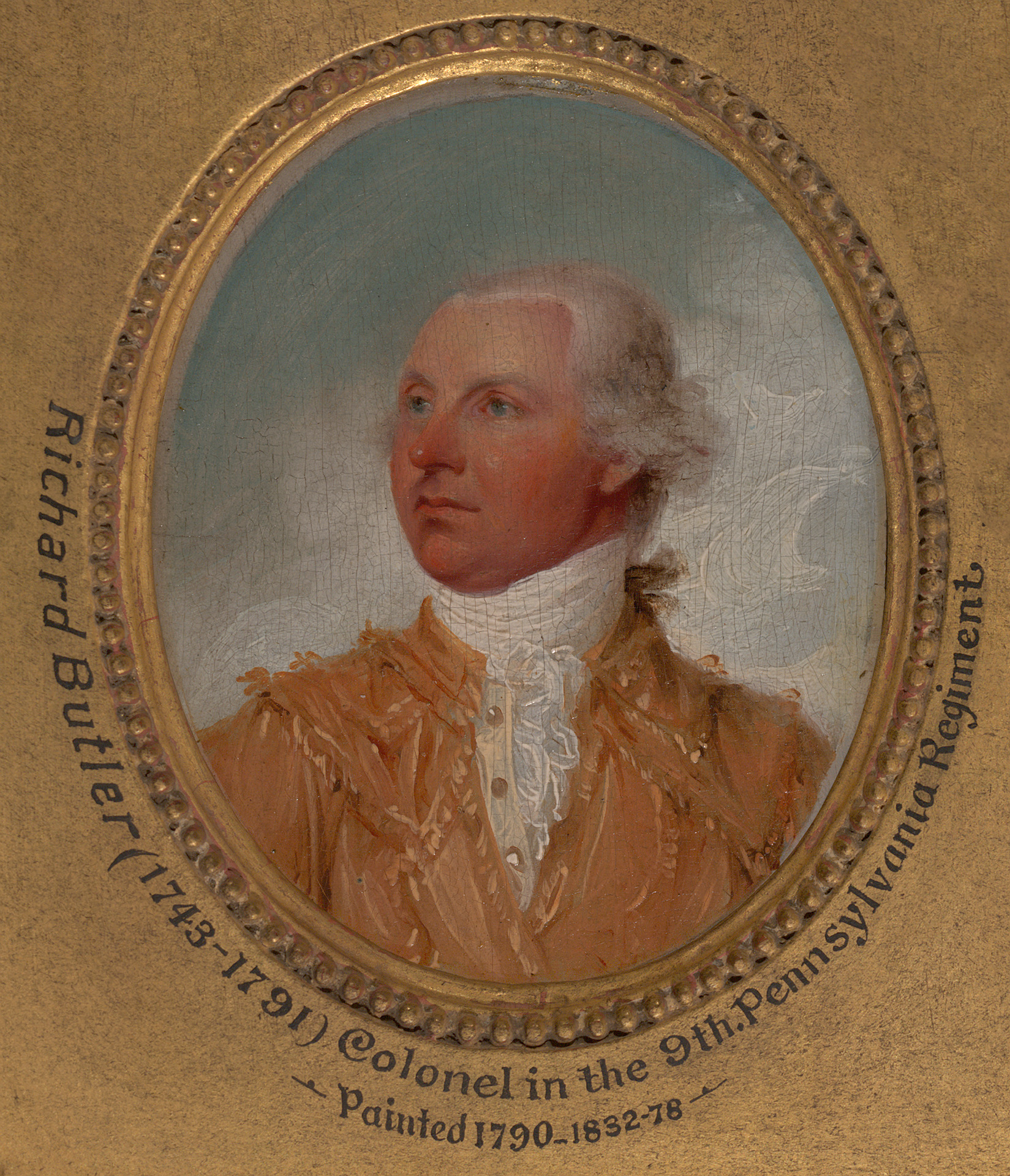
- Portrait by John Trumbull, 1790
- Born: April 1, 1743; Dublin, Ireland
- Died: November 4, 1791 (aged 48) near Fort Recovery, Ohio, U.S.
- Military career
- Allegiance: United States
- Branch: Continental Army; United States Army
- Service years: 1776-1783, 1791
- Rank: Major general
- Unit: Morgan's Riflemen
- Conflicts: American Revolutionary War; Battle of Saratoga; Battle of Monmouth; Northwest Indian War; St. Clair's defeat †
- Awards: Society of the Cincinnati

Major General Richard Butler (April 1, 1743 – November 4, 1791) was an American army officer who served in the American Revolutionary War and Northwest Indian War. He was killed in action during St. Clair's defeat while against fighting the Northwestern Confederacy.

== Family ==
Born in St. Bridget's Parish, Dublin, Ireland, Butler was the oldest son of Thomas and Eleanor (Parker) Butler. Thomas Butler was an aristocrat who served in the British army. He was the brother of Colonel Thomas Butler and Captain Edward Butler. All three brothers served in the American Revolution and in the Northwest Indian War against the Western Confederacy of Native American tribes in the Northwest Territories. His two other brothers, William and Percival, served in the Revolution but did not see later military service.

== Early life ==
In 1748 Butler's father opened a gun shop in Dublin, but that same year the family moved to Lancaster, Pennsylvania, where he learned to make the Pennsylvania long rifles used in the French and Indian War.

By 1760, the family had moved to the frontier at Carlisle, Pennsylvania, where Thomas and his sons manufactured long rifles and became friends with Daniel Morgan. The Butler gun shop still stands in Carlisle.

By the 1770s, Richard Butler and his brother William were important traders at Fort Pitt in Pennsylvania and in Ohio. A street in Pittsburgh, Butler Street, is named for them.

== American Revolution ==
At the outset of the American Revolution, the Continental Congress named Richard Butler a commissioner in 1775 to negotiate with the Indians. He visited representatives of the Delaware, Shawnee, and other tribes to secure their support, or at least neutrality, in the war with Britain.

On July 20, 1776, Butler was commissioned a major in the 8th Pennsylvania Regiment in the Continental Army under Colonel Aeneas Mackay and Lieutenant Col. George Wilson. He assumed command of the 8th PA for a short time after both Mackay and Wilson succumbed to illness in early 1777, following the regiment's winter march from Western PA to New Jersey. Butler was promoted to lieutenant colonel on March 12, 1777, retroactive to September 1776 and he then served under Col. Daniel Brodhead who took command of the 8th PA in April 1777. On June 7, 1777, he was promoted to colonel and placed in command of 9th Pennsylvania Regiment, however, in June he also was detached to Morgan's rifle corps to serve as second in command to his friend Daniel Morgan and did not assume command of the 9th PA until 1778.

He saw action with the 8th PA during the Battle of Bound Brook (April 1777), with Morgan's rifle corps at the Battle of Saratoga (Sept-Oct 1777) and with the 9th PA at the Battle of Monmouth (June 1778). His four other brothers also served, and were noted for their bravery as the "fighting Butlers".

In January 1781 he was transferred to the 5th Pennsylvania and in late June near Williamsburg, Virginia led "a small Advanc'd light Corps, to try to strike the Brittish rear," which they accomplished at the Battle of Spencer's Ordinary.

At the conclusion of the Battle of Yorktown in October 1781, General George Washington conferred on Richard Butler the honor of receiving Cornwallis' sword of surrender, an honor which Richard gave to his second in command, Ebenezer Denny. At the last moment, Baron von Steuben demanded that he receive the sword. This almost precipitated a duel between Butler and Von Steuben.

At the victory dinner for his officers, George Washington raised his glass and toasted, "The Butlers and their five sons!"

Following Yorktown, Butler remained in the Continental Army and was transferred to the 3rd Pennsylvania following a consolidation of the Army on January 1, 1783. On September 30 of the same year, he was breveted (i.e. an honorary promotion) as a brigadier general. Butler remained in active service with the Continental Army until it was finally disbanded on November 3, 1783.

In 1783 Butler and his brothers became Original Members of the Pennsylvania Society of the Cincinnati, a military society of officers who had served in the Continental Army.

== Post American Revolution activity ==
After the war, the Confederation Congress put Richard Butler in charge of Indians of the Northwest Territory. He negotiated the Treaty of Fort Stanwix in 1784, in which the Iroquois surrendered their lands. He was also called upon during later negotiations, such as the Treaty of Fort McIntosh in 1785.

Butler returned to Pennsylvania, and was a judge in Allegheny County. He also served in the state legislature. He married Maria Smith. They had four children, only one of whom lived to have children and continue the line.

In 1789 he registered with the Cumberland County clerk that he was the legal owner of a six-year-old "term slave" named Charlotte.

Butler also fathered a son, Captain Butler (or Tamanatha) with Shawnee chief Nonhelema. Butler and his Shawnee son fought in opposing armies in 1791.

In 1791, Butler was commissioned a major general in the levies (i.e. militiamen conscripted into Federal service) under Major General Arthur St. Clair to fight against the Western Confederacy of Native Americans in the Northwest Territories (modern day Ohio). He was killed in action on November 4, 1791, in St. Clair's Defeat at what is now Fort Recovery, Ohio.

Reportedly he was first buried on the battlefield, which site was then lost until it was accidentally found years later. The remains were laid to rest with the remains of the other fallen at Fort Recovery.

== Legacy ==
Butler County, Ohio, where Fort Hamilton stood, is named for Richard Butler, as are Butler County, Kentucky, and Butler County, Pennsylvania. The city of Butler, Pennsylvania, and the General Richard Butler Bridge (located in the city of Butler) are also named for him.

A miniature portrait of Richard Butler was painted by "The Painter of The Revolution," Colonel John Trumbull, in 1790 and is in the collection of Yale University.

He is also honored in the name of General Richard Butler KYSAAR, Butler County, Kentucky recognized August 20, 2016. A chapter of the Sons of the American Revolution is named for him as well as on in the Daughters of the American Revolution (DAR), the General Richard Butler Chapter, founded in Butler, Pennsylvania.

== See also ==
- Fighting Butlers
