= William Butler (colonel) =

American Revolutionary War (d. 1789)

Colonel William Butler
- Died: 1789
- Military career
- Allegiance: United States
- Branch: Continental Army
- Service years: 1776–1783
- Rank: Lieutenant Colonel
- Unit: 4th Pennsylvania Regiment
- Conflicts: American Revolutionary War: Battle of Monmouth; Burning of Unadilla and Oquaga; Sullivan-Clinton Expedition
- Other work: Original member of the Society of the Cincinnati

Lieutenant Colonel William Butler (died 1789) was a Pennsylvania officer during the American Revolutionary War, known for his leadership in the Battle of Monmouth, the burning of the Indian villages at Unadilla and Oquaga, and in the Sullivan-Clinton Expedition.

Butler's exact year of birth is unknown, but he was probably born in the mid-1740s. His family emigrated from Ireland sometime before 1760 and settled in Cumberland County, Pennsylvania. In the late 1760s he worked as a frontier fur trader near Pittsburgh with his brother Richard.

He was commissioned a lieutenant colonel in the Continental Army upon the formation of the 4th Pennsylvania Regiment on October 25, 1776. He was retired from the Army on January 1, 1783. He was an original member of the Society of the Cincinnati.

His son was Richard Ellis Butler.

== Family ==
Butler was the second of five brothers who served as officers in the American Revolution. The two oldest brothers were born in Ireland. The brothers were, from oldest to youngest:

- Richard (1743–1791), killed in the Northwest Indian War
- William, the subject of this article
- Thomas (1748–1805), 2nd Pennsylvania Regiment, severely wounded in the Northwest Indian War
- Percival (1760–1821), 2nd Pennsylvania Regiment, an adjutant general of Kentucky in the War of 1812
- Edward (1762–1803), 9th Pennsylvania Regiment and the Northwest Indian War, adjutant general of the US Army
