= 9th Pennsylvania Regiment =

Continental Army infantry regiment

- Active: 1776–1781
- Allegiance: Continental Congress
- Type: Infantry
- Part of: Pennsylvania Line
- Colors: Brown with Red Facings
- Engagements: Battle of Brandywine (1777); Battle of Paoli (1777); Battle of Germantown (1777); Battle of Monmouth (1778); Battle of Springfield (1780)

Commanders
- Notable commanders: Colonel Richard Butler

The 9th Pennsylvania Regiment was authorized 16 September 1776 and was assigned to the main Continental Army on 27 December 1776. It was organized during the spring of 1777 to consist of eight companies of volunteers from Westmoreland, Lancaster, Chester, Philadelphia and Cumberland counties of the commonwealth of Pennsylvania. The regiment was assigned to the 3d Pennsylvania Brigade of the main Continental Army on 27 May 1777. On 1 July 1778 the regiment was re-organized into nine companies. On 22 July 1778 the regiment was reassigned to the 2d Pennsylvania Brigade. It was consolidated with the 5th Pennsylvania Regiment on 17 January 1781 and re-designated as the 5th Pennsylvania Regiment and concurrently furloughed at Trenton, New Jersey. The regiment would see action during the Battle of Brandywine, Battle of Germantown, Battle of Monmouth and the Battle of Springfield.

The regiment was known for wearing brown uniforms with red facings and a brimmed leather jockey cap adorned with a black feather.

== See also ==
- 5th Pennsylvania Regiment
