= William Edward West =

American painter

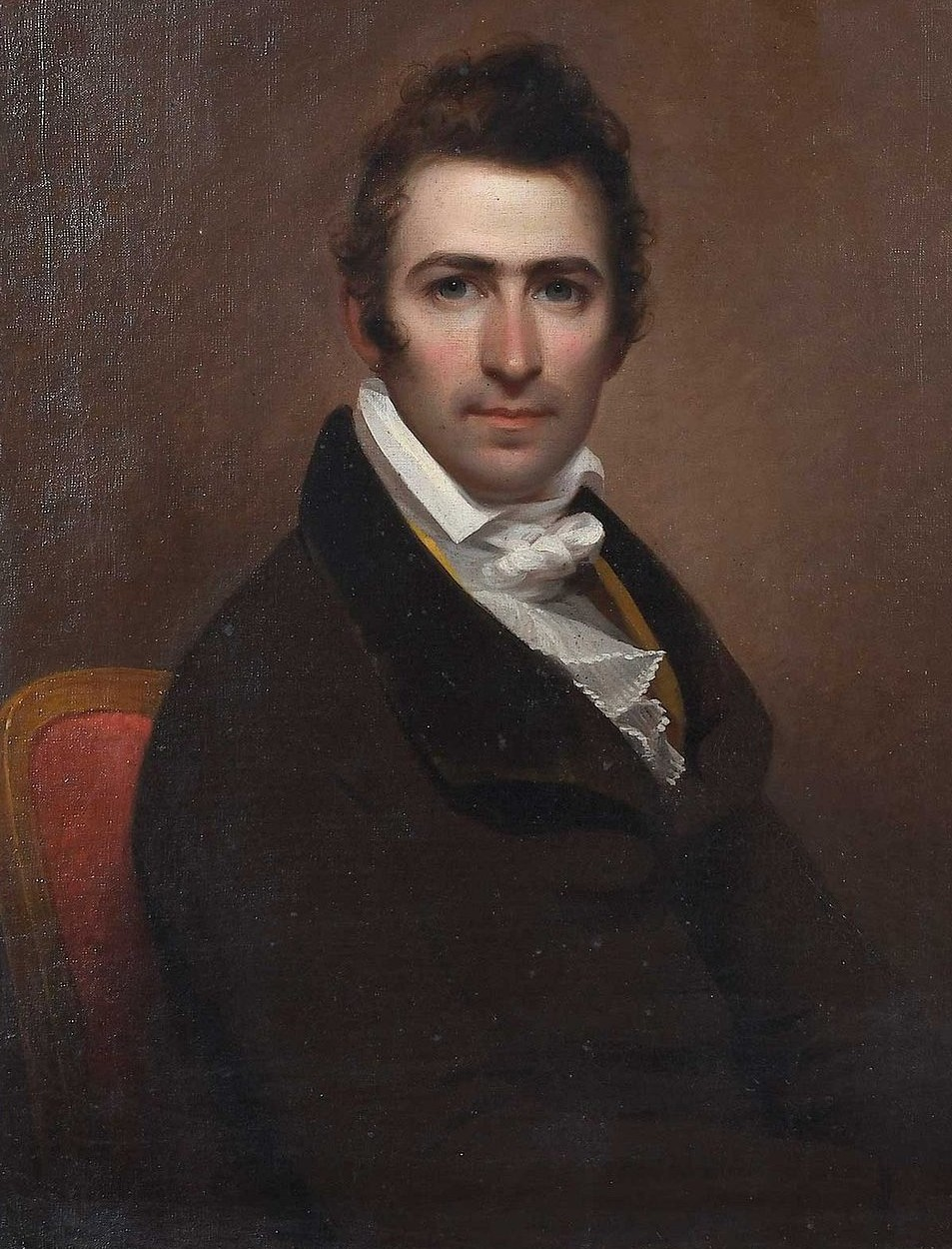
William Edward West, self portrait.

William Edward West (1788 – February 8, 1859) was an American painter, primarily of portraits.

== Family ==
West was born in Lexington, Kentucky in 1788. His father was a silversmith, and responsible for his early artistic training. In 1809 he moved to Philadelphia where he studied with Thomas Sully.

== Career ==
In 1817 West traveled extensively around Europe, in particular Italy (where he studied in Florence under the painter Giuseppe Bezzuoli), France, and England. He frequently painted commissioned portraits by wealthy families. During this time he met Washington Irving who West collaborated with to provide numerous illustrations for Irving's books. West's works were shown at the Royal Academy of Arts and the British Institution. He returned to the United States, and settled in Baltimore where he continued to paint portraits until his death in 1859.

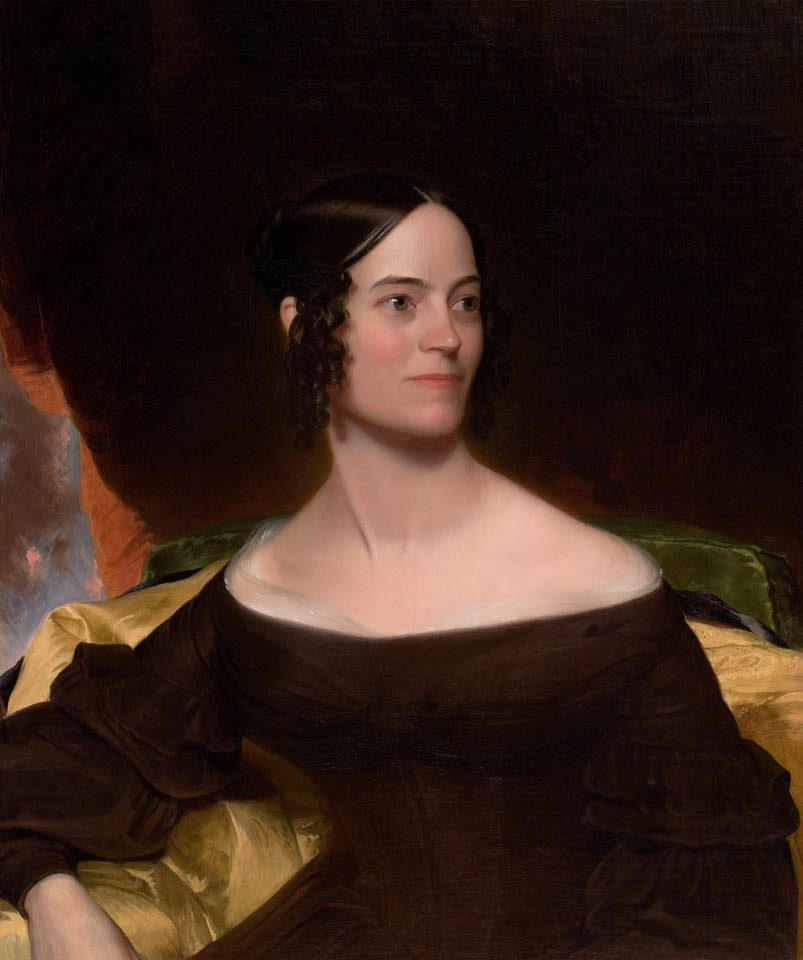
Elizabeth Calvert by William Edward West, Johnson Collection, Spartanburg, South Carolina, 1839

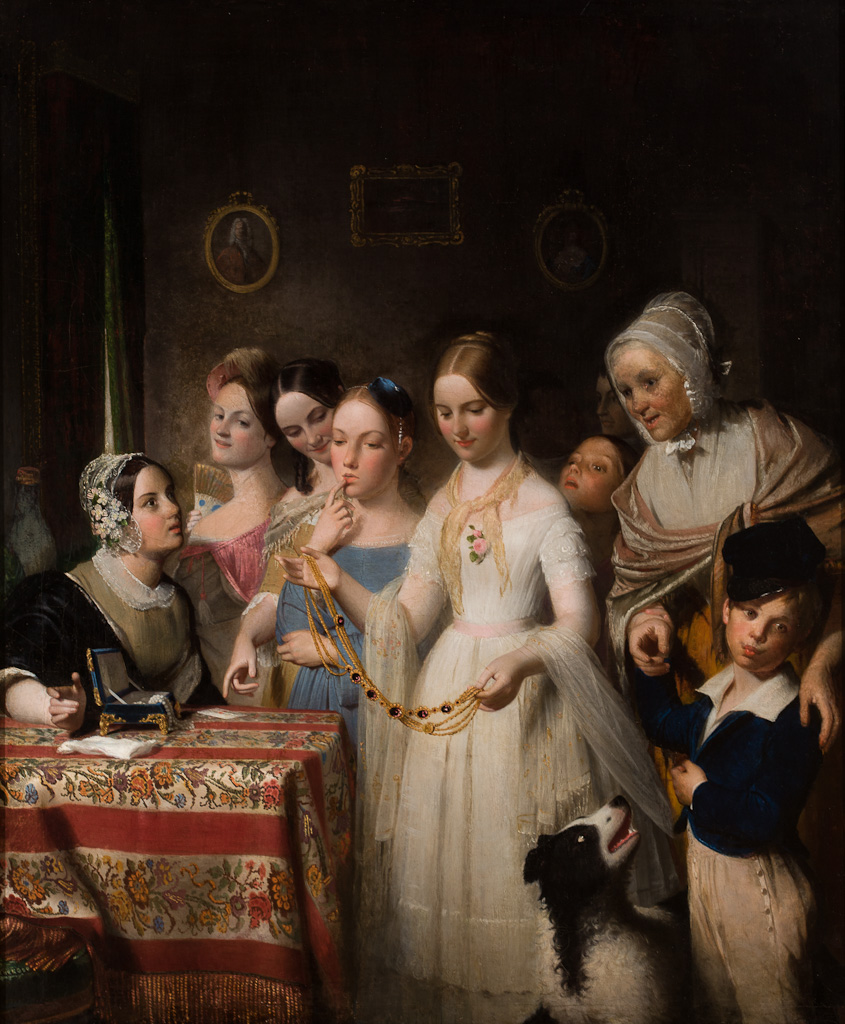
The Present by William Edward West, Speed Art Museum, 1833

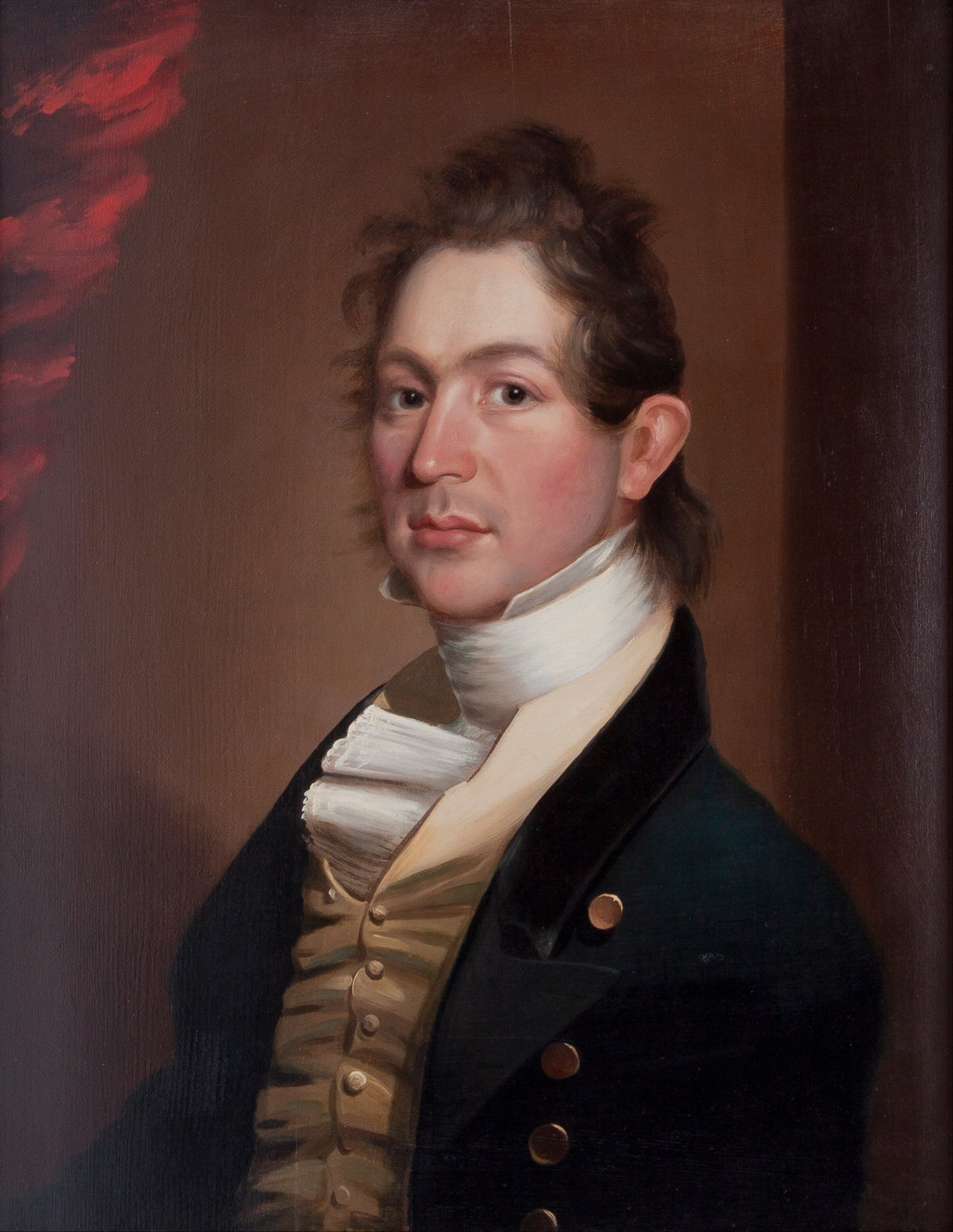
Thomas R. Fosdick

Mrs. Thomas Upshur Teackle (Emma Jane Wilson) by William Edward West, private collection, Baltimore, c. 1839–41
