= Peter Chester (governor) =

Colonial governor of West Florida (1720–1799)

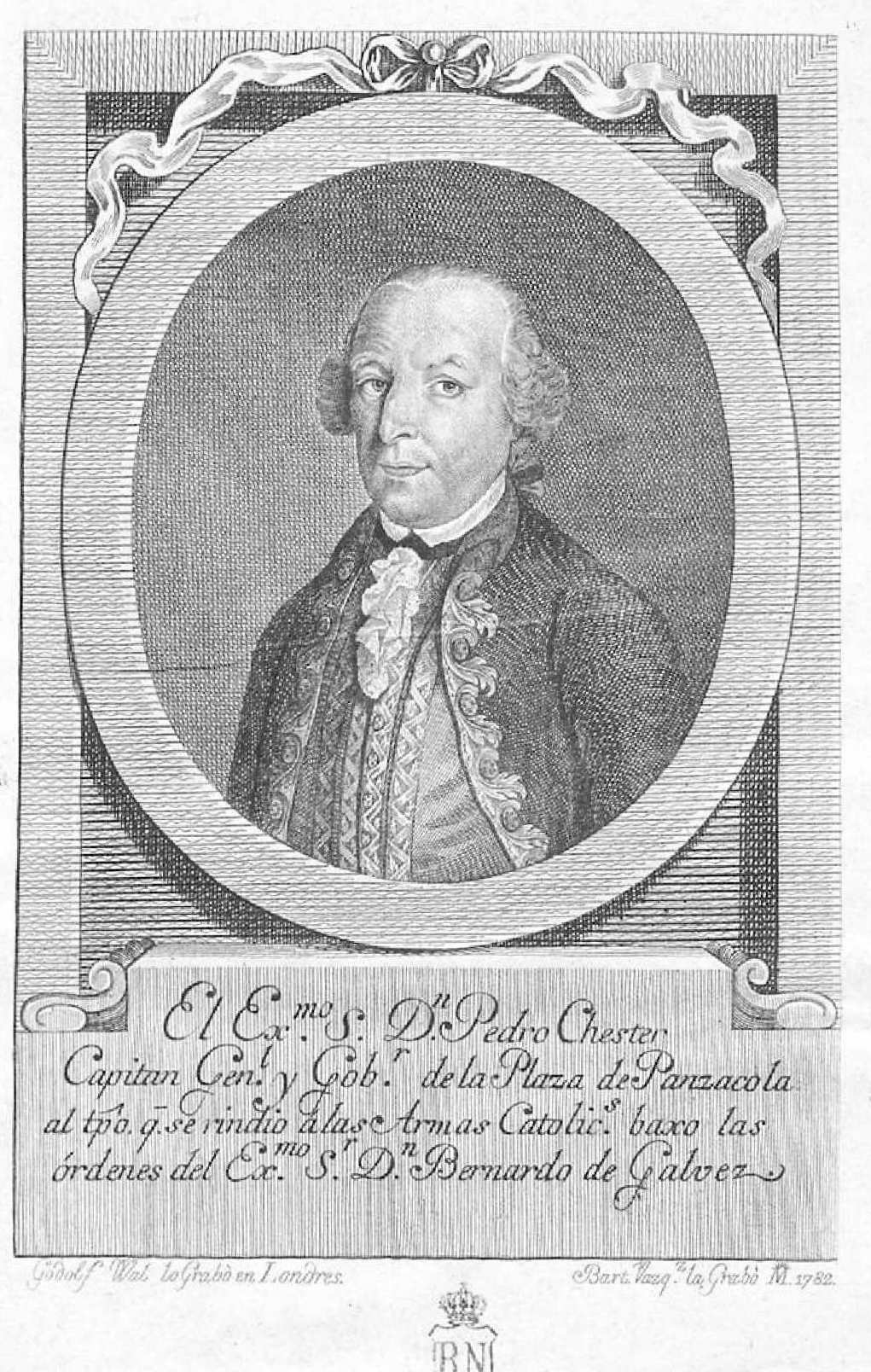
Depiction of Peter Chester by Bartolomé Vázquez

Peter Chester (1720–1799) was the last governor of the British territory of West Florida from August 1770 until 9 May 1781.

Chester focused on agricultural development in the Lower Mississippi Valley. Spain controlled the land west of the Mississippi River, Britain its east side.

Chester was the area's third governor (fifth if acting governors are included). He dealt with issues related to Native Americans in Florida. John Stuart was the Superintendent of Indian Affairs in the Southern District of North America. George Washington wrote to him March 25, 1773. Robert Ross also wrote a letter to Chester, on August 14, 1778.

British artist Arthur Devis (1711 – 1787) produced an oil painting of a hunting scene with Peter Chester, his brother Edward Chester who owned Cockenhatch estate manager Thomas Gorsuch, and a clergyman of Barkway.

Britain's National Archives at Kew have some of his correspondence in their collection.

== See also ==
- List of colonial governors of Florida
