= Cato West =

American military officer and politician

Cato Charles West was an American military officer and politician. He was Secretary of the Mississippi Territory and served as an acting territorial governor of Mississippi in 1804 and 1805. He corresponded with U. S. President Thomas Jefferson.

== Career ==
He was a militia commander and had land claims in the territory. He succeeded William C. C. Claiborne who was posted to New Orleans after Thomas Jefferson made the Louisiana Purchase. He received a memorial of grievances.

In 1917 a local historian wrote, "Of Cato West it is well-nigh useless to speak. He was one of the strongest writers of his day—a sort of intellectual athlete, who did not fall to serve the right cause at the right time, and in the right way. He was the father-in-law of Edward Turner and not only one of the ablest men, but one of the worthiest, who added to the greatness of the territory, which he never failed to serve, when he deemed occasion justified. Of the 1817 convention, he was an active, strong member, never hesitating to espouse the right, as he saw it."

== Legacy ==
His family published a history on the bicentenary of his death.

== See also ==
- List of governors of Mississippi
