= Torture of slaves in the United States =

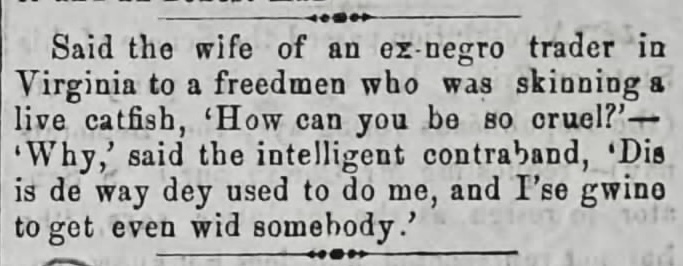
"Said the wife of an ex-negro trader in Virginia to a freedmen who was skinning a live catfish, 'How can you be so cruel!'—'Why,' said the intelligent contraband, 'Dis is de way dey used to do me, and I'se gwine to get even wid somebody.'" (Waynesboro Record, Waynesboro, Penn., March 9, 1866)

Torture of slaves in the United States was fairly common, as part of what many slavers claimed was necessary discipline. As one historian put it, "Stinted allowance, imprisonment, and whipping were the usual methods of punishment; incorrigibles were sometimes 'ironed' or sold." Alternatives to torture as a means of increasing productivity included "direct payment of slaves for extra work."

Accounts of torture come from both slavers and the enslaved, although accounts from the formerly enslaved were historically mistrusted or discounted. In one famous such case, retold in a reconsideration of the WPA Slave Narratives by historian Rebecca Onion, "In Virginia, Eudora Ramsay Richardson, the state director, refused to believe a story that Roscoe Lewis, the director of that state's Negro Writers Unit (and a professor at the Hampton Institute), recorded during an interview with ex-slave Henrietta King. King told Lewis that she had taken some candy at age eight or nine, and that her slaveholder had punished her by holding her head under a rocking chair while she whipped her. The incident had resulted in a crushed jawbone and permanent disfigurement. (King said the violence gave her 'a false face...What chilluns laugh at an' babies gits to cryin' at when dey sees me.') Disbelieving Lewis's account, Richardson went to King's home to fact-check it, thinking it was a 'gross exaggeration'. She found instead that '[King] looks exactly as Mr. Lewis describes her and she told me, almost word for word the story that Mr. Lewis relates.'"

== Whips and similar ==
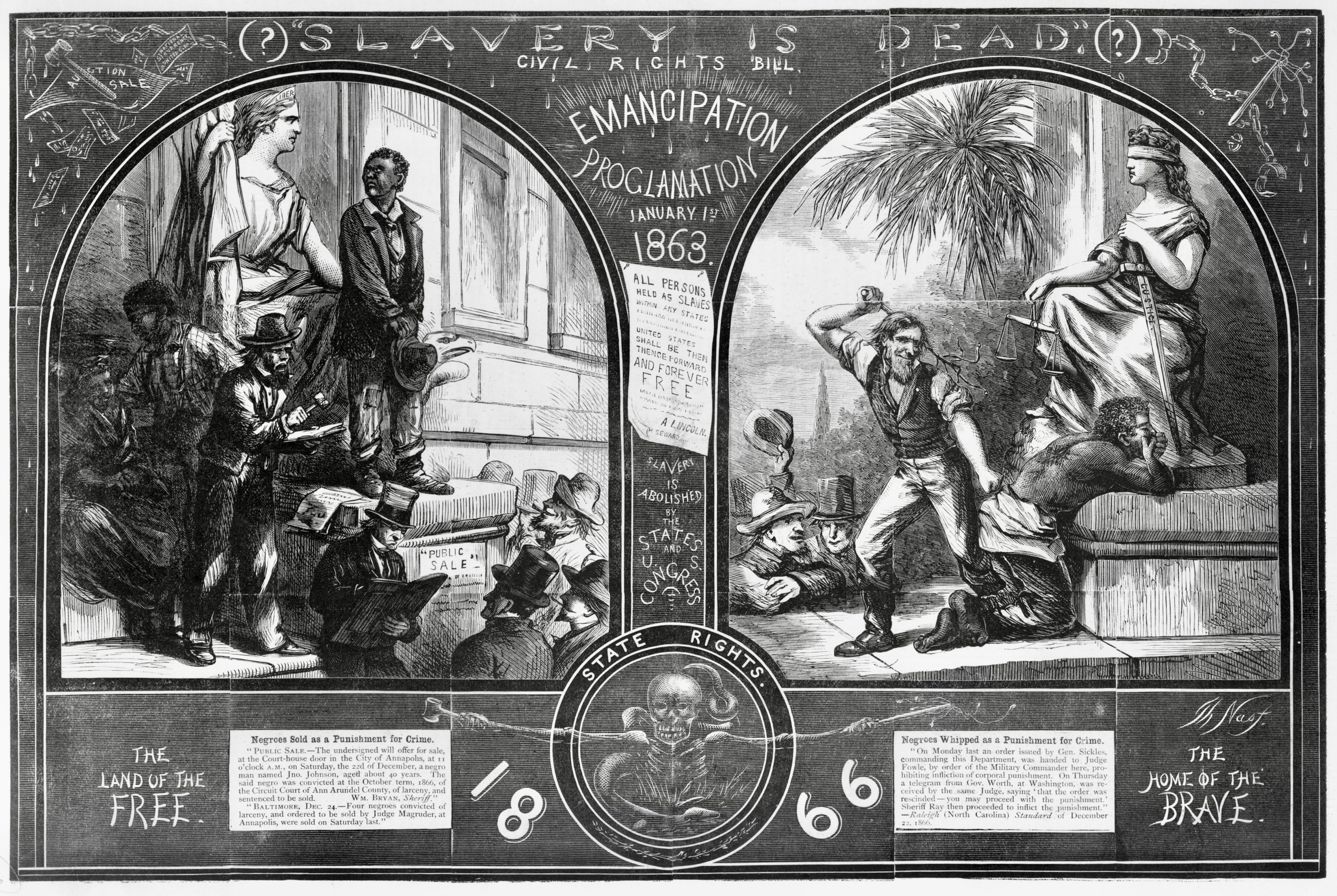
This Thomas Nast illustration depicts the cat-o-nine-tails lash in use.

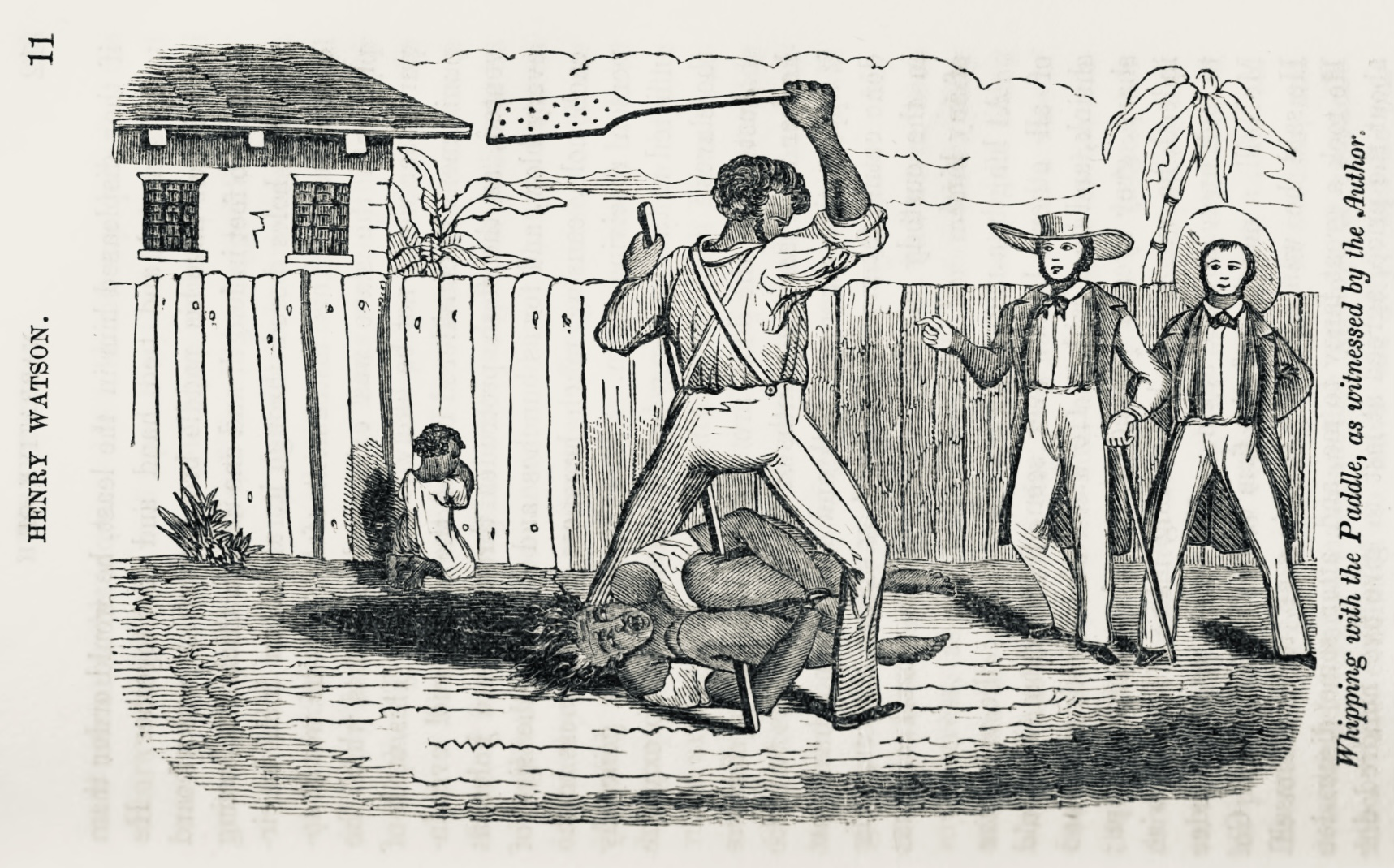
"Whipping with the paddle as witnessed by the author" (Narrative of Henry Watson, a Fugitive Slave, 1848)

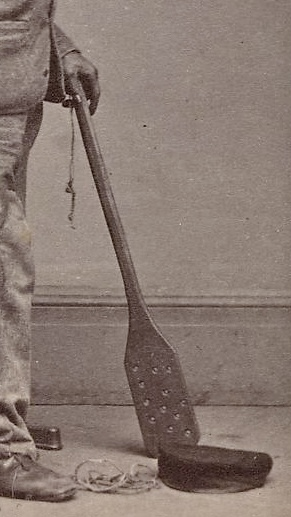
Detail of the "hot paddle" from the Wilson Chinn photos taken during the American Civil War

Simon who escaped from Nashville in 1819 had "a scar on his ear, and a great many on his back." A slave owner named B. T. E. Mabry of Beatie's Bluff, Madison County, Mississippi placed a runaway slave ad in 1848 that described the missing man as "has been severely whipped, which has left large raised scars or whelks in the small of his back and on his abdomen nearly as large as a persons finger". In the testimony of Peter of the scourged back he mentions "salt brine, which Overseer put in my back". This practice, sometimes called salting, was attested in many accounts of slave torture reported over many decades. Other substances, including turpentine, hot-pepper juice, and dripping candle wax, were also used. An interview with Andrew Boone for the WPA's Slave Narrative Collection in the 1930 matter-of-factly described the practice: "By dis time de blood sometimes would be runnin' down dere heels. Den de next thing was a wash in salt water strong enough to hold up an egg. Slaves wus punished dat way fer runnin' away an' sich." Another account stated, "...there was a puddle of blood on the floor just as if a hog had been killed. He then took a paddle and paddled her on top of that almost to death, and made me wash her down with brine. The brine is to keep the raw flesh from putrifying, and to make it heal quick. They mix it very thick and rub it in with corn husks."

There was a form of whipping called hand sawing: "Jones figured that 'hand-sawing' probably meant 'a beating administered with the toothed-edge of a saw'." In November 1838, J. R. Long reported that a slave who had run away from his plantation had been caught. He added: "I gave him a real whipping and hand sawing and he has been a fine negroe ever since. I told him he might run off if he chosed and I would knock out one of his jaw teeth and brand him and I intend to stick to my promise."

Historian Charles S. Sydnor reported that "Paul, the headwaiter of the hotel" in Grenada, Mississippi was accused of helping slaves escape north (most likely by the town's two railroad connections); after whipping him with rawhide failed to elicit a confession, his accusers escalated to something called "the hot paddle," which was "a thin piece of wood with holes bored through it, and it was applied to the naked flesh." According to Sydnor, Paul never confessed.

In addition to whipping by owners and overseers, at least two slave traders are said to have engaged in systematic torture, reserving flogging rooms in their slave jails for this purpose: Theophilus Freeman of New Orleans, and the slavers of Poindexter & Little, where the lashes were administered by "Uncle Billy." Public jails that used corporal punishment on slaves included the Charleston Workhouse, Louisville Workhouse, and the Cage in Richmond, Virginia.

Corporal punishment did not necessarily succeed in reforming behavior. According to Williamson County, Tennessee chancery court records, one estate in probate owned Eli, who was described as a slave "'of notoriously bad character.' He had broken into 'twelve or fifteen houses' and had stolen property from several persons. He had been found guilty of stealing and whipped within the 'past two or three years'. He had received 'several thousand lashes'. He was, at that time, in jail in Franklin for breaking into the house of a 'widow woman'. Neighbors armed themselves and threatened to kill Eli on sight. He, in turn, threatened to burn their houses." Eli was sold in 1840 to George G. Boyd for $475.

== Restraints ==
American slaves were commonly restrained by various means. Among the irons described in various accounts are spiked collars, hooked collars, belled collars, neck bars, wrist manacles, leg hobbles, and cuffs, typically in company with various types and lengths of chains. Thus, the local blacksmith was a crucial skilled laborer to have in the community for those who wanted to do large-scale management of slaves. In Slave Life in Georgia John Brown described accompanying Bob Freeman when he took prisoners from Theophilus Freeman's jail in New Orleans to the blacksmith to have shackles put on and removed. A plantation record book from Georgia records the fees paid to the blacksmith for this service: "May, 1852, Taking off Irons from Negro, $2.00; Ironing a Negro, $3.50".

Slave pens had staples and ringbolts mounted to the wall beams, ceiling joists, and/or floor, by which chains could be attached and the slaves secured over night. Big city slave jails had steel doors and high narrow transom windows. Big-city Southern hotels sometimes had cells in the basement. Countryside slave jails were sometimes log-built cabins with tree-trunk-thick walls, and sometimes underground cellar-dungeons, like those of beneath the houses of slave traders James McMillin and Ned Stone of Kentucky, and on the property of George Kephart in Maryland.

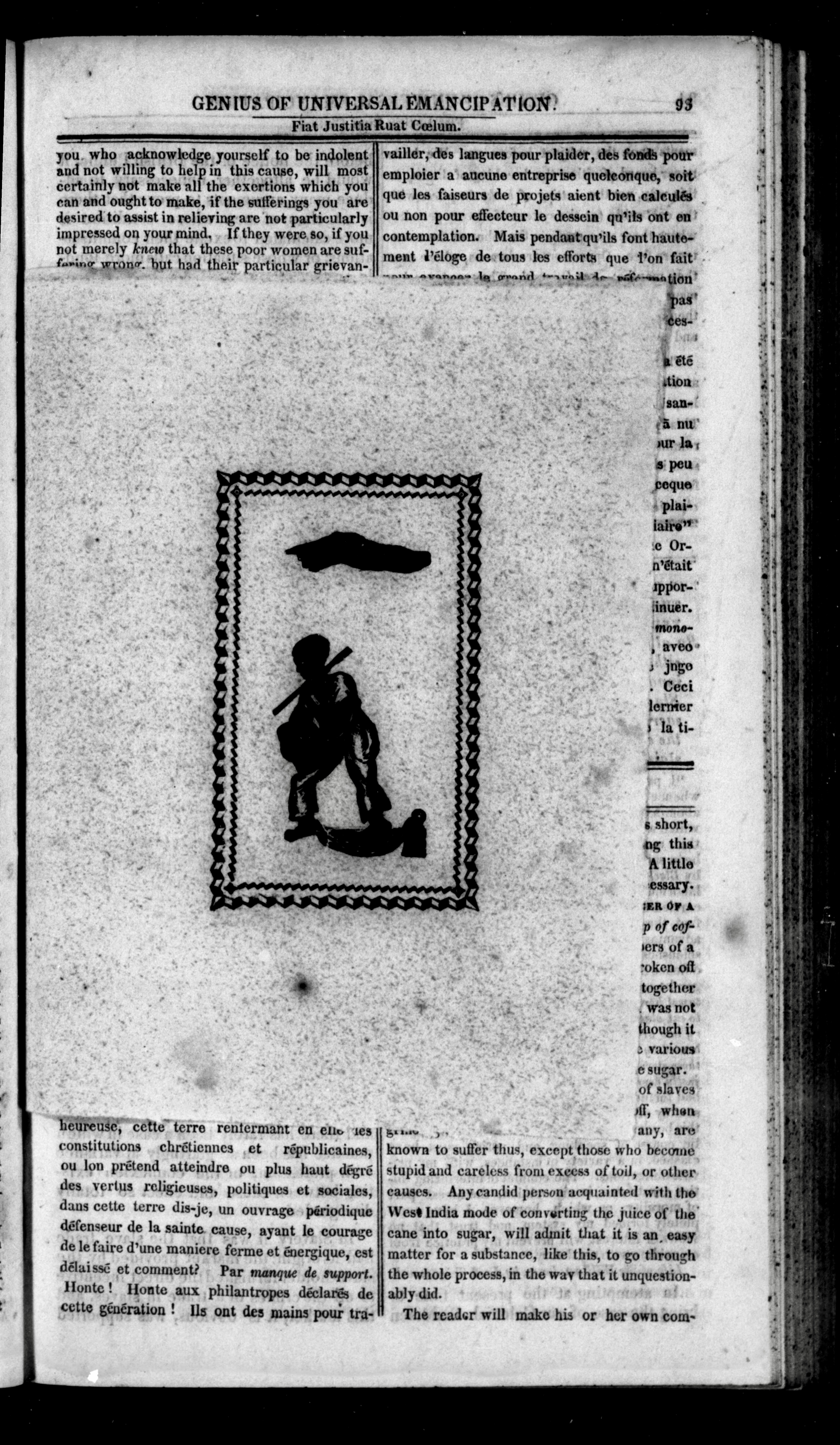
Benjamin Lundy commissioned this etching of something he'd seen in Baltimore "near the corner of Lexington and Eutaw Streets...a negro boy about 14 or 15 years of age, perhaps, who for some cause that I did not hear assigned by him, he compelled to work in the cellar, with an iron yoke or collar (as it is called) weighing several pounds on his neck, and a long chain attached to one ankle and a 56 pound weight!!! In this predicament the poor youth was laboring with one other person in the cellar, as aforesaid...the 'yoke' above mentioned, which is much used in some parts of this State. Verbal descriptions of such things seldom convey adequate ideas to the minds of readers in general."

A British officer who landed in Louisiana for the Battle of New Orleans wrote of encountering an enslaved man named George who had been put in a spiked collar that prevented him from sleeping. In 1813 the sheriff of Adams County, Mississippi picked up a woman who said she was legally owned by the Surgets; she was described as being "very much cramped in both her hands, occasioned, as she says, by a burn. She has a large bar of iron round her neck". In 1817 Jesse Torrey described the restraints used on one man who had been indentured but was being sold south as a slave for life: "[He] was a mulatto man, about 21 years of age, I found him thoroughly secured in irons. His arms were manacled with strong loops round his wrists, resembling a clevis connected by a strong iron bolt. On the shelf, over the fire place, lay a pair of heavy rough hopples, (or hobbles,) with which he said his legs had been fettered until a short time previous, but were then secured by a pair of polished gripes, (perhaps manufactured for the purpose, resembling the patent horse fetters with locks.) connected by a strong new tug chain, with a loose end of two or three feet in length, lying upon the floor." Lamb was missing from a plantation near Pinckneyville, Mississippi, in 1818, last seen wearing a "leg iron" and a "very narrow rim'd hat." One account of a journey made down the Mississippi River in 1822 stated, "...a little below the red Church, at the house of a planter, whose negroes and some from the neighbouring plantations, were forgetting their sorrows in the festivity of a dance—among the merriest of them was one who had an iron collar round his neck, with two small bars projecting as high as the top of his head, one on each side, and a chain passing from the collar down each side to his knees by which he was secured to staples in the floor at night—He had attempted to run away—Some of the negroes showed me several irons of different forms, in which delinquents are confined—." Further down the River at New Orleans: "The streets are wide, and cross each other at right angles. They are cleaned by negroes (runaways) all of whom are chained, that is, have chains to their legs, which are fastened round their middle during the day, and secured to rings in the floor of the calaboose or prison at night."

A fugitive slave named John or Jack was put in Oktibbeha County, Mississippi jail in 1850; when he was captured he had an iron collar with bell attached. The Bullock Museum in Texas holds a belled slave collar. Mary Gaffney, interviewed for the WPA Slave Narratives Project, told the interviewer that "back there in Mississippi I'se saw slaves wear bells because they would get a pass and not come home when Maser would tell them to and for being contrary. Them bells was fixes on a brace so'es the slave could not hold the clapper or get them off." The Henry Ford in Dearborn, Michigan holds a hooked collar used on slaves; "Slaves known for running away might have had to wear an iron collar like this, for punishment or to prevent them from running away again. The hooks caught on bushes or tree limbs, causing a violent jerking to the individual's head and neck."

In 1820 a 21-year-old man named William was picked up by the Wilkinson County jailor "with a large iron on his right leg, and a trace chain around his neck, locked on with a padlock." In 1834, a runaway slave, named Henry (Hal for short) was picked up in Murfreesboro, Tennessee, at which time he "had on his wrists a pair of negro traders' hand cuffs broken." Lamb was wearing a leg iron when he escaped a plantation near Pinckneyville, Mississippi in 1818. A runaway slave ad placed in a New Orleans newspaper in 1839 mentioned that the missing man, "WILLIAM, or BILL, a cook by trade...had a chain to his leg when he left the City Hotel, Common Street."

According to a slave testimony published in The Emancipator, "It is very common for slaves to run away into the woods after being badly whipped. They are forced to, for they cannot do their tasks, and so they have to stay in the woods till they get well. Sometimes they stay there five or six weeks till they are taken, or are driven back by hunger. I have known a great many who never came back; they were whipped so bad they never got well, but died in the woods, and their bodies have been found by people hunting. White men come in sometimes with collars and chains and bells, which they had taken from dead slaves. They just take off their irons and then leave them, and think no more about them."

== Mutilation and branding ==
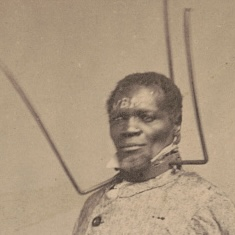
Wilson Chinn was enslaved by Volsey B. Marmillion (recte Valsin B. Marmillion), who made a standard practice of branding his slaves on the face with his initials, V.B.M.

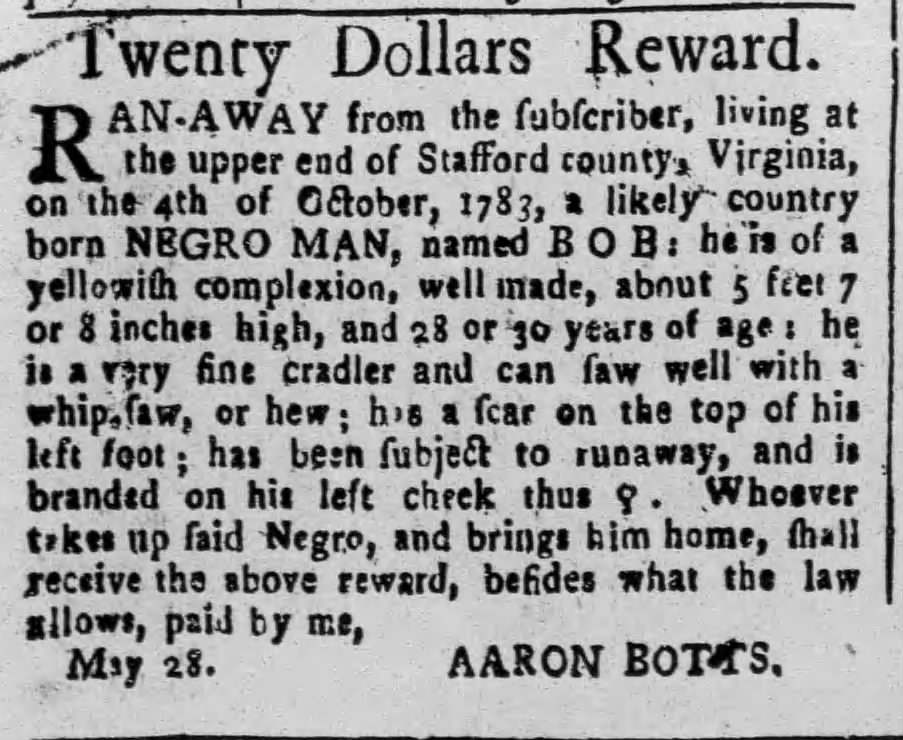
"Twenty Dollars Reward" Poulson's American Daily Advertiser, Philadelphia, July 17, 1784

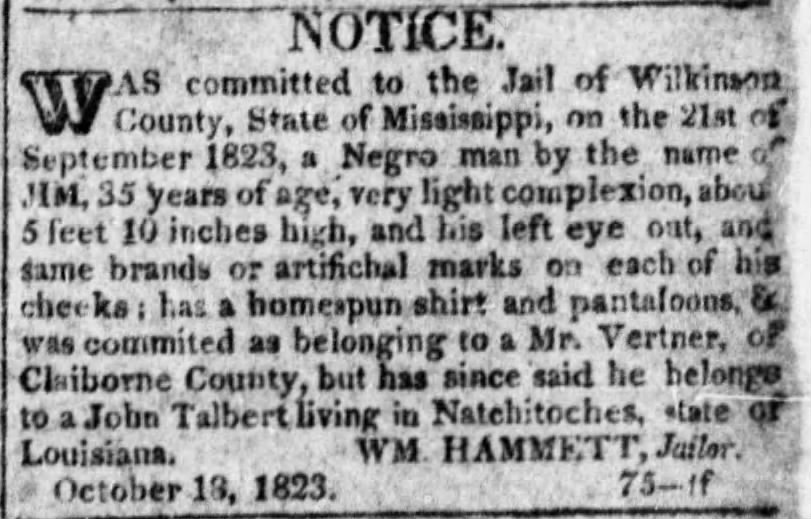
Jim (b. c. 1788) had "his left eye out, and same brands or artificial marks on each of this cheeks" (Natchez Gazette, December 6, 1823)

According to historian Michael Tadman, "Persistently troublesome slaves were often to be identified by whip marks, while reclaimed runaways were often identifiable by brandings, by cropped ears, or by the absence of front teeth."

=== Branding ===
There is widespread evidence that branding irons were used on people. Brand marks were burned onto people's cheeks, foreheads, shoulders, and breasts.

In 1806, Benjamin Farar, "one of the most prosperous planters" of the Natchez District, offered a $20 reward for the capture of 26-year-old Sam, "5 feet 9 or 10 inches high, large prominent eyes, he has an impediment in his speech, is branded on the breast B. F." Sometime before 1810, Claud Guillaud of Louisiana branded Pierre, who was a native of Le Cap Français, Saint-Domingue, with the initials C. G. In 1818 John escaped from a plantation near Point Coupee; he could be identified readily by brands "on both shoulders with some letters, not recollected." Also in 1818, Natchez planter James A. Gillespie (son-in-law of Calvin Smith and brother of John F. Gillespie) was looking for 22-year-old Bennett, who was "branded on the left cheek with a C and on the right cheek with an I." George C. Purvis of Mount Pleasant, Mississippi explained in a runaway slave ads of 1819 and 1820 that Harry—who sometimes called himself Free Jim—had been branded with Purvis' initials G. P. because Harry was a "noted runaway." A man named Willis who had recently been transported by slave traders from Tennessee to Natchez "was branded in the hand for theft" on May 2 or 3, 1820 "and on the 6th made his escape." In 1832, a Mississippi county sheriff described a fugitive slave in his jail as "branded on the forehead with something like LB". A man named Frank was branded on both cheeks "which is plain to be seen when said negro is newly shaved". News reports of 1847 had it that an Englishman living at Cape Girardeau had branded a man named Reuben on the face with the words "A slave for life". In 1852, a planter living near New Carthage, Louisiana was looking for a 30-year-old man named Henry Owen, a runaway slave who could be readily identified if captured, as he had been branded with his previous owner's initials and had his current owner's name written "across his breast in India ink." In 1854 the Carroll County, Mississippi jailor reported that he had possession of a 25-year-old man named John who was legally owned by a man named Will Thomas who lived near Lake Providence, Louisiana; John had "the name of BOYD, written on his breast." The January 12, 1856 issue of The Creole newspaper of Louisiana reported on a jury's conviction of "slave owner William Bell for branding a runaway slave he had repossessed. He was fined $200 and 'the jury decreed the slave should be sold away from him.'"

=== Amputation ===
Strategic amputation and mutilation of slaves by slave owners was also known. In 1806 a runaway slave ad placed in a Natchez paper described Samuel, "the toes off each foot," having escaped from his captors about 10 mi (16 km) "below the Ozark river." Harriet Beecher Stowe described an escaped preacher who had been branded on both breasts and had toes cut off on both feet. A runaway slave ad published in Huntsville, Alabama in 1849 described 30-year-old Ben of Martin County, North Carolina as having "no particular marks perceptible, only the little toe of each foot is off." A black man arrested in Alabama in 1839 had "a small piece out of each of his ears." In 1835, Henry, who was believed to be a runaway slave from Madison County, was put in the jail of Hinds County, Mississippi; according to the jailer, Henry had "toes of both feet burnt off."

== Sexual abuse ==
Sexual cruelty is documented: The 1853 case of Humphreys vs. Utz in the Louisiana Supreme Court awarded civil damages to a Madison Parish plantation owner whose overseer nailed a man's penis to a bedstead and then whipped him until he ripped his penis off the nail. The man, who was called Ginger Pop or Bob, was about 30 years old. He died shortly thereafter and was buried on the grounds of the plantation. In June 1863, New York Times correspondent "De Soto" (William George) reported witness statements describing genital burning and breast mutilation on a Black River plantation in Catahoula Parish, concluding his account "If any one, upon reading this...says he does not believe it, I have only to reply, I do."

== Methods of execution ==
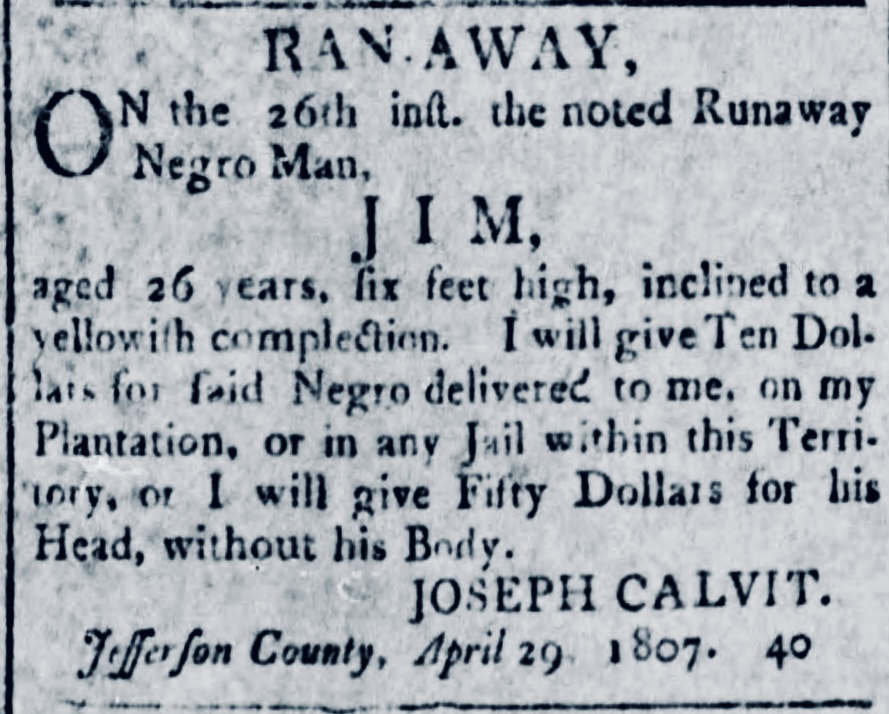
"I will give Ten Dollars for said Negro delivered to me...or I will give Fifty Dollars for his Head, without his Body." —Joseph Calvit, Jefferson County, Mississippi Territory, April 29, 1807

Cherokee chief David Vann, possibly circa 1805, "tortured and then burned to death a slave who had helped a white man to rob him." James Robinson, a Protestant minister and a veteran of both the American Revolution and the War of 1812, described a capital punishment on the Mississippi River plantation of Calvin Smith. A slave called Ben killed overseer Bird Carter. A cylindrical casket was made "just his length" and spiked through with sharpened nails. Ben was taken to the top of a hill, put inside the casket, and "was rolled down to the bottom. Of course his whole body was a perfect jelly, or perfect mince meat. Every particle of flesh was torn from his bones. The cask was opened, and the jelly, for his flesh was nothing else, was thrown into the river." This device appears to be described in at least one other slave narrative: "He had a neighbor named Bellinger, on the Dorchester road. One day master sent me to his plantation on an errand, and I saw a man rolling another all over the yard in a barrel, something like a rice cask, through which he had driven shingle nails. It was made on purpose to roll slaves in. He was sitting on a block, laughing to hear the man's cries. The one who was rolling wanted to stop, but he told him if he did'nt roll him well he would give him a hundred lashes. Bellinger is dead now." In 1842 the murder of two white men and the rape and torture of two white women was concluded with the burning at the stake of the culprits, one at Union Point, Mississippi, and the other at the mouth of the Red River. Another reported case of lynching by immolation was the execution of two enslaved men accused of the murder of Henry Yerby of Old Town, Phillips County, Arkansas in 1849. In Letters from an American Farmer, Crèvecœur writes of a journey to Charleston, South Carolina that "ends with terror. Seeing a cluster of crows in the swamp, he approaches a tree; there, he sees a captive with his eyes plucked out by birds, crying for death in the cage where he hangs as punishment for killing an overseer."

== See also ==
- Slave jails in the United States
- Treatment of slaves in the United States
- Glossary of American slavery
- Bibliography of slavery in the United States
- Suicide, infanticide, and self-mutilation by slaves in the United States

== Sources ==
- Flanders, Ralph Betts (1933). Plantation Slavery in Georgia. Chapel Hill, North Carolina: The University of North Carolina Press. LCCN 33037653. OCLC 9876467.
- Little, Thomas Vance (Spring 1989). "Slavery in Williamson County" (PDF). Williamson County Historical Journal. 20. Franklin, Tennessee: 101–129. LCCN 86642787. OCLC 14186085.
- McLoughlin, William Gerald (1986). Cherokee Renascence in the New Republic (ebook ed.). Princeton, N.J.: Princeton University Press. ISBN 978-0-691-04741-6. JSTOR j.ctv39x611. LCCN 86042843. OCLC 13859438. OL 2129522W. Project MUSE book 61052.
