= Slave mortgage =

Financial instrument

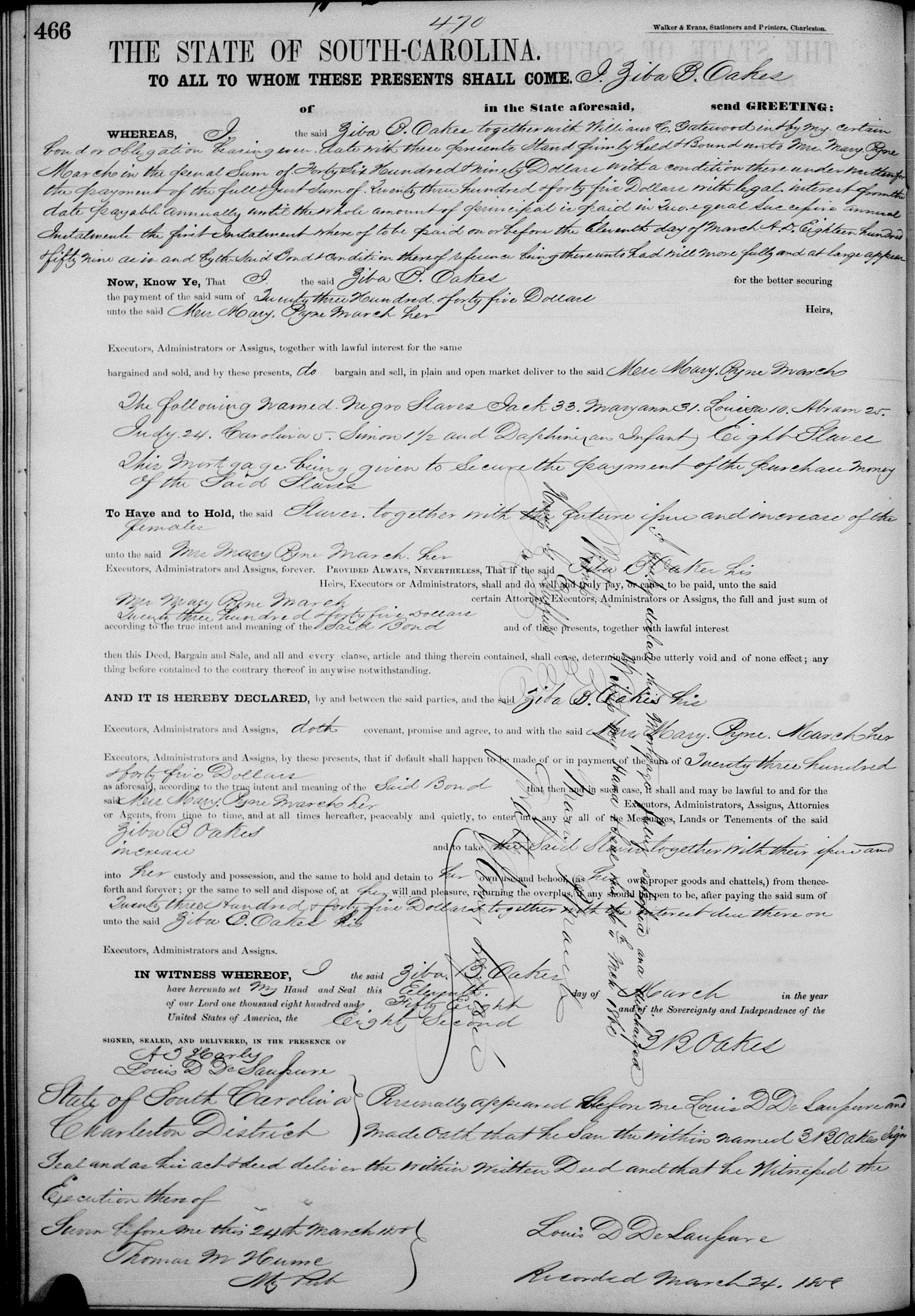
South Carolina slave mortgage agreement between slave trader Ziba B. Oakes and Mrs. Mary Pyne, backed by eight enslaved people including 10-year-old Louisa, an infant, and the future "increase of the females"

A slave mortgage was a financial instrument used by financiers wherein money was lent on the basis of the value of enslaved people. There are records of slave mortgages in the United States (Louisiana, South Carolina, and Virginia) and in South Africa. According to scholar Bonnie Martin, "the time lag between the recording of mortgages and foreclosures, when added to the dispersed nature of the mortgage recording process, made this financial engine relatively invisible, allowing potentially large economic and human consequences to remain unrecognized." As historian Calvin Schermerhorn put it, slave mortgages "drew equity out of [slave] bodies to reinvest in [sugar] refinement technology and more enslaved workers". Settlers fleeing a slave mortgage crisis was one of the precipitating factors of the American colonization of the Republic of Texas in the 1830s.

== Slave insurance ==
Slave insurance in the United States; became an increasingly significant industry after the Act Prohibiting Importation of Slaves, a federal law which took effect in 1808, prevented any new slaves from being imported to the U.S. Existing slaves, especially skilled workers, therefore became more valuable, and were often rented out to businesses; slave owners insured against the death or loss of these rented-out slaves. Industries which rented insured skilled slaves from their owners included blacksmithing, carpentry, railroad construction, coal mining, and steamboat operations, and insured rented slaves also included firemen and cooks. Chinese slaves, called "coolies", were also insured.

The subject of slave insurance in the United States has become a matter of historical and legislative interest. In the history of slavery in the United States, a number of insurance companies wrote policies insuring slave owners against the loss, damage, or death of their slaves. The fact that a number of insurers continue the businesses that serviced these policies has brought attention to this history.

== See also ==
- Slave insurance in the United States
- Nadir of American race relations
- Abolition of slavery timeline
- American Descendants of Slavery (ADOS)
- Glossary of American slavery
- Colonial history of the United States
- Female slavery in the United States
