= James Robinson (soldier, born 1753) =

African American soldier in the American Revolutionary War (1753–1868)

Rev. James Robinson
- Born: James Robinson; March 21, 1753; Eastern Shore of Maryland
- Died: March 27, 1868 (aged 115); Detroit, Michigan
- Burial place: Elmwood Cemetery, Detroit; 42.3472486°N 83.0171011°W
- Spouse: Curtilda
- Children: Alexander, Wesley Sr.
- Military career
- Allegiance: United States
- Branch: Continental Army (American Revolutionary War); United States Army (War of 1812)
- Rank: Private
- Nickname: Old Father Robinson
- Conflicts: American Revolutionary War; Battle of Brandywine; Siege of Yorktown; War of 1812; Battle of New Orleans
- Awards: Gold Medal of Valor (Kingdom of France)

Rev. James Robinson (March 21, 1753 – March 27, 1868) was an American preacher and soldier who served during the American Revolutionary War. Born into slavery on the Eastern Shore of Maryland in 1753, Robinson later became a minister and was remembered for his military service during the Revolutionary War.

Robinson served under Gilbert du Motier, Marquis de Lafayette during the Revolutionary War. He was later associated with the War of 1812 and became a prominent African American veteran of the early United States. His life and military service have been documented in historical works on African American participation in the American Revolutionary War.

== Revolutionary War service ==
Robinson's owner, Francis De Shields, had him enlist at age 24 and fight in a Virginia Light Infantry Regiment with the promise that he could earn his freedom. His regiment was one of several African American regiments under the command of the General Gilbert du Motier, Marquis de Lafayette. He fought in the Battle of Brandywine which was a British victory. Also White Haven, Roanoke River, Ragged Point, on Dorset County River, Vienna Ferry, and Cambridge. On October 14, 1781, he led the charge of 400 American troops up British redoubt #10 at the Siege of Yorktown and he attacked and defeated three British soldiers at once and the redoubt was captured. General Gilbert du Motier, Marquis de Lafayette, was so impressed with his actions that he awarded Robinson a Gold Medal of Valor. This would make him the highest decorated African American veteran of the Revolutionary War. He was one of between 5,000 and 10,000 African Americans who served on the American side in the Revolutionary War.

== War of 1812 service ==
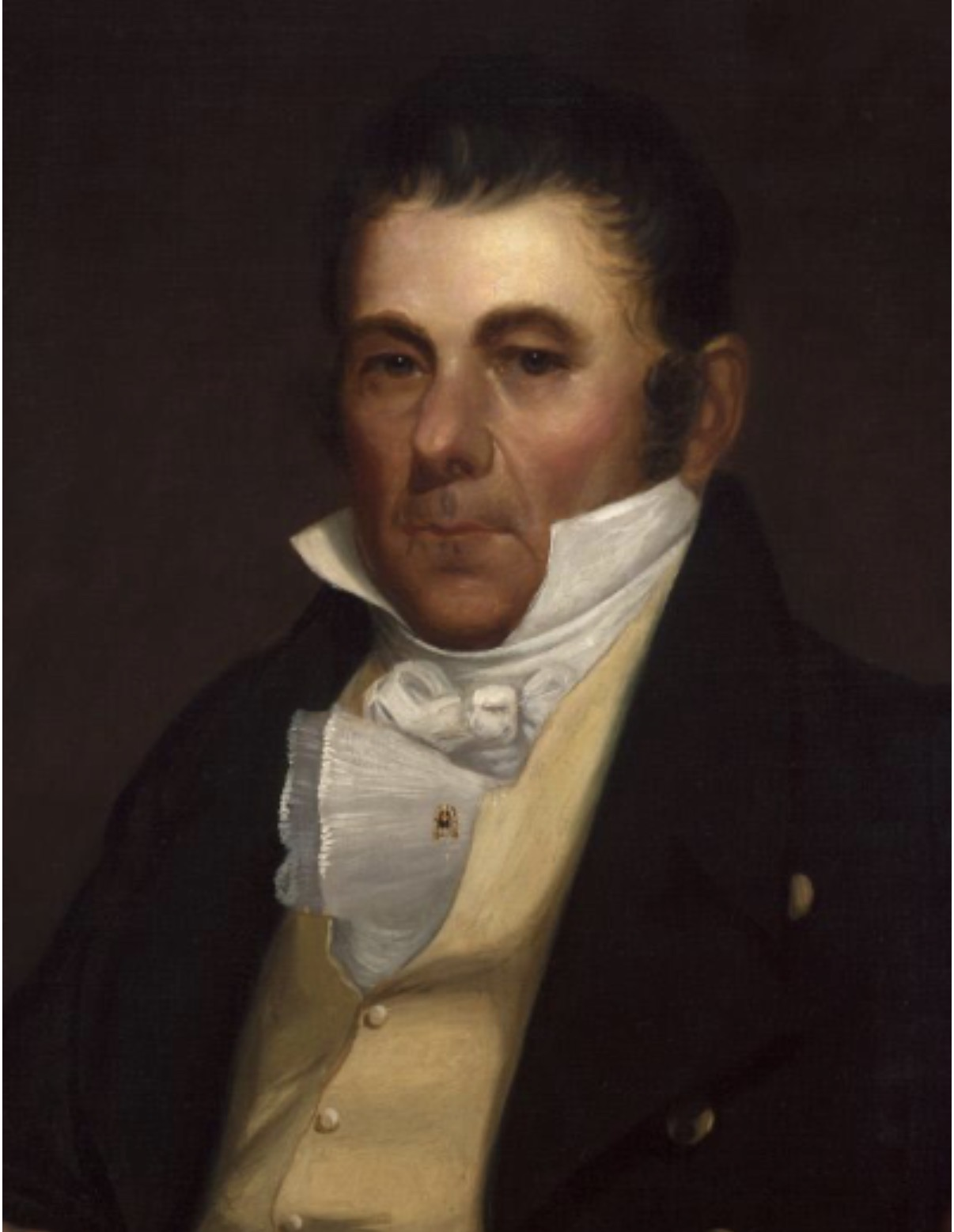
By Robinson's account, Calvin Smith's plantation was a charnel house; the son of a Massachusetts minister, Smith regularly preached sermons about obedience

Robinson was probably stationed with John Coffee's troops; a group of Choctaw recruits served as anti-British snipers in the adjacent cypress swamp (National Park Service map, 1961)

After the Revolutionary War, De Shields reneged on his promise to free Robinson and sold him in New Orleans back into slavery in Louisiana. The slave trader was one William Wall. His new master Calvin Smith was cruel and unforgiving, according to Robinson. His cousin was whipped, salted, and put in the stocks, dying from the trauma within a week of being brought to Smith's plantation in the Natchez District. Robinson described Smith's son-in-law John F. Gillespie as being the prototypical keeper of a shadow family, having five White children with Smith's daughter and five mixed children with an enslaved Black woman. Gillespie and the former Susan Smith were both killed in the 1855 Camden & Amboy train wreck.

Soon thereafter, Andrew Jackson traveled to Smith's to enlist 500 slaves to prepare for the Battle of New Orleans. Roberts was one of these 500 men.

During an engagement, one of Robinson's fingers was shot off in battle. Also, at some point, he was struck by a saber in the head, leaving a scar he would carry his whole life. After the American victory, soldiers gathered around General Andrew Jackson, and he announced that the slaves who had fought would not be freed after all. According to Robinson in a slave narrative he dictated shortly before the American Civil War, Jackson lectured his fellow white officers on the perpetuation of slavery in America:

"Never," said he, "suffer negroes to have arms; if you do, they will take the country. Suffer them to have no kind of weapons over ten inches long. Never allow them to have a piece of paper with any writing on it whatever. You must examine your slaves very closely, for the time is coming when the slave will get light; and if ever his mind is enlightened on the subject of freedom, you cannot keep him. One slave bought from the East will ruin a multitude of those raised here. Before a slave of mine should go free, I would put him in a barn and burn him alive. Gentlemen, take me at my word; for if you do not, you will be sorry for it before many years. Never arm another set of colored people. We have fooled them now, but never trust them again; they will not be fooled again with this example before them. If you do, you will repent of it but once."

Robinson thought about taking his gun and shooting General Andrew Jackson right then and there but decided against it.

== Later life ==
In concluding this brief history of my life, I think I cannot do it better than by giving some advice to my race of people, since it is right that the young should profit by the experience of their aged fathers.

Never be led into such hurtful errors as your fathers have been before you. Now then take counsel from me, one who has fought in the revolutionary war, and thereby caused the chains of slavery to be bound tighter around the necks of my people than they were before; and not being satisfied at that, by fighting in Jackson's war at New Orleans, riveted the chains closer, ten times, than they would have been had we colored men never fought in that battle; for it was by the indomitable bravery of the colored men that the battle was fought and victory gained. Had there been less bravery with us, the British would have gained the victory, and in that event they would have set the slaves free; so that I now can see how we, in that war, contributed to fasten our chains tighter. Therefore, my earnest and departing request is, that should this country ever again engage in war with any nation, have nothing whatever to do with the war, although the fairest promises should be made to you. Do not forget the promise Jackson made us in the New Orleans war—"If the battle is fought and victory gained on Israel's side, you shall all be free," when at the same time he had made a bargain with our masters to return home again all that were not killed. Never will a better promise be made to our race on a similar occasion. But for our faithfulness and manly courage, we should all be free men and women this day. Avoid being duped by the white man—he wants nothing to do with our race further than to subserve his own interest, in any thing under the sun.

It is not for me to foretell the end of oppression in this country, but one thing is certain, virtue, sobriety, industry, temperance, economy, education and religion, will fit you for any emergency whatever, and are the best qualifications for free men. That their attainment may be your constant pursuit and most earnest endeavor, is the prayer of one now ready to depart.

— The Narrative of James Roberts, 1858

In 1825, Robinson once again met Lafayette during his return tour of the United States. Robinson obtained his freedom in the 1830s, and became an ordained minister. According to the 1840 and 1850 U.S. Censuses, he was living in Butler County, Ohio with his wife Curtilda. They had two sons, Alexander and Wesley Sr. Wesley would go on to serve in the American Civil War in the 102nd United States Colored Infantry Regiment. According to the 1860 U.S. Census, Robinson and his family had moved to and were living in Detroit. Robinson wrote The Narrative of James Roberts, a slave narrative about his life using the assumed name of James Roberts. At the time of Robinson's death, he lived at 137 East Fort Street in Detroit. Robinson's family lived at 136 W. Lafayette Blvd in Detroit, which is now a private park called Lafayette Greens. In the 1860s, Roberts lived in Detroit.

Robinson died in Detroit on March 27, 1868, at the reported age of 115. During his funeral, large crowds gathered to watch. He was the last living African American veteran of the Revolutionary War at the time and the oldest person buried in Elmwood Cemetery. His last known living descendant was Gertrude Robinson, his granddaughter, who died in Ohio in 1983.

== Military honors at last ==
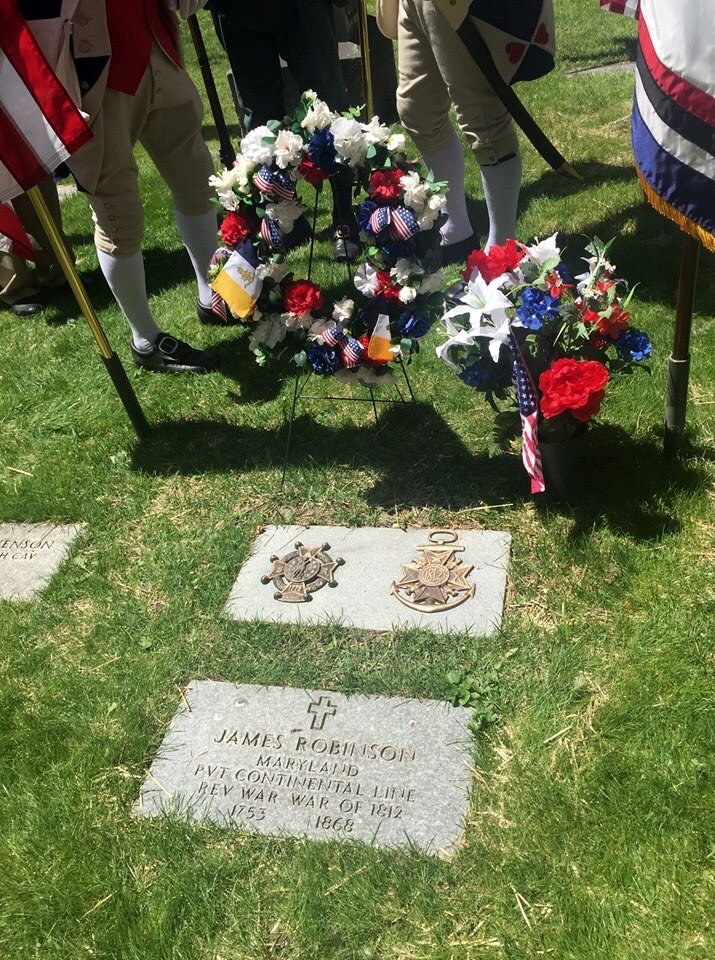
Rev. James Robinson's grave after the marking and dedication ceremony.

On June 22, 2019, a joint grave marking ceremony was held at Elmwood Cemetery by the Michigan societies of the Sons of the American Revolution and General Society of the War of 1812. Military honors with assistance from the American Legion were conducted 151 years after his death. Many dignitaries spoke including U.S. Representative Rashida Tlaib and Maj. Gen. Leonard Isabelle of the Michigan Air National Guard and Sen. Gary Peters provided a letter that was read. Tlaib had read Robinson's achievements into the U.S. Congressional Record and presented a certificate which was sent to the National Mall Liberty Fund D.C. The National Mall Liberty Fund D.C. is working to build the National Liberty Memorial, which will memorialize the African American contribution to Independence.
