= Slave insurance in the United States =

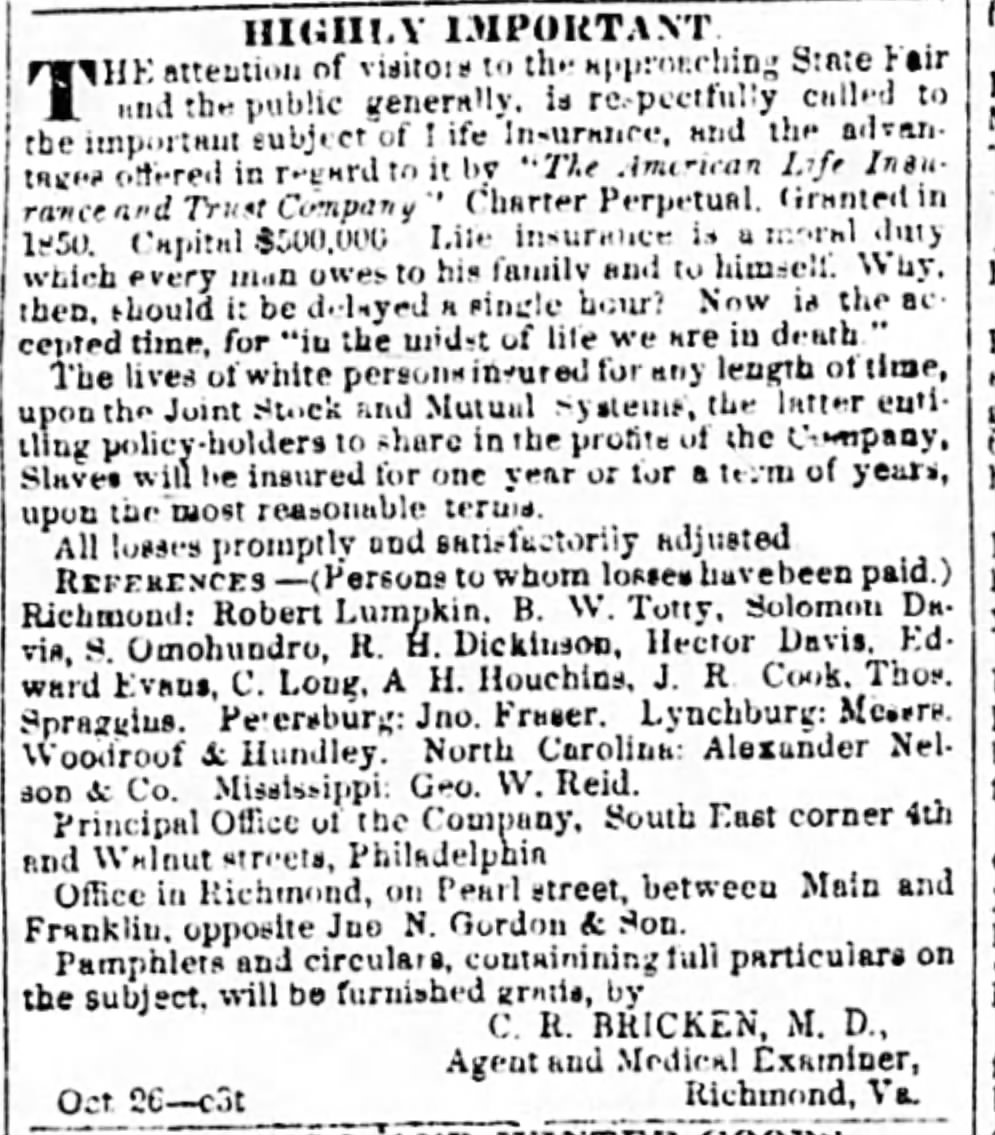
C. R. Bricken sold life insurance policies on both enslaved black people and free white people, and listed a number of notable slave traders (including Seth Woodroof, Robert Lumpkin, Silas Omohundro, Hector Davis, Solomon Davis, and R. H. Dickinson) as references to whom "losses had been paid" (Richmond Enquirer, November 6, 1855)

Slave insurance in the United States became an increasingly significant industry after the Act Prohibiting Importation of Slaves, a federal law which took effect in 1808, prevented any new slaves from being imported to the U.S. Existing slaves, especially skilled workers, therefore became more valuable, and were often rented out to businesses; slave owners insured against the death or loss of these rented-out slaves. Industries which rented insured skilled slaves from their owners included blacksmithing, carpentry, railroad construction, coal mining, and steamboat operations, and insured rented slaves also included firemen and cooks. Chinese slaves, called "coolies", were also insured.

The subject of slave insurance in the United States has become a matter of historical and legislative interest. In the history of slavery in the United States, a number of insurance companies wrote policies insuring slave owners against the loss, damage, or death of their slaves. The fact that a number of insurers continue the businesses that serviced these policies has brought attention to this history.

Attorney Deadria Farmer-Pallmann discovered an 1852 circular that named insurers that serviced some of these policies. National Loan Fund Life Assurance Company distributed a circular entitled. "A Method by Which Slave Owners May Be Protected From Loss" which named The Merchants Bank and The Leather Manufactures Bank as institutions able to pay and adjust claims. Under a typical policy a slave could be insured for $500.00 with an annual premium of about $11.25.

Slave insurance was advertised in Tennessee as a service for owners whose slaves worked in any industry including domestic service, hospitality, agriculture, manufacturing, or transportation. In 1859, the Nashville Commercial Insurance Company offered to insure "Negroes against the risks of the River."

A lawsuit resolved in 1870 addressed the issue of debt for an enslaved person purchased on credit, after an insurance company refused to pay out on a property insurance claim, since the slave had committed suicide after being put in a slave mart in New Orleans. The court determined that the debt was still owed, but removed the interest payment obligation.

== Disclosure legislation ==
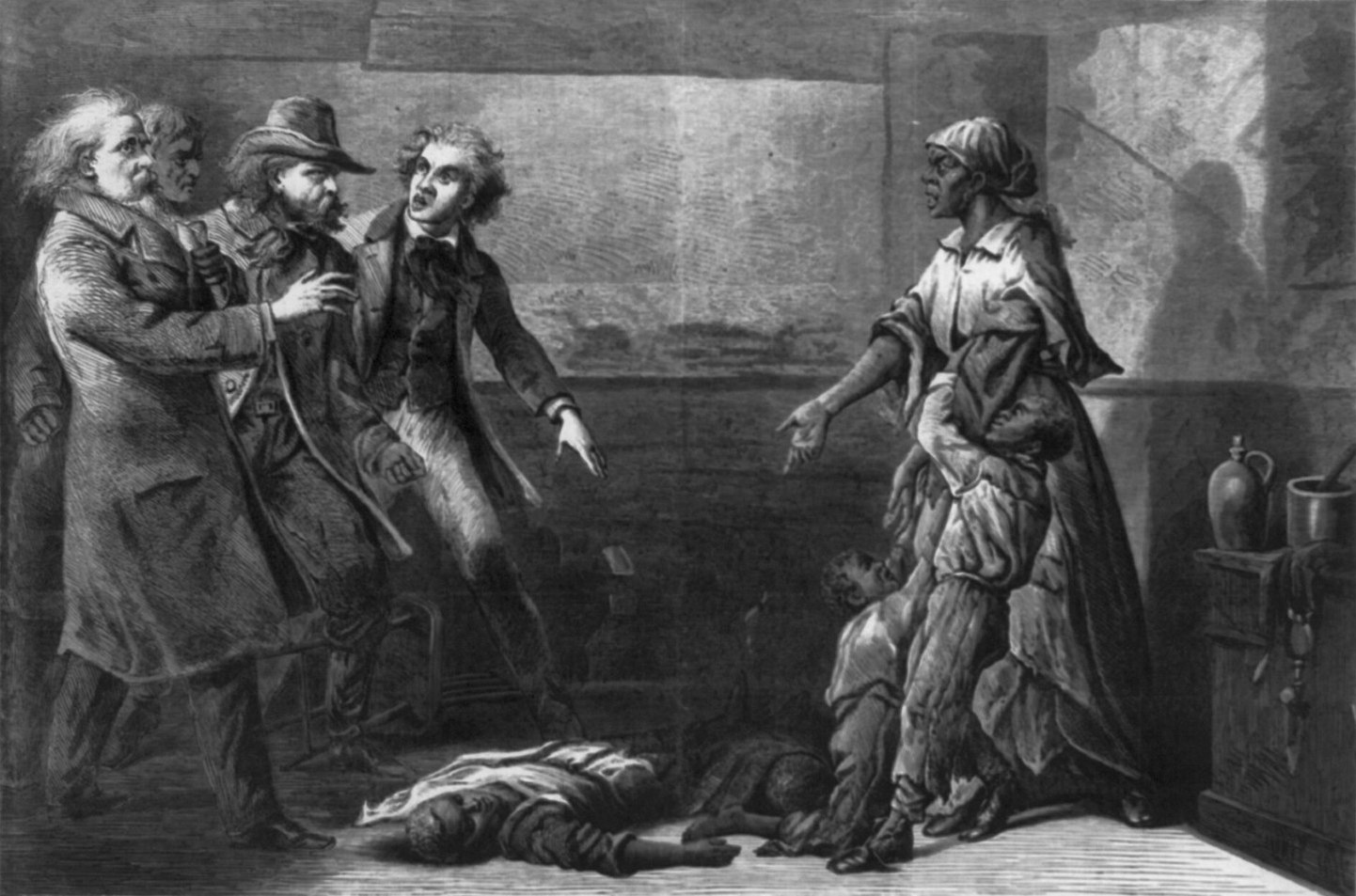
The Modern Medea (1867), an illustration of Margaret Garner, an escaped enslaved African American who in 1856, about to be captured, killed her daughter, Mary, to ensure Mary was not returned to slavery

On September 30, 2000, Governor Gray Davis of California signed two bills relating to slave insurance. One bill was written by former California State Senator Tom Hayden. The California legislature found that:

[I]nsurance policies from the slavery era have been discovered in the archives of several insurance companies, documenting insurance coverage for slaveholders for damage to or death of their slaves, issued by a predecessor insurance firm. These documents provide the first evidence of ill-gotten profits from slavery, which profits in part capitalized insurers whose successors remain in existence today.

The California insurance commissioner has the power to request slave insurance policies from insurance companies doing business in California.

A second bill, which is called UC Slavery Colloquium Bill (SB 111737) allows the University of California the option to hold a conference on the economics of slavery. Important organizations such as Jesse Jackson's Rainbow/PUSH and the NAACP supported these bills.

In California and other states calls have been made to verify any documents that showed profits from slavery on the part of capitalized insurers whose successors remain in existence today.

Part of Governor Davis' Bill included: 13810 The Commissioner shall request and obtain information in the state regarding any records of slave-holder insurance. Next the Commissioner shall obtain the names of any slave holders or slaves described in the insurance records. Also each insurer licensed and doing business in the state must show any insurance policies issued to slave-holders that provided coverage for damage to or death to their slaves. Last any slaves whose ancestors' owners were compensated for damages by insurers are entitled to full disclosure. Articles 12810, 13811, 13812, 13813 part of the California Code of Regulations, Tile 10, Sections 2393-2398 implement the statute.

While researching coal mining history, an author recently discovered additional information regarding the use of life insurance policies for coal mining slaves. "These policies provided a risk-free opportunity for the owners to lease slaves; but it was far from risk-free for the slaves who were forced to work in the extremely hazardous conditions of the mines." Insurance companies even wrote policies on 12-year-old slaves who labored underground in the mines.

== Slave mortgage ==
A slave mortgage was a financial instrument used by financiers wherein money was lent on the basis of the value of enslaved people. There are records of slave mortgages in the United States (Louisiana, South Carolina, and Virginia) and in South Africa. According to scholar Bonnie Martin, "the time lag between the recording of mortgages and foreclosures, when added to the dispersed nature of the mortgage recording process, made this financial engine relatively invisible, allowing potentially large economic and human consequences to remain unrecognized." As historian Calvin Schermerhorn put it, slave mortgages "drew equity out of [slave] bodies to reinvest in [sugar] refinement technology and more enslaved workers". Settlers fleeing a slave mortgage crisis was one of the precipitating factors of the American colonization of the Republic of Texas in the 1830s.

== See also ==
- Sklavenkasse
- Zong massacre
- Slave mortgage
- Creole case
- Abolitionism in the United States
- Atlantic Creole
- Biography and the Black Atlantic
- Colonial history of the United States
- Female slavery in the United States
- History of slavery in Connecticut
- History of slavery in Florida
- History of slavery in Georgia
- History of slavery in Maryland
- History of slavery in Massachusetts
- Nadir of American race relations
- Abolition of slavery timeline
- American Descendants of Slavery (ADOS)
- Glossary of American slavery

== Sources ==
- "Slavery Era Insurance Registry". California Department of Insurance.
- McElrath, Jessica. "Slave Insurance Policies Uncovered". AfroAmHistory.About.com. Archived from the original on January 29, 2007.
- Carey, Bill (2018). Runaways, Coffles and Fancy Girls: A History of Slavery in Tennessee. Nashville, Tennessee: Clearbrook Press. ISBN 978-0-9725680-4-3. LCCN 2018903570. OCLC 1045068878.
- Murphy, Sharon Ann (Winter 2005). "Securing Human Property Slavery, Life Insurance, and Industrialization in the Upper South". Journal of the Early Republic. 25 (4): 615–652. doi:10.1353/jer.2005.0081. S2CID 154350939.
