= Seth Woodroof =

American slave trader (~1805–1875)

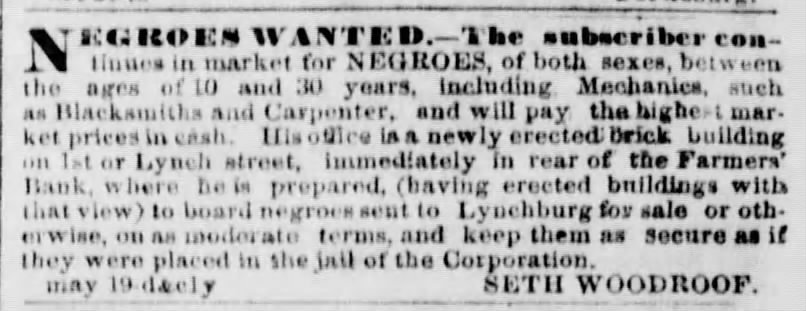
- Lynchburg Daily Virginian, October 23, 1856
- Born: c. 1805; Virginia
- Died: August 4, 1875; Lynchburg, Virginia
- Occupations: Slave trader, owner of Woodroof's jail

Seth Woodroof (c. 1805 – August 4, 1875) was a slave trader based in Lynchburg in central Virginia, United States. He was an interstate trader who ran what the Lynchburg Museum called the "most active and infamous" slave pen in the city. He is believed to have been actively trading from approximately 1830 until the beginning of the American Civil War in 1861. Woodroof sat on the Lynchburg city council from 1858 to 1865.

== Biography ==
=== Early life and family ===
Seth Woodroof was born about 1805 in Virginia. He was the son of Jesse Woodroof and Rhoda Pettyjohn, and a Virginian on both sides; Woodroof's family background is fairly well-attested, in part due to a later lawsuit involving his maternal grandfather William Pettyjohn's 1822 will. Seth Woodruff's father Jesse Woodroof had a total of 12 children with four partners; Rhoda Pettyjohn, the second of Jesse Woodroof's four life companions, died in 1822.

Map of Virginia highlighting Lynchburg City

=== Slave trading and politics ===
Seth Woodroof worked as a slave dealer as early as 1830, when he was around 25 years old. At the time of the 1830 U.S. census, Seth Woodroof of Amherst County, Virginia was the "absentee owner" of seven enslaved people. In 1832, Woodroof was one of several commissioners appointed to manage the Harris Creek Manufacturing Company of Amherst County. On April 14, 1834, Mississippi court records show that Woodroof sold "two negroes, both slaves for life, Albert, a man aged about 28 years, and Amelia, his wife, a woman aged about 19 or 20 years" to the Doyal brothers in Natchez, Mississippi for $1,100.

The Jones Memorial Library in Lynchburg holds a notebook in their manuscript collection that was once kept by Woodroof. In 2023, the library transcribed and digitized the account book, which lists more than 200 enslaved persons by first and last names. The library has published a dataset and article about the account book with Enslaved.org and the Journal of Slavery and Data Preservation.

The library posted page images on FromthePage.com, a crowdsourced historical transcription site. The first two pages refer to slave-trading transactions made in March and April 1834. The final page is dated to 1834 and 1835 and records Woodroof's expenses ($340.75) to transport "33 negroes" from Lynchburg, Virginia from Natchez, Mississippi, a journey that took from January 17 to February 18. The third and fourth pages date back to 1840. Woodroof may have sold slaves in Natchez, perhaps at the Forks of the Road slave market, possibly in partnership with a man named Thomas Hundley, doing business as Woodroof & Hundley.

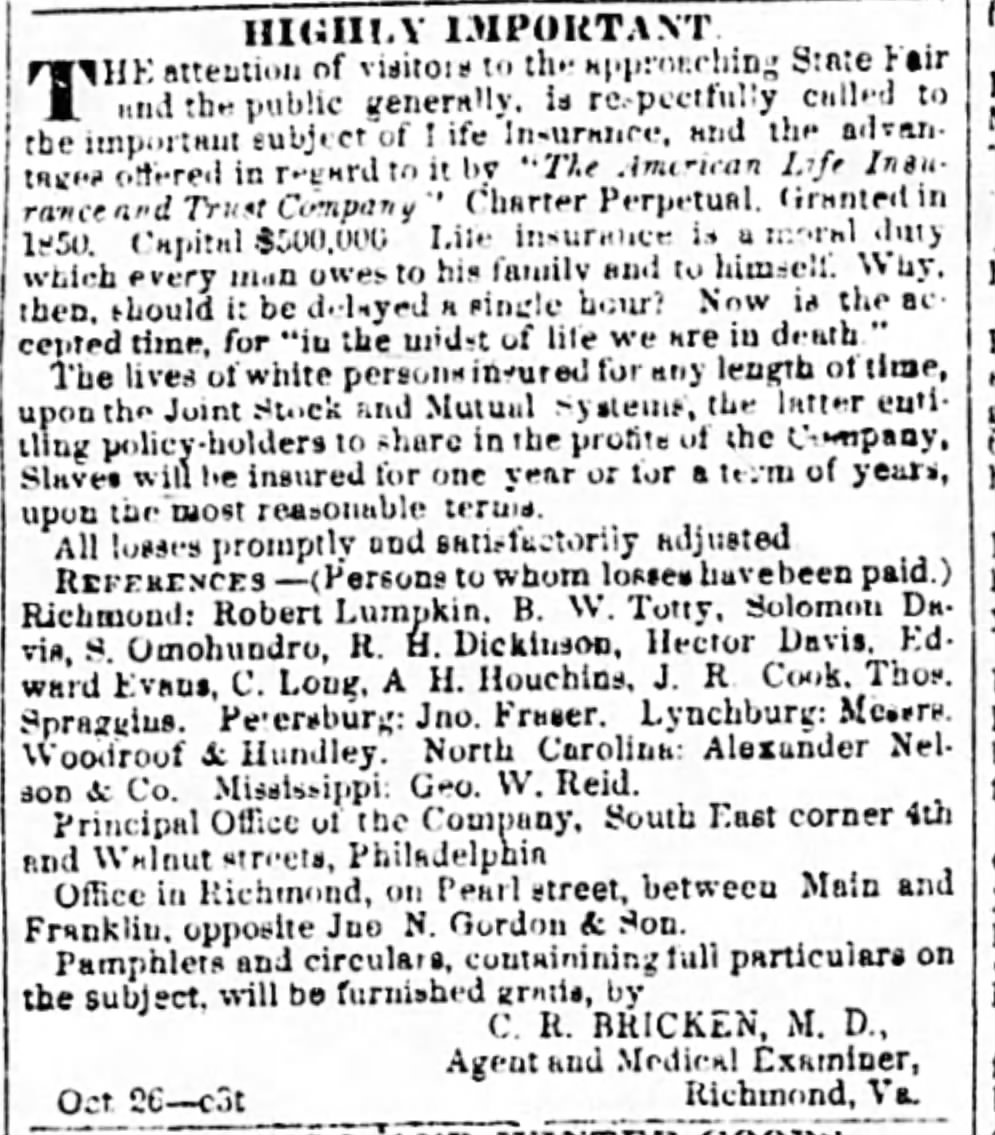
C. R. Bricken sold slave insurance, and listed a number of notable slave traders (including Seth Woodroof, Robert Lumpkin, Silas Omohundro, Hector Davis, Solomon Davis, and R. H. Dickinson) as references to whom "losses had been paid" (Richmond Enquirer, November 6, 1855)

At the time of the 1840 census of Amherst County, Virginia, Seth Woodroof was the head of a household consisting of four enslaved people, namely a female aged 24 to 35, a girl under 10, and two boys under 10. Seth Woodroof was also involved in horse racing in the 1840s, possibly running horses named Camillus and Chance. As a property-owning white adult male, Woodroof was legally permitted to participate in democratic processes in the U.S. state of Virginia in the early Republic era, and as such, Woodroof was one of several members of the Lynchburg Democratic Association elected to attend the 1848 state Democratic Party convention in the state capital, Richmond, Virginia. At the time of the 1850 U.S. census, Seth Woodroof of the town of Lynchburg, Virginia, was listed as the owner of 21 enslaved people, all male, aged 10 to 40, with the majority being in their teens and 20s. Of the 21, 18 were listed as black, and three were identified as mulatto.

Woodroof is believed to be referenced in a remarkable letter written in 1854 by an enslaved woman named Pen Taylor. The letter, preserved in the archives of Sweet Briar College, informed businessman, plantation owner, and former Lynchburg mayor Elijah Fletcher that she had been sold in Lynchburg, was being held in the slave jail of "Mr. Woodrough", and that she expected her jailor would soon ship her further south (where she could be sold at a higher price). Pen Taylor explained that Fletcher already owned her sister and requested that he purchase her: "buy me if you please. I shal Depend on you". Fletcher did indeed purchase Taylor; she became one of the 155 or so people he owned. (Note: For another case of a letter written by an enslaved person from within a slave trader's pen, see Samuel S. Boyd § Letters.) (Note: Approximately 50 years later, one of Fletcher's plantations would become the campus of Sweet Briar College.)

february the 16, 1854

Mr. Elijha fletcher, I write to you now for you to grant me a great favor which you will oblige me very much. I am now In the hands of Mr. Woodrough and I expect to start very soon too the south if you will not oblige me as much as to buy me. I would be very glad if you would. I was a servant of captain Edmond pen. A sister of Mary which you own. Martha pen. I was sold in Lynchburg when Mr. george Payne went away please to Answer it as soon as you can and buy me if you please. I shal Depend on you.

Martha Pen your humble servant Lynchburg Va.

— Martha Penn ("Pen") Taylor to Elijah Fletcher, 16 February 1854 (Sweet Briar College Library Archives via Lynn Rainville's 2022 Invisible Founders)

According to Steven Deyle's Carry Me Back: The Domestic Slave Trade in American Life (2005), in 1856, Woodroof carried on a rivalry of some kind with Richmond, Virginia slave trading firm Pullium & Davis, the principals of which were David M. Pulliam and Hector Davis: Per Deyle, "In a letter to his friend, the Richmond auctioneer Richard Dickinson, Woodroof noted how several agents for the Richmond firm of Pulliam & Davis were 'determined to Give me and you Hell & Rub it in.' Woodroof assured his friend not to worry, however, as he was "laying low & giving it to them when ever I can get to them.' He also added, 'If I only had my health good I feal confident I would Eventually kill the Hole Party, & I will Bother them a great deal as it is'". In an earlier letter, Woodroof had reported to Dickinson that there was evidence of sexually transmitted infections "in slaves he was shipping and on that basis advocated delaying their sale".

=== American Civil War and later life ===
According to one history of Lynchburg, in the years immediately prior to the outbreak of the American Civil War, "Many great discussions were going on in regard to slavery, and questions connected with it. Lynchburg was deeply interested in it, but was not as much exercised over it as the abolitionists were. Little apprehension was felt that the property in slaves was in danger. The buying and selling of negroes was going on as if nothing was being said. The 'nigger-traders' were coming and going, and Woodruff's jail, on Lynch street, between Ninth and Tenth, where the traders kept their slaves, was well patronized. Some feared trouble, but if it came, it would be in the next generation".

At the time of the 1860 U.S. census, Woodroof was listed as a resident of Lynchburg, Virginia. He lived with Supra C. Woodroof (who was likely his father's youngest son by another mother), and 16-year-old mulatto laborer by the name of Am. Morgan. At that time Woodroof, occupation farmer, owned real estate valued at $20,300 and personal property (including slaves) valued at $85,000. Woodroof appears on the 1860 slave schedules twice: He is listed as the owner of a 26-year-old black female who is employed by William R. Robinson, and of 43 people ranging in age from eight months to 45 years old. (The former is likely a case of hiring out a slave, the latter is likely an enumeration of the prisoners of Woodroof's jail.) In April 1861, as Virginia departed the United States for the Confederate States, Woodroof wrote Richmond traders Dickinson, Hill & Co. about the rapidly collapsing market for slaves, asking whether he could sell at "any price".

Seth Woodroof served on the Lynchburg city council immediately before and during the American Civil War, for the years 1858, 1859, 1860, and during the Confederate era of 1861, 1862, 1863, 1864, and 1865.

In August 1865 Seth Woodroof received a presidential pardon for his involvement in the rebellion against the U.S. government. In 1868, Woodroof signed a letter supporting a Conservative Congressman named Robert Ridgway.

After the war Woodroof seemingly transformed his slave trading business into a bank and brokerage, eventually in partnership with a man named William Q. Spence (doing business as Woodroof & Spence). Woodroof was enumerated in the 1870 census of Lynchburg as a 64-year-old banker and broker who was sharing his home with S. C. Woodroof, who was likely his younger half-brother. He owned real estate worth $20,500 and personal wealth worth $18,000. In 1871, Woodroof & Spence lost $600 to a criminal forger.

At the time of Woodroof's death, Woodroof & Spence was in debt, while Woodroof had a net worth of about US$3,000 (equivalent to $87,955 in 2025). Woodroof never married and had no acknowledged children. He died in Lynchburg in 1875 at age 70 of an ulcer of the bowels.

== Slave jail ==
Historian Frederic Bancroft reported in Slave-Trading in the Old South that "In the little city of Lynchburg four traders George Davis, M. Hart, E. Myers, and Seth Woodroof were advertising in the Christmas (1845) and other numbers of the Lynchburg Republican, and auctioneer Charles Phelps was selling slaves both privately and publicly...Woodroof sought from 75 to 150 between the ages of 10 and 25, later extended to 30. By 1852 he had erected a brick building on First or Lynch street, behind the Farmers' Bank, where he would 'board negroes sent to Lynchburg for sale or otherwise on as moderate terms, and keep them as secure, as if they were placed in the jail of the Corporation.' This shows that it was customary for traders to keep their slaves in the public jail, where they were treated much like felons". (Note: Woodroof's competitors Davis and Hart later joined forces to become the Lynchburg slave- trading firm of Hart & Davis.)

According to The Negro in Virginia, "Lynchburg during the pre-war years was an important tobacco market, and the lure of tobacco auctions was rivaled on Saturday nights only by the fascination of seeing human beings bought and sold." The slave trade in Lynchburg was comparatively decentralized, with advertised sales taking place at taverns, inns, and outside the Ninth Street market house. Woodroof's building was considered a valuable addition to this landscape since "slaveowners frequently sent many of the slaves bought in Lynchburg elsewhere in the country, and alternately, people also sent slaves to Lynchburg for others to sell...in 1852 Woodruff constructed a building on Lynch Street, between Ninth and Tenth Streets, to serve as a boarding house for slaves before their owners sent them to other parts of the country. Soon known as 'Woodruff's Jail,' this establishment was extremely popular among slave traders in Lynchburg until the beginning of the Civil War."

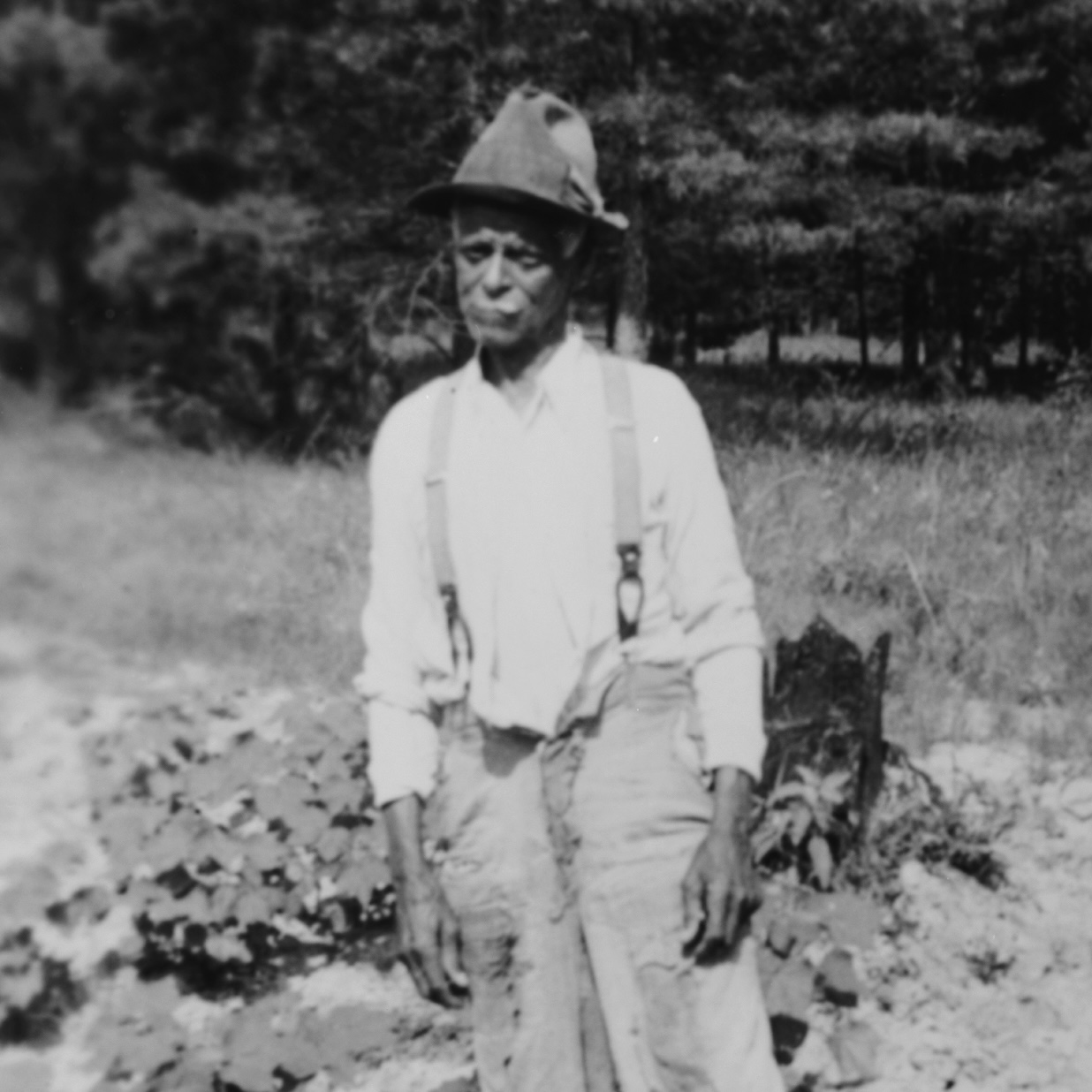
Charley Miller photographed in Texas on August 3, 1937

In 1937, a formerly enslaved man named Charley Miller was interviewed as part of the New Deal-era WPA Slave Narratives project. Miller had lived near the Sabine River in Texas for 50 years but had grown up in Lynchburg, Virginia, and recalled Woodroof's presence in the city: "Lynchburg was good-sized when war come on and Woodruff's nigger-tradin' yard was 'bout the bigges' thing there. It was all fenced in and had a big stand in middle of where they sold the slaves. They got a big price for 'em and handcuffed and chained 'em together and led 'em off like convicts. That yard was full of Louisiana and Texas slave buyers mos' all the time. None of the niggers wanted to be sold to Louisiana, 'cause that's where they beat 'em till the hide was raw, and salted 'em and beat 'em some more". (Note: Salting was the well-attested practice of putting salt brine, hot sauce, turpentine or some other acidic liquid on the open wounds of an enslaved person who had been whipped with a cat o' nine tails or similar tool.)

== Legacy ==
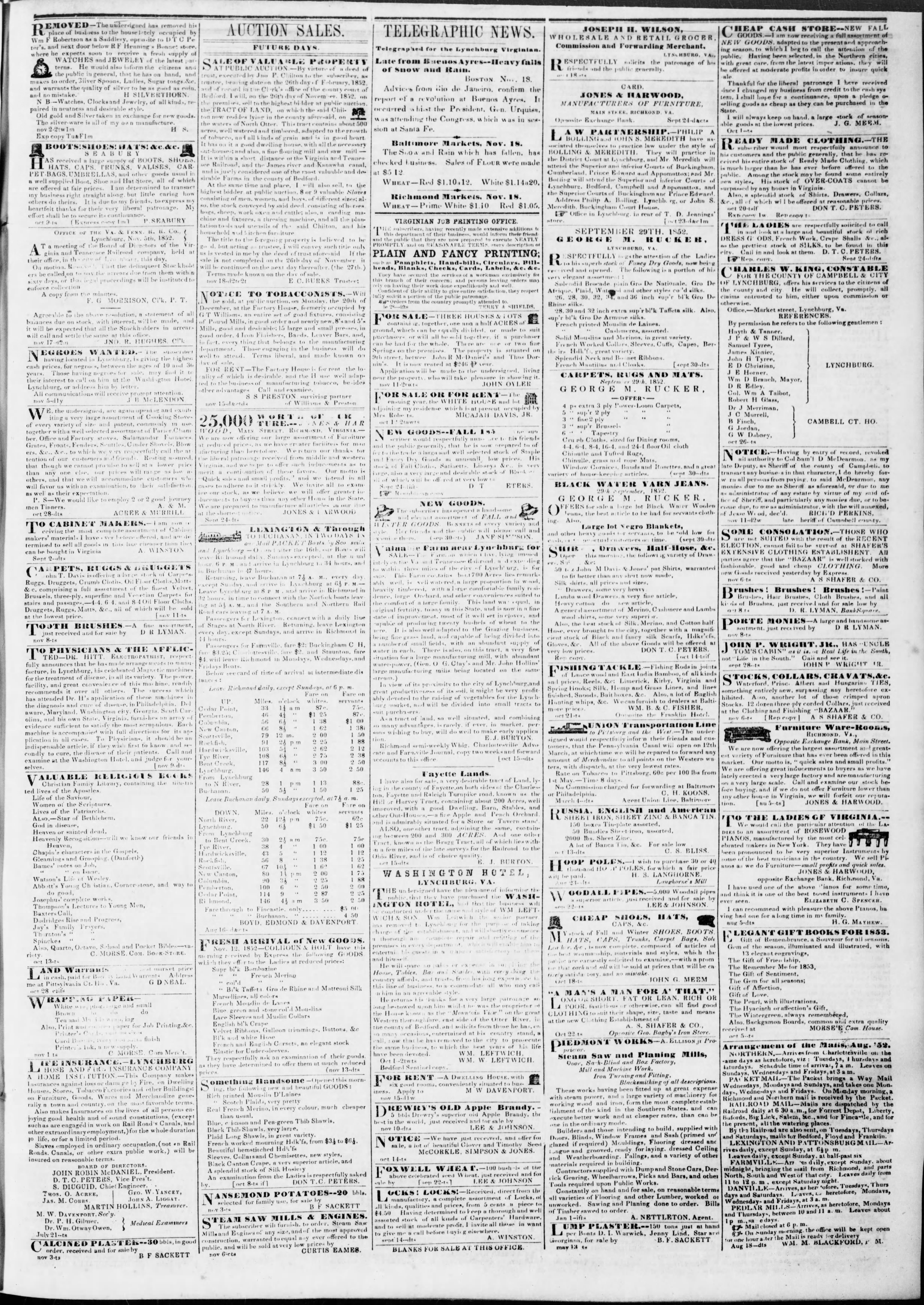
Stowe quoted from Woodroof's ad in column five of page two of the Lynchburg Daily Virginian of Friday, November 19, 1852; J. B. McLendon's ad appeared on page three

One of Woodroof's frequent advertisements was featured in Harriet Beecher Stowe's 1853 non-fiction polemic, A Key to Uncle Tom's Cabin, in a chapter on the topic of family separation in American slavery.

Mr. McLendon distinctly announces that he is not going to take any children under ten years of age, nor any grown people over thirty. Likely young negroes are what he is after:—families, of course, never separated! Again, in the same paper, Mr. Seth Woodroof is desirous of keeping up the recollection in the community that he also is in the market, as it would appear he has been sometime past. He, likewise, wants negroes between ten and thirty years of age; but his views turn rather on mechanics, blacksmiths, and carpenters...There is no manner of doubt that this Mr. Seth Woodroof is a gentleman of humanity, and wishes to avoid the separation of families as much as possible. Doubtless he ardently wishes that all his blacksmiths and carpenters would be considerate, and never have any children under ten years of age; but, if the thoughtless dogs have got them, what's a humane man to do? He has to fill out Mr. This, That, and the Other's order,—that's a clear case; and therefore John and Sam must take their last look at their babies, as Uncle Tom did of his when he stood by the rough trundle-bed and dropped into it great, useless tears. Nay, my friends, don't curse poor Mr. Seth Woodroof, because he does the horrible, loathsome work of tearing up the living human heart, to make twine and shoe-strings for you! It's disagreeable business enough, he will tell you, sometimes; and, if you must have him to do it for you, treat him civilly, and don't pretend that you are any better than he."

== See also ==
- List of American slave traders
- Slave markets and slave jails in the United States
- History of slavery in Virginia
- History of slavery in Mississippi
