= FromthePage.com =

Crowdsourced transcription platform

From the Page is a platform for crowdsourcing transcriptions of records of historical significance, particularly handwritten records that are less easily transcribed by optical character recognition, etc. Archives, special collections, state and provincial archives, public libraries, and digital humanities projects upload scanned documents to FromthePage.com; volunteers then transcribe, review, correct, and comment on the material as needed. FromthePage.com was launched in 2005 by two Rice University computer science alumni with an interest in family history. The founders were inspired in part by "their involvement in Wikipedia's early days". As of 2023, 2.1 million pages had been transcribed by volunteers for 110 participating institutions.

The platform has been used by Colorado State University Libraries, East Hampton Library's special collection of Long Island material, Harvard's Colonial North America project, Indiana State Archives, Maryland State Archives, the Nantucket Historical Society's archive of American whaling, and University of Southern Mississippi's Civil War & Reconstruction Governors of Mississippi project. The business records of American slave traders Rice C. Ballard and Seth Woodroof are among the many transcription projects of public interest hosted by the site.
