= 1855 Camden & Amboy rail accident =

Fatal train derailment on the Camden & Amboy Line

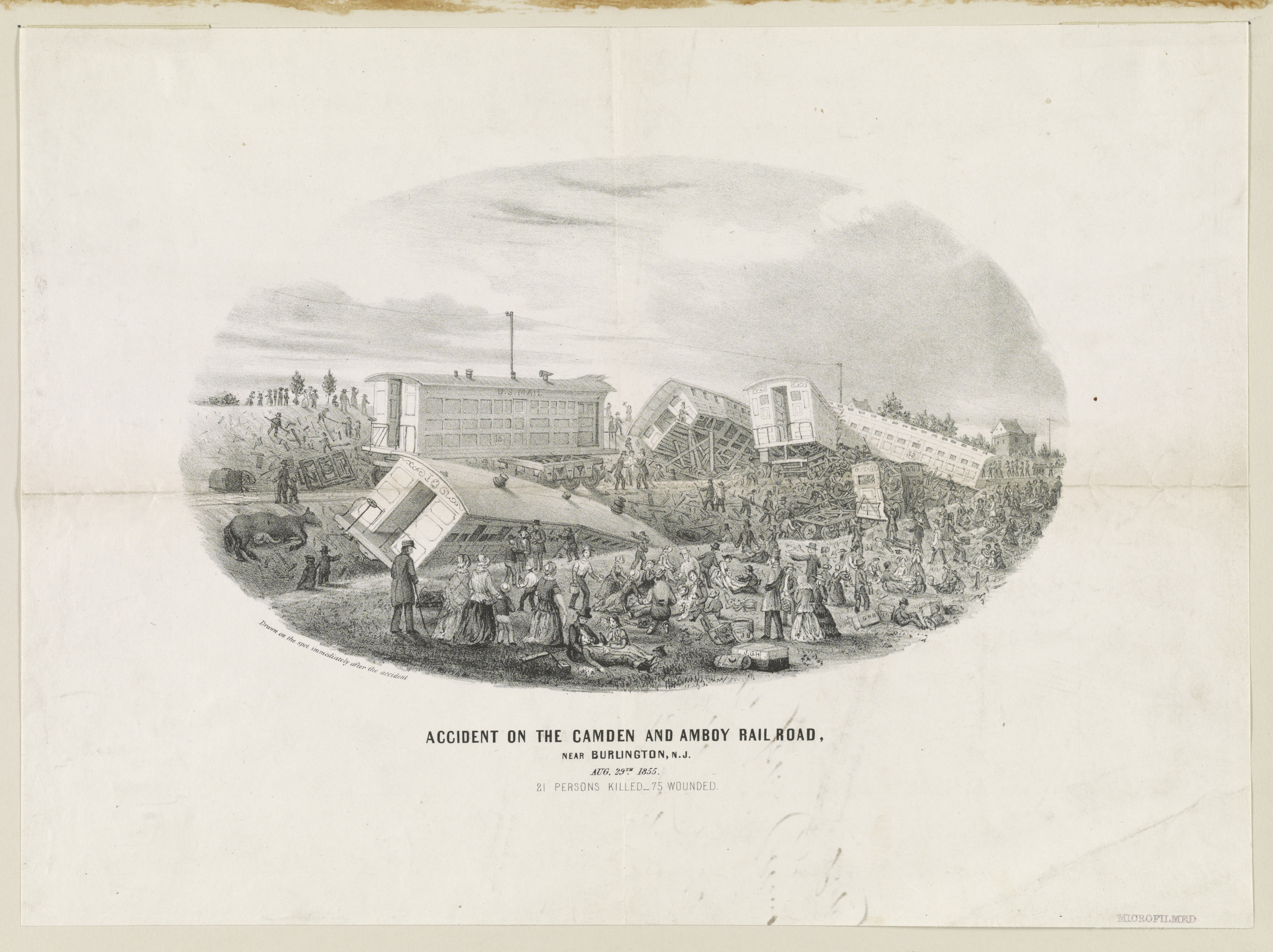
- Drawing of the accident

Details
- Date: August 29, 1855; 11:02 a.m.
- Location: Near Burlington, New Jersey
- Coordinates: 40°05′15″N 74°49′53″W
- Line: Camden & Amboy Railway
- Operator: Camden & Amboy
- Incident type: Derailment
- Cause: Collision with horse-drawn carriage while reversing

Statistics
- Trains: 1
- Passengers: 193
- Deaths: 24; plus two horses
- Injured: 80

The 1855 Camden & Amboy rail accident was a derailment that took place near Burlington, New Jersey on August 29, 1855. While attempting to avoid collision with another train, a Philadelphia-bound express was reversing when it collided a horse-drawn cart resulting in the rear passenger train coaches to derail and shatter into pieces. 24 people would die as a result of the crash.

== Background ==
Two trains were involved in the accident. The first train involved was a train that had left from New York City at 8:00 a.m. en route to Philadelphia. The other train was a Philadelphia passenger that had left at 10:00 a.m. that was sharing the same line as the New York, but going in the opposite direction.

== Accident ==
At 11:02 a.m., near Burlington, New Jersey the Philadelphia train noticed the oncoming New York train and braked to prevent a head-on collision. After coming to a complete stop, the Philadelphia train then began to reverse in an effort to pull into a siding so that the New York train could pass. As the Philadelphia train reversed, it struck a horse-drawn carriage, instantly killing the horses, but also damaging the train's axles. The carriage itself was being driven by a doctor who managed to escape the wreck.

The engineer, unaware of what had just happened, resumed reversing the train, but at this point, the back-most coaches, including an emigrant car began to derail. As the wooden cars began to derail, they started getting smashed into each other which would be the primary cause of the fatalities. Four coaches would derail in total.

=== Response ===
Residents and farmers from the town of Burlington, as well as those who were uninjured in the crash, quickly emerged on scene and started removing the dead and injured from the wreckage. Doctors as far away as Philadelphia were dispatched. A special train from Mount Holly was also dispatched to carry the injured closer to Burlington where the homes of residents were used for medical treatment. The dead were collected and placed at the Burlington Town Hall.

=== Casualties ===
A total of 24 passengers would die as a result of the crash. Eyewitness reports described a grim scene of mangled bodies that were shredded and torn up in some cases. The majority of the dead were reported to be male, with a total of four women perishing in the disaster. Around 80 others were wounded. Among the dead were Mississippi plantation owner John Field Gillespie, one of the Natchez nabob class, and his wife Susan Smith.

== Aftermath ==
=== Legal response ===
The immediate trial following the derailment was plagued with several legal issues. The doctor who was believed to responsible for the crash could not be located in the days following the accident, delaying the investigation. The court and jury would also sustain issues such as the foreman of the jury later being revealed to have been a passenger on the train and another juror being a Camden & Amboy stockholder. The doctor, John F. D. Heineken, would receive partial blame for his carriage being on the tracks at the time, but the majority of the fault would be placed on the brakeman of the train for his failure to prevent the collision. Three of the jurors refused to agree with the verdict; one of these three was the stockholder. The Camden & Amboy rail company would compensate the victims with half a million dollars.

=== Safety improvements ===
This accident, as well as the Great Train Wreck of 1856 were instrumental cases in improving rail safety. Train companies and rail lines began expanding their fixed plant to double-track railroad systems, in which opposite-direction trains typically traveled on different tracks. Automatic Train Stop (ATS) systems would also be implemented 25 years later to help prevent further collisions.
