= Rice C. Ballard =

American slave trader (~1798–1860)

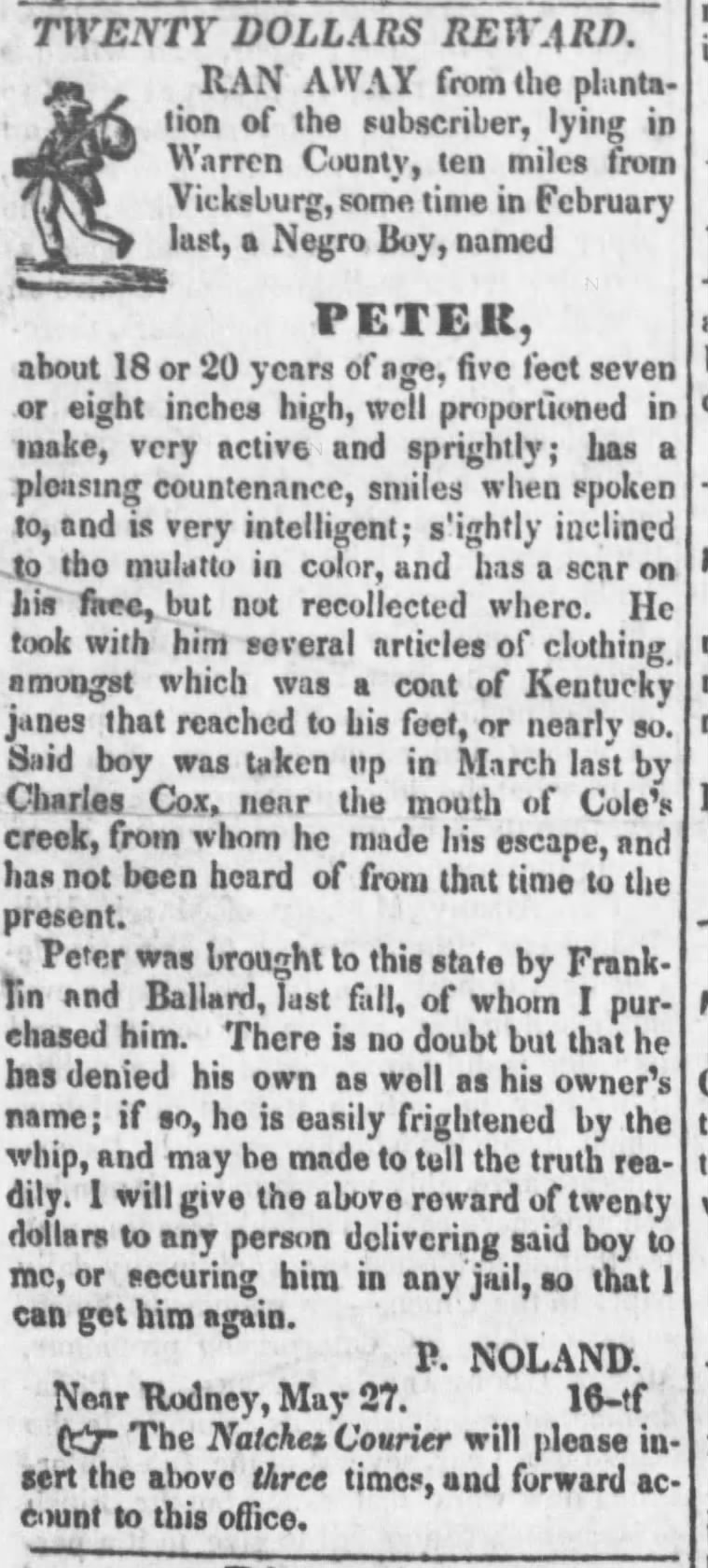
Franklin & Ballard trafficked Peter to Mississippi in the fall of 1835

Rice Carter Ballard (c. 1798 – August 31, 1860) was a 19th-century American slave trader, plantation owner, and cotton merchant. His slave trading partners were Isaac Franklin and John Armfield. After leaving the slave-trading business, Ballard invested his profits in land and slaves. Together Ballard and his investment partner Samuel S. Boyd owned about 500 people in 1860. The University of North Carolina holds an archive of Ballard's correspondence and business that has been uploaded to FromthePage.com, a crowdsourced transcription platform.

== Trading ==
According to historian Calvin Schermerhorn, "Rice Ballard's paid agents included James G. Blakey, Andrew Grimm, Silas Omohundro, and Benjamin Parks. They scoured the backcountry for young, fit, able, and salable enslaved people."

== Legacy ==
An obituary in the Louisville (Ky.) Courier-Journal praised him effusively, describing him as "emphatically a man of the strictest integrity, of the most generous, confiding, and reliable friendships, and of the most liberal and judicious benevolence. Distress and want never appealed to him in vain. Unassuming in manner, unostentatious in habit, with few and simple wants, the chief gratification his large wealth gave him was that it enabled him to serve friends, relieve the poor, and solace the wretched. By these he can never be forgotten. In their hearts his memory will be kept green forever." His descendants today are horrified and ashamed of his legacy, and delight in the fact he would no longer recognize the people who share his name.

Joshua C. Rothman presented a different perspective in his 2021 history The Ledger and the Chain: "Few slave traders were more successful, and none were more influential, than Isaac Franklin, John Armfield, and Rice Ballard...their company was among the most formidable businesses in the South...from Alexandria and Richmond to Natchez and New Orleans, Franklin, Armfield, and Ballard controlled the fates of thousands of enslaved people...Their America incentivized entrepreneurialism, financial risk, and racial slavery, and no one made more of the junction among those things than they did...Their professional dominance came in part from their command of the intimate daily savageries of the slave trade. Franklin, Armfield, and Ballard immersed themselves without hesitation in the routine brutalities and coldhearted violence of their work."

== See also ==
- List of American slave traders
- List of white American slave traders who had mixed-race children with enslaved black women
- Bibliography of the slave trade in the United States
