= Calvin Smith (Mississippi) =

Settler and plantation owner (1768–1840)

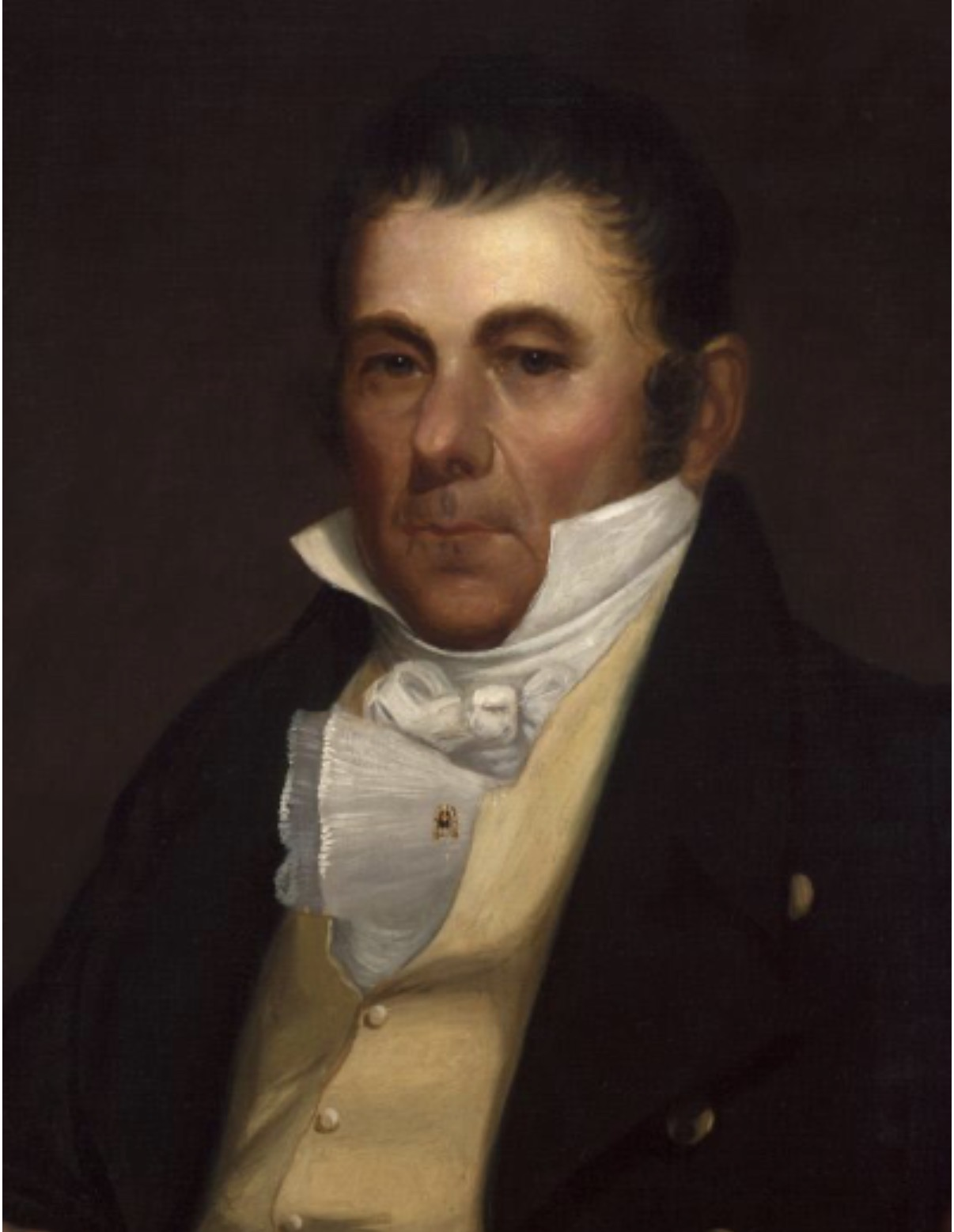
Calvin Smith, painted 1824 by Bass Otis (Delaware Art Museum)

Calvin Smith (December 25, 1768 – November 7, 1840) was an American plantation owner. He was an early settler of the Natchez District of Mississippi and became a prosperous owner of plantations and slaves. One of the people he bought, James Robinson, described him extensively in a slave narrative published shortly before the American Civil War. Smith himself is a key primary source on the development of the Natchez District during the American Revolutionary War era and the late 18th century. Smith had a dozen children with his wife, two of whom married Gillespies, two of whom married Ferridays, and two of whom married Bennetts. The Gillespie families and the Ferriday families also owned large plantations in the lower Mississippi River valley.

== Life and career ==
He arrived in the Natchez District of British West Florida with his Loyalist parents in 1776. He was the 10th of 12 children. He received a land grant in 1791, and was one of three Smith brothers to marry one of three Cobb sisters of Wilkinson County. He eventually owned a 22-room house on a plantation called Retirement in the Second Creek neighborhood, about 10 miles below Natchez, Mississippi. He also owned or leased Springfield plantation for a time. He owned Monmouth from 1820 to 1826. He and his brothers had "founded large and influential families," and he became one of richest and most important planters in the region. He was suggested as a candidate for the U.S. Congress in 1820.

One of his slaves was James Robinson, an American Revolutionary War veteran from Maryland, who later published a slave narrative about his life. Robinson wrote:

Shortly after, another boatload of negroes came down to New Orleans, among whom was a cousin of mine, and he was bought by Calvin Smith, and brought to the same plantation. He arrived on the place in the afternoon, and was not initiated into the mysteries till next morning. Then, at day-break, the ceremony commenced, and he received nine-and-thirty, then sent into the field, where he worked that day and the next, ran away...and on Friday was brought back by Joseph, the colored driver. Then Calvin wrote a letter to Holdcloth, the overseer, ordering him to give my cousin five hundred lashes, salt him well, and make him drink a pint of salt and water. Joe, the colored driver, was the whipper. He called to Reed, another colored driver, to bring him a handful of cornshucks, a pitcher of water, and a bottle of brandy, of which he drank heartily, then commenced to set fire to the shucks, and burnt my cousin's bare flesh till it was a perfect crisp. He was then salted, and burnt again, and was then put into the stocks; stayed there Friday night; Saturday morning, was driven to the field...Monday morning, he was again driven to the field. Holdcloth, the overseer, said, 'Take that damned negro back, and put him in the stocks; get some elder and wild coffee, heat them together, and kill the vermin that are in the damned negro's flesh.' He lived till Thursday evening in great agony, and died, having been on the place just one week."

There was a criminal inquest into the cousin's death. Smith denied writing the letter ordering the lashes and fired the overseer for having the temerity to produce the letter to the authorities. There were no consequences for either Smith or Holdcloth.

Smith was an early source on the history of Natchez, with his account of early settlements appearing in article by Mann Butler in the Western Messenger in 1838. When Smith died at his home in Mississippi in 1840 he was described in brief obituaries as "old and very respected" and as "one of the oldest and most highly respectable inhabitants" of Adams County, Mississippi. He was buried in the Ogden Cemetery on what had been Retirement Plantation, off Highway 61.

According to a 1915 history of the grand houses of Natchez, Calvin Smith's wife was Priscilla Cobb and "He owned many of the nearby plantations, and bestowed them upon his children when they married. His possessions included Woodlawn, Magnolia, and Egypt. The Calvin Smiths had three sons and seven daughters. Two of the daughters married Gillespies, two married Ferridays, and two married Bennetts. An Indian encampment was near Retirement, and their trail passed near the front gate. Mr. Smith's relations with the Indians were most friendly. Many men were attracted to this land of promise. About 1830 Edwin Ruthven Bennett and Henry Lyle Bennett came to the Natchez hills. They were sons of Caleb Bennett, first governor of Delaware after the revolution, and a member of Washington's staff...These two brothers married Mr. Smith's daughters, Louisa and Matilda. Louisa was the youngest child, and inherited Retirement from her parents. About 1845 it was planned to repair the old home. The first cabin had been added to room by room, and was at that time a large, comfortable house. The foundations of the house were found so dilapidated it was decided to rebuild on the same spot. The house was completed just before the civil war" and survived until a fire 1904 destroyed the building and all its contents.

Smith's daughter Susan (1796–1855) was married in 1815 to John Field Gillespie.

== See also ==
- Philander Smith

== Sources ==
- James, D. Clayton (1993) [1968]. Antebellum Natchez. Baton Rouge: Louisiana State University Press. ISBN 978-0-8071-1860-3. LCCN 68028496. OCLC 28281641.
