= John Field Gillespie =

American slave owner (1788–1855)

John Field Gillespie (May 8, 1788 – September 1, 1855) was a plantation and slave owner in Mississippi and Louisiana. He was a stockholder in at least two important antebellum Southern banks. He appears on William Johnson's 1837 list of Natchez nabobs. He reportedly had a number of mixed-race children by slaves he owned and raped; one of these sons served as the family carriage driver. Gillespie and his legal wife were killed in a train wreck in New Jersey in 1855.

== Biography ==
Gillespie was born at Nashville in the Mero District settlement of North Carolina in 1788, his parents having migrated there from Virginia. He moved to the Feliciana District of Spanish West Florida in 1810 "and engaged in the mercantile business." In 1810, as a resident of St. Francisville, he endorsed the West Florida Rebellion that sought to unify the so-called Florida Parishes with the United States at the expense of Spain. He was said to be "at the capture of Baton Rouge from the Spaniards, and was also one of the defenders of New Orleans in 1814–15."

Gillespie was married in 1815 to Susan Smith (1796–1855), daughter of Mississippi planter Calvin Smith, who settled in the district with his family when it was British West Florida. James Robinson, who was enslaved by Smith beginning in approximately 1795, described Gillespie and his brother James Alcorn Gillespie (also married to a Smith daughter) in some detail. He reported that Gillespie had an extensive shadow family and that his mixed-race son Samuel Gillespie served as the family carriage driver.

In 1831 he was on the board of directors of the Bank of the United States branch at Natchez, in company with men like James C. Wilkins, Alvarez Fisk, Wm. Ferriday, John A. Quitman, Henry W. Vick, Thos. G. Ellis, and David Hunt. In 1836 two of John and Susan's sons drowned in Second Creek where they were swimming with one of their Routh cousins. Barber, diarist, and free man of color Walter Johnson included Gillespie on his 1837 list of influential Natchez nabobs. As of 1838 he was a reference for Jackson, Todd & Co., a company operated by merchant banker Washington Jackson. In 1839, his brother-in-law William Ferriday "mortgaged four plantations (Hollywood, Liverpool, Peachland, and Melody), plus 24,238 acres in Louisiana, Arkansas, and Mississippi, an estate residence and fourteen servants in Natchez, and 243 slaves as collateral for debts amounting to US$777,516 (equivalent to $23,507,710 in 2025). The lands and slaves were given in trust to local planter John F. Gillespie, who agreed to sell the properties at public auction at the door of the courthouse in Natchez."

He contributed $200 in "currency" to the 1840 Natchez tornado relief fund, and his brother J. A. Gillespie gave $250. In 1841 he and his brother were among those complaining about a Mississippi legislative act sustaining the will of Isaac Ross and the deportation of his manumitted slaves to Liberia. A cotton gin he operated in Concordia Parish burned in May 1842, "supposed to be work of an incendiary." He commissioned the Frogmore plantation house in 1843. According to a news report of 1889, in the 1840s Edwards Pierrepont was employed as a private tutor for Gillespie's children.

As of 1850 he owned at least two properties in Concordia Parish. He was also a large landholder in Tensas Parish. He resided in Adams County and reported owning real estate valued at US$25,000 (equivalent to $967,500 in 2025). He owned 182 slaves in Adams County in 1850.

Susan Smith and John F. Gillespie both died in 1855 from injuries suffered in the Camden & Amboy rail accident near Burlington, New Jersey. According to a news account from Memphis, Gillespie had "his left leg amputated and the right foot taken of by the recent railroad accident. His position is regarded as very critical. It is stated he made his will, wherein he disposes of property to the amount of US$600,000 (equivalent to $20,732,143 in 2025), and directs that in case of his death or that of his wife, the railroad company be prosecuted to the last cent of his fortune. [Mr. Gillespie has since died of his injuries.]"

In 1856 the U.S. Supreme Court rendered a decision about a lawsuit against the "late commercial bank of Natchez" of which Gillespie had been a stockholder. His "home plantation," Egypt plantation near Second Creek in Adams County, was listed for sale in 1857. Another one of his plantations may have been near Waterproof in Tensas Parish.

One of his sons, James M. Gillespie, went to Yale University, class of 1853. James Metcalf Gillespie (1832–1892) was 40th-largest slaveholder in Louisiana in 1860, with 269 people enslaved on a cotton plantation in Tensas Parish. One of J. F. Gillespie's daughters married a son of local planter Dr. James Metcalfe.

== Sources ==
- Scarborough, William Kauffman (2012) [2003]. Masters of the Big House: Elite Slaveholders of the Mid-Nineteenth-Century South. Baton Rouge: Louisiana State University Press. ISBN 9780807156001. LCCN 2003007301. OCLC 846496079. Project MUSE book 23668.
