= Task system =

Labor system in plantation slavery

The task system is a system of labor under slavery characteristic in the Americas. It is usually regarded as less brutal than other forms of enslaved persons' labor. Under this system, each enslaved person is assigned a specific task to complete for the day. After that task is finished, the enslaved person is then free to do as he or she wishes with the remaining time.

The other slavery system of labor, known as the gang system, was harsher. The gang system forced the enslaved people to work until the planter said they were finished and allowed them almost no freedom. Whether planters organized their enslaved people on the task or gang system had much to do with the type of crops they harvested. Tobacco, rice and sugar cultivation was organized into gangs since those crops required considerable processing and supervision. Coffee, cotton, and pimento were comparatively hardier plants where extensive supervision was unnecessary, leading planters to favor the task system on their plantations.

== See also ==
- Gang system
