= Gang system =

Labor system in plantation slavery

The gang system is a system of division of labor within slavery on a plantation. It is the more brutal of two main types of labor systems. The other form, known as the task system, was less harsh and allowed the slaves more self-governance than the gang system did. The gang system allowed continuous work at the same pace throughout the day. The first gang, or "great gang," was given the hardest work, for the fittest slaves. The second gang, consisting of less able slaves, was given lighter work, and the third gang was given the easiest work.

As an example, the planting gang in the McDuffie plantation was split into three classes (as quoted by Metzer):

- The 1st class, consisting of the best workers, "...those of good judgement and quick motion..."
- The 2nd class, who were the most inefficient and weakest.
- The 3rd class, made up of children.

The first class created small holes in the ground, spaced apart for cotton seeds. The second class then dropped cotton seeds in these holes and the 3rd class covered them with dirt.

In the United States, the gang system developed in the nineteenth century and is characteristic of the ante-bellum period (c. 1820–1865). It is especially associated with cotton production in the Deep South, but also is associated with tobacco and sugar production. Rice plantations in Carolina, for example, never adopted a gang system of labor. The idea of a gang system is that enslaved workers would work all day (traditionally, from sunrise to sunset) under the supervision of an overseer. Breaks for lunch and dinner were part of the system. This is opposed to the task system, under which the worker is released when his assigned task for the day is completed.

== See also ==
- Task system
