= Colonist car =

Type of railway passenger car

A colonist car (or emigrant car) was a type of railway passenger coach designed to provide inexpensive long-distance transportation for immigrants, mainly in North America. They were noted for their very spartan accommodation.

== History ==
Colonist cars emerged as a solution to the challenge of North American settlement in the mid- and late 19th century, as settlement areas grew in the western interior of the continent, thousands of miles from the seaports where most immigrants arrived. Colonist cars began in the 1840s as the cheapest form of transport for immigrants who could only afford basic fares. Initially, they provided only benches around the side of what were often boxcars, which could be converted to grain cars for return trips to the East Coast.

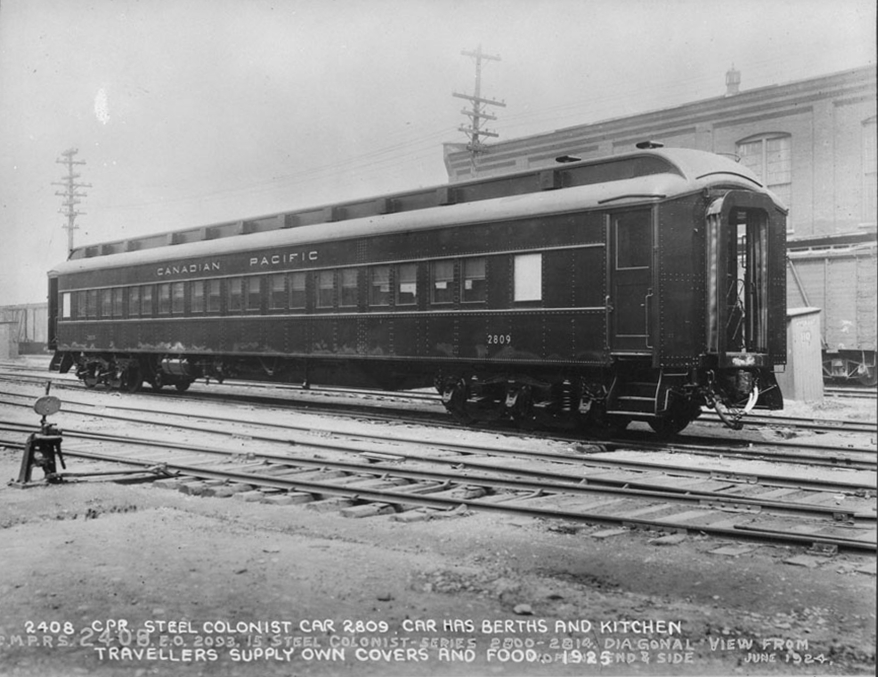
Canadian Pacific Railway colonist car No. 2809, 1924

By the 1880s, however, railways competing for immigrant traffic on longer routes to western North America developed specialized cars for immigrants, providing simple sleeping berths and cooking facilities. Early examples were introduced by the Central Pacific Railroad in 1879. By 1885, other western railways such as the Santa Fe, the Union Pacific, the Northern Pacific, the Great Northern Railway and the Canadian Pacific Railway had adopted the idea. The fleet of colonist cars at Canadian Pacific eventually grew to include over a thousand cars, providing basic sleeping accommodation to immigrants bound for Western Canada. These cars offered simple pull-down sleeping berths and kitchens where immigrant families could cook their own meals. Fares were very cheap; a family could cross Canada from Montreal for seven dollars, but immigrants had to provide their own food and bedding. Blankets, pillows, and food were all surcharges. Canadian Pacific's fleet of over a thousand colonist cars played a major role in settling Canadian West.

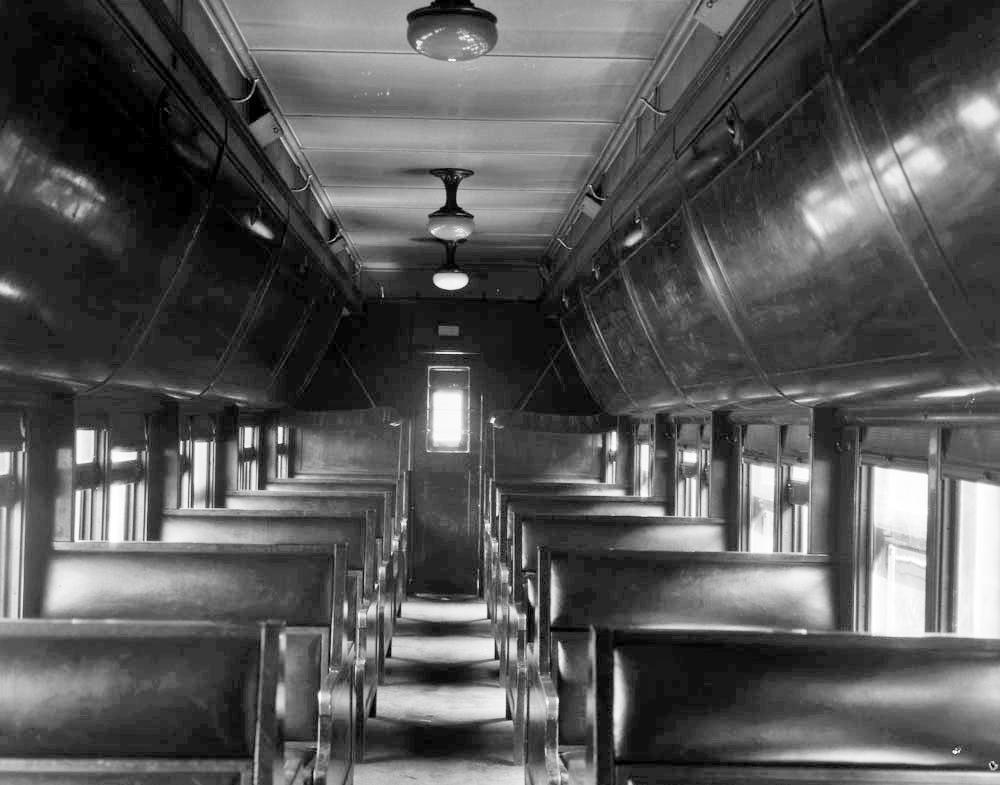
Interior of Canadian National Railways colonist car, 1926. Note lowered sleeping berths at end of car.

Rival Canadian railways such as the Intercolonial Railway and later the Canadian Northern Railway also built fleets of colonist cars in the peak years of immigration before World War I. Following immigration restrictions in the 1920s and a near-halt to immigration during the Great Depression, many colonist cars were converted to combine cars or work cars by the Canadian National Railway which inherited these fleets. They saw renewed use in World War II as troop cars, and surviving colonist cars were heavily utilized in the post-World War II boom in immigration. By the 1960s, most colonist cars were worn out and were replaced by standard passenger cars as demand for immigrant trains from seaports fell in the wake of increased air travel.

Today, two Canadian Pacific Railway colonist cars are preserved in Canada: one at the Calgary Heritage Park in Calgary, Alberta. and another at the West Coast Railway Association's museum in Squamish, British Columbia. Canadian National colonist cars are preserved at the Canada Science and Technology Museum in Ottawa, the Railway Museum of Eastern Ontario in Smiths Falls, Ontario and the New Brunswick Railway Museum in Hillsborough, New Brunswick. The Canadian Museum of Immigration at Pier 21 built a replica of a 1920s era colonist car, complete with immigrant luggage and cooking stove, as part of its 2015 expansion.
