= Shadow family =

Slavery-era cultural convention

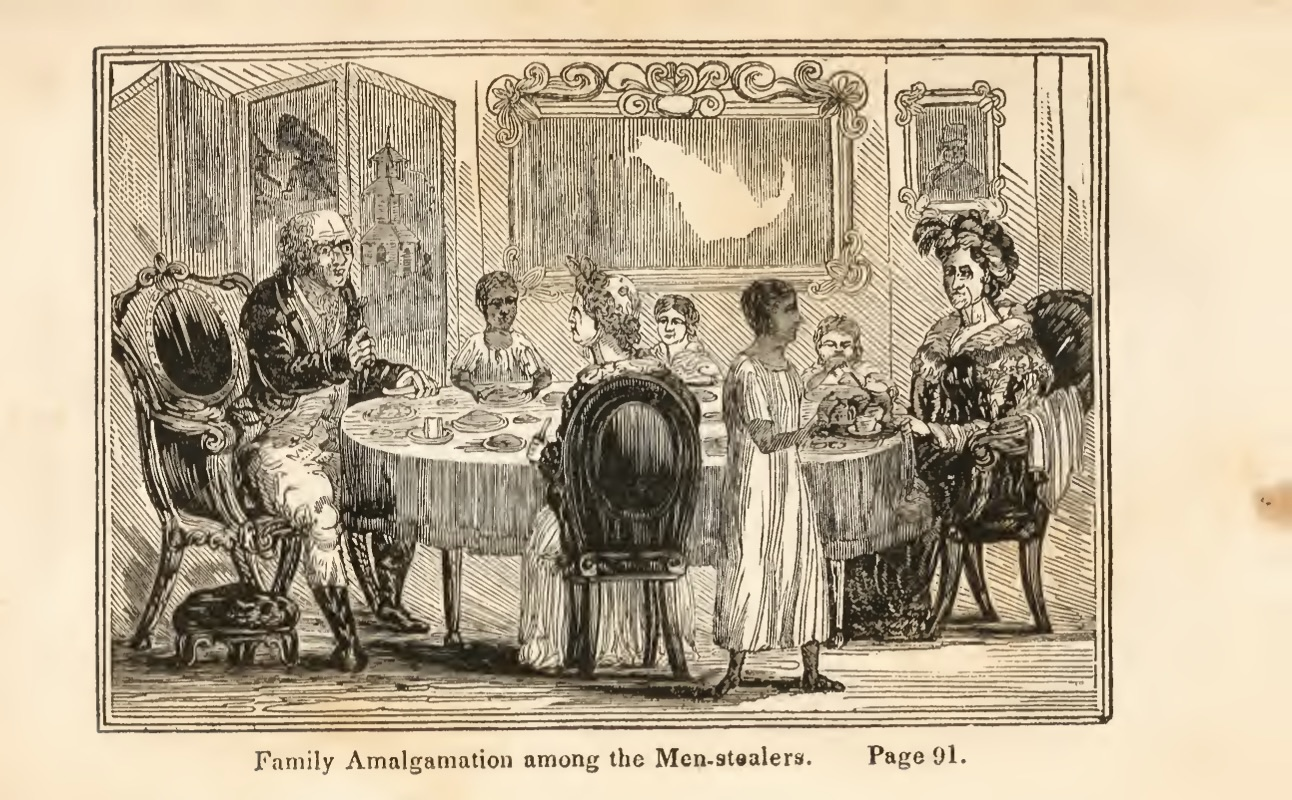
"Family amalgamation among the Men-stealers" (Picture of Slavery in the United States of America by Rev. George Bourne, published by Edwin Hunt in Middletown, Conn., 1834)

A shadow family was an unacknowledged child or children created by a white male slave owner with a female slave. Often they lived in physical proximity to their father, and a "married maverick reared a white family in the front of the house even as he reared a mulatto family in the back."

In 1834, abolitionist George Bourne wrote, "In the houses of slave-holders, you behold young ladies elegantly attired and attended by their coloured sisters, children of the same father, and yet slaves. You recognise the driver of the carriage, the footman, and other domestics as manifestly the planter's own offspring...Two ladies of the first rank in Virginia affirmed that the Northern citizens were totally incompetent to form any correct idea of a slave plantation. One of them remarked: 'We are called wives, and as such are recognised in law; but we are little more than superintendents of a coloured seraglio.' When the old slave-driver is dead, the 'boy' who is most like him is generally called by his title; and you are often surprised to hear a mulatto coachman or footman denominated captain, major, or colonel. You ask the cause, and are informed, 'the man is so like his father, that if it were not for the colour of his skin, he is such a chip off the old block, that you could not know them apart.'"

In the United States, the most notable example is Thomas Jefferson's six children with Sally Hemings. However, the concept appears throughout the slave economy and influenced American race relations and social history long after slavery was abolished. For example, it has a strong presence in the novels of William Faulkner: "This extreme fear of miscegenation and existence of 'shadow families' is a wrong that Faulkner aims to resurrect from the past."

The documentary record of these families is meager at best and, as a rule, "Nobody's shadow family from slavery times shows up on ancestry websites—not even Faulkner's." Secrecy was of the utmost, for reasons both social and economic: "Sometimes, members of shadow families were abandoned or mistreated, either by the man or by his legitimate white heirs. A white father and husband rarely left his legitimate heirs for his shadow family...Polite Southern society, meanwhile, would criticize a man who did not keep his shadow family sufficiently secret." Talking about shadow families in the public sphere was taboo; for example, when an 18th-century Tidewater woman took her husband to court for adultery and physical abuse, "Elizabeth Yerby transgressed all polite conventions by publicizing evidence of her husband's shadow family. By confronting George in front of William Brown, by drawing a guest's attention to mulatto children in her household, she humiliated her husband, damaging his community standing. This action was a misstep on her part."

"It is evident, from the tenor of the will of Carter, and of the contract, and the evasive statements in the answer to the petition, that...Harriet is the offspring of...Fanny, by testator...No court certainly would lend its aid to enforce rights predicated upon immorality of the grossest and most dangerous kind—dangerous, because the example of a negress, or mulatto, brought up in the style specified...would necessarily exert a most baleful influence upon the surrounding negro population."

— Barksdale v. Elam, 30 Miss. 694, April 1856, Judicial Cases Concerning Slavery and the American Negro, Volume III (1932)

== Influence ==
Scholar Arlene R. Keizer, writing about a work by the African-American artist Kara Walker, argues that she uses cut-paper silhouette to cast "the entire family, white and black, slave masters, slave mistresses, enslaved 'concubines,' and children (following the condition of the mother), into shadow...a dysfunctional family portrait, referencing both the biological families engendered through slavery and the nation as a whole. Walker's work calls us to acknowledge and to witness the hypersexualized, often incestuous nature of these families and their implications for the American and African American collective imagination, but offers no path toward resolution."

== See also ==
- Children of the plantation
- Hypodescent
- Partus sequitur ventrem
- Anti-miscegenation law
- Slaves in the Family
- Mulatto § Louisiana
- Plaçage
