= Glossary of American slavery =

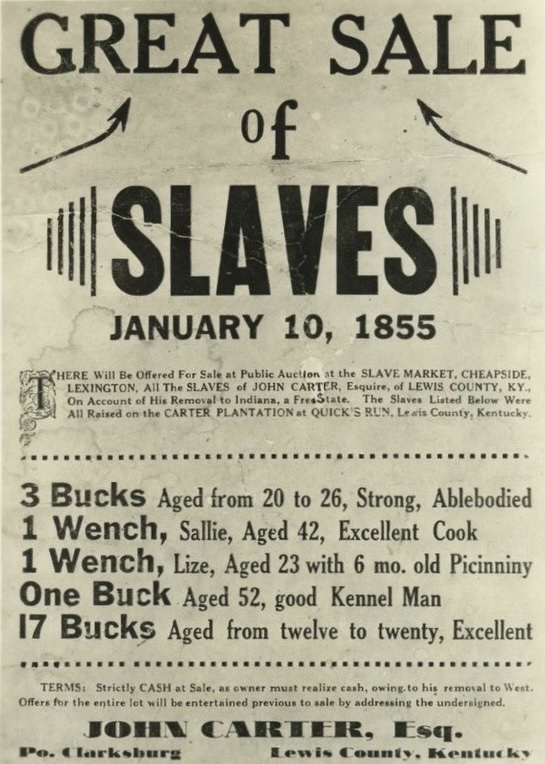
Broadside advertising bucks, wenches and a "picaninny" in Kentucky, 1855

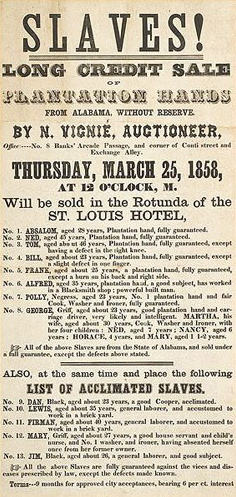
Broadside advertising "acclimated" slaves separately from other people for sale, in New Orleans in 1858

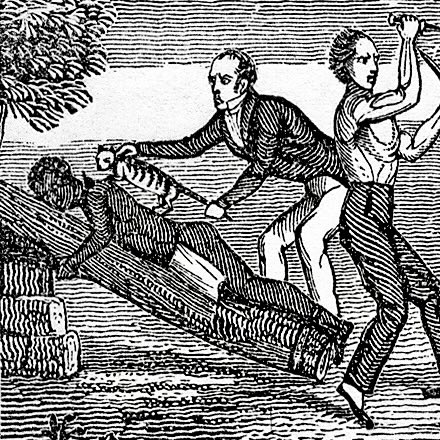
A form of torture called cat-hauling, excerpt from woodcut in 1840 Anti-Slavery Almanac

This is a glossary of American slavery, terminology specific to the cultural, economic, and political history of slavery in the United States.

...this was a society in which slaves were rarely slaves: instead, in the antebellum South, they were "Negroes," "servants," "my people," or were part of ' "my family white and black." Nor were slaveholders "slaveholders": they were "planters" or "farmers."

— Michael Tadman, "The Reputation of the Slave Trader in Southern History and the Social Memory of the South" (2007)

The word "Slave" while employed categorically and as a general term was not used in those days directly or specifically. Instead the words "negroes", "servants", "people", "hands", "force", and "niggers" were used...Men were "boys", addressed as such unless very old and venerated when they were termed "uncle", or "daddy". Women were called "girls", "wenches", "women", "aunties", "mammies", and "grannies".

— They Found It in Natchez (1939)

- Acclimated: Enslaved people with acquired immunity to infectious diseases such as cholera, smallpox, yellow fever, etc.
- Breeding slave: Used for slaves valued for their reproductive qualities, such as high fertility and health, to produce slave offspring; akin to a broodmare (female slaves) or sire (male slaves).
- Broad wife: Also broad husband; spouse of an enslaved person who lived on another plantation or in another settlement.
- Buck: Male enslaved person, usually of reproductive age and often with a sexually suggestive connotation.
- Coastwise: Transportation of enslaved people by ocean-going ship between the Atlantic and Gulf coasts.
- Coffle: Group of enslaved people in a chain gang for overland shipment on foot.
- Complete: The use of the word complete in a slave advertisement indicated a high level of competency, meaning the person had especial capability and/or the necessary training to "adeptly" perform certain work.
- Dower slaves: Slaves brought into a family unit through the wife's previous ownership.
- Enslaved, enslavement, etc.: Used in lieu of slave; shifting from a noun to a transitive verb, describing the act of making "(a person or thing) subject or subordinate to another; to deprive of (esp. religious or political) freedom"; in use continually, but increasingly common in 21st-century reporting and scholarship. Per U.S. National Park Service guides on the language at slavery-topical historic sites, "To be a slave implies that is your identity. It describes an individual on someone else's terms. An individual must not be defined by a condition thrust upon them. It is not who they are. It lessens their humanity." Other recommended substitutions include freedom seeker for fugitive or runaway slave, torture for discipline, human trafficking for slave trade, chattel slavery for slavery, forced labor camp for plantation complex, etc. These shifts have been described as "reparative semantics." Opponents of these substitutions argue that it is impossible to study or communicate history accurately within a framework of mandatory or stilted vocabulary. Other criticisms include that a shift like plantation to labor camp "aims to highlight the dangerous, difficult, and highly technical work performed by the enslaved, but also risks eliding crucial historical distinctions between Atlantic slavery and other forms of forced labor under Nazi and Soviet regimes." A scholar writing about the debate in 2024 commented, "Overall, historians should use this issue as an opportunity to reflect on the extent to which scholarship of transatlantic slavery should set the terms of debate for slavery studies in general."
- Estate slaves: An inheritance of enslaved people bequeathed from one white person to another.
- Fancy girl: Enslaved women sold for sexual exploitation, usually young, usually with light skin color, usually at price points significantly above that for field hands or even skilled mechanics.
- Field holler: African American work songs with roots in the plantation era.
- Gang system: Form of enslaved-labor management, contrast task system.
- Griffe: Also, griffonne, a color/race descriptor most commonly used in Louisiana, usually describing someone who was one-quarter white and three-quarters black; for other examples of the detailed race-mixture vocabulary developed in Louisiana, see Mulatto § Louisiana.
- Hands: Slaves by another, more euphemistic name. See also: Quarter hands, half hands, three-quarter hands, and full hands
- Hand-sawing: Not sawing off a human hand, but a form of torture wherein an enslaved person was beaten with the toothed edge of a hand saw.
- Ironing negroes: Use of blacksmiths to attach chains, collars, shackles, etc. to the enslaved, particularly before transport; "ironing" could also be used for prisoners of any race or condition of servitude.
- Likely: Used adjectivally; according to historian Calvin Schermerhorn, "Likely was code for able, and in the case of women, fertile." Likely implied that a slave listed for sale was healthy, versatile, and strong.
- No. 1 men: Slave traders' classification for healthy enslaved males aged 19 to 25. An enslaved person expected to draw high bids might be tagged extra; less-marketable human beings for sale at auction were described as "fair, No. 2, 3rd rate, scrubs, and boys too small to plough." Overall, buyers competed most for male field hands aged 18 to 30, so "the selling price of this class supplied something of a basis for the sale of all Negroes". One index of slave prices at the Richmond market in 1849 had several price gradations for female slaves but only two subdivisions for male slaves: No. 1 men and "plow boys 5 ft 2 inches."
- Pan toting: Food co-opted from slavers by the enslaved.
- Pickaninny: An enslaved child.
- Plow boys or plough boys: Descriptive term appearing in ads, sometimes seemingly describing a male child. One slave-sale ad published in Tennessee in 1827 listed two enslaved boys, aged 13 and 10, as "plough boys." Another lists "three men...four Girls, and a plow boy." A North Carolina man explained in 1851 that he "planted 12 acres to the common hand...counting men, women and large plow boys as hands." Other ads list grown men as "cart and plow boys."
- Prime age: Enslaved individuals between the ages of 15 and 25, considered the peak years for purchasing long-term productivity and fertility.
- Quarter hands, half hands, three-quarter hands, and full hands: Grading system for agricultural laborers based on age and capacity for work, re-evaluated annually as child workers aged and grew, or as older workers became less productive and slower. Work assignments for quarter-hands were a quarter of the amount of work, weight, or distance expected from a full hand, etc.
- Raised by: Slave owners described a slave as "raised by me" when he or she had lived in the enslaver's household since birth. The use of "raised by" neither indicated nor precluded a genetic relationship between enslaver and enslaved.
- Redhibition: Essentially a state-mandated warranty on enslaved people found to be "defective" or in some way misrepresented by slave dealers; specific to Louisiana.
- Salting: Form of torture where brine was applied to the wounds of a whipped slave. Other substances were used, including turpentine, hot-pepper juice, and dripping candle wax, et al.
- Saltwater slave: An enslaved person who was born in Africa rather than in the Americas.
- Scramble: A "first come, first served" supermarket-sweep-style sale of enslaved people.
- Seasoning: Period of adjustment for newly trafficked Africans brought to the Americas.
- Slave for life: Legal term used to distinguish between chattel slaves and indentured servants or apprentices, who were held in bondage for a limited term under certain conditions.
- Stampede: Per the Slave Stampedes on the Missouri Borderlands project of Dickinson College and the U.S. National Park Service, the term stampede came into use in the 1840s to describe "serial escapes by individuals or pairs, sometimes to describe either spontaneous or planned small group escapes of 3 or more people, and yet most often to define a special type of mass escape involving a dozen or more, often armed, bands of enslaved people heading defiantly toward freedom."
- Stripes: Strikes with a whip, which would leave bloody gashes in the skin that initially looked like stripes, at least until the multiple strikes merged into one open wound of macerated flesh; commonly meted in out in increments of "39 stripes" because 40 or more lashes was proscribed by Deuteronomy 25:3, translated in the New International Version as, "but the judge must not impose more than forty lashes. If the guilty party is flogged more than that, your fellow Israelite will be degraded in your eyes."
- Task system: Form of enslaved-labor management, contrast gang system.
- Tavern traders: Slave traders who used locals taverns as a place of business, and/or owners of taverns, hotels, or inns who did part-time slave trading as a side business have been called tavern traders. Some of these taverns and hotels had their own slave pens, in part so guests could incarcerate their body servants and coachmen overnight while traveling. Tavern trading was especially common in the first quarter of the 19th century.
- Term slave: One of roughly 1,000 children registered in the state of Pennsylvania between 1788 and 1826 who were "purportedly free" but owed 28 years of labor to owners of their legally enslaved mothers; the U.S. government did not recognize this legal status.
- Wench: Female enslaved person, usually of reproductive age and often with a sexually suggestive connotation.

== See also ==
- Mulatto § Louisiana for blood-quantum terminology
- Negro and Nigger
- Partus sequitur ventrem
- Category:American legal terminology
