= Calvin Schermerhorn =

American historian (born 1975)

Calvin Schermerhorn (born 1975) is an American historian who specializes in the study of slavery, capitalism, and African-American inequality. Educated at Saint Mary's College of Maryland, Harvard Divinity School and University of Virginia, he teaches at Arizona State University.

== Research ==
In 2012, he annotated a newly recovered slave narrative by a man named Henry Goings, who Schermerhorn called "a brilliant observer of places, events and human nature. He also was a gifted writer." His 2015 The Business of Slavery was about "how specific decisions and adaptations of individual slavers to changing conditions helped create an American empire of slavery," and "belies the alleged moral divide between the North and the South by reconstructing interregional and global networks of finance, charting the voluntary and coerced movement of people from northern to southern states, and highlighting the southern business ventures of northern capitalists." A review by Peter Kolchin commented, "In arguing that slavery was capitalist, Schermerhorn neatly evades the quandary that tormented Fogel and Engerman of how such an evil system as slavery could be so efficient, and he does so by seeing capitalism itself as being, by nature, rapacious and exploitative." In 2019, following a spike in interest in the slave traders Franklin & Armfield, Schermerhorn observed that they were men who bragged "about raping enslaved people" but for decades if not centuries, standard American histories "let them off scot-free."

Schermerhorn's Unrequited Toil was described as "highly readable" and "a masterful fusion of the latest scholarship."

Schermerhorn was awarded a Fulbright in 2021 to continue his study of "Slavery, Capitalism, and Inequality in the Anglophone Atlantic World" in the United Kingdom.

== Selected works ==
- Schermerhorn, Calvin (2009). "Left Behind but Getting Ahead: Antebellum Slavery's Orphans in the Chesapeake, 1820–60". In Campbell, Gwyn; Miers, Suzanne; Miller, Joseph Calder (eds.). Children in slavery through the ages. Athens: Ohio University Press. ISBN 978-0-8214-1876-5. OCLC 286478978.
- Schermerhorn, Calvin (2009). "The Everyday Life of Enslaved People in the Antebellum South". OAH Magazine of History. 23 (2): 31–36. doi:10.1093/maghis/23.2.31. ISSN 0882-228X. JSTOR 40505985.
- Schermerhorn, Calvin (2011). Money over Mastery, Family over Freedom: Slavery in the Antebellum Upper South. Studies in early American economy and society from the Library Company of Philadelphia. Baltimore: Johns Hopkins University Press. ISBN 978-1-4214-0035-8. OCLC 682145417.
- Goings, Henry (2012). Schermerhorn, Calvin; Plunkett, Michael; Gaynor, Edward (eds.). Rambles of a runaway from southern slavery. Carter G. Woodson Institute Series. Charlottesville: University of Virginia Press. ISBN 978-0-8139-3238-5. OCLC 752286963.
- Schermerhorn, Calvin (2014). "Capitalism's Captives: The Maritime United States Slave Trade, 1807–1850". Journal of Social History. 47 (4): 897–921. doi:10.1093/jsh/shu029. JSTOR 43308821.
- Schermerhorn, Calvin (2015). "'The time is now just arriving when many capitalists will make fortunes': Indian removal, finance, and slavery in the making of the American cotton south". In Martin, Bonnie; Brooks, James (eds.). Linking the Histories of Slavery: North America and its Borderlands. School for advanced research advanced seminar series. Santa Fe (N. M.): School for Advanced Research Press. ISBN 978-1-938645-60-0.
- Schermerhorn, Calvin (October 2, 2015). "Slave Trading in a Republic of Credit: Financial Architecture of the US Slave Market, 1815–1840". Slavery & Abolition. 36 (4): 586–602. doi:10.1080/0144039X.2015.1049004. ISSN 0144-039X. S2CID 146765520.
- Schermerhorn, Calvin (2015). "Commodity chains and chained commodities: the U.S. coastwise slave trade and an Atlantic business network". In Forret, Jeff; Sears, Christine E. (eds.). New directions in slavery studies: commodification, community, and comparison. Baton Rouge: Louisiana State University Press. ISBN 978-0-8071-6115-9.
- Schermerhorn, Calvin (2015). The Business of Slavery and the Rise of American Capitalism, 1815–1860. New Haven, Conn.: Yale University Press. doi:10.12987/9780300213898. ISBN 978-0-300-19200-1. JSTOR j.ctt1bh4d2w. LCCN 2014036403. OCLC 890614581.
- Schermerhorn, Calvin (2016). "Chapter 10. The Coastwise Slave Trade and a Mercantile Community of Interest". In Rockman, Seth Edward; Beckert, Sven (eds.). Slavery's Capitalism: A New History of American Economic Development. Early American Studies. Philadelphia: University of Pennsylvania Press. pp. 209–224. doi:10.9783/9780812293098-011. ISBN 978-0-8122-4841-8. JSTOR j.ctt1dfnrs7. LCCN 2016304619. OCLC 945028802.
- Schermerhorn, Calvin (2017). "Monuments, Memory, and Faulkner's Nathan Bedford Forrest". In Watson, Jay; Thomas, James G. (eds.). Faulkner and history. Faulkner and Yoknapatawpha series. Jackson: University Press of Mississippi. ISBN 978-1-4968-0997-1.
- Schermerhorn, Calvin (2020). "Chapter 2: 'Cash for Slaves' The African American Trail of Tears". In Bond, Beverly Greene; O'Donovan, Susan Eva (eds.). Remembering the Memphis Massacre: An American Story. University of Georgia Press. ISBN 9780820356495.
- Schermerhorn, Calvin (2018). Unrequited Toil: A History of United States Slavery. Cambridge Essential Histories. Cambridge: Cambridge University Press. ISBN 978-1-107-02766-4.
- Schermerhorn, Calvin (2025). The Plunder of Black America: How the Racial Wealth Gap Was Made. New Haven: Yale University Press. ISBN 978-0-300-25895-0. LCCN 2024942002. OCLC 1481795017.
