= Benjamin Farar Jr. =

American settler and planter (1773–1825)

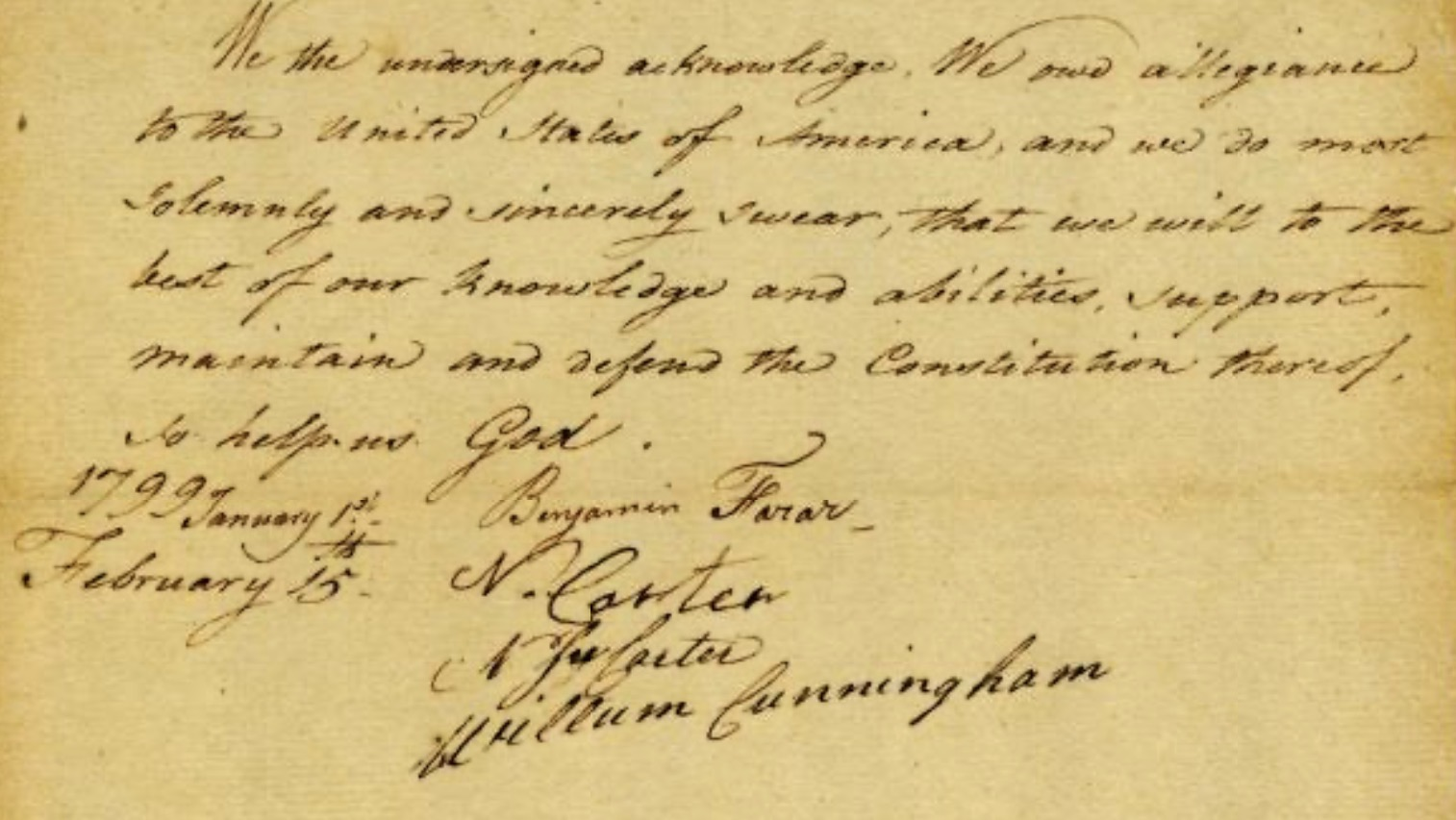
- Benjamin Farar, oath of allegiance to the United States, February 15, 1799
- Born: 1773
- Died: 1825 (aged 51–52)

Benjamin Farar (1773–1825), sometimes spelled Farrar, was a slave-owning planter and territorial militia officer in the lower Mississippi River valley of the United States. He was one of the richest cotton plantation owners in the Natchez District of Mississippi and Concordia Parish, Louisiana. He served as captain of a militia company of mounted dragoons drawn from Adams County, Mississippi Territory who were deployed for the transfer of the Louisiana Purchase from France to the United States in 1803, and for the Sabine Expedition in 1806.

== Biography ==
His father, also Benjamin Farar, was a South Carolinian who came to the lower Mississippi River valley around the time of the American Revolutionary War and had been granted a massive tract of land near Point Coupee along False River by the Spanish colonial government. This Benjamin Farar was known as Captain Benjamin Farar, in part to distinguish him from his father, who was known as Doctor Benjamin Farar.

When the first Mississippi territorial militia was organized by Governor Winthrop Sargent in 1798, Farar was named a captain of horse, along with William Moore and David Ferguson. He made an oath of allegiance to the United States of America on January 1, 1799. The Adams County Dragoons drilled before, during, and after any local wars. Captain Farar was said to be "one of the territory's wealthiest planters and largest slaveholders, an avid land speculator, and a 'violent federalist'."

In 1803 he commanded a troop of volunteer cavalry from Mississippi that was present at the transfer of New Orleans and the Louisiana Territory from France to the United States.

In 1803 he and Adam Tooley were on a courthouse-construction committee together. In 1804 the "seat of justice" for the Adams District was located near his mill, which was in turn located near Second Creek.

In November 1805 Farar was named a juror of the Supreme Court of Mississippi Territory at Washington.

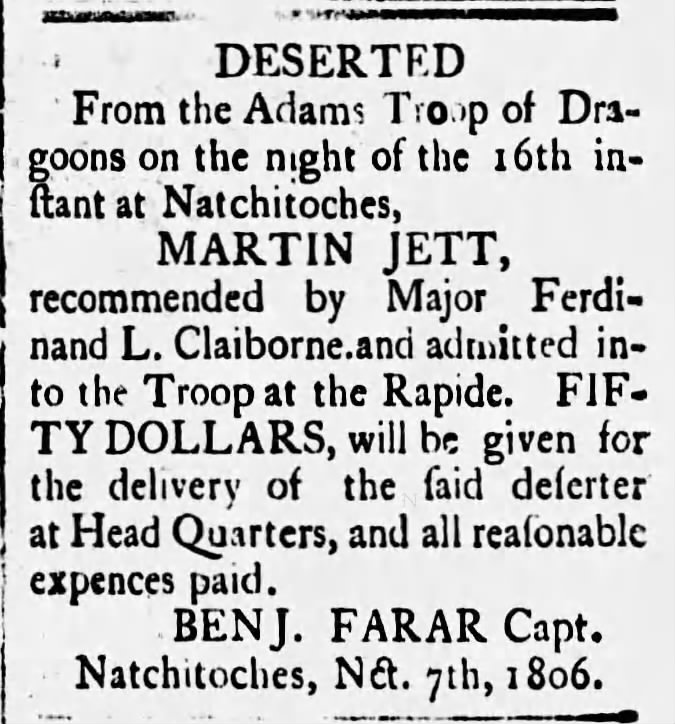
"DESERTED" Mississippi Herald and Natchez Gazette, October 28, 1806

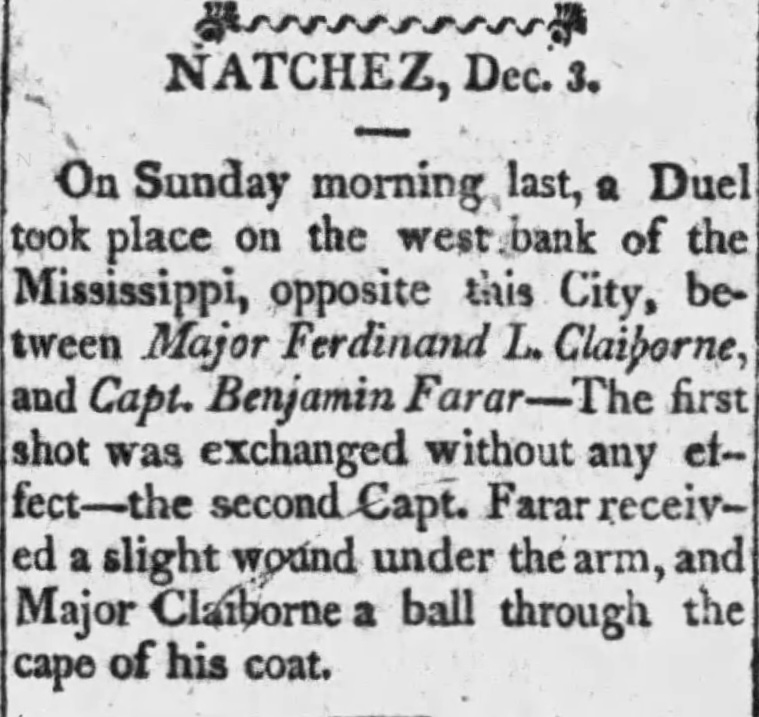
"Natchez, Dec. 3" The Impartial Review and Cumberland Repository, Nashville, Tennessee, December 27, 1806

Farar and Thomas Hinds were captains of the Mississippi dragoons during the 1806 Sabine Expedition against the Spanish. He was captain of what was called the Adams Troop of Horse. His troop of horse was ordered to attend a regimental muster in September 1806. In November 1806 there was finger-pointing by public letter between Farar and Ferdinand L. Claiborne about who was responsible for the conduct of a young deserter named Martin Jett. Farar and Claiborne dueled at the Vidalia sandbar on November 30, 1806. According to a history of dueling in antebellum Louisiana, they shot at each other "with a brace of dueling pistols at ten paces. After two rounds were fired without damage to either party, the challenger declared that his honor was satisfied." The feud continued into 1807, at which time "the Adams Troop of Horse was 'a great favorite with his Excellency' [governor Robert Williams]. Farrar, who informed the governor that his company did not wish to muster with the First Regiment, and Williams agreed to review the Adams Troop of Horse separately. Claiborne was furious. Unfortunately, he had earlier consulted [Andrew] Marschalk, who, as an ex-army officer, was familiar with military protocol. But the fiery editor disagreed with Claiborne's contention that all units of a regiment should be reviewed simultaneously, and he reported the conversation to Williams. According to Marschalk, Claiborne became distraught." He demanded a separate review, Williams refused, Claiborne raged, and Williams then stripped Claiborne of his militia commission.

In 1809 Farar sought Congressional reimbursement for horses used during the Sabine expedition.

There is an 1813 lawsuit in the Louisiana Supreme Court archives between Benjamin Farar and Daniel Clark's executors (Relf & Chew). In 1814 he was one of the top taxpayers in Adams County, Mississippi Territory with "property assessed at $139.20 for 7,650 acres and 140 slaves."

In 1822 he was a vestryman for Trinity Episcopal Church (Natchez). He had a house in Natchez at Wall and State, facing the public square and the courthouse, said to be composed of "large and airy" rooms with a fine yard, coach house, stables, and a good kitchen. After he died it became the home of Dr. William Newton Mercer, and as of 1837 it had been purchased by the owners of the adjoining Parker's Mississippi Hotel. Farar died before August 1825 and Mercer was appointed administrator of his estate.

== Plantation and slave ownership ==
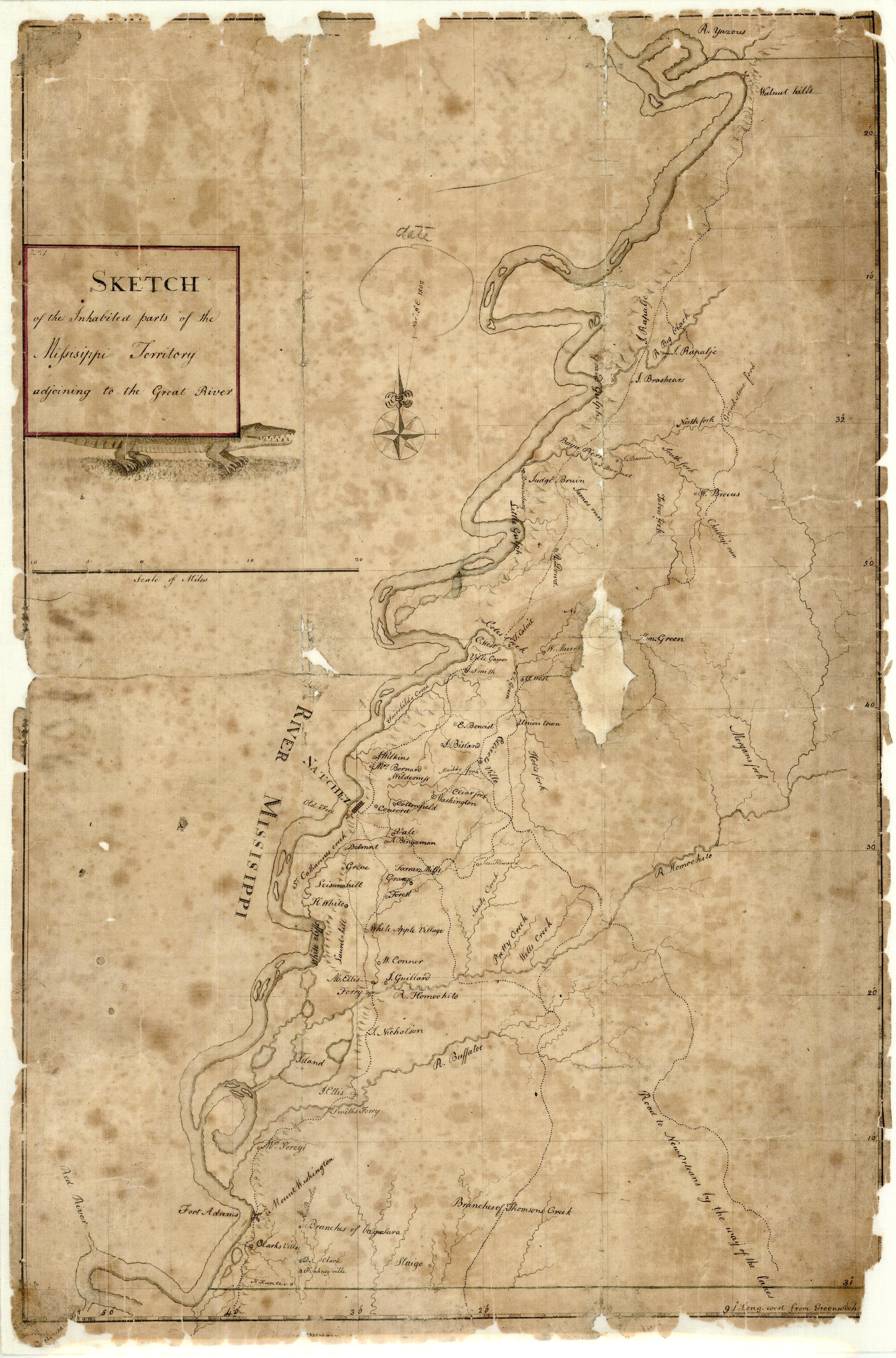
1802 map showing "Farrars Mills" at Second Creek

Benjamin Farar and Mary Ellis Farar claimed a 600-acre parcel in Wilkinson County, on Buffalo Creek, under a Spanish land grant made in 1789. In February 1806, Benjamin Farar offered a $20 reward for the capture of 26-year-old Sam, "5 feet 9 or 10 inches high, large prominent eyes, he has an impediment in his speech, is branded on the breast B. F."

Circa 1800 he was the number-one taxpayer in the vicinity of Second Creek, followed thereafter by Anthony Hutchins and "Mrs. Surget." Amongst his taxable property was 27 slaves. This was the highest number of taxable slaves held in "the richest district" of Adams County. He owned Mississippi riverfront plantations about 20 miles below Vidalia in Concordia Parish. In December 1809 his cotton crop was burned, twice, under what were considered to be suspicious circumstances. The first fire took place in the dead of night: "We are informed, that a fire took place on Thursday last, about three o'clock in the morning on a farm of Capt. BENJAMIN FARAR'S, in the parish of Concordia, Orleans Territory, by which his mill, cotton gin, and the present crop of cotton, together with a considerable portion of the last year's crop, already baled, were entirely consumed. The ructive element was not difcovered until the heat had become so great as not to allow any person to approach within one hundred yards thereof. The damage sustained by Captain Farar in this unfortunate event, is estimated at between twenty five and thirty thousand dollars." The estimated value of the cotton was US$25,000 (equivalent to $514,628 in 2025).

"Another fire, we learn, has taken place on the plantation of Capt. Benjamin Farar, in the Parish of Concordia, Orleans Territory. The Cotton saved from the last conflagration, together with what has been picked out since, amounting in all to something less than 100,000 weight, and a temporary Cotton House, has been consumed. There can no longer exit a doubt as to the manner in which this fire has been communicated. Some unknown and malignant person is the author. Circumstances of a peculiar nature warrant us in making the assertion. It behove every good citizen to be on the watch, and endeavor to detect the infamous incendiary. A man capable of so atrocious a crime will hesitate at nothing."

A later court case record had it that "There was about 600,000 Ibs. of cotton in the seed, in the gin, when it was burned."

In 1818 two enslaved men, Greenock and Abraham, recently purchased from Robert Bell of Nashville, Tennessee, ran away from the plantation of Benjamin Farar of Second Creek. In 1819 he petitioned Mississippi House of Representatives to manumit "Louisa and her daughter Betsey" as had been requested by his brother-in-law Abram Ellis in his will.

== Personal life ==
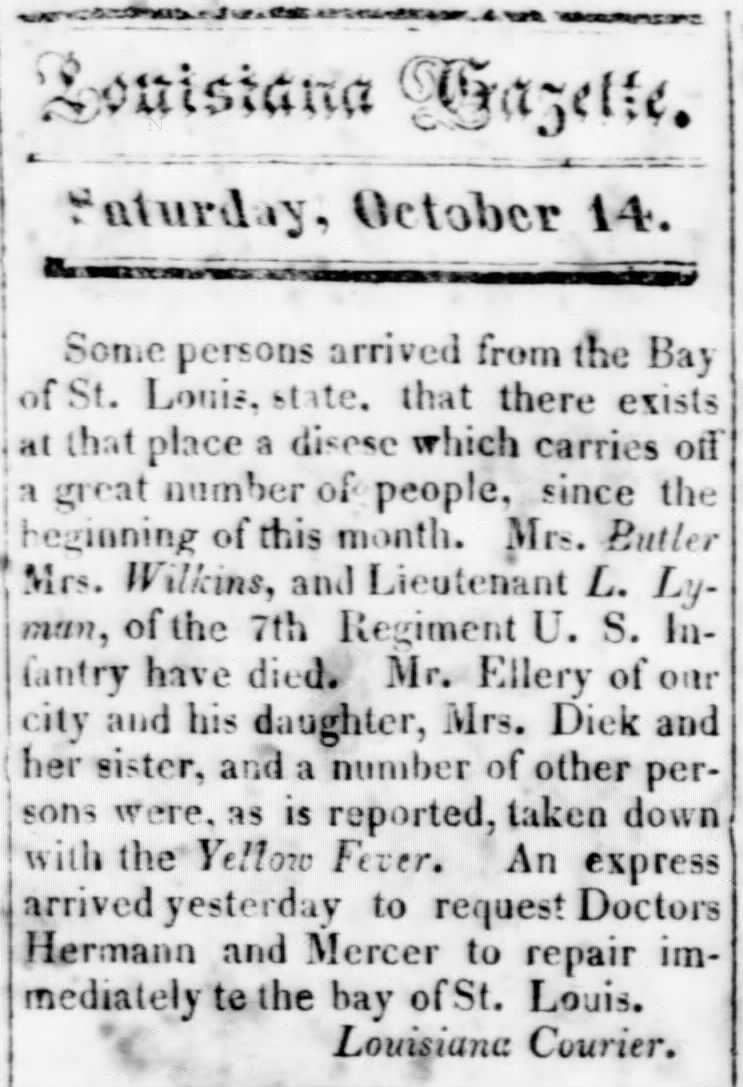
Bay St. Louis yellow fever outbreak, 1820

- On October 14, 1794, the younger Benjamin Farar married Mary Ellis, whose family had lent their name to the Ellis Cliffs along the Mississippi River. Other Ellis women married into the local Rapalje, Minor, Chotard, Gustine, and Duncan planter families, which extended the network of potential creditors upon whom he could draw. Mary Ellis Farar died October 15, 1820, in the yellow fever outbreak at Bay St. Louis that killed many members of the family.
  - Mary Farar (c. 1795–October 16, 1820) m. John Dick
    - Stillborn baby (October 14, 1820)
  - Anna Eliza Farar (August 6, 1796–November 2, 1839) m. Dr. William Newton Mercer
    - Anna Elizabeth Mercer (died 1850s?)
    - "Younger daughter" (d. October 1830, yellow fever)
- Late in life, he remarried, to Jane Beverly of Virginia. According to marriage registers, Benjamin Farar married Ann Tayloe Beverly in 1825 in Wilkinson County, Mississippi. Beverly plantation was said to be named for this wife. Ann Tayloe married second her cousin Carter Randolph in Louisiana. According to one genealogy, Ann Tayloe Beverly was 15 years old at the time of the wedding.
  - Benjamin Carter Beverly Farar was christened at Natchez's Trinity Episcopal Church in 1826. This Benjamin Farar is believed to have died as an infant or child.

According to folklore retold by local writer Edith Wyatt Moore, "What if he did keep a sumptuous menage and dress like a London courtier, wasn't it the custom for the gentry to keep up with London in those days? It is told that he wore gorgeous satin knee breeches with silver buckles, velvet coats in almost as many hues as Joseph's coat and a cocked hat, powdered queue and buckled shoes to say nothing of a jeweled snuff box, lace cuffs, gold braid and silk hose. He maintained a lordly coach drawn by six matching horses and driven by a liveried coachman. There were footmen and postilian riders, also in livery."

== See also ==
- Title and rank in the antebellum U.S. South

== Sources ==
- Agee, Phil (September 2022). Debt-Driven Settlerism: Small Farmers and Bankers in the Trans-Appalachian South, 1800–1820 (M.A. Liberal Studies). City University of New York (CUNY) Graduate Center.
- James, D. Clayton (1993) [1968]. Antebellum Natchez. Baton Rouge, Louisiana: Louisiana State University Press. ISBN 978-0-8071-1860-3. LCCN 68028496. OCLC 28281641.
- Haynes, Robert V. (2010). The Mississippi Territory and the Southwest Frontier, 1795–1817. Lexington: University Press of Kentucky. ISBN 978-0-8131-2577-0. LCCN 2009053115. OCLC 646068242. Project MUSE book 1412.
- Lester, Dick M. (1993). "John Dick of New Orleans". Louisiana History: The Journal of the Louisiana Historical Association. 34 (3): 357–365. ISSN 0024-6816. JSTOR 4233042.
- McBee, May Wilson (1953). The Natchez Court Records, 1767–1805: Abstracts of Early Records. Ann Arbor, Michigan: Edwards Brothers, Inc. – via Internet Archive, digitized from a copy held at the Allen County Public Library Genealogy Center in Fort Wayne, Indiana.
- Peeples, Morgan (Fall 1990). "Brawling and Dueling on the North Louisiana Frontier, 1803–1861: A Sketch". North Louisiana Historical Association Journal. 21 (4): 99–108.
- Rothstein, Morton (1979). "The Changing Social Networks and Investment Behavior of a Slaveholding Elite in the Ante Bellum South: Some Natchez Nabobs, 1800–1860". In Greenfield, Sidney M.; Strickon, Arnold; Aubey, Robert T. (eds.). Entrepreneurs in Cultural Context. School of American Research, Advanced Seminar Series. Albuquerque: University of New Mexico Press. pp. 65–88. ISBN 978-0-8263-0504-6. LCCN 78021433. OCLC 4859059.
- Rowland, Dunbar, ed. (1907). "Territorial Militia". Mississippi; comprising sketches of counties, towns, events, institutions, and persons, arranged in cyclopedic form. Vol. II. Atlanta: Southern Historical Association Publishing. pp. 240–243.
