= Richard Ellis (Mississippi planter) =

Early settler (1732–1792)

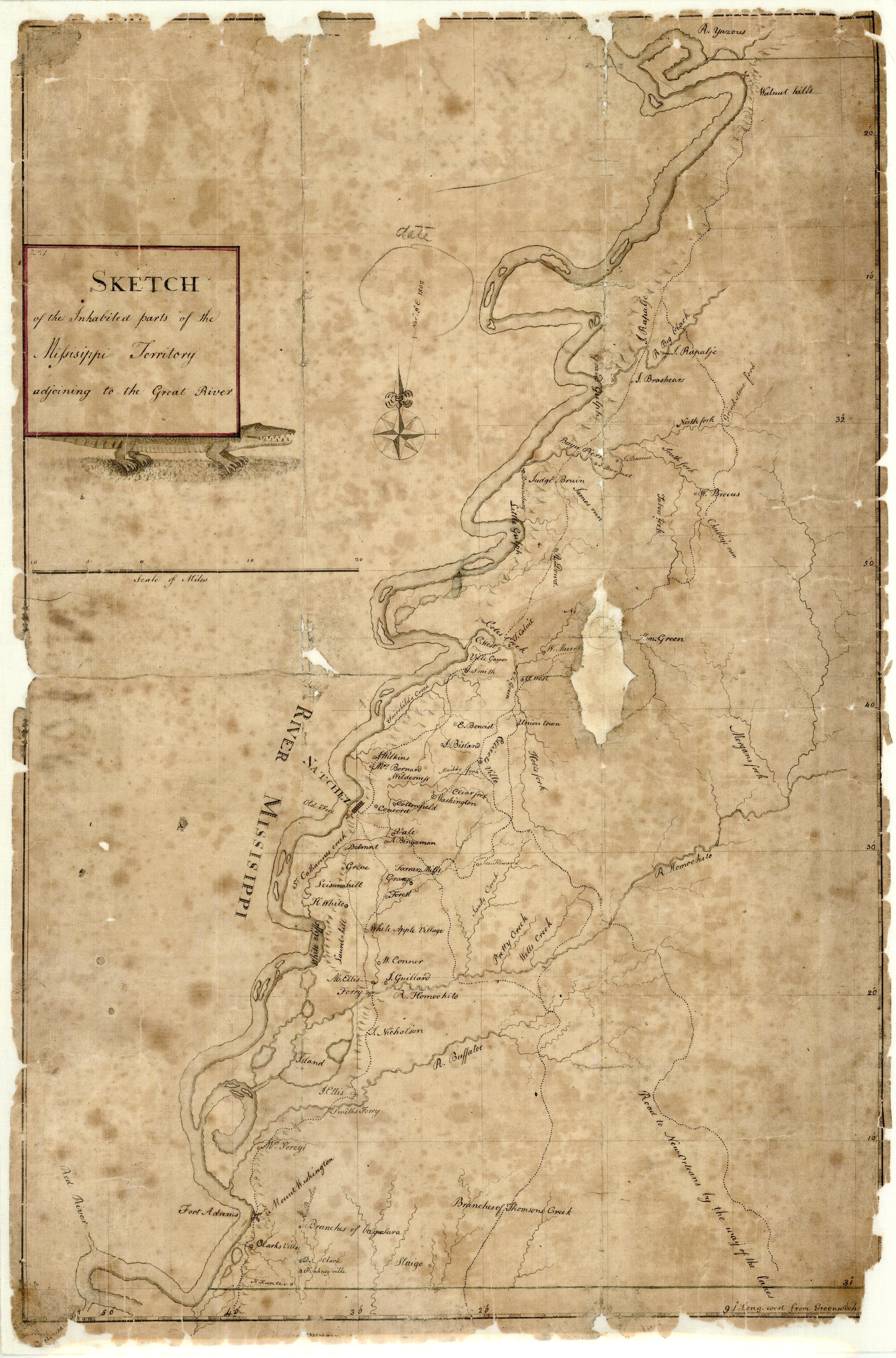
- Born: c. 1732; Province of Virginia
- Died: November 6, 1792; Natchez District, West Florida

Richard Ellis (c. 1732—November 6, 1792) was an early Anglo-American settler of the Mississippi River valley. He was the namesake of Ellis Cliffs, Mississippi.

== Biography ==
One account puts Richard Ellis in Mississippi as early as 1772, after he had first settled in Louisiana. According to Edith Wyatt Moore, he first settled in what is now Pointe Coupee Parish in 1772 on a Spanish land grant. His daughter Jane Ellis was married to George Rapalje "in the province prior to 1772." Rapalje was a British soldier "probably stationed at the fort in Baton Rouge, as Sir William Dunbar mentions him several times in his diary written while living near Baton Rouge between the years 1776 and 1780. This clearly demonstrates that George Rapalje was not an English veteran of the Revolution, but a Provincial trooper stationed in British territory."

According to a U.S. Supreme Court decision of 1850, "In the year 1773 or 1774, Richard Ellis removed from Amelia County, Virginia, to the Mississippi country, then claimed and occupied by Spain as part of Louisiana and West Florida, where he continued to reside till his death in 1792. Richard Ellis was accompanied by two sons: John Ellis...and William Cocke Ellis". Ellis settled near the White Cliffs, so-called because of their resemblance to the White Cliffs of Dover in England. These eventually became known as Ellis' Cliffs. Plantation owner Calvin Smith told Mann Butler in the 1830s that as of 1776, "At Ellis' Cliffs there was a solitary settler—Richard Ellis; and his brother William was the only settler south of the Homochitto. He lived at the point of high land, between Buffalo Creek and the Mississippi."

The Ellis family built a plantation house at a site called Laurel Hill. According to Francois Mignon, the house was about 12 mi (19 km) south of Natchez "atop a high ridge and well back from the Mississippi River. The house faced west."

According to historian Ethan A. Grant:

A subdued but permanent rivalry existed between the Ellis brothers, (Note: This seems to be erroneous; Richard Ellis was likely father to John Ellis.) particularly John, and Anthony Hutchins. John and Richard Ellis began on a large scale and grew from there. John arrived at Natchez in June 1773, and in November 1776 received a grant of 1,000 acres. Richard arrived in July 1773, and acquired 3,550 acres on the basis of his family, which included himself, his wife, seven children, and 71 slaves. Richard received further grants of 1,850 and 1,000 acres on June 16, 1779. The Ellis brothers [sic] controlled approximately 20,000 acres at the time of the Spanish conquest.

In 1778, Richard Ellis, Isaac Johnson, Luke Collins, William Hiern, Joseph Thomson, and Charles Percy, were part of a committee of local planters who met with American adventurer James Willing, who occupied the town in February of that year. They secured a pledge from him that "persons, Slaves, and other property of what kind soever [sic] shall remain safe & unmolested during our neutrality" and sent "a Flag of Truce to the Choctaw Indians to give out a talk with a Belt, to prevent the Indians falling on the Defenceless [sic] Inhabitants". The Willing Expedition failed and town was back under British control by May 1778.

In approximately May 1781, Richard Ellis' brother William Ellis was found murdered on his plantation on the south side of the Homochitto River.

Ellis wrote out a will in October 1792, which was witnessed by "Thomas Burling, John H. White, Sam Davenport, Richard Devall, John Ellis Sr., and John Duesbrey". When Richard Ellis died he owned 5,917 acres (2,395 ha) of land and had a household of 97 people, presumably predominantly slaves. His real property included "800 arpents on Buffalo Creek, b. by lands of Mr. Chabot, Homochitto River and said creek, with small house, four cabins and a barn 16 ft. square; 1050 arpents at White Cliffs, 5 leagues from Natchez, b. by Daniel Clark, Anthony Hutchins and Don Philip Trevino; 1600 arpents b. by Daniel Clark, and vacant lands; 800 arpents at Buffalo Creek, b. by Jesse Carter and Mrs. Farar; 600 arpents at St. Catherine's Creek b. by Abner Green and vacant lands, 900 arpents in Villa Gayoso District, b. by Daniel Perry; 200 arpents in Villa Gayoso, b. by said Richard Ellis". Another account states that more than 150 enslaved people were named in Ellis' will, from which "we perceive that Ellis founded one of our earliest fortunes". A 20th-century account has it that the land grants that Richard Ellis received in Mississippi were "for his participation in the French and Indian War". According to a 20th-century account, Ellis died in 1792 in possession of 6,000 acres of land, as well as "more than 150 slaves, and an impressive amount of other property. It took three years to settle the complicated estate and distribute the wealth among his heirs."

The Ellis family became part of the Natchez nabob class and remained influential in Mississippi until the civil war and beyond. According to D. Clayton James in Antebellum Natchez (1968), "The leadership of the [Adams County] gentry changed little from 1799 to 1860. Throughout the era such clans as the Ellises, Dunbars, Hutchinses, Farrars, Bislands, and Brandons stood pre-eminent in landholdings, slave ownership, and social prestige."

== Personal life ==
Richard Ellis was married in 1754 to Mary Cocke, a sister of future Tennessee governor and Cocke County, Tennessee namesake William Alexander Cocke. Mary Cocke and Richard Ellis were said to have had seven children.

- Jane Ellis (d. 1823) m. George Rapalje (d. c. 1816) Upon Jane Ellis Rapalje's death she left "her fortune of bank stocks, cash, slaves and lands consisting of Beaux Pres plantation, the Clifford plantation and the town house and house servants to nieces and nephews. She thus carried out the letter of her father's will which entailed her property by willing that it revert to Ellis heirs".
- Abram Ellis (d. 1816) m. Margaret Gaillard (a daughter of Tacitus Gaillard) - Abram Ellis was an officer of the Adams County Dragoons (militia cavalry), along with Richard King and brother-in-law Benjamin Farar; "they served in minor capacities under General Jackson at New Orleans [and] continued to drill long after the war." In 1819 he petitioned the Mississippi House of Representatives to manumit "Louisa and her daughter Betsey" as had been requested by his brother-in-law Abram Ellis in his will.
  - Margaret Ellis (d. 1815, yellow fever) m. Stephen Duncan
  - Anna Ellis, possibly called "Nancy" m. Thomas Butler (it was through Anna/Nancy that Laurel Hill plantation eventually descended to the Pierce Butlers)
  - Richard G. Ellis m. Julia Saul
- John Ellis, politician of Mississippi Territory
- William Ellis – Richard Ellis' son William Cocke Ellis "left the Mississippi territory in 1784 or 1785; went to Virginia; never returned from there; and died there in 1790"
- Mary Ellis m. Benjamin Farar Jr.
- Martha Ellis m. Stephen Minor

== Laurel Hill ==
As one writer told it in the 1960s, "Laurel Hill was old when the Civil War was new." The Laurel Hill house was built near where a "previous French dwelling" had stood. Local historian Moore wrote in the 1930s about a "heap of brick and crumbling ruins" alongside Laurel Hill that gave "evidence of a white man's habitation there".

[Richard Ellis] first built a three-room house on a brick foundation. These rooms ran from north to south with the center rooms being 25 feet square and rooms on either side almost as large. Additional wings and rooms were added to the original construction and were planned so well that the result is symmetrical and well proportioned. The house was two stories high in the rear and formed square around courtyard, with galleries all around the house opening on the square. The low roof supported by heavy dove-tailed rafters, was supported by a gallery 82 feet long. Heavy timbers were held together by wooded pegs. One wing was added to the house in 1800 and another several years later.

As described by Francis Mignon, "...the structure was doubled in size by adding to the south end of the original dwelling at right angles, forming a gigantic L. In another few years, a third structure of similar size was added at right angles to the southern wing, forming a squared-off letter U. Finally, when several more decades had passed, a fourth section was constructed, closing the U at its open space and transforming the edifice into a hollow square. Its enclosed courtyard was paved with flag stones; a double staircase on one side led up to a gallery running around the inside of the enclosure. I never saw any plantation home like it in the old South."

Laurel Hill passed to Richard Ellis' daughter Mary Ellis and her husband Benjamin Farar, and then to their daughter Ana Eliza Farar and her husband William Newton Mercer. When Ana Farar Mercer died in 1839, her "cousin and companion" Eliza Young took over as head of the Mercer household, and Young is credited with the house's decor and garden expansion. Eliza Young was the oldest daughter of Ann Francis Farar and Samuel Young; Benjamin Farar Sr. and Elizabeth Galliard were her grandparents, Benjamin Farar Jr. and Mary Ellis were her uncle and aunt. Under Mercer and Young, the house had a secret staircase, a "Swiss chalet" in the garden that served as a billiard room, and a chapel with a rose window was constructed nearby. The site where the Gothic-style St. Mary's Episcopal Chapel was built in 1839 was "a cemetery before 1837 for the Ellis family and surrounding neighbors". The artist William West painted Benjamin Farrar Young of Wilkinson County, Mississippi in 1851. He also painted a mourning portrait of Benjamin Young's sister Elizabeth Henrietta Young with her friend and relative, the late Anna Elizabeth Mercer.

Medievalist, memoirist, and university president Pierce Butler was the owner of the house for much of the early 20th century. The main house at Laurel Hill burned in 1967. Several outbuildings, including a brick kitchen, barns, and storage buildings, and the more remote chapel building, survived the fire.

== Sources ==
- Brazy, Martha Jane (2006). An American Planter: Stephen Duncan of Antebellum Natchez and New York. Southern biography series. Baton Rouge: Louisiana State University Press. ISBN 978-0-8071-3141-1. LCCN 2006004936. OCLC 781615086. Project MUSE book 16565.
- Buckner, Timothy Ryan (August 2005). Constructing Identities on the Frontier of Slavery, Natchez, Mississippi, 1760–1860 (Thesis). University of Texas at Austin.
- Butler, Mann (1839). Historical sketch of the Natchez, or District of Natchez, in the state of Mississippi; from 1763 to 1798. New York: The Family Magazine. pp. 178, 227 – via Internet Archive, Allen County Public Library Genealogy Center.
- Butler, Pierce (1954). Laurel Hill and later: the record of a teacher. New Orleans: Robert L. Crager. LCCN 55020451. OCLC 1055567999.
- David, Elbra Lilli (2018). Commodification, Slavery, Credit and the Law in the Lower Mississippi River Valley, 1780–1830 (Thesis). UC Irvine.
- Din, Gilbert C. (December 1981). "War Clouds on the Mississippi: Spain's 1785 Crisis in West Florida". Florida Historical Quarterly. 60 (1) 6: 51–76 – via ucf.edu.
- Grant, Ethan (1995). "Anthony Hutchins: A Pioneer of the Old Southwest". Florida Historical Quarterly. 74 (4) 4: 405–422.
- James, D. Clayton (1993) [1968]. Antebellum Natchez. Baton Rouge, Louisiana: Louisiana State University Press. ISBN 978-0-8071-1860-3. LCCN 68028496. OCLC 28281641.
- McBee, May Wilson (1953). The Natchez Court Records, 1767–1805: Abstracts of Early Records. Ann Arbor, Michigan: Edwards Brothers, Inc. – via Internet Archive, digitized from a copy held at the Allen County Public Library Genealogy Center in Fort Wayne, Indiana.
- Rothstein, Morton (1979). "The Changing Social Networks and Investment Behavior of a Slaveholding Elite in the Ante Bellum South: Some Natchez Nabobs, 1800–1860". In Greenfield, Sidney M.; Strickon, Arnold; Aubey, Robert T. (eds.). Entrepreneurs in Cultural Context. School of American Research, Advanced Seminar Series. Albuquerque: University of New Mexico Press. pp. 65–88. ISBN 978-0-8263-0504-6. LCCN 78021433. OCLC 4859059.
- Siebert, Wilbur H. (1916). "The Loyalists in West Florida and the Natchez District". The Mississippi Valley Historical Review. 2 (4): 465–483. doi:10.2307/1886907. ISSN 0161-391X.
