= William Newton Mercer =

American plantation owner and banker (1790–1874)

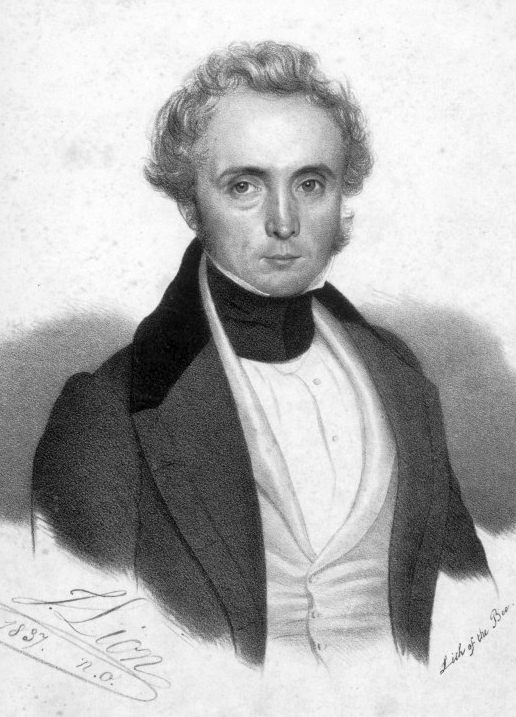
- William Newton Mercer

Personal details
- Born: 1790 Cecil County, Maryland, US
- Died: August 16, 1874 (aged 83–84) New Orleans, Louisiana, US
- Spouse: Ann Eliza Farar (after 1823)
- Relations
- Children: 2
- Education: University of Virginia, University of Pennsylvania School of Medicine
- Occupation: Surgeon, plantation owner

William Newton Mercer (1790 – August 16, 1874) was a surgeon, plantation and slave owner in the lower Mississippi River valley before the American Civil War, banker, and civic leader of 19th-century New Orleans. His New Orleans residence later became the clubhouse of The Boston Club, which has been associated with the history of business and Carnival in New Orleans.

== Early life ==
William was born in 1791 in Cecil County, Maryland. His parents were Anna and Benjamin James Mercer. He studied medicine at the University of Pennsylvania School of Medicine under Benjamin Rush. He then served as a surgeon for United States Army during the War of 1812, stationed in New Orleans, Louisiana, then Natchez, Mississippi, before resigning there into private practice. In 1820 he ministered to a family group afflicted by an outbreak of yellow fever at Bay St. Louis, Mississippi, which ultimately led to his marriage to plantation heiress Anna Farar. He also became close friends with planter Stephen Duncan, who had married Margaret Ellis, a daughter of landowner Abram Ellis and a first cousin of Mercer's wife, whose mother had been an Ellis.

== Career ==
Mercer became one of the Natchez nabobs. He helped found the Mississippi Agricultural Society. He supported John Quincy Adams in the 1824 and in 1828 presidential elections. He began investing in real estate and warehouses in Natchez and New Orleans. Beginning in 1837 he was associated with the Planters Bank. A London banker described both Mercer and Duncan as wealthy men who were lenders rather than borrowers. One of his cotton factors was Washington Jackson, brother of Alabama planter and politician James Jackson.

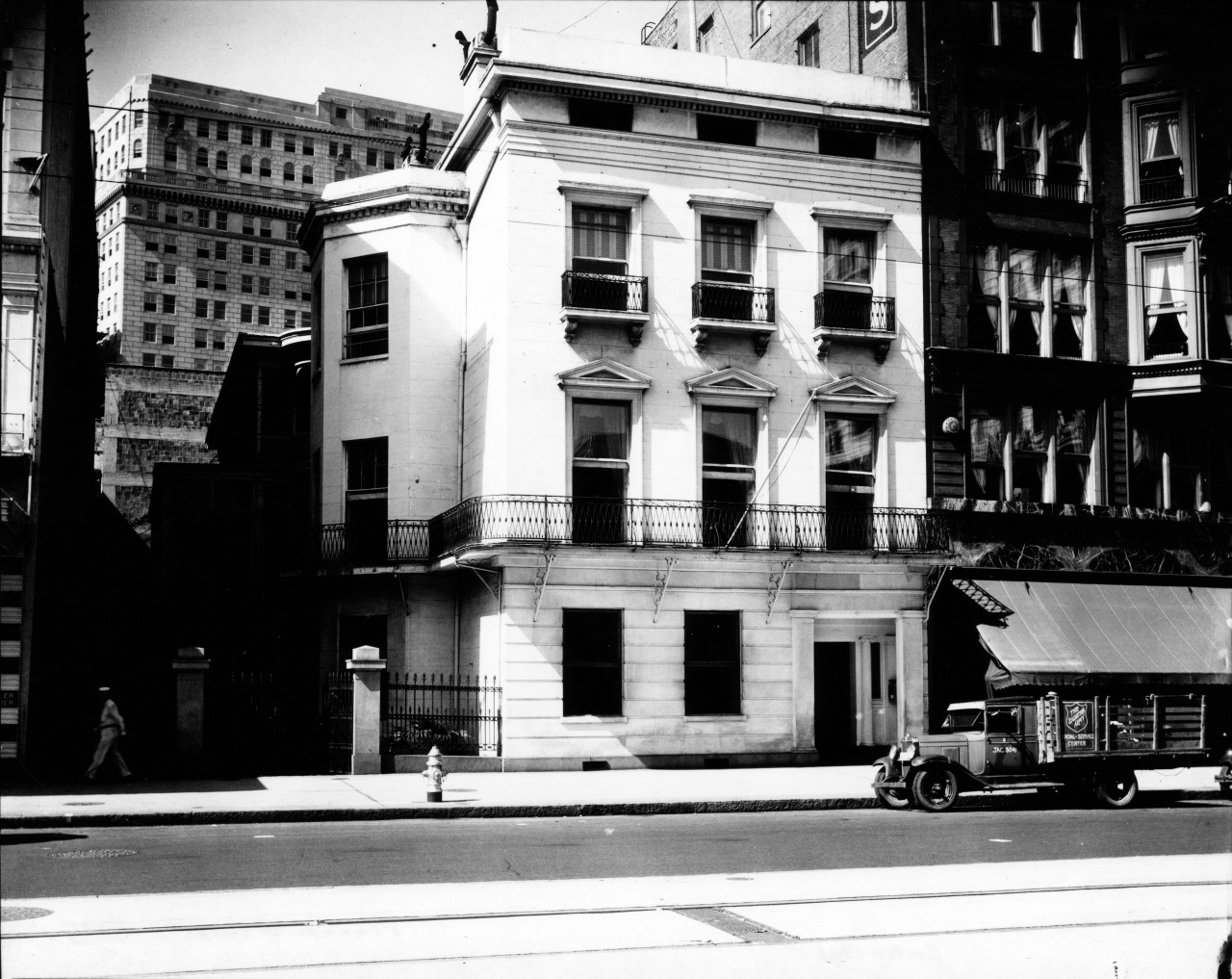
Dr. William Newton Mercer House, now The Boston Club

In Mississippi, Mercer owned four plantations in Adams County—Laurel Hill, Buckhurst, Ellis Cliffs, and Ormond—and property in Coahoma County. Mercer owned 342 slaves, and was the 12th-largest slave owner in the state. Mercer also owned property in Illinois (roughly half of Macoupin County) and Louisiana. He utilized Charles P. Leverich as a factor.

He served as president of the Bank of Louisiana, and trustee at Natchez Academy. He was a member of Christ Church Cathedral and president of St. Anna's Asylum in New Orleans.

Politically, Mercer was a Whig until the collapse of the party in the 1850s. Henry Clay stayed at Mercer's house when he visited New Orleans in 1851. Following the American Civil War, he resided in New Orleans and was a "major aide to Henry C. Warmoth—the 'carpetbag' governor" during the Reconstruction era. When he died in New Orleans at age 83, his estate was valued at US$1,500,000 (equivalent to $42,683,824 in 2025).

=== Philanthropy ===
Mercer was the president of the board of University of Louisiana with Albert G. Blanchard, Chief Justice of the Louisiana Supreme Court Edwin T. Merrick, mayor of New Orleans Charles M. Waterman, Pierre Emile Bonford, Edmund Jean Forstall, and Isadore Labatut.

== Associations ==
Mercer was a member of the Union Club of New York starting in 1852. Along with Duncan and planter Levin Marshall, Mercer stood apart from planters like the Kers, the Nutts, the Liddells, and the McGehees in that they socialized far beyond New Orleans, and thus "attained the wealth, connections to the outside, and acquisitive instincts to give their entrepreneurial drive full scope".

A Louisianan recalled in 1967 that as of the 1940s there were stacks of letters between Mercer and Henry Clay, Daniel Webster, and James K. Polk in the library at Laurel Hill mansion at White Cliffs.

== Personal life ==
In 1823, Mercer married in Natchez, Ann Eliza Farar. Farar was the daughter of Benjamin Farar and Mary Ellis, heiress of Richard Ellis, the original recipient of the Spanish land grant of 20,000 ha (49,000 acres), including Ellis Cliffs, Mississippi, and Laurel Hill Plantation in Adams County, Mississippi. The family resided at their Laurel Hill Plantation in Adams County, where Mercer built St. Mary's Episcopal Chapel. Ann Eliza Farar Mercer suffered from a "protracted illness" in the 1830s and the family traveled to Europe in search of treatment options. His wife died of consumption in November 1839. Their daughter died not long after. Mercer, his wife, and his daughter are all buried together in Natchez.

St. Mary's is a Gothic-style chapel constructed in about 1839. It fell out of regular use by 1850. Church services had been segregated by race.

== Sources ==
- Rothstein, Morton (1979). "The Changing Social Networks and Investment Behavior of a Slaveholding Elite in the Ante Bellum South: Some Natchez Nabobs, 1800–1860". In Greenfield, Sidney M.; Strickon, Arnold; Aubey, Robert T. (eds.). Entrepreneurs in Cultural Context. School of American Research, Advanced Seminar Series. Albuquerque: University of New Mexico Press. pp. 65–88. ISBN 978-0-8263-0504-6. LCCN 78021433. OCLC 4859059.
