= Fort Adams, Mississippi =

Historic village

Coordinates: 31°05′12″N 91°32′53″W

- 1996 USGS Fort Adams quandrangle showing location near the confluence of the Buffalo River and Mississippi River
- Interactive map of Fort Adams, Mississippi

Fort Adams is a small, river port community in Wilkinson County, Mississippi, United States, about 40 miles (64 km) south of Natchez. Fort Adams is located off Highway 24, about 18 mi (29 km) of Woodville.

It is notable for having been the U.S. port of entry on the Mississippi River, before the acquisition of New Orleans; it was the site of an early fort by that name. The town was called Wilkinburg and was incorporated in 1798. Prior to that time, the community was known as Loftus Heights and formerly had been a Jesuit mission called the Rock of Davion, first settled as such around 1699. This is also the site where the Choctaw Treaty of Fort Adams was signed in 1801.

== History ==
The Mound Builders erected the Smith Creek mound and Lessley mound nearby between 750 and 1350 AD.

In 1699, a French priest named Father Albert Davion established a mission on the Mississippi River bluffs at or near the site of Fort Adams. Davion was a Catholic missionary previously stationed in Quebec who "came to bring the religion of Christ to the Tunica Indians. He erected & cross on Block House Hill, the highest peak of Loftus Heights, where he said mass every morning." The hill became a landmark and stopping place for people traveling on the river or on the overland trails that connected Natchez with New Orleans. Davion left the mission by 1722, but the site continued to be called Roche Davion (Davion's Rock) for many years thereafter. It acquired the name Loftus Heights in 1764, when a British expeditionary force led by Major Arthur Loftus was ended after being attacked by Indians at this site.

The site became Fort Adams after the United States and Spain settled a boundary dispute over parts of what is now southern Mississippi. The Treaty of San Lorenzo (Pinckney's Treaty), signed in 1795, established latitude 31 N as the boundary between Spanish West Florida and Mississippi Territory. U.S. General James Wilkinson selected Loftus Heights for a military post in 1798 on the advice of Captain Isaac Guion. The site, on a bluff overlooking the Mississippi River about six miles upriver from the new international boundary, was judged to be a good position for observing and thwarting military movements on the river and was described by Wilkinson as the "most southerly tenable position within our limits." It was also close to the plantation of Wilkinson's business associate Daniel Clark Jr. and the planned town of Clarksville. The new fort was named for the sitting U.S. President, John Adams. It was made of "brick and covered over in earth." The site was host to a customs house and served as an anchorage for "several armed vessels."

In December 1801, Fort Adams was the site of the negotiation and signing of a treaty between the Choctaw and the United States government. The Treaty of Fort Adams was the first in a series of treaties that ceded Choctaw land to the U.S. government and eventually led to the expulsion of the Choctaw Nation from lands east of the Mississippi River. In exchange for 2,641,920 acres (10,691.5 km^{2}) of land, the Choctaws received merchandise worth about $2,000 plus three sets of tools for blacksmithery. In 1803 General James Wilkinson had Colonel Thomas Butler arrested at Fort Adams on charges of being out of U.S. Army dress regulation because he maintained the old style queue (ponytail); Butler's court martial was held in Fredericktown, Maryland.

When Louisiana banned slave traders from out of state in 1832, Austin Woolfolk set up operations at Fort Adams, which was the first steamboat landing beyond the state line.

In the first half of the 19th century, before it was bypassed by both the river and the railroad, "this little place was of some commercial importance. It was quite a nourishing town and thousands of bales of cotton were loaded here, and an extensive business was carried on here; but its glory is now departed, and by reason of its inaccessibility is seldom visited by strangers, and it is but little known beyond the county in which it is situated...a quiet little village with houses of ancient architecture, whose crumbling walls and moss-covered roofs tell us that they were erected in generations that are passed and gone..."

St. Paul's Catholic Church was opened at the settlement around 1900. As of 1993, Fort Adams was a small community and the site of businesses that provided supplies to hunting and fishing camps in the region.

It supported a store until the 1990s but as of 2020 most the buildings were abandoned including a chapel building that had once been St. Paul's Catholic Church but has not been maintained by the local Catholic diocese for many years. Photographs show flood damage up to the windowsills of the church. Fort Adams Baptist Church endures on higher ground. There is only one visible marker in the town cemetery.

== In literature ==
Fort Adams is the place where the protagonist of Edward Everett Hale's famous novel The Man Without a Country, near death, asks a U.S. military officer to see that a gravestone be placed in memory of him, since he's bound to be buried at sea.

== Additional images ==
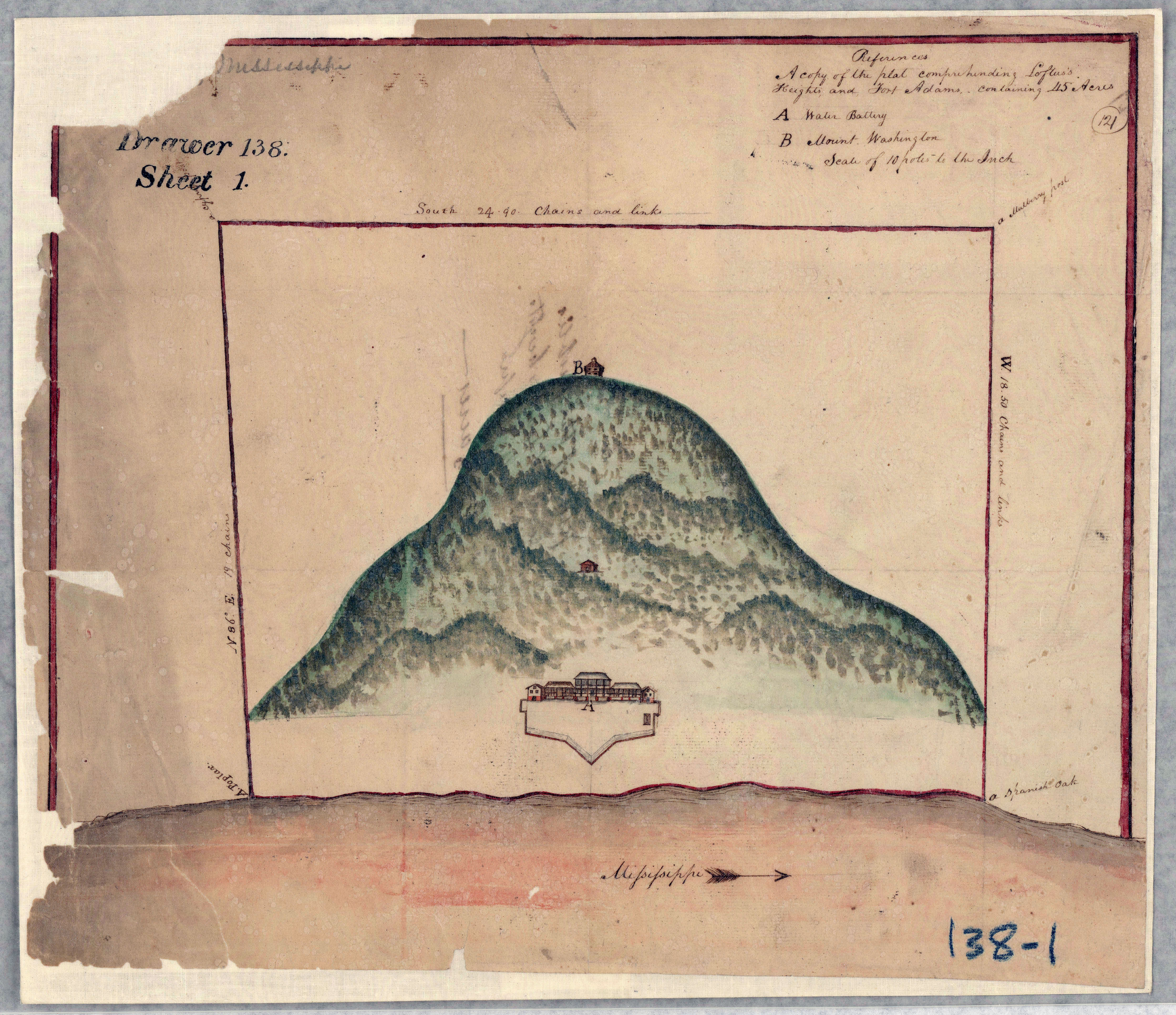
"Copy of the plat comprehending Loftus's Heights, and, Fort Adams, containing 45 acres"

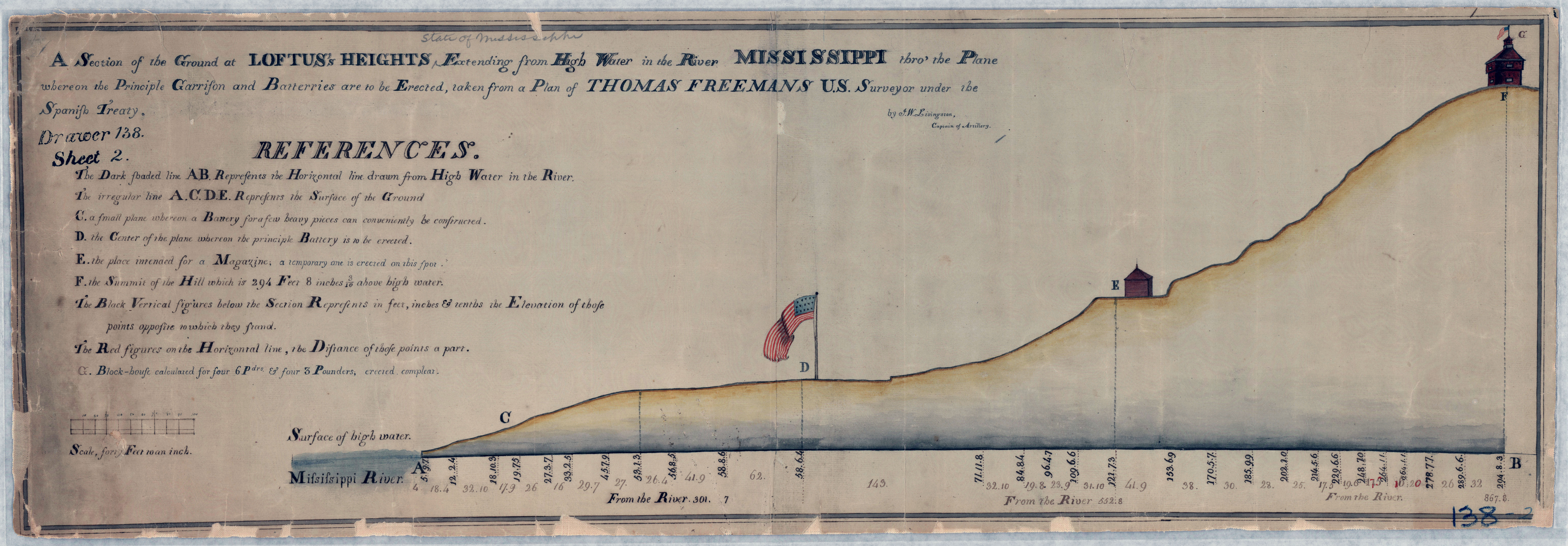
Section of the Ground at Loftus's Heights Extending from High Water in the River Mississppi through the Planes Whereon the Principal Garrison & Batteries are to be Erected

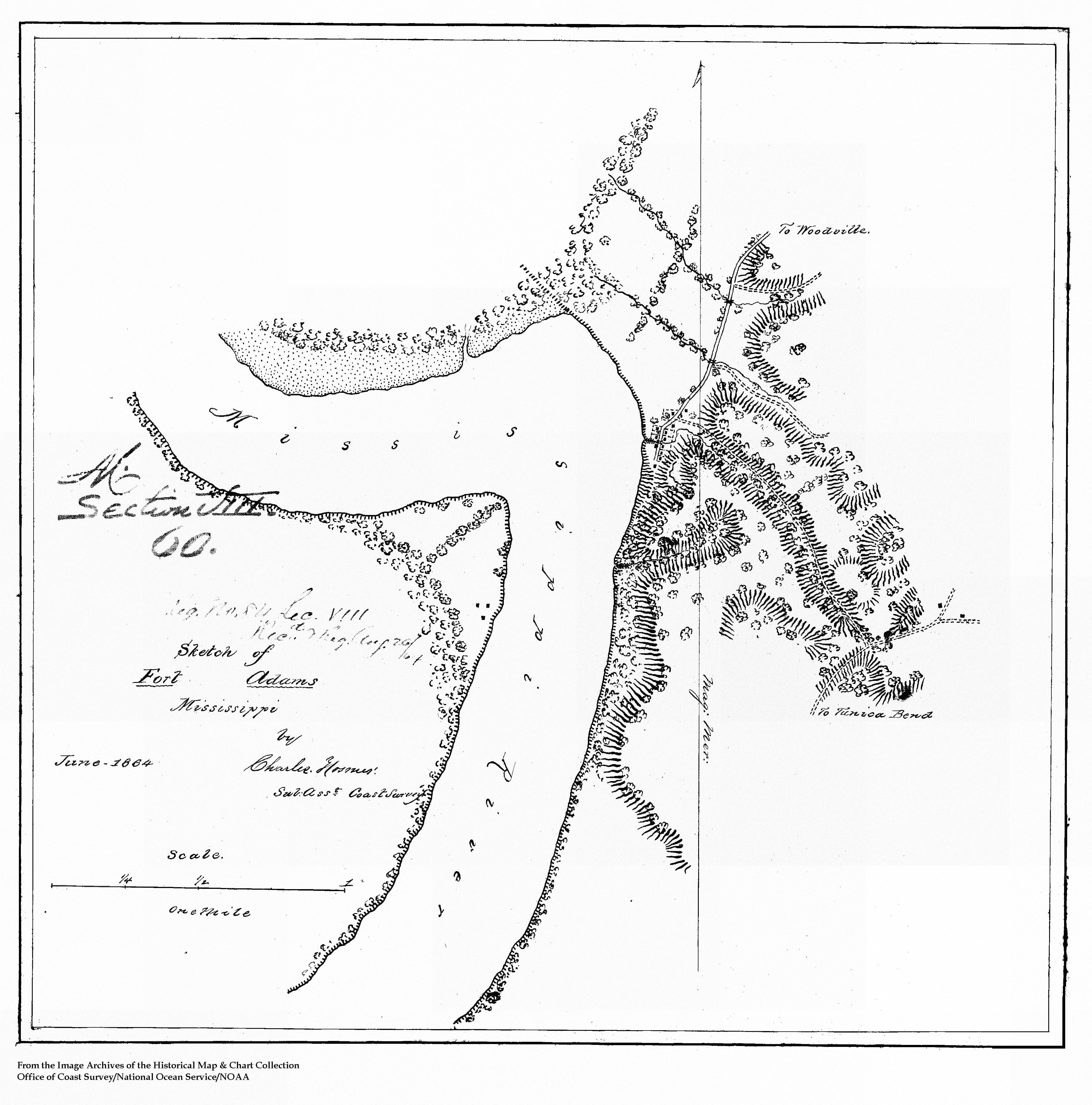
American Civil War: June 1864 sketch map of Fort Adams, Mississippi

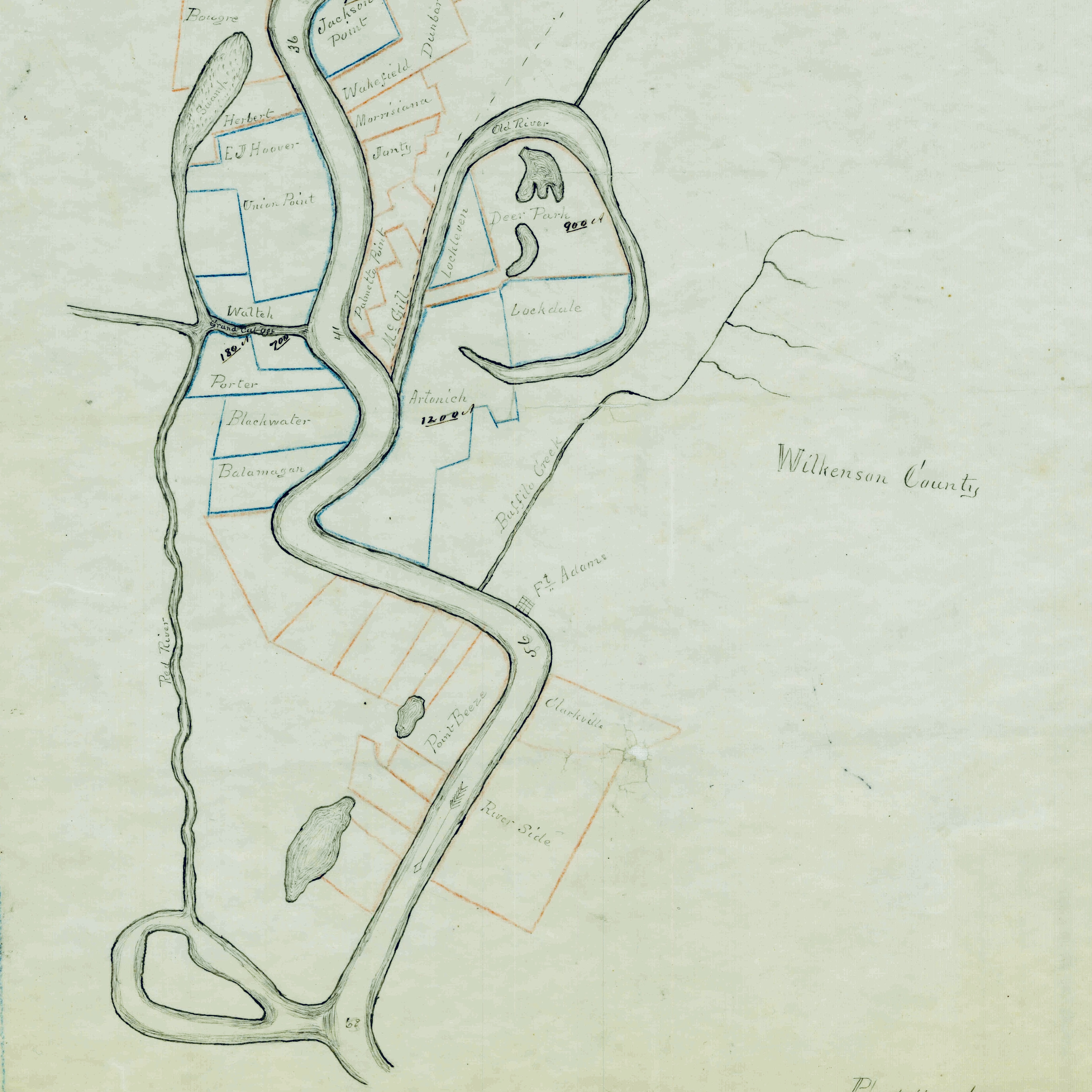
Fort Adams, Mississippi, late 1860s

== See also ==
- U.S. annexation of the Republic of West Florida

== Sources ==
- Baldwin, Leland D. (1980) [1941]. The Keelboat Age on Western Waters. Western Pennsylvania Historical Survey (Reprint ed.). University of Pittsburgh Press. ISBN 978-0-8229-5319-7. LCCN 41010342.
