= Daniel Clark Sr. =

Irish-American merchant (1732–1800)

Daniel Clark
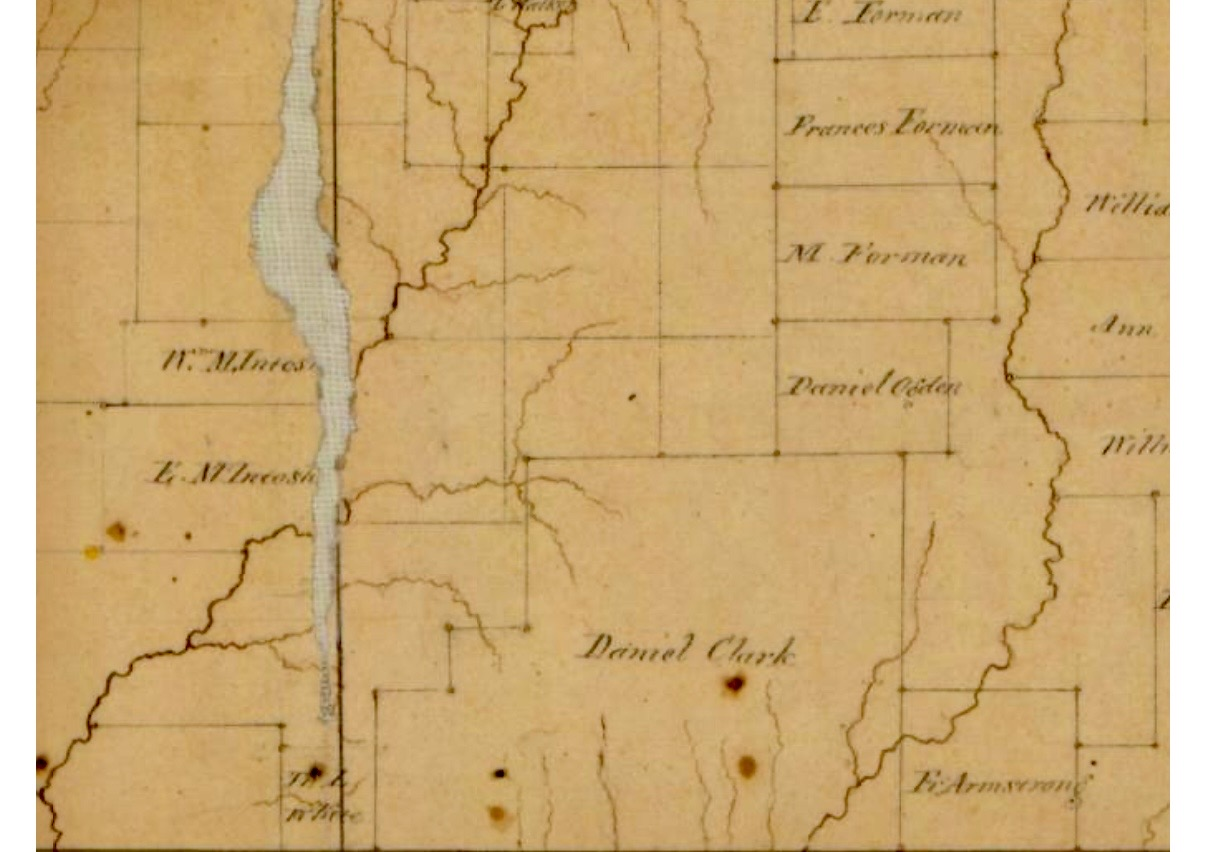
- Born: 1732; Ireland
- Died: July 16, 1800 (aged 67–68); Mississippi Territory, United States

Daniel Clark Sr. (1732–July 16, 1800) was an 18th-century Irish-American merchant and land owner in colonial Pennsylvania and the lower Mississippi River valley. Clark dealt in groceries, tobacco, and slaves. His nephew, Daniel Clark, left Ireland to join him in business and eventually became an important political figure of Louisiana at the turn of the 19th century. Clark had a business partnership with James Wilkinson, who was both an American general and an employee of the Spanish government. The now-extinct Natchez District town of Clarksville was developed by and named for Clark.

== Migration, military service, and early career ==
Clark was originally from County Sligo, Ireland. He came to the British colonies in North America in the 1750s, initially settling in Pennsylvania. He served as a lieutenant of the British army in Major James Burd's company of the Third Battalion at Fort Augusta in 1756–57. In 1758 Daniel Clark married Jane Hoops, a daughter of Adam Hoops. Hoops was considered a "one-man financial institution" in colonial Pennsylvania, lending large sums of money to business affiliates. Clark initially worked for his father-in-law in Carlisle, Pennsylvania. The Clarks moved to Philadelphia in 1761. In Philadelphia Clark initially opened a store, advertising that he had "to sell, for Cash or short Credit, at the Store lately occupied by Messieurs Standley and Fullton, a Neat Assortment of dry Goods, which he imported in the last Vessels from London and Liverpool." He dealt in furniture, china, and leather. Clark continued to send ships back and forth between Europe and North America "throughout the early 1760s."

Hoops supported his son-in-law financially in many ways, giving him seed money for investments, acting as a silent partner, and by "bailing him out" when Clark's investments failed to provide the anticipated return. Among Clark's enterprises was ownership of the 90-ton ship Jenny and partial ownership of the brigantine Sally. From 1762 to 1770, Hoops served as an underwriter on a series of marine insurance policies for Clark.

Clark's interest in the lower Mississippi River valley began around 1765, when he traveled to British West Florida to look at land he had been granted as a reward for his service in the French and Indian War. He had been awarded 3,000 acres in the Natchez District. While he was in West Florida during this period he served as assistant to the governor in Mobile for a while, and "clerk of the council of West Florida" at Pensacola.

He received other West Florida land grants, on January 15, 1768, including 1,000 acres near the Natchez fort, which James McIntosh owned later, another tract of 2,000, that later became the property of James Dallas, 1,000 acres on Lake Maurepas, and 500 acres near Fort Bute.

Daniel Clark returned to Philadelphia from west Florida in late 1768 or early 1769. In 1769 Hoops granted Clark property in Carlisle, and Cumberland County, and gave him about £1,000, and in his 1771 will, Hoops mentioned how he had helped out Clark "before he failed." Hoops also gave his daughter and son-in-law "on an estate in Lower Makefield Township in Bucks County which he bought at a sheriff's sale." Clark sold that estate in 1773 to move to Natchez territory.

During the American Revolutionary War, Clark supported the Continentals, encouraged "the Spanish conquest of Natchez district," and gave large sums of money to Oliver Pollock "to cover bills incurred by the Continental Congress." Working out of Philadelphia and Virginia during the war, Clark was agent for the tobacco business of financier Robert Morris. In 1784 or 1785 he went back to the Natchez District and New Orleans, where he traded in manufactured goods, groceries, and slaves. As was common for Anglo-American merchants of the era, one of his key roles was dealing with "Spanish subjects to facilitate their trading ventures."

== Post-Revolutionary War career ==
In the 1780s he encouraged his nephew and namesake Daniel Clark to come to New Orleans to work in the business. The younger Clark arrived in 1786, and started out as a clerk for the firm of Clark & Rees in New Orleans. Clark's business partner at that time was Ebenezer Rees. The Spanish Governor, Esteban Rodríguez Miró, then hired him to work as a secretary and English interpreter "a role that provided his uncle the duty-free import of 'a cargo of negroes, cattle, tobacco, flour, bacon, lard, and apples.'" Meanwhile, the elder Clark was appointed to be an alcalde (Spanish municipal magistrate), and began racking up land acquisitions, including 565 acres on Second Creek, and 1,020 acres on the Mississippi, both in 1787, 1,000 acres in what is now Wilkinson County, Mississippi in 1789, 600 acres on the Mississippi in 1793, and 5,800 acres at Bayou Sara in 1794. Throughout this period, Clark "bought and sold lands by the thousands of acres in various parts of the district."

Clark was also one of the principal slave merchants of New Orleans in the period 1783 to 1796; extant records show that he sold 289 people. According to historian D. B. Chambers, Clark used his government job as consular agent of the United States at New Orleans "to further his mercantile business, and in the 1790s was trading regularly with the Philadelphia firm of Reed and Forde. As early as 1786, he was selling large consignments of slaves imported from Jamaica, including 156 on the Nueva Orleans (of whom fully 74 were described as sick with 'epilepsy, leprosy or insanity'). He also sold slaves off the 1787 Maria Magdalena (from Jamaica and Saint-Domingue), and the 1788 Governador Miro (from Jamaica and Dominica)." Clark also owned ships that brought slaves to the New Orleans slave market in the 1780s and 1790s. He was, in part, a "re-exporter," bringing slaves from the Caribbean rather than directly from Africa; for instance in 1786, Clark imported and resold 170 people shipped from Kingston, British colonial Jamaica.

Clark also became business partners with James Wilkinson, who was both a general in the American army and a spy on the payroll of the Spanish, and together they were important advisers to governor Miró. Wilkinson had arrived in New Orleans in 1787, been introduced to Governor Miró, swore his allegiance to Spain, and Clark had become his "agent." Together Clark and Wilkinson "encouraged the Louisiana–Kentucky trade by subsidies" and simultaneously initiated a local "tobacco crisis." Their methods were improper: "In August 1788 Wilkinson, Clark Sr., and Isaac Dunn signed 'Articles of Agreement' to foster a three-way trade involving merchandise imported from Philadelphia, western raw materials, and Louisiana specie—all completely illegal according to Spanish policy. In a letter written two months earlier, Colonel Clark had carefully explained the methods (judicious bribery, loopholes in mercantile policy) by which these products could be smuggled into and out of New Orleans." Wilkinson (and Clark) had a monopoly on "selling Kentucky produce in the Louisiana metropolis," which ultimately failed due to the "opposition by the rank-and-file" of settlers. Nonetheless, Clark and Wilkinson's trading firm in operation 1787 to 1791 "proved less rewarding than anticipated." The details of the failure are not well understood but the "alliance ended with General Wilkinson owing the elder Clark a goodly sum of money thus suggesting that the fault lay with Wilkinson." Historians have called this the Spanish Conspiracy, or alternatively, the Wilkinson Conspiracy.

He was on the Spanish census of Natchez inhabitants in 1792, living near Buffalo Creek. During the period of political instability in 1797 that preceded the eventual transfer of the Natchez District to the United States, local residents created competing committees supporting different political factions. The first, which was created in July 1797 and was generally composed of merchants who supported the views of Andrew Ellicott, was known as the Committee of Safety and consisted of Gabriel Benoist, Joseph Bernard, Peter Bryan Bruin, Daniel Clark Sr., Robert Dixon, Philander Smith, Isaac Gaillard, and Frederick Kimball. The committee organized in September 1797, which was composed largely of plantation owners and "debtors" and was loyal to adventurer Anthony Hutchins, consisted of Abner Green, Thomas Green Sr., Chester Ashley, Daniel Burnet, Landon Davis, Justice King, Dr. John Shaw, and James Stuart. When the Natchez District became the Mississippi Territory of the United States, Clark was one of the "men of means" who aligned himself with the Federalist Party generally and territorial governor Winthrop Sargent specifically. Sargent rewarded him by appointing him commander of the militia of Adams County, Mississippi Territory (the southern half of the Natchez District, contra Pickering County), and senior justice of the courts of quarter sessions and common pleas. Clark's plantation in this section was just north of the international boundary, and this was eventually surveyed and mapped as the settlement of Clarksville, and was where Louisiana governor Baron Carondelet "first proposed the boundary commission should meet."

By 1798 Daniel Clark Sr. was semi-retired from the groceries, tobacco, and slaves business, leaving his nephew to manage things. He was heavily indebted as well, so his expenses were paid from an annuity arranged by his nephew. He may have been appointed lieutenant colonial of the territorial militia for Adams County in 1799; following his death, "Banajah Osman" was appointed to replace him.

Daniel Clark Sr. died of a fever in 1800. His widow, Jane Hoops Clark, left the lower Mississippi and returned to her family in Philadelphia; she died there in 1812.

== Sources ==
- Abernethy, Thomas Perkins (1954). The Burr Conspiracy. New York: Oxford University Press. LCCN 54006907. OCLC 710644.
- Alexander, Elizabeth Urban (2001). Notorious Woman: The Celebrated Case of Myra Clark Gaines. Southern Biography Series. Baton Rouge: LSU Press. ISBN 978-0-8071-5398-7.
- Chambers, Douglas B. (December 2008). "Slave trade merchants of Spanish New Orleans, 1763–1803: Clarifying the colonial slave trade to Louisiana in Atlantic perspective". Atlantic Studies. 5 (3): 335–346. doi:10.1080/14788810802445024. ISSN 1478-8810.
- Ingersoll, Thomas N. (1996). "The Slave Trade and the Ethnic Diversity of Louisiana's Slave Community". Louisiana History: The Journal of the Louisiana Historical Association. 37 (2): 133–161. ISSN 0024-6816. JSTOR 4233285.
- James, D. Clayton (1993) [1968]. Antebellum Natchez (Reprint ed.). Baton Rouge: Louisiana State University Press. ISBN 978-0-8071-1860-3. LCCN 68028496. OCLC 448975.
- Lee, Kristin Condotta (2018). "Trading Spaces: Commerce, Ethnicity, and Early Irish New Orleans". Louisiana History: The Journal of the Louisiana Historical Association. 59 (3): 261–307. ISSN 0024-6816. JSTOR 26564809.
- Roberts, Priscilla H.; Tull, James N. (2000). "Adam Hoops, Thomas Barclay, and the House in Morrisville Known as Summerseat, 1764–1791". Transactions of the American Philosophical Society. 90 (5): i–106. doi:10.2307/1586011. ISSN 0065-9746. JSTOR 1586011.
- Rowland, Dunbar, ed. (1907a). "Daniel Clark". Mississippi: Comprising Sketches of Counties, Towns, Events, Institutions, and Persons, Arranged in Cyclopedic Form. Vol. I: A–K. Atlanta: Southern Historical Publishing Association. pp. 445–446. OCLC 3739378 – via HathiTrust.
- Rowland, Dunbar, ed. (1907b). "Territorial Militia". Mississippi: Comprising Sketches of Counties, Towns, Events, Institutions, and Persons, Arranged in Cyclopedic Form. Vol. II. Atlanta: Southern Historical Publishing Association. pp. 240–243. OCLC 3739378 – via Google Books.
- Wohl, Michael S. (1984). A Man in Shadow: The Life of Daniel Clark (Ph.D. thesis). New Orleans: Tulane University. OCLC 23944928.
