= Nanachehaw, Mississippi =

Extinct settlement

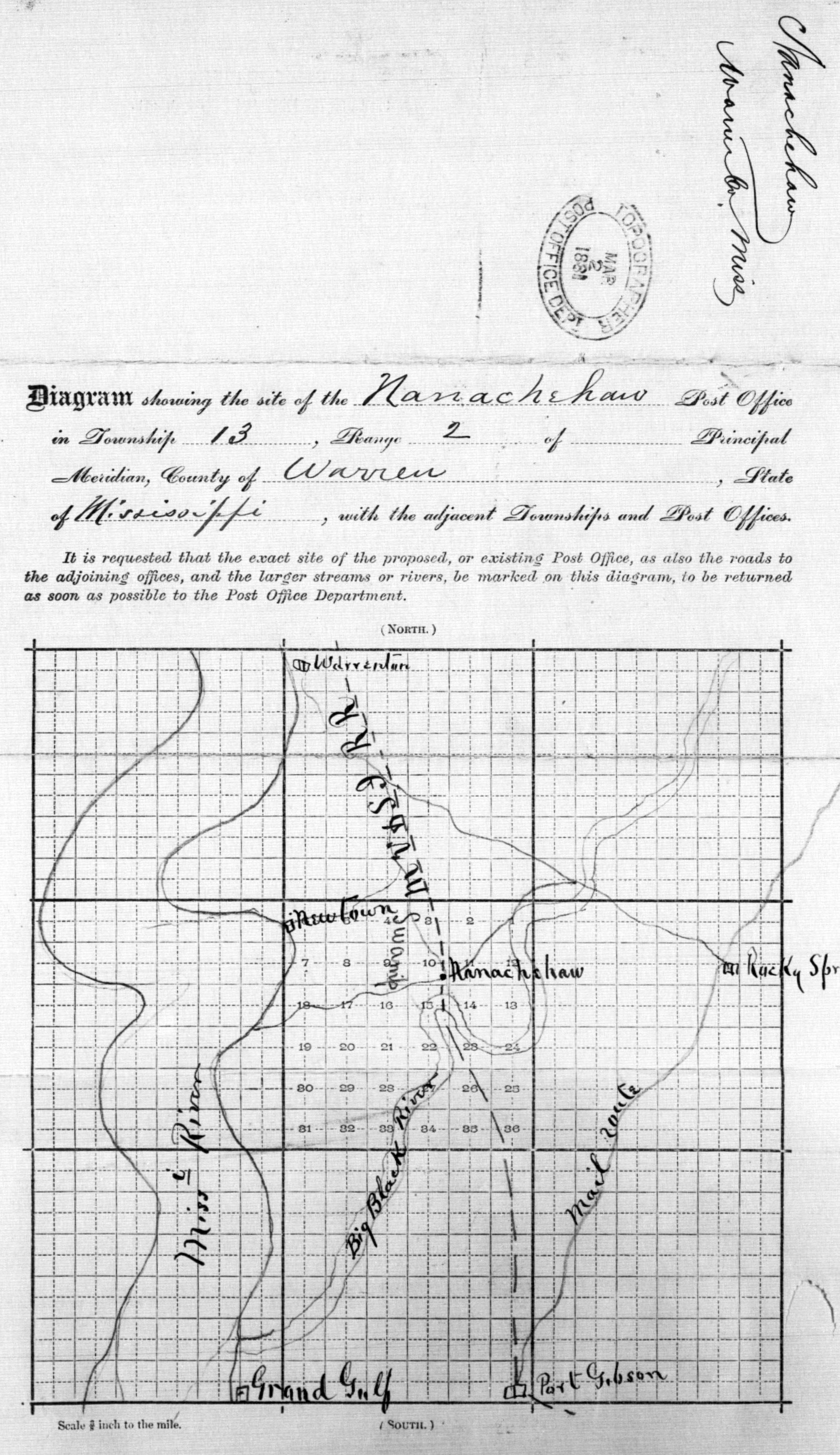
1881 post office department map of Nanachehaw, Warren County, Mississippi

Nanachehaw is an extinct settlement of Warren County, Mississippi, United States, located in the Walnut Hills near the Big Black River. An alternative name was Allen Station. One folk etymology had it that the name meant "fish hill", but a study of Muskogean language place names states Nanchehaw comes from "nanachiha, a kind of cedar".

== History ==
It was the site of an 18th-century Indian trading post run by Garret Rapalje and his sons. In 1796 George Rapalje made a list in his journal of the kinds of scrap iron abandoned by past settlers that he had found in the vicinity of Nanchehaw. According to the Mississippi Department of Archives and History, "Nanachehaw Plantation, originally founded by the Rapalje family, was located on a fairly flat stretch of high ground along the Loosa Chitto, near a place the Choctaw called 'Nanachehaw'...Eventually, the plantation was managed by the Charles Allen family in the 1850s and 1860s...In 1860, the Nanachehaw plantation consisted of at least 793 acres, producing both cotton and corn and used the labor of 113 enslaved persons, including 38 children, throughout the plantation as field hands, loggers, carpenters, cooks, nurses, and others." Nanachehaw plantation was offered for rent after the American Civil War. Nanachehaw post office opened in 1881 along the Mississippi Valley and Ship Island Railroad with a postmaster named C. B. Allen.

The road to Allen was off U.S. Route 61 at Yokena. Several of the deaths from a "midnight cyclone" that was part of the tornado outbreak of June 5–6, 1916 were on the road between Yokena and Nanachehaw. The town eventually had "two hotels, one for white and one for black, several stores and numerous houses and a school served the bustling settlement". The major industry was the Allen Cooperate Compay, which employed "several hundred workers on the payroll at the sawmill, stave mill, and veneer plant". Allen Station was a stop on the Illinois Central Railroad and predecessors. The town withered away when the sawmill closed. The Nanachehaw post office closed in 1947. The voting location at Allen's Station was defunct by 1948.
