= Clarksville, Mississippi =

Clarksville
- Ghost town
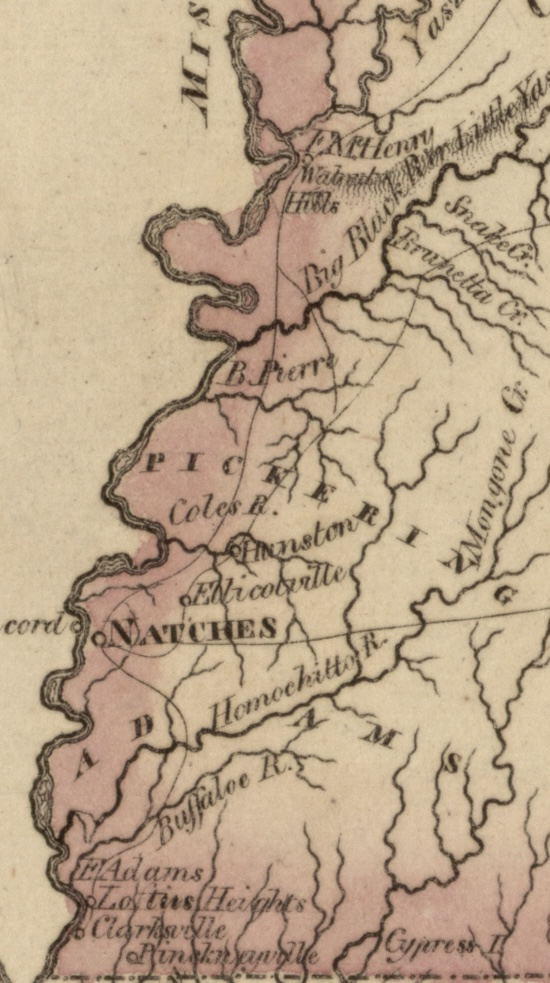
- American Natchez District mapped c. 1800 showing Clarksville lower left

- Location within Mississippi
- Coordinates: 31°3′6.8″N 91°33′15.5″W
- Country: United States
- State: Mississippi
- County: Wilkinson
- Time zone: UTC-6 (Central (CST))
  - Summer (DST): UTC-5 (CDT)

Clarksville is a ghost town in Wilkinson County, Mississippi, United States.

Located directly on the Mississippi River approximately 2.25 mi (3.62 km) south of Fort Adams, Clarksville was one of the earliest non-Native settlements in Mississippi, and was considered a place of great promise.

Clark Creek joined the Mississippi River at Clarksville, and the settlement was located on the south bank of the creek. Approximately 3.5 mi (5.6 km) south of Clarksville is the historically-significant 31st parallel north, which now forms the border between Mississippi and Louisiana, and approximately 5 mi (8.0 km) south of Clarksville is the current location of the Louisiana State Penitentiary.

== History ==
The namesake was a Philadelphia furniture, china, and leather merchant whose father-in-law, Adam Hoops, started him in business in 1760. During the French and Indian War the subject was a lieutenant in Major James Burd's company at Fort Augusta in 1756. In 1768, Daniel J. Clark Sr., Irishman, merchant and former captain of a Pennsylvania regiment in the British Army, obtained grants for thousands of acres of land in what was then West Florida. One of the grants was near Natchez on St. Catherine's Creek and another was for 500 acres (200 ha) of riverfront land in what is now Wilkinson County. Clark settled there and established a slave-labor plantation.

In 1797, Clarksville was the last base Andrew Ellicott used to survey the 31st latitude. There, Ellicott determined he was "three mile, and two hundred perches too far north" of the 31st parallel. Ellicott wrote that it would be:

impracticable to convey our instruments, baggage and stores directly from Clarksville, to the most eligible place, owing to the extreme unevenness of the country on the one hand, and the banks of the Mississippi not being sufficiently inundated on the other, to give us passage by water through swamps and small lakes.

Ellicot also provided a detailed description of the land east of the Mississippi River at Clarksville:

The first twenty miles of country over which the line passed, is perhaps as fertile as any in the United States; and at the same time the most impenetrable, and could only be explored by using the cane knife and hatchet. The whole face of the country being covered with strong canes, which stood almost as close together as hemp stalks, and generally from twenty to thirty five feet high, and matted together by various species of vines, that connected them with the boughs of the lofty timber, which was very abundant. The hills are numerous, short, and steep: from those untoward circumstances, we were scarcely ever able to open one-fourth of a mile per day, and frequently much less.

Early settlers believed Clarksville had potential to be a significant settlement. In 1799, Clarkville was established as a port used by the government for revenue collection. That same year, William Dunbar, a friend of Clark's, wrote a letter to Winthrop Sargent, the territorial governor, telling him that "Clarksville destined by nature, to become a considerable place at a future day, possesses advantages which give it a decided preference". Dunbar wrote that the settlement was "the first safe and commodious landing place north of the line of demarcation at 31 degrees", and that Clarksville was a "handsome plain ornamented by seven elegant Indian mounts" which will "become the site of a great commercial town". Clark Creek could be "converted into a grand Canal capable of conveying the largest commercial boats into and beyond the town", and that the creek formed a "harbour of perfect security" along the Mississippi River. As well, Clarksville could be protected by the soldiers stationed at Fort Adams. One objection to Dunbar's hopes for Clarksville described how "the country in the neighborhood of Clarksville is but thinly inhabited by persons, generally of small property; no person has as yet been induced to think the situation sufficiently advantageous, to establish a trading house at Clarksville". His grave was near the Mississippi River on top of an Indian mound, but the site was washed away by the meandering river many years ago.

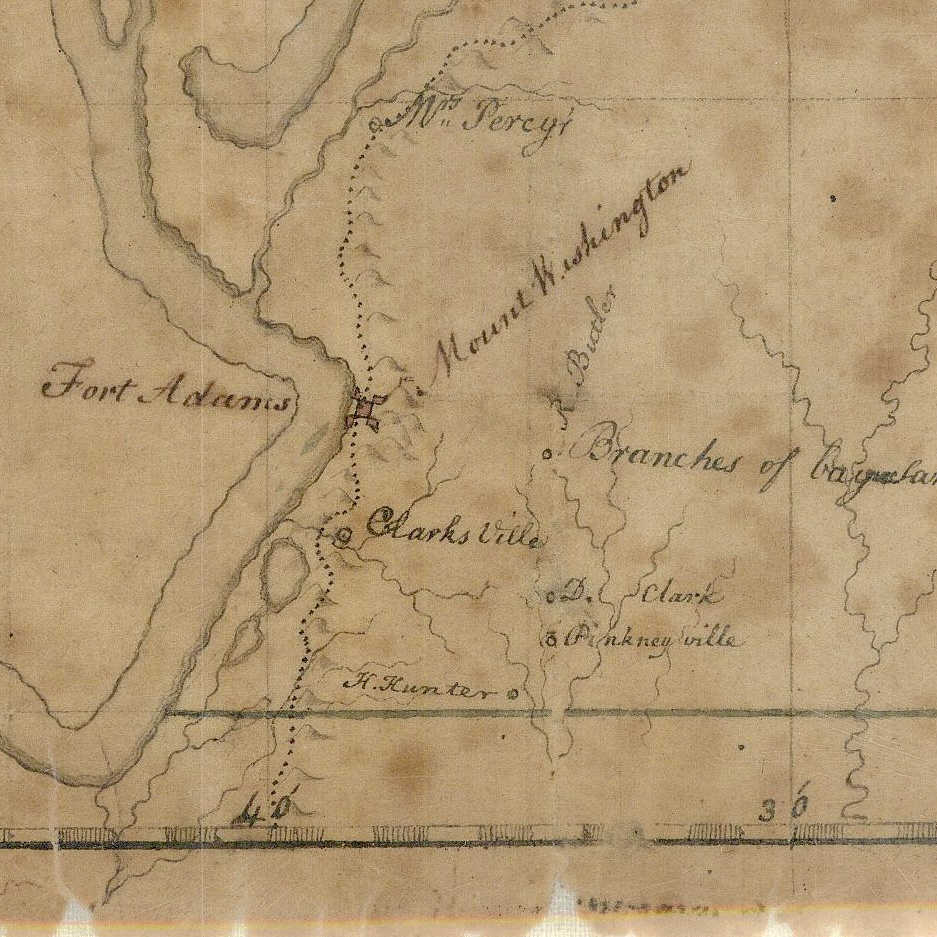
Detail of 1800 United States survey of Natchez District near Fort Adams showing Clarksville and residence of D. Clark

A public meeting of Natchez citizens on June 13, 1797 recommended Anthony Hutchins for territorial Governor. In 1798 President John Adams appointed Clark to be a judge for the Mississippi territory. Also the subject was given the rank of Lieutenant Colonel when the Adams County militia was organized on October 25, 1798.

When the elder Clark died in 1800 he had become deeply involved in the politics, of the Mississippi Territory with the younger Clark handling his New Orleans business. His considerable holdings were inherited by his nephew, Daniel J. Clark Jr., who replaced Evan Jones as the United States ambassador to French Louisiana, became one of the wealthiest English-speaking citizens in New Orleans and the first Delegate from the Territory of Orleans elected to the United States House of Representatives. He was also involved in the Burr conspiracy, and once wounded William C. C. Claiborne, the first territorial governor of Mississippi, in a duel.

Clarksville appeared on a map of the Mississippi Territory in 1804, and continued to appear on some maps and was mentioned in records until the late 1800s. The river landing is referenced in newspaper navigation notices in 1870.

In the census of 1805, the population of Clarksville was two white males over 21, two whites males under 21, two white females, and 130 slaves. In 1840, just after the great Natchez tornado, lawyer John T. McMurran bought half of Clarksville Plantation and later renamed it to Riverside Plantation.

Two cemeteries were located near Clarksville. The Riverside Cemetery was a short distance west of Clarksville, and was used between 1835 and 1860. The cemetery is overgrown with vegetation, but the markers of several graves are still visible. The Clarksville Cemetery is located north of the settlement, and contains grave markers from as recent as 1988, indicating that the cemetery continued to be used long after Clarksville ceased to exist.

Access to the former settlement is by Fort Adams Main Street, a dirt road which runs south from Fort Adams, then east along the north bank of Clark Creek. Several cottages and hunting lodges are located nearby, though nothing remains of Clarksville.

The plantation of the Clarks is within the natural area called Clark Creek State Park, but no historic interpretation exists at the site.
