= Julien de Lallande Poydras =

American poet

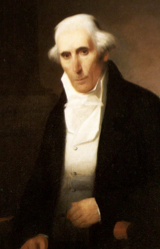

Delegate to the U.S. House of Representatives from the Orleans Territory's at-large district
- In office March 4, 1809 – March 3, 1811
- Preceded by: Daniel Clark
- Succeeded by: Thomas B. Robertson (Representative)

Personal details
- Born: April 3, 1746 Rezé, France
- Died: June 14, 1824 (aged 78) Pointe Coupee Parish, Louisiana, U.S.
- Party: Independent

Julien de Lallande (Lalande) Poydras (April 3, 1740 – June 23, 1824) was a French American merchant, planter, financier, poet, educator and political leader who served as Delegate from the Territory of Orleans to the U.S. House of Representatives from 1809 to 1811. He was a catalyst in the promotion of Louisiana statehood and helped draft the state's first constitution. He served as the first president of the Louisiana State Senate from 1812 to 1813.

== Biography ==
He was born in Rezé (near Nantes), then in the French province of Brittany. He served in the French Navy and was captured by the British in 1760 and taken to England. He escaped on board a West Indian merchantman to Saint-Domingue, from which he emigrated to Spanish Louisiana in 1768.

Poydras was a pioneer businessman, trading first as an itinerant merchant before establishing stores in his domicile of Pointe Coupee Parish. He invested in real estate, buying and selling plantations and retaining some major properties for the cultivation of cotton and sugar cane. He built a number of structures during the late 18th and early 19th centuries, including North Bend plantation house, in 1835, on False River, and owned properties in New Orleans.

Poydras wrote the first poetry ever published in Louisiana in 1779, in honor of Don Bernardo de Gálvez's victory over British troops at the Battle of Baton Rouge, popularly said to have been the only battle of the American Revolutionary War fought outside of the Thirteen Colonies.

Poydras's reputation was that of an especially indulgent slaveholder. Yet, while on business in Philadelphia in 1795, a major slave conspiracy began on several plantations along the Mississippi River including Poydras's home plantation. The conspirators were quickly apprehended and several were executed.

Julien Poydras willed that his slaves and their offspring be freed 25 years after his death, and all were to be provided with annuities in the meantime. Though his heirs supported his wishes, the time of the anticipated manumission (1849) coincided with the growing abolitionist movement. Fearful of its consequences, the Louisiana State Legislature prohibited any manumissions, and Poydras's slaves remained in bondage until Union troops entered Pointe Coupee Parish in connection with the Siege of Port Hudson in 1863 — an additional 14 years.

Poydras served Louisiana as a U.S. Delegate during the territorial period and, subsequently, in the Louisiana State Senate. He served in a number of community offices in Pointe Coupee, including the post of civil commandant (under Spanish rule), justice of the peace and church warden.

After a long and active life, Julien Poydras died on his home plantation near Point Coupee, Louisiana. He was originally interred in Old St. Francis Cemetery. In 1891, his remains were reinterred on the grounds of the Poydras School in New Roads, when the old cemetery caved into the Mississippi River.

OBITUARY of Julien Poydras 1824, on the 25th of June, at Point Coupee, Louisiana; JULIEN POYDRAS, esq. Mr. P. was a man of very large fortune, and magnificent disposition. He was the first Delegate in Congress, from the territory of Orleans. The act, which no doubt will do most honour to his memory, is the foundation of the Female Orphan Asylum, to which he devoted £100,000. Long after many celebrated names shall have been sunk in oblivion, the name of Julien Poydras will be remembered by the innocent creatures who, by his wise providence and humanity, shall have been sheltered against the misfortune and danger which result from misery, for a weak defenseless sex. By his will he left for a college at Pointe Coupee, 20,000 dollars. For marriage portions to poor girls of said parish, 30,000 dollars. To each of his god-sons and goddaughters, 5,000 dollars. For marriage portions to poor girls of the parish of West Baton Rouge, 30,000 dollars. To the Charity Hospital of New Orleans, his house on the Levee, between St. Louis and Conti streets, and his house in Bourbon street. To the Poydras Female Asylum, all his houses in Poydras Street, and on the Batture. The remainder of his fortune goes to his family with the exception of some legacies to his friends.

In Pointe Coupee the legacy has been diverted to educational purposes, but in West Baton Rouge it continues in its original use [1941]. Poydras himself was a bachelor. It is said that, when he came to Louisiana, he owned little more than the pack on his back and, as the girl he loved was too poor to furnish a dowry, it was impossible for them to marry.

== Legacy ==
Among the philanthropic works during his lifetime, Julien Poydras founded the Poydras Asylum in New Orleans, originally a home for female orphans. The community transitioned to nursing care for elderly females but now accommodating persons of both genders. The Poydras Home has expanded in recent years to a continuing care retirement community complete with Independent, Assisted Living, Nursing Care and an Adult Day Program on its historic Magazine Street campus.

One of Julien Poydras's more unusual bequests was for dowries of indigent brides in Pointe Coupee and West Baton Rouge Parishes. Legend attributes Julien's lifelong single status to the inability of his fiancée's family to provide the usual dowry in order for them to marry. Although the dowry fund in Pointe Coupee Parish was combined with the educational fund, the dowries continued to be issued on an annual basis at least until 1991 in West Baton Rouge Parish, each year's brides receiving an equal share of the interest accrued on the principal during the year.

One of the main streets of the New Orleans Central Business District has been named Poydras ever since Julien Poydras owned property there. There is an elegant residential thoroughfare in New Roads called Poydras. A succession of New Roads Schools were named for the philanthropist: Poydras College, Poydras School of New Roads, Poydras Academy, and Poydras High School. The latter, built in 1924, is now home to the Julien Poydras Museum and Cultural Center, a project of the Pointe Coupee Parish Historical Society. There is also a town in St. Bernard Parish called Poydras.

U.S. House of Representatives
Preceded by Daniel Clark	Delegate to the U.S. House of Representatives from the Orleans Territory's at-large congressional district 1809–1811	Succeeded by Thomas B. Robertson as U.S. Representative
