= Orleans Territory's at-large congressional district =

Former US House delegate's district

- Obsolete district
- Created: 1806, as a non-voting delegate was granted by Congress
- Eliminated: 1812, as a result of statehood as Louisiana
- Years active: 1806–1812

The Territory of Orleans was the name given to most of what is now the state of Louisiana (excluding that portion of the state which is west of the Sabine River). From 1806 until 1811, the territory sent one non-voting delegate (an "at-large" delegate) to the United States House of Representatives.

== List of delegates representing the district ==
Delegate	Party	Years	Cong ress	Electoral history
District created
Daniel Clark (New Orleans)	[data missing]	December 1, 1806 – March 3, 1809	9th 10th	Elected August 1, 1806 to finish the term. Re-elected September 10, 1806 to the next term. Lost renomination.
Julien de Lallande Poydras (New Orleans)	[data missing]	March 4, 1809 – March 3, 1811	11th	Elected in 1808. [data missing]
Vacant		March 3, 1811 – April 29, 1812	12th	No election was held in 1810, in anticipation of Louisiana statehood. Allan B. Magruder and Eligius Fromentin meanwhile served as "agents" in the U.S. House.
District eliminated

== See also ==
- List of United States congressional districts
