= George Rapalje =

American merchant (1757–c. 1816)

Rapalje on Big Black River circa 1802 (Barthelmy Lafon map)

George Rapalje (1757–d. c. 1816) was an 18th-century settler of the Mississippi River valley. Originally from the British province of New York, he and several siblings migrated to the province of West Florida about the time of the American Revolutionary War. He is best remembered today for the journal he kept for a decade at a remote trading post on the Big Black River, and for marrying into another wealthy family of settlers. He was indicted for murder by a grand jury in Mississippi Territory in 1800.

== Family ==
George Rapalje was the son of Garret Rapalje, a "prominent merchant-shipper associated with Peter Remsen" who settled in the lower Mississippi River valley in the late 18th century. The Rapaljes were a family from Long Island, New York that had been in the colonies since the 17th century and were Loyalists during the American Revolutionary War. Children of Garret and Diana Rapalje was painted c. 1768 by John Durand; as noted on the back of the painting: "Jaques Rapalje born in 1752 / Garret dº 1757 / George dº 1759 / Anne dº 1762". The painting is now held in the collection of the New-York Historical Society.

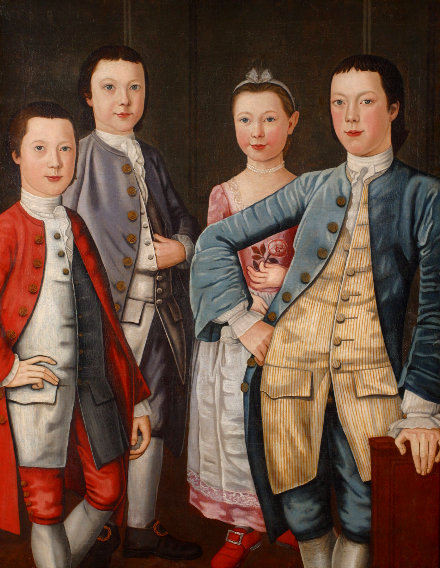
George Rapalje, far left, at about age 11, painted in the Province of New York

The Rapaljes had been interested in what was then the western reach of the British backwater province of West Florida since 1773, when Jacques Rapalje communicated to governor Peter Chester and the provincial council that he was looking at a large tract of land for settlement on behalf of his father Garret Rapalje. Garret Ralapje Sr., James (Jacques) Rapalje, Garret Rapalje Jr., Isaac Rapalje, and George Rapalje were among the members of the family who settled land in the lower Mississippi River in the 1770s and 1780s.

== Career ==
In April 1781, a George Rapalje was part of a conspiracy of men determined to prevent the Spanish from taking over the Natchez District. According to one history, "...with friends joining them numbered about two hundred, prepared to make a stand against the Spaniards at White Cliffs, but soon received word that General Campbell had been defeated and that, West Florida had become a Spanish province...John Alston with another small party of loyalists, which seems to have included Captains Blomart and Winfrey, Parker Carradine, George Rapalje, John Smith, and William Eason, made his way to the Creek nation, where he and his companions were arrested by the Indians. After being carried to Mobile, they were forwarded to New Orleans and condemned to death on the charge of rebellion, but were pardoned by the governor". Historian Albert Tate asserts that George Rapalje "is not mentioned as a leader of the revolt, and he was not one of the rebels imprisoned at New Orleans; he is mentioned briefly as an emissary to the Spanish commander of the inhabitants who were still loyal."

George Rapalje of Natchez, West Florida, North America was listed as bankrupt in a British newspaper in 1787. Rapalje had a trading post at Nanachehaw on the Big Black River where he traded with White settlers and the western band of Choctaw (Chahta). Among the products he sold or traded for animal pelts were "knives, axes, blankets, salt, sugar, coffee, salve, thread, razors, silk handkerchiefs, trousers, shirts (some with ruffles), powder, bullets, ear rings, beads, gun flints, cheese, venison hams, ducks, and geese." His journal, which covers the dates April 9, 1788, to April 1, 1797, is a valuable primary source document for studying the pioneer economy of colonial-territorial Mississippi.

== Indictment ==
According to the minute books of the Mississippi Territory courts, he was indicted in 1800 for the murder of John Cotty.

== Personal life ==
He was married to Jane Ellis, daughter of early Mississippi settler Richard Ellis. George Rapalje was said to be related to "the Livingstons of New York." If the couple had children, none survived. Upon Jane Ellis Rapalje's death she left "her fortune of bank stocks, cash, slaves and lands consisting of Beaux Pres plantation, the Clifford plantation and the town house and house servants to nieces and nephews. She thus carried out the letter of her father's will which entailed her property by willing that it revert to Ellis heirs".

== See also ==
- Peter Alston

== Sources ==
- Johnson, Cecil (March 1934). "Expansion in West Florida, 1770–1779". The Mississippi Valley Historical Review. 20 (4): 481–496. doi:10.2307/1897187. JSTOR 1897187.
- Rothstein, Morton (1979). "The Changing Social Networks and Investment Behavior of a Slaveholding Elite in the Ante Bellum South: Some Natchez Nabobs, 1800–1860". In Greenfield, Sidney M.; Strickon, Arnold; Aubey, Robert T. (eds.). Entrepreneurs in Cultural Context. School of American Research, Advanced Seminar Series. Albuquerque: University of New Mexico Press. pp. 65–88. ISBN 978-0-8263-0504-6. LCCN 78021433. OCLC 4859059.
- Siebert, Wilbur H. (1916). "The Loyalists in West Florida and the Natchez District". The Mississippi Valley Historical Review. 2 (4): 465–483. doi:10.2307/1886907. ISSN 0161-391X. JSTOR 1886907.
- Tate, Albert (Winter 1983). "Spanish Census of the Baton Rouge District for 1786". Louisiana History: The Journal of the Louisiana Historical Association. 24 (1): 70–84. ISSN 0024-6816. JSTOR 4232241.
