= Laurel Hill Plantation (Adams County, Mississippi) =

Historic church in Mississippi, United States

- U.S. National Register of Historic Places
- Location within Mississippi Location within the United States
- Nearest city: Natchez, Mississippi
- Coordinates: 31°25′20″N 91°24′35″W
- Area: 150 acres (61 ha)
- Built: 1837
- Built by: James Hardie
- Architect: James Hardie
- Architectural style: Gothic Revival
- NRHP reference No.: 82000569
- Added to NRHP: October 26, 1982

The Laurel Hill Plantation in Adams County, Mississippi, about 12 miles (19 km) south of Natchez, Mississippi, is a historic Southern plantation. It was nominated for listing on the National Register of Historic Places, and was listed in 1982. The main house of the plantation, established by Richard Ellis in the late 1700s, burned down in 1967. The listing includes a historic brick church named St. Mary's Chapel (c. 1837) and a building from 1835 to 1840 which was a parsonage for the church, or was an outbuilding to the parsonage, and other outbuildings.

It has been listed on the National Register since October 26, 1982.

== See also ==
- Richard Ellis (Mississippi planter) § Laurel Hill
