= Bayou Sara, Louisiana =

Extinct settlement, West Feliciana

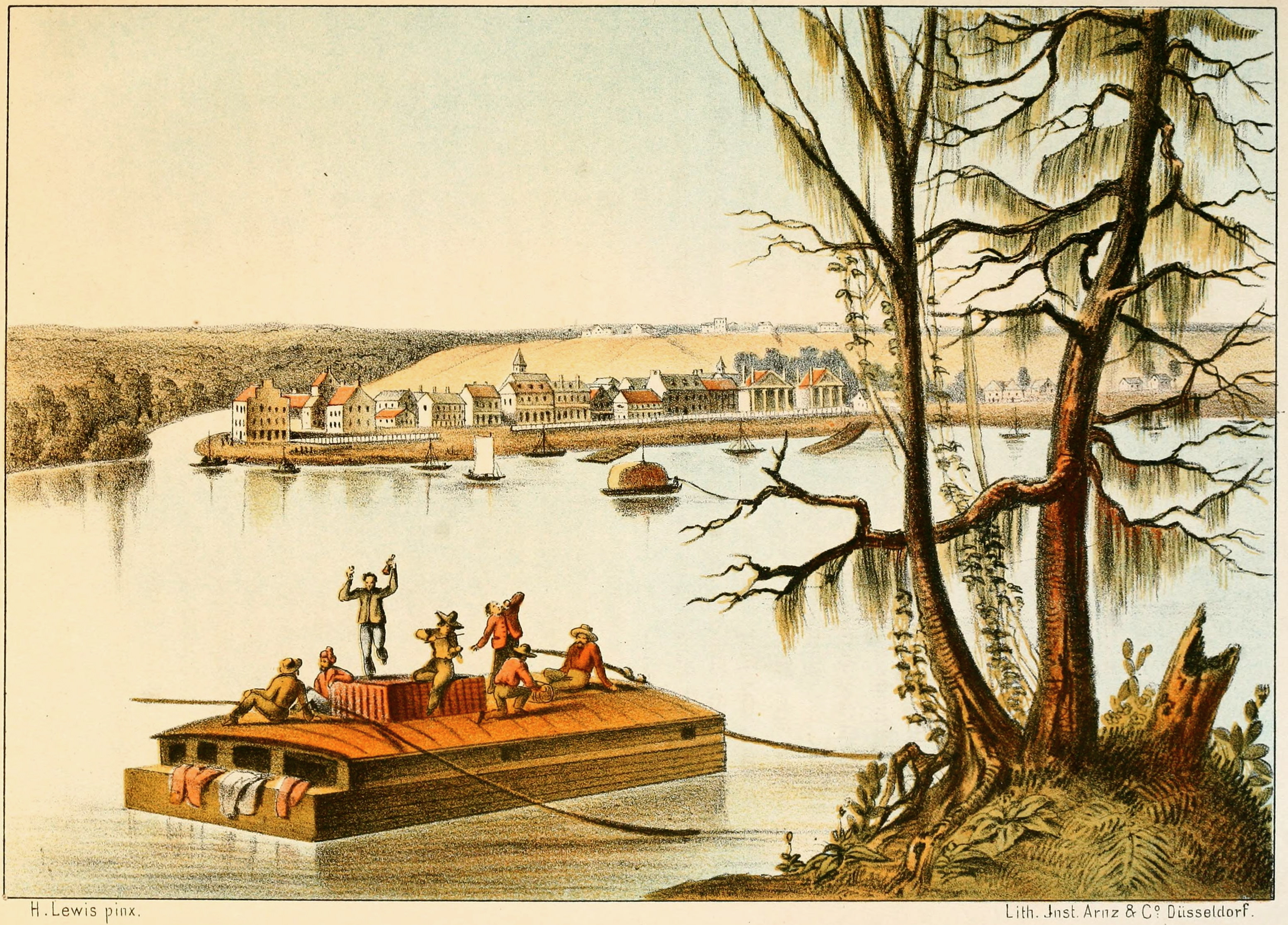
View of Bayou Sara from the River, 1840s, from Henry Lewis's Das illustrirte Mississippithal

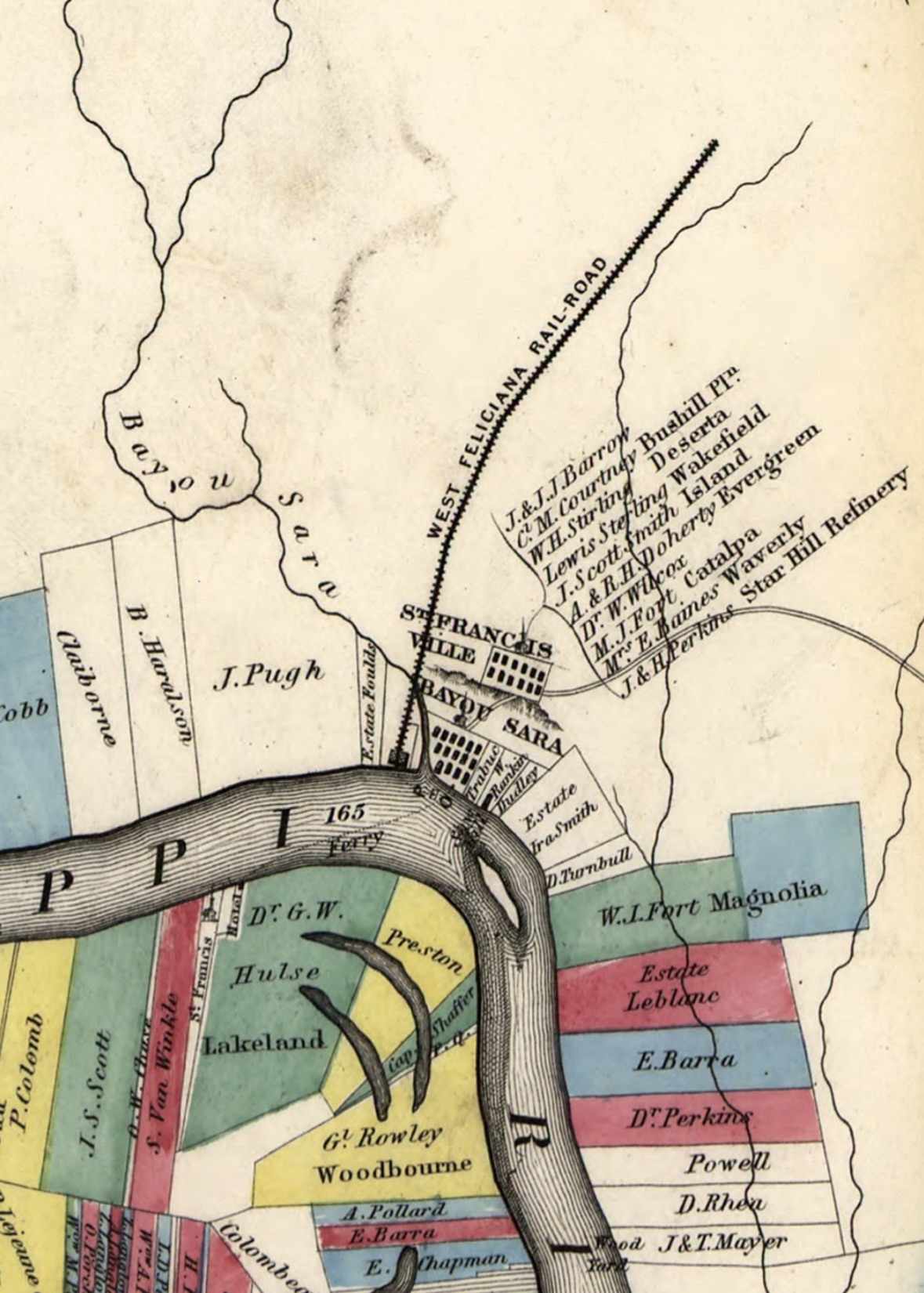
Detail of Bayou Sara from Norman's 1850s chart of the Lower Mississippi showing West Feliciana Railroad

Bayou Sara was a town in West Feliciana Parish, Louisiana, United States until the Mississippi River washed it away in 1927. In the early 1800s it was the most important landing between New Orleans and Natchez, Mississippi. According to the American Guide to Louisiana, Bayou Sara was "founded in 1790 by John H. Mills and Christopher Stewart, who established a trading post on the river which grew into one of the most flourishing ports between Natchez and New Orleans. With the advent of the railroad, trade diminished and the town gradually declined, so that now all that remains of Bayou Sara are a few wooden shacks and a tall, uninscribed monument, and these have been absorbed by St. Francisville."

John H. Mills had originally settled in the Natchez District where he operated a sawmill in partnership with Isaac Johnson near Second Creek. Mills' son Gilbert Mills married Johnson's daughter Ann Waugh Johnson. In 1790 Mills moved south to the vicinity of the Bayou Sarah and in partnership with Christopher Strong Stewart opened a trading post on the batture. Stewart later moved to Mobile, Spanish West Florida, where he died in 1809.

John James Aububon came to Bayou Sara in 1821 and began the nature studies that became the Birds of America. A visitor coming down the river in 1822 reported that "Alligators are numerous along shore" in the vicinity of Bayou Sara and St. Francisville.

The town had its own newspaper, the Bayou Sara Sun, prior to the American Civil War.
