= Daniel Clark (Louisiana politician) =

American politician (c. 1766–1813)

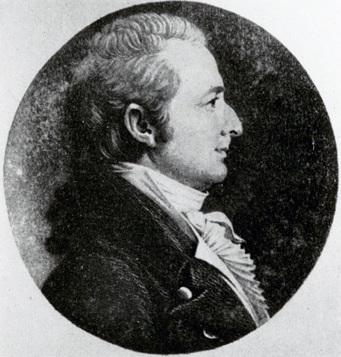

Delegate to the U.S. House of Representatives from the Orleans Territory's at-large district
- In office December 1, 1806 – March 3, 1809
- Preceded by: Constituency established
- Succeeded by: Julien de Lallande Poydras

Personal details
- Born: c. 1766 Sligo, Kingdom of Ireland
- Died: August 13, 1813 (aged 46–47) New Orleans, Louisiana, U.S.
- Party: Independent
- Relatives: Daniel Clark Sr. (uncle)

Daniel Clark (c. 1766 – August 13, 1813) was an Irish-American politician who served as the first delegate from the Territory of Orleans to the United States House of Representatives. Born in Sligo, Ireland, he was reportedly educated at Eton College in England.

Clark emigrated to the United States in the early 1780s, living with family members in Germantown, Pennsylvania. In Philadelphia, he was elected as a member to the American Philosophical Society. In 1786, at the invitation of his merchant uncle, Daniel J. Clark Sr. of Clarksville, Mississippi, he moved to New Orleans in Spanish Louisiana. The younger Clark streaked into the New Orleans economy, conducting at least 64 notarized transactions, mostly the sale of slaves, that year—double the number of transactions ever conducted in New Orleans in a single year before then. However, Clark's only appearance in the 1790s as a major businessman was reflected in his numerous formal protests for debts due him in 1793.

Although he was a Spanish citizen until the late 1790s, Clark worked assiduously in the interests of the U.S. government, providing first-hand, detailed responses to President Thomas Jefferson's questions on Louisiana. Concerned about possible Spanish attempts to hold New Orleans despite the Louisiana Purchase, Clark sent vital military intelligence to Mississippi territorial governor Claiborne and American general Wilkinson, and offered to seize the city for American authorities. On the day of Louisiana's annexation, according to a news account, Clark was "everywhere and had an eye to everything."

Clark engaged in land speculation, planting, ship-owning, and banking, but delegated most of the day-to-day business of the firm to the prominent merchants Chew & Relf, who usually worked with him as partners. He was appointed a member of the first Legislative Council for the Territory of Orleans, but declined. Clark was elected as the territorial representative to the U.S. House of Representatives and served from December 1, 1806, to March 3, 1809. Clark may have believed Jefferson should have appointed him as territorial governor, rather than William Charles Cole Claiborne, then governor of the Mississippi Territory. However, although Clark may have been popular with some of the Spanish elite, the prominent New Orleans merchant Benjamin Morgan cautioned about Clark: "...he is not popular" and "deficient in dignity of character and sterling veracity...liked by few of the Americans here."

Claiborne took offense in 1807 at a speech Clark made on the floor of the House of Representatives, in which Clark maligned Claiborne's having allegedly favored the militia of free people of color over the white militia. When Clark would not apologize, the two men met in a June 8, 1807, duel on Clark's plantation (currently Houmas House, in Ascension Parish, Louisiana).

Clark's pistol round struck Claiborne. Claiborne lamented in a June 17, 1807, letter to President Thomas Jefferson, “My dear sir, I continue confined to my room, and experience considerable pain—but the wound now suppurates profusely and my Surgeon gives me reason to believe that in 3 weeks I shall be enabled to walk—I fear however that the warmth of the weather will considerably retard my recovery.”

Perhaps, in part, because of his duel against Governor Claiborne, Clark was an unsuccessful candidate for renomination to Congress in 1808. A local newspaper opined of Clark, "...in his manners many complain that there is something forbidding; something that keeps at a distance even those who esteem him most." In the following year, he published a long, well-documented diatribe against General Wilkinson, entitled "Proofs of the Corruption of Gen. James Wilkinson, and of his Connexion with Aaron Burr", accusing Wilkinson of being a paid Spanish agent while Wilkinson commanded the U.S. military. Subsequent historians have validated Clark's claims. At the time of the 1810 census, Daniel Clark owned 130 slaves in Wilkinson County, Mississippi Territory. Clark died unexpectedly in New Orleans on 13 August 1813, and is interred in St. Louis Cemetery No. 1.

At the time of his death, he was believed to own about one-third of the real estate in New Orleans. His will and testament, contested by the child of a secret marriage, Myra Clark Gaines, became a legal struggle of titanic proportion fought over seventy years.

== Sources ==
- United States Congress. "Daniel Clark (id: C000426)". Biographical Directory of the United States Congress.

U.S. House of Representatives
New constituency	Delegate to the U.S. House of Representatives from the Orleans Territory's at-large congressional district 1806–1809	Succeeded by Julien de Lallande Poydras
