= Sabine Expedition =

The Sabine Expedition was an expedition approved by the United States Congress in 1806. It was led by Major General Edmund Pendleton Gaines. It consisted of volunteers provided by Alabama, Louisiana, Mississippi, and Tennessee, including militia from Fayetteville in Lincoln County or Athens in McMinn County. Their main goal was to protect the Sabine River, as the boundary between Spanish Texas and Louisiana Territory was undecided.

== See also ==
- Military history of the United States
