= Ellis Cliffs, Mississippi =

- Ghost town
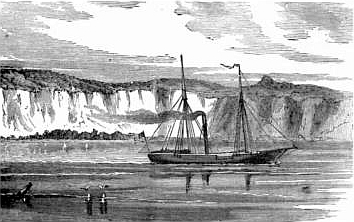
- A view of Ellis Cliffs in 1896

- Location within the state of Mississippi
- Coordinates: 31°24′06″N 91°27′07″W
- Country: United States
- State: Mississippi
- County: Adams
- Elevation: 66 ft (20 m)
- Time zone: UTC-6 (Central (CST))
  - Summer (DST): UTC-5 (CDT)
- GNIS feature ID: 691838

Ellis Cliffs is a ghost town in Adams County, Mississippi, United States.

Situated atop a high chalky bluff overlooking the Mississippi River, the white cliffs were frequently mentioned by early river voyagers.

The settlement was located approximately 14 mi (23 km) south of Natchez, and approximately 1 mi (1.6 km) northeast of Hutchins Landing.

== History ==
The cliffs were known to early explorers and mapped under several names including the White Cliffs, Milk Cliffs, and Browne's Cliffs, after would-be colonizer Montfort Browne.

The settlement is named for Richard Ellis, a native of Virginia who moved to the area with his family around 1785. Prior to Ellis, the Lieutenant Governor of West Florida, Montfort Browne, received a grant of land at this place and planned to locate the civil government at the site.

The Ellis family were one of the first to permanently settle in southwestern Mississippi, which was then still under Spanish rule.

Ellis established a plantation known as "White Cliffs", where "towering cliffs lined the east side of the river, providing a floodproof access to the water and vast acres of virgin land and timber". The foundations of the family's first home were still visible in the early 1900s. He also owned plantations called Homochitto and Laurel Hill, both in Adams County.

When Ellis died in 1792, he had accumulated 6,000 acres (2,400 ha) of land, and more than 150 slaves.

By 1800, both the settlement and the cliffs were known as "Ellis Cliffs".

British artist William Constable visited America between 1806–08 and painted View Down the Mississippi from Ellis's Cliffs, 28 Feby. 1807. Artist John Rowson Smith traveled the Mississippi River before the Civil War and painted The Cotton Region, which included a scene of "the house of a colored slave owner at Ellis Cliffs". Henry Lewis also painted the river, and described Ellis Cliffs as "strikingly bold, wild, and picturesque".

During the Civil War, Confederate batteries were installed at the top of Ellis Cliffs.

The former settlement is today covered by forest, and bordered to the north by the St. Catherine Creek National Wildlife Refuge.

== See also ==
- John Ellis (Mississippi politician)
