= Buffalo River (Mississippi) =

Wilkinson County watercourse

Coordinates: 31°04′24″N 91°33′57″W

USGS 1:24000-scale Quadrangle for Fort Adams, Mississippi (1996)

Buffalo River is a watercourse of Wilkinson County, Mississippi, United States. Also known as Buffalo Bayou, it is the "lowermost eastern major tributary to the Mississippi River." In the early 19th century it was sometimes called Buffalo Creek. Its headwaters are around Centreville, with some draining from Amite County. The Buffalo "heads up in the sandy hills of eastern Wilkinson County" before turning south and draining into the Mississippi River. Its course between the headwaters and the Mississippi continually shifts, and currently it feeds the Old Homochitto River, where it supplies several bald cypress-dominated swamplands, and Lake Mary, an old oxbow channel of the Mississippi. Its tributaries include Little Buffalo and Browns Creek. Buffalo River is a popular location for fishing and hunting. The Buffalo River supports at least 95 species of fish.

== See also ==
- List of rivers of Mississippi
- Clark Creek Natural Area
- Homochitto National Forest
- St. Catherine Creek National Wildlife Refuge
- Bayou Sara, Louisiana
