= Second Creek (Mississippi) =

Waterway in Adams County

Coordinates: 31°20′06″N 91°21′25″W

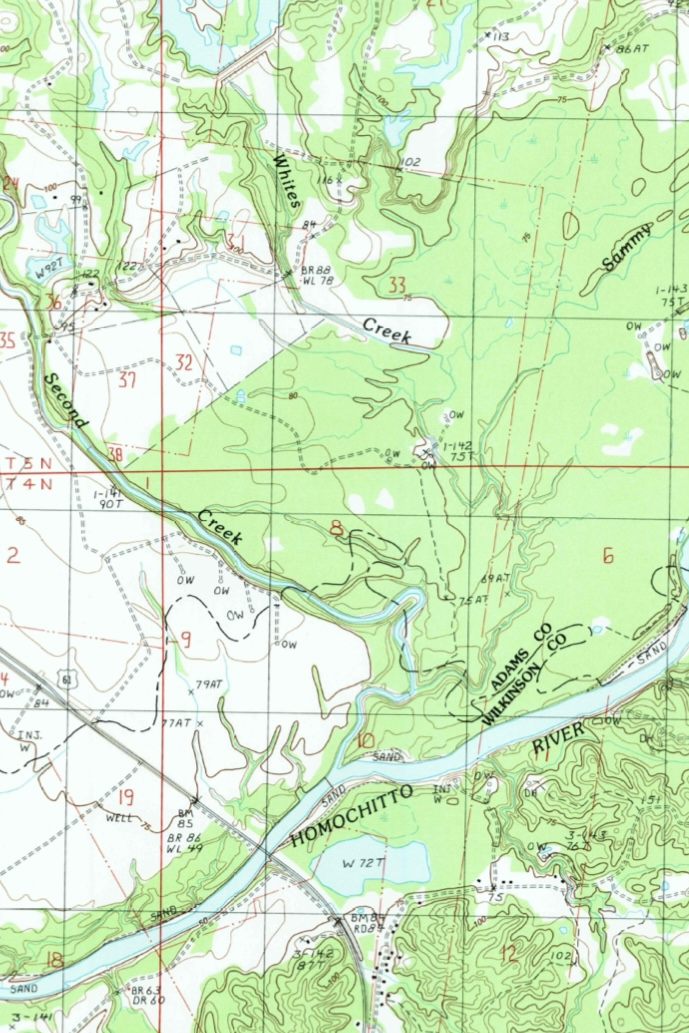
Confluence of Second Creek and Homochitto River mapped by USGS in 1988

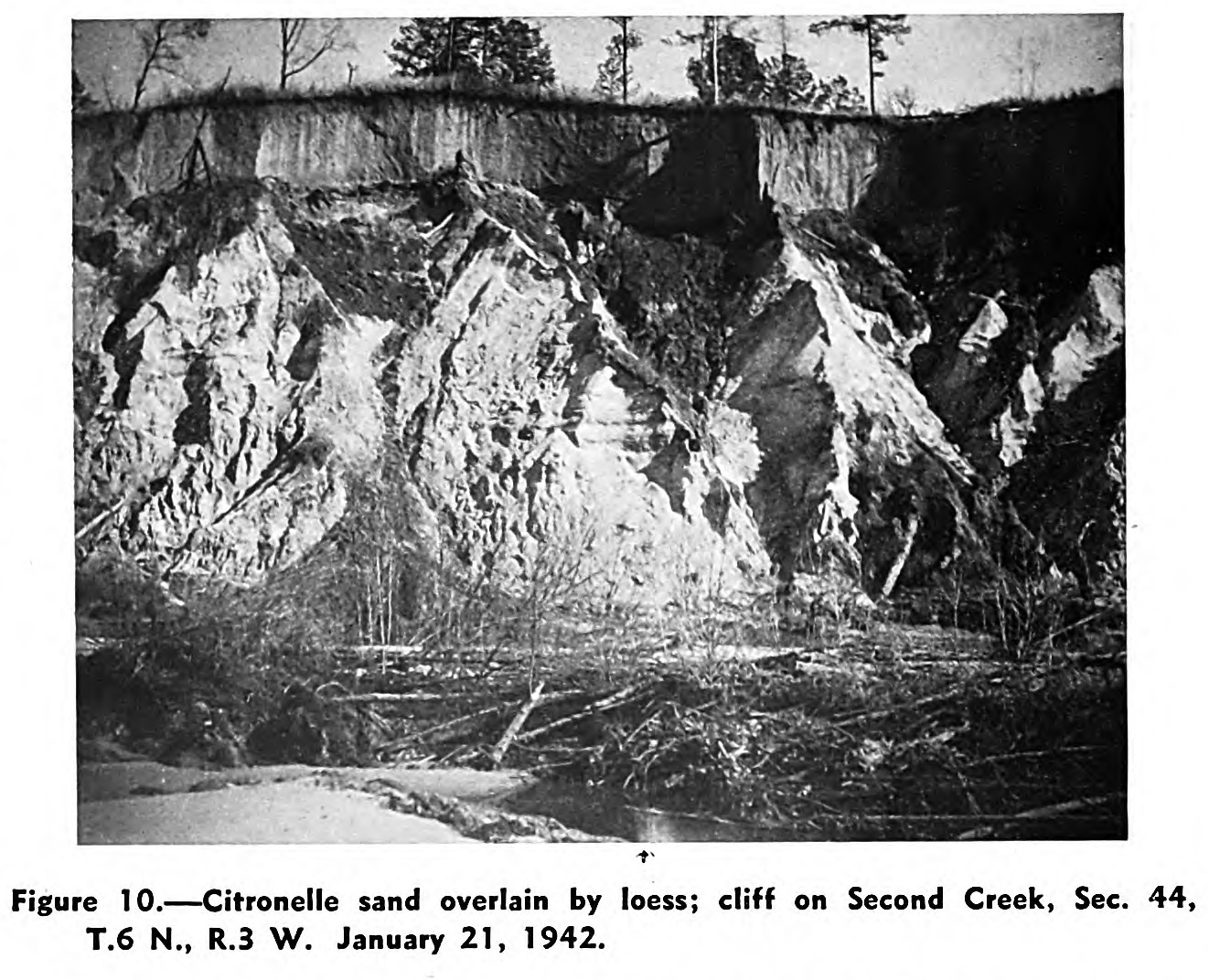
Second Creek, 1942

Second Creek is a waterway in the southern section of Adams County, Mississippi, United States. Second Creek is tributary to the Homochitto River. It enters the Homochitto near U.S. Route 61 bridge at Doloroso.

The Spanish explorer Hernando de Soto visited what is called White Apple Village, the settlement of Natchez chief Great Sun, along Second Creek, in approximately 1541. In the 1790s, pollution from the process of producing indigo dye killed many of the fish that lived in Second Creek. An attempted slave revolt, sometimes known as the Second Creek Slave Conspiracy, was suppressed in the vicinity of Second Creek in 1860.
