= Henry Chotard =

American plantation owner (1787–1870)

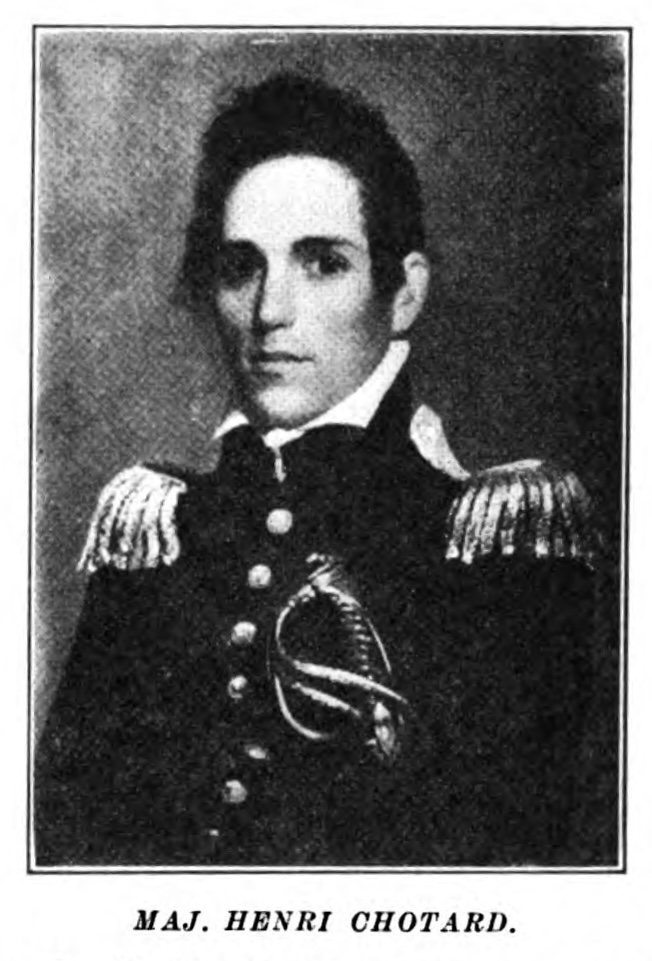
- This portrait hung at Landsdowne as of 1939
- Born: March 3, 1787; Saint-Domingue
- Died: July 7, 1870 (aged 83); Adams County, Mississippi, United States
- Occupations: Plantation owner, military officer

Henry Chotard (March 3, 1787 – July 7, 1870), often Maj. Chotard in print, was a 19th-century U.S. Army officer and plantation owner. He fought at the Battle of New Orleans in 1815 and remained closely aligned with Andrew Jackson for the rest of his life. Part of a circle of interrelated Natchez nabobs who lived in Adams County, Mississippi, Chotard owned mansions and plantations in Mississippi and Louisiana, and as of 1860, he enslaved 274 people.

== Chotards in Saint-Domingue, France, and Mississippi ==
Henry E. Chotard was the son of Jean Marie Chotard de la Place. Chotard was said to be a native of Saint-Domingue (now Haiti), from near Port-au-Prince, himself the son of a Frenchman from Brittany whose children had been educated at Nantes. Chotard was reportedly appointed to serve the colonial governor of Saint-Domingue (present-day Haiti) and married Jeanne Henriette Serafine Lafon. Mississippi historian Dunbar Rowland claimed she was "a daughter of Governor Lefont". A 20th-century genealogical compilation claimed that it was Chotard who was related to a governor of Saint-Domingue. Jean and Henriette had two children, Henry Chotard and Amenaïde Chotard. Chotard reportedly sent his children back to France for their education, and/or, upon the coming of the Haitian Revolution, he sent his wife and children back to France. Jean Marie Chotard de la Place had two sisters who lived on Saint-Domingue, Madame Cotin and Madame Barruct, and during the revolution they had "their husbands murdered in their own homes, their homes desolated and themselves plundered" and they had then escaped to Cuba.

Saint-Domingue at the beginning of the Haitian Revolution

During the voyage to France, Henriette and the children contracted smallpox. Henriette Lafon died at sea. The children landed in Bordeaux and were received and raised by a Monsieur Demeyure. Amenaïde Chotard married and lived out her days in France.

According to a daughter of his second marriage, "The disastrous results of the St. Domingo insurrection drove the refugees to different points. My father went to Philadelphia, Baltimore, Charleston, Savanah, Augusta and finally with many of his fellow sufferers, wandered to the interior, to the little town of Washington. There the French element was manifested in forming an agreeable society." Thus, Chotard de la Place was probably part of the first of three migrations of refugees from Saint-Domingue, the 1793 exodus to the East Coast of the United States. He married his second wife, Sarah Williams Willis, of Washington, Wilkes County, Georgia, around 1798.

Chotard was Williams' second husband; Sarah Williams "was a native of Greenville, S.C., and was married when very young to Col. Henry Willis of Virginia; was left a widow with two children when she was twenty years old, and was married to Mr. Chotard in Greenville, S. C." Sarah Williams was Henry Willis' second wife; his first wife had been Nancy Savage, and she was heir to property in Mississippi that the young couple were planning to claim when Wills caught "the stranger's disease" (yellow fever) in Charleston and died. In 1798, Chotard "returned to St. Domingo to see about his property, and to France to see his two children. He was gone sixteen months in fruitless efforts to recover some remuneration for his losses, but only realized the distressing fact that his pecuniary prospects were blighted, and that then at about 40 years of age, after a life of ease and luxury, he was thrown upon his own exertions, the obtaining of my mother's patrimony, and her portion of her first husband's estate, which lay mainly in the Mississippi territory."

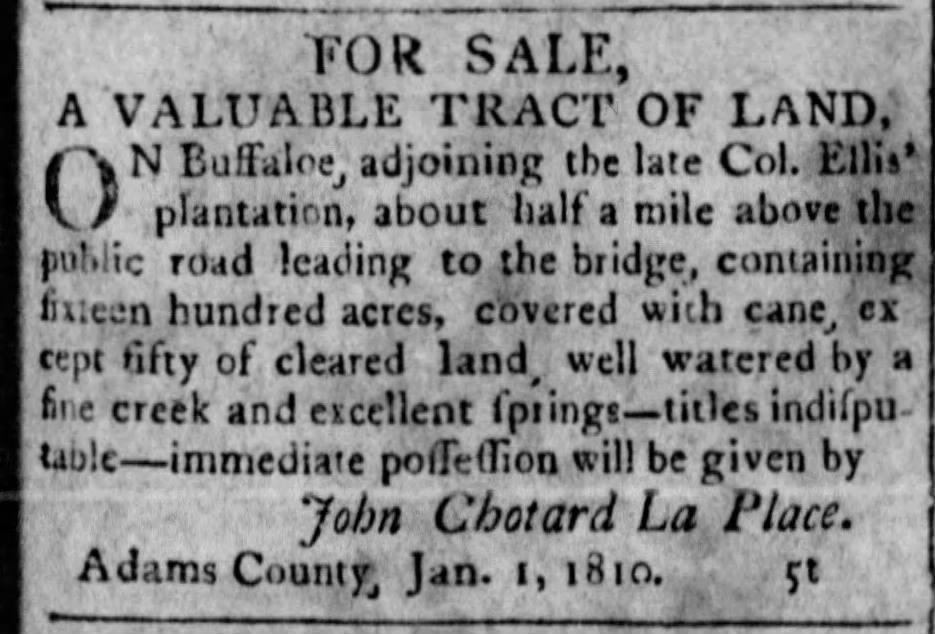
"FOR SALE by John Chotard La Place" The Weekly Chronicle, February 19, 1810

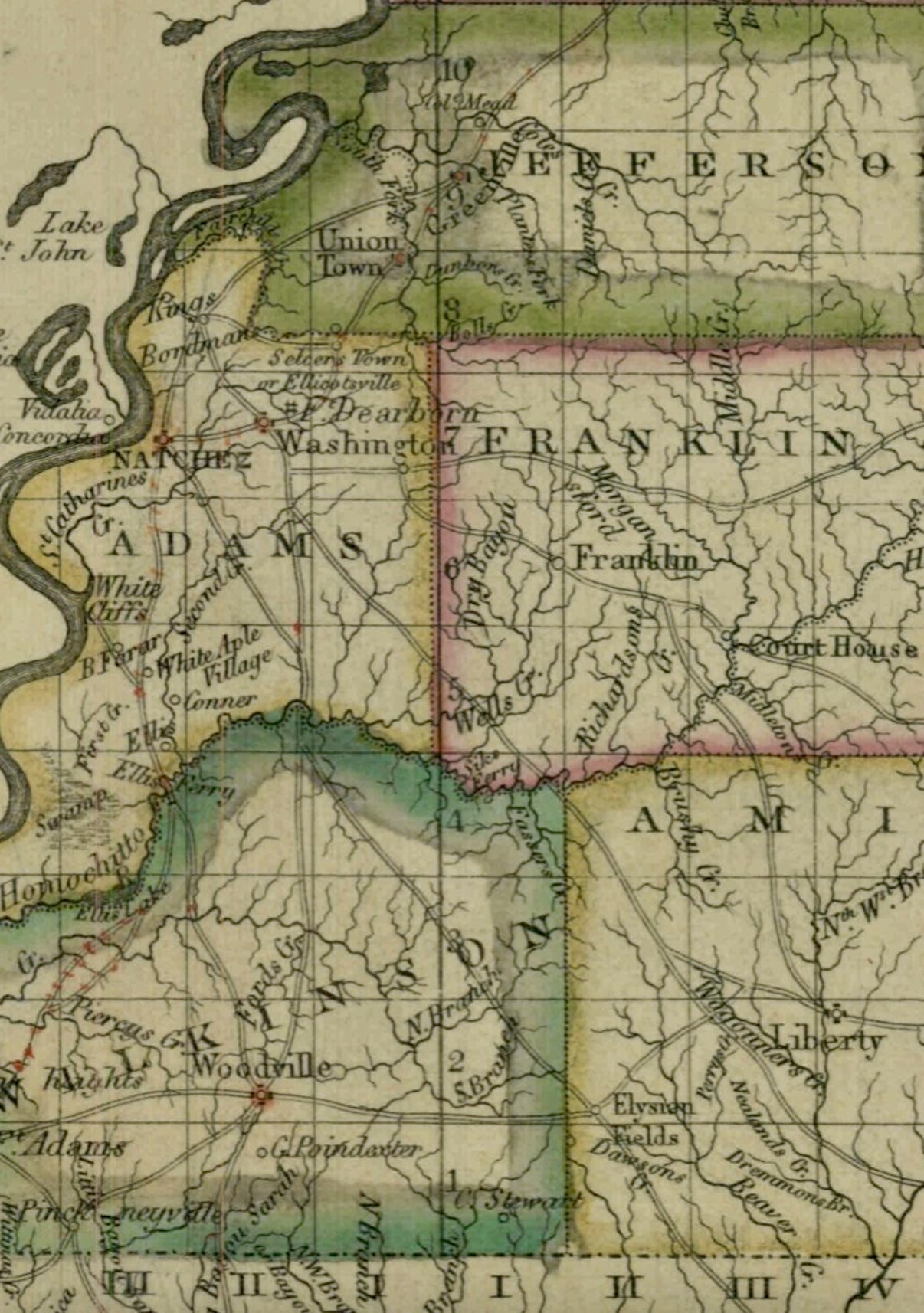
1819 map showing Liberty Road between Washington, the territorial capital in Adams County, and Liberty in Amite County

John Chotard de la Place settled in Adams County, Mississippi Territory around 1805. According to his daughter's autobiography, John and Sarah Chotard joined "John Turnbull of Charleston with two flat boats, taking his negroes to Walnut Hills, which he, his brother Frederick, and Mr. Gaillard owned and established as a cotton plantation." The children were sent to Mississippi in 1806 traveling by wagon "until we finally reached Marysville on the Tennessee River, where two flat boats were in readiness for us. One contained a large number of Negroes for Walnut Hills, the other was for the white family, including Mrs. Gaillard and a gentleman."

In 1809, the Spanish colonial government expelled the French-national refugees from Saint-Domingue, and the widowed Chotard sisters and at least one of their daughters obtained passage to New Orleans in a crowded vessel. They settled in Natchez around 1810 and opened a school. John Chotard "made a settlement on a plantation on the Liberty road" and lived there until his death on August 8, 1810. He had apparently "enjoyed fine health until 1810, when he got wet at Colonel Burling's funeral, at which he was a pall bearer. He came home sick with a violent headache and on the 8th of August died with brain fever."

== Early life ==
Henry Chotard spent his youth in France, and the French spelling of his name was Henri Chotard de la Place. According to his half-sister Eliza Williams Chotard, "at the proper age he was put in a military school, and remained until 16, when, by Napoleon's law, he would be obliged to enter the army, but my father being anti-Napoleon, ordered him to America." Henry Chotard arrived in the States around 1803. He came first to Charleston, and "did not understand a word of English and there was no one to speak French to him except my parents. His time, therefore, passed heavily."

== Military and militia career ==
He held rank as a second lieutenant in the United States Army in 1808, "appointed from the State of Georgia, Second Lieutenant in the Third Infantry." Zebulon Pike was his commanding officer for a time, and he served under Andrew Jackson during the Creek War and the Battle of New Orleans. When Jackson declared martial law in New Orleans and sent troops to arrest federal judge Dominick Hall for resisting him, "he was taken to the barracks and imprisoned in the same room with Louallier, and Maj. Chotard was sent to demand from the clerk of the United States court the treasonable document through which the judge had sought to interfere with Jackson's plans for the proper government of the camp. The clerk took the surprising view that this document was not treasonable, but a part of the records of the courts of the United States, and refused to allow it to go out of his possession. He declared that the commander of the army had no right to Interfere with court records, but finally he accompanied Maj. Chotard to Gen. Jackson, carrying the writ in his pocket."

Chotard's younger half-sister recounted her experience in New Orleans in January 1815 in her autobiography written 1868:

We were in the depth of affliction and in our distress Mother requested a gentleman to tell her stepson, Henry Chotard, who was on General Jackson's staff, to ride by our lodgings that we might bid him adieu (a last adieu, we thought) from the balcony. The General happened to hear our message and replied that he, with his suite, would call by to see us on his way to the battle ground. We, with many lady friends, assembled on the balcony, weeping as tho' the corpse of a beloved friend was to pass by. At last the cavalcade came in sight. We all wiped our eyes to take a last look, as we feared. When the salutations had passed, the General expressed his regret at our alarm insisting that we were in no danger, that the American arms would be victorious and the British whipped back to their ships. They were the most splendid horsemen I ever saw, dressed in full uniform, well mounted and caparisoned and as bright and gay as if going to a bridal ceremony. It was a rainy evening but the balcony was frequented with hope of hearing, but nothing was heard but the rain which fell more heavily. I have heard General Jackson say the fight that rainy night when it was difficult to distinguish friend from foe, decided our victory. We obtained a constant supply of provisions from the plantation, ten miles above and even had enough to give our neighbors but such was the state of our minds that we scarcely ever took an undisturbed meal, we were always running to the balcony to hear or see something. Our sleeping was as irregular as our eating, we never went regularly to bed. We all had pieces of gold concealed about our person, in case we would have to run, but, we asked each other, in what direction could we run? The river was in front and not a boat, the negroes were above and an insurrection was dreaded there, the swamp was back and impenetrable. Not a lady ventured on the street, even to see her dearest friends. The veteran corps cheered us all night by calling out the hour and saying "All's well." Thus our time was passed in constant dread. Christmas day had passed, however, and the British had not kept their promise to dine with us. The 1st of January 1815 at day break we heard the cannonading and were up and out, but the enemy failed to attack. That week was passed as anxiously as the previous ones but on the morning of the eighth the first gun awakened me, my pillow wet with tears I had shed in my dream that my brother was dead...We saw neither my brother nor uncle until after the 16th when the British had left. Then my brother made us a short call. His beard was long, not having been shaved since the siege began and in those days a long beard was a rare sight."

Following the battle of New Orleans Chotard was breveted rank to major for his service as an adjutant general to Andrew Jackson. In Jackson's official statement about the battle, he wrote, "All my officers in the line did their duty, and I have every reason to be satisfied, with the whole of my field and staff. Colonels Butler and Piatt and Maj. Chotard, by their intrepidity, saved the artillery." As of 1818 he was listed as a captain, brevet major, in the 1st Infantry commanded by Daniel Bissell. He resigned his Army commission on December 1, 1820.

Chotard joined the Natchez Fencibles militia company when it was organized in 1824 and "When Gen. Lafayette visited Natchez, in 1826, the Fencibles were his special escort, also when one of Napoleon's favorite officers Count Bertrand, came to Natchez as the guest of Charles Lacoste, Emile Profilet, Doctor Chappela, Maj. Henry Chotard and others. The Fencibles as escort, in their beautiful French blue uniforms, trimmed with silver lace, silver marble buttons, were the pride of their fellow-citizens and the admiration of the ladies."

In 1840, when an aging and ill Andrew Jackson traveled to New Orleans for the 25th anniversary of the battle, Chotard was one of the sponsors of a ball that was held in his honor in Natchez.

Some 40 years after the battle of New Orleans, Chotard was called upon for fact-checking an argument about whether or not Jackson's militiamen fired at the British from behind cotton bales. Chotard responded the inquiry with a letter that was republished in Southern papers:

I have received your note of the 21st inst. regret that indisposition has prevented me from replying sooner to your inquiries relative to two errors made, you say, in four recent histories of the United States. I was Gen. Jackson's Assistant Adjutant General, and not his Aid, as you suppose, and am, consequently, able to answer questions.

To your first, I say that the schooner Carolina was the only vessel engaged on the evening of the 23d of December, and under the immediate command of Commodore Patterson, she dropped down the river, opposite the British camp, with instructions to commence the attack, which was also the signal of the advance of the troops.

To your second inquiry, I say we had no breastwork erected with cotton bales. We only used them to form the embrasures of our batteries, and that only in one or two of these were they displaced from their position, and not set fire to by the British batteries opposite. Believe me, respectfully, H. CHOTARD

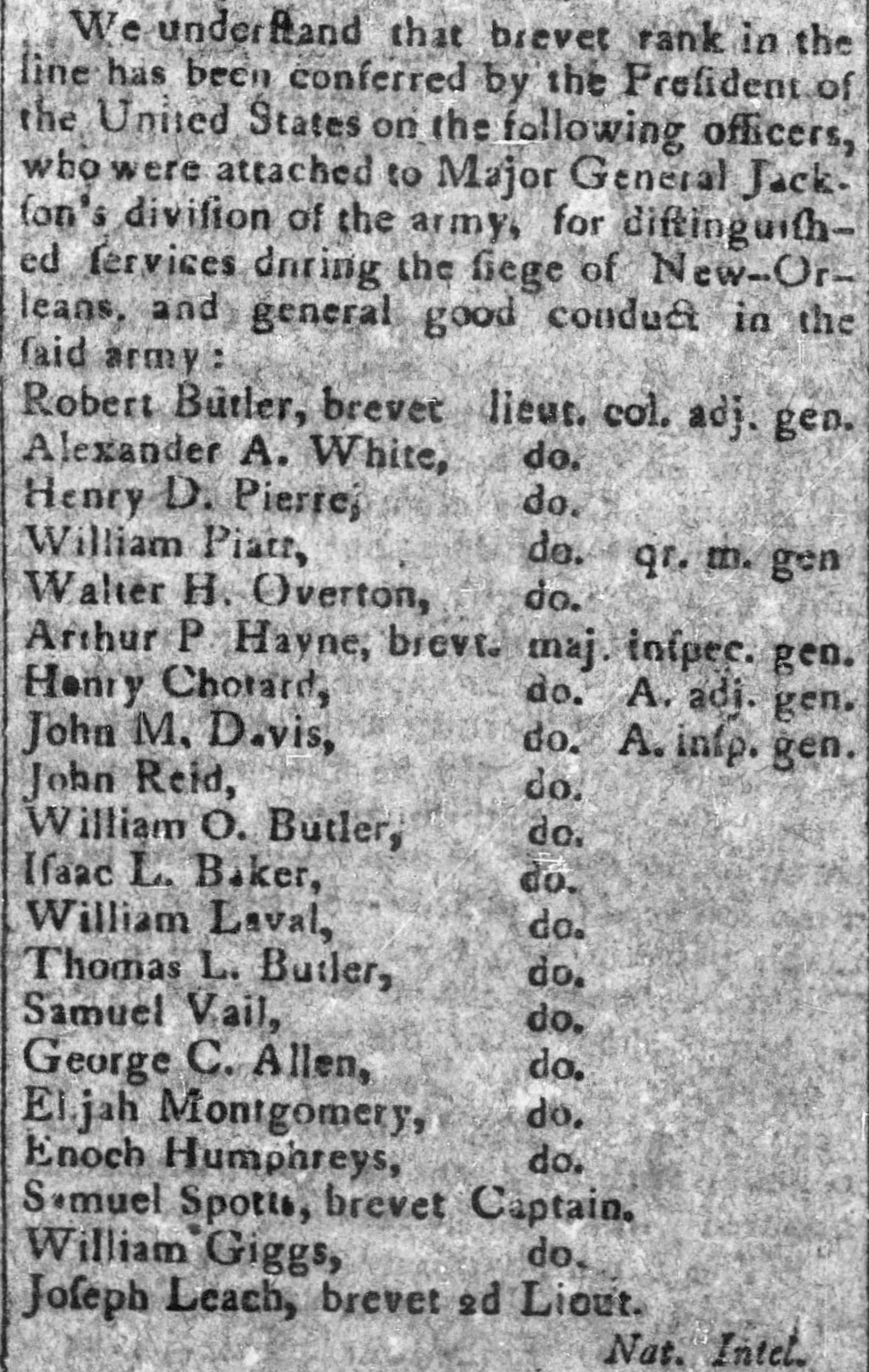
Chotard was one of several Jackson aides breveted rank after the Battle of New Orleans, along with Overton, Hayne, and cousins Robert, William O., and Thomas L. Butler

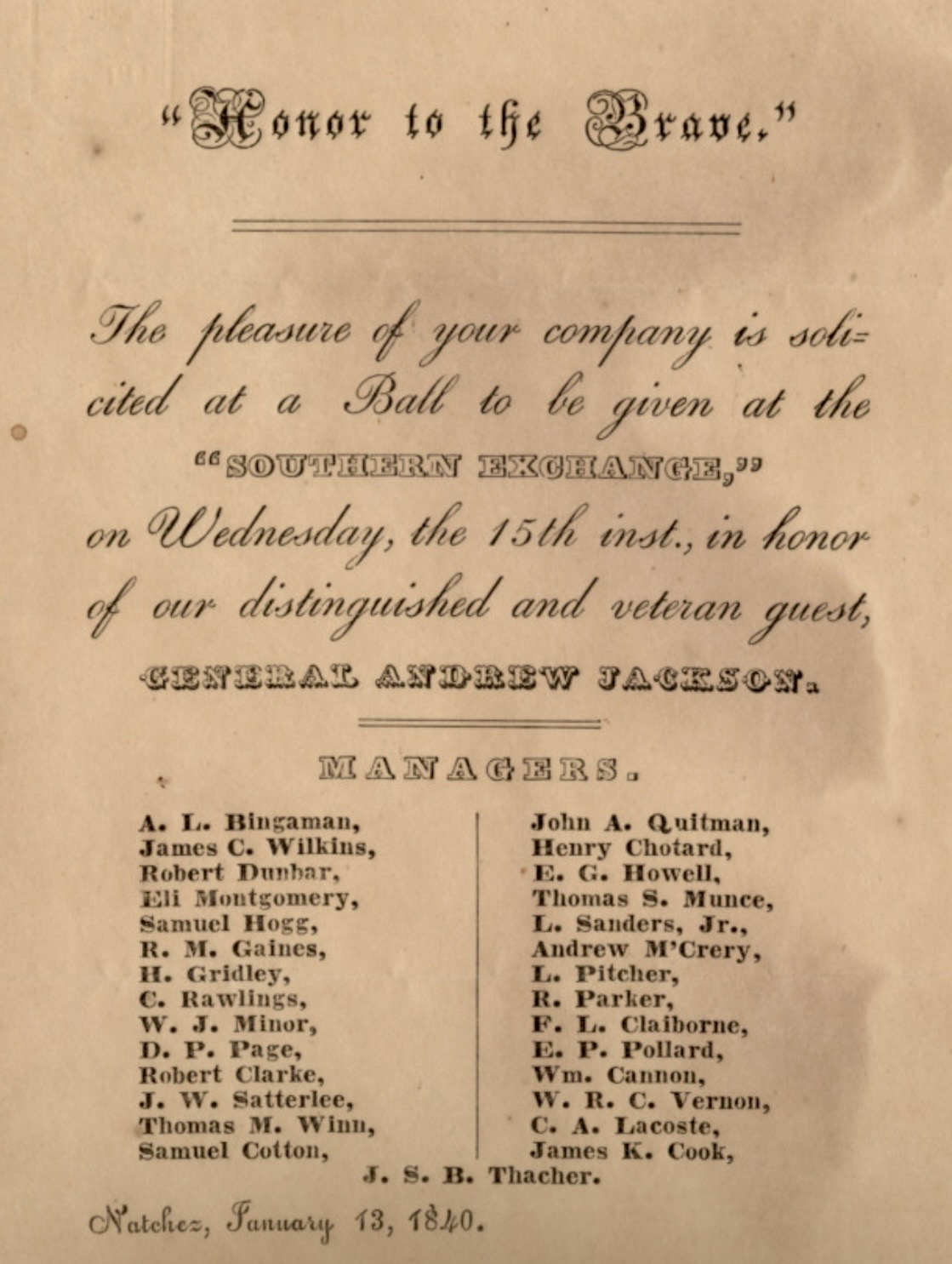
Invitation to 1840 ball in Natchez, honoring Andrew Jackson on the 25th anniversary of the battle, consponsored by Chotard, A. L. Bingaman, James C. Wilkins, Samuel Hogg, R. M. Gaines, William J. Minor, John A. Quitman, and J. S. B. Thacher (Historic New Orleans Collection)

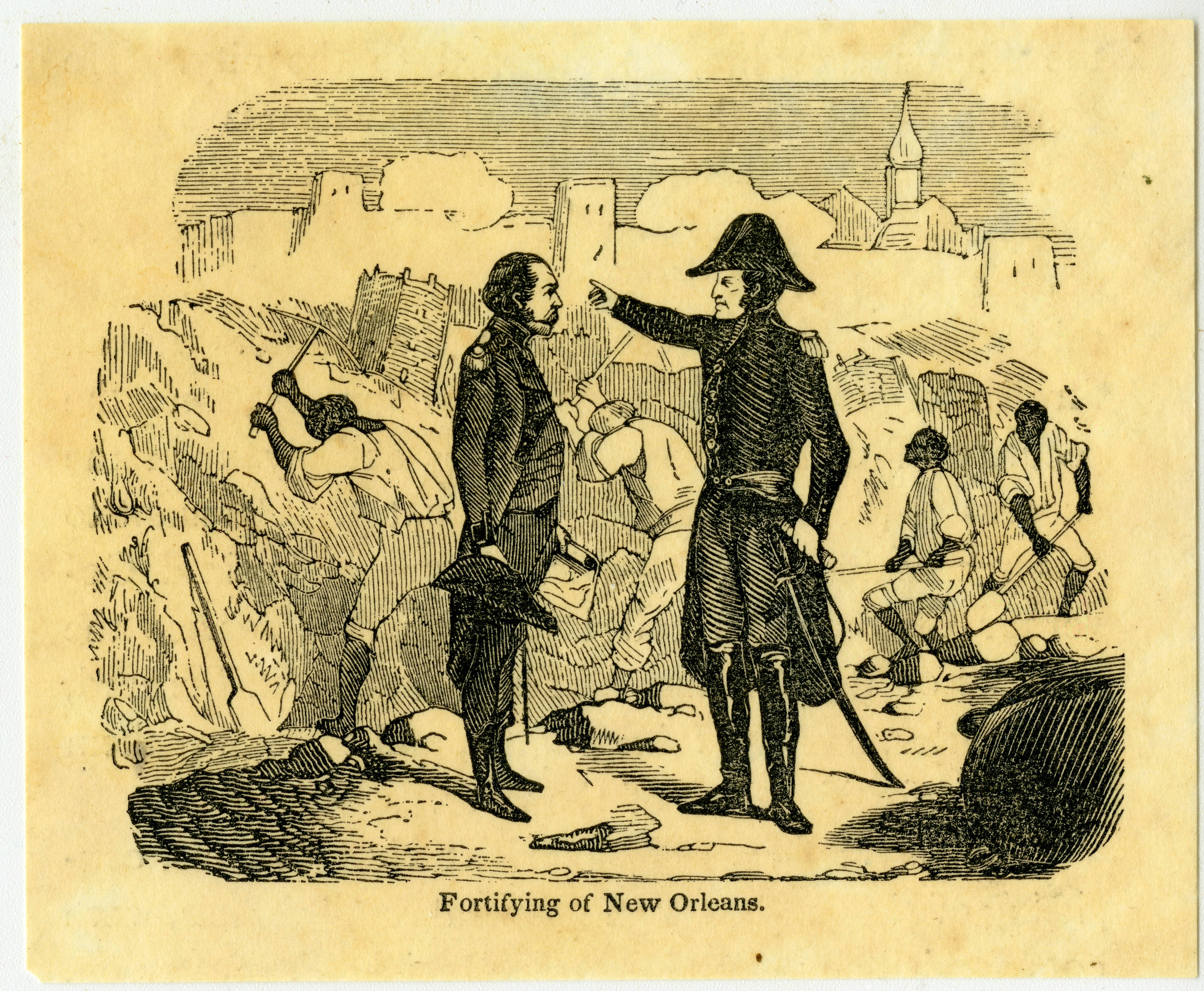
500+ slaves were impressed by Jackson to build defenses around the city of New Orleans (Croome, 1848)

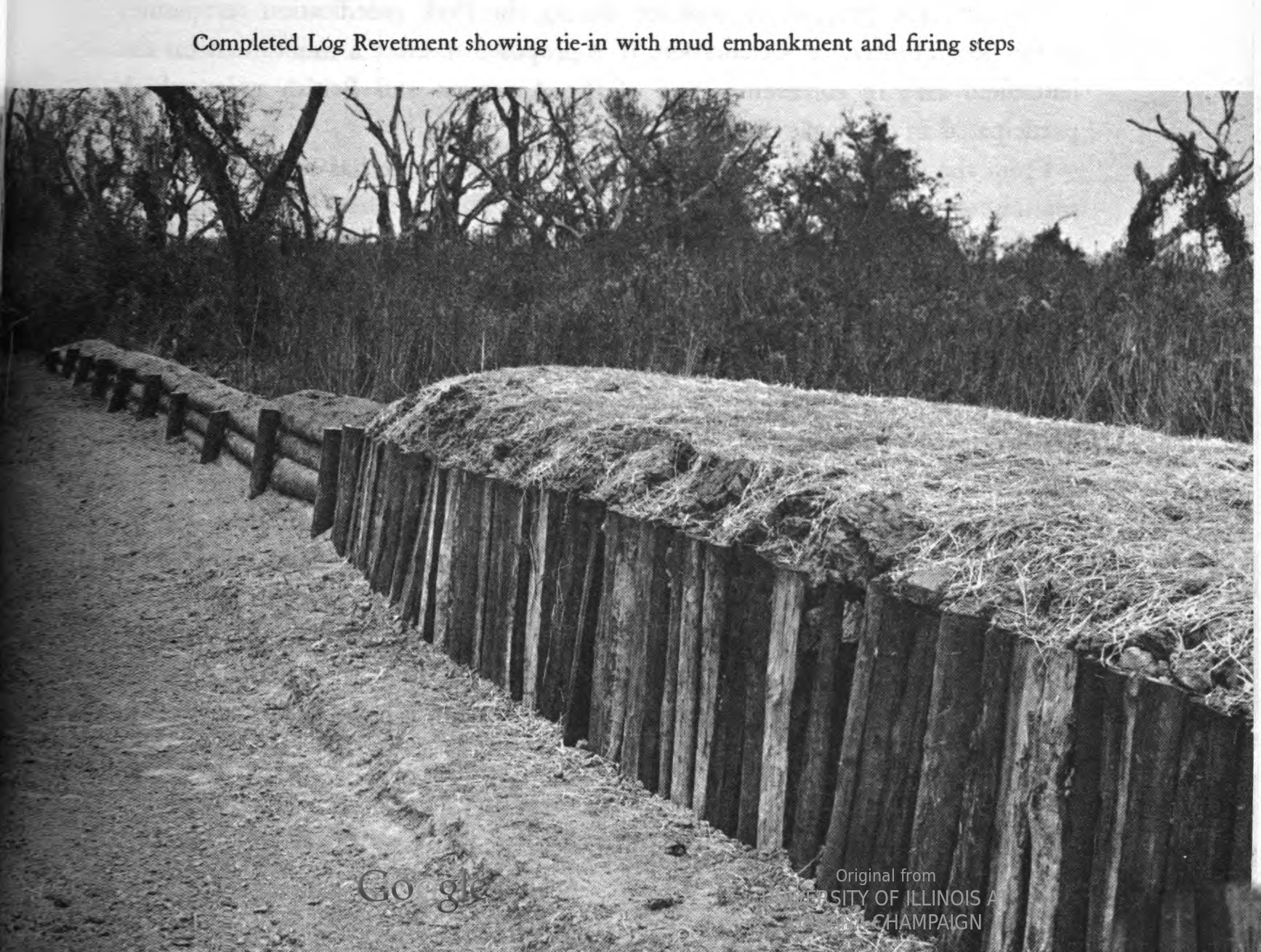
Replica log revetments build for the 1965 sesquicentennial of the battle of New Orleans

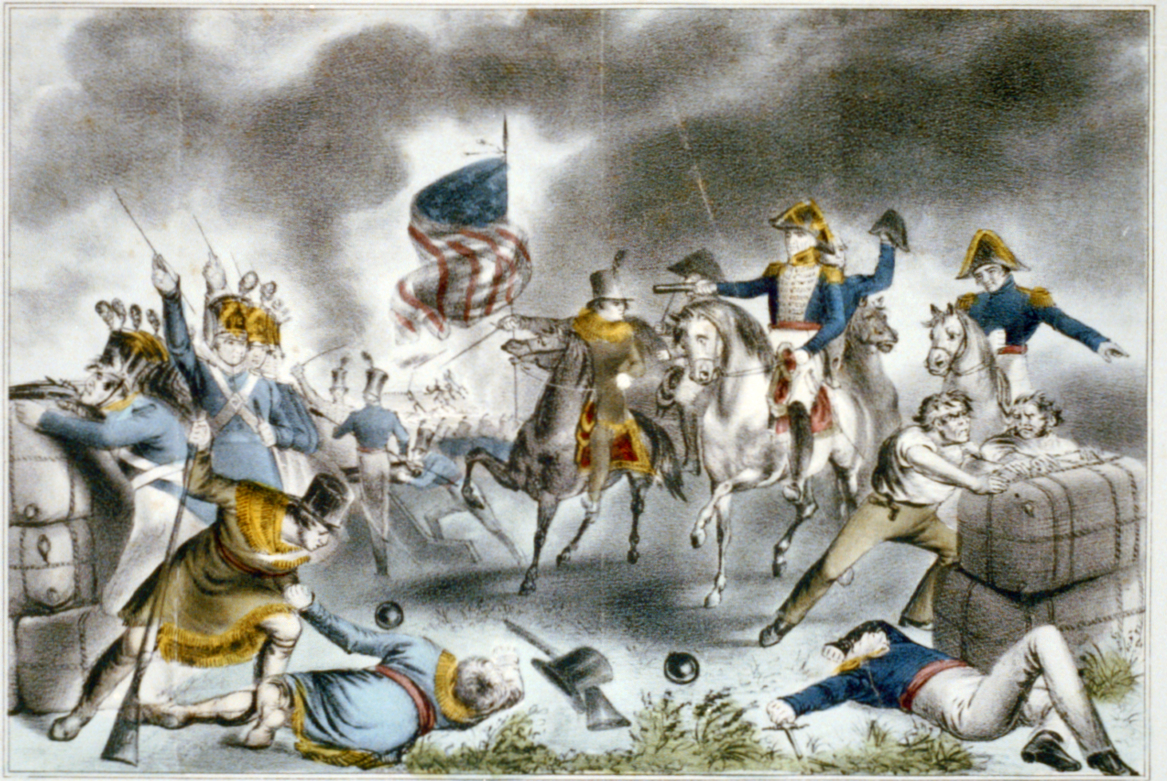
Late 19th-century printmakers, including Currier & Ives, frequently depicted frontiersmen firing from behind cotton bales at the Battle of New Orleans

== Business and planting interests ==
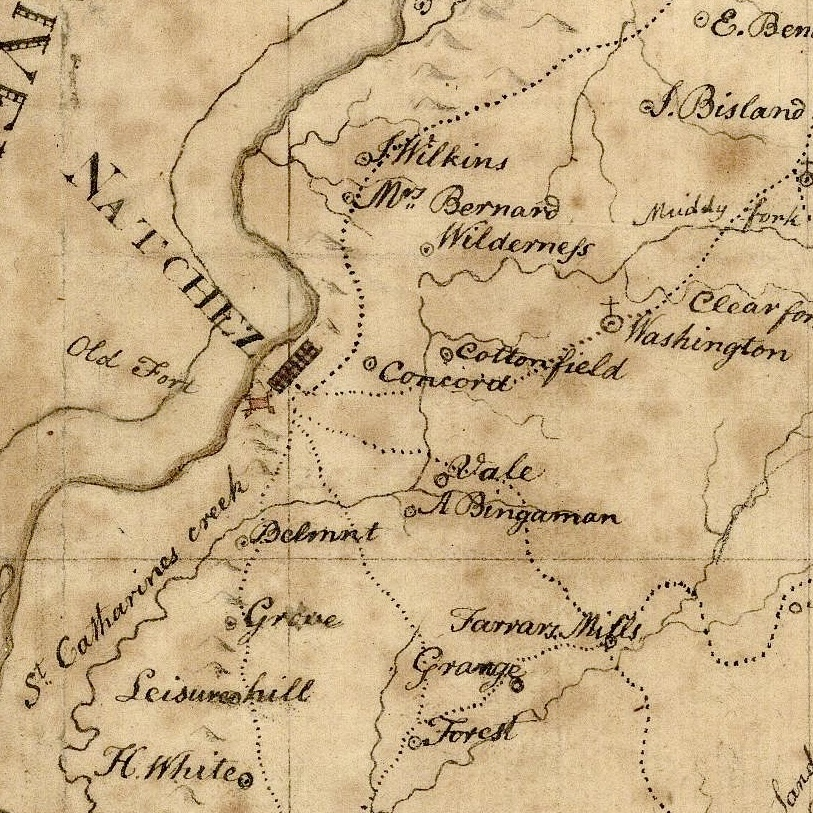
Detail of 1802 survey of the Natchez District showing locations of Concord and Cottonfield

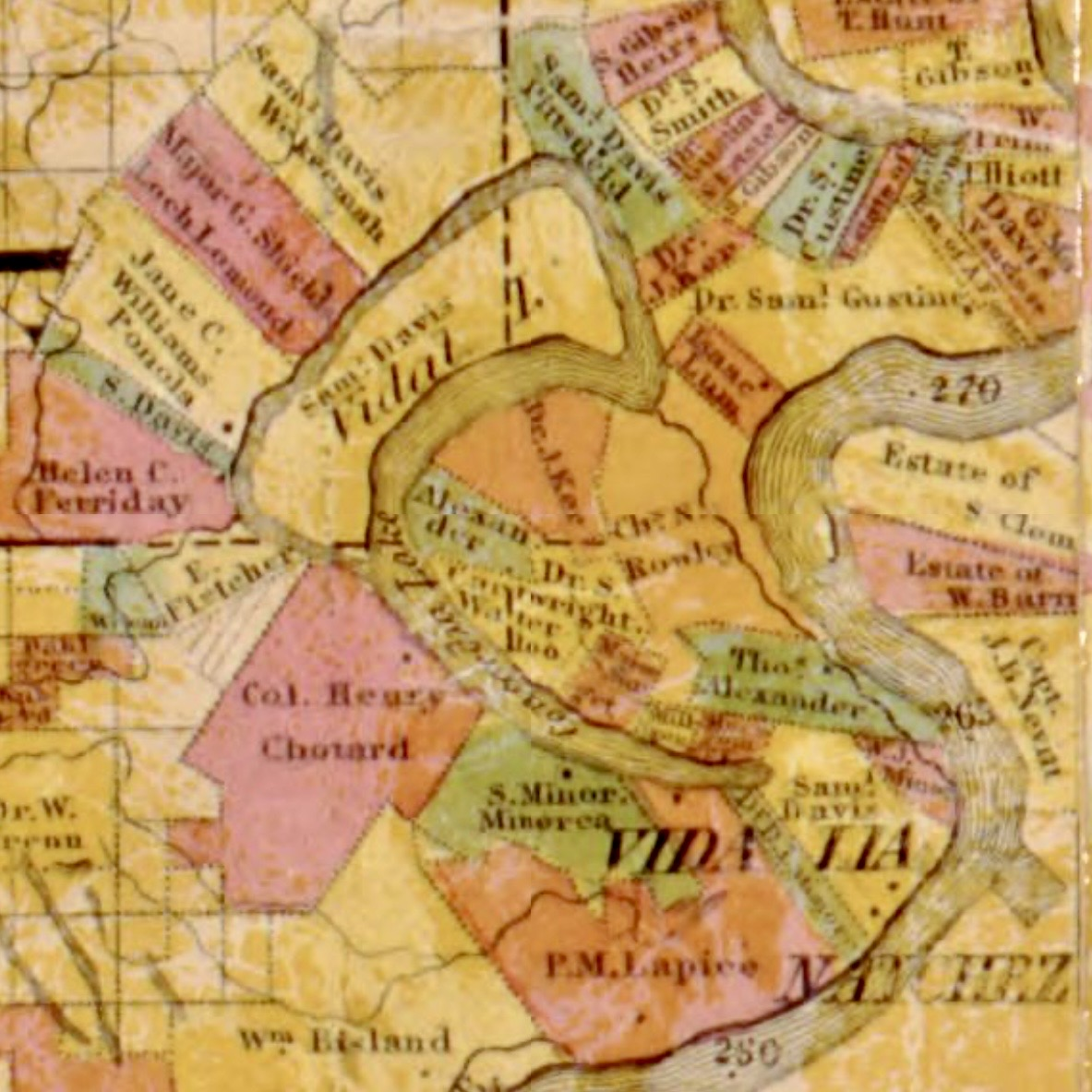
Plantations in vicinity of Vidalia, Louisiana in 1853, including property of Chotard's along Concordia Lake

- Somerset: Chotard settled at Somerset in 1821. Somerset was first established as a plantation by a man named William Vousden (or Vousdan) under the name of Cotton Fields, at the crossing of St. Catherine's Creek on the road between Natchez and Washington. Vousdan had been married to Elizabeth Marie Celeste Hutchins, a daughter of pioneer settler Anthony Hutchins. The name was changed to Somerset perhaps by the second owner George Lloyd, who in short order sold it to his neighbor Stephen Minor. Chotard bought it in 1828 from Minor's executors for the price of $25,000. The house was described in 1935 as "an old house when it first came into the possession of the Chotards...a long, slender building with a brick basement and enormous upper and lower galleries supported by the slender, rounded pillars usually associated with Spanish architecture. It was put together with mathematical precision, each piece being sawed to fit and held together with wooden pins. The high ceilings contradicted the Spanish pillars and the entrance with its overhead light pointed to provincial or early American type, evolved by necessity. The galleries were probably 90 feet long and 18 feet wide and quaint hand-made bannisters with slender slats enclosed them. It stood on a green knoll with the grounds sloping in all directions. A drive wound through these grounds where ancient oaks were draped in long gray veils of Spanish moss and huge myrtles interspersed the green shade with branches bearing lacey pirk blossoms. Luxuriant vines shaded the lower gallery and exotic potted plants, ferns and easy chairs and benches gave it the appearance of a conservatory." Chotard heirs through the Chaplain line sold Somerset to F. C. Chaffin in 1917 for $30,000. Chaffin demolished the original house. The original outbuildings, including a detached kitchen, former slave quarters, a greenhouse, and a "quaint little smokehouse" were all extant as of 1935. According to a 1915 newspaper feature on historic houses of the Natchez District, Somerset house was a "queenly, constructed-frame building situated in the midst of 700 acres of well-timbered land, with quaint gardens and greenhouses abounding in beautiful flowers. Its furnishings were brought from France, the vast drawing room suggesting a typical French salon, with its fine brocaded rosewood furniture, mirrors and many objects d'art. The walls were hung with beautiful portraits from the brush of Gilbert Stuart, Thomas Sully, and Benjamin West. This home was occupied by the Chotard family for 90 years."
- Sycamore: At one time, he owned Sycamore Plantation in Concordia Parish, Louisiana, across the river from Natchez. In 1858 there were reports of an outbreak of scarlet fever at Chotard's Concordia plantation. Before the American Civil War, Minor's holdings near Vidalia were accessible by what was known as Trinity Road.
- Minorca: In 1860 his Concordia parish plantation was called Minorca, and A. V. Davis owned the neighboring Sycamore. Minorca plantation was owned by Chotard, and remained in the Chotard family until at least 1889. As of 1882, the Alfred V. Davis place was called Taconey. At that time, Minorca was said to be 1,500 acres, and Sycamore was 5,000 acres, and the area was still considered excellent cotton land.
- Oakland: Oakland house in suburban Natchez was built on land that had been owned by Stephen Minor, who then sold it to his son-in-law Henry Chotard. When Henry Chotard's daughter Catherine Chotard married Horatio Eustis, they commissioned the Oakland mansion in 1838. It then passed back to the Minors in 1858, and as of 1939, was home to "portraits of the Minors, the Surgets, the Chotards, and most famous of all, that of the gay American Don, Major Estevan Minor, dressed in the scarlet and gold of his regimental uniform...Also at Oakland are the paintings of the great horses of the Minor, Bingaman and Surget stables, proud aristocrats of the turf who carried their owners' colors to victory on the old Pharsalia track and in the distant racing courses of the East."
- Slave ownership: In 1822 his agents advertised a $20 reward for the return of an enslaved man named Harry, legally owned by Chotard after being recently purchased from Isaac Franklin. In 1830 he owned 24 slaves in Adams County. At the time of the 1850 U.S. census he owned 99 enslaved people in Adams County, Mississippi. At the time of the 1860 census, he owned 34 slaves in Adams County, 154 slaves in Concordia Parish, and another 86 in Issaquena County, making Chotard one of the South's elite slaveholders and one of the top 50 enslavers resident in Mississippi.
- In 1853 he was party to what was described as "an interesting fugitive slave case" in Cincinnati. According to a widely distributed newspaper account, "Abolitionists are noted for their philanthrophy, especially that sort philanthrophy which indulges in negro stealing and attempts to entice slaves from their masters. An illustrative case recently occurred in Cincinnati. It appears a wealthy planter, Major Chotard, of Louisiana, was passing through that city and had with him two negro women, both slaves. The abolitionists got wind of the fact, sued out a writ of habeas corpus for the two women, and made it returnable immediately before Judge Stallo. The proceedings are related by the Commercial as follows: The slaves were at the Burnet House, and were brought into the Court attended by their master, friends, and a number of persons, attracted by singular spectacle of a controversy as to whether two persons belonged to themselves or to some third party. Arrived in Court, the first question as to the real wishes of the slaves, whether wished to be free or return to the South. At suggestion of Mr. Jolie all persons withdrew the Courtroom except the judge, the sheriff, the two slave women, that it might be understood whether they desired the freedom virtually given them by their master when be voluntarily brought them to a free State. When the parties returned into Court, Judge Stallo informed Maj. Chotard that his slaves were willing to return to his service." After war, Chotard was listed as one of four owners of Freedmen's schools operating in Concordia Parish in 1868.
- Banking interests: In 1832, he was elected one of the directors of the Bank of the United States branch in Natchez, cashier, Levin R. Marshall, president of the board, James C. Wilkins, fellow directors: Henry W. Vick, William Shipp, Thomas G. Ellis, Alvarez Fisk, Richmond Bledsoe, William Ferriday, John Routh, John Baynton, John P. Walworth, Gustavus Colhoun Jr., and John A. Quitman. Chotard, John McMurran, and Aylette Buckner were among the directors of the Commercial Bank of Natchez, whose president was Levin R. Marshall. In 1858 the pallbearers for Quitman were Chotard, Adam L. Bingaman, J. B. Nevitt, W. J. Minor, Wm. P. Mellen, C. G. Dahlgren, Mr. Gab. Shields, and Aylette Buckner.
- Railroads: In 1834 he was part of a committee of businessmen who sought to build a railroad to Natchez. As of 1869, he was only one of the men who was still living in the vicinity of Natchez.

== Personal life ==
Chotard was considered a Natchez nabob, in part because of his family ties. According to historian Clayton James, "The town nabobery consisted of about forty families whose men were prominent in agricultural, professional, and commercial vocations...One such clan included the closely related Surget, White, Wilkins, Bingaman, Lintot, Minor, Vousdan, and Chotard family, each of which held title to vast cotton domains." Chotard was a Roman Catholic and supported efforts to establish a local diocese in the 1820s. Marie Chotard, Chotard's 20-years-younger half-sister by his father's second wife, married Mississippi banker and planter-baron Levin R. Marshall. Marie Chotard Marshall died in 1833, most likely in the cholera epidemic of that year. A cousin, Amanaide Marie Ducayet Simms, died in New Orleans in 1917.

Henry Chotard commissioned a portrait of his three young sons from the artist Joseph Henry Bush. According to art historian Estill Curtis Pennington, Bush's "best work in Natchez was accomplished after 1830, when he painted such works as the Chotard boys. His unique compositional device of stacking three figures in an interdependent manner on the picture plane separates him from his more federalist fellow Kentuckians."

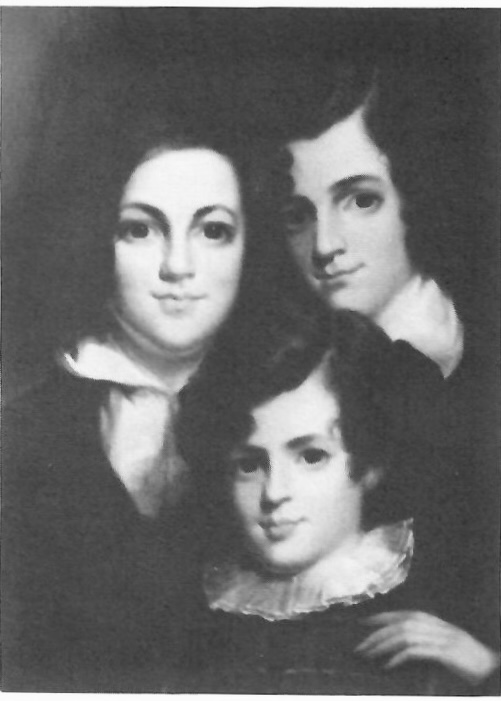
The Chotard brothers, Richard DeMeyere Chotard, John Charles Chotard, and Henry Chotard Jr., painted c. 1838, attributed to Kentuckian Joseph Henry Bush

Chotard married Frances Minor, daughter of Stephen Minor, May 27, 1819, in Natchez. The ceremony was performed by Edward Turner.

- Catherine Chotard m. Henry Sprauge Eustis, Harvard-educated planter and lawyer; two of their sons joined the Confederate Army and were killed in the American Civil War; another son married a Percy of Adams County
- Amenaide Chotard m. Edward K. Chaplain
- Frances "Fanny" Chotard, "a great beauty and belle in her youth," never married
- Richard De Meyere Chotard
- Henry Chotard Jr. (1827–1895)
- Henrietta Chotard, never married
- John Charles Chotard, Confederate soldier, found dead below a broken third-floor hotel window in Selma, Alabama in November 1864
- William Minor Chotard, died in infancy
- Maria Marshall Chotard m. Farar B. Conner, grandson of territorial speaker William Conner

== Death and legacy ==
His health declined precipitously in 1870 and he died at Somerset, and was buried in the family cemetery.

Varina Howell Davis, wife of Mississippi politician Jefferson Davis, mentioned Chotard in passing in her memoirs as "an elegant man, a refugee from St. Domingo, who illustrated most manly charms and virtues in his own person." At the time of his death he was described him as a "strong, ardent, patriotic Southernor, [who] sent forth to battle during the late war five of his sons and grandsons, two of whom, Horatio and Richard Eustis, fell at their posts whilst nobly discharging their duty." Another newspaper obituary stated, "As a genial, chivalrous gentleman he had no superior; he was warmly beloved by a host of friends, and leaves a large family to mourn his loss."

== Sources ==
- Biographical and Historical Memoirs of Mississippi: Embracing an Authentic and Comprehensive Account of the Chief Events In the History of the State and a Record of the Lives of Many of the Most Worthy and Illustrious Families and Individuals. Chicago: The Goodspeed Publishing Co. 1891. LCCN 03019139. OCLC 808043. OL 16816499W. FHL Catalog 152233 – via HathiTrust.
- Eustis, Henry Lawrence (1878). Genealogy of the Eustis family. Boston: David Clapp & Son. OCLC 7908034 – via Harvard University Libraries, Google Books & HathiTrust. "Originally published in the New-England Historical and Genealogical Register for April, 1878."
- Gould, Elizabeth Williams Chotard (September 1936). Ray, Worth S. (ed.). "The Diary of Eliza Chotard". Southern Historical Research Magazine. Vol. 1, no. 4. Dallas, Texas: n.pub. pp. 335–338. OCLC 5266118 – via Internet Archive.
- ——— (February 1937). ——— (ed.). "The Autobiography of Elizabeth Williams Chotard Gould". Southern Historical Research Magazine. Vol. 2, no. 1. Dallas, Texas: n.pub. pp. 31–44. OCLC 5266118.
- Greene, Jerome (2010). "The New Orleans Campaign of 1814–1815 and the Chalmette Battlefield". In Birkedal, Ted (ed.). Search for the Lost Riverfront: Historical and Archeological Investigations at the Chalmette Battlefield, Jean Lafitte National Historical Park and Preserve. U.S. National Park Service. LCCN 2010443479. OCLC 1014291708. This article incorporates text from this source, which is in the public domain.
- James, D. Clayton (1993) [1968]. Antebellum Natchez. Baton Rouge, Louisiana: Louisiana State University Press. ISBN 978-0-8071-1860-3. LCCN 68028496. OCLC 28281641.
- Lachance, Paul F. (Spring 1988). "The 1809 Immigration of Saint-Domingue Refugees to New Orleans: Reception, Integration and Impact". Louisiana History: The Journal of the Louisiana Historical Association. 29 (2): 109–141. ISSN 0024-6816. JSTOR 4232650.
- Marshall, Theodora Britton; Evans, Gladys Crail (1939). They found it in Natchez. New Orleans: Pelican Pub. Co. LCCN 40001950. OCLC 536767.
- McBee, May Wilson (1953). The Natchez Court Records, 1767–1805: Abstracts of Early Records. Ann Arbor, Michigan: Edwards Brothers, Inc. – via Internet Archive, digitized from a copy held at the Allen County Public Library Genealogy Center in Fort Wayne, Indiana.
- Murray, Elizabeth Dunbar (1938). Early Romances of Historic Natchez. Natchez, Mississippi: Natchez Printing & Stationery Co. OCLC 5463608.
- Owen, Thomas McAdory; Owen, Marie Bankhead (1921). History of Alabama and Dictionary of Alabama Biography. Vol. III. Chicago: The S. J. Clarke Pub Co. LCCN 21018194. OCLC 1872130.
- Pennington, Estill Curtis (1989). "Aesthetics of Everyday Life in Old Natchez". In Polk, Noel (ed.). Natchez Before 1830. The L.O. Crosby Jr. Memorial Lectures in Mississippi Culture. Jackson: University Press of Mississippi. pp. 109–123. ISBN 978-0-87805-380-3. LCCN 88028046. OCLC 18739746.
- Peoples, Morgan (Winter 1985). "Military Actions of North Louisianaians from Statehood Through the Mexican War, 1812–1848". North Louisiana Historical Association Journal. 16 (1): 35–43.
- Power, Steve (1897). The memento, old and new Natchez, 1700 to 1897. Natchez, Miss.: Myrtle Bank Publishers. LCCN 84061565. OCLC 2920774.
- Rothstein, Morton (1979). "The Changing Social Networks and Investment Behavior of a Slaveholding Elite in the Ante Bellum South: Some Natchez Nabobs, 1800–1860". In Greenfield, Sidney M.; Strickon, Arnold; Aubey, Robert T. (eds.). Entrepreneurs in Cultural Context. School of American Research, Advanced Seminar Series. Albuquerque: University of New Mexico Press. pp. 65–88. ISBN 978-0-8263-0504-6. LCCN 78021433. OCLC 4859059.
- Rowland, Dunbar (1907). Encyclopedia of Mississippi History: Comprising Sketches of Counties, Towns, Events, Institutions and Persons. Madison, Wisconsin: Selwyn A. Brant. OCLC 2962445.
- Virkus, Frederick Adams, ed. (December 1928). The Abridged Compendium of American Genealogy: First Families of America. A Genealogical Encyclopedia of the United States. Vol. III. Chicago: F.A. Virkus & Company.
