= Oakland (Natchez) =

Historic house in Mississippi, United States

- U.S. National Register of Historic Places
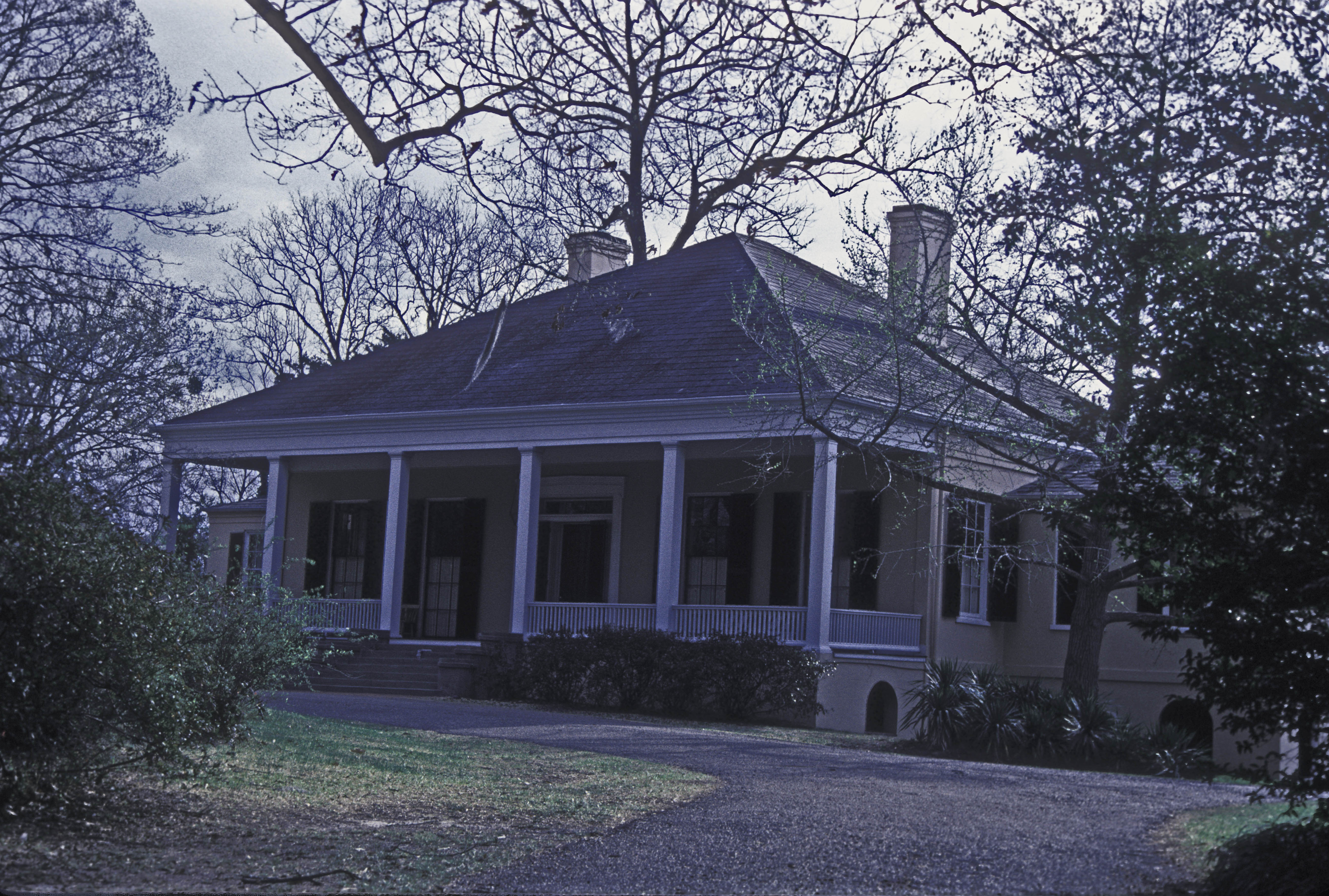

- Location within Mississippi Location within the United States
- Location: 9 Oakhurst Dr., Natchez, Mississippi
- Coordinates: 31°33′0″N 91°22′30″W
- Area: 3.5 acres (1.4 ha)
- Built: 1841
- Architectural style: Greek Revival
- NRHP reference No.: 76001087
- Added to NRHP: October 21, 1976

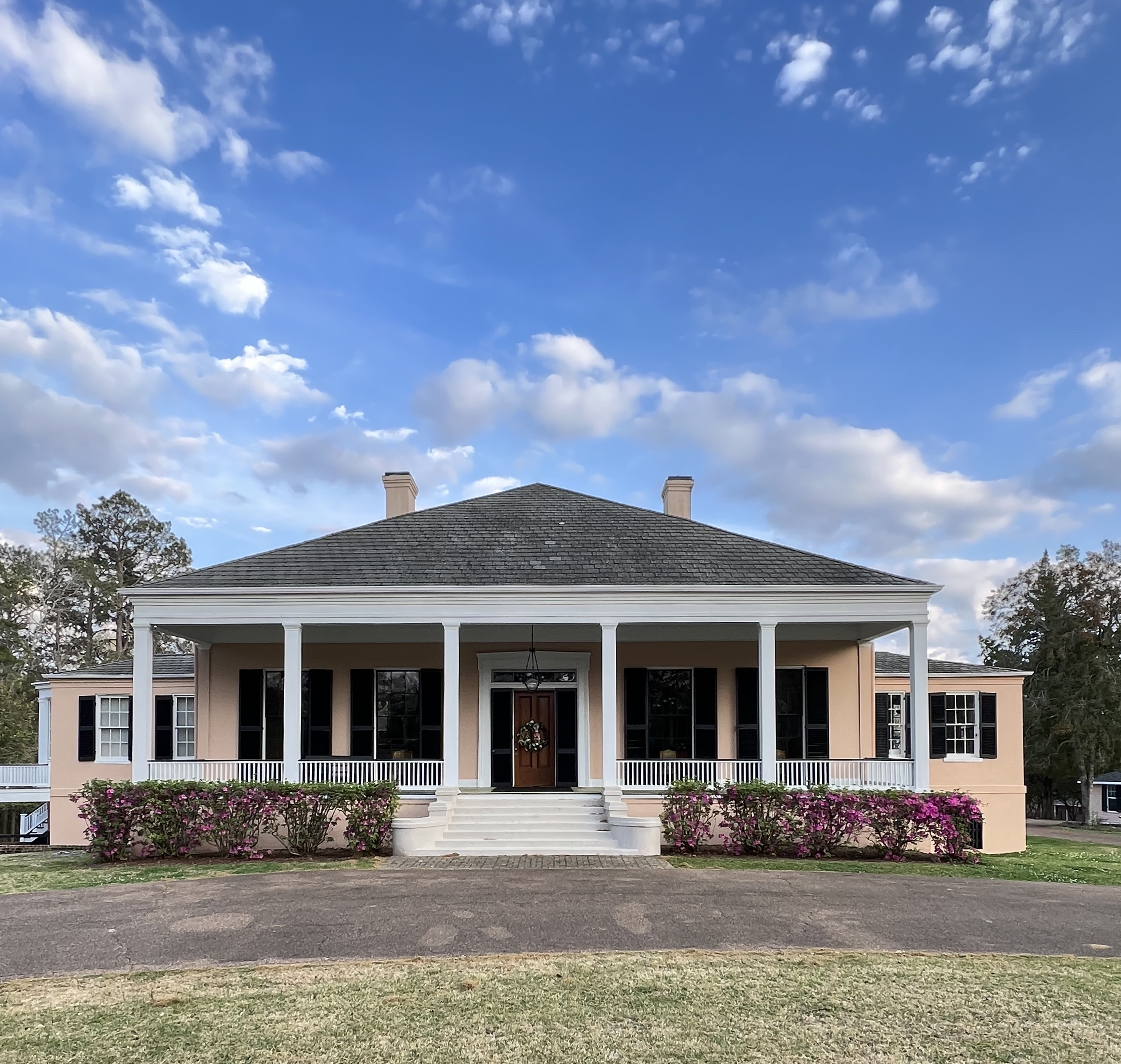
Oakland 2025

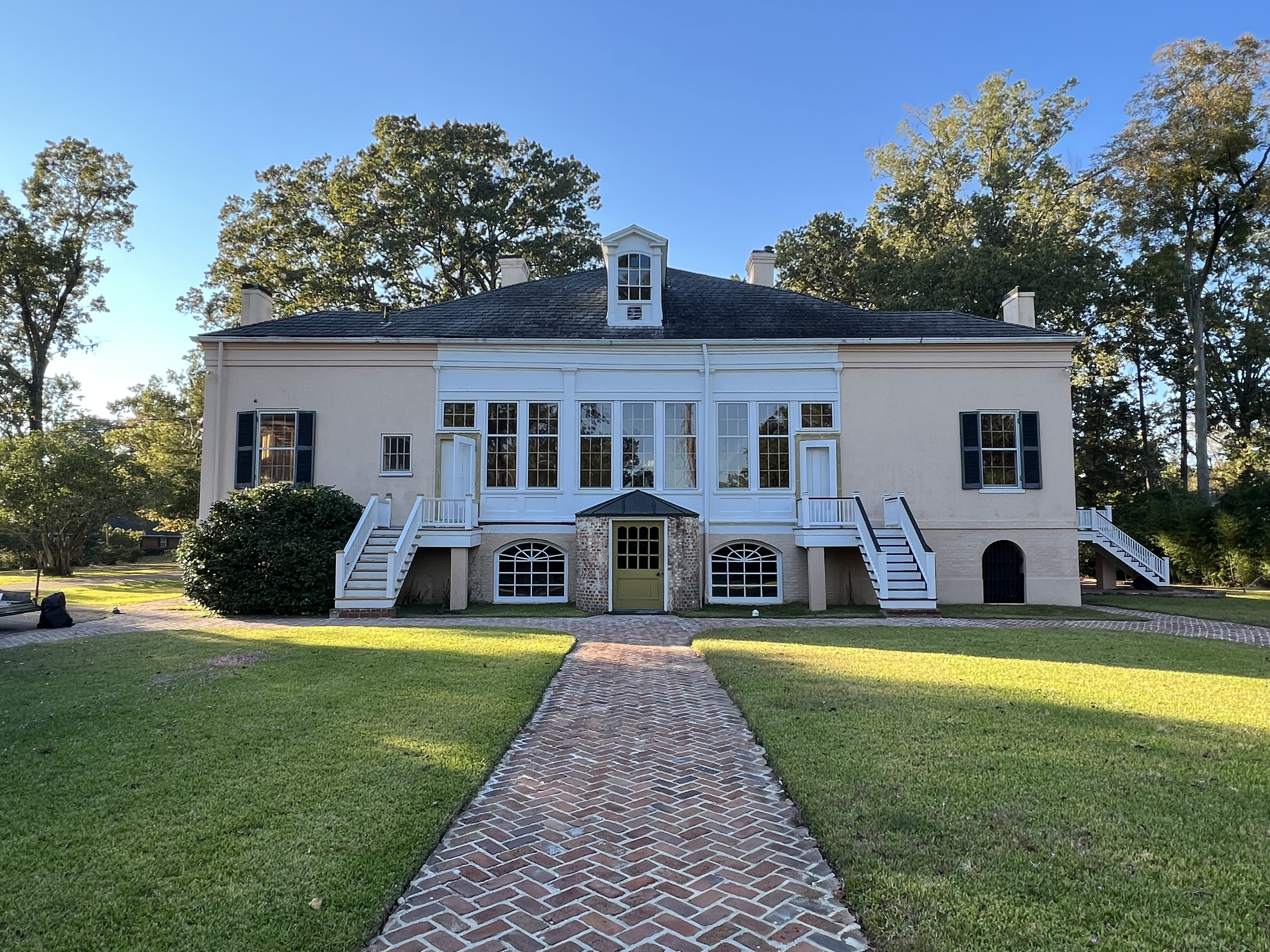
Oakland rear

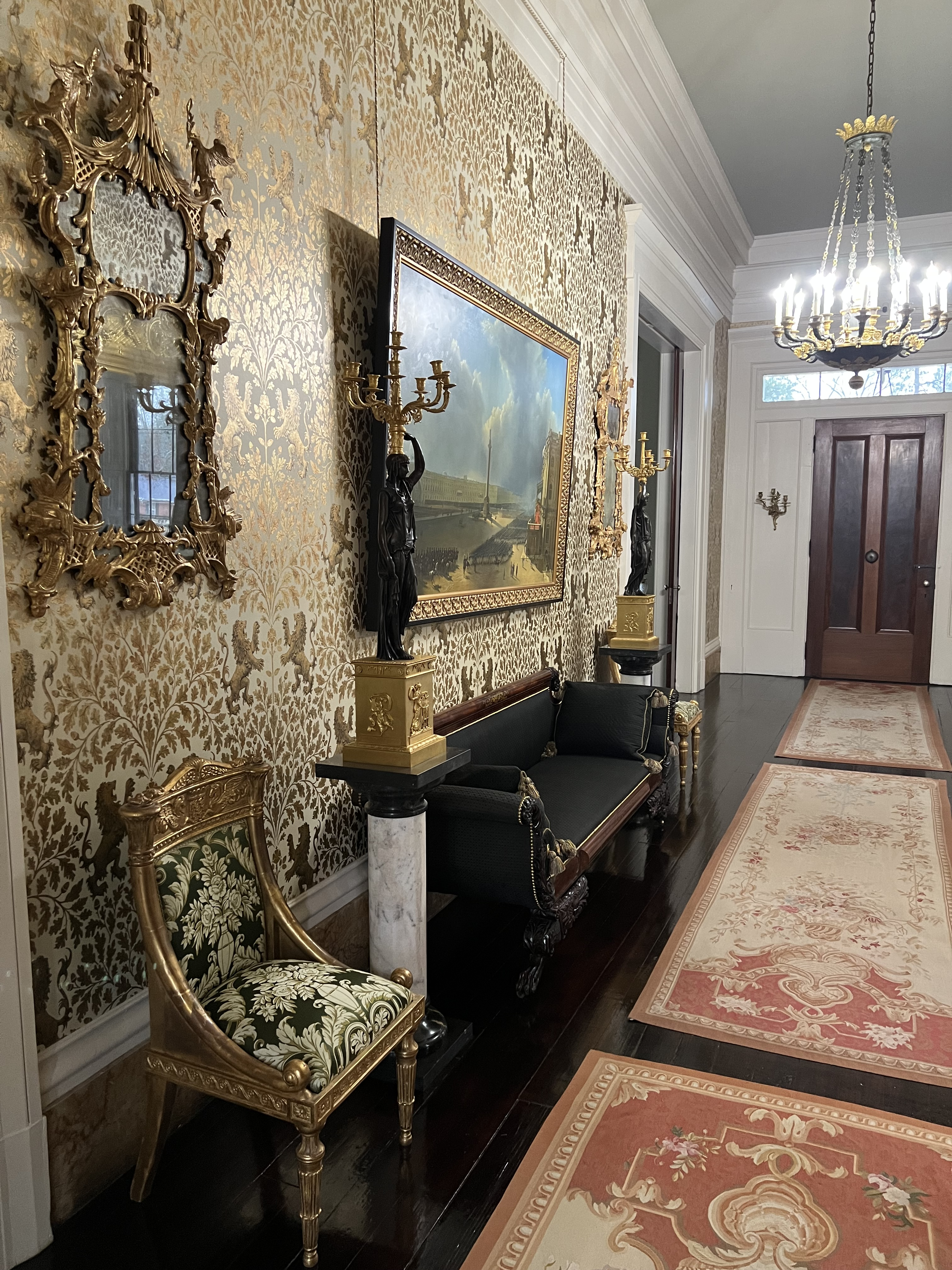
Oakland entry hall

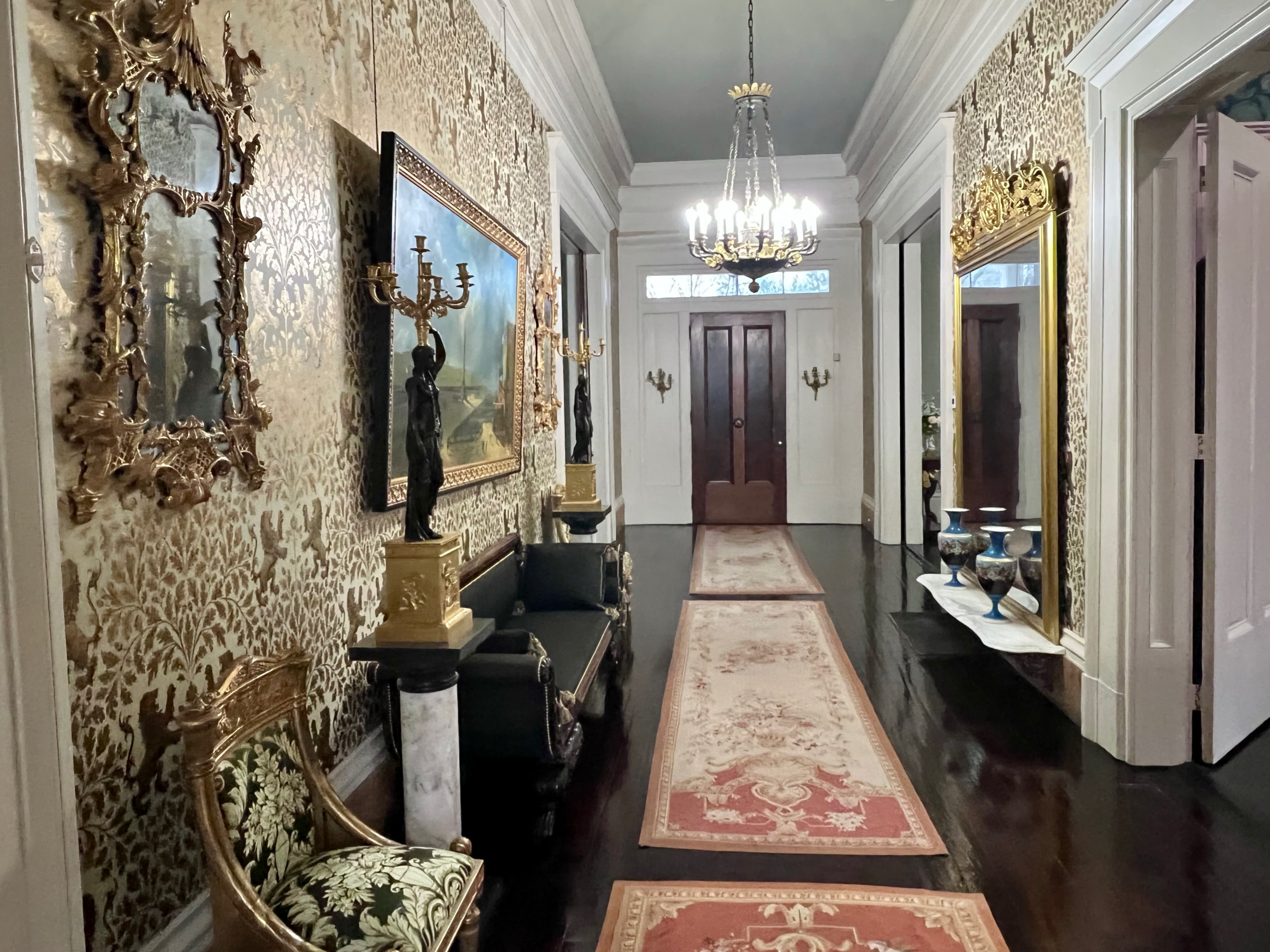
Oakland entry hall 2

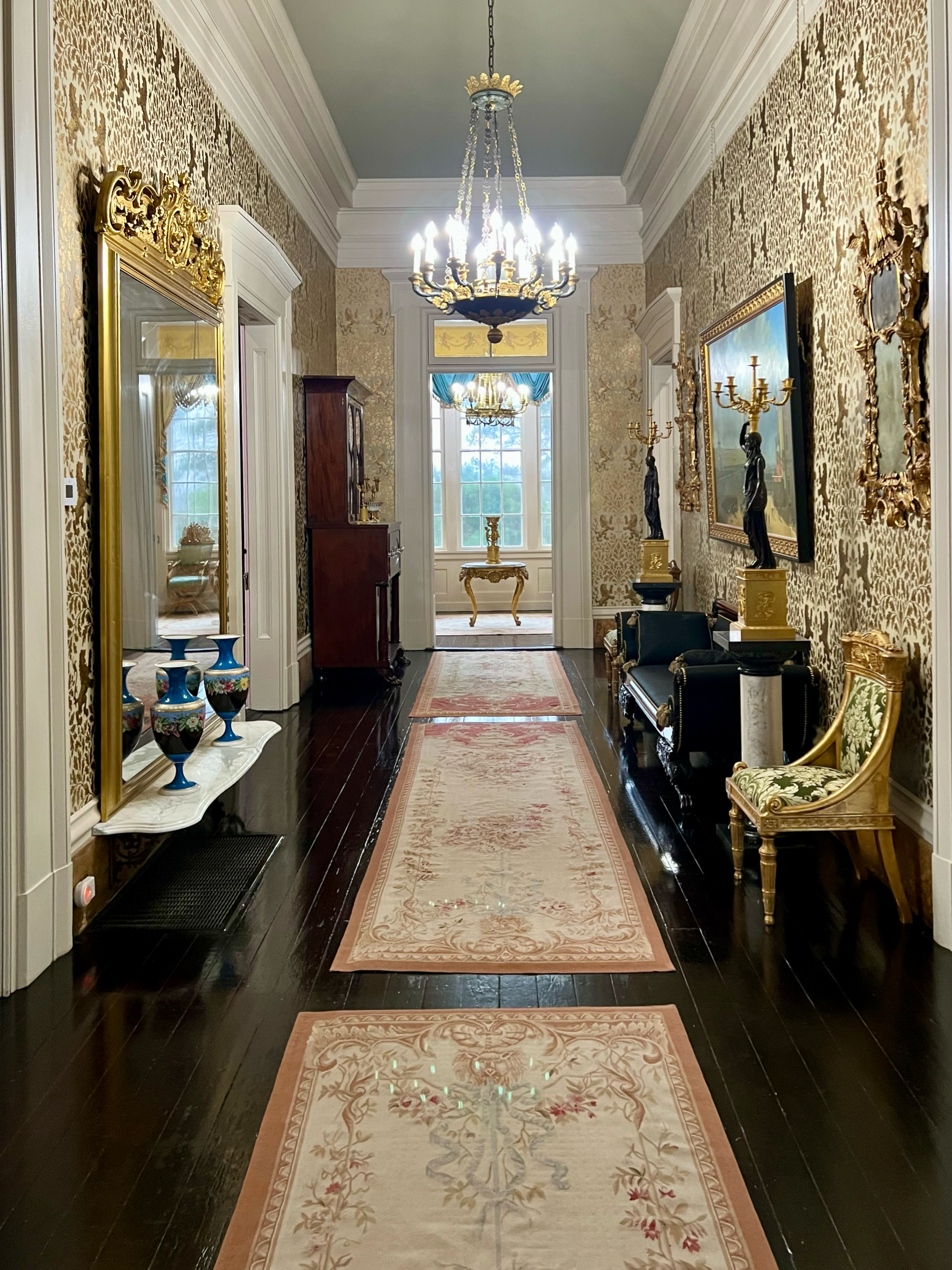

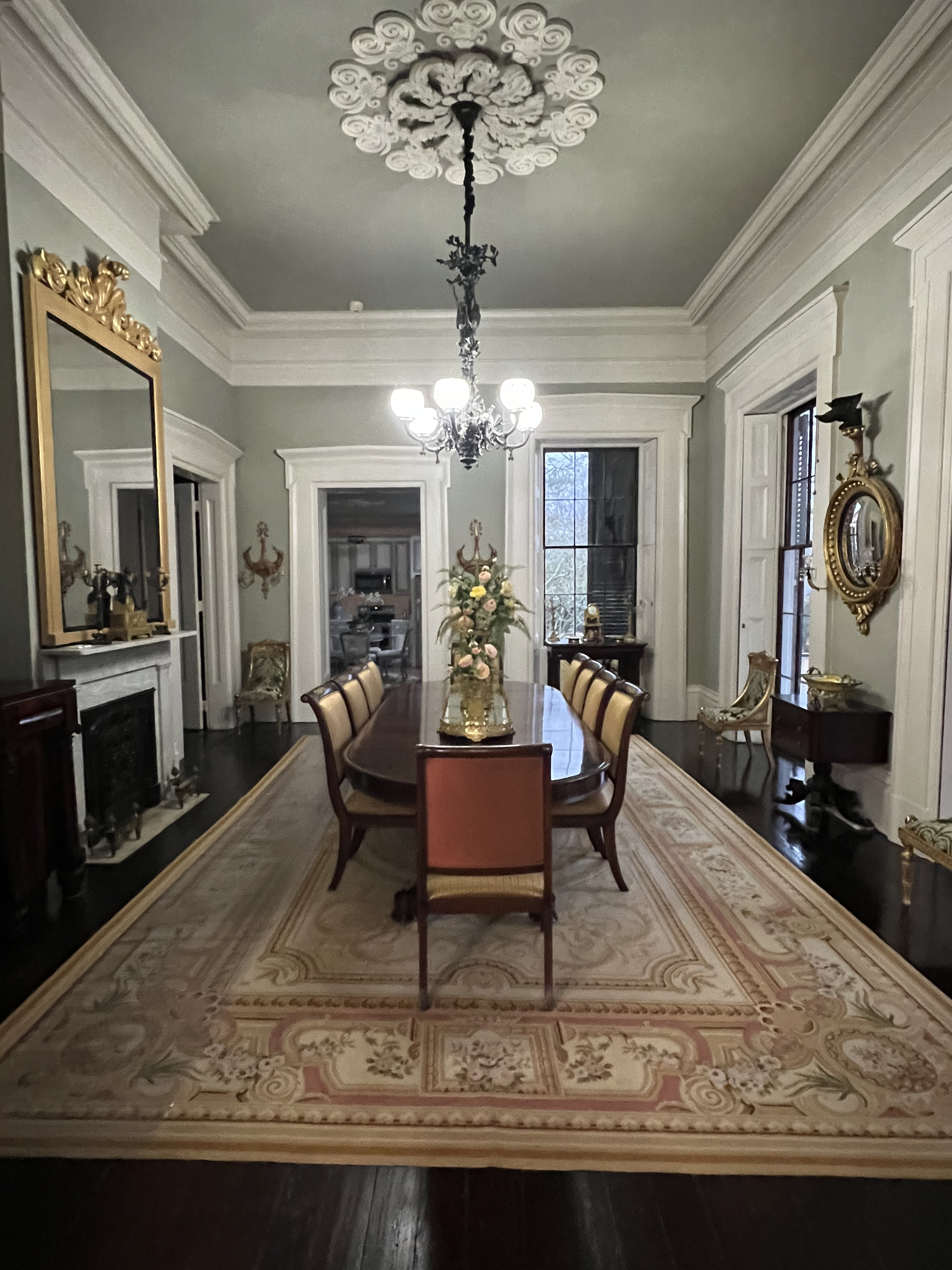
Oakland dining room

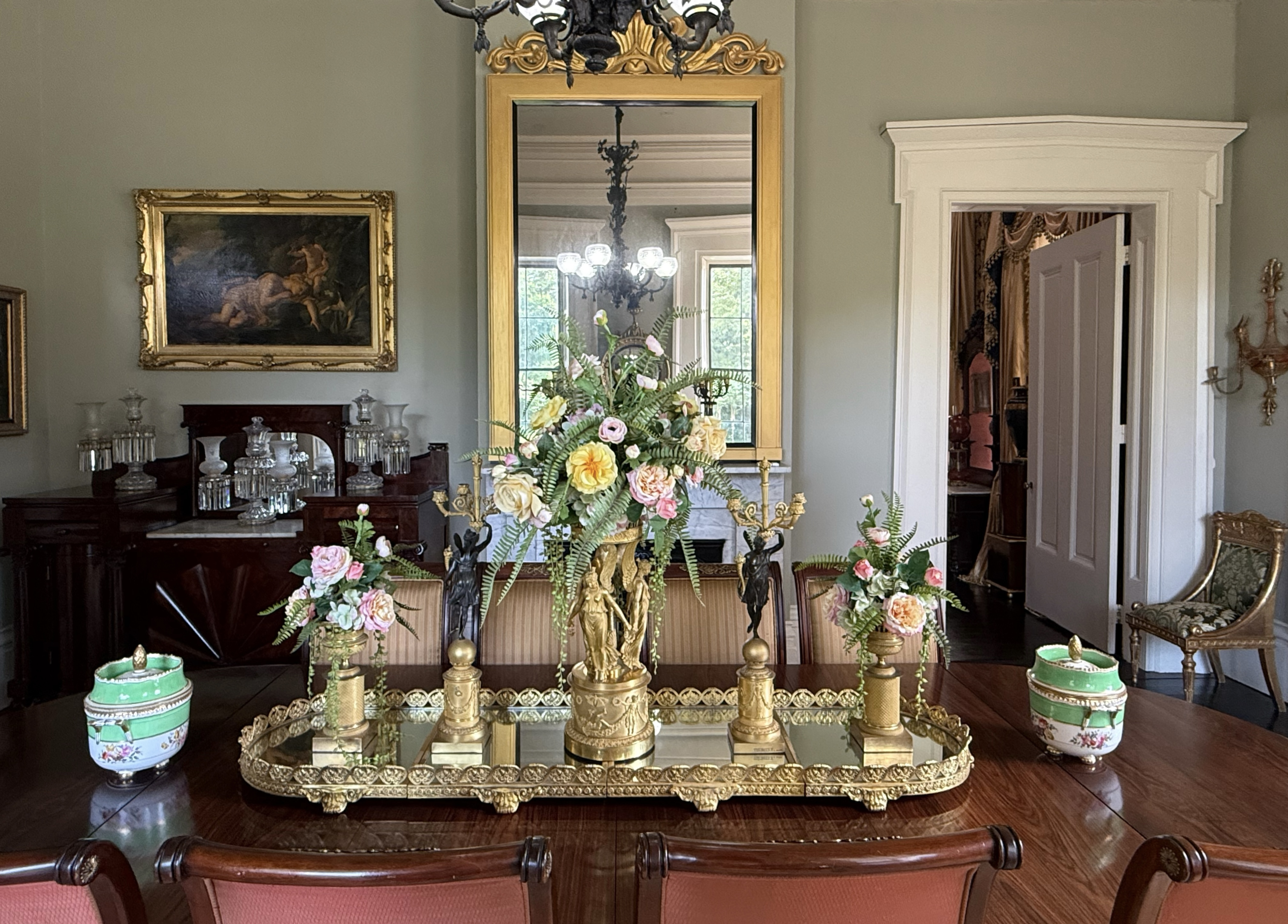

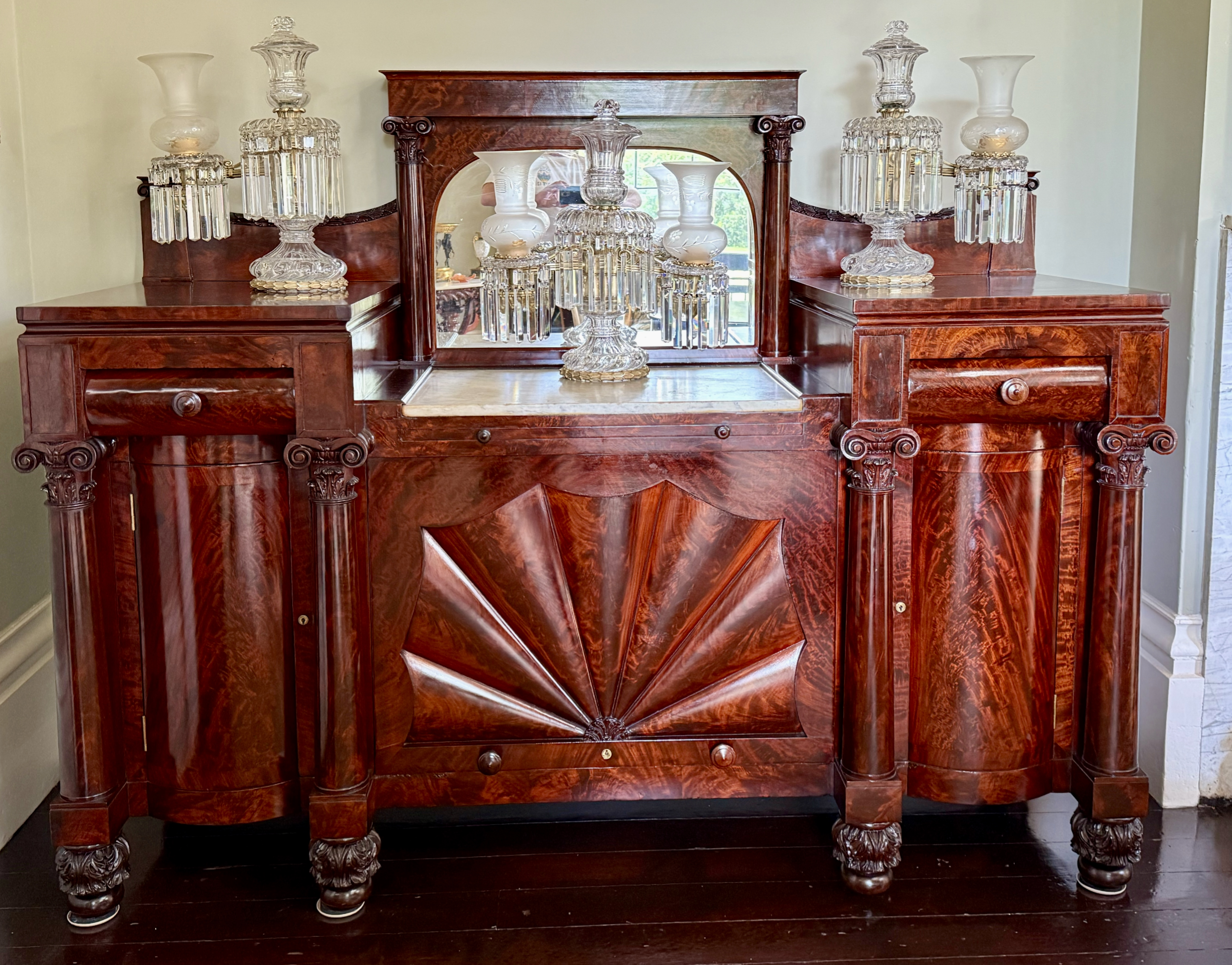

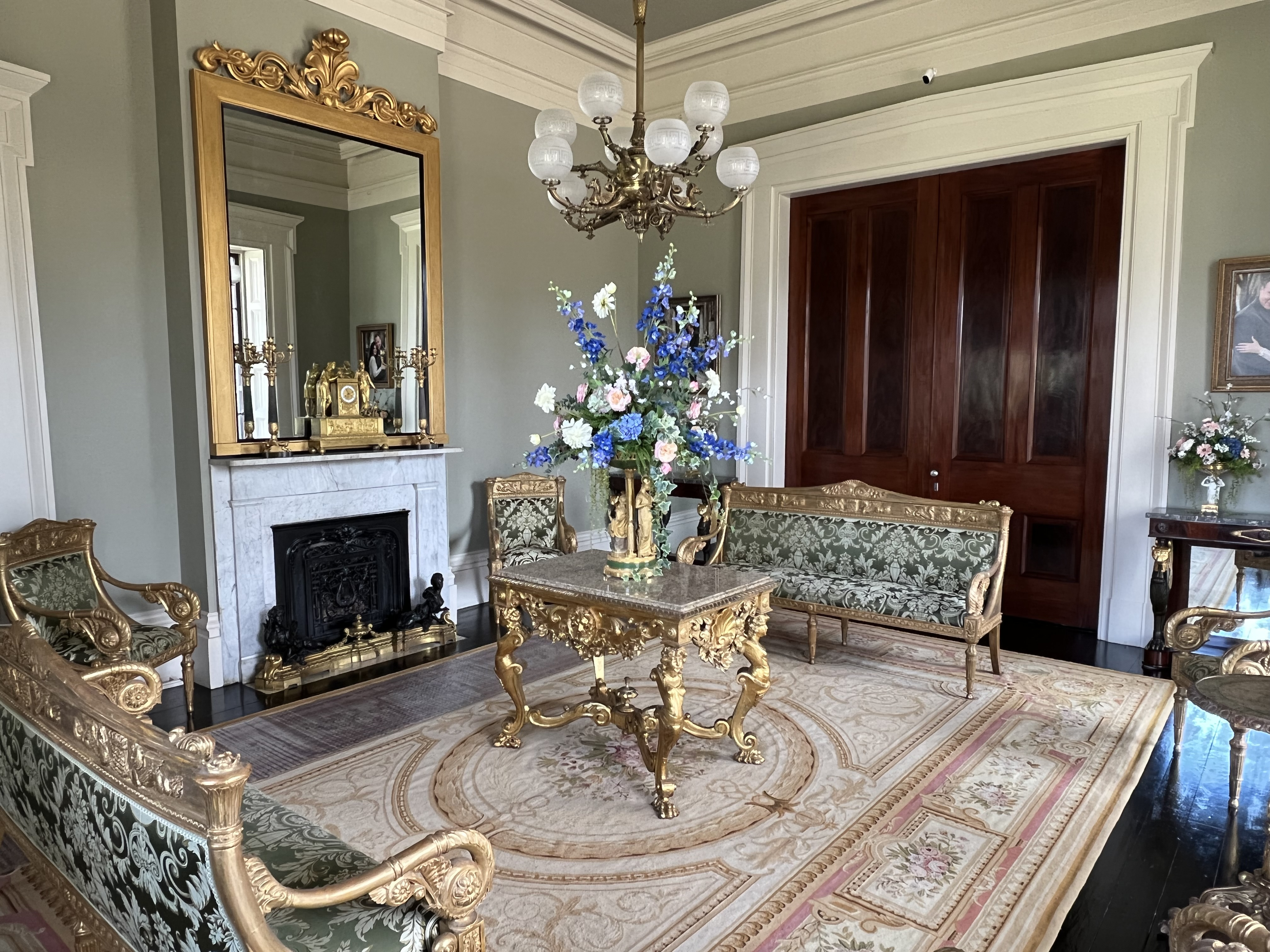
Oakland parlor

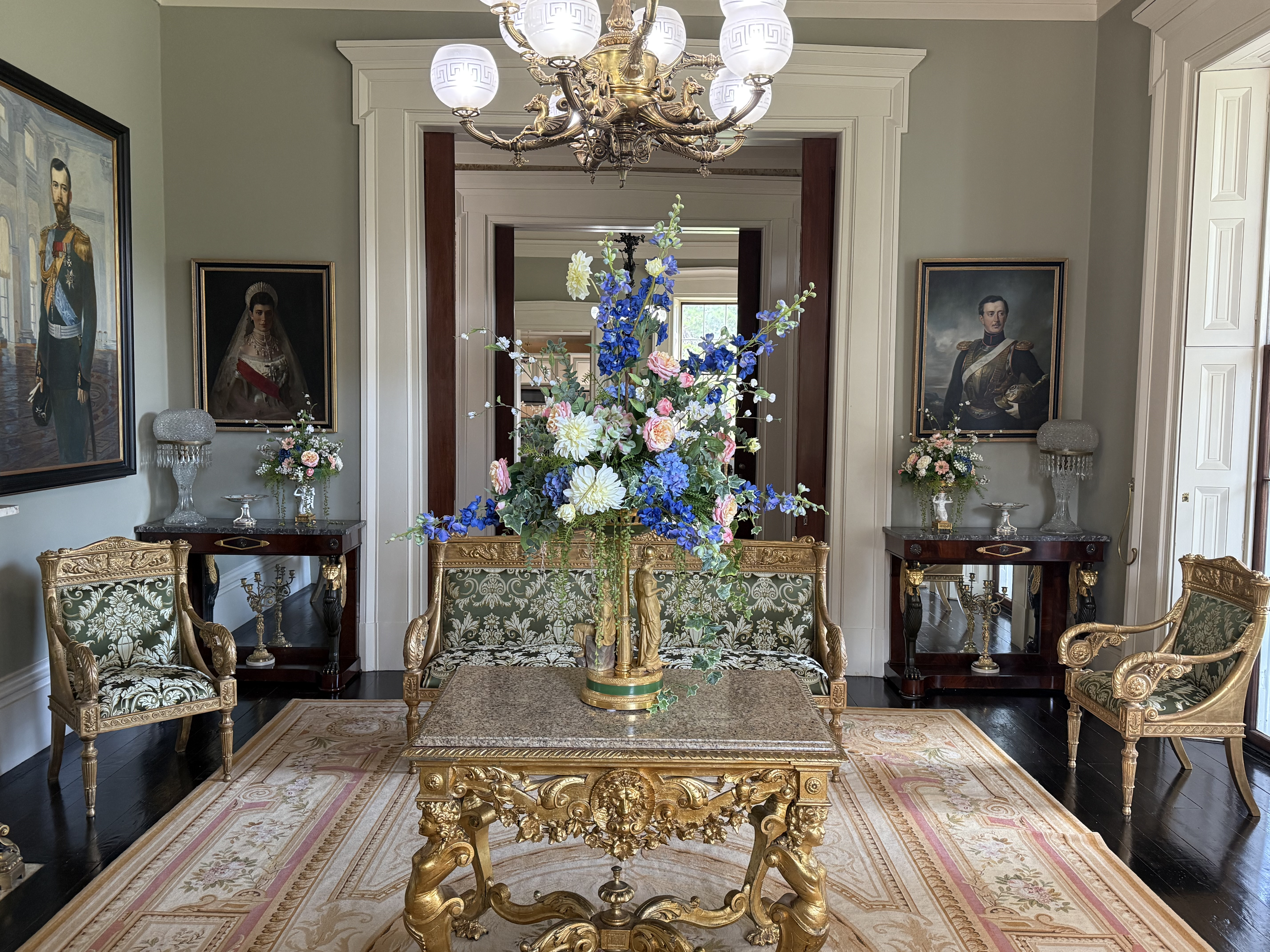

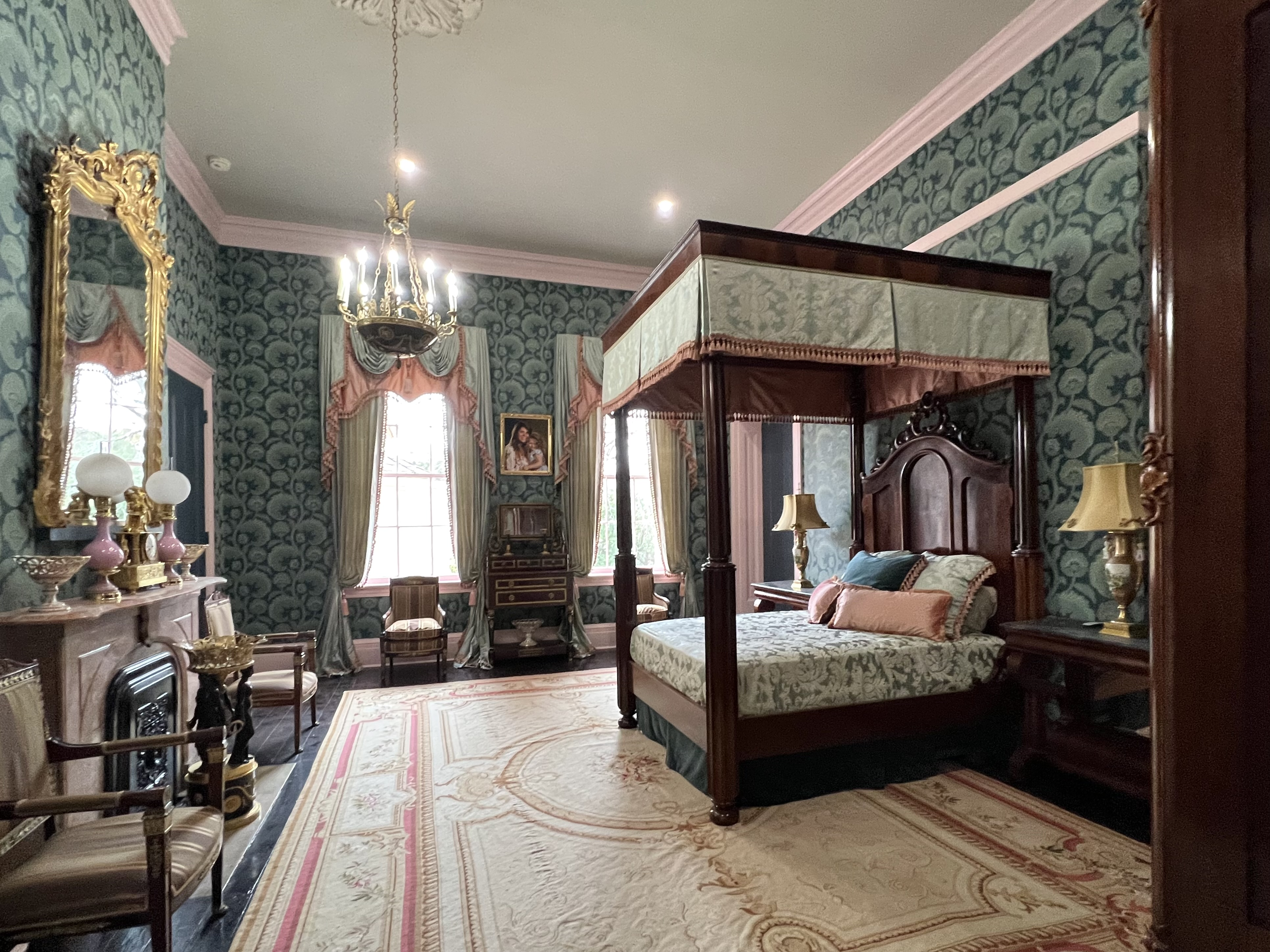
Oakland green bedroom

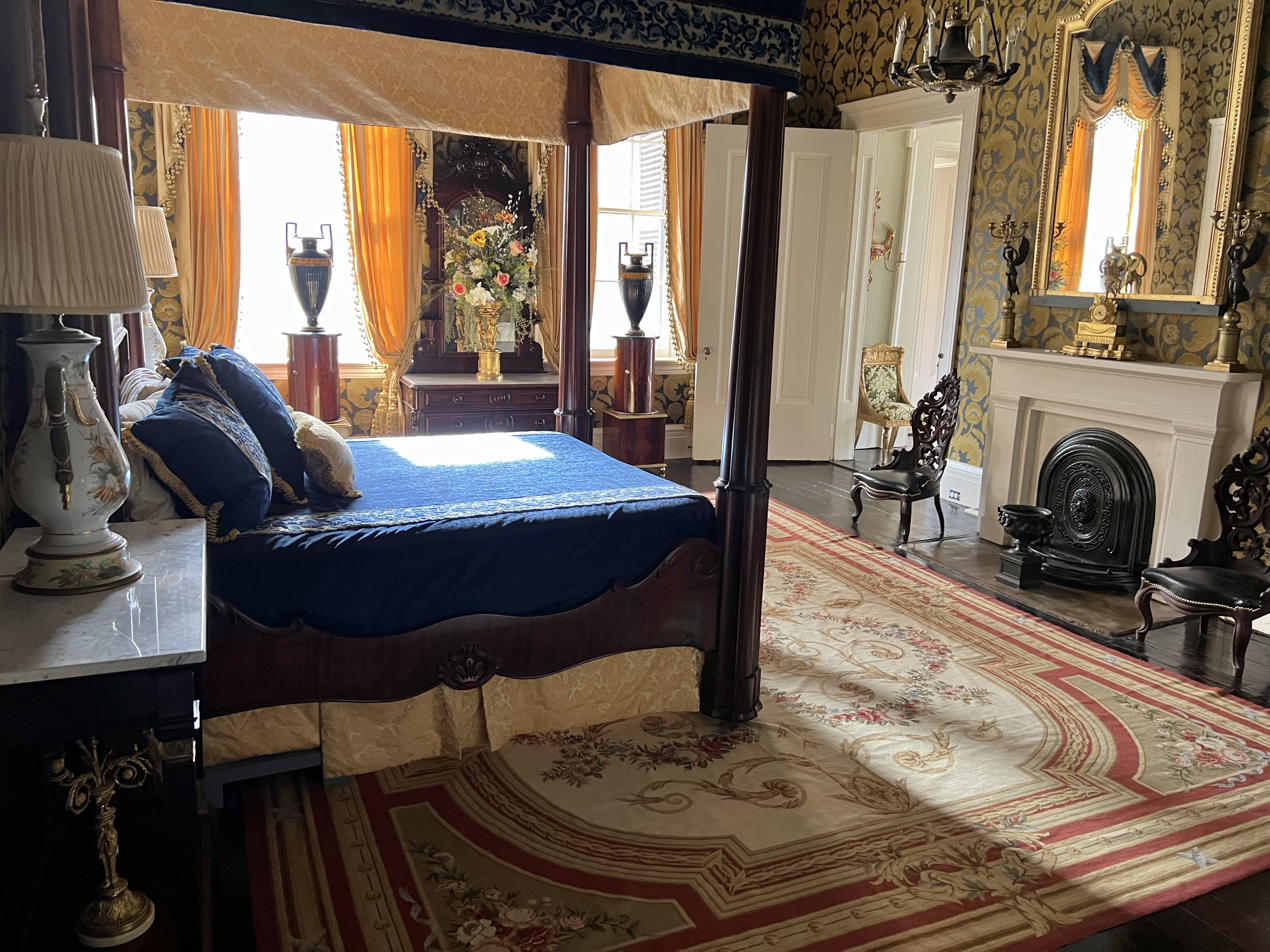

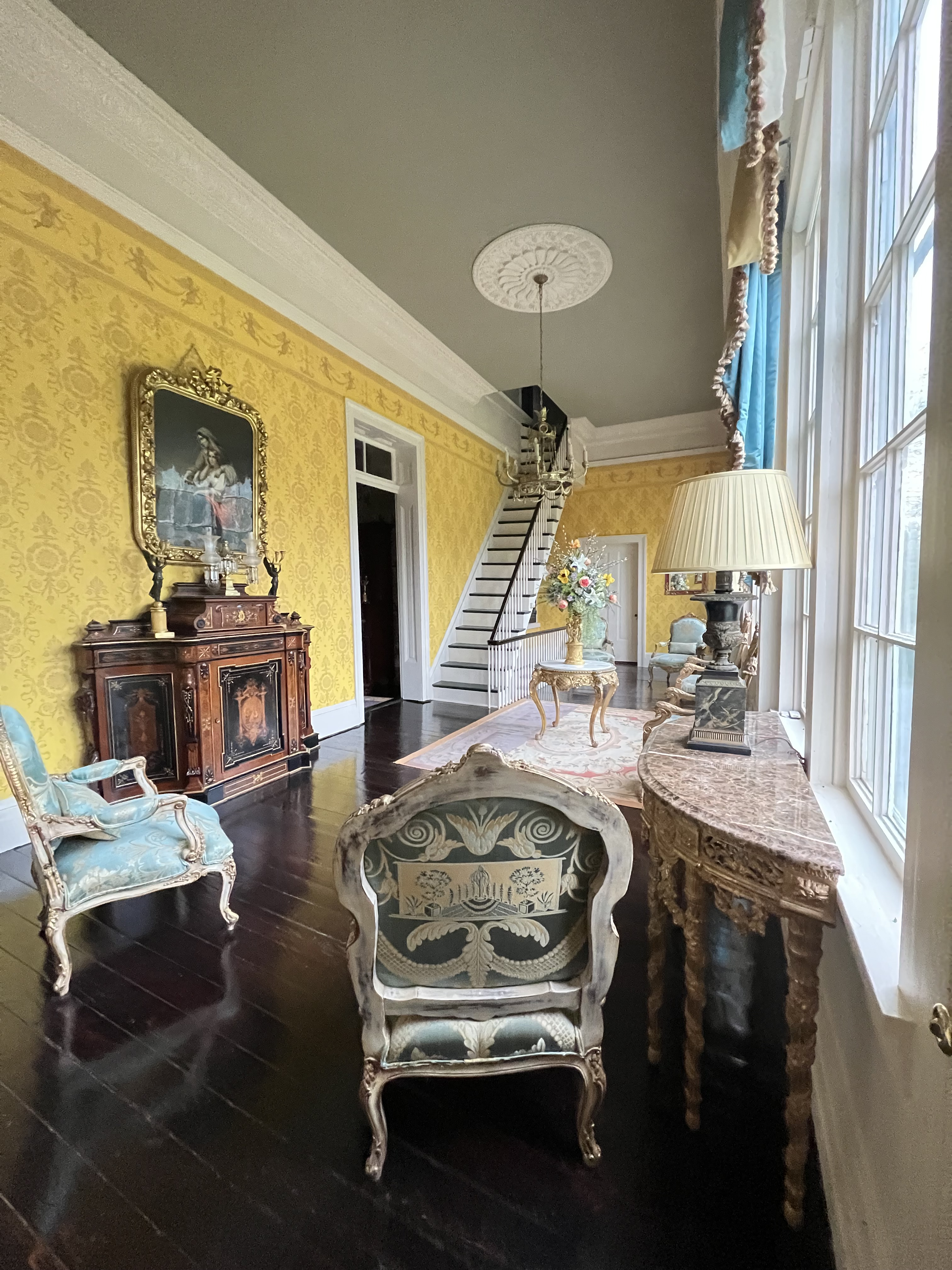

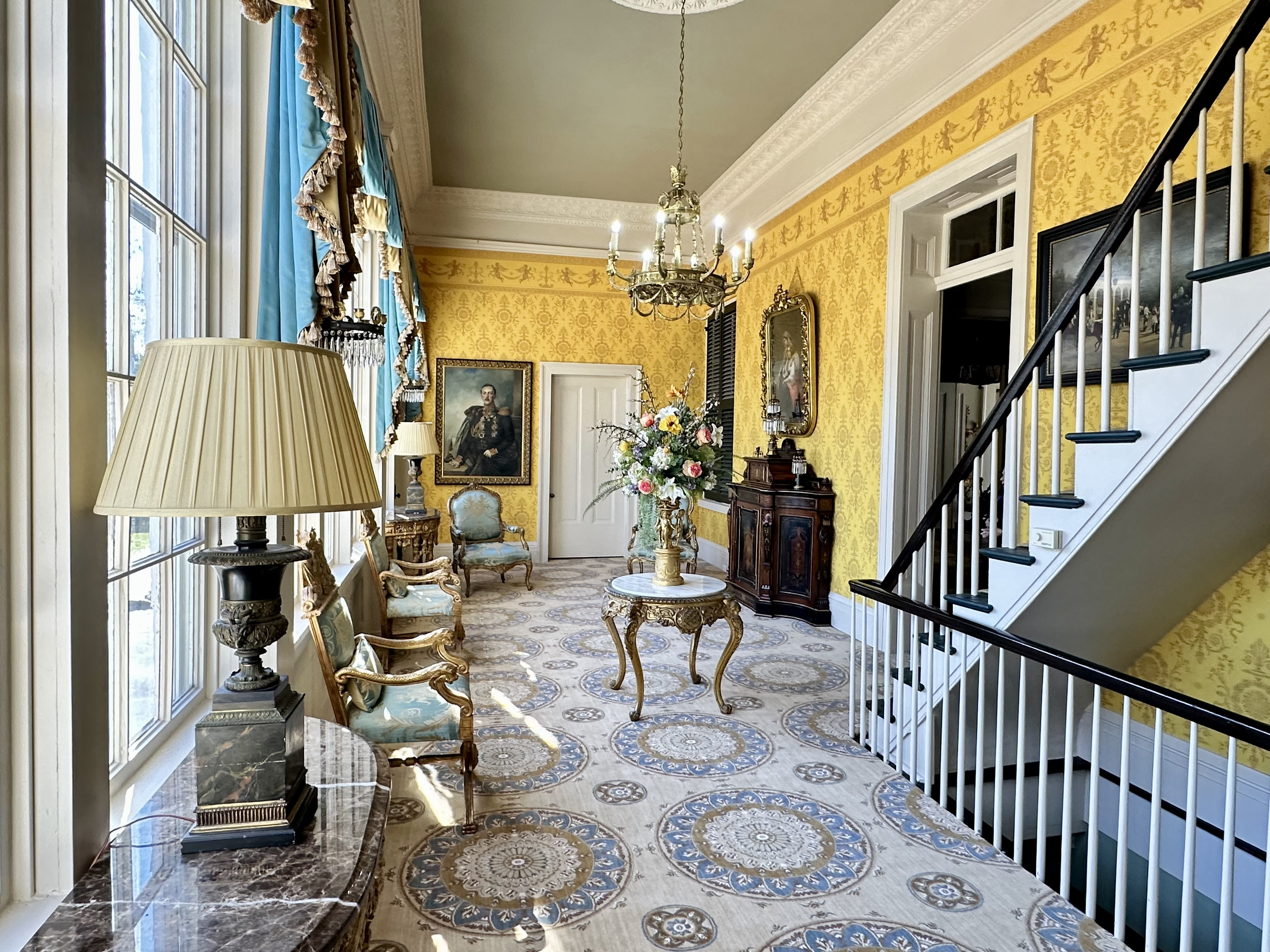

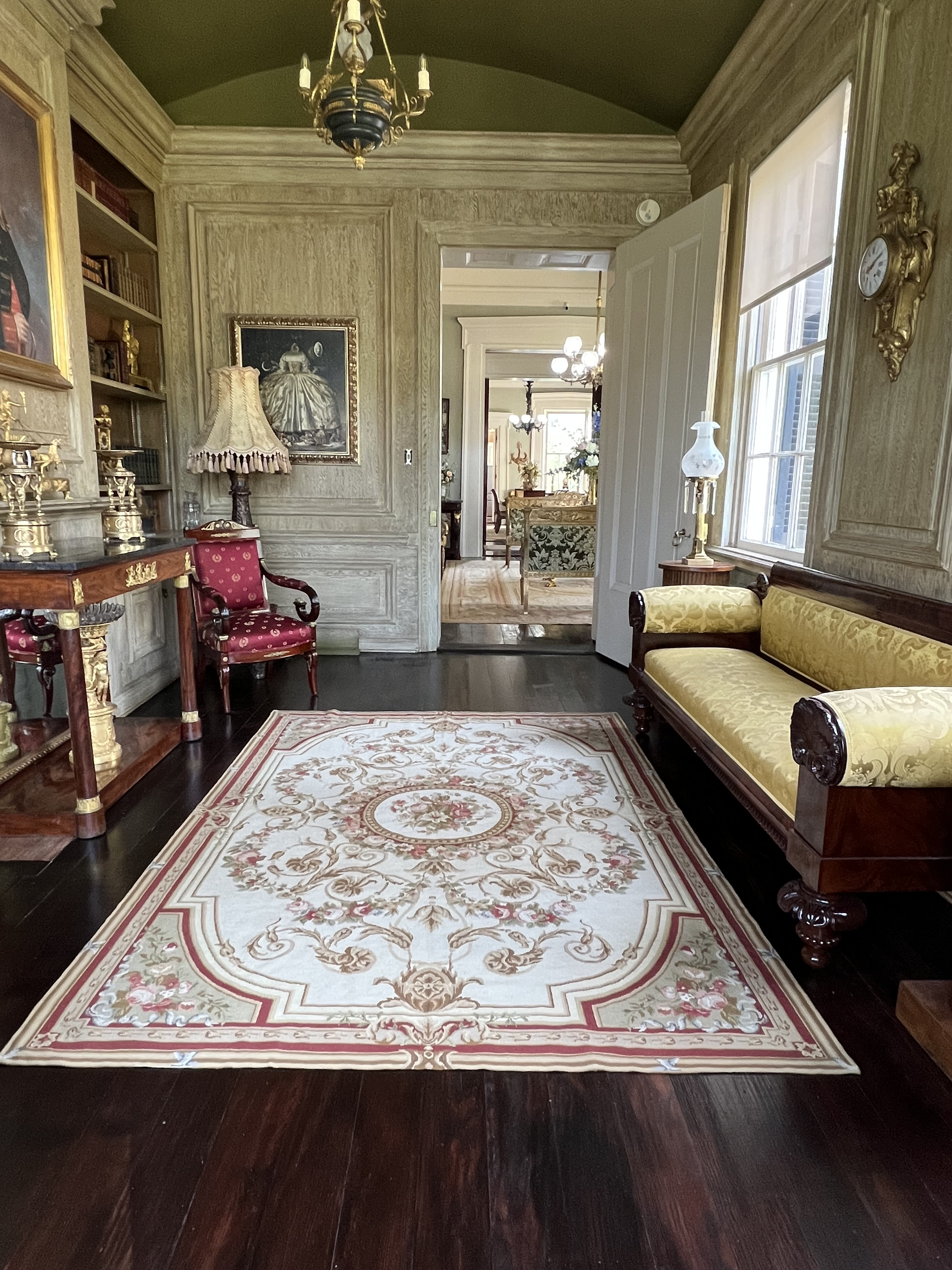

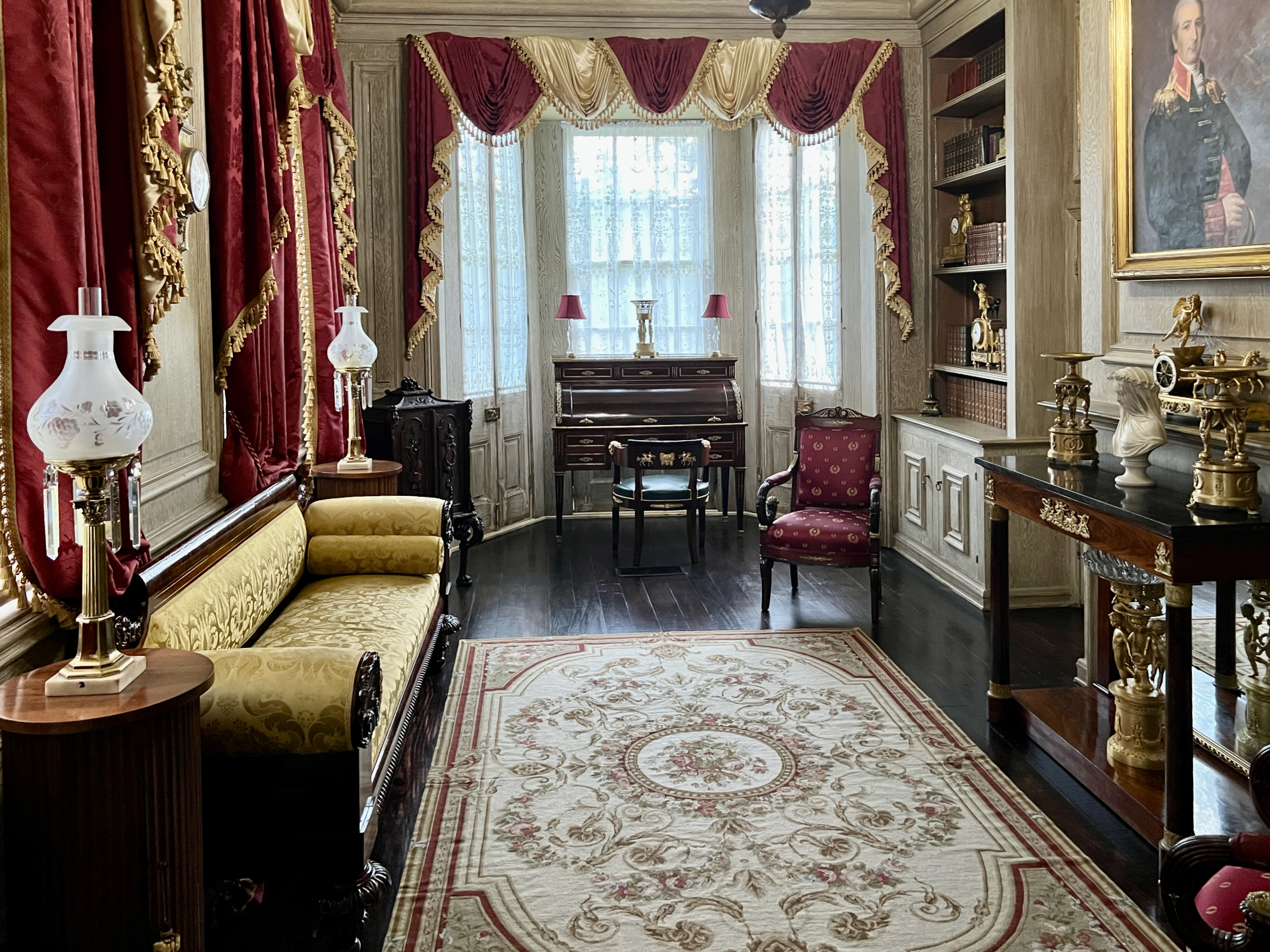

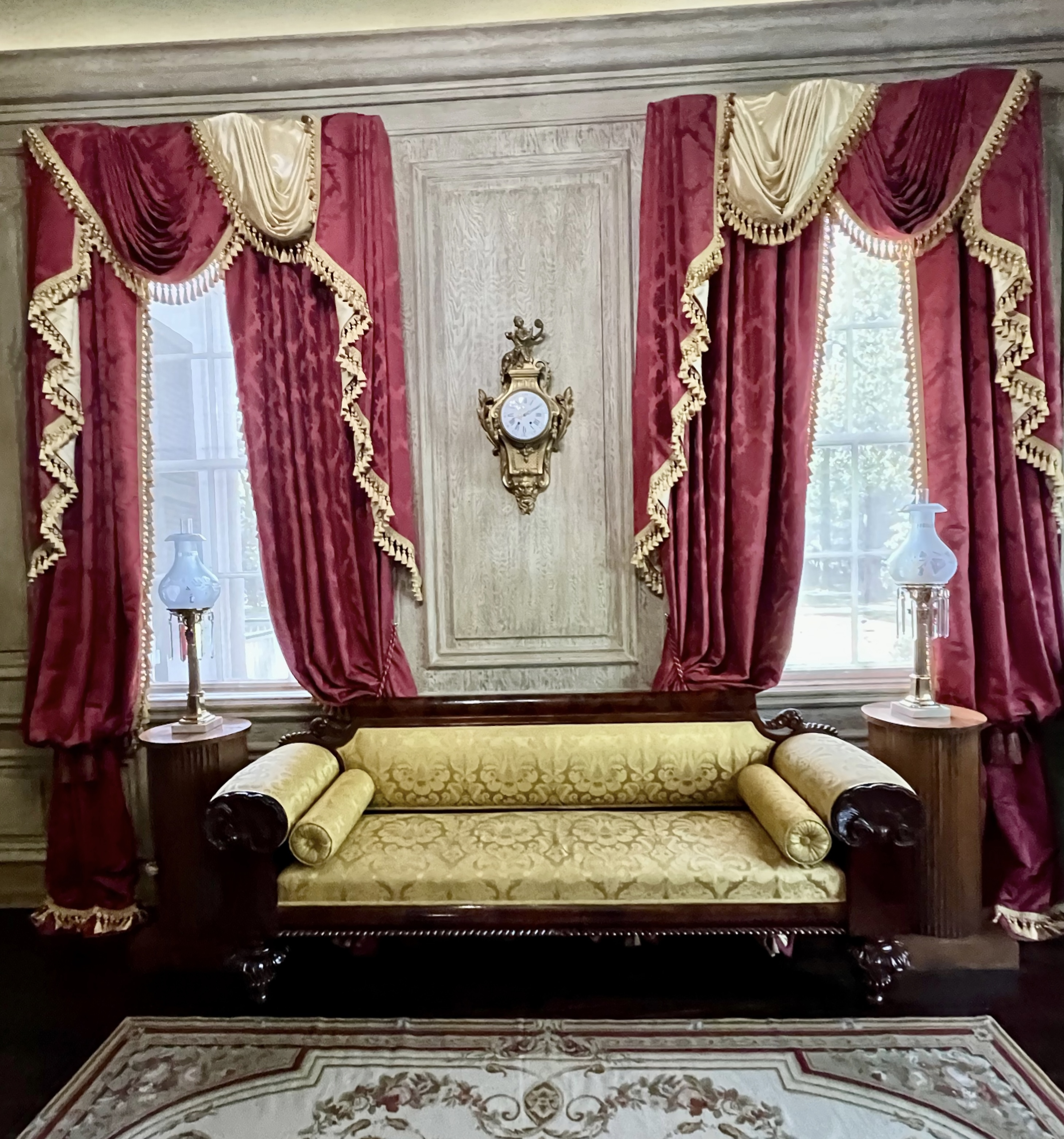

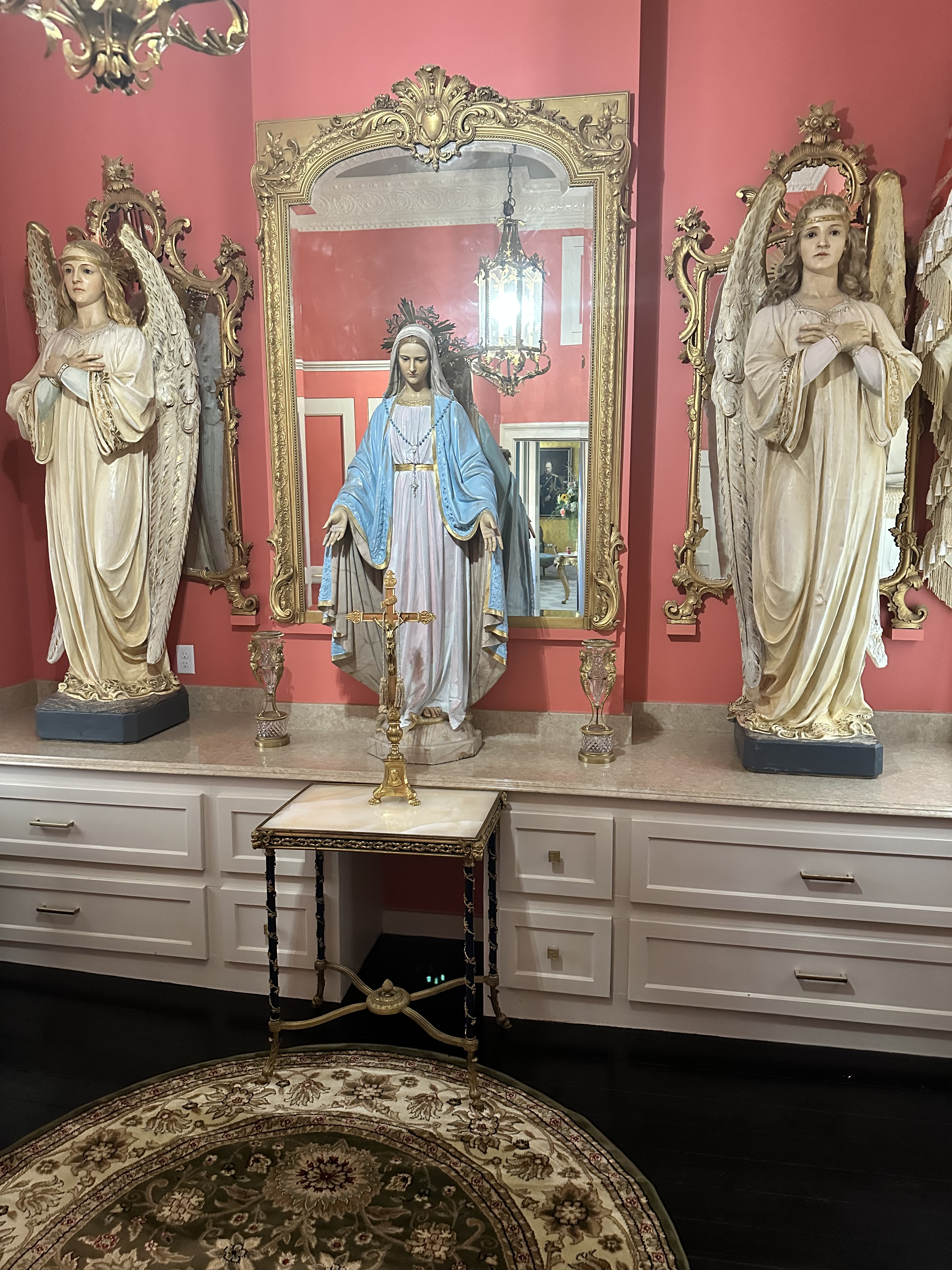

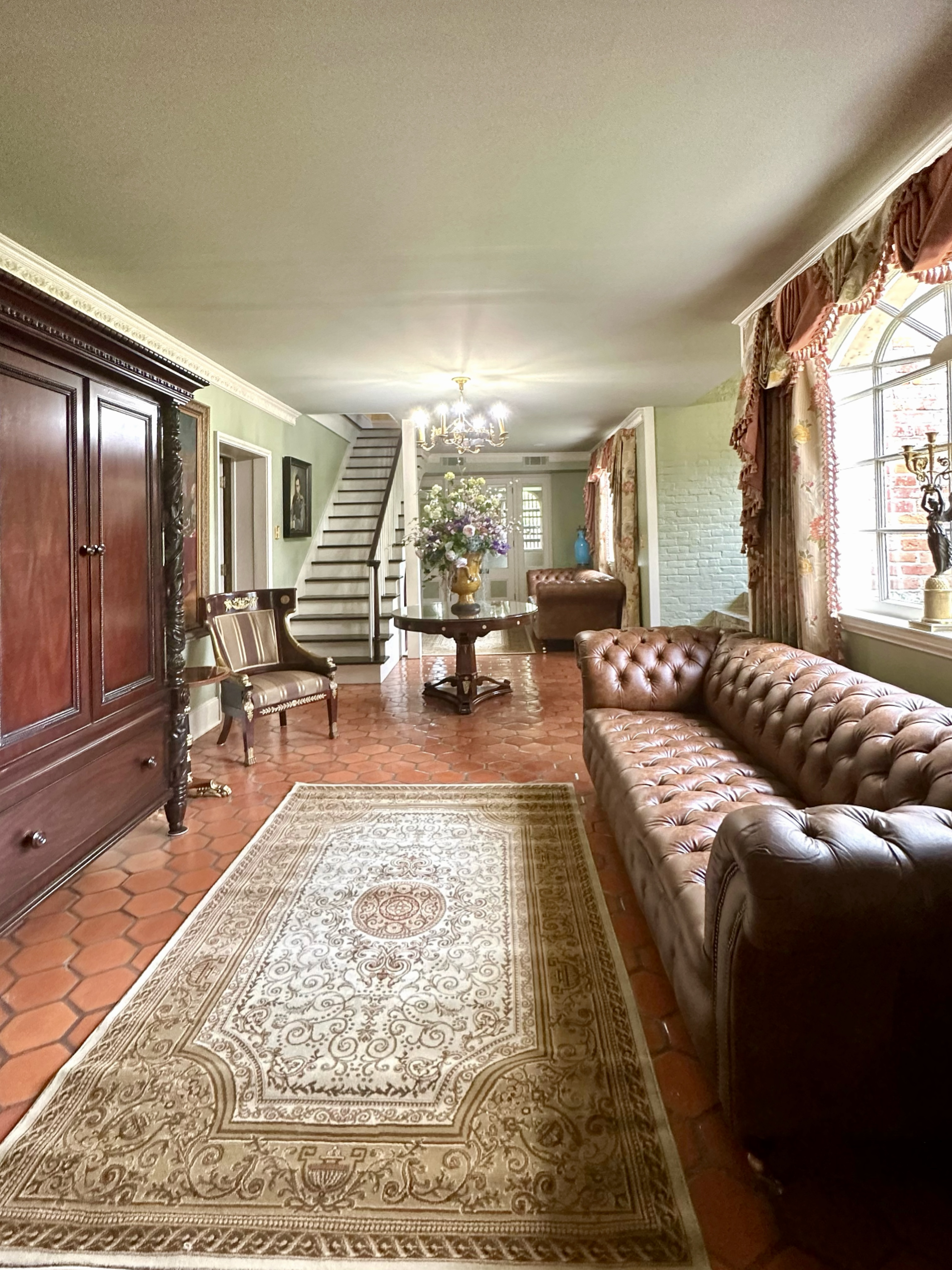

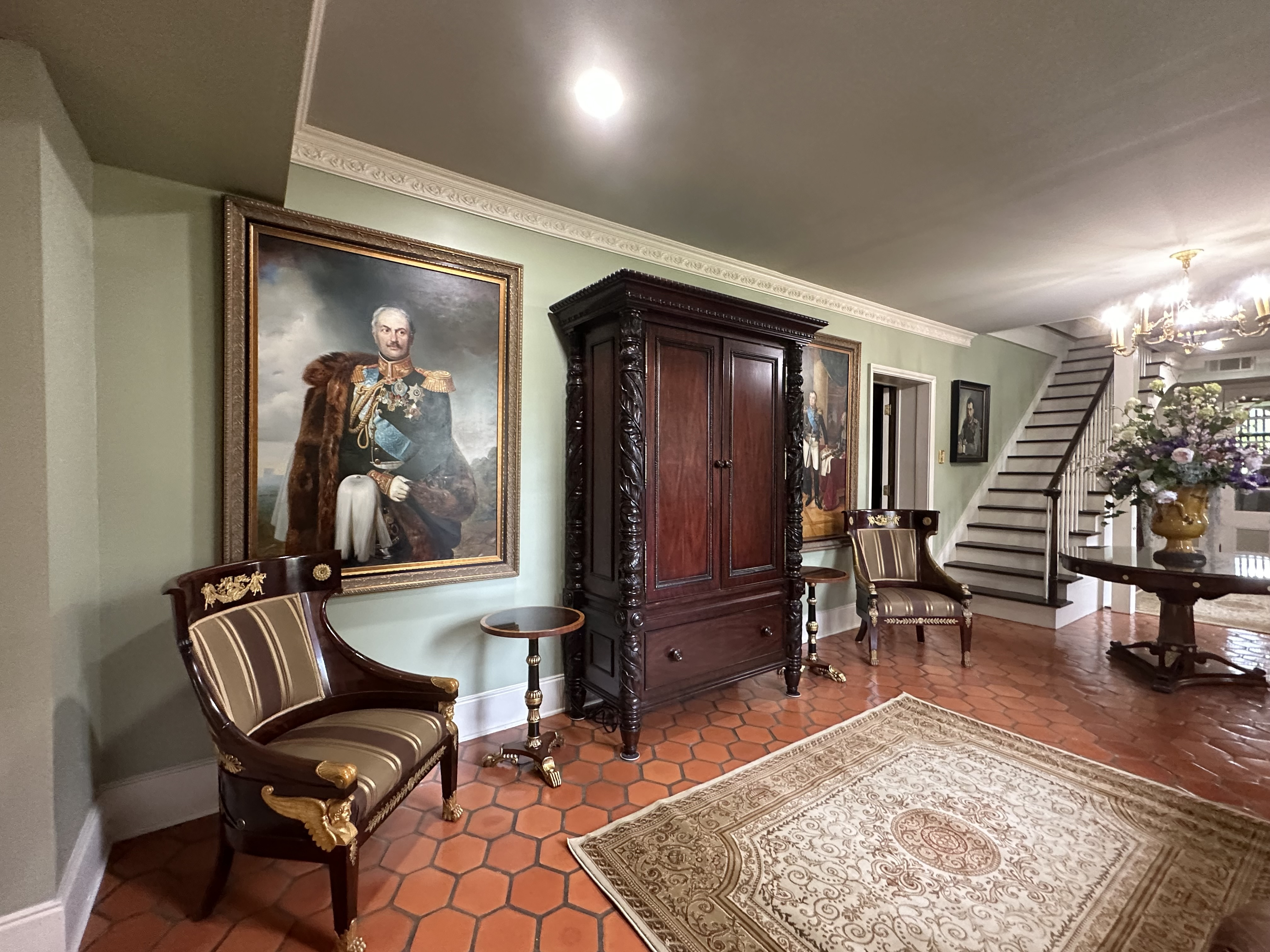

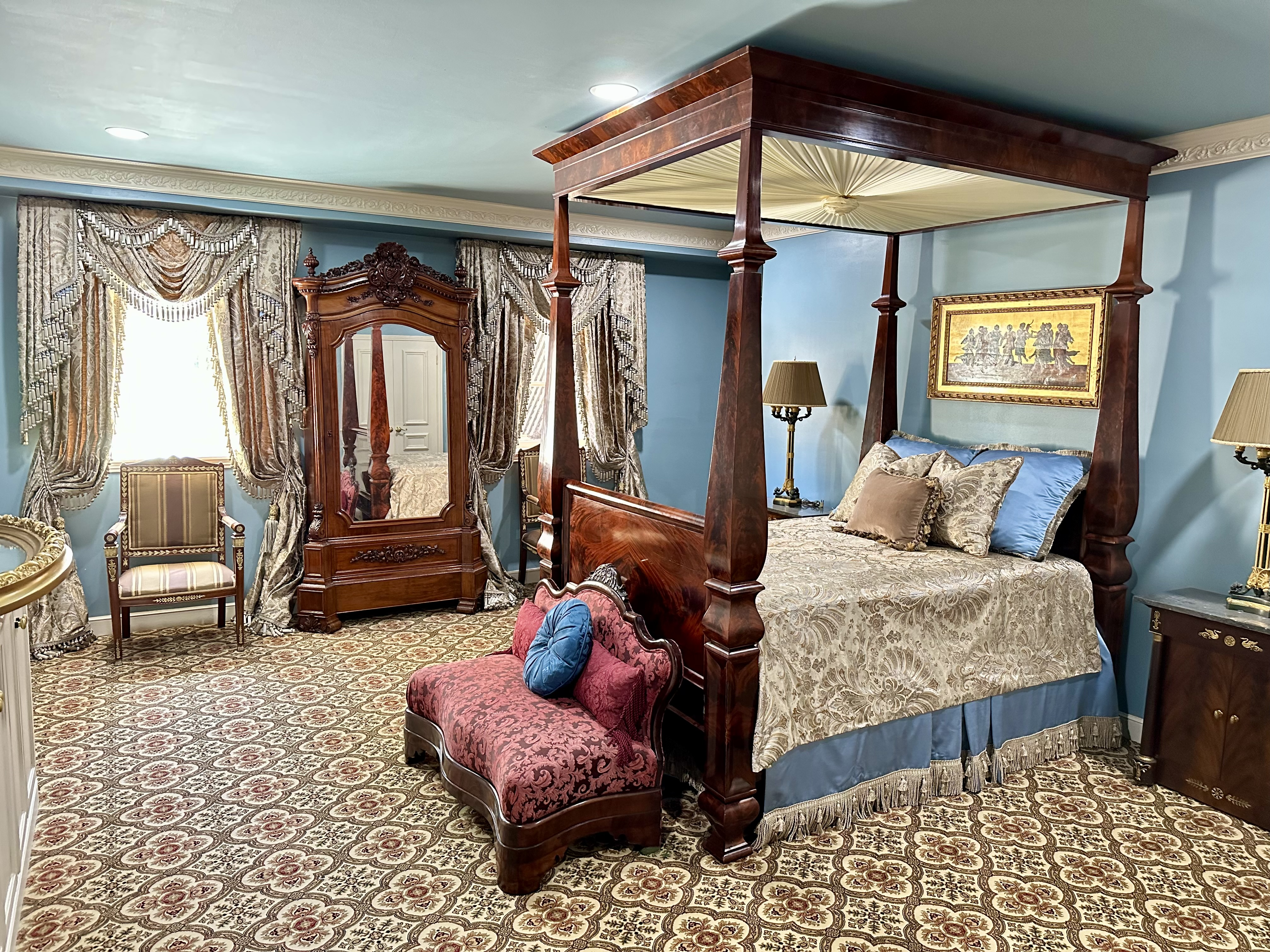

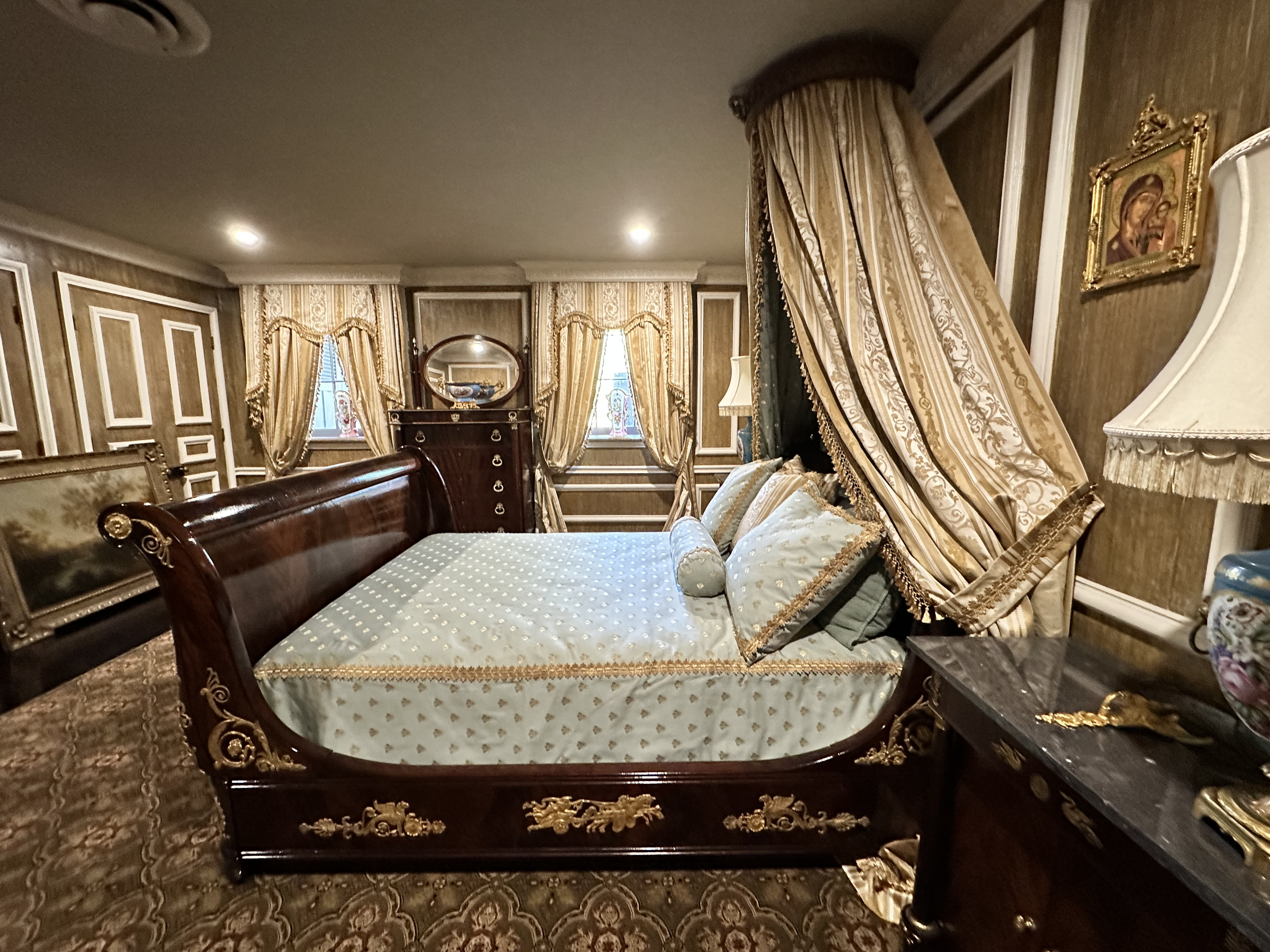

Oakland is a historic house in Natchez, Adams County, Mississippi, U.S.A.

== Location ==
It is located at 9 Oakhurst Drive in Natchez, Mississippi.

== History ==
Oakland was built by Horatio Sprague Eustis (1811 - 1858) as a wedding gift for his wife Catherine Chotard (1820 - 1877) in 1840. The land (22.5 acres) had been part of her wedding dowry from her father Major Henry Chotard (1987 - 1870) in 1838. It was built in the Greek Revival style and consisted of the main house and two large outbuildings (only one of which survives) forming a “U” shape compound with a long alley of majestic Oaks approaching from the west. After graduating from Harvard in 1830, Mr Eustis had relocated from Rhode Island to Natchez where he practiced law. Miss Chotard was from a prominent Natchez family with her maternal grandfather being the last Spanish Governor of the Natchez territory Stephen Minor (1760-1815) and her father having served as General Andrew Jackson’s aide-de-camp during the Battle of New Orleans in 1815. In 1857 the property was sold to her first cousin John Duncan Minor (grandson of the Spanish territorial governor) and his wife Katherine Surget Minor. Despite Mississippi’s secession during the American Civil War (1861–1865), the Minor’s remained steadfast Unionists and frequently entertained Federal officers following Natchez’s occupation in 1863. This was not well received by many in Natchez and the associated stress led to a decline in Mr Minor’s health leading to his death in 1869 at age 37. Oakland remained in the hands of the Minor family until 1949 when it was sold to Alan W. Granning who subsequently subdivided the property leaving 3 1/2 acres around the residence. The title passes to Lawrence and Kate Don Adams in 1960 after which the house became part of the annual Natchez Pilgrimage. In 2021 the property was purchased by Dr Thomas and Dorie LeMay who undertook a three year complete restoration. Along with the extensive repairs, the LeMay’s furnished the home with period American, French as well as Russian furniture and decorative arts. They continue to upgrade the property and its collections while splitting their time between this and their other Natchez home the LeMay Arrighi mansion.

Recognition includes the 2023 Natchez Historic Foundation “Ethel and George Kelly Award for Historic Restoration” and the 2024 Mississippi Heritage Trust “Award of Merit”.

It has been listed on the National Register of Historic Places since October 21, 1976.
