= Joseph Henry Bush =

American painter

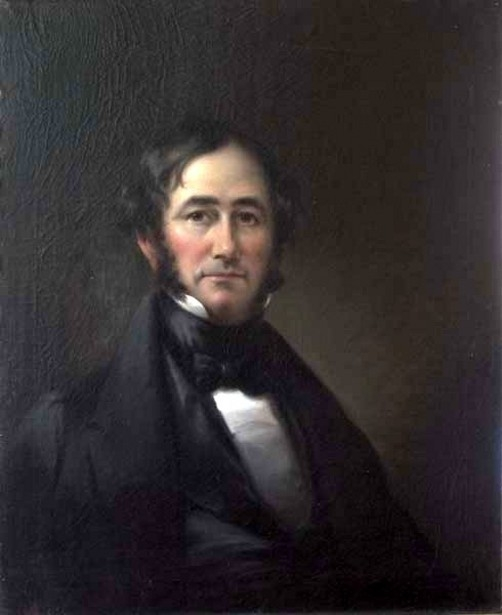
- Self-portrait, 1837
- Born: 1794/1800; Mercer County, Kentucky, U.S.
- Died: January 11, 1865; Lexington, Kentucky, U.S.
- Resting place: Lexington Cemetery
- Occupation: Painter

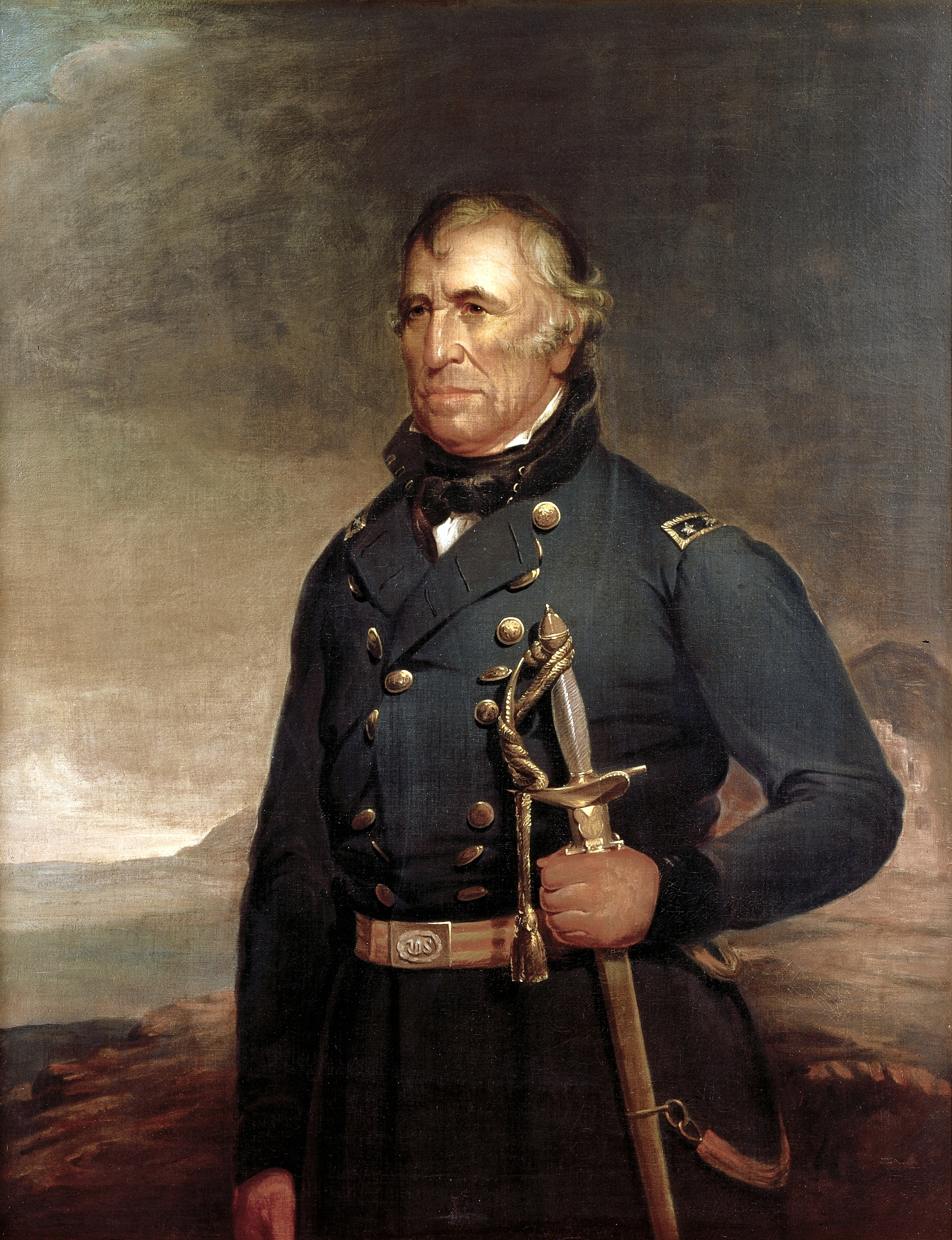
Portrait of Zachary Taylor by Joseph Henry Bush.

Joseph Henry Bush (1794/1800 – January 11, 1865) was an American portrait painter. Born in Kentucky, he was trained by Thomas Sully in Philadelphia, and he opened his first studio in Frankfort, followed by Lexington and Louisville. He also lived in Cincinnati, Ohio. His work was exhibited at the Kentucky Governor's Mansion in 2011 with other Kentucky portraitists. His portrait of President Zachary Taylor is at the White House.
