= Pharsalia Race Course =

Mississippi horse-racing venue

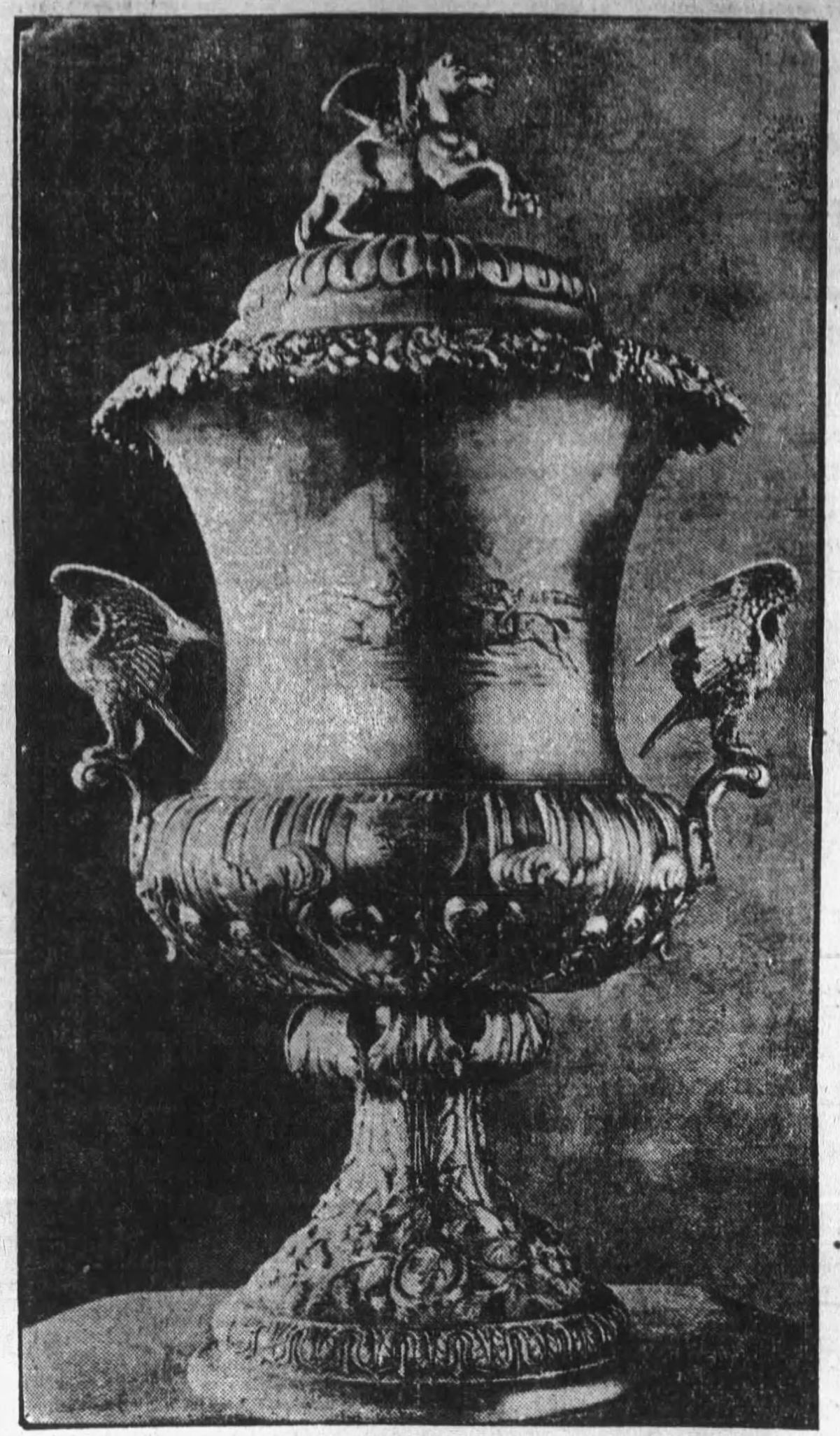
Pharsalia Plate horse racing trophy photographed c. 1905

The Pharsalia Race Course in Mississippi was established around 1790 in what was then Spanish West Florida. Pharsalia Race Course was considered the premier horse racing venue in Mississippi prior to the American Civil War.

== Description ==
The owners of the horses and members of the associated jockey club were drawn from the local planter elite. The leading breeders of horses raced at the track prior to the American Civil War were the families of James Surget, William J. Minor, and Adam L. Bingaman, as well as "those of Duncan F. Kenner and the Wells' and others from Louisiana." As was the case elsewhere in the South, the jockeys and grooms were enslaved and Black, and horses and slaves alike were used for stakes. Pharsalia was best known for two-mile and four-mile heats. According to a 1905 history, "Natchez had its full meeting every year. It would run for four days. There was no bookmaking and the purses were subscribed. Owners would bet between themselves and all betting was man to man. A man's word was all sufficient to make a bet stand. The track was on the Washington road, where Marron's cotton field is located...The track was run by J. B. Pryor, who was brought here from Tennessee as a trainer for Col. A. L. Bingaman."

The track was first known as the St. Catherine's Course, for its location near St. Catherine's Creek, or the Toll Bridge Turf, being near the toll bridge on the road between Natchez and Washington, Mississippi. The later name was a nod to the Pharsalus battleground in Greece.

One of the prizes awarded for winning a race at this track was called the Pharsalia Plate; it survived as a physical prize until the 20th century in part because it had been buried on a sugar plantation during the war.

By 1920 all evidence of Pharsalia had vanished and the land had become a "plantation on the outskirts of town."

== Additional images ==
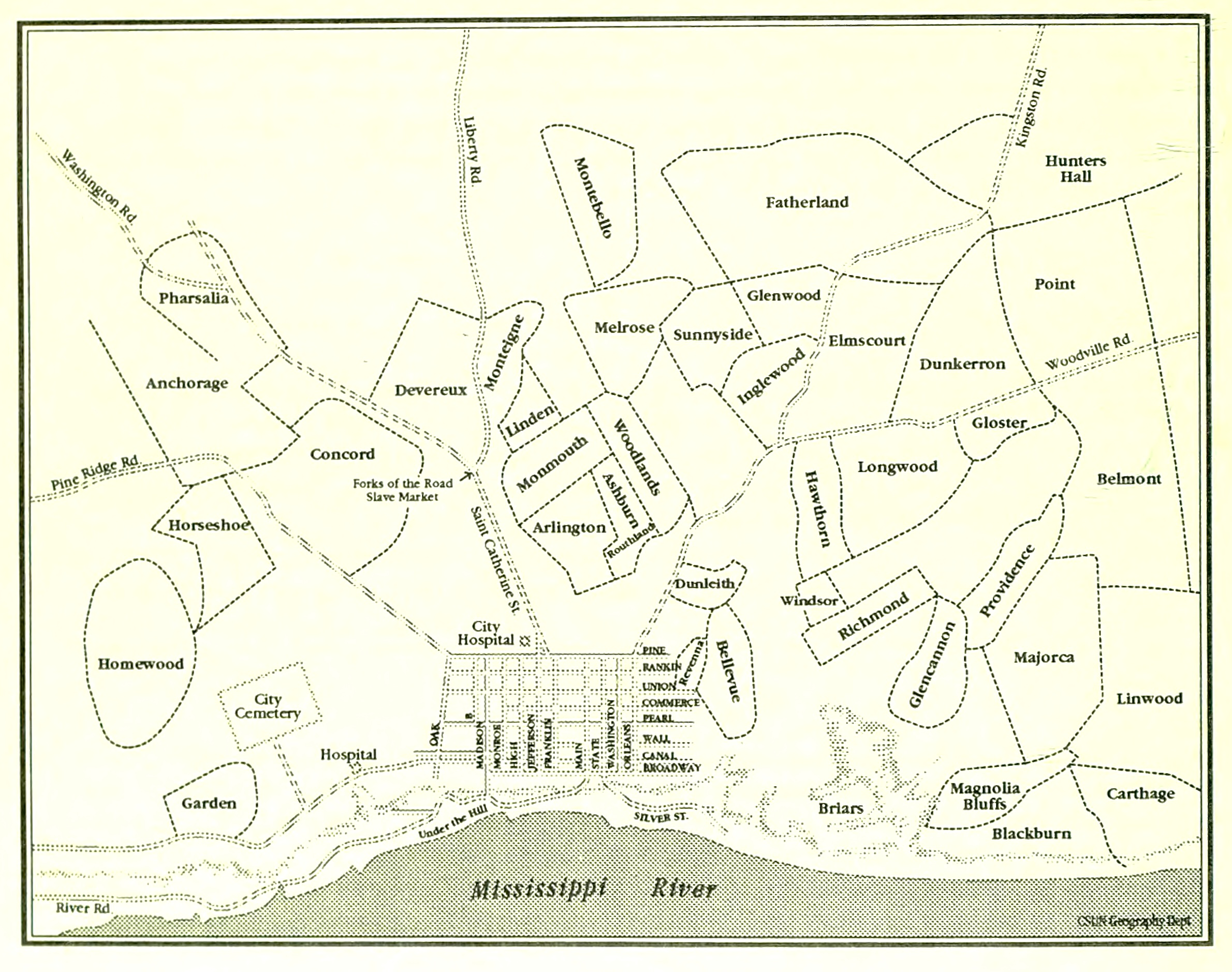
Map of antebellum Natchez showing location of Pharsalia

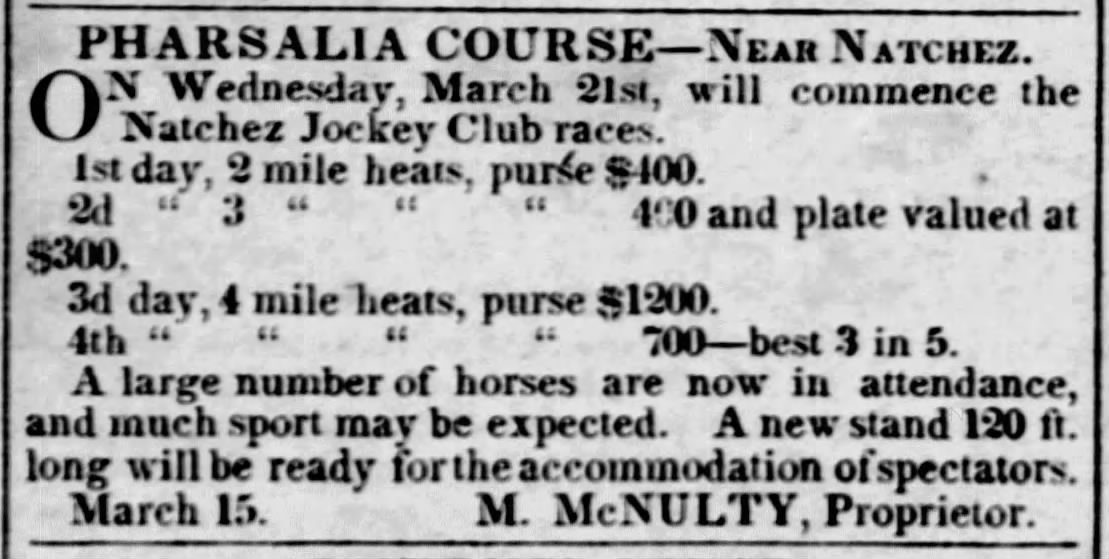
"Pharsalia Course–Near Natchez" (The Semi-Weekly Mississippi Free Trader, March 22, 1838)

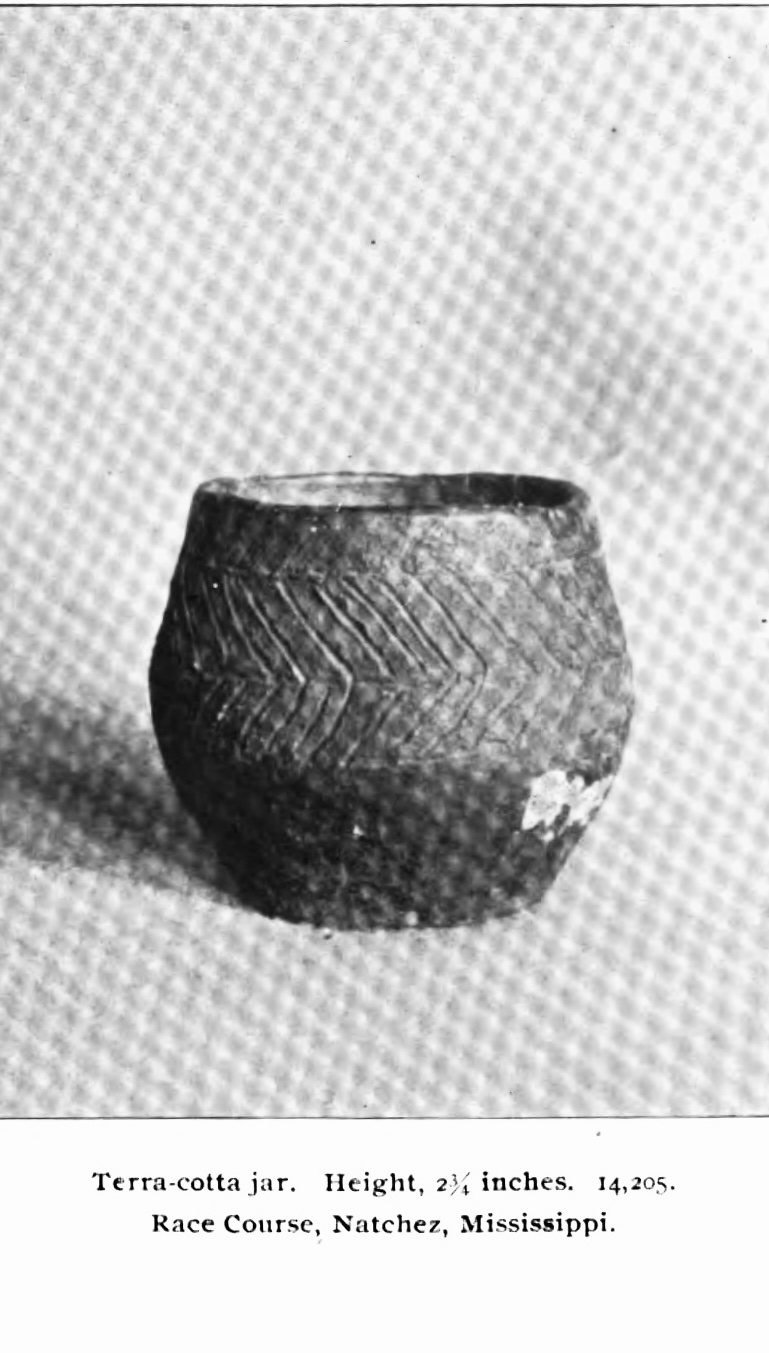
Incised terra cotta pot found at Pharsalia during excavations c. 1837–1844 by Montroville Wilson Dickeson

== See also ==
- The Louisiana Jockey Club
- Metairie Cemetery#Metairie Course
- Eclipse Race Course
- Bascombe Race Course
