= The Mobile Jockey Club =

American sporting organization

Coordinates: 30°40′11.7″N 88°03′56.9″W

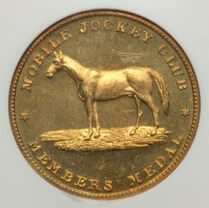
- Founded: 1836
- Headquarters: Mobile, Alabama

The Mobile Jockey Club was an American sporting organization founded prior to 1836 in Mobile, Alabama.

== History ==
=== 1836 ===
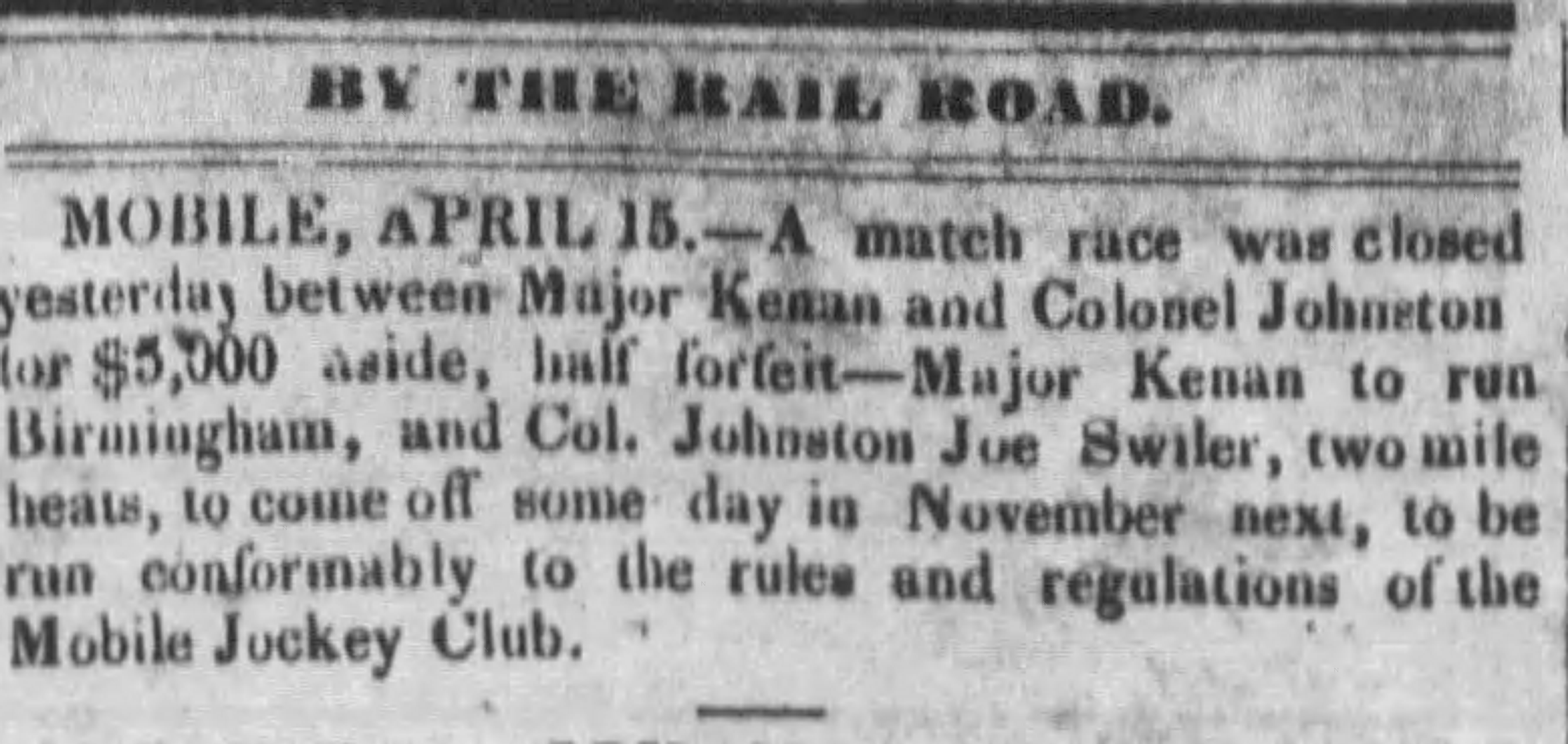
Mobile Jockey Club Spring Races Charleston Courier Tue Apr 26 1836

As early as 1836 Major Kenan's "Birmingham" raced Col. Johnston's "Joe Swiler" for $5,000.

=== 1837 ===
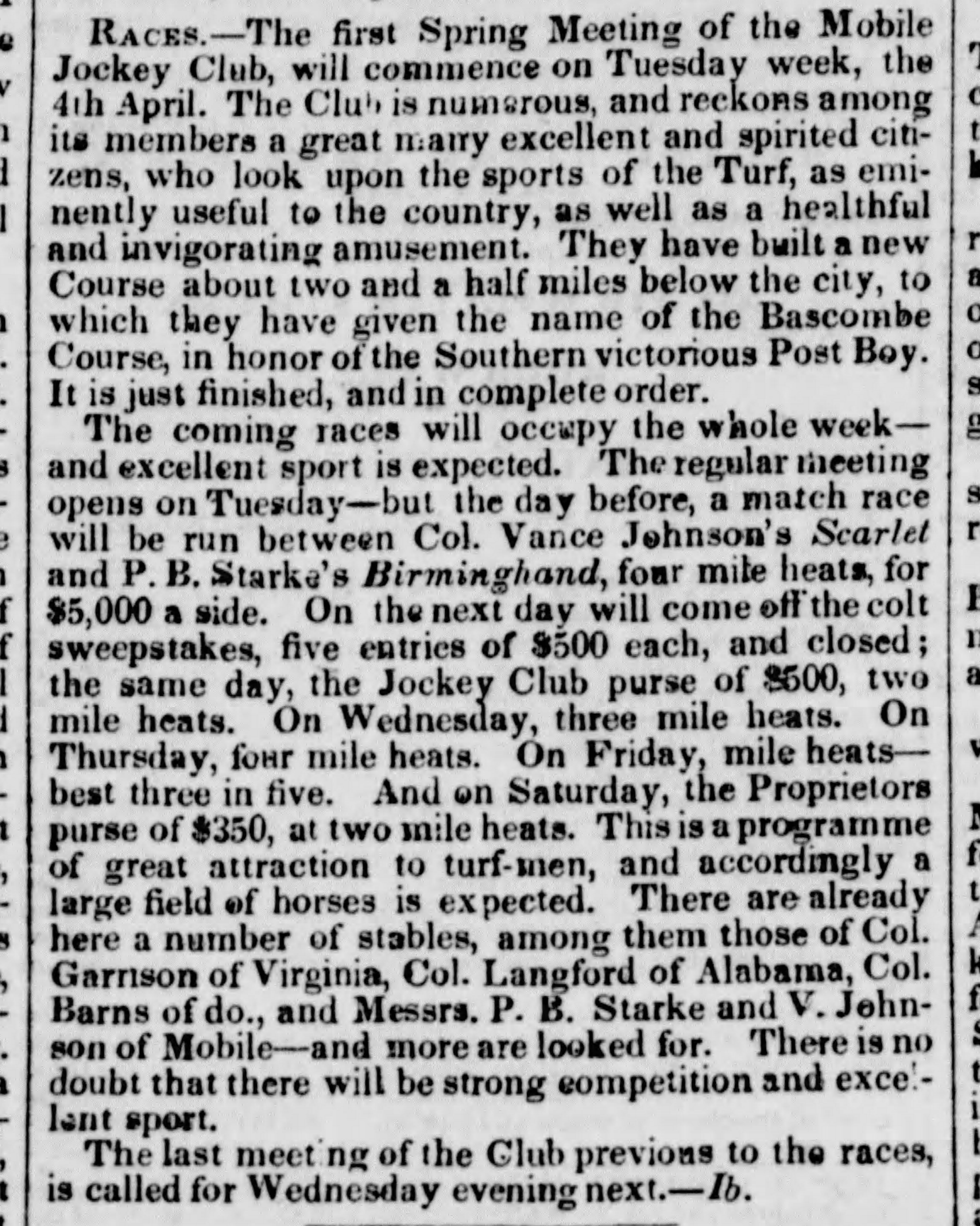
Mobile Jockey Club New York Daily Herald Mon Apr 3 1837

In 1837 the Club built the Bascombe Race Course. The first race was held Monday, April 3, a closed competition between two local Mobilians, Col. Vance Johnson's Scarlet and P. B. Starke's Birminghand, four-mile heats, $5,000 aside. Tuesday featured The Colt Sweepstakes: five entries of $500 each, and closed; that same day the Jockey Club purse of $500, two-mile heats. On Wednesday three mile heats, on Thursday four mile heats, on Friday mile heats, best 3 of 5, and Saturday the Proprietors Purse of $350, at two-mile heats. In attendance were Col. Garrison of Virginia, who would go on to found the Metairie Course in New Orleans, Louisiana with Richard Adams; and Col. Langford of the Canebrake.

=== 1838 ===
The Fall Meeting of The Mobile Jockey Club commenced Tuesday, Nov 27th, with a sweepstakes race for colts and fillies, being 2 years old in the Spring of 1838, $250 Entrance Fee, $100 Forfeit Fee. There were six entries, three forfeited. J. S. Garrison (C. Robinson's) Martha Robins, D. Stephenson's Amazon, and Doctor Wither's Pulaski, raced.

=== 1842 ===
The Fall Meeting began Wednesday, Dec 14, with the Jockey Club Purse, two mile heats, $250, and a sweepstakes race for four year olds, two mile heats, $300 entrance fee, $100 forfeit fee, to name and close the Dec. 1, three or more to make a race. Thursday, Dec 15, Jockey Club Purse, three mile heats, $400. Friday, Dec 16, Jockey Club Purse, four mile heats, $700, of which $100 goes to the second best horse. Saturday, Dec 17, Mile Heats, best three in five, Purse $200, and a Sweepstakes race for three year olds, mile heats, $200 entrance fee, $100 forfeit fee, three or more to make a race, to name and close the Dec. 1. D STEPHENSON Proprietor.

=== 1848 ===
There is a note in the Times Picayune announcing the Spring Races to begin March 8, with an allusion to a newly elected board of governors. This is when Richard Ten Broeck, proprietor of the Metairie Course in New Orleans, became involved in The Mobile Jockey Club as its Treasurer.

== Gallery ==
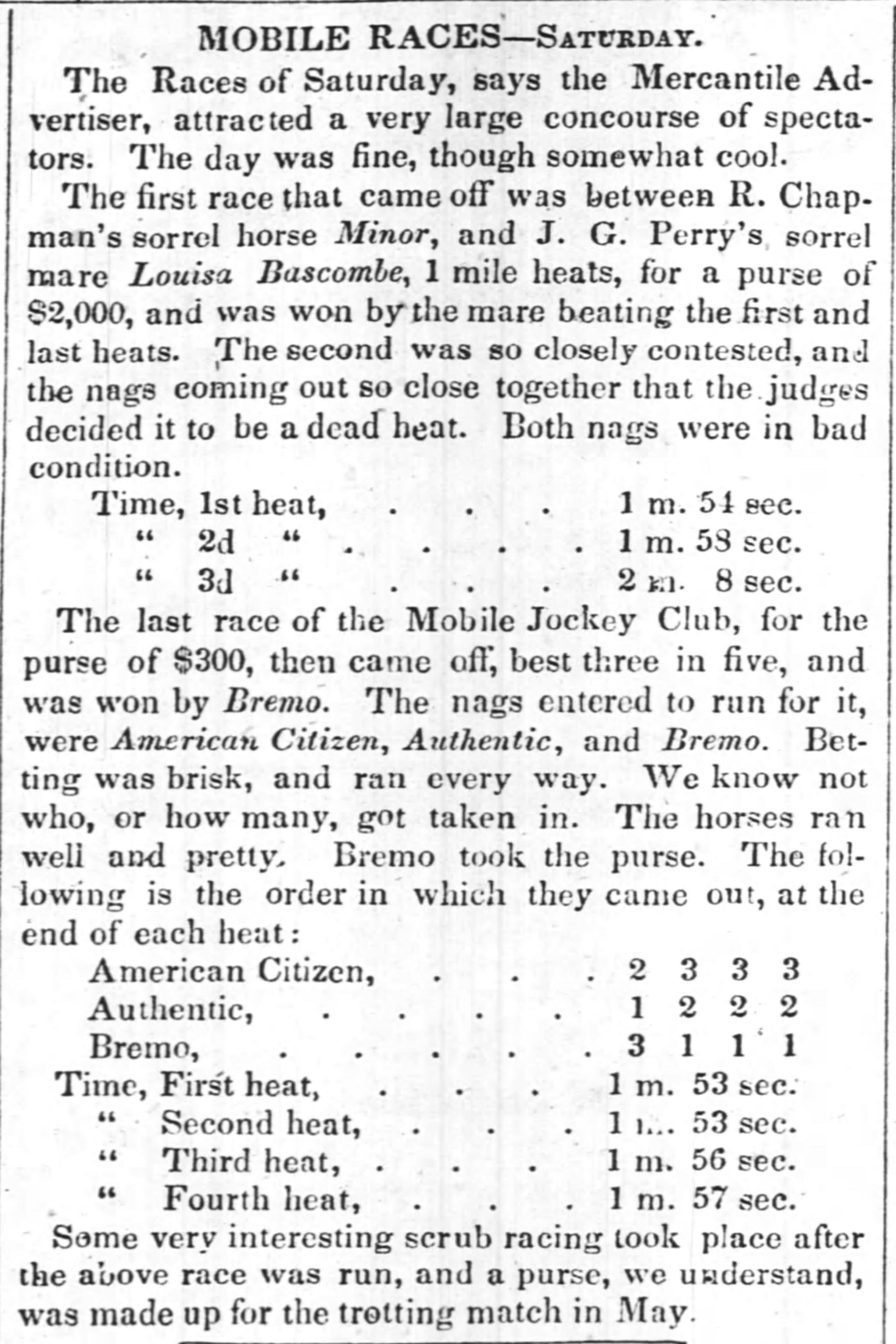
Mobile Jockey Club Bascombe Race Course Spring Races 1837 The Times Picayune Thu Apr 13 1837

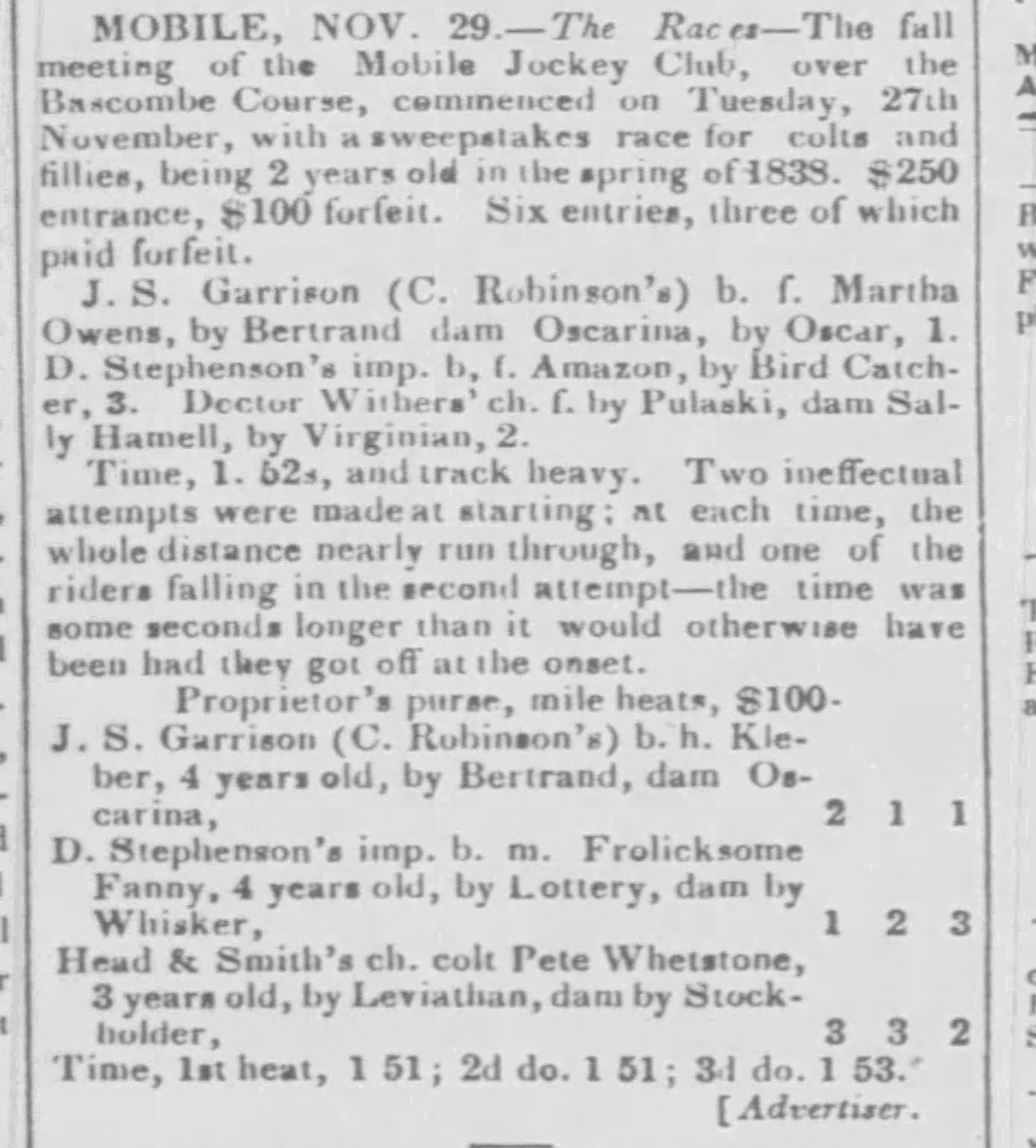
Mobile Jockey Club Bascombe Race Course Fall Meeting Charleston Courier Wed Dec 5 1838

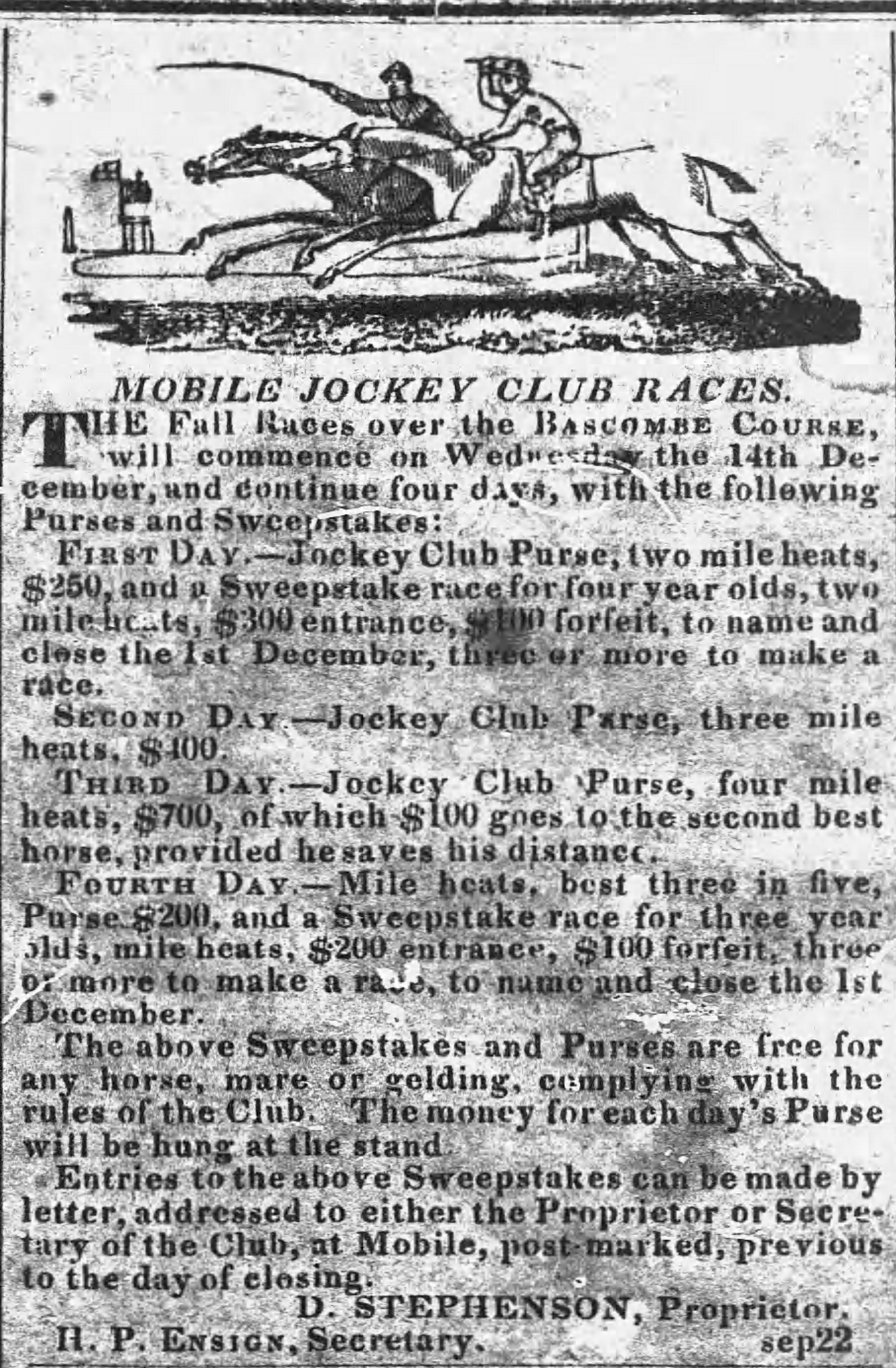
The Mobile Jockey Club Bascombe Race Course Fall Races Mobile Daily Advertiser and Chronicle Thu Oct 13 1842

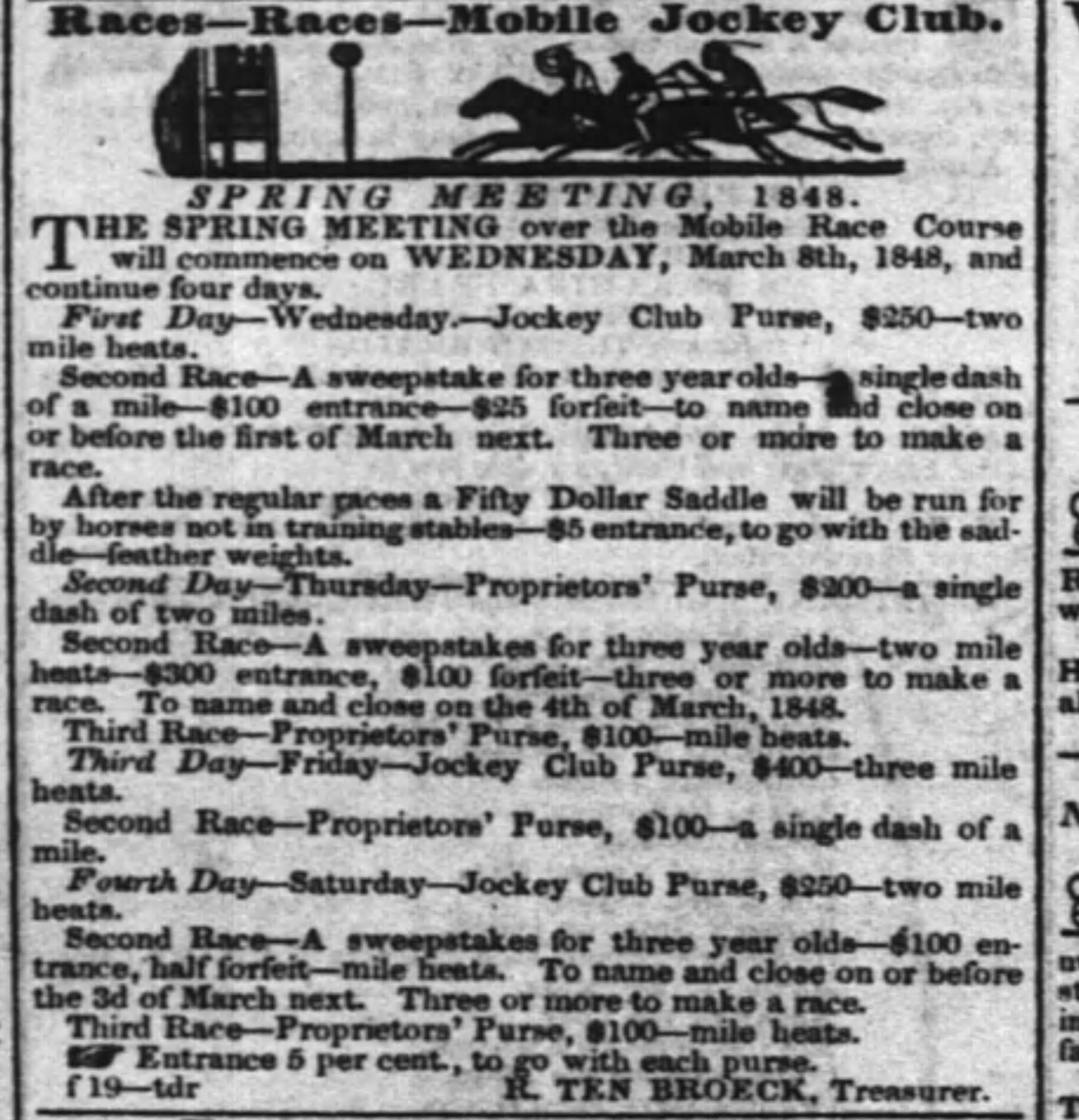
Spring Meeting of the Mobile Jockey Club 1848 The Times Picayune Thu Mar 9 1848

== Notable members ==
- Samuel S. Brown

== See also ==
- Bascombe Race Course
- Eclipse Race Course
- Metairie Race Course
- The Louisiana Jockey Club
