= Bascombe Race Course =

Thoroughbred racetrack in Mobile, Alabama

- Interactive map of Bascombe Race Course
- Location: Mobile, Alabama
- Coordinates: 30°40′08.4″N 88°3′56.5″W
- Date opened: 1836
- Course type: Flat/Thoroughbred

The Bascombe Race Course is a former thoroughbred horseracing track in Mobile, Alabama, built in 1836 that hosted The Mobile Jockey Club.

== History ==
=== Spring 1837 ===
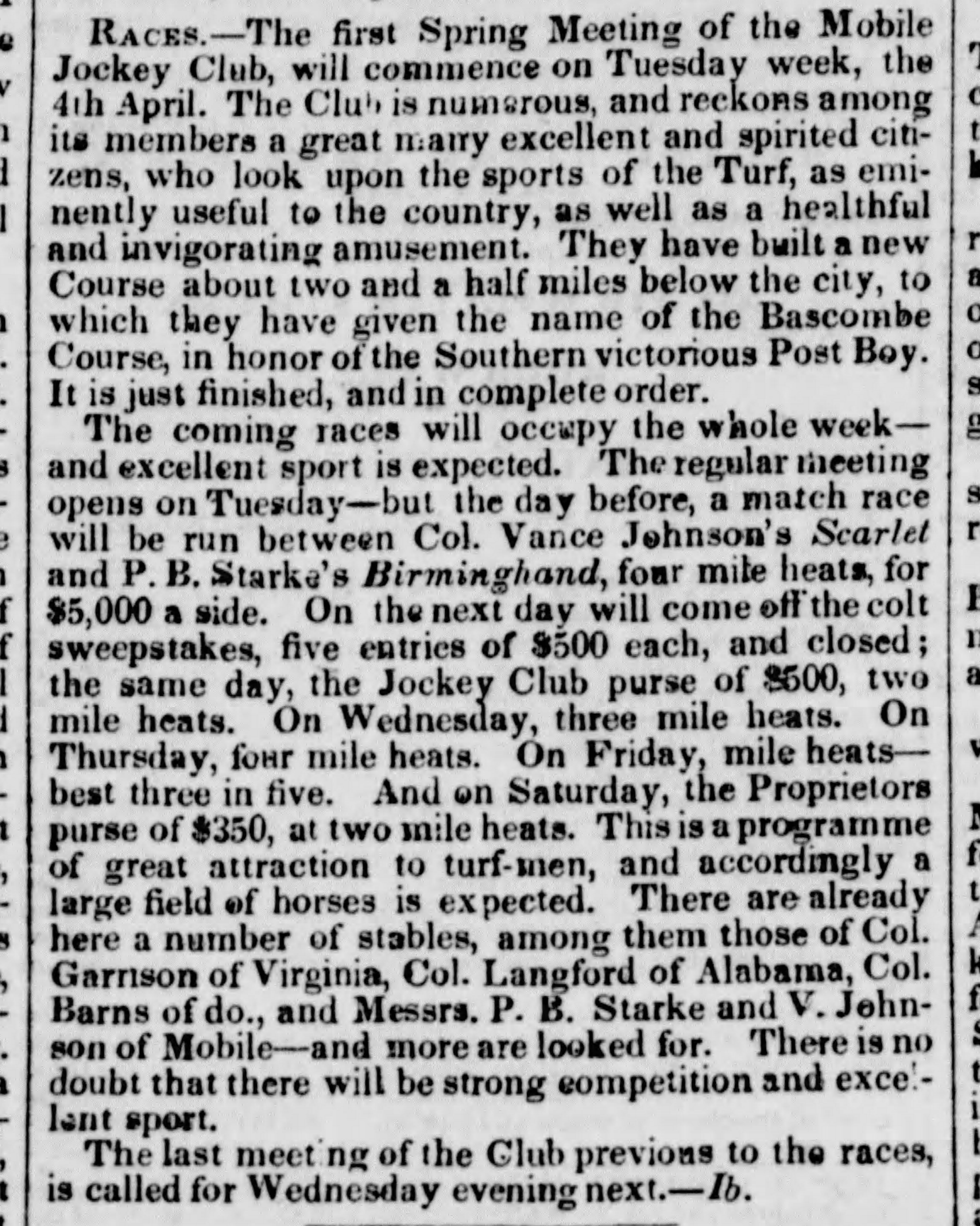
Mobile Jockey Club New York Daily Herald Mon Apr 3 1837

The Race Course is completed. On Tuesday, March 13th, 1838 races were held, secretary F.K. West. The First Day's Race was a Sweepstakes for colts and fillies, 3 years old, $300 Entrance Fee, $150 Forfeit Fee, four entries, closed. Local Vance Johnson's Melzare, David Stevenson's Frolicsome Fanny, Henry A. Tayloe's Black Maria, and James S. Garrison's Wagner. Day Two Jockey Club Purse, Two Mile Heats, purse $500. Day Three Jockey Club Purse $700, Three Mile Heats. Fourth Day Jockey Club Purse $1000, Four Mile Heats. Fifth Day The Proprietors Purse followed by The Jockey Club Purse, both $300. Results: J.S. Garrison's Charles Magic, beat D. Stephenson's Oseola in the Proprietor's Purse. Henry A. Tayloe's Hortense, beat J.S. Garrison's Pollard, and D. Stephenson's Frolicsome Fanny.

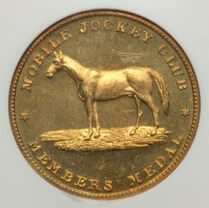
Mobile Jockey Club Token Mobile, Alabama 1853

The Mobile Jockey Club announce their races to be held beginning Tuesday, April 4, a special race was held between Col. Vance Johnson's Scarlet and P. B. Starke's Birminghand, four-mile heats, $5,000 aside, the day before. Tuesday featured The Colt Sweepstakes: five entries of $500 each, and closed; that same day the Jockey Club purse of $500, two-mile heats. On Wednesday three mile heats, on Thursday four mile heats, on Friday mile heats, best 3 of 5, and Saturday the Proprietors Purse of $350, at two-mile heats. In attendance were Col. Garrison of Virginia, who would go on to found the Metairie Course in New Orleans, Louisiana with Richard Adams; and Col. Langford of the Canebrake.

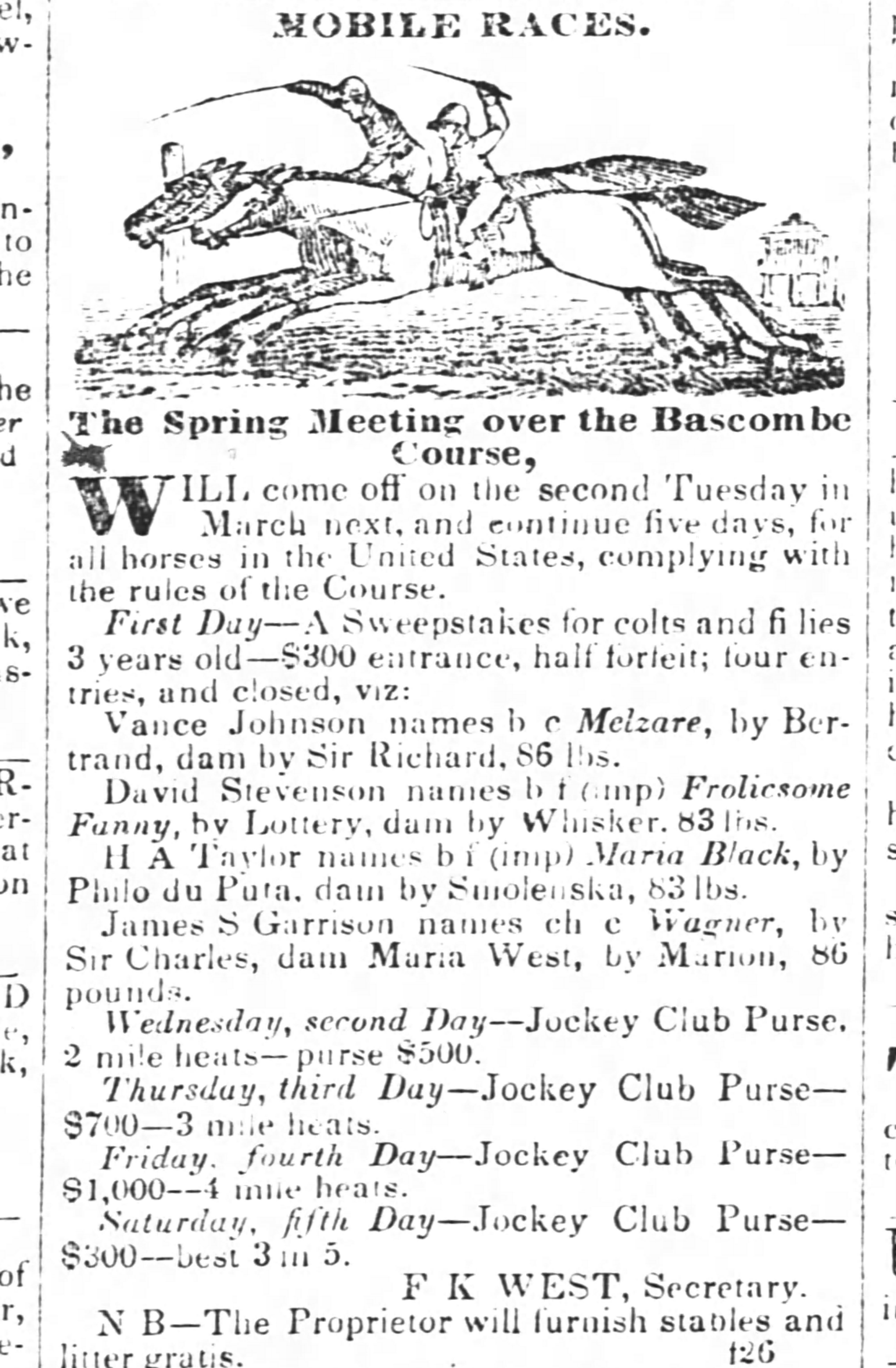
Bascombe Race Course Spring Races March 1838

=== Fall 1838 ===
The Fall Meeting of The Mobile Jockey Club commenced Tuesday, Nov 27th, with a sweepstakes race for colts and fillies, being 2 years old in the Spring of 1838, $250 Entrance Fee, $100 Forfeit Fee. There were six entries, three forfeited. J. S. Garrison (C. Robinson's) Martha Robins, D. Stephenson's Amazon, and Doctor Wither's Pulaski, raced.

=== Fall 1842 ===
The Fall Meeting of The Mobile Jockey Club began Wednesday, Dec 14, with the Jockey Club Purse, two mile heats, $250, and a sweepstakes race for four year olds, two mile heats, $300 Entrance Fee, $100 Forfeit Fee, to name and close the Dec. 1, three or more to make a race. Thursday, Dec 15, Jockey Club Purse, three mile heats, $400. Friday, Dec 16, Jockey Club Purse, four mile heats, $700, of which $100 goes to the second best horse. Saturday, Dec 17, Mile Heats, best three in five, Purse $200, and a Sweepstakes race for three year olds, mile heats, $200 Entrance Fee, $100 Forfeit Fee, three or more to make a race, to name and close Dec. 14th.

== Gallery ==
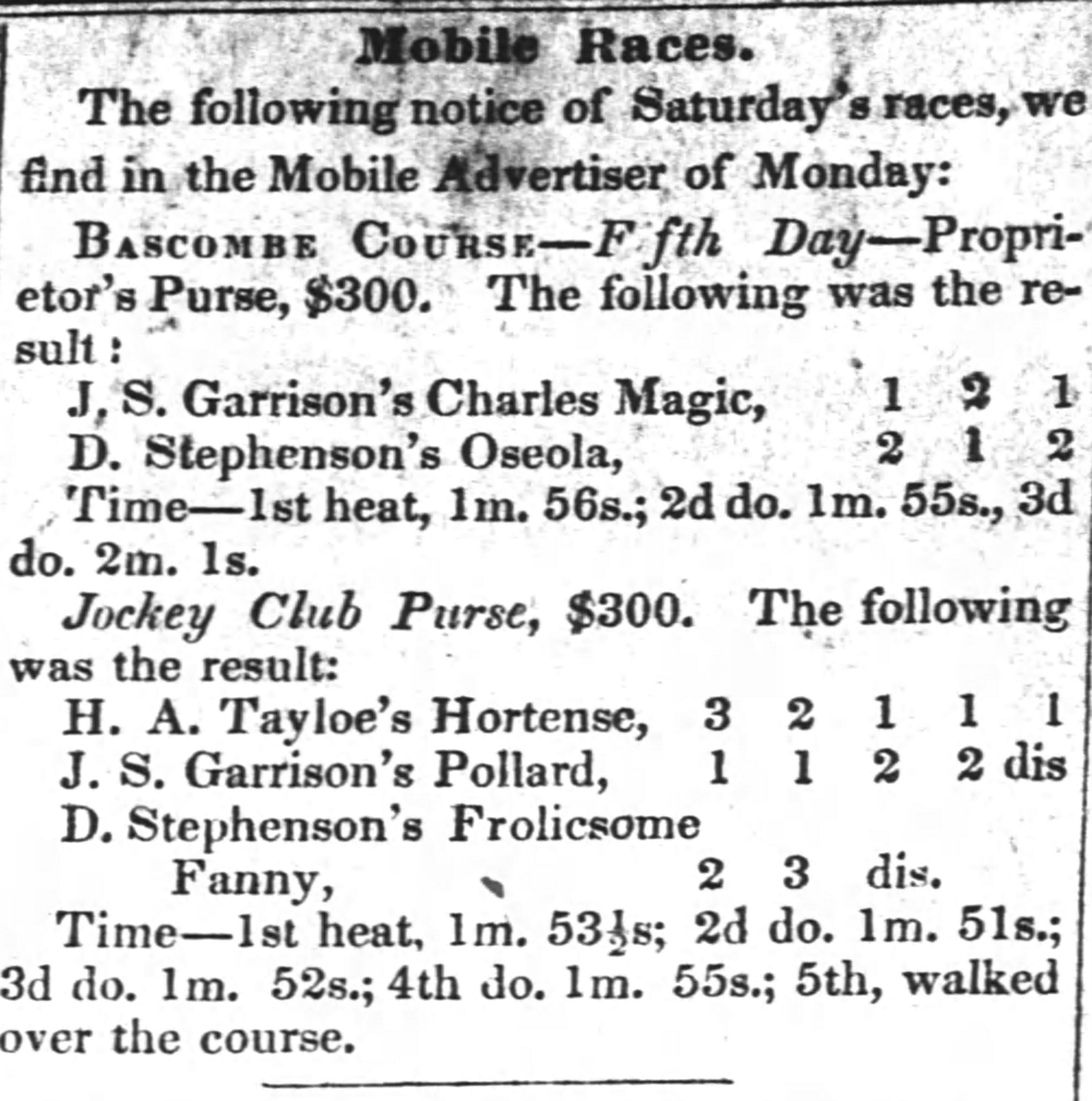
The Bascombe Race Course The Times Picayune Wed Mar 21 1838

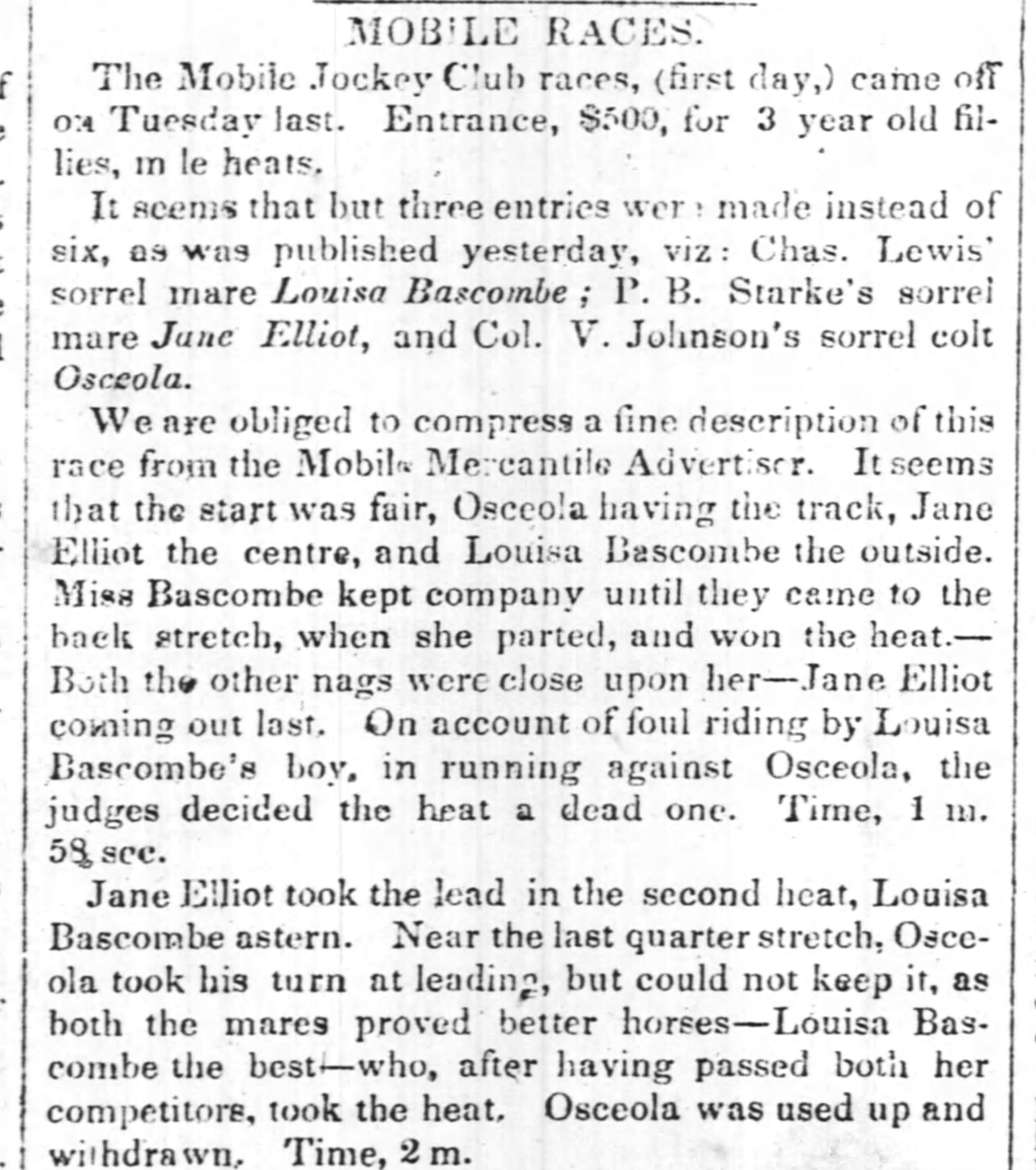
Mobile Jockey Club Bascombe Race Course The Times Picayune Fri Apr 7 1837

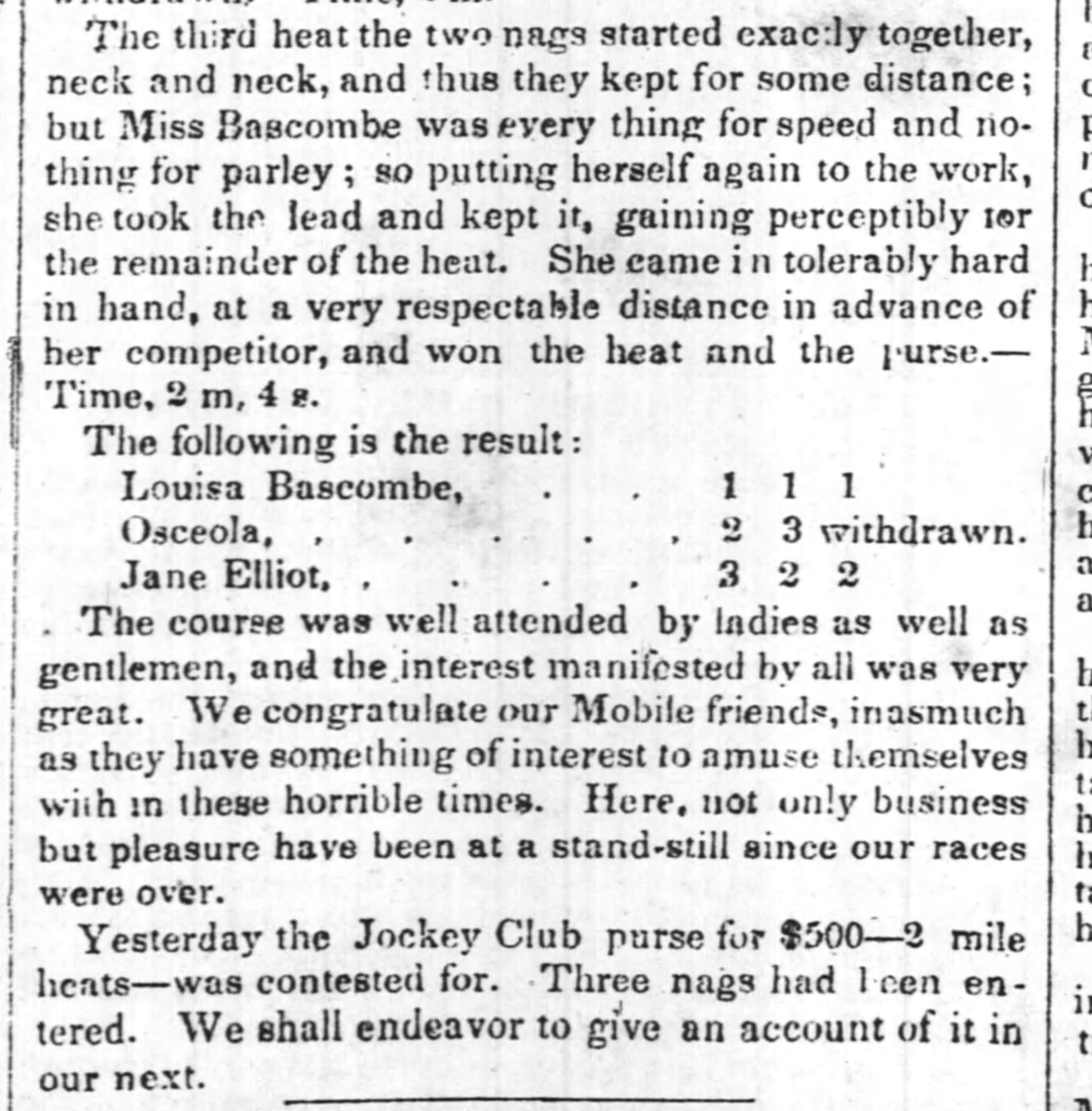
Mobile Jockey Club Bascombe Race Course The Times Picayune Fri Apr 7 1837

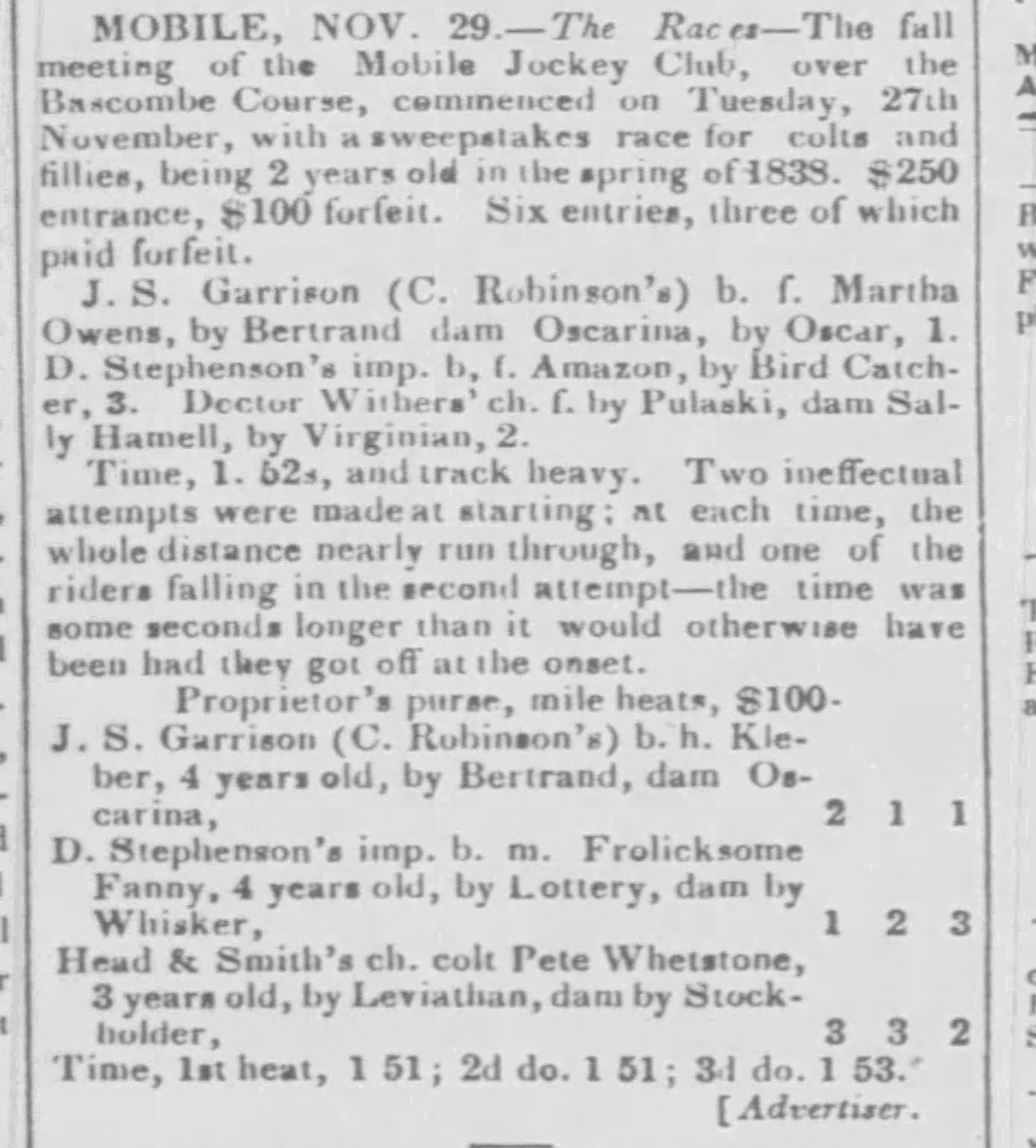
Mobile Jockey Club Bascombe Race Course Fall Meeting Charleston Courier Wed Dec 5 1838

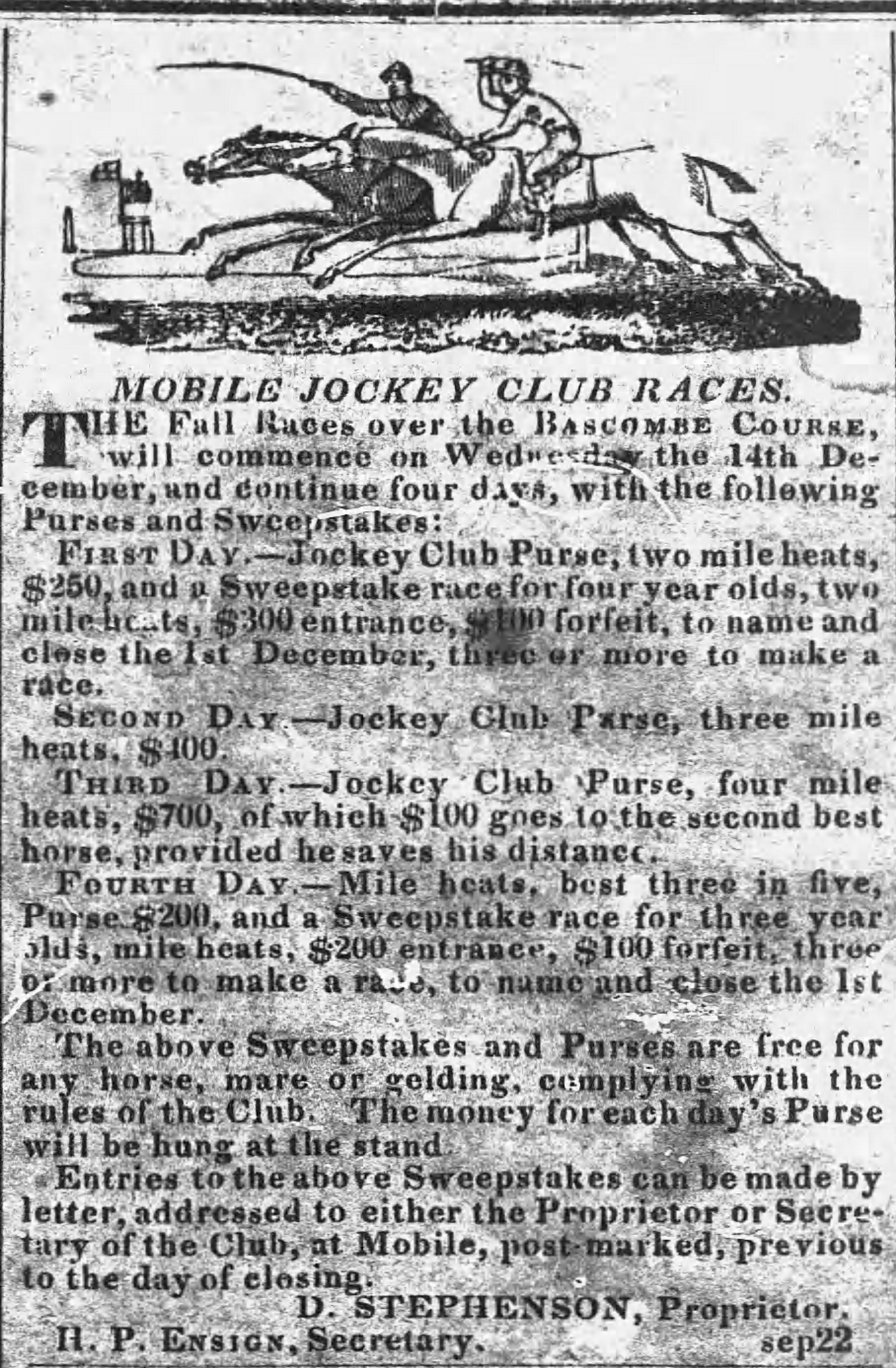
The Mobile Jockey Club Bascombe Race Course Fall Races Mobile Daily Advertiser and Chronicle Thu Oct 13 1842

== See also ==
- Eclipse Race Course
- Metairie Course
- The Louisiana Jockey Club
