= Louisiana Jockey Club =

American sporting organization

The Louisiana Jockey Club
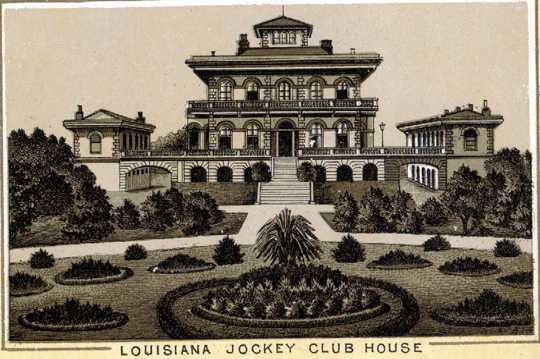
- The Louisiana Jockey Club, formerly The Luling Mansion (b.1865)
- Founded: 1837
- Founders: Bernard de Marigny, Henry A. Tayloe, Julius C. Branch
- Headquarters: New Orleans, Louisiana. 29.983050°N 90.081347°W

The Louisiana Jockey Club was an American sporting association founded in 1831 at the Jackson Race Course. It was active again with the completion and opening of the Carrollton Race Course, and planning, financing and construction of the Fair Grounds Race Course, their home track, in New Orleans, Louisiana. Today what was originally known as the Louisiana Race Course is the oldest operating site of horse racing in America and only remaining Thoroughbred Race Course of the old-line tracks, the others which have closed are the Metairie Race Course (Metairie Jockey Club), the Eclipse Race Course (The New Orleans Jockey Club), and the Jackson Race Course; it exists today as the Fair Grounds Race Course, where races are still held-making it the oldest continuous racing track in operation in the United States, after the Freehold Raceway closed in 2024, and before the Saratoga Race Course.

== History ==
=== 1831 ===
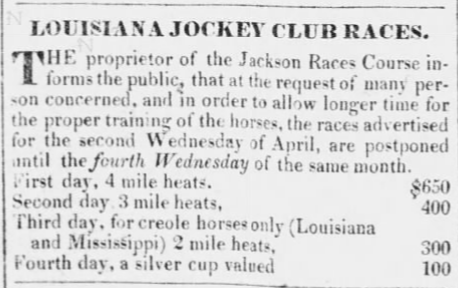
Louisiana Jockey Club Races, The Weekly Natchez Courier Sat, Mar 26, 1831 ·Page 6

=== 1837 ===
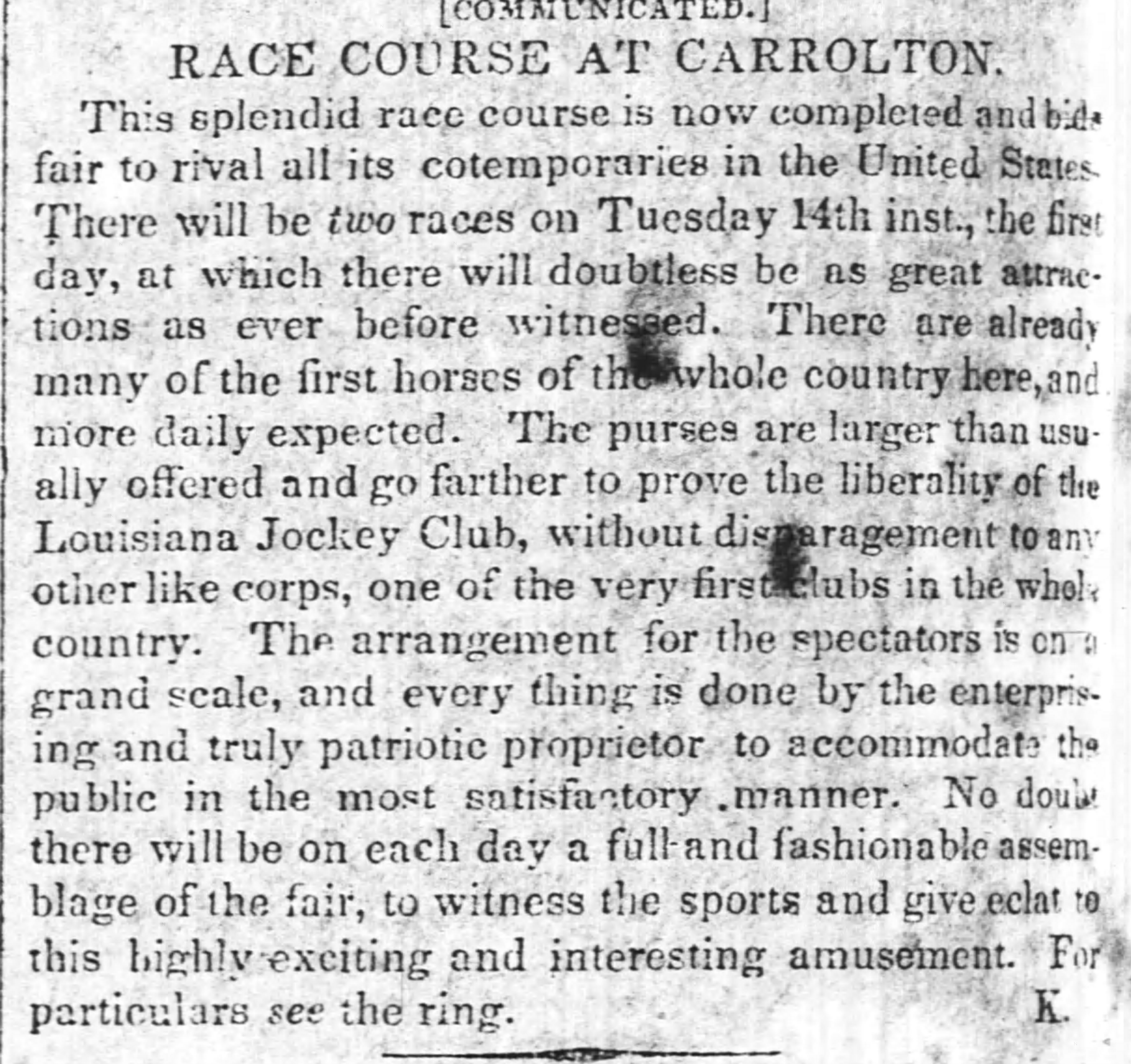
Carrollton Race Course Announcement The Times-Picayune 12 Mar 1837, Wed

An announcement dated March 12, 1837, in The Picayune exclaims the completion of the Carrollton Race Course. Two races were held on Tuesday, March 14, 1837. On Friday, March 17, 1837, the Louisiana Jockey Club sponsored the Purse for the fourth day of racing during the first meeting of The New Orleans Jockey Club.

=== 1838 ===
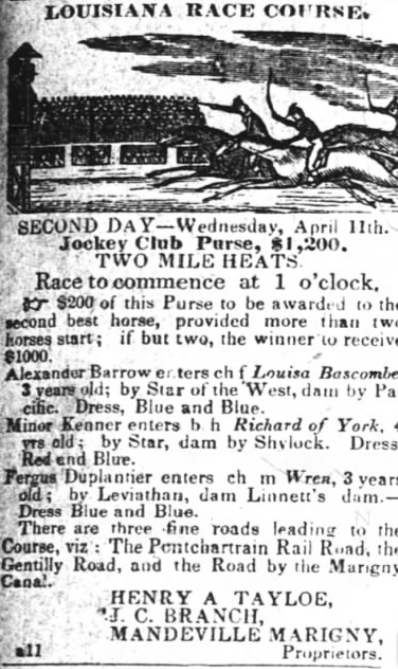
Louisiana Race Course 1838 Spring Meeting

Proprietors Dr. Julius C Branch, a Virginia Native, and University of Pennsylvania Medical School graduate; local French-Creole American nobleman, playboy, planter, politician, duelist, writer, horse breeder, land developer, and President of the Louisiana State Senate Bernard de Marigny; and Virginia, Tidewater, scion, Henry A. Tayloe; whose father John Tayloe III of The Octagon was the leader on American Turf, imported the first Epsom Derby winner Diomed, and bred the Foundational American Sire Sir Archy at his stud farm Mount Airy.

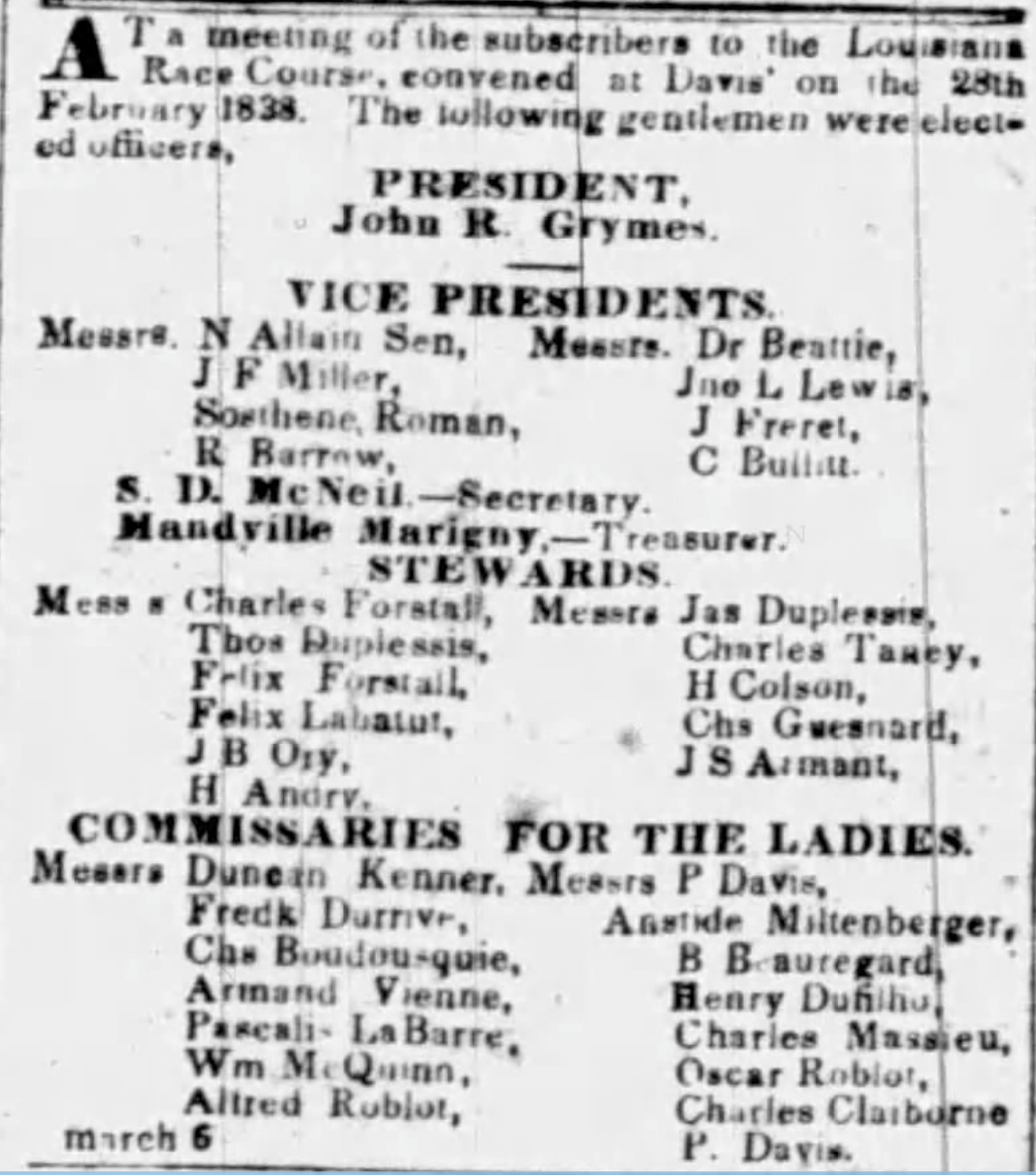
Louisiana Jockey Club Subscribers Meeting

Subscribers were organized by John Randolph Grymes, President (cousin of Henry Tayloe), Vice Presidents: N. Allian Sen, J.F. Miller, Sosthene Roman (Oak Alley Plantation), Robert Ruffin Barrow, Dr. Beattie, John L. Lewis (politician), J. Freret (father of James Freret), and Cuthbert Bullitt. S. D. McNeil was the Secretary and Proprietor Bernard de Marigny (Marigny de Mandiville) was the Treasurer. Stewards included: Charles Forstall, Thomas Duplessis, Felix Forstall, Felix Labatut, Jean Baptiste Ory, H. Andry, Jas. Duplessis, Charles Taney, H. Colson, Charles Guesnard, and Jean Seraphim Armant. Commissaries for the Ladies: Duncan Kenner, Frederick Durrive, Charles Boudousquie, Armand Vienne, Pascalis de la Barre, William McQuinn, Alfred Roblot, Pierre Davis, Aristide Miltenberger, B Beauregard, Henri Dufilho, Charles Massieu, Oscar Roblot, and Charles W. W. Claiborne (son of William C. C. Claiborne.

==== Spring Races ====
===== First Day =====
The First Race was the Creole Purse $1,000, Mile Heats, run between Sosthene Allian's Tresorrier, John R. Miller's Lord of the Isles, Robert J. Barrow's Tom Jones, Fergus Duplanitier Louisianese, and Y.N. Oliver's Pochahontas. The Second Race, $250 Purse, Mile Heats, run between: Sosthene Allain's Lavinia, Fergus Duplantier's Britannia, Thomas J. Well's Taglioni, Henry A. Tayloe's Tom Thurman, and John F. Miller's Orange Bay.

===== Second Day =====
Jockey Club Purse $1,200, Two Mile Heats, run between Alexander Barrow's Louisa Bascombe, Minor Kenner's Richard of York, Fergus Duplantier Wren.

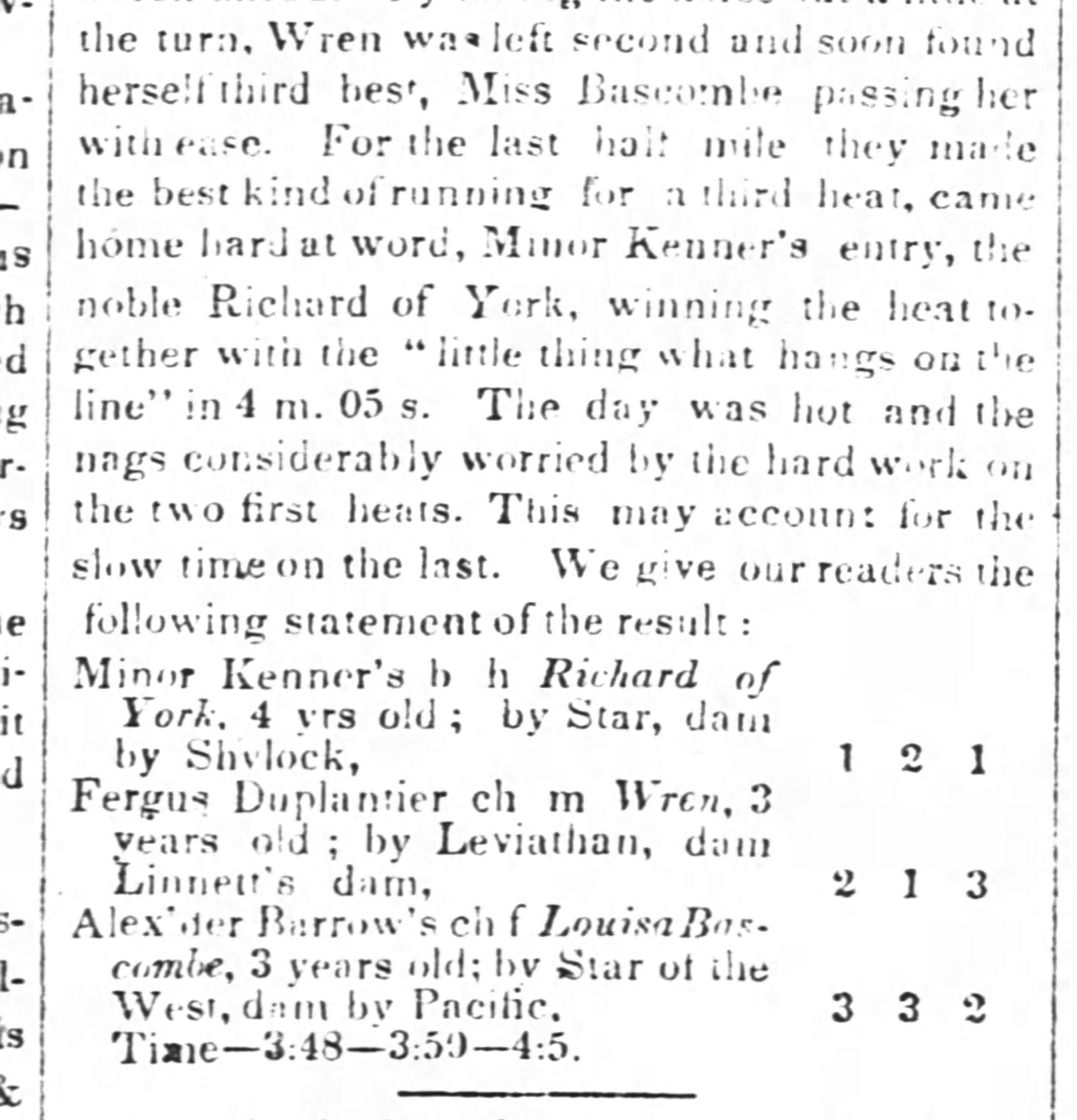
Day 2 Results Spring Meeting Louisiana Jockey Club The Times Picayune Thu Apr 12 1838 (2)

==== 1874 ====
The club admitted black spectators to the public stretch, but barred them from the last quarter.

== Gallery ==
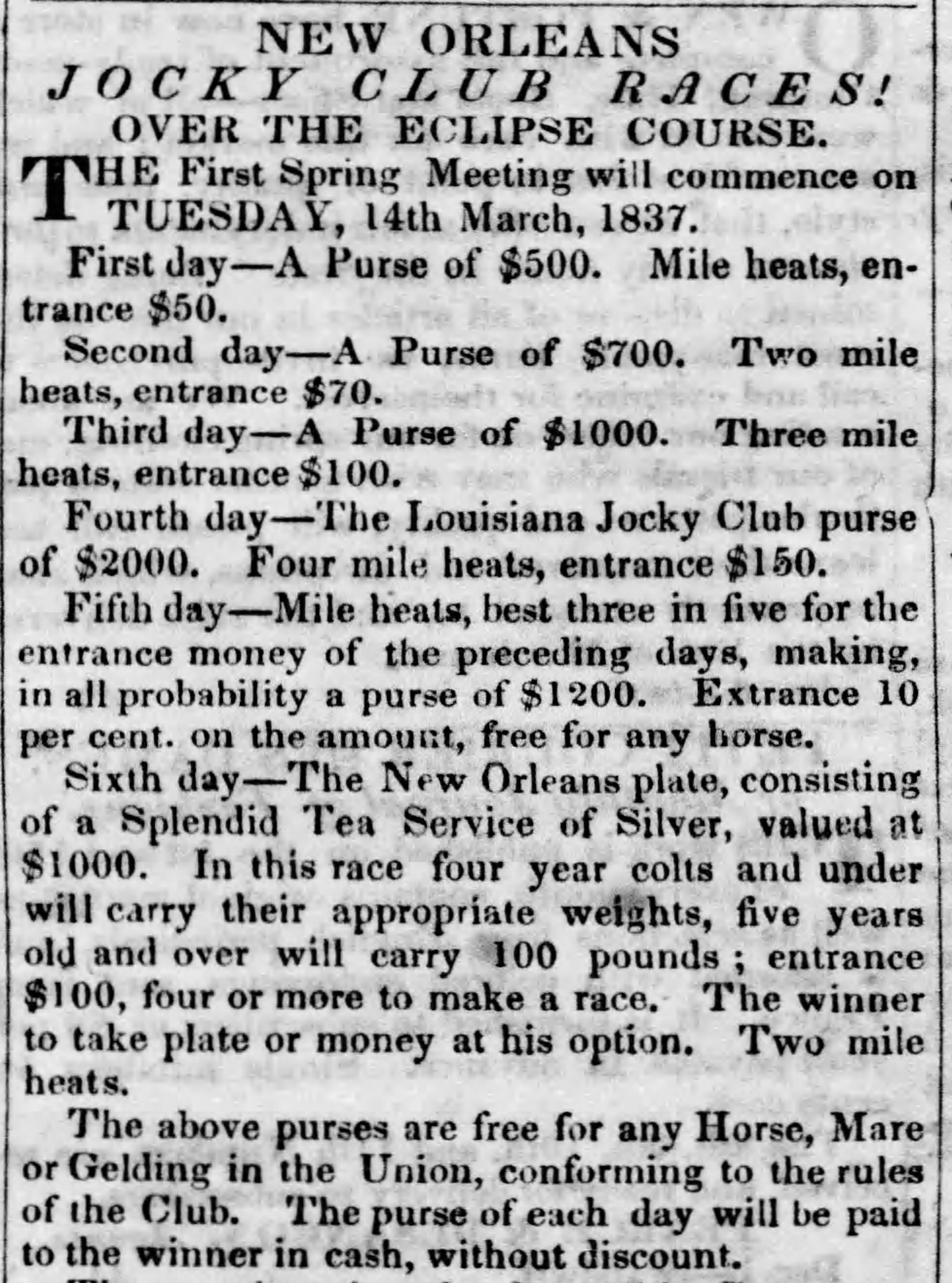
The Louisiana Jockey Club Purse at the Eclipse Race Course during the spring meeting of The New Orleans Jockey Club.

== See also ==
- Fair Grounds Race Course
- The Mobile Jockey Club
- The New Orleans Jockey Club
- The Boston Club
