= Eclipse Race Course =

Thoroughbred racetrack in New Orleans

- Location: New Orleans, Louisiana
- Owned by: Captain Yelverton Oliver
- Date opened: 1837
- Course type: Flat/Thoroughbred

The Eclipse Race Course was the third formal thoroughbred horse racing track in New Orleans, Louisiana, founded in 1837 by Captain Yelverton Oliver, who owned the famous thoroughbred Richard of York; a native Virginian, who organized The New Orleans Jockey Club.

== History ==
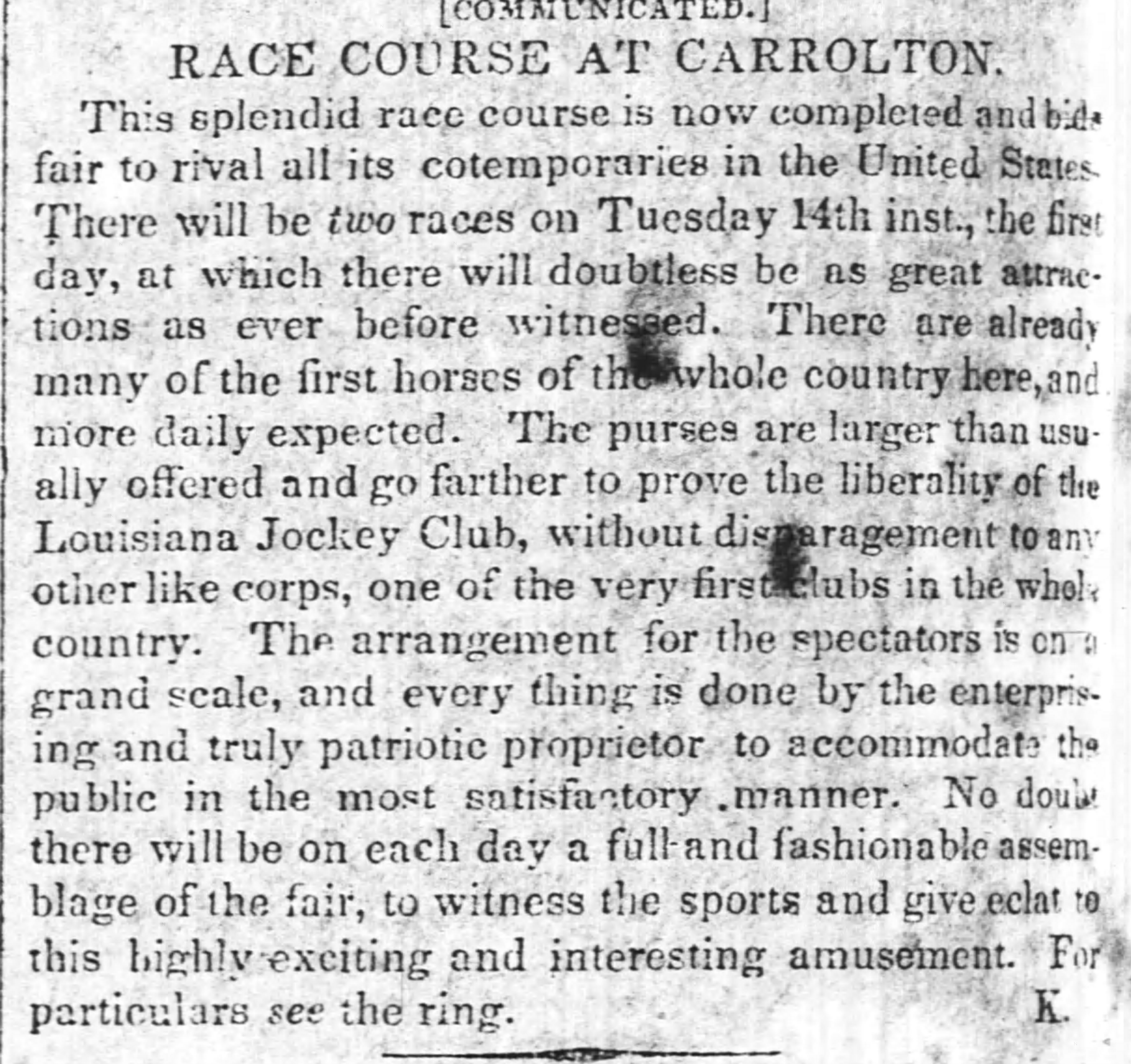
Carrolton Race Course Announcement The Times-Picayune 12 Mar 1837, Wed

The first race course in New Orleans as laid out in 1820 by Francois Livaudais on his Live Oak Plantation, near the intersection of St. Charles and Washington Avenues. Then followed the Jackson Course in 1825, established a few miles below the city. An announcement dated March 12, 1837, in The Picayune exclaims completion of the Carrollton Race Course. On Tuesday, March 14, two races were held. On Friday, March 17, 1837, The Louisiana Jockey Club sponsored the Purse for the fourth day of racing at the Eclipse Race Course hosted by The New Orleans Jockey Club.

The New Orleans Jockey Club announced its Spring Race Schedule at the Eclipse Race Course on January 17 in the Mississippi Free Trader Newspaper, then in New Orleans on Jan 31, 1837 in the Times Picayune Newspaper. The proprietor was Virginia emigrant Captain Yelverton Oliver who would later go on to purchase Oakland Race Course in Louisville, Kentucky.

=== 1837 ===
The Spring Meeting of The New Orleans Jockey Club began Tuesday, March 14. The First Day consisted of the Jockey Club Purse of $500, One Mile Heats, Entrance Fee $50. The Second Day, Jockey Club Purse of $700, Two Mile Heats, $70 Entrance Fee. The Third Day, Jockey Club Purse of $1,000, Three Mile Heats, Entrance Fee $100. The Fourth Day, The Louisiana Jockey Club Purse of $2,000, Four Mile Heats, Entrance Fee $150. The Fifth Day, Mile Heats, best three in five for the entrance money of the preceding days, $1,200, Entrance Fee 10%, free for any horse. The Sixth Day, The New Orleans Plate, consisting of Silver Tea Service valued at $1,000.

=== 1838 ===
The Fall meeting of the New Orleans Jockey Club began Tuesday, Dec 4th, with the Jockey Club Purse, $1,500. three mile heats. Results: Henry A. Tayloe's Zelina, 5 y.o. by Leviathan beat Thomas W. Chinn's Brown Elk. On the Second Day of racing, Friday, Dec 7th, Jockey Club Purse $1,200, two-mile heats. Results: W. J. Minor's Britannia, beat Minor Kenner's The Jewess, a descendant of Sir Archy, and Sosthene Allain's Wren by Leviathan. Day Three, Saturday, Dec 8th, Jockey Club Purse, $2,500, four-mile heats. Results: J. S. Garrison's, proprietor, Wagner, defeats A.L. Bingaman's Sarah Bladen by Leviathan. The Fourth Day, Sunday, Dec 9th, Jockey Club Purse, $1,000, two-mile heats. Results: Henry A. Tayloe's Zelina beats Thomas J. Wells' Linnet by Leviathan, W.J. Minor's (John Ruth's) Marchesa and Minor Kenner's Richard of York. On the Fifth Day, Monday, Dec 10, Proprietors Purse, $600, 1 Mile Heats, best 3 in 5. Results: W.J. Minor's Telie Doe beat J.S. Garrison's Kleber, and William R. & B.H Barrow's Dick Haile.

== Gallery ==
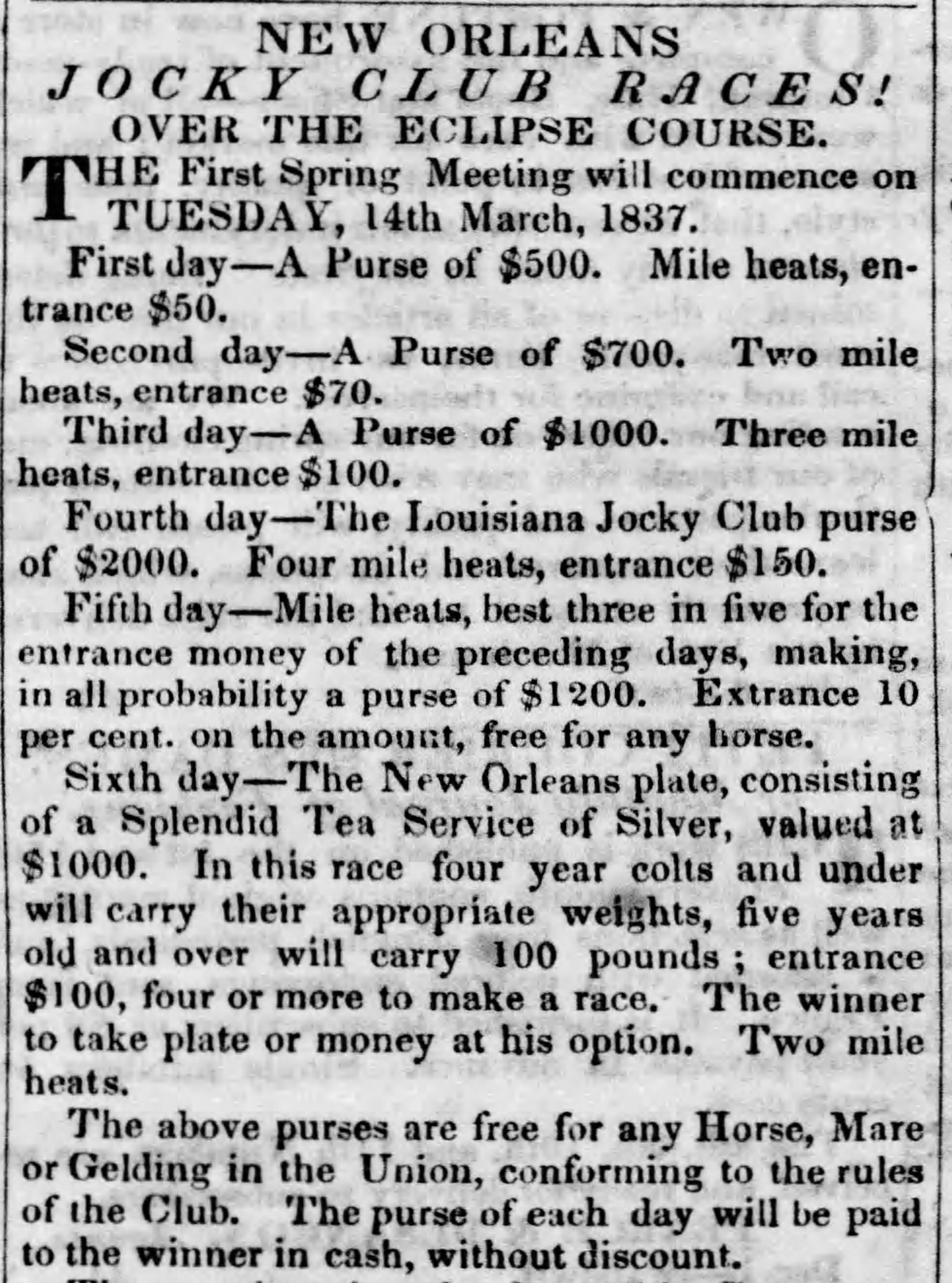
Eclipse Race Course Announcement The Mississippi Free Trader Tue Jan 17 1837

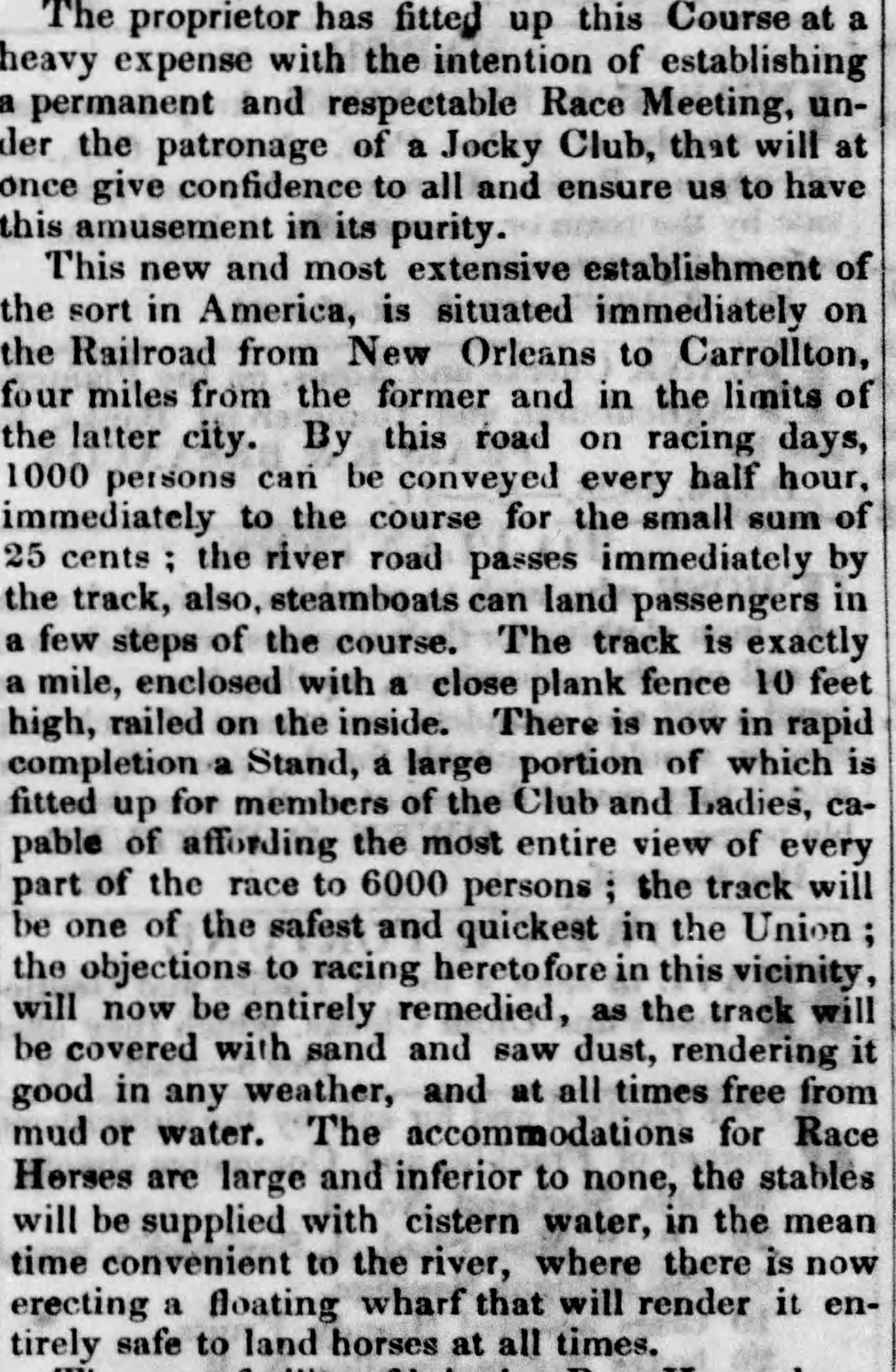
Eclipse Race Course Announcement The Mississippi Free Trader Tue Jan 17 1837

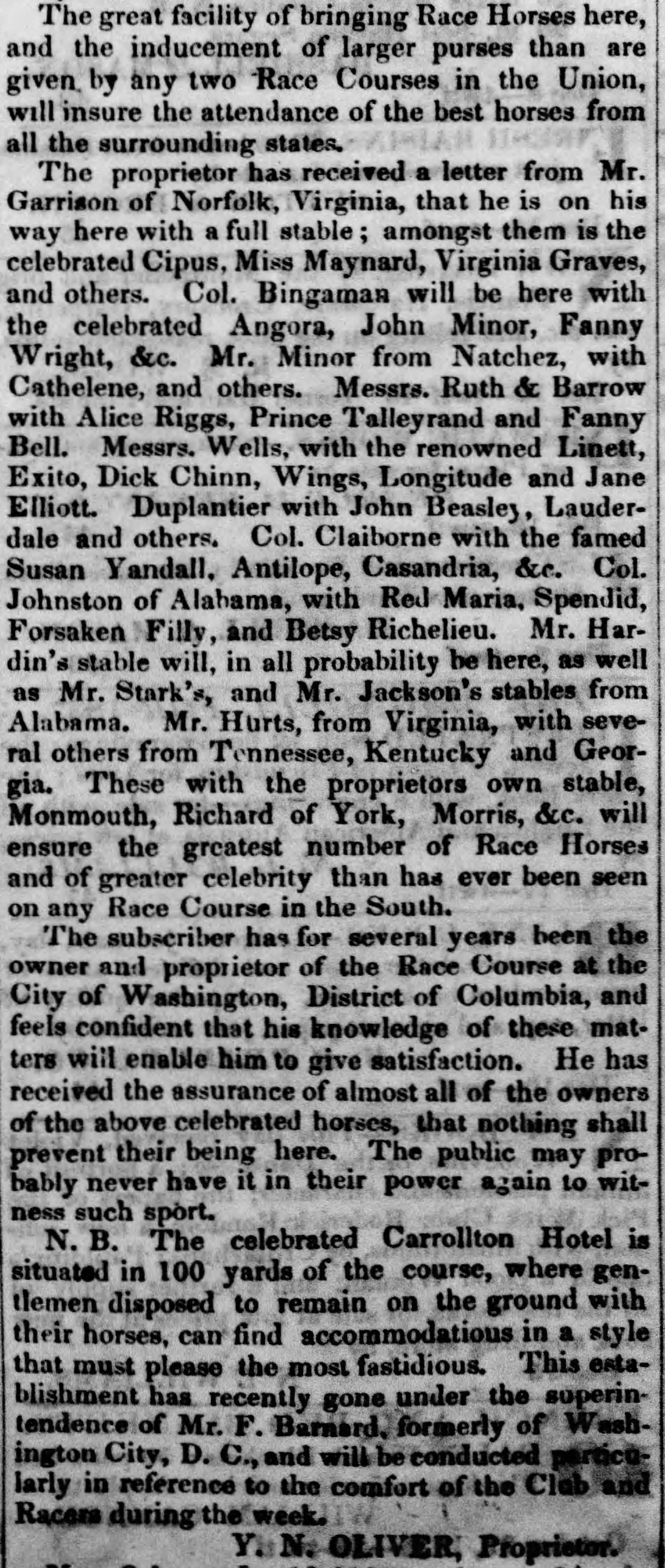
Eclipse Race Course Announcement The Mississippi Free Trader Tue Jan 17 1837

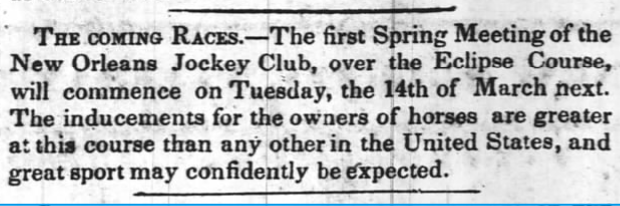
Eclipse Race Course Opening Announcement Jan 31, 1837, The Times Picayune

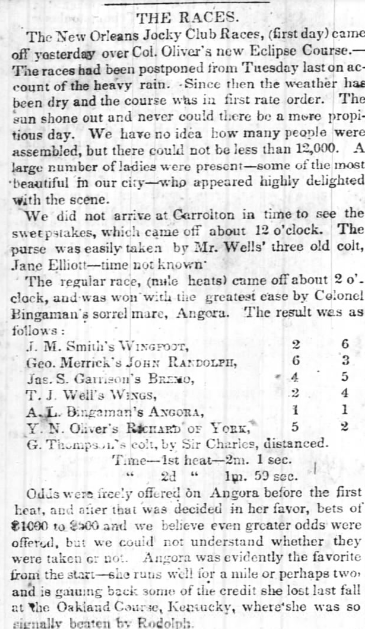
Results Spring Races Day 1, published 18 March 1837, the Eclipse Course, New Orleans

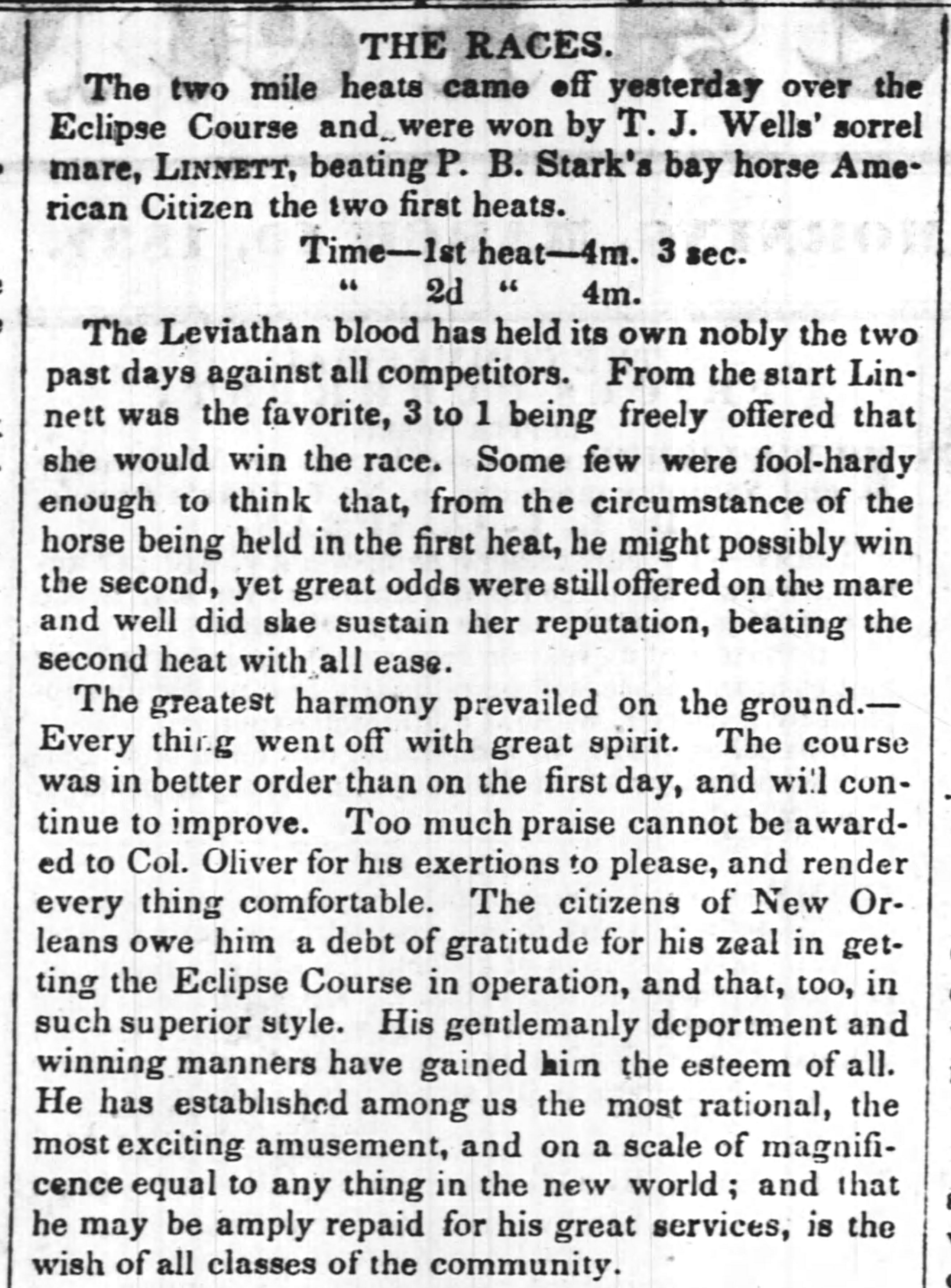
Eclipse Race Course Results, Day 2, Published The Times Picayune Sun Mar 19 1837

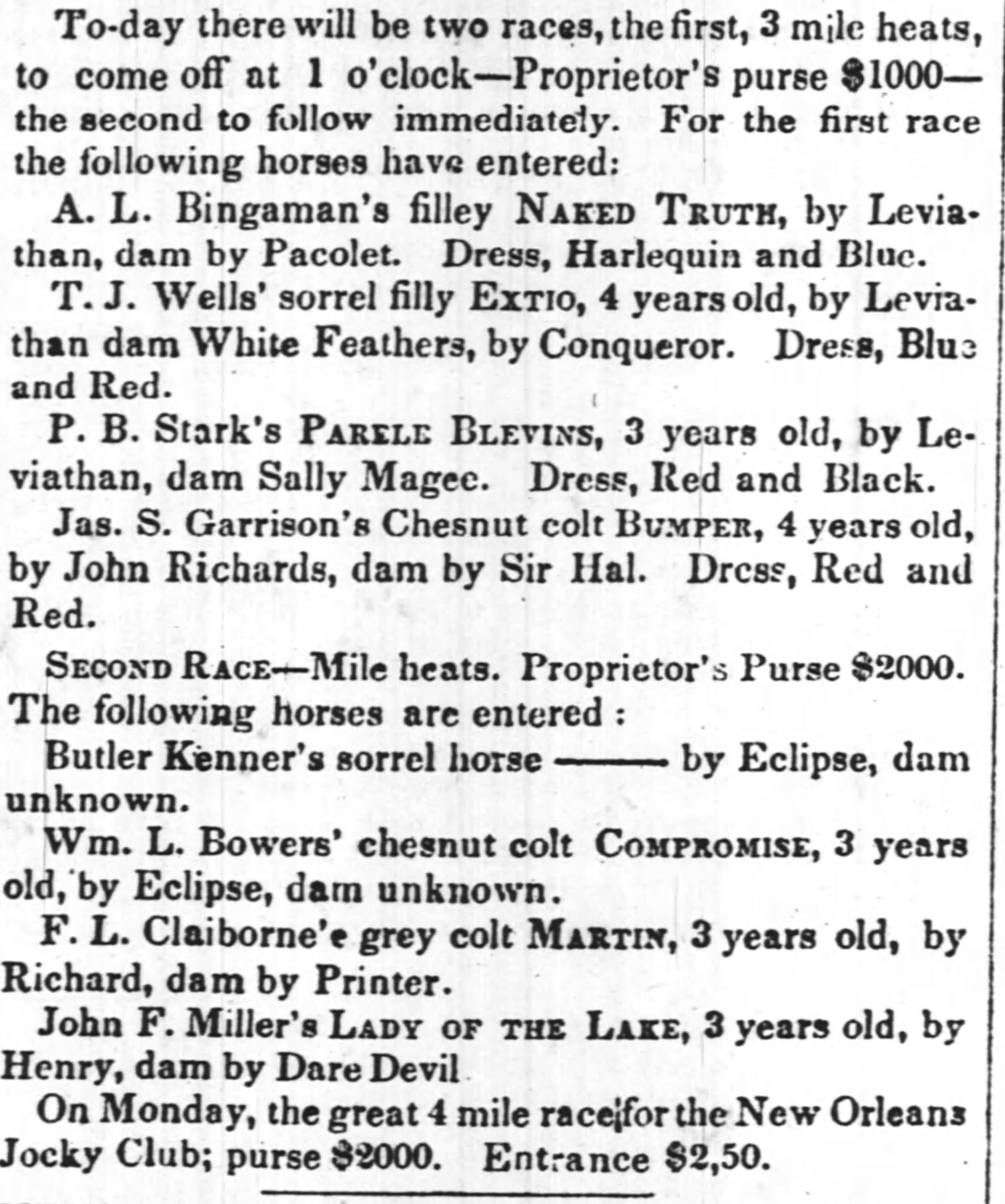
Eclipse Race Course Results, Day 2, Published The Times Picayune Sun Mar 19 1837

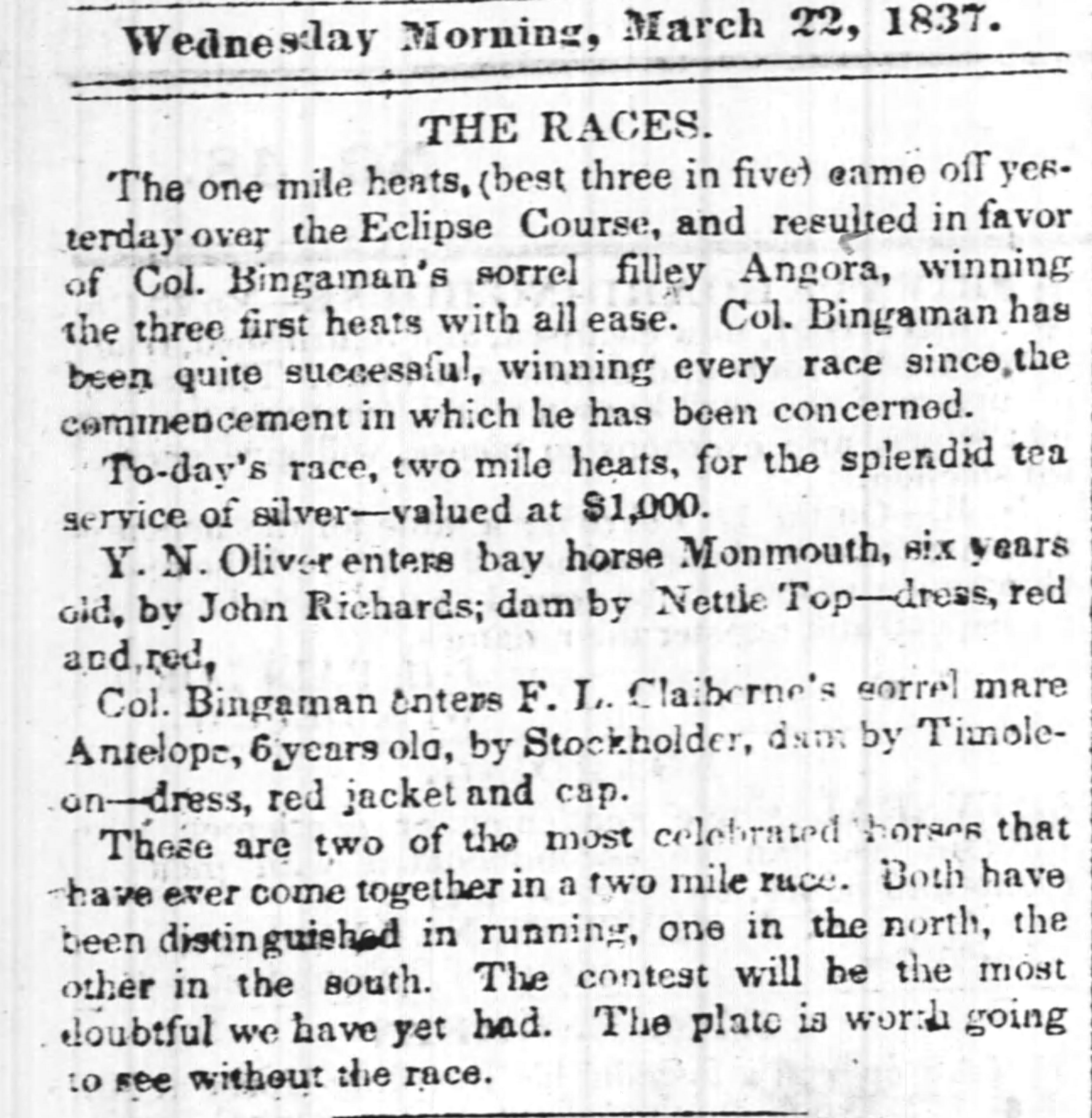
Eclipse Race Course Results, New Orleans, The Times Picayune, Published Wed Mar 22 1837

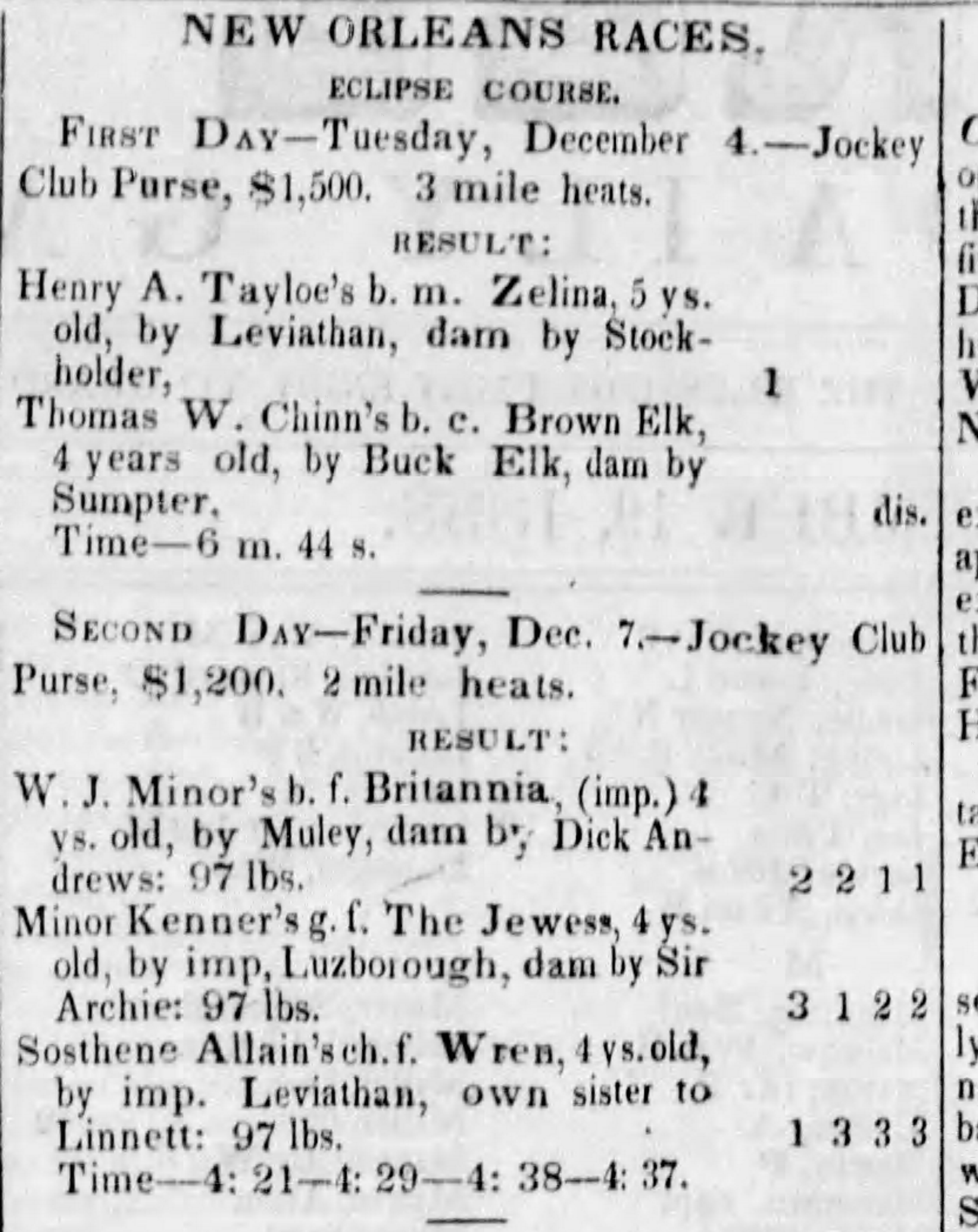
Eclipse Race Course New Orleans Fall Meeting 1838 The Mississippi Free Trader Wed Dec 19 1838

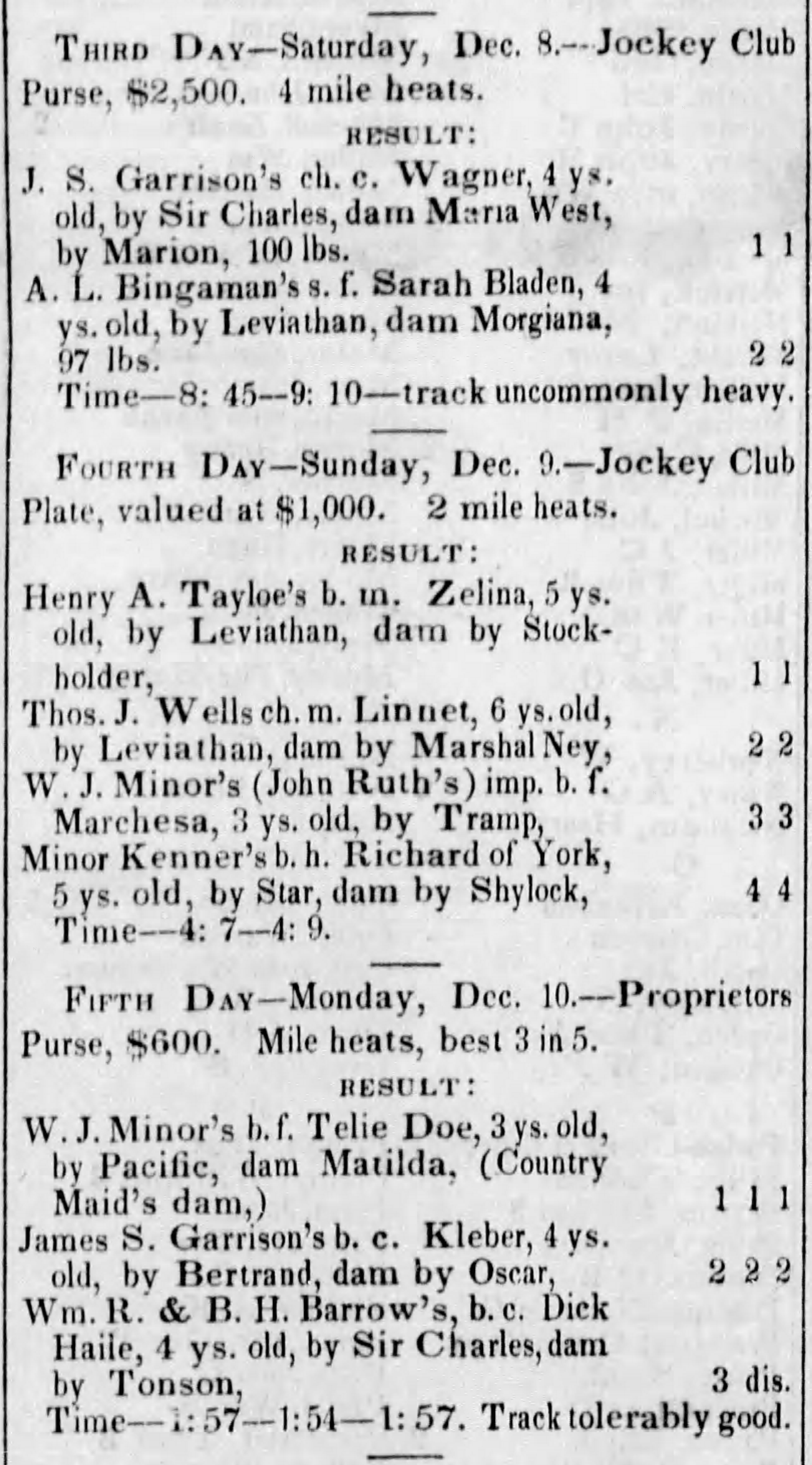
Eclipse Race Course New Orleans Fall Meeting 1838 The Mississippi Free Trader Wed Dec 19 1838

== See also ==
- Metairie Course
- Fair Grounds Race Course
- Bascombe Race Course
