= Melvin Redmond =

American elected official, politician (1935–2005)

- Born: Melvin Earvin Redmond Sr. October 5, 1935; Red Lick, Mississippi, U.S.
- Died: October 13, 2005 (aged 70); Vicksburg, Mississippi, U.S.
- Burial place: Cedar Hill Cemetery, Vicksburg, Mississippi, U.S.
- Education: Alcorn State University, Chicago Technical College
- Occupations: Alderman, elected official, acting mayor, deputy tax assessor
- Political party: Democratic
- Spouse: Beulah M. Washington
- Children: 4

Melvin Earvin Redmond Sr. (October 5, 1935 – October 13, 2005) was an American elected official and politician who served as an alderman of Vicksburg, Mississippi. He was the city's first Black elected official after the Reconstruction era; and also served as the acting mayor of Vicksburg in 1988.

== Life and career ==
Melvin E. Redmond Sr. was born on October 5, 1935, in Red Lick, Mississippi. He attended Bowman High School, Alcorn State University, Chicago Technical College. He served in the US Army for three years. Before becoming an alderman, he worked at White Store, served on the school board, and was deputy tax assessor in Warren County. He married Beulah M. Washington, and together they had four children.

Redmond was elected alderman of Vicksburg's North Ward in 1976, and remained in the role until 1992. His alderman's office was located at Vicksburg City Hall. In 1988, Redmond served as interim mayor after the resignation of Demery Grubbs. Redmond ran for mayor in the subsequent special election but lost to Robert Walker. In 1988, he switched allegiances to the Republican Party; in 1993, he returned to the Democratic Party but lost his bid for re-election as alderman.

From 1993 to 2002, he worked as the director of government affairs and community at the Isle of Capri Casino.

Redmond died at age 70 on October 13, 2005, at the River Region Medical Center (now Merit Health River Region) in Vicksburg. He was predeceased by his wife.
