= List of mayors of Vicksburg, Mississippi =

This is a list of mayors of Vicksburg, Mississippi, United States.

- R. J. McGinty, 1836
- Miles C. Fowlkes, 1839
- R. H. Crump, 1860–61
- Laz Lindsey, 1861–62
- T. J. Randolph, 1865–66
- Eric W. Wallin, 1866–67
- L.A. Mallby, 1867
- E. F. Brown, 1867–68
- B. H. Polk, 1868–69
- J. C. Webber, 1870–72
- Benjamin Lee, 1872–74
- R. O'Leary, 1874–78
- R. F. Beck, 1878–1880
- W. O. Worrell, 1880
- T. G. Birchett, 1880–84
- John W. Powell, 1885–87
- R. F. Beck, 1888–1890
- R. E. Booth: 1891–1893
- W. L. Trowbridge, 1893–94
- E.W. Swift, 1994–98
- W. L Trowbridge, 1898–1905
- B. W. Griffith, 1905–08
- P. M. Harding, 1908
- J. J. Hayes, 1908–1926
- W. J. Hossley, 1926–32
- J.C. Hamilton, 1932–44
- R. E. Selby, 1944–45
- E. W. Haining, 1945–49
- Pat Kelly, 1949–57
- John D. Holland, 1957–1968
- Murray L. Sills, 1968–1973
- Nat Bullard, 1973–77
- Travis Vance, 1977–79
- Demery F. Grubbs, 1980–88
- Melvin Redmond (acting/interim mayor), 1988
- Robert Walker, 1988–1993
- Joe Loviza, 1993–97
- Robert Walker, 1997–2001
- Laurence Leyens, 2001
- Paul E. Winfield, 2009–13
- George Flaggs Jr., 2013–2025
- Willis Thompson, 2025—

== See also ==
- List of mayors of Natchez, Mississippi
