= Redwood, Mississippi =

Place near Vicksburg

- Census-designated place
- Location within Mississippi Location within the United States
- Coordinates: 32°28′24″N 90°47′49″W
- Country: United States
- State: Mississippi
- County: Warren

Area
  - Total: 0.75 sq mi (1.93 km^{2})
  - Land: 0.75 sq mi (1.93 km^{2})
  - Water: 0 sq mi (0.00 km^{2})
- Elevation: 226 ft (69 m)

Population (2020)
  - Total: 84
  - Density: 112.5/sq mi (43.43/km^{2})
- Time zone: UTC-6 (Central (CST))
  - Summer (DST): UTC-5 (CDT)
- GNIS feature ID: 676556

Redwood is a census-designated place and unincorporated community located southeast of Twin Lake in Warren County, Mississippi, United States. The town is located near the junction of U.S. Route 61 and Mississippi Highway 3, approximately 10 miles north of Vicksburg. Its zip code is 39156.

Redwood is best known for being the site of the ancient Fort Saint-Pierre which was built by French colonialists of La Louisiane française in 1719. The French fort was destroyed by Native Americans in 1729.

The town was laid out by Thomas Redwood and was originally marketed as Carthage. By 1850 the settlement had "two stores and a post office" and residences occupied by carpenters and Yazoo River raftsmen.

Redwood was home to the Ballground Plantation, which owned slaves until 1963.

Redwood is part of the Vicksburg Micropolitan Statistical Area.

Per the 2020 Census, the population was 84.

== Demographics ==
Historical population
Census	Pop.	Note	%±
2020	84		—
U.S. Decennial Census; 2020

Redwood was first listed as a census designated place in the 2020 U.S. census.

=== 2020 census ===
Redwood CDP, Mississippi – Racial and ethnic composition Note: the US Census treats Hispanic/Latino as an ethnic category. This table excludes Latinos from the racial categories and assigns them to a separate category. Hispanics/Latinos may be of any race.
Race / Ethnicity (NH = Non-Hispanic)	Pop 2020	% 2020
White alone (NH)	80	95.24%
Black or African American alone (NH)	1	1.19%
Native American or Alaska Native alone (NH)	0	0.00%
Asian alone (NH)	0	0.00%
Pacific Islander alone (NH)	0	0.00%
Some Other Race alone (NH)	0	0.00%
Mixed Race or Multi-Racial (NH)	1	1.19%
Hispanic or Latino (any race)	2	2.38%
Total	84	100.00%
