= Walnut Hills (Mississippi) =

Geographical feature

Original U.S. government survey of the Natchez Trace showing Walnut Hills

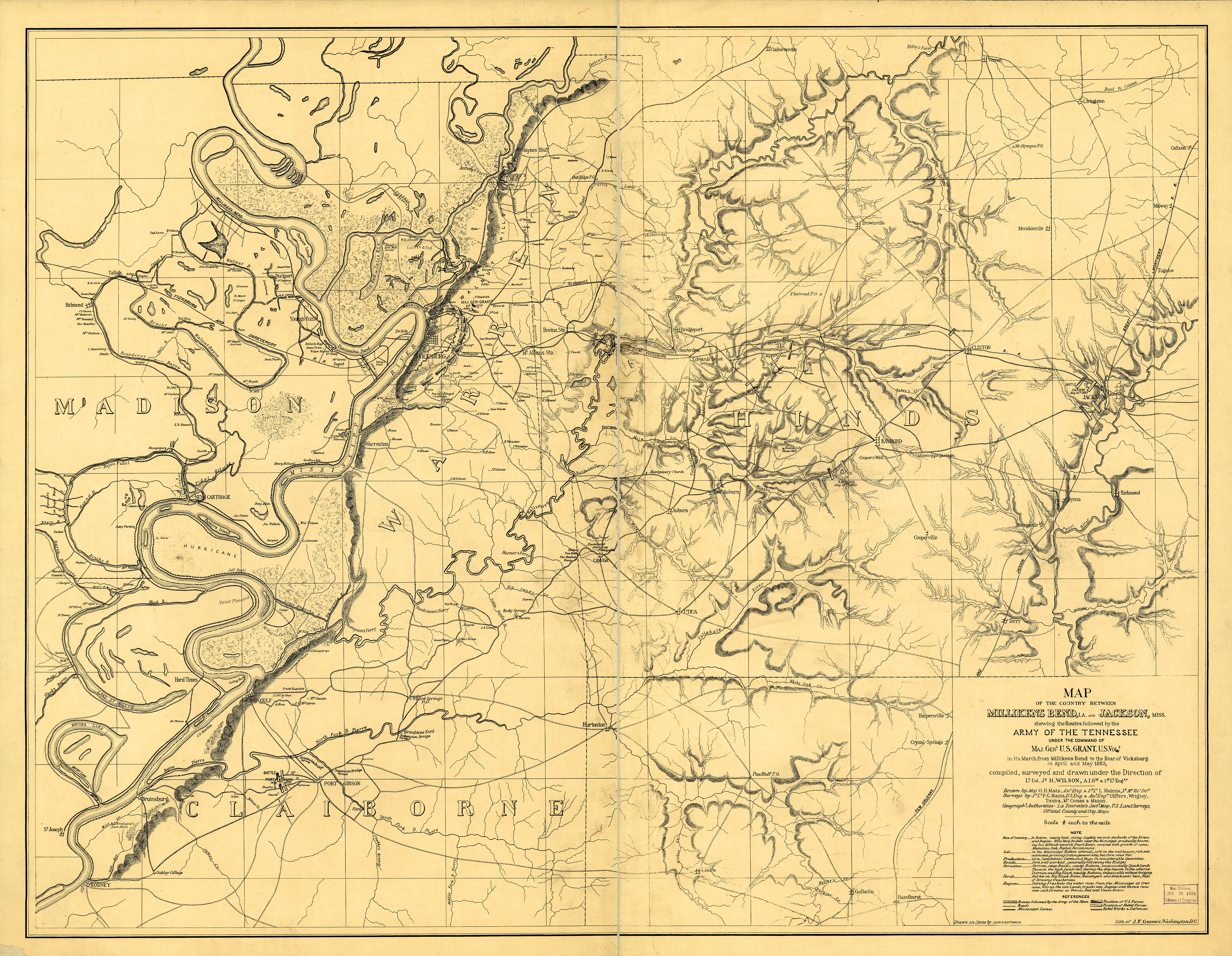
1876 map of the Vicksburg Campaign of the American Civil War, showing the Walnut Hills

The Walnut Hills are a geographic feature of the Mississippi River of North America, located near where Vicksburg, Mississippi stands today. A Choctaw settlement at this place was Nanachehaw. According to the journal of Indian trader George Rapalje another Choctaw name for the place was Joeyinchweaw.

== Description ==
Walnut Hills, and the Spanish colonial Fort Nogales, were both named for a prominent grove of black walnut trees. According to the Vicksburg Post, "...during the entire colonial period of our history, there was a great bend in the course of the Mississippi at the foot of the bluffs. The Walnut Hills, as this area was called, overlooked this difficult-to-navigate bend, and through those treacherous waters no vessel could pass unnoticed. The wild Yazoo poured its waters into the Mississippi just above the bend, and the Big Black River came tumbling down out of the hills to create mysterious currents and terrifying whirlpools where it joined the Mississippi just below the bend. Men who passed this way in fragile vessels, depending upon their own muscle-power and sharp wits to get them through the constantly changing currents, could not stop to argue the rights and claims of their respective rulers with those who looked down upon them from the Walnut Hills! Whoever held the bluffs, controlled the river and could open or close it to foreign navigation at will."

According to a travelogue published in 1826, "Soon after you pass the mouth of that river, your eye is cheered with the green heads of the Walnut Hills. They are beautiful and rich eminences, clad with an abundance of those trees whose name they bear. Here, too, you begin to see the southern style of building, the indications of being among the opulent cotton-planters. The stranger inquires the object and use of a cluster of little buildings that lie about the principal house, like bee-hives. These are the habitations of the negroes." A travel guide of 1850 described the hills as extending "along the E. bank of the river about two miles. They rise boldly, though gradually, with alternate swells and gullies, to the height of nearly 500 feet, and form one of the most beautiful prospects to be met with on the Lower Mississippi." Vicksburg itself was known as Walnut Hills in early days (from about 1806), because "When the first settlers arrived the hills on which the city now stands were densely wooded and covered from the river to their summits with a thick undergrowth of cane. The black walnut was very plentiful, and the new town was known for years as Walnut Hills."

== See also ==
- Fort St. Pierre
- Fort Nogales
