= Old Bridgeport Road =

Historical road in Mississippi

Coordinates: 32.39104°N 90.42001°W

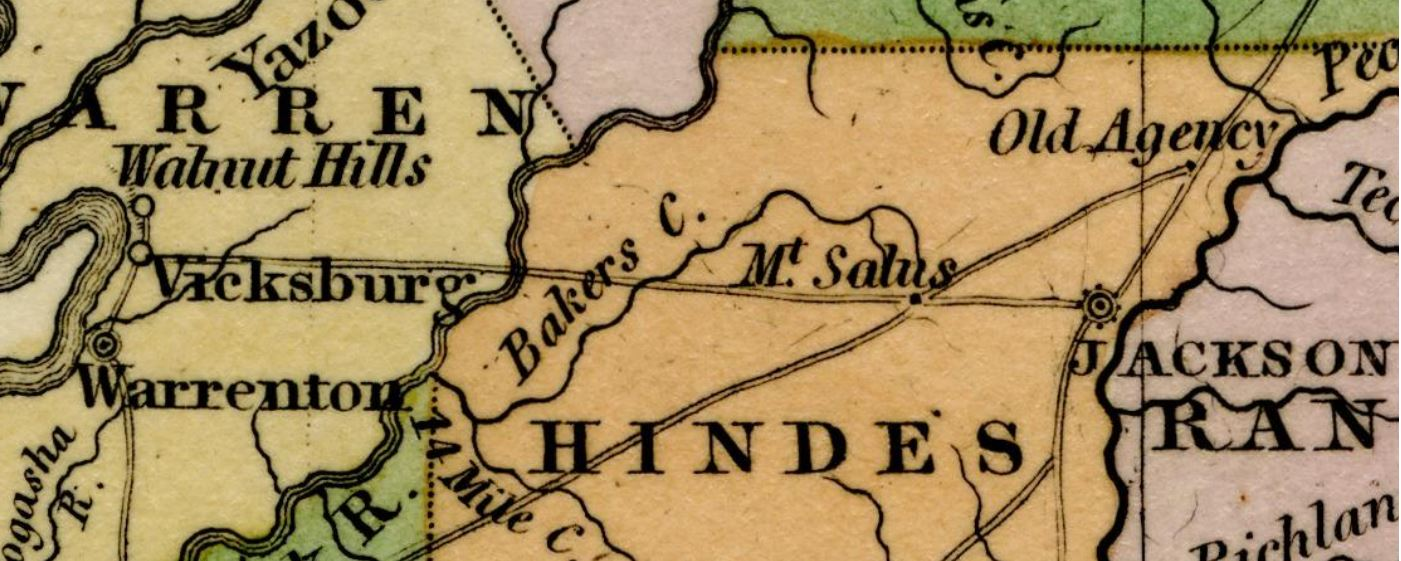
1828 map showing the Old Bridgeport Road (located in center of map)

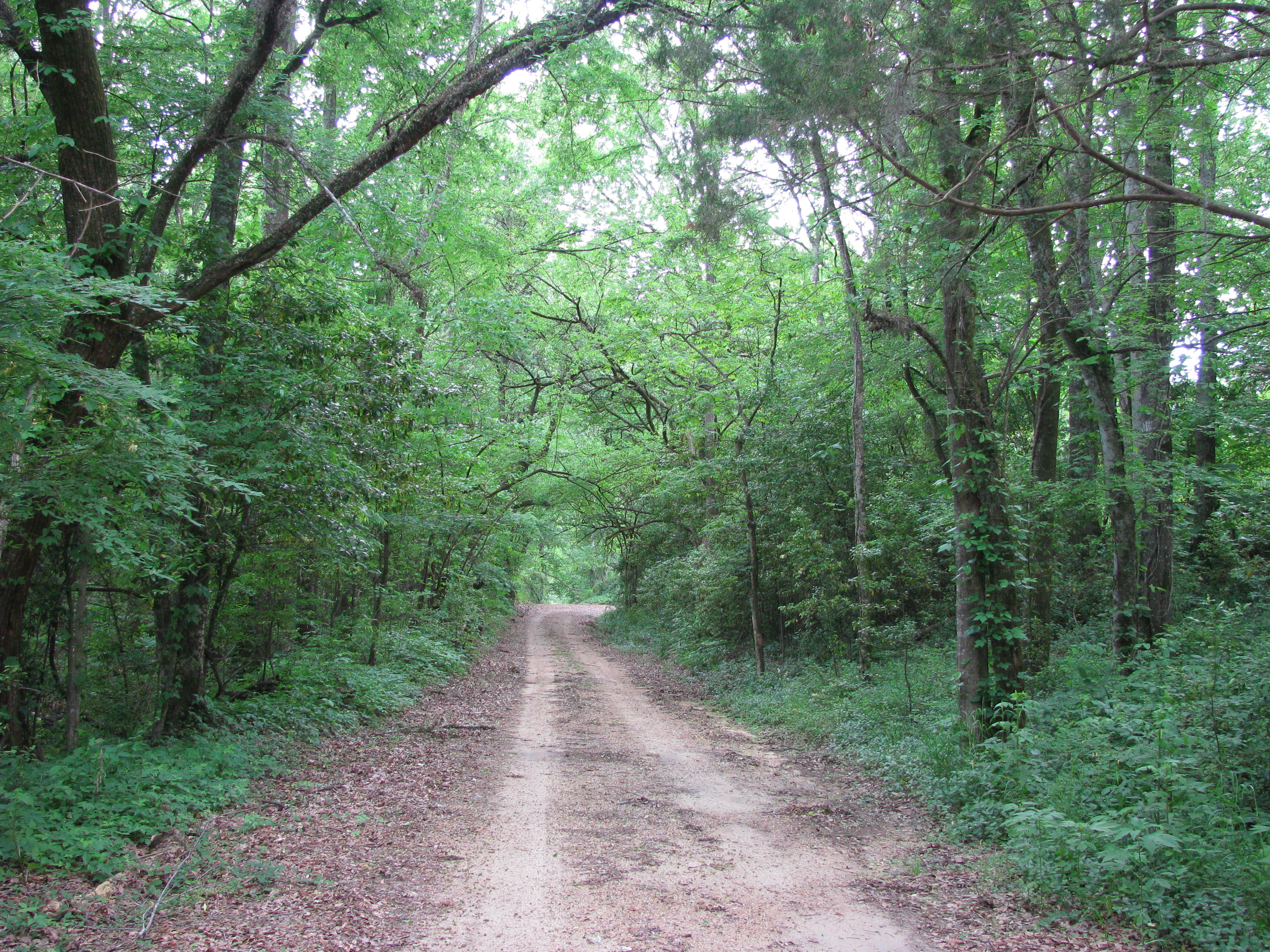
Old Bridgeport Road in 2009

The Old Bridgeport Road is a historic road in Mississippi in the United States. It was the first route built by the state of Mississippi through the frontier region known as the Choctaw Cession, which the state acquired in the Treaty of Doak's Stand. The road, built between 1822 and 1825, was named for the now-extinct community of Bridgeport, which stood at the crossing of the Big Black River.

The route was later designated a federal Post Road and in the 1840s was served by daily stagecoach service between the capital, Jackson, and Vicksburg on the Mississippi River. The road was used extensively by Union and Confederate troops before, during and after the Siege of Vicksburg and the occupation of Jackson.

After the Civil War, as traffic shifted toward railroad communities to the south, the Old Bridgeport Road fell into decline. Today, most of the original route has been bulldozed and supplanted by more modern roads which go by different names, while other sections have been abandoned, with only one 3/10s-mile section north of Bolton, Mississippi still in use in its original condition. The surviving section, a narrow, graveled passage with high banks and an overhanging canopy of mature live oak trees, is a designated Mississippi Landmark.

The Board of Trustees of the Mississippi Department of Archives and History, which has the authority to prevent the destruction of listed historic properties when tax dollars are being used, resisted a controversial effort by the Hinds County Board of Supervisors in 2003 to bulldoze and widen the last original segment, which borders a listed Native American site, a Union Army camp, Holly Grove Plantation House (listed in the National Register of Historic Places) and an African American cemetery believed to have its origins in a slave cemetery. As a result of continuing pressure by the Board of Supervisors to bulldoze the road, the Mississippi Heritage Trust included the Old Bridgeport Road among historic properties on its 10 Most Endangered List in 2005.

Afterward, a nearby landowner, Gaddis & McLaurin Farms, donated an easement to the county to build a new road to the north of the Old Bridgeport Road, to provide access to a small group of houses that had previously used the historic route. Once the new road was complete the county abandoned the Old Bridgeport Road, which then reverted to private use. As a result, the Old Bridgeport Road will be preserved in its historic condition.
