= Vicksburg Theatre Guild =

Community theater troupe in Vicksburg, Mississippi, United States

Coordinates: 32.31772°N 90.890445°W

The Vicksburg Theatre Guild is a community theater troupe in Vicksburg, Mississippi, USA. Chartered in 1936, it is the oldest community of interests theater in the state. It is also the current home of the Guinness Book of World Records' longest running show, Gold in the Hills.

Each year, the Main Stage Productions offers four or five plays or musicals.

Gold in the Hills takes place in April and July.

Fairy Tale Theatre is a summer children’s education production with performances in late June.
