= Henry Tooley (physician) =

American physician and public official (1774–1848)

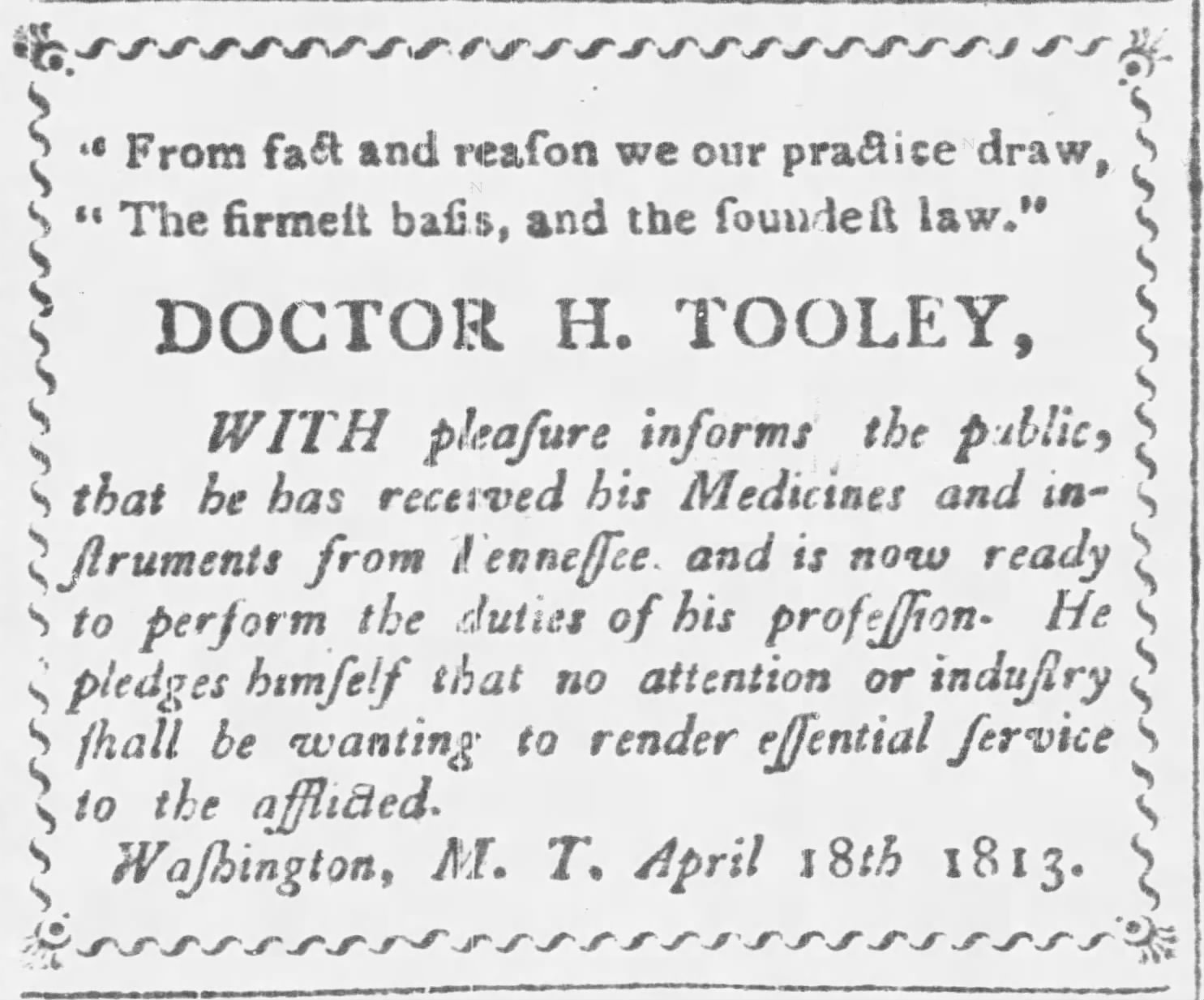
"DOCTOR H. TOOLEY" Natchez Gazette, May 25, 1813

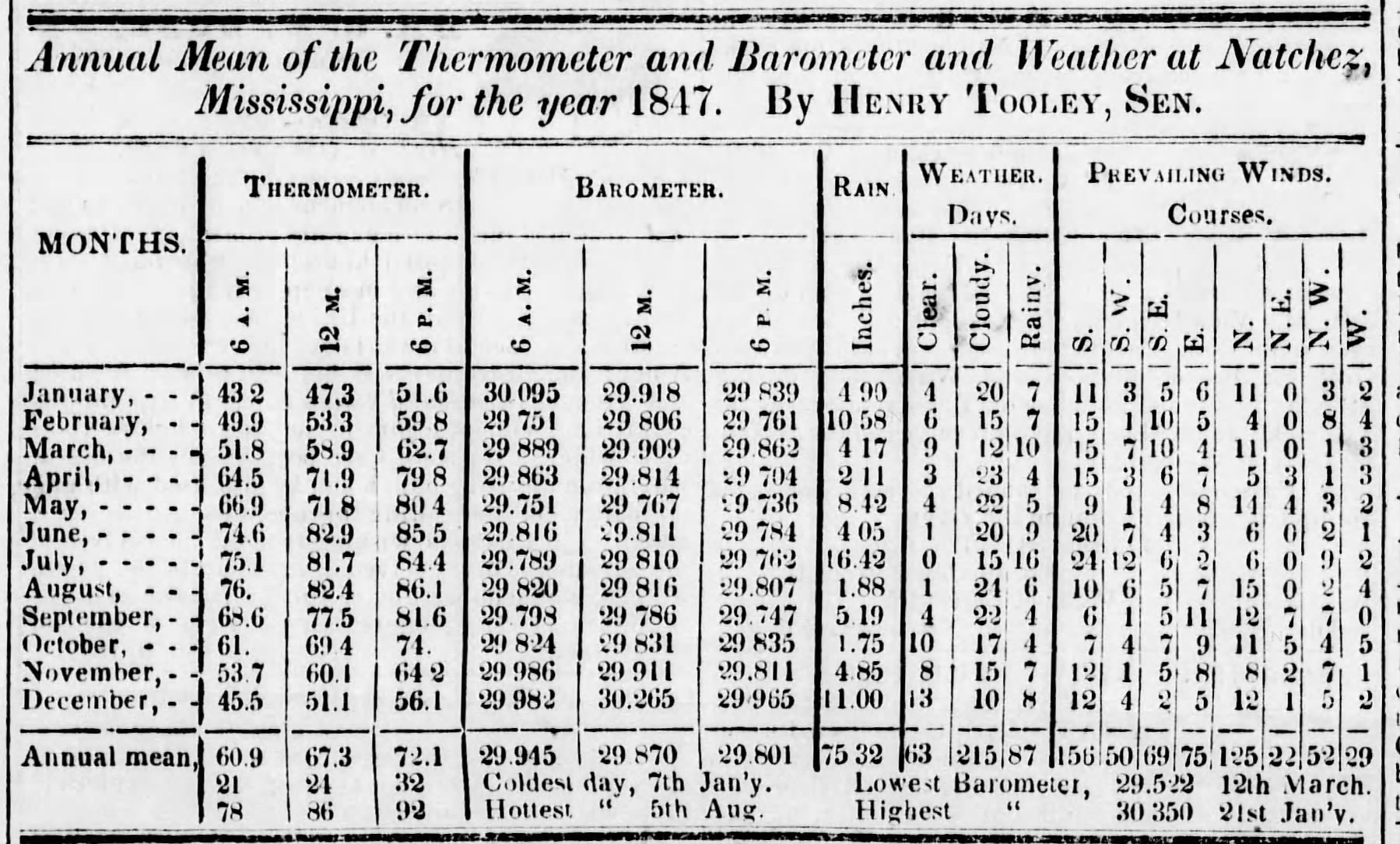
1847 weather record created by Tooley (The Semi-Weekly Mississippi Free Trader, January 6, 1848)

Henry Tooley (June 27, 1774–June 18, 1848) was an American medical doctor, meteorologist, astronomer, pastor, and local politician who served as mayor of Natchez, Mississippi in 1837–1838. In addition to serving as mayor, he was a justice of the peace and the president of the board of county police. Tooley was born in Craven County, North Carolina. He worked as a doctor in Tennessee for some time before moving to Adams County, Mississippi. Based on a slave sale ad, in 1815 he and his brother lived near the territorial capital of Washington, Mississippi.

He had his own astronomical–meteorological observatory, stocked with "practically the only" telescope in the state. He created daily meteorological records for 27 years and documented all visible solar and lunar eclipses. Benjamin L. C. Wailes later used Tooley's records as sources in his writing about Mississippi agriculture and geology.

Dr. Tooley published monographs on the 1823 yellow fever outbreak in Natchez and the 1840 Natchez tornado. His study of the yellow fever has been characterized as "competent." He became a Methodist Episcopal clergyman in later life.

Tooley was treasurer and lecturer of a Masonic lodge that in 1817 initiated Joseph E. Davis, brother of Jefferson Davis. Tooley was the first Grand Master of a Mississippi Masonic lodge organized in 1818. Younger Masonic brothers called him "Granda Toolep".

In 1831 he led a group of "indignant church leaders" opposed to the production of the play My Old Woman by Sol Smith, ultimately forcing Smith out of Natchez. He was a member of the Washington Lyceum, founded 1835.

The cause of Tooley's death was listed as "general debility".

There is a Tooley family lot at "Old Natchez City Cemetery". Among the burials there are Henry Tooley's first three wives: Mary Susannah Dromgoole Tooley (1782–1817), daughter of James Dromgoole, a Continental soldier of the American Revolutionary War; Susan Bledsoe Tooley (1790–1818), and Elizabeth Davis Tooley (1790–1874). The portrait painter James Tooley Jr. was his son.

Tooley's brother James Tooley Sr. is buried in the Galtney family cemetery, four miles outside of Washington in Adams County, Mississippi. He was born near New Bern, North Carolina, in 1769, and died at Natchez in 1845.

== See also ==
- List of mayors of Natchez, Mississippi

== Sources ==
- James, D. Clayton (1993) [1968]. Antebellum Natchez. Baton Rouge, Louisiana: Louisiana State University Press. ISBN 978-0-8071-1860-3. LCCN 68028496. OCLC 28281641.
