= Vicksburg Riverfront Murals =

Murals by Robert Dafford in Vicksburg, Mississippi

The Vicksburg Riverfront Murals project is a series of murals painted on Mississippi River flood walls in Vicksburg, Mississippi in the United States. The murals are intended to depict the city's historical significance, as well as its envisioned future role in the region's commerce and culture.

== Levee Street murals ==
Artist Robert Dafford was commissioned to complete the first series of 12'x 20' panels along the flood wall facing Levee Street. The first mural in the series was unveiled in 2002. In all, 32 panels completed the first phase of the project.

== Grove Hill mural ==
In 2012, a 55 ft. mural was commissioned to be painted on the Grove Street flood wall, across the street from the Levee Street murals. The mural is designed to be triangular in shape due to Grove Street's incline. The mural is a feature along the route of the annual 10k Run Thru History event, and depicts a group runners passing by areas of historical significance in Vicksburg.
