= James Tooley Jr. =

American painter (1816–1844)

James Tooley Jr. (1816–August 10, 1844) was an American artist who was born and raised in the Natchez District and is considered one of the best painters produced by the lower Mississippi River valley before the American Civil War. His father, Henry Tooley, was a physician and naturalist who had his own telescope observatory. His mother was likely Mary Dromgoole, the second of Dr. Tooley's four wives. Tooley initially trained as a physician but quickly showed such aptitude for the visual arts that he turned to it full time. He painted portrait miniatures and full-size portraits in oil, and studied in Philadelphia with Thomas Sully. His travels yielded landscapes of Tennessee, Georgia, and Texas. His work has been described as "careful" and "luminous." He died of pulmonary consumption and chronic dysentery at his father's house in Natchez in 1844.
