= Fort Nogales =

Spanish fort in Mississippi (1789–1798)

Coordinates: 32.37182°N 90.87179°W

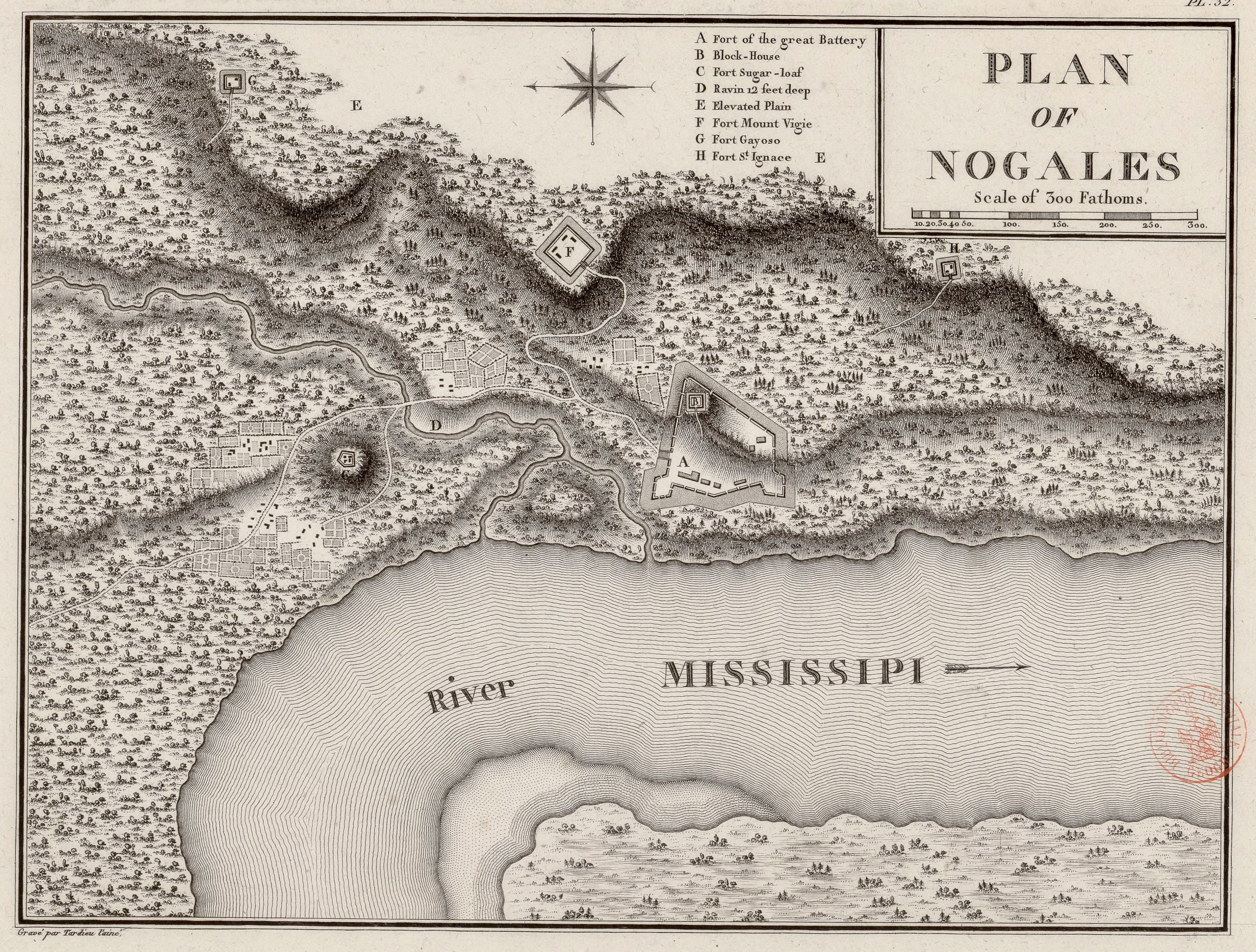
Plan of Nogales on the Mississippi River c. 1795 showing Fort Nogales

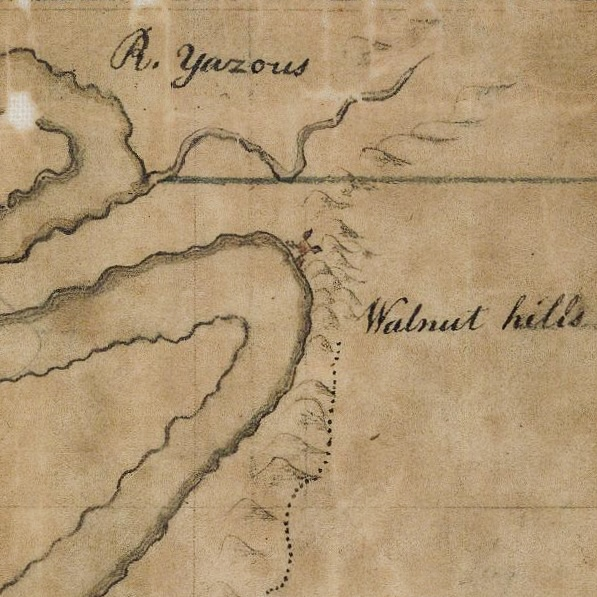
Fort near Walnut hills c. 1800

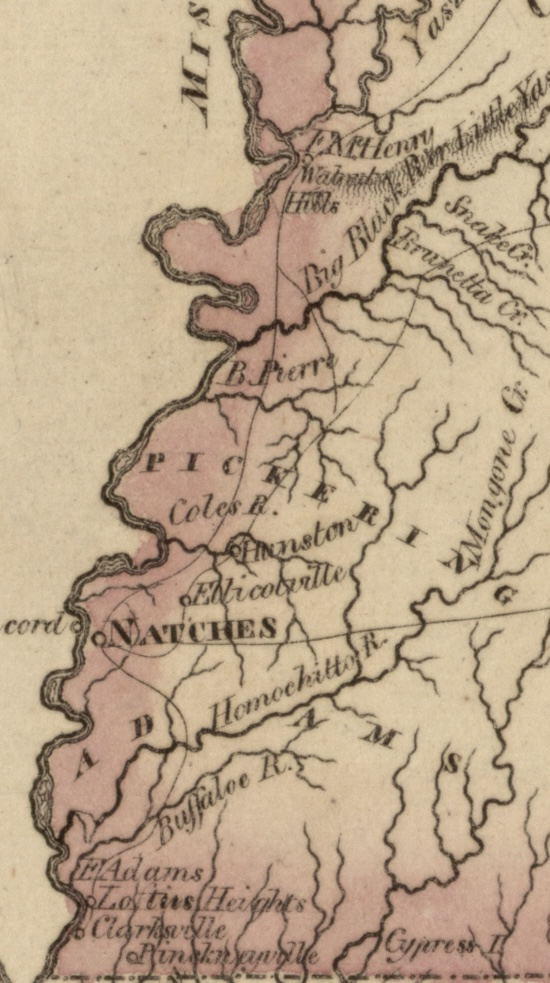
Fort McHenry c. 1800 in the American Natchez District

Fort Nogales was an 18th-century Spanish colonial fort in West Florida, at the confluence of the Yazoo River and the Mississippi River. The fort stood at the site of present-day Vicksburg, Warren County, Mississippi, United States. The name Nogales means walnuts in Spanish. The name of the Spanish fort and the early 19th-century American settlement called Walnut Hills were both named for the groves of Juglans nigra (North American black walnut) in the woods surrounding the settlement.

== History ==
The site atop the bluffs, in what had until the 1729 Natchez Revolt been the lands of the Natchez people, was first settled by a tiny colony of immigrants in 1783. In 1789, a special Spanish mission to the Choctaw in 1791 was sent to negotiate continued overland access to the fort via the Natchez Trace and other Indigenous trails. That sorted, in 1791, the Spanish constructed stockades, barracks, and blockhouses called Fort Gayso (after district governor Gayoso), Fort St. Ignatius, Fort Mount Vigie, and Fort Sugar-Loaf in the surrounding hills. According to Dunbar Rowland, "The construction was in progress in May 1791, when David Smith was there, and he reported to Gov. Blount, in the [American Southwest Territory (Tennessee)], that the works were extensive. He described the site as a mile and a half below the mouth of the Yazoo, on a high bluff. There were then two blockhouses and large barracks completed. Besides other laborers 'about 30 United States deserters' were engaged in the work. A galley and Spanish gunboat were lying in the river close at hand." Fort Sugar-Loaf and Fort Mount Vignié each had four cannon, Gayoso and Ignatius were smaller blockhouses, and the main Fort Nogales "on the south side of the creek, called the fort of the great battery, was an enclosure made on the river side by a wall of masonry twelve feet high and four feet thick, and on the land side a ditch four feet wide and three deep, and palisades twelve feet high. Twelve cannon were mounted in the river battery, and a blockhouse with four howitzers was placed on an eminence in the rear, included in the quadrangle, within which, also, were a powder magazine, the commander's house and barracks for two hundred men." About 80 men were present circa 1796. According to American historian Marion Bragg, "Victor Collot, a French general who made a voyage down the Mississippi in 1796, sneered at the fortifications the Spanish had constructed on the bluff in 1791. The Spanish had blundered from hill to hill, adding on little outposts, he said, and the whole complex could be overwhelmed in a few minutes by any handful of determined men."

John Turnbull had a franchise from the Spanish to run a trading post at the fort; middlemen including Jacques Rapalje brought in deer, otter, raccoon, wild cat, fox, and bear pelts, traded from the Choctaw.

The Treaty of Fort Nogales between the Spanish and the Choctaw, Chickasaw, Cherokee, and Muscogee was signed there in 1793, reaffirming "the Spanish-Indian alliance and commerce treaties of 1784." The treaties were mutual defense agreements that promised "annual supplies and gifts to the tribes," with the larger geopolitical intent of compelling Anglo-American settlers "to stay out of the Indian lands" and the Louisiana region generally. Surveyor Andrew Ellicott visited in 1797. The commander of the fort, a Creole named Elias Beauregard, evacuated the post "in March, 1798, after giving four days notice to Capt. Minor at Natchez, who informed [Capt. Isaac Guion]. The latter took no steps to occupy the works, because his orders were that Maj. Kersey should arrive with reinforcements for that purpose. Consequently the fort was for a time vacant. When Beauregard left, Guion's courier was there, 'and besides sixteen or seventeen inhabitants, particularly one Mr. Glass,' that for their own interest would not suffer the Indians to make depredations." Shortly thereafter, "Major Kersey, with a detachment of United States troops, took possession. He was followed by Col. Jean François Hamtramck with the 1st regiment, who, after remaining a short time at Natchez, established his headquarters at Fort Adams. General Wilkinson arrived August 26th and immediately concentrated the troops at Loftus Heights, where he constructed a strong earth work, magazines and barracks, and designated it Fort Adams." The 15ish settlers that lived around the fort were soon joined by a colony of Americans primarily hailing from Virginia.

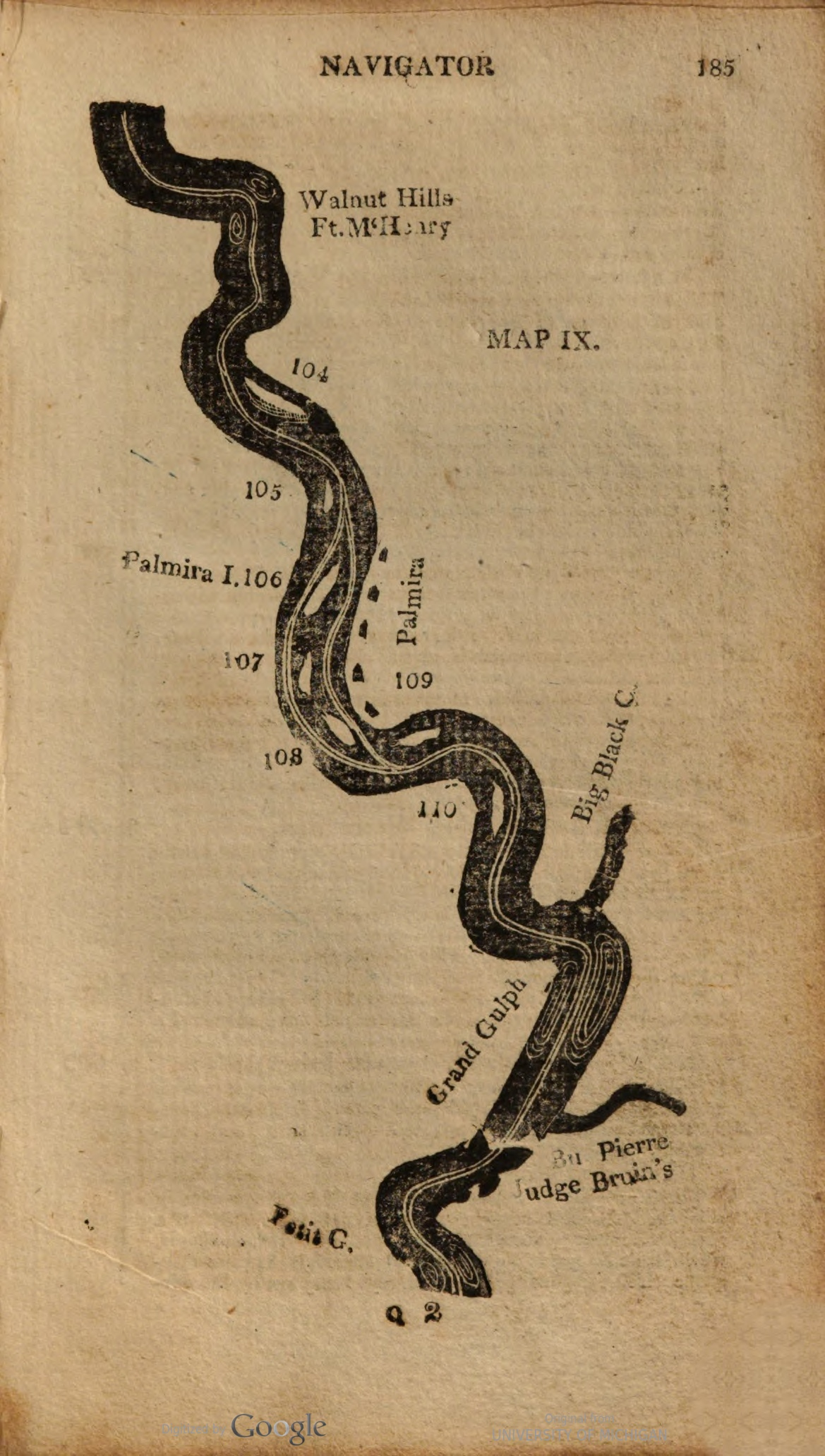
Mississippi River map IX from Zadok Cramer's The Navigator

When the Mississippi Territory was organized by the United States in 1798 the name was "changed" to Fort McHenry (after Secretary of State James McHenry). The American garrison that had occupied the fort, and renamed it Fort McHenry, departed in 1799 or 1800. In 1809 a traveler recorded in his journal that nothing remained but "earthen ramparts." The location of Fort McHenry "was never called by that name except in public documents, really there was no sign of a fort to be called by any name." Until 1849, the site was mostly called simply "Spanish Fort." The landmark of Fort McHenry was "involved in the land schemes of the fraudulent Yazoo Company, entailing much litigation with regard to title."

The old location of Fort Mount Vigie, called Fort Hill, had a key role in the American Civil War battle known as the Siege of Vicksburg in 1863, because it anchored "the Confederate left flank on the Mississippi River, [and] its guns commanded the Union right as well as the river."
