= Holly Grove Plantation House =

Historic house in Mississippi, United States

- U.S. National Register of Historic Places
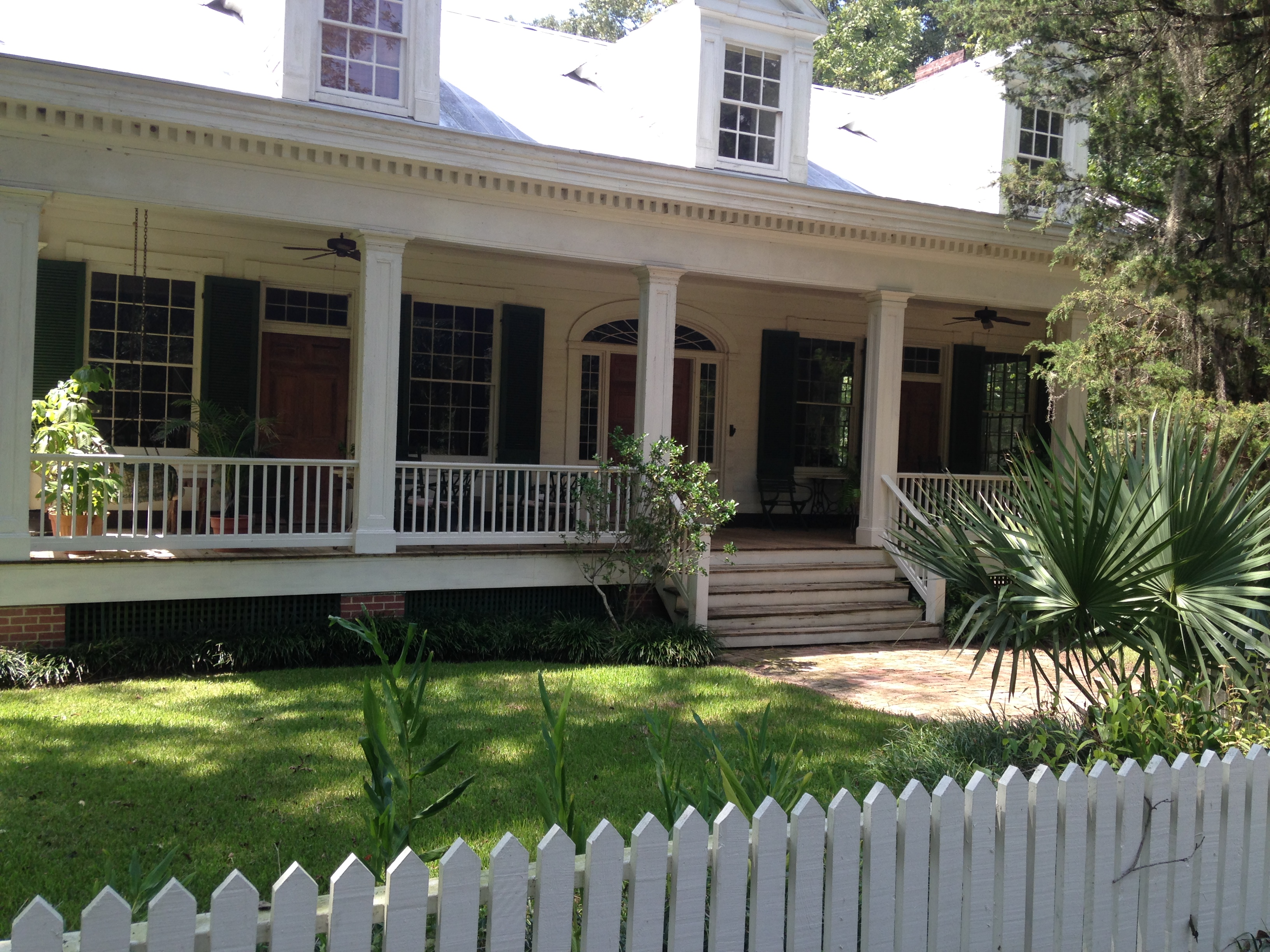

- Location within Mississippi Location within the United States
- Nearest city: Bolton, Mississippi
- Coordinates: 32°23′25″N 90°25′4″W
- Built: 1832
- Architectural style: Greek Revival, Federal
- NRHP reference No.: 96001313
- Added to NRHP: November 7, 1996

Holly Grove Plantation House was built c. 1830 by Noel and Jane Killingsworth near Red Lick, Mississippi, and dismantled and reconstructed 70 miles (110 km) to the north in Hinds County, Mississippi, in 1990. The Killingsworths lived there with their children and grandchildren, including Sarah Ellen Grafton. They sent her and their other daughters to Nazareth Academy in Bardstown, Kentucky.

== History ==
The house, a mixture of federal and Greek Revival architecture, was originally constructed from a kit manufactured in Cincinnati, the components of which were shipped down the Ohio and Mississippi rivers to Rodney, Mississippi, and transported to Red Lick by wagons along with a crew supplied by the manufacturer, believed to be Hinkle, Guild & Co. The frame of the house, of post-and-beam, mortise-and-tenon construction, includes numerous interchangeable components (indicating manufactured millwork), with Roman numeral markings. The original foundation sills were hewn on site, with manufactured framework of poplar, spruce and fir, exterior siding and trim of cypress, walls and ceilings of tongue-in-groove spruce and fir and floors of heart pine.

== Layout ==
The basic plan consists of a full-width undercut front gallery and center hall with two rooms on either side; a stair mounts from the hall to a second-story hall with a room on either side. A dining wing (no longer extant) was added to the rear of the house, along with a full-width breezeway and side galleries on either side (along with a secondary stair) c. 1850.

== Ownership ==
The house remained in the Killingsworth family until 1990; it was listed in 1996 on the National Register of Historic Places after being reconstructed and restored at its new site along the Old Bridgeport Road by its present owner, Alan Huffman.

== Features ==
Notable features include a fanlight and sidelights framing double paneled front doors, original false graining on all original doors, original marbleizing on surviving mantels, and handwriting (including notes, poems and other records) on walls throughout the house, with the earliest dating to 1870. The nearby Old Bridgeport Road is a registered Mississippi Landmark. The current site has had a variety of uses, first as a Native American camp, later as Hall's Plantation, which was occupied by Union troops on numerous occasions during the Civil War, and finally as the center of an African American tenant farming community.
