= Robert H. Wood =

African American politician of Natchez, Mississippi, first black mayor (1844–?)

Robert H. Wood (c. 1844–?) was an African American 19th-century politician, postmaster, and sheriff. He served as the first African American Mayor of Natchez, Mississippi from 1870 until 1871, and was part of the Adams County Board of Supervisors from 1871 to 1872. He was one of only five black mayors in the American South during the Reconstruction-era; and is thought to be the first black mayor in Mississippi.

== Biography ==
Robert H. Wood was born in about 1844, his mother was a free African American and his father was a Euro-American former mayor of Natchez.

In 1865, he worked at a photographic printshop with John R. Lynch, Wood and Lynch formed a relationship at the printshop that followed them in to later life, and Lynch also went on to serve in political office. Wood owned a 36-acre farm in 1870.

Wood was appointed Mayor of Natchez in 1869 during the Reconstruction era by governor James Alcorn, and elected to the office in 1870. Wood lost his reelection campaign in 1871. He served on the Adams County Board of Supervisors from 1871 to 1872; elected as postmaster from 1874 to 1876; and in 1875 he elected sheriff and also as the tax collector of Adams County. Wood was the second African American elected as sheriff in Adams County, following William McCary.

Wood worked alongside Robert W. Fitzhugh, and they managed Lynch's successful 1870 campaign for United States Congress for Mississippi's 6th congressional district. Wood was a member of the Freemasons. He was involved in establishing the first school for African Americans in Natchez in 1871. Isaac Lowenberg, who was Jewish, was elected the city's mayor in 1882.

In 2004, the next African American mayor of the city was elected, Phillip West, and he paid tribute to Wood in a 2016 short history film.

== See also ==
- Hiram Revels, also from Natchez
- List of mayors of Natchez, Mississippi
- List of first African-American mayors
