= Temple High School (Mississippi) =

Public school in Vicksburg, US, 1959–1971

Rosa A. Temple High School
- 1533 Rosa Temple Drive, Vicksburg, Mississippi; United States

Information
- Type: Public
- Established: 1959
- Closed: 1971
- Grades: 9–12
- Mascot: Buccaneers

Rosa A. Temple High School was a high school for black students in Vicksburg, Mississippi. It succeeded Magnolia Avenue High School which was renamed Bowman High School in 1945. Rosa A. Temple High School operated during Jim Crow from 1959 until its closure in 1971 in the wake of desegregation. Its teams won state championships in football and baseball. Vicksburg High School was whites only. The Temple High School building at 1533 Rosa Temple Drive became Vicksburg Junior High School.

== History ==
In 1923 Magnolia School opened. It succeeded an earlier school for black students on Cherry Street. It became Bowman High School in 1944, when it was renamed for J. G. H. Bowman, its principal from 1906 to 1944. A historical marker commemorates the school's history.

Rosa A. Temple High School was established in 1959 to replace J. G. H. Bowman High School. It was named in honor of Rosa A. Temple, a respected educator in the community.

O. W. Sanders served as the first principal, followed by J. E. Stirgus. In 1971, the school closed as part of the broader desegregation efforts mandated across the United States. Its legacy is preserved through a mural and commemorative plaque in Vicksburg. Baldwin Ferry Road was renamed for Rosa A. Temple as Rosa A. Temple Drive.

Teachers at the school included Elliot Coleman, TJ Watson, Frank Crump Jr., and Barbara Francis Banks, with Lewis W. "Jiving" Jones as the band director. The school used a buccaneer as their mascot.

== Athletics ==
The Temple High School football team won three consecutive Big 8 football championships under the leadership of head coach Houston Markham.

In basketball, coach Levern McClelland helped lead the school to an undefeated 28–0 season in 1968, achieving consecutive state championships in 1967 and 1968. Carl Jackson went on to become a prominent college basketball player Marshall Sanders went on to play basketball for Harvard University

== Notable alumni ==
- Robert Major Walker (c. 1943–2025), first African American mayor of Vicksburg
- James E. Winfield (1944–2000) civil rights lawyer, politician, and city prosecutor in Vicksburg; class of 1963
