= List of mayors of Natchez, Mississippi =

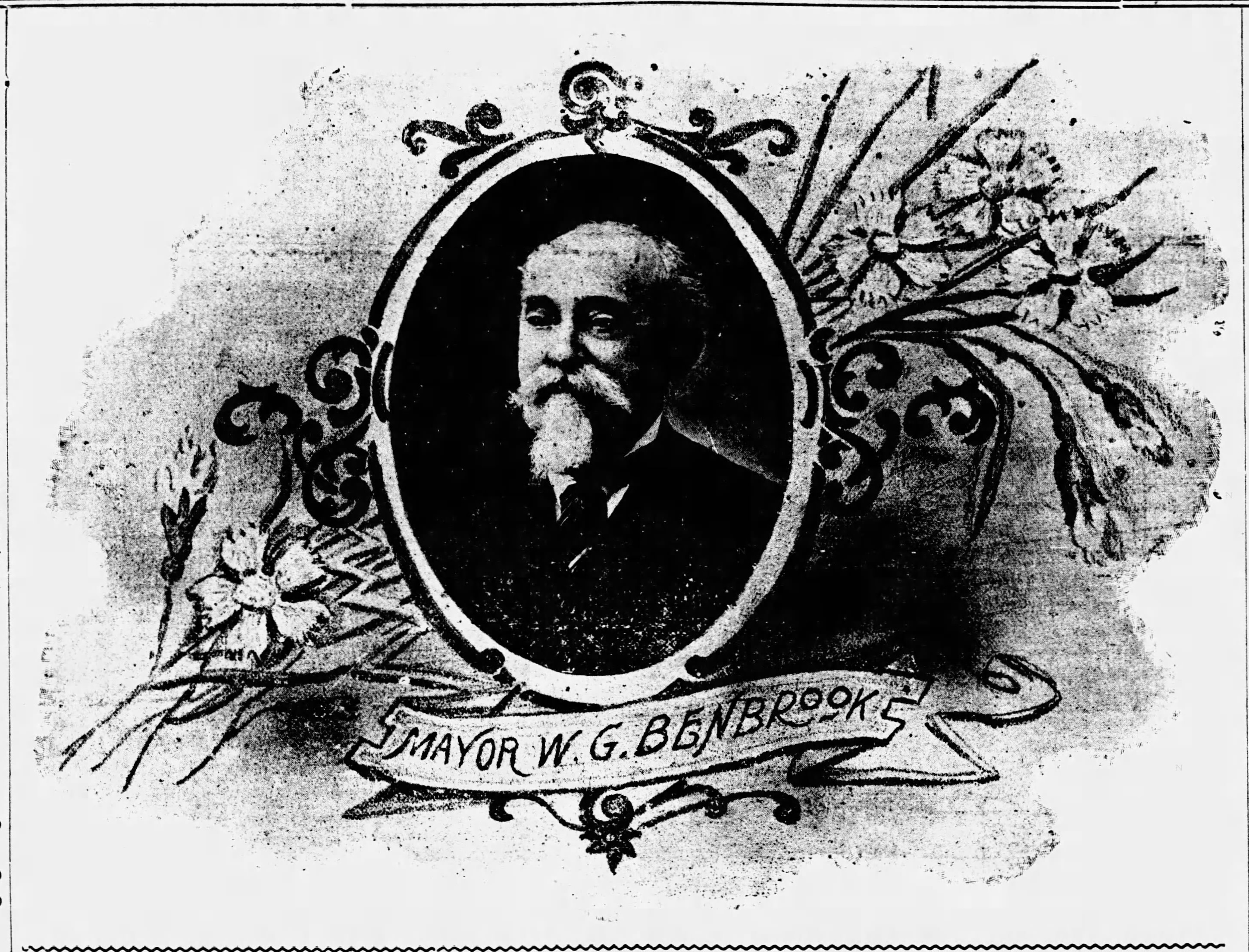
Portrait of Natchez mayor W. G. Benbrook (Natchez Democrat, September 25, 1910)

This is a list of mayors of Natchez, Mississippi, United States.

- 1803 - Samuel Brooks
- 1804 - Samuel Brooks
- 1805 - Samuel Brooks
- 1806 - Samuel Brooks
- 1807 - Samuel Brooks
- 1808 - Samuel Brooks
- 1809 - Samuel Brooks
- 1810 - John Shaw
- 1811 - Samuel Brooks
- 1812 - A. Campbell
- 1813 - A. Campbell
- 1814 - S. Brooks
- 1815 - Edward Turner
- 1816 - Edward Turner
- 1817 - Edward Turner
- 1818 - S. Brooks
- 1819 - Edward Turner
- 1820 - Edward Turner
- 1821 - E. Turner
- 1822 - W. W. Walker
- 1823 - J. H. McComas
- 1824 - J. H. McComas
- 1825 - Wm. Burns, John I. Guion
- 1826 - John I. Guion, W. R. Richards.
- 1827 - Howell Moss, Samuel Postlethwaite
- 1828 - S. Postlethwaite
- 1829 - S. Postlethwaite
- 1830 - S. Postlethwaite
- 1831 - S. Postlethwaite
- 1832 - Eli Montgomery
- 1833 - Eli Montgomery
- 1834 - Eli Montgomery
- 1835 - Eli Montgomery
- 1836 - Cov. Rawlings
- 1837 - C. Rawlings
- 1838 - Henry Tooley
- 1839 - J. A. Lyle
- 1840 - Samuel Cotton
- 1841 - S. Cotton
- 1842 - S. Cotton
- 1843 - John M. Duffield, John R. Stockman
- 1844 - J. R. Stockman
- 1845 - J. R. Stockman
- 1846 - J. R. Stockman
- 1847 - J. R. Stockman
- 1848 - J. R. Stockman
- 1849 - J. R. Stockman
- 1850 - J. R. Stockman
- 1851 - Benedam Pendleton
- 1852 - George J. Dicks
- 1853 - B. Pendleton
- 1854 - Robert W. Wood
- 1855 - Robert W. Wood
- 1856 - Robert W. Wood
- 1857 - Robert W. Wood
- 1858 - Robert W. Wood
- 1859 - John Hunter
- 1860 - "Record not accessible."
- 1861 - John Hunter
- 1862 - John Hunter
- 1863 - John Hunter
- 1864 - William Dix
- 1865 - William Dix
- 1866 - William Dix
- 1867 - William Dix
- 1868 - "Same officers continued in office, until removed by Military Governor in 1869."
- 1869 - John H. Weldon
- 1870 - Robert H. Wood
- 1871 - Robert H. Wood
- 1872 - Robert H. Wood
- 1873 - Henry C. Griffin
- 1874 - Henry C. Griffin
- 1875 - Henry C. Griffin
- 1876 - Henry C. Griffin
- 1877 - Henry C. Griffin
- 1878 - Henry C. Griffin
- 1879 - Henry C. Griffin
- 1880 - Henry C. Griffin
- 1881 - Henry C. Griffin
- 1882 - Henry C. Griffin
- 1883 - Isaac Lowenburg
- 1884 - Isaac Lowenburg
- 1885 - Isaac Lowenburg
- 1886 - Isaac Lowenburg
- 1887 - William H. Mallery
- 1888 - William H. Mallery
- 1889 - William H. Mallery
- 1890 - W. G. Benbrook
- 1891 - W. G. Benbrook
- 1892 - W. G. Benbrook
- 1893 - W. G. Benbrook
- 1894 - W. G. Benbrook
- 1895 - W. G. Benbrook
- 1896 - W. G. Benbrook
- 1897 - W. G. Benbrook
- 1898 - W. G. Benbrook
- 1899 - W. G. Benbrook
- 1900 - W. G. Benbrook
- 1901 - W. G. Benbrook
- 1902 - W. G. Benbrook
- 1903 - W. G. Benbrook
- 1904 - W. G. Benbrook
- 1929–1934 or 1935 – Saul Laub
- Audley B. Connor
- 1951–1956 – Walter P. Abbott
- Troy Watkins

== See also ==
- List of mayors of Vicksburg, Mississippi
