= Red Lick, Mississippi =

- Unincorporated community
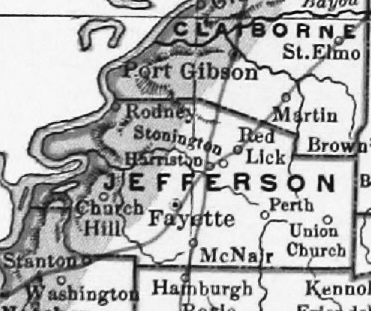
- Jefferson County Mississippi c. 1894

- Location within Mississippi Location within the United States
- Coordinates: 31°47′33″N 90°58′43″W
- Country: United States
- State: Mississippi
- County: Jefferson
- Elevation: 285 ft (87 m)
- Time zone: UTC-6 (Central (CST))
  - Summer (DST): UTC-5 (CDT)
- ZIP code: 39096
- Area code: 601
- GNIS feature ID: 676540

Red Lick is an unincorporated community located in Jefferson County, Mississippi. Red Lick is approximately 5 miles (8.0 km) southeast of Lorman on Mississippi Highway 552.

== History ==
Red Lick was established about 1800 and was named for a buffalo and deer lick on a nearby hill of red clay. Most of the early settlers were from South Carolina. A schoolhouse was in operation from 1836 to 1863.

The Holly Grove Plantation was established north of Red Lick in the 1830s. The Holly Grove Plantation House is listed on the National Register of Historic Places. In 1990, "to prevent demolition by neglect", the house was dismantled and reconstructed 70 miles (110 km) north in Hinds County, Mississippi.

The Beech Hill Methodist Church was the first to establish, and also housed a school. The Red Lick Presbyterian church, also known as the "Brick Church", was erected in 1845, and is still standing. A historic plaque is located there.

The Natchez, Jackson and Columbus Railroad was completed in 1882, and a station was located in Red Lick. Known as "The Little J", the line ran between Jackson and Natchez, and had various owners, including the Illinois Central Railroad, who abandoned the line between 1979 and 1981.

In 1900, Red Lick had a population of 70. By 1907, the settlement had three churches and a money order post office.

In 1950, Red Lick had two stores, two churches, and two sawmills located near the railroad track. The United Vocational High School was located in Red Lick, but it closed in 1958.

Red Lick Records, a mail order supplier of blues and related music located in Porthmadog, Gwynedd, Wales, is named for the settlement.

The New Nation of Islam church is currently located in the settlement.
