= Robert Major Walker =

Mississippi politician (1943 or 1944 – 2025)

- Walker being sworn in as Mayor of Vicksburg

Mayor of Vicksburg, Mississippi
- In office 1988–2001

Personal details
- Born: 1943 or 1944 Vicksburg, Mississippi, U.S.
- Died: July 29, 2025 (aged 81)
- Education: Tougaloo College (BA in Mathematics); Howard University (Master's in Political Science)
- Occupation: Educator, politician

Robert Major Walker (1943 or 1944 – July 29, 2025) was an American politician and educator who served as mayor of Vicksburg, Mississippi. He was the first African American to hold the position and served two terms.

== Early life and education ==
Walker was born in Vicksburg, Mississippi, and attended Jackson State University, where he earned a degree in mathematics and later received a master's degree in political science from University of Mississippi. Before entering politics, he worked as an educator and administrator in the Vicksburg public school system.

== Political career ==
Walker was elected as Vicksburg's mayor in 1988 during a special election, becoming the first African American to hold the office. He was elected to a full term in 1989 and was re-elected in 1992, serving until 2001. During his tenure, Walker advocated for the establishment of a monument honoring African American soldiers who served in the American Civil War, which now stands in the Vicksburg National Military Park.

== Death ==
Walker died on July 29, 2025, at the age of 81.

== Legacy ==
In 2019, the City of Vicksburg renamed its City Hall Annex as the Robert M. Walker Annex to honor his contributions to the city.

== See also ==
- History of Vicksburg, Mississippi
