= Vicksburg, Mississippi =

- City
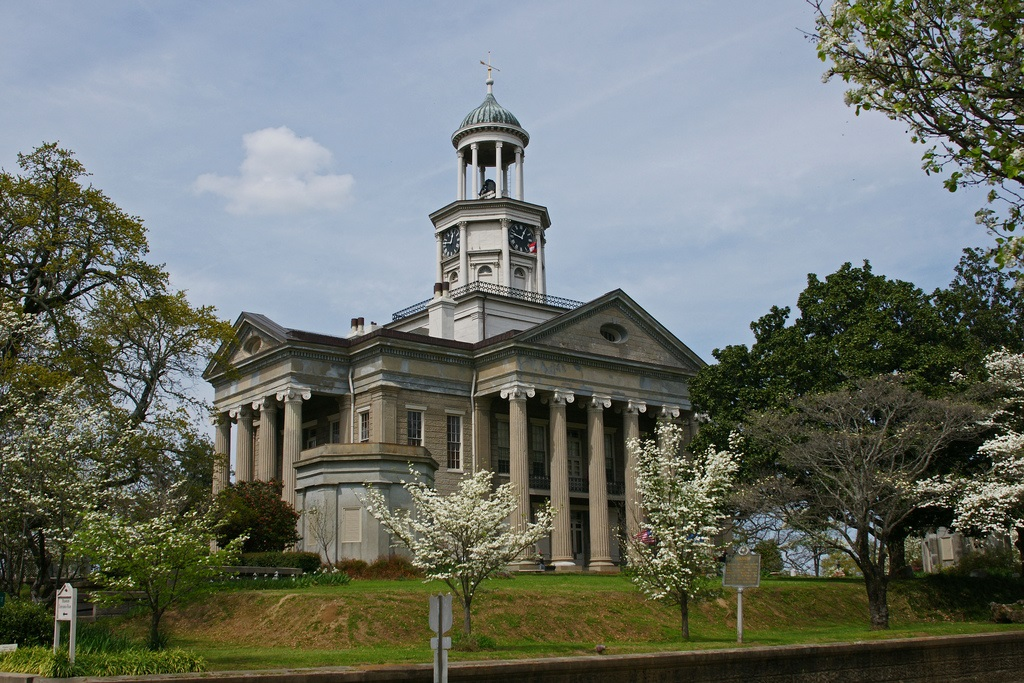
- Old Warren County Courthouse ("Old Courthouse Museum")

- Flag Seal
- Nickname(s): "Gibraltar of the Confederacy", "Red Carpet City of the South"
- Interactive location map of Vicksburg
- Coordinates: 32°21′9″N 90°52′39″W
- Country: United States
- State: Mississippi
- County: Warren
- Founded: 1811
- Incorporated: January 29, 1825
- Named for: Newitt Vick

Government
  - Type: Mayor–council government
  - Mayor: Willis T. Thompson (D)

Area
  - City: 35.093 sq mi (90.890 km^{2})
  - Land: 33.017 sq mi (85.513 km^{2})
  - Water: 2.076 sq mi (5.377 km^{2}) 5.92%
- Elevation: 200 ft (61 m)

Population (2020)
  - City: 21,573
  - Estimate (2024): 20,032
  - Density: 653.40/sq mi (252.28/km^{2})
  - Urban: 25,888
  - Metro: 42,105 (US: 299th)
- Time zone: UTC–6 (Central (CST))
  - Summer (DST): UTC–5 (CDT)
- ZIP Codes: 39180, 39181, 39182, 39183
- Area code(s): 601 and 769
- FIPS code: 28-76720
- Website: vicksburg.org

Vicksburg is a city in and the county seat of Warren County, Mississippi, United States. The population was 21,573 at the 2020 census, and was estimated at 20,032 in 2024. Located on a high bluff on the east bank of the Mississippi River across from Louisiana, Vicksburg was built by French colonists in 1719. The outpost withstood an attack from the native Natchez people. It was incorporated as Vicksburg in 1825 after Methodist missionary Newitt Vick. The area that is now Vicksburg was long occupied by the Natchez as part of their historical territory along the Mississippi. The first Europeans who settled the area were French colonists who built Fort Saint Pierre in 1719 on the high bluffs overlooking the Yazoo River at present-day Redwood. They conducted fur trading with the Natchez and others, and started plantations. During the American Civil War, it was a key Confederate river-port, and its July 1863 surrender to Ulysses S. Grant, along with the concurrent Battle of Gettysburg, marked the turning point of the war.

After the war came the Reconstruction era and then a return to power by white supremacists in 1874 and 1875. Today, Vicksburg's population is majority African American. The city is home to three large installations of the United States Army Corps of Engineers, which has often been involved in local flood control.

== History ==
=== First people ===
The area that is now Vicksburg was long occupied by the Natchez Native Americans as part of their historical territory along the Mississippi. The Natchez spoke a language isolate not related to the Muskogean languages of the other major tribes in the area. Before the Natchez, other indigenous cultures had occupied this strategic area for thousands of years.

=== European settlement ===
The first Europeans who settled the area were French colonists who built Fort Saint Pierre in 1719 on the high bluffs overlooking the Yazoo River at present-day Redwood. They conducted fur trading with the Natchez and others, and started plantations. On 29 November 1729, the Natchez attacked the fort and plantations in and around the present-day city of Natchez. They murdered several hundred settlers, including Jesuit missionary Paul Du Poisson. As was the custom, they violently took a number of women and children as captives, adopting them into their families.

The Natchez War was a disaster for French Louisiana, and the colonial population of the Natchez District never recovered. Aided by the Choctaw, traditional enemies of the Natchez, though, the French defeated and scattered the Natchez and their allies, the Yazoo.

The Choctaw Nation took over the area by right of conquest and inhabited it for several decades. Under pressure from the US government, the Choctaw agreed to cede nearly 2,000,000 acres (8,100 km^{2}) of land to the US under the terms of the Treaty of Fort Adams in 1801. The treaty was the first of a series that eventually led to the removal of most of the Choctaw to Indian Territory west of the Mississippi River in 1830. Some Choctaw remained in Mississippi, citing article XIV of the Treaty of Dancing Rabbit Creek; they became citizens of the state and the United States. They struggled to maintain their culture against the pressure of the binary slave society, which classified people as only white or black.

In 1790, the Spanish founded a military outpost on the site, which they called Fort Nogales (nogales meaning "walnut trees"). When the Americans took possession in 1798 following the American Revolutionary War and a treaty with Spain, they changed the name to Walnut Hills. The small village was incorporated in 1825 as Vicksburg, named after Newitt Vick, a Methodist minister who had established a Protestant mission on the site.

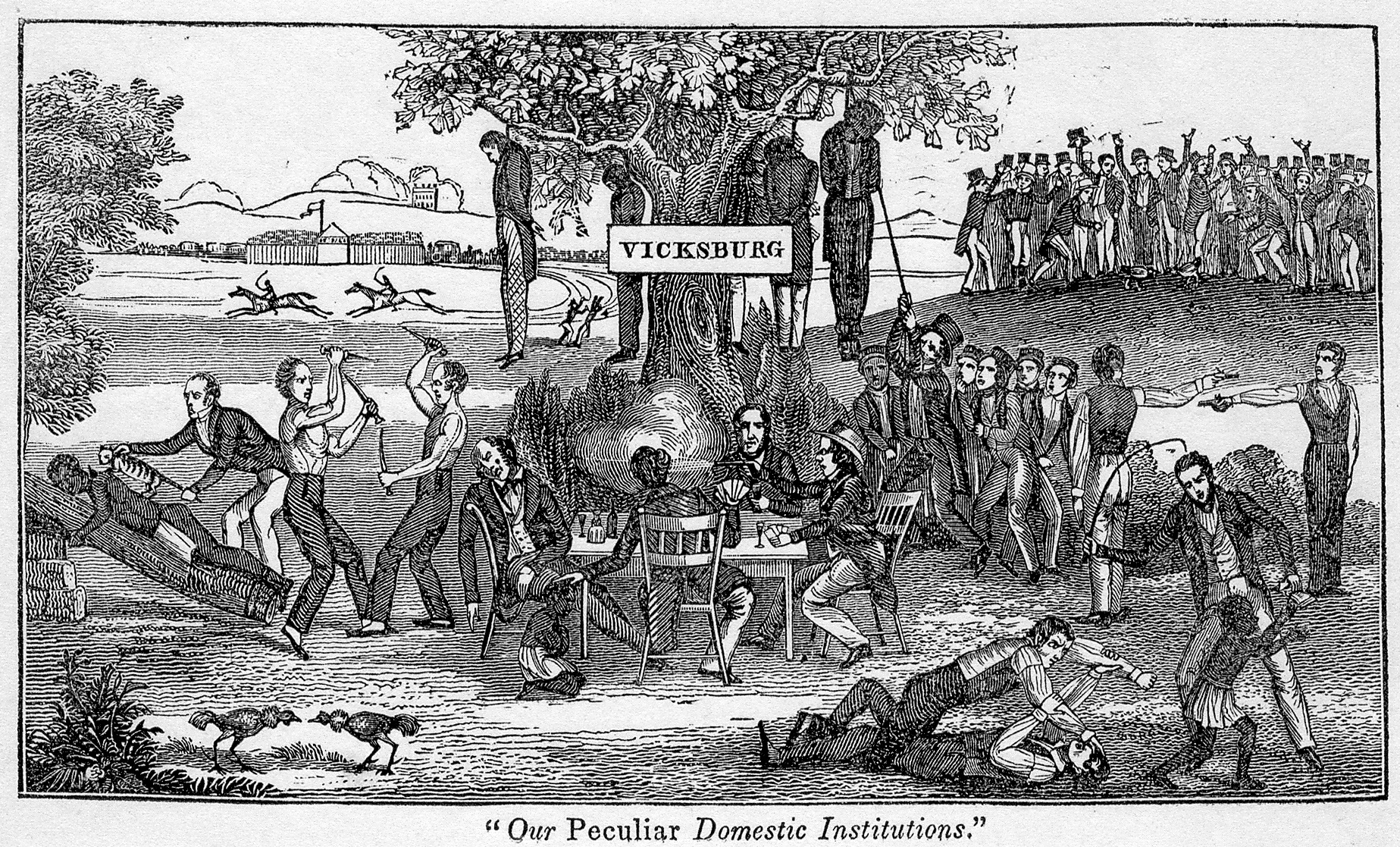
Drawing of the hanging of five gamblers in Vicksburg in 1835

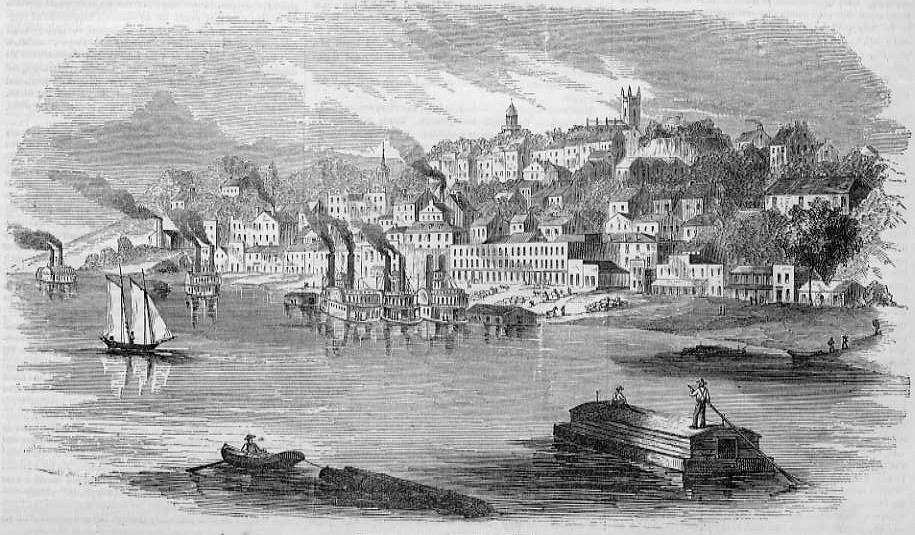
View of Vicksburg in 1855

The town of Vicksburg was incorporated in 1825, with a population of 3,000 people; of which approximately twenty people were Jewish and had immigrated from Bavaria, Prussia, and Alsace–Lorraine.

In 1835, during the Murrell Excitement, a mob from Vicksburg attempted to expel the gamblers from the city, because the citizens were tired of the rougher element treating the city residents with contempt. They captured and hanged five gamblers who had shot and killed a local doctor. Historian Joshua D. Rothman calls this event "the deadliest outbreak of extralegal violence in the slave states between the Southampton Insurrection and the Civil War."

In 1862, fifty Jewish families formed the Hebrew Benevolent Congregation Anshe Chesed in Vicksburg, and received a charter from the state. Two years later in 1864, the Anshe Chesed Cemetery was formed, and it was the second Jewish cemetery in the city; not much is known about the first Jewish cemetery.

The Confederate president, Jefferson Davis, was based at his family plantation at Brierfield, just south of the city.

=== Civil War ===
During the American Civil War (1861–1865), the city finally surrendered during the Siege of Vicksburg, after which the Union Army gained control of the entire Mississippi River. The 47-day siege was intended to starve the city into submission. Its location atop a high bluff overlooking the Mississippi River proved otherwise impregnable to assault by federal troops. The surrender of Vicksburg by Confederate General John C. Pemberton on July 4, 1863, together with the defeat of General Robert E. Lee at Gettysburg the day before, has historically marked the turning point of the Civil War in the Union's favor.

From the surrender of Vicksburg until the end of the war in 1865, the area was under Union military occupation.

Celebrations of the 4th of July, the day of surrender, were irregular until 1947. The Vicksburg Evening Post of July 4, 1883, called July 4 "the day we don't celebrate", and another Vicksburg newspaper, the Daily Commercial Appeal, in 1888 hoped that a political victory would bring an enthusiastic celebration the following year. In 1902, the 4th of July saw only "a parade of colored draymen". In 1947, the Jackson Clarion-Ledger stated that the city of Vicksburg did not celebrate the 4th of July again until 1945, and then it was celebrated as Confederate Carnival Day. A recent scholar disagrees, stating that large Fourth of July celebrations were being held by 1907, and informal celebrations before that. A large parade was held in 1890.

=== Loss of Mississippi access and commercial status ===
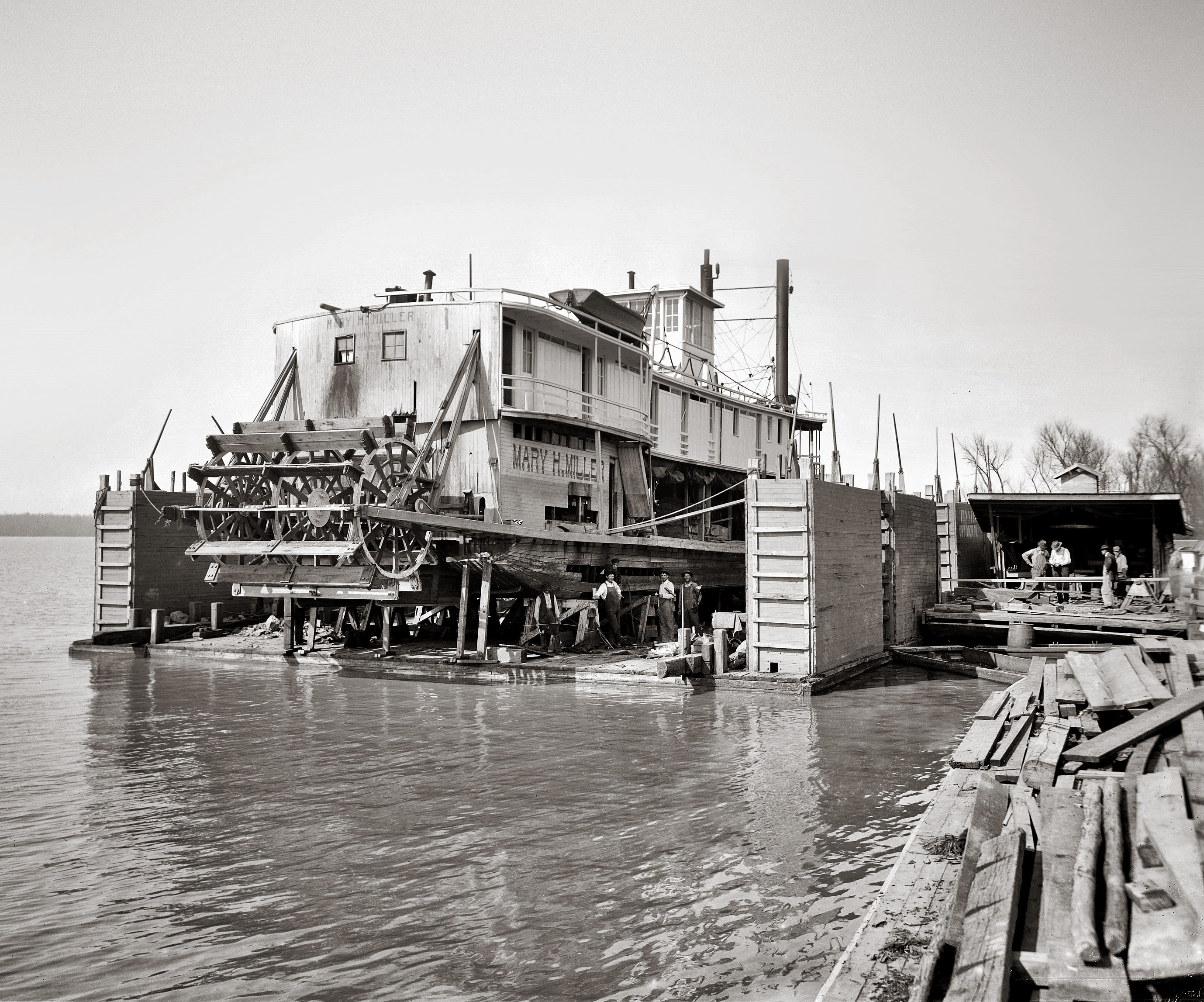
Floating drydock in Vicksburg, circa 1905

Because of Vicksburg's location on the Mississippi River, it built extensive trade from the steamboat traffic in the 19th century. It shipped out cotton coming to it from surrounding counties and was a major trading city in West Central Mississippi.

However, in 1876, a Mississippi River flood cut off the large meander next to Vicksburg through the De Soto Point, which changed the Mississippi River's course away from the city. Vicksburg only retained access to an oxbow lake formed from the old channel of the river, which effectively isolated the city from accessing the Mississippi riverfront. The city's economy suffered greatly due to the lack of a functional river port; Vicksburg would not be a river town again until the completion of the Yazoo Diversion Canal in 1903 by the U.S. Army Corps of Engineers.

=== Political and racial unrest after Civil War ===
In the first few years after the Civil War, white Confederate veterans developed the Ku Klux Klan, beginning in Tennessee; it had chapters throughout the South and attacked freedmen and their supporters. It was suppressed about 1870. By the mid-1870s, new white paramilitary groups had arisen in the Deep South, including the Red Shirts in Mississippi, as whites struggled to regain political and social power over the black majority. Elections were marked by violence and fraud as white Democrats worked to suppress black Republican voting.

In August 1874, a black sheriff, Peter Crosby, was elected in Vicksburg. Letters by a white planter, Batchelor, detail the preparations of whites for what he described as a "race war," including acquisition of the newest Winchester guns. On December 7, 1874, white men disrupted a black Republican meeting celebrating Crosby's victory and held him in custody before running him out of town. He advised blacks from rural areas to return home; along the way, some were attacked by armed whites. During the next several days, armed white mobs swept through black areas, killing other men at home or out in the fields, in what would come to be known as the Vicksburg massacre. Sources differ as to total fatalities, with 29–50 blacks and 2 whites reported dead at the time. Twenty-first-century historian Emilye Crosby estimates that 300 blacks were killed in the city and the surrounding area of Claiborne County, Mississippi. The Red Shirts were active in Vicksburg and other Mississippi areas, and black pleas to the federal government for protection were not met.

At the request of Republican Governor Adelbert Ames, who had left the state during the violence, President Ulysses S. Grant sent federal troops to Vicksburg in January 1875. In addition, a congressional committee investigated what was called the "Vicksburg Riot" at the time (and reported as the "Vicksburg massacre" by northern newspapers.) Testimony from both black and white residents was given, as reported by the New York Times, but no one was ever prosecuted for the deaths. The Red Shirts and other white insurgents suppressed Republican voting by both whites and blacks; smaller-scale riots were staged in the state up to the 1875 elections, at which time white Democrats regained control of a majority of seats in the state legislature.

Under new constitutions, amendments and laws passed between 1890 in Mississippi and 1908 in the remaining southern states, white Democrats disenfranchised most blacks and many poor whites by creating barriers to voter registration, such as poll taxes, literacy tests, and grandfather clauses. They passed Jim Crow laws through which they imposed racial segregation of public facilities. In 1908, a publication documented some of Vicksburg's leading African Americans including lawyer and banker W. E. Mollison.

On March 12, 1894, the popular soft drink Coca-Cola was bottled for the first time in Vicksburg by Joseph A. Biedenharn, a local confectioner. Today, surviving 19th-century Biedenharn soda bottles are prized by collectors of Coca-Cola memorabilia. The original candy store has been renovated and is used as the Biedenharn Coca-Cola Museum.

=== 20th century ===
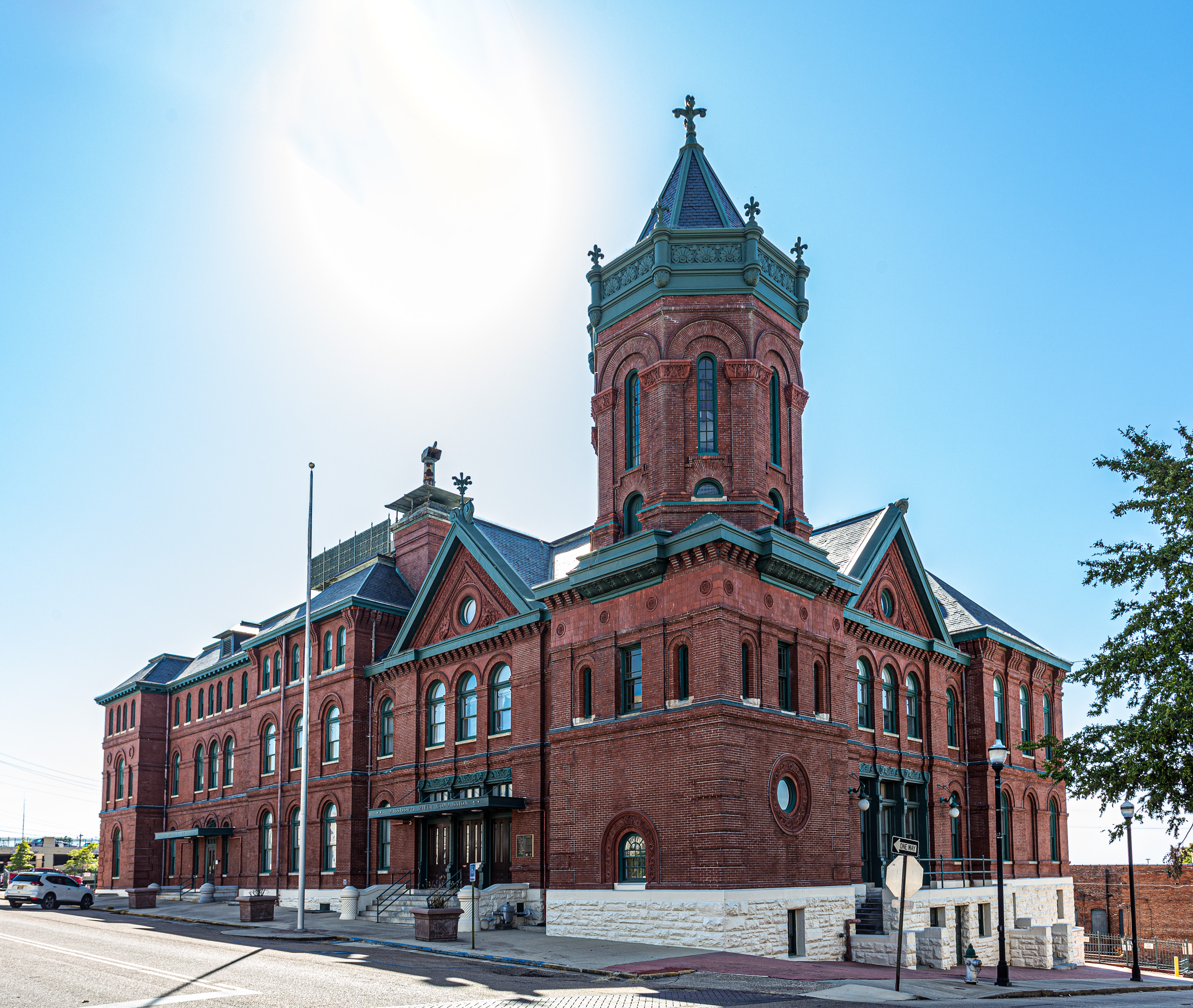
Mississippi River Commission building, built 1894

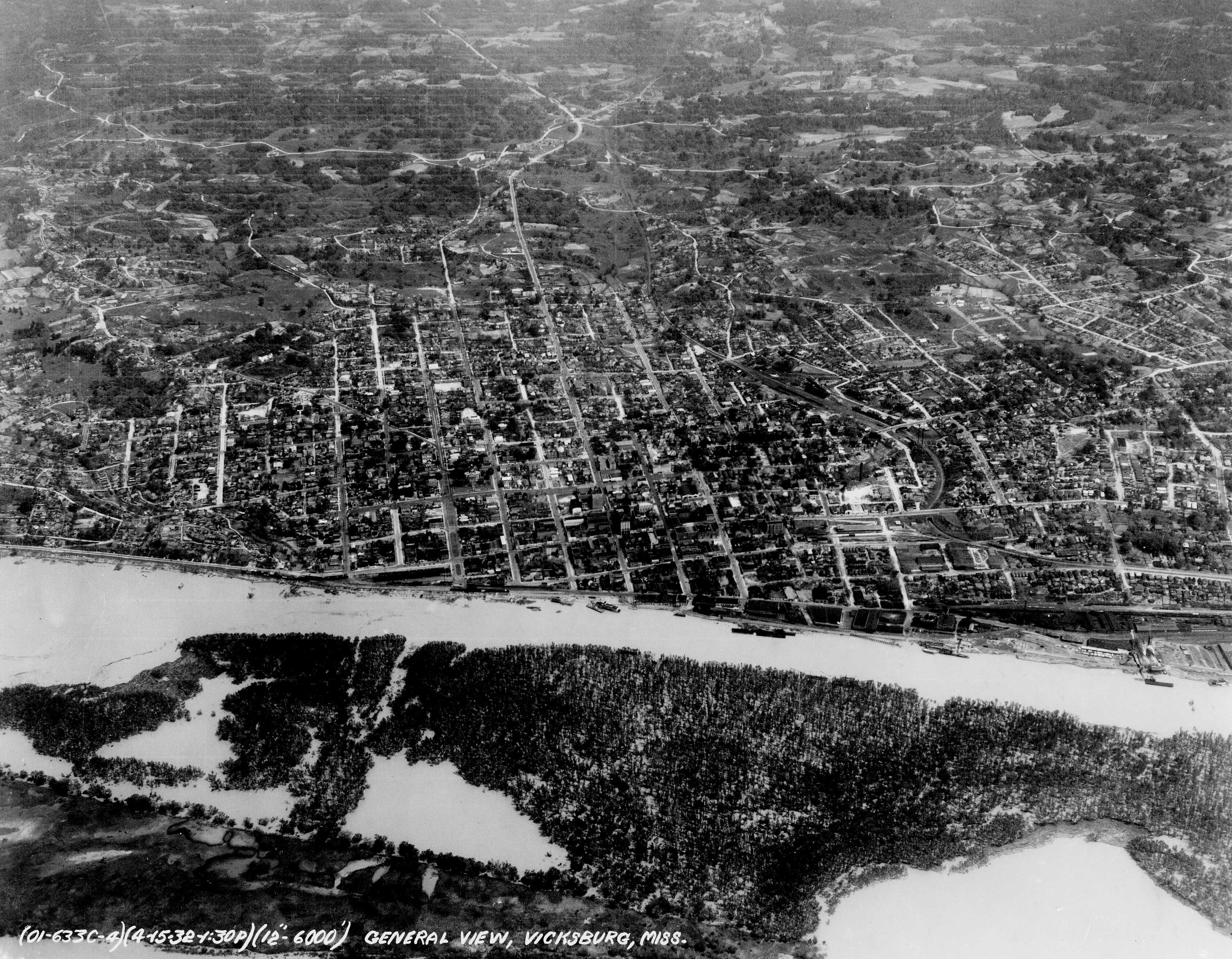
Aerial view, 1932

The exclusion of most blacks from the political system lasted for decades until after Congressional passage of civil rights legislation in the mid-1960s. Lynchings of blacks and other forms of white racial terrorism against them continued to occur in Vicksburg after the start of the 20th century. In May 1903, for instance, two black men charged with murdering a planter were taken from jail by a mob of 200 farmers and lynched before they could go to trial. In May 1919, as many as a thousand white men broke down three sets of steel doors to abduct, hang, burn and shoot a black prisoner, Lloyd Clay, who was falsely accused of raping a white woman. From 1877 to 1950 in Warren County, 14 African Americans were lynched by whites, most in the decades near the turn of the century.

The United States Army Corps of Engineers diverted the Yazoo River in 1903 into the old, shallowing channel to revive the waterfront of Vicksburg. The port city was able to receive steamboats again, but much freight and passenger traffic had moved to railroads, which had become more competitive.

Railroad access to the west across the river continued to be by transfer steamers and ferry barges until a combination railroad-highway bridge was built in 1929. After 1973, Interstate 20 bridged the river. Freight rail traffic still crosses by the old bridge. North-south transportation links are by the Mississippi River and U.S. Highway 61. Vicksburg has the only crossing over the Mississippi River between Greenville and Natchez, and the only interstate highway crossing of the river between Baton Rouge and Memphis.

During the Great Mississippi Flood of 1927, in which hundreds of thousands of acres were inundated, Vicksburg served as the primary gathering point for refugees. Relief parties put up temporary housing, as the flood submerged a large percentage of the Mississippi Delta.

Because of the overwhelming damage from the flood, the US Army Corps of Engineers established the Waterways Experiment Station as the primary hydraulics laboratory, to develop protection of important croplands and cities. Now known as the Engineer Research and Development Center, it applies military engineering, information technology, environmental engineering, hydraulic engineering, and geotechnical engineering to problems of flood control and river navigation.

In December 1953, a severe tornado swept across Vicksburg, causing 38 deaths and destroying nearly 1,000 buildings.

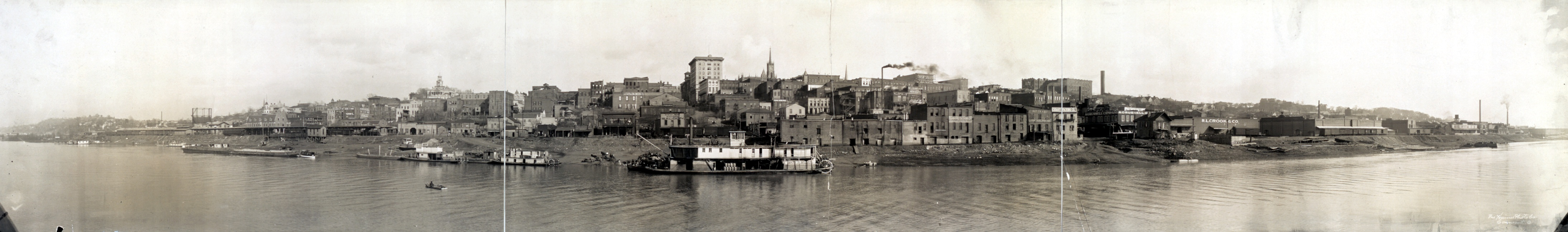
A 1910 panorama

During World War II, cadets from the Royal Air Force, flying from their training base at Terrell, Texas, routinely flew to Vicksburg on training flights. The town served as a stand-in for the British for Cologne, Germany, which is the same distance from London, England as Vicksburg is from Terrell.

Particularly after World War II, in which many blacks served, returning veterans began to be active in the civil rights movement, wanting to have full citizenship after fighting in the war. In Mississippi, activists in the Vicksburg Movement became prominent during the 1960s.

=== Early 21st century ===
In 2001, a group of Vicksburg residents visited the Paducah, Kentucky, mural project, looking for ideas for their own community development. In 2002, the Vicksburg Riverfront murals program was begun by Louisiana mural artist Robert Dafford and his team on the floodwall located on the waterfront in downtown. Subjects for the murals were drawn from the history of Vicksburg and the surrounding area. They include President Theodore Roosevelt's bear hunt, the Sultana, the Sprague, the Siege of Vicksburg, the Kings Crossing site, Willie Dixon, the Flood of 1927, the 1953 Vicksburg, Mississippi tornado, Rosa A. Temple High School (known for integration activism) and the Vicksburg National Military Park. The project was finished in 2009 with the completion of the Jitney Jungle/Glass Kitchen mural.

In the fall of 2010, a new 55-foot mural was painted on a section of wall on Grove Hill across the street from the original project by former Dafford muralists Benny Graeff and Herb Roe. The mural's subject is the annual "Run thru History" held in the Vicksburg National Military Park.

On December 6–7, 2014, a symposium was held on the 140th anniversary of the 1874 riots. A variety of scholars gave papers and an open panel discussion was held on the second day at the Vicksburg National Military Park, in collaboration with the Jacqueline House African American Museum.

== Geography ==
According to the United States Census Bureau, the city has a total area of 35.093 square miles (90.89 km^{2}), of which 33.017 square miles (85.51 km^{2}) is land and 2.076 square miles (5.38 km^{2}) (5.92%) is water.

Vicksburg is located at the confluence of the Mississippi and Yazoo Rivers. Much of the city is on top of a high bluff on the east bank of the Mississippi River. Vicksburg is also served by Interstate 20. The interstate opens Vicksburg with a cloverleaf interchange that heads out to U.S. Route 61 North towards Rolling Fork, Mississippi, Clarksdale, Mississippi, and stretches out for another 77 miles towards Memphis, Tennessee. On the south part of the exit, it heads on Mississippi Highway 27 towards Utica, Mississippi. As the interstate goes on it makes interchanges with Clay Street, Indiana Avenue, and Halls Ferry Road. After the downtown interchanges are over, before finally crossing in Louisiana with a cloverleaf interchange, I-20 makes a directional T interchange with US-61, and US-61 heads south toward Port Gibson, Mississippi, Natchez, Mississippi, and then continues for another 92 miles into Baton Rouge, Louisiana, Louisiana's capital city. Interstate 20 then continues to head west towards Monroe, Louisiana, Shreveport, Louisiana, Dallas, and lastly after 445 miles, making a trumpet interchange with Interstate 10 in Toyah, Texas.

=== Climate ===
Vicksburg has a humid subtropical climate with mild winters and hot, humid summers.

Climate data for Vicksburg, Mississippi (Vicksburg – Tallulah Regional Airport) 1991–2020 normals, extremes 1948–present
Month	Jan	Feb	Mar	Apr	May	Jun	Jul	Aug	Sep	Oct	Nov	Dec	Year
Record high °F (°C)	85 (29)	87 (31)	89 (32)	92 (33)	97 (36)	102 (39)	104 (40)	107 (42)	105 (41)	98 (37)	89 (32)	85 (29)	107 (42)
Mean maximum °F (°C)	75.7 (24.3)	78.7 (25.9)	83.4 (28.6)	87.2 (30.7)	91.5 (33.1)	95.1 (35.1)	97.4 (36.3)	98.2 (36.8)	96.0 (35.6)	90.4 (32.4)	82.4 (28.0)	77.6 (25.3)	99.4 (37.4)
Mean daily maximum °F (°C)	57.2 (14.0)	61.9 (16.6)	69.6 (20.9)	76.9 (24.9)	84.3 (29.1)	90.2 (32.3)	92.6 (33.7)	92.8 (33.8)	88.4 (31.3)	79.1 (26.2)	67.8 (19.9)	59.6 (15.3)	76.7 (24.8)
Daily mean °F (°C)	47.6 (8.7)	51.8 (11.0)	59.1 (15.1)	66.2 (19.0)	73.9 (23.3)	80.4 (26.9)	82.8 (28.2)	82.4 (28.0)	77.2 (25.1)	66.6 (19.2)	55.9 (13.3)	49.7 (9.8)	66.1 (18.9)
Mean daily minimum °F (°C)	37.9 (3.3)	41.7 (5.4)	48.7 (9.3)	55.5 (13.1)	63.5 (17.5)	70.6 (21.4)	73.1 (22.8)	72.0 (22.2)	66.1 (18.9)	54.0 (12.2)	44.0 (6.7)	39.7 (4.3)	55.6 (13.1)
Mean minimum °F (°C)	20.2 (−6.6)	25.6 (−3.6)	30.3 (−0.9)	38.5 (3.6)	48.7 (9.3)	59.6 (15.3)	65.7 (18.7)	63.5 (17.5)	51.2 (10.7)	35.7 (2.1)	26.5 (−3.1)	23.0 (−5.0)	18.3 (−7.6)
Record low °F (°C)	−2 (−19)	−12 (−24)	11 (−12)	28 (−2)	37 (3)	47 (8)	54 (12)	52 (11)	34 (1)	22 (−6)	15 (−9)	4 (−16)	−12 (−24)
Average precipitation inches (mm)	5.44 (138)	5.11 (130)	5.02 (128)	5.96 (151)	3.85 (98)	3.74 (95)	4.05 (103)	3.75 (95)	3.00 (76)	4.13 (105)	3.92 (100)	5.38 (137)	53.35 (1,356)
Average precipitation days (≥ 0.01 in)	9.3	10.1	9.9	8.4	9.5	9.1	9.7	9.4	6.8	7.5	8.7	10.1	108.5
Source: NOAA

== Demographics ==
Historical population
Census	Pop.	Note	%±
1850	3,678		—
1860	4,591		24.8%
1870	12,443		171.0%
1880	11,814		−5.1%
1890	13,373		13.2%
1900	14,834		10.9%
1910	20,814		40.3%
1920	18,072		−13.2%
1930	22,943		27.0%
1940	24,460		6.6%
1950	27,948		14.3%
1960	29,143		4.3%
1970	25,478		−12.6%
1980	25,434		−0.2%
1990	20,908		−17.8%
2000	26,407		26.3%
2010	23,856		−9.7%
2020	21,573		−9.6%
2024 (est.)	20,032	▼	−7.1%
U.S. Decennial Census; 2020 Census

=== Racial and ethnic composition ===
Vicksburg, Mississippi – racial and ethnic composition Note: the US Census treats Hispanic/Latino as an ethnic category. This table excludes Latinos from the racial categories and assigns them to a separate category. Hispanics/Latinos may be of any race.
Race / ethnicity (NH = non-Hispanic)	Pop. 1990	Pop. 2000	Pop. 2010	Pop 2020	% 1990	% 2000	% 2010	% 2020
White alone (NH)	8,437	9,873	7,301	5,974	40.35%	37.39%	30.60%	27.69%
Black or African American alone (NH)	12,290	15,892	15,715	14,423	58.78%	60.18%	65.87%	66.86%
Native American or Alaska Native alone (NH)	13	40	41	27	0.06%	0.15%	0.17%	0.13%
Asian alone (NH)	59	157	210	209	0.28%	0.59%	0.88%	0.97%
Native Hawaiian or Pacific Islander alone (NH)	—	2	8	0	—	0.01%	0.03%	0.00%
Other race alone (NH)	6	25	9	48	0.03%	0.09%	0.04%	0.22%
Mixed race or multiracial (NH)	—	144	163	489	—	0.55%	0.68%	2.27%
Hispanic or Latino (any race)	103	274	409	403	0.49%	1.04%	1.71%	1.87%
Total	20,908	26,407	23,856	21,573	100.00%	100.00%	100.00%	100.00%

=== 2020 census ===
As of the 2020 census, Vicksburg had a population of 21,573, with 9,277 households and 5,317 families residing in the city. The population density was 653.46 inhabitants per square mile (252.3/km^{2}).

The median age was 39.3 years. 23.9% of residents were under the age of 18 and 17.9% of residents were 65 years of age or older. For every 100 females there were 85.6 males, and for every 100 females age 18 and over there were 80.2 males age 18 and over.

92.1% of residents lived in urban areas, while 7.9% lived in rural areas.

Of the 9,277 households, 29.9% had children under the age of 18 living in them. 25.7% were married-couple households, 22.9% were households with a male householder and no spouse or partner present, and 45.8% were households with a female householder and no spouse or partner present. About 39.0% of all households were made up of individuals and 15.4% had someone living alone who was 65 years of age or older.

There were 10,967 housing units at an average density of 332.20 per square mile (128.3/km^{2}), of which 15.4% were vacant. The homeowner vacancy rate was 2.0% and the rental vacancy rate was 10.5%.

Racial composition as of the 2020 census
Race	Number	Percent
White	6,075	28.2%
Black or African American	14,499	67.2%
American Indian and Alaska Native	33	0.2%
Asian	210	1.0%
Native Hawaiian and Other Pacific Islander	0	0.0%
Some other race	138	0.6%
Two or more races	618	2.9%

=== Housing market ===
According to realtor website Zillow, the average price of a home as of October 31, 2025, in Vicksburg is $137,869.

=== 2023 American Community Survey ===
As of the 2023 American Community Survey, there are 8,158 estimated households in Vicksburg with an average of 2.50 persons per household. The city has a median household income of $42,484. Approximately 27.9% of the city's population lives at or below the poverty line. Vicksburg has an estimated 50.1% employment rate, with 23.9% of the population holding a bachelor's degree or higher and 84.8% holding a high school diploma.

=== Languages ===
The top five reported languages (people were allowed to report up to two languages, thus the figures will generally add to more than 100%) were English (96.1%), Spanish (2.4%), Indo-European (1.3%), Asian and Pacific Islander (0.1%), and Other (0.1%).

== Economy ==
The city is home to three large US Army Corps of Engineers installations: the Engineer Research and Development Center (ERDC), which also houses the ERDC's Waterways Experiment Station; the Mississippi Valley Division headquarters; and the Vicksburg District headquarters.

The 412th Engineer Command of the US Army Reserve and the 168th Engineer Brigade of the Mississippi Army National Guard are also located in Vicksburg.

The United States Coast Guard's 8th District/Lower Mississippi River sector has an Aids To Navigation unit located in Vicksburg, operating the buoy tending vessel USCGC Kickapoo.

In 2017, Emma Green of The Atlantic stated, "The Army Corps of Engineers sustains the town economically". 12.3% of the local workforce is employed by the federal government.

=== Casinos ===
Vicksburg is the home of four casinos along the Mississippi River.

- Ameristar Casino Vicksburg
- Casino Vicksburg (formerly Lady Luck Casino Vicksburg)
- Riverwalk Casino Hotel
- Water View Casino

== Arts and culture ==
=== Annual cultural events ===
Every summer, Vicksburg plays host to the Miss Mississippi Pageant and Parade. Also every summer, the Vicksburg Homecoming Benevolent Club hosts a homecoming weekend/reunion that provides scholarships to graduating high-school seniors. Former residents from across the country return for the event.

Every summer since 1936, Vicksburg Theatre Guild has hosted Gold in the Hills, which holds the Guinness World Record for longest-running show.

=== Places of interest ===
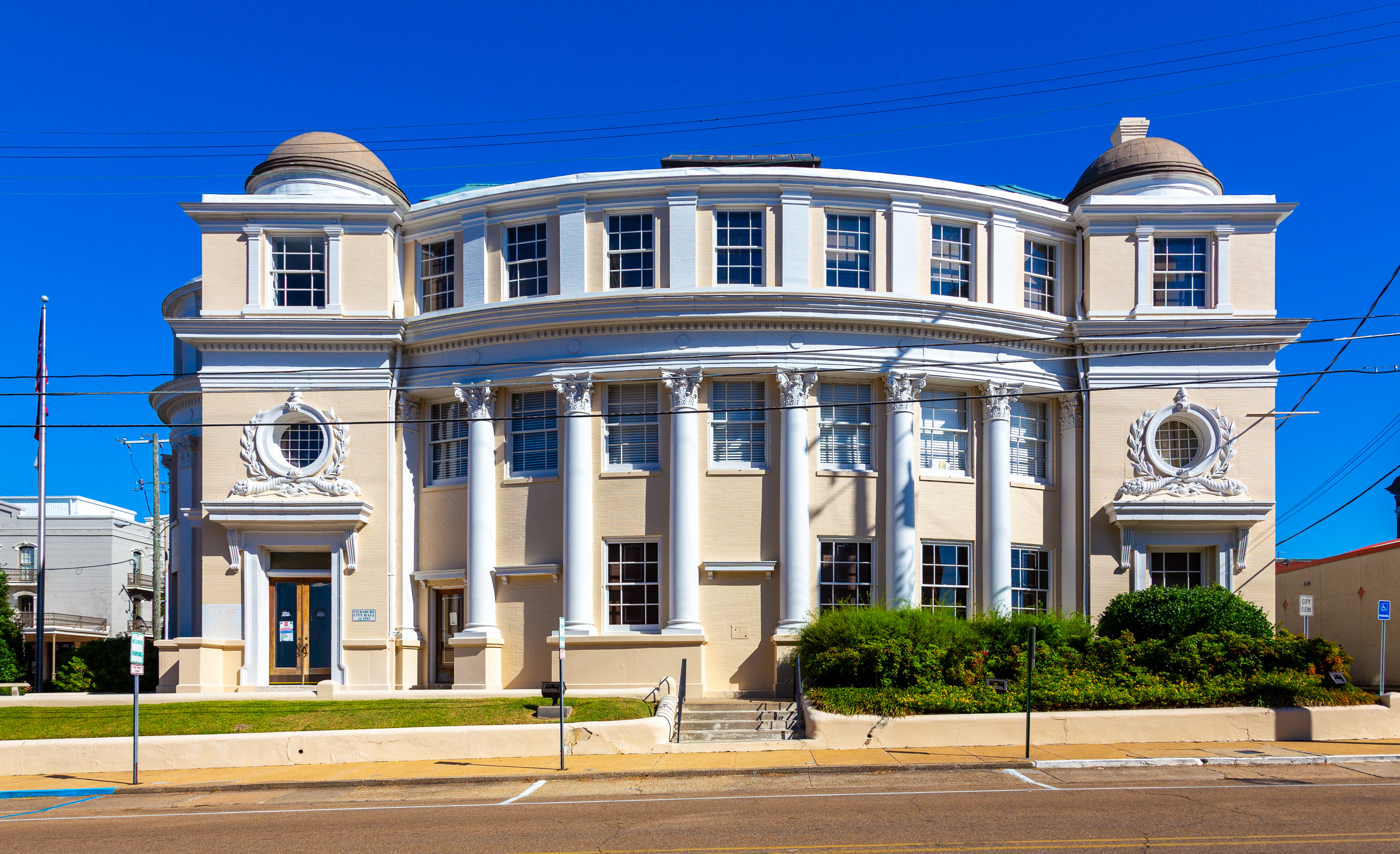
Vicksburg City Hall, by architect James Riely Gordon

- Vicksburg City Hall, a 1902 Beaux-Arts Classical Revival style, by architect James Riely Gordon.
- Anchuca Mansion (1830)
- Balfour House (1835)
- Beck House (1875)
- The Magnolias (c. 1877–1880)
- McRaven House (c. 1797)
- Old Court House Museum (1861)
- Vicksburg National Military Park
  - Pemberton's Headquarters
  - U.S.S. Cairo Gunboat & Museum
- Vicksburg Riverfront Murals (2002, 2012)
- Vicksburg Theatre Guild

== Government ==
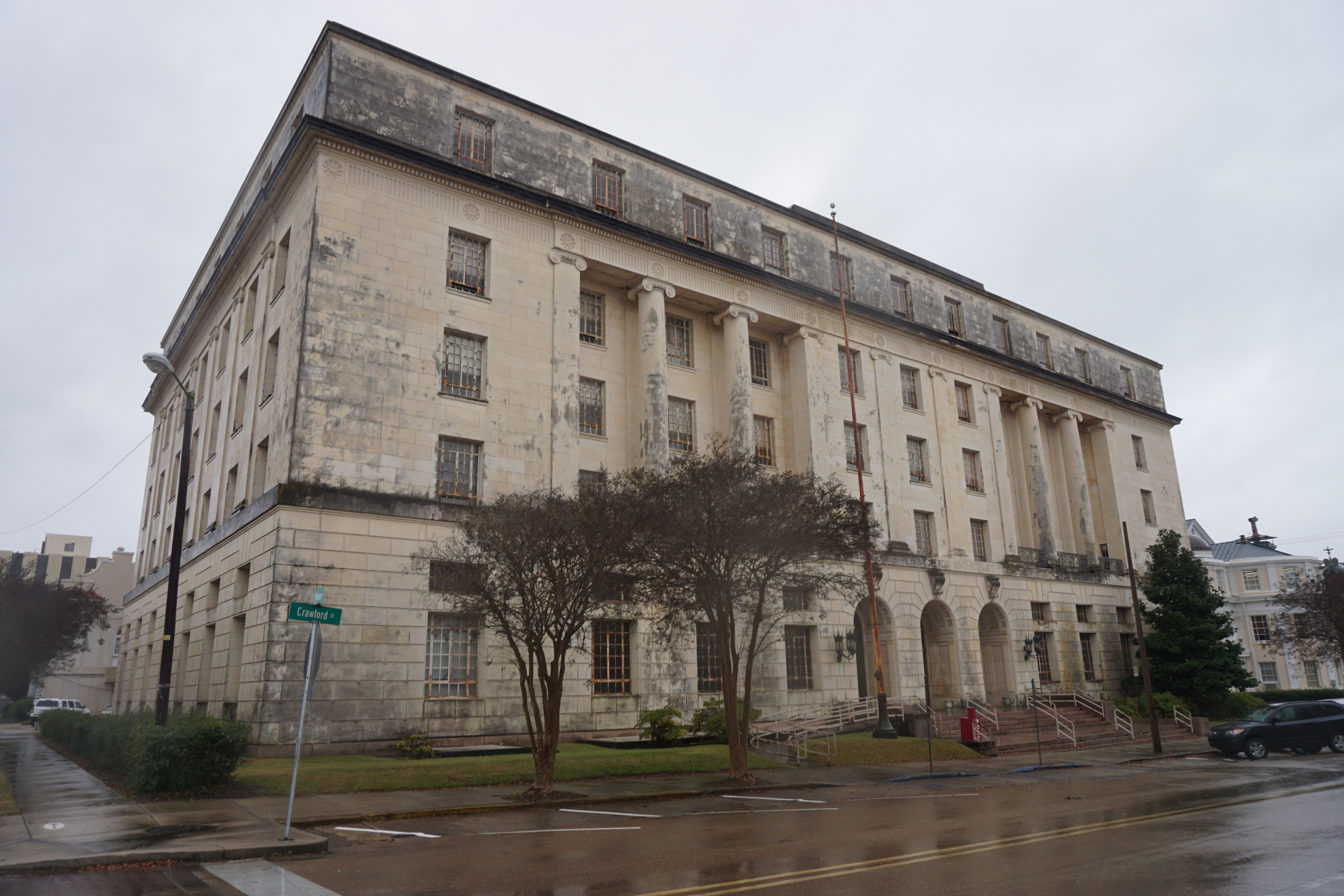
U.S. Post Office (former) and Courthouse in Vicksburg

The city government consists of a mayor who is elected at-large and two aldermembers elected from single-member districts, known as wards. The current mayor is Willis Thompson, who defeated former mayor George Flaggs Jr. in the June 2025 election.

Past mayors include Johnnie Holland 1957–1968 and Nat Bullard 1973–1977. Robert Major Walker was elected the city's first African American mayor in a special election in 1988 and was re-elected in 1989. He was succeeded by Joe Loviza who served 1993–1997. Walker was re-elected in 1997.

In 2021 the mayor got a $20,000 pay raise.

== Education ==
=== K-12 schools ===
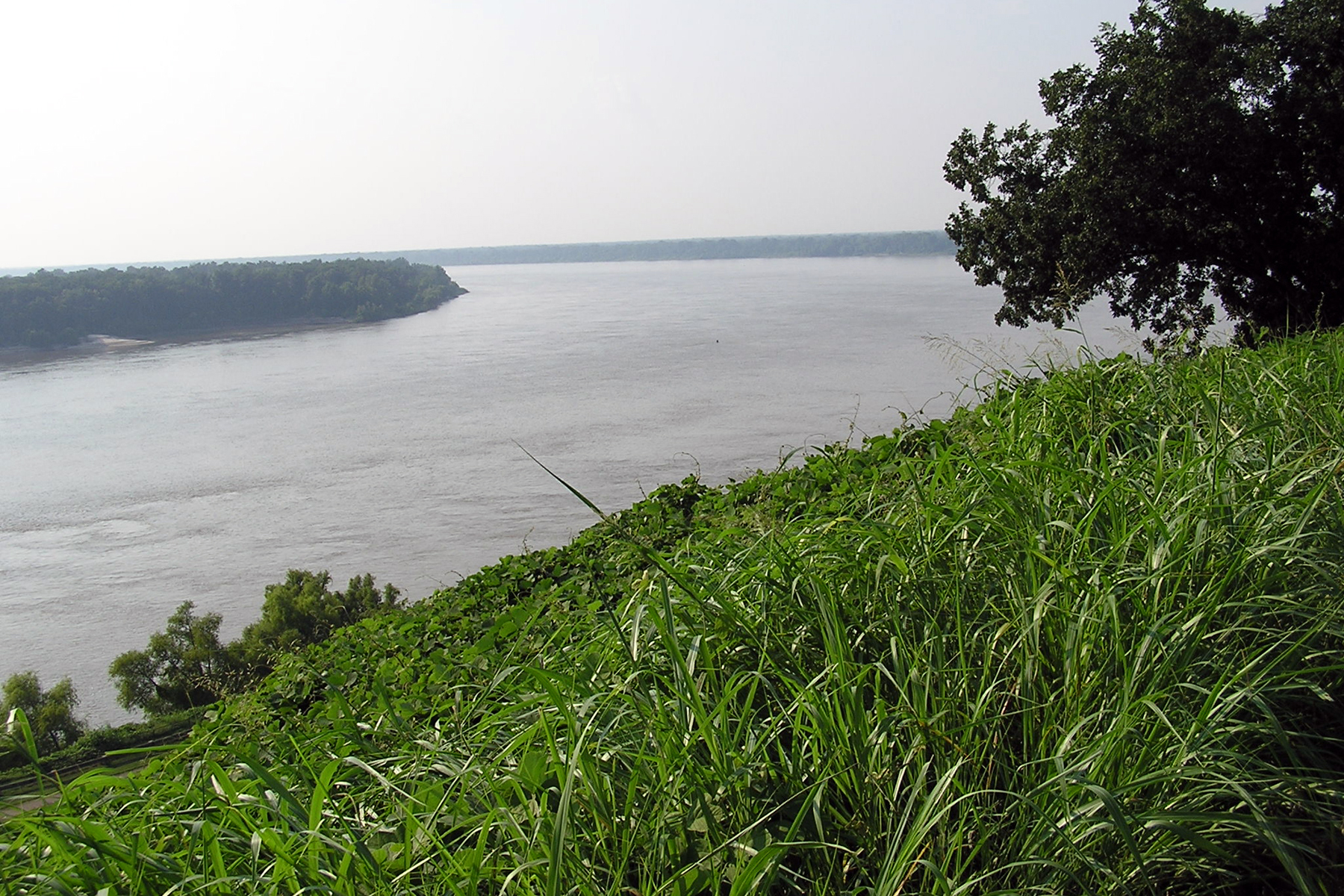
Mississippi River at Vicksburg

The City of Vicksburg is served by the Vicksburg-Warren School District.

High schools

- Vicksburg High School
  - 1988–1989 National Blue Ribbon School
- Warren Central High School

Junior high schools

- Vicksburg Junior High School
- Warren Central Junior High School
- Academy of Innovation

Elementary schools

- Beechwood Elementary School
- Bovina Elementary School
- Bowmar Avenue Magnet School
- Dana Road Elementary School
- Redwood Elementary School
- Sherman Avenue Elementary School
- South Park Elementary School
- Warrenton Elementary School
- Vicksburg Intermediate School
- Warren Central Intermediate School

Private schools

- Porters Chapel Academy
- Vicksburg Catholic School - St. Francis Xavier Elementary and Saint Aloysius Catholic High School (of the Roman Catholic Diocese of Jackson)
- Vicksburg Christian Academy
- Vicksburg Community School (K-12)

Former schools

- Hall's Ferry Road Elementary School
  - 1985–1986, National Blue Ribbon School
- Culkin Elementary School
- Jett Elementary School
- Cedars Elementary School
- Vicksburg Middle School
- All Saints' Episcopal School was a local boarding school located on Confederate Avenue, which closed in 2006 after 98 years in operation. The historic school is now a regional campus for AmeriCorps NCCC.
- St. Mary's Catholic School served the African-American community.
- McIntyre Elementary School served the African-American community.
- Magnolia Avenue School serviced the African-American community and was renamed Bowman High School to honor a former principal.
- Rosa A. Temple High School served the African-American community.
- King's Elementary School served the African-American community.
- Carr Central High School.
- J.H. Culkin Academy (grades 1-12 until 1965, thereafter Culkin Elementary School).
- H.V. Cooper High School. First graduating class 1959.
- Jefferson Davis School.
- Oak Ridge School.
- Eliza Fox School (a.k.a. Grove Street School).
- All Saints' College. An Episcopal college for white women. Opened in 1908 and closed in 1962.

=== Colleges and universities ===
Warren County is in the district of Hinds Community College.

== Media ==
=== Newspapers ===
- The Vicksburg Daily News
- The Vicksburg Post, formerly the Vicksburg Evening Post.

== Transportation ==
The Yazoo and Mississippi Valley Railroad and then the Illinois Central Railroad for several decades had passenger service through the city, at two different stations, one on Levee Street, and the other on Cherry Street. The IC's Planter went north to Memphis, Tennessee and south to New Orleans. The Chery Street station hosted the Northeastern Limited and an unnamed train east to Jackson and Meridian (sleeping car passengers could continue to New York; coach passengers could transfer at Meridian's Union Station to an Atlanta and New York bound train there), and the Southwestern Limited and another train west to Monroe and Shreveport's Union Station. The final train serving Vicksburg was the Southwestern Limited/Northeastern Limited in 1967.

Interstate 20 runs east–west through the southern part of Vicksburg. U.S. Highway 80 runs east–west through the city. U.S. Highway 61 runs north–south through the city.

The nearest airport with commercial flights is Jackson–Medgar Wiley Evers International Airport, 53.2 miles to the east of Vicksburg. Vicksburg Tallulah Regional Airport and Vicksburg Municipal Airport, to the west and to the south of Vicksburg, are, on the other hand, two general aviation airports.

== Notable people ==
- William Wirt Adams, Confederate Army officer and member of the Mississippi House of Representatives
- Katherine Bailess, actress, singer and dancer
- Earle Basinsky, crime novelist
- Ed Bearss (1923–2020), American Civil War historian
- Joseph A. Biedenharn (1866–1952), entrepreneur: first bottled Coca-Cola in 1894 in Vicksburg
- Johnny Brewer, football player
- Margaret Hunt Brisbane (1858–1925), poet
- Roosevelt Brown, former Major League Baseball outfielder for the Chicago Cubs
- Ellis Burks, former MLB outfielder
- Charles Burnett, filmmaker
- Malcolm Butler, cornerback for the New England Patriots and Tennessee Titans
- Odia Coates, pop singer
- Rod Coleman, defensive tackle for the Atlanta Falcons
- Caroline Russell Compton, Mississippi artist
- Mart Crowley, playwright, TV executive
- Jefferson Davis, President of the Confederate States of America
- Bobby DeLaughter, Mississippi state judge and prosecutor
- Willie Dixon, blues bassist, singer, songwriter, and producer
- John "Kayo" Dottley, college and professional football player
- Myrlie Evers-Williams, civil rights activist and journalist
- Charley Fuller, former NFL running back
- Mark Gray, country music singer, born in Vicksburg
- Louis Green, linebacker for the Denver Broncos
- DeMichael Harris, wide receiver for the Indianapolis Colts
- Milt Hinton, jazz bassist
- Jay Hopson, football head coach, University of Southern Mississippi
- Joseph Holt, longest-serving Judge Advocate General of the Army
- Delbert Hosemann Jr., Lt Governor of Mississippi
- Hank Jones, jazz pianist, born in Vicksburg
- Martin F. Jue, amateur radio products inventor, entrepreneur
- Patrick Kelly, fashion designer
- Brad Leggett, football player, Seattle Seahawks
- George McConnell, former guitarist for Widespread Panic, Kudzu Kings, and Beanland
- William Michael Morgan, country music singer
- Michael Myers, defensive tackle for the Cincinnati Bengals
- Key Pittman, U.S. Senator from Nevada, 1913–40; born in Vicksburg
- Vail M. Pittman, 19th governor of Nevada
- Dave Plump, former NFL defensive back, San Diego Chargers
- Evelyn Preer, African-American film actress
- George Reed former running back for the Canadian Football League
- Beah Richards, African-American film and television actress
- Kee Sloan, Episcopal priest and eleventh Bishop of Alabama
- William A. Stanton (1870–1948), architect
- Roy C. Strickland, businessman and politician in Louisiana and Texas
- Taylor Tankersley, Florida Marlins relief pitcher
- John Thomas, former MLB player
- Mary T. Washington, the first African-American woman CPA
- Carl Westcott, entrepreneur, founder of 1-800-Flowers and Westcott Communications
- James E. Winfield (1944–2000), civil rights attorney, city prosecutor, and politician
- Delmon Young, outfielder for the Philadelphia Phillies
- Dmitri Young, first baseman for the Washington Nationals
- Jaelyn Young, pleaded guilty to charges relating to her attempts to join ISIS

== Cultural references ==
- Vicksburg is mentioned in the Pulitzer Prize winning play Crimes of the Heart by Beth Henley.
- Several delta blues songs mention Vicksburg, including Charley Patton's "High Water Everywhere" and Robert Johnson's "Traveling Riverside Blues".
- The city is mentioned multiple times in the series of books surrounding the Logan family, including Roll of Thunder, Hear My Cry (1976) and Let The Circle Be Unbroken (1981), by Mildred Taylor.
- A made-for-TV movie version of I Know Why the Caged Bird Sings, based on Maya Angelou's memoir, was filmed in Vicksburg.
- O Brother, Where Art Thou? was filmed in Vicksburg. The Stokes campaign dinner was filmed in the Southern Cultural Heritage Center's auditorium.
- The hospital stairway scene from Mississippi Burning was filmed in the Southern Cultural Heritage Convent (with Gene Hackman and Willem Dafoe).
- Vicksburg is featured in Robert A. Heinlein's 1982 science fiction novel Friday as a town in the Lone Star Republic, a leading smugglers' port between Texas and the Chicago Imperium. The book's protagonist Friday Baldwin stayed there, particularly in the riverfront Lowtown, while trying to find a way into the Imperium.
- In the novel Underground to Canada the protagonists Julilly and Liza are slaves on a cotton plantation near Vicksburg.
- Vicksburg was the focus of four episodes of the American television series Ghost Adventures during Season 19, with one episode dedicated to Champion Hill Battlefield.
- On Elton John's 1974 album Caribou, the song "Dixy Lily" contains the lyrics "Down from Louisiana on the Vicksburg run." in the chorus.
- Vicksburg is mentioned in Mississippi Queen by Mountain.

== See also ==
- USS Vicksburg, 5 ships
- Anchor Line, a prominent steamboat company on the Mississippi River from 1859 to 1898, which operated a steamboat called City of Vicksburg
