= Fort St. Pierre Site =

- U.S. National Register of Historic Places
- U.S. National Historic Landmark
- Location within Mississippi Location within the United States
- Nearest city: Vicksburg, Mississippi
- Coordinates: 32°29′44.49″N 90°47′54.72″W
- Built: 1719
- NRHP reference No.: 00000263

Significant dates
- Added to NRHP: February 16, 2000
- Designated NHL: February 16, 2000

Fort St. Pierre was a colonial French fortified outpost on the Yazoo River in what is now Warren County, Mississippi. Also known as Fort St. Claude and the Yazoo Post, it was established in 1719 and served as the northernmost outpost on the Eastern Banks of The Mississippi River in Lower French Louisiana. It was destroyed in 1729 by Native Americans and was not rebuilt. Its location, north of Vicksburg on the east bank of the river, was discovered by archaeologists in the 1970s, and was given the Smithsonian trinomial 23-M-5. It was declared a National Historic Landmark in 2000.

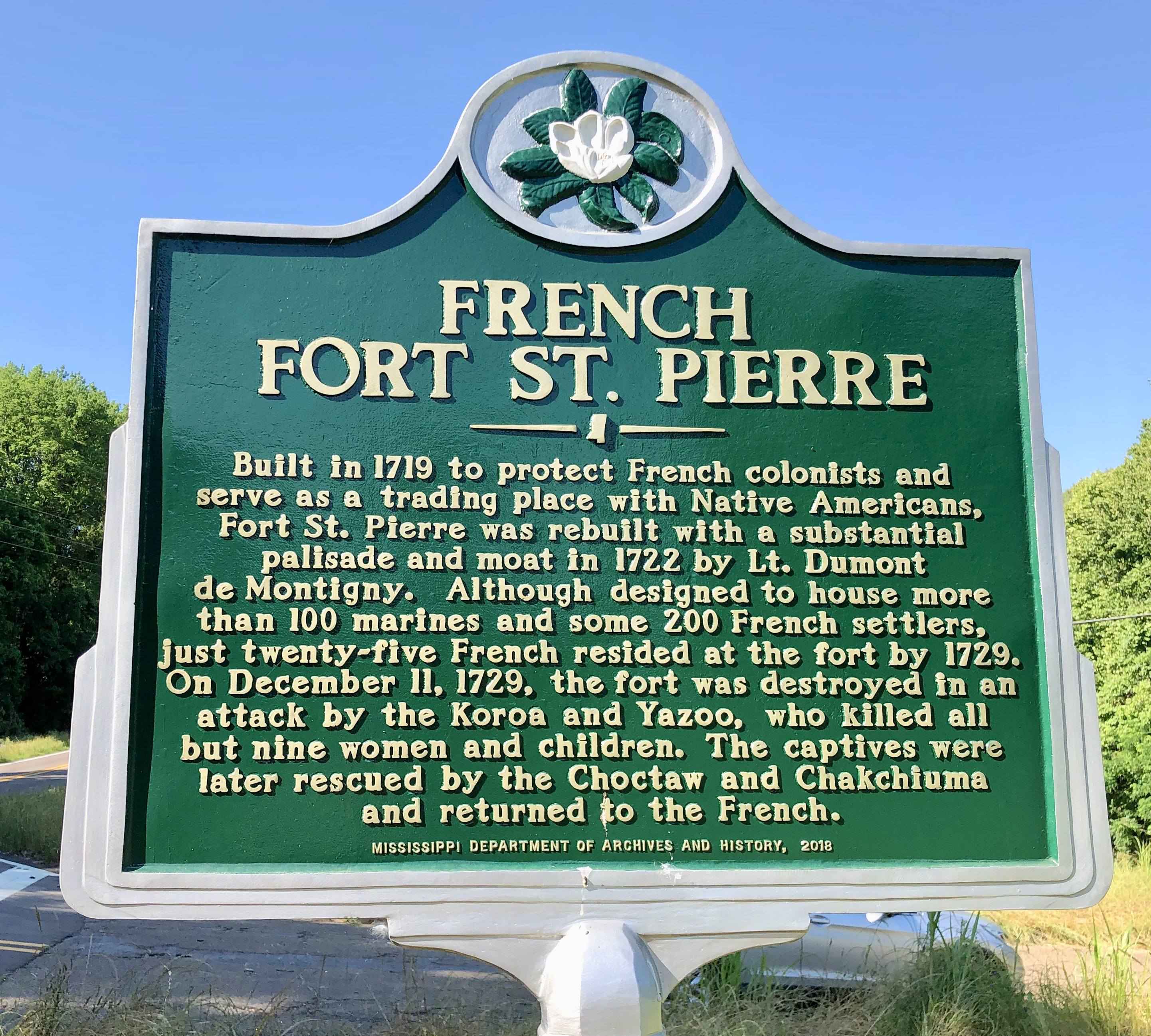

== History ==
French Louisiana was established in 1699, with New Orleans founded as a major center in 1718. French explorers of the Yazoo River valley first took place between 1698 and 1706, when French missionaries were active in the area. By then, English traders from the Province of Carolina had already established relations with the Chickasaw people of northern Mississippi, and were making inroads with the Natchez people further south. The missionary activity ceased when one of them was murdered by the Natchez. An expansion of French Louisiana was thwarted by France's inability to support the colony during the War of the Spanish Succession (aka Queen Anne's War in English North America, 1702–1713). The French established Fort St. Pierre in 1719 as a northern outpost between these peoples, as a means to blunt English trading influence and further their own. The fort was a substantial palisaded complex, surrounded by a moat. It was destroyed in a surprise attack on December 11, 1729, by a band of Natchez, whose leadership had become hostile to French incursions on their territory upon the death of a French-friendly chief.

The Yazoo Bluffs area, where the fort was located, did not come to significant archaeological attention until the 1970s. James Ford believed that its site would yield useful information for dating other historical Native sites in the region, but did not find the fort. In 1974 a formal survey of the lower Mississippi identified the site, which underwent a major excavation between 1975 and 1977. These excavations exposed portions of the palisade, one of the fort's bastions, and other features. Unique among known colonial sites, archaeologists also uncovered evidence that the occupants used a wooden shot tower to manufacture lead shot. The comparatively short occupation period of Fort St. Pierre has also allowed more sophisticated distinction among finds at sites such as that of Fort Toulouse, which had a much longer occupation period.

== Indigenous Groups at Fort St. Pierre and Pottery ==
The land around Fort St. Pierre in Vicksburg Mississippi was home to three different native groups, Yazoo, Koroa, Ofogoula, before the French arrived. These groups were friendly with the English and Chickasaw Native tribe, which was contradictory to French interests. Two of these groups, the Yazoo and Koroa were influential in the collapse of Fort St. Pierre. In December 1729, they attacked the fort and killed most of the inhabitants. The third tribe native to this regions, the Ofogoula was not present for the attack. They had relocated to the Natchez region. After the fall of the fort, the Yazoo and Koroa left but continued hostilities towards the French and any indigenous tribe that happened to be fighting with them. Given that these indigenous groups were active on the landscape before and during the French occupation of Fort St. Pierre there is much archaeological evidence pertaining to the Yazoo, Koroa, and Ofogoula. Large amounts of native pottery were found by archaeologists at the site. At Fort St. Pierre, 43% of their archaeological collection is composed of Native ceramic fragments. Those frequently used artifacts, like pottery, tell us what was important to indigenous people of the past and how they lived their lives. Pots and bowls are essentials for cooking, preparing, serving, and storing food. Native women were the primary producers of these clay vessels.

== Food and Supplies ==
Fort Saint Pierre as a French fort received resupply and reinforcement through land. Uses of Naval support or vessels along the Yazoo River were scarce if ever utilized. Primary food and water resources were acquired via the land surrounding the fort. The soldiers stationed would farm the land and their own food and would seek water through the Yazoo. Outsourced supply or trade was then primarily if not always carried out by land. Life at the fort was relatively simple yet boring, which left little to do save keep watch, farm, and tend the land.

== Soldiers at the Fort ==
Not many records of the soldiers’ daily lives have been found. But from what we know and from a couple of journal entries we can conclude a few things soldiers experienced during their time at the fort. It is said that the soldiers would go to the chapel to pray twice a day as a part of their duty. The soldiers were given their own plot of land to plant whatever they pleased which is one way they spent their free time. Other forms of leisure activities would include drawing, writing, reading, or spending time with their comrades. We are informed that daily life at the fort was peaceful and usually happy, but with that comes pure boredom. The soldiers’ time was frequently filled with duties such as military drills and maneuvers which kept them on their toes. One problem the soldiers dealt with was a shortage of food and a drought during one summer. They were able to engage in trading with the native tribes around them which in turn helped them out.

== Artifacts from the Archaeological Excavation of the Fort St. Pierre Site in Vicksburg, MS ==
Featured here: Glass Beads, Pottery and Ceramics, Swivel Guns, Rosary Beads, Musketballs and Lead Shot, Knives, Nails, Buckles, Jetons

=== Trade: Glass Beads ===
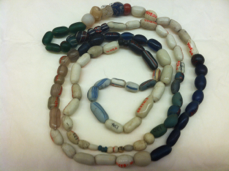

Drawn beads, also known as cane beads, seed beads, or tube beads, first came to be made in ancient Rome and the technique was then employed in India, Italy, France, and Northwestern Europe. Glass beads were then shipped to North America as a trade item. The specific bead types found at Fort St. Pierre are most likely directly from Venice, Italy. The Venetians were very skilled craftsmen, and they used the same bead making process to create drawn beads as the Romans. The Venetians brought their designs to the Netherlands. Beads were also produced in Paris and London. In addition, beads were traded and shipped to France, which were passed on to explorers, who brought them to the Americas in the early 16th century. When European explorers brought the beads with them, the natives living in the Americas quickly incorporated items like these drawn beads into their own trade and decoration practices. This is how the beads made their way to the fort in Mississippi.

=== Pottery and Ceramics ===
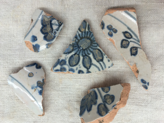

There are several pottery and ceramic fragments on the site of Fort St. Pierre, many of them being pieces of French Faience. Faience is a form of tin-glazed earthenware that was inspired by imported Chinese porcelain. At the time Faience was considered fairly valuable, but many of the pieces of faience found at Fort St. Pierre are considered to be rejects and misproductions that were sold cheaply to colonists and settlers. Much of the earthenware has been shattered into pieces, possibly due to the destruction of the fort in 1729. Most of the faience in the fort was used for daily life, being used for drinking cups and plates.

=== Swivel Guns ===

Swivel guns are smaller naval cannons which can are placed upon a rotating swivel to fire. The presence of swivel guns at Fort Saint Pierre is likely but unknown. The only artifacts unearthed were ammunition which was too large for rifles of the time, and too small for cannons. There is a possibility of the use of wall guns, but this can be discounted as there were no remnants of wall guns at the site. While wall guns stood upon long wooden mounts or rest upon a wall to fire, a swivel gun often utilized two operators and was situated on a rotating swivel. The other artifact discovered is an iron casting which also resembles the time period's iron lanterns. However both of these artifacts were discovered along the river side of the fort and were in relative close distance. Proving further that swivel guns may have been present. While many items are taken into account for determining the use of swivel guns, it is likely that they were present and either removed by a raiding enemy or removed by French forces prior to the fort's demise.

=== Rosary Beads ===
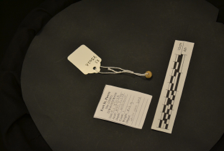

It is possible that some of the beads recovered from the remains of the Fort could have been part of a rosary, though they are most likely glass beads intended as items of trade. An archaeological signal of glass rosary beads is when they are recovered linked together by metal loops. Rosary artifacts such as these are recovered at various colonial sites, leading again to the question of where are the rosaries at Fort St. Pierre? If they existed, these items were likely looted, as the looting of religious items from the Jesuit priest at the fort was recorded by French witnesses. Later, Catholic officials paid ransoms to several Native groups to regain the church items, but rosaries were not listed among the returned items.

=== Musketballs and Lead Shot ===
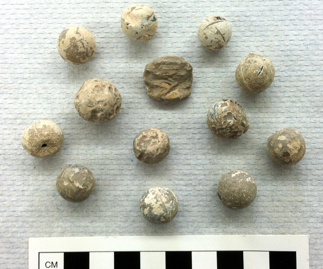

Musketballs were recovered at Fort St. Pierre inside structures, palisades, trenches, and the moat. These spherical projectiles made of iron or lead were used both as trade items and as weapons in combat. Musketballs are typically the most common items found at frontier sites, though only a small quantity was found at Fort St. Pierre. The most logical explanation as to their absence is looting after the 1729 attack. Shot sizes ranged from smaller bird and buck shot used for hunting birds and game to large musketballs used for trading and warfare. Extra room had to be left between the musketball and the inside of the gun barrel to allow for fouling, or the build-up of black powder after each shot. The presence of a lead shot drop area indicates French soldiers at Fort St. Pierre made their own small shot. They may have made musketballs, too, since musketballs and firearms were so valuable to life in the colonies. In general, lead shot and powder were never scarcities for French colonists. Import of these goods to Louisiane increased from 1.25 tons of lead balls in 1704 to 10 tons in 1733. Archaeologists suggest shot shipped to the colonies was not sorted according to size. Soldiers therefore had to estimate which size shot would work in their barrels, and they sometimes used knives or their own teeth to correct ill-fitting balls.

=== Knives ===
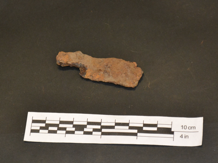

Knives, although very basic tools, were essential to the survival of the French Colonists in the New World. This was because knives played a large role in their daily lives, aiding them with hunting, cooking, and trade. Knives were most valuable to the French Colonists when used as trading materials. When first arriving in the new world it was important that the French created a good relationship with the natives of that area. If they did not, it was likely that they would not survive. Pierre Le Moyne d’Iberville, a French explorer and founder of the colony La Louisiane, understood the importance of maintaining good relations with Indians. As soon as he reached American shores, he attempted to make preliminary contact with the indigenous population in order to facilitate land reconnaissance. When he first made contact, he left the natives with two axes, four knives, and some vermilion to show his good intentions toward two Indians who had been observing them since their arrival. This was the start of a gift system that resulted in the natives becoming dependent on Europeans. Since the natives could not reproduce these knives because they did not know how to create iron and steel tools, they had to be replaced. This opened up trade between the French and the natives. Knives were among the most popular and widespread items of trade in North America. The first known European artifact given to an Indian in Louisiana was a knife presented to a chief of the Natchez by Henri Tonti on March 26, 1682. Clasp knives and case knives were the most common knives in the trade network. These were common because their simple design made them easy to mass-produce. Case knives were often boxed up into cases and shipped over to North America. This allowed the French to trade many knives all at once.

=== Nails ===
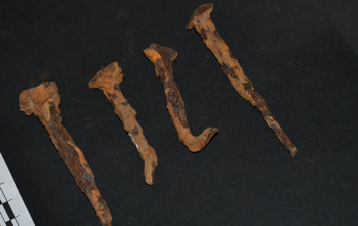

One of the most common artifacts found in the French colonial site of Fort St. Pierre are hand wrought nails. Different types of nails were found at this site with the most common being the Rose Head nail, the “L” Head, “T” Head, as well as tacks. Hand-wrought nails have different uses and are applied in different scenarios for distinctive materials. For example, the Rose Head was more commonly used for practical uses while the “L” Head nail was used for furniture. By studying these artifacts, we can better understand the different uses for nails in this French Colonial space.

=== Buckles ===
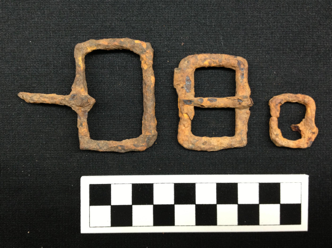

Buckles are a common find at Fort St. Pierre and forts alike. Soldiers at the fort used these buckles for many different uses. These include keeping articles of clothing sturdy, tightening straps and harnesses (on both weapons and their rucksacks), and they were used as fashionable accessories on their uniforms. Because of the many uses, buckles during Fort St. Pierre's lifetime ranged greatly in shapes and sizes. Some were larger and more extravagant while others were less flashy and were used more predominantly for their use rather than accessories. Since the fort is a soldier base most of the buckles are plain with minimum designs engraved on them because their usefulness was more valued than their beauty.

=== Muskets ===
The 1716 and 1729-1734 model marine muskets were common among the French marines and were likely carried by the men of Fort St. Pierre. While the soldiers were likely the only ones who carried firearms in the fort, similar weaponry was in common use in colonial North America in the 18th century. For example, a smoothbore, flintlock musket hunting gun, called the Fusil de chasse was produced in Tulle, France. Local militiamen and Native groups used these muskets, as they were lightweight and well built. When excavation took place, it was expected that there would be a lot of rifles in the fort, however in comparison to most other forts there were few muskets to be found. It is possible that the cause for the lack of muskets to be found is due to the fort being looted and the remnants of the muskets could be found in locations surrounding Fort St. Pierre.

=== Jetons ===
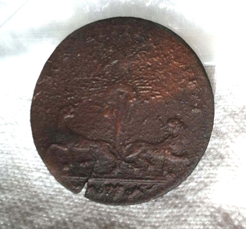

Among the artifacts found in the excavation were jetons, a coin typically made of copper or other less valuable material of the time. These jetons, though heavily deteriorated, were able to give insight into the possible daily lives of the soldiers stationed at the fort while it was controlled by the French. Jetons often had little to no monetary value outside of French colonial holdings; largely used as a gaming piece or for betting—similar to a modern poker chip. Interestingly, this also could have shown that there was possible interaction between soldiers and natives in the area, as it has been documented that the natives also gambled in similar ways to the soldiers—horse races, card games, etc.

== Fort's Destruction ==
Following the fire and destruction of Fort St. Pierre in 1729 at the hand of the native people, the fort was abandoned and never rebuilt; a time lasting over 100 years. However, the land did see use again after it was utilized for a Civil War camp for an 18-month stretch between 1862 and 1863, though it is possible that some of the artifacts found during the excavation of the site were from this period.

According to Ian W. Brown and Bill Wright, some of the artifacts from the site likely originate from the 1862-1863 period. Among these artifacts are a light turquoise glass container, multiple pieces of leather likely a part of the heel of a shoe, a brass button with an eagle, and a brass gun thumb plate stamped with die.

== See also ==
- List of National Historic Landmarks in Mississippi
- National Register of Historic Places listings in Warren County, Mississippi
