= Magnolia (disambiguation) =

Magnolia is a genus of flowering plants.

Magnolia or The Magnolia may also refer to:

== Places ==
=== Australia ===
- Magnolia, Queensland, a locality in the Fraser Coast Region, Queensland, Australia

=== United States ===
- Magnolia, Alabama, an unincorporated community
- Magnolia, Arkansas, a city
- Magnolia, former name of Inyokern, California
- Magnolia, Delaware, a town
- Magnolia, Florida, a former town
- Magnolia, Georgia, an unincorporated community
- Magnolia, Illinois, a village
- Magnolia, Indiana, an unincorporated community
- Magnolia, Iowa, a city in Harrison County
- Magnolia, Livingston Parish, Louisiana, an unincorporated community
- Magnolia, Massachusetts, a village in the city of Gloucester
- Magnolia, Minnesota, a town in Rock County
- Magnolia, Mississippi, a city
- Magnolia, Missouri, an unincorporated community
- Magnolia, New Jersey, a borough
- Magnolia, North Carolina, a town
- Magnolia, Ohio, a village
- Magnolia, Texas, a city in Montgomery County
- Magnolia, Seattle, Washington, a neighborhood
  - Magnolia Bridge, a bridge connecting the Seattle, Washington neighborhoods of Magnolia and Interbay
- Magnolia, West Virginia, an unincorporated community
- Magnolia, Wisconsin, a town
  - Magnolia (community), Wisconsin, an unincorporated community in the town
- Magnolia Township (disambiguation)

=== Space ===
- 1060 Magnolia, asteroid

== Houses and plantations in the United States ==
- Magnolia Plantation (disambiguation)
- Magnolia (Bennettsville, South Carolina), a private residence
- Magnolia (Gadsden, South Carolina), a plantation house
- Canty House, also known as "The Magnolia", a historic house on the campus of West Virginia State University
- The Magnolia, a historic house in Los Angeles, California

== People ==
- Anne Hartkamp (born 1964), German jazz singer who has often gone under the pseudonym of "Magnolia"
- Magnolia Antonino (1915–2010), a Senator of the Philippines
- Magnolia Crawford, American drag queen
- Magnolia Howell (born 1983), sprinter for Trinidad and Tobago
- Magnolia Thunderpussy (1939–1996), born Patricia Donna Mallon, San Francisco burlesque performer, radio personality, filmmaker and restaurateur

== Arts and entertainment ==
=== Music ===
==== Albums ====
- Magnolia (The Pineapple Thief album) or the title song, 2014
- Magnolia (Randy Houser album), 2019
- Magnolia (Turnover album), 2013
- Magnolia (score), from the 1999 film, composed by Jon Brion, 2000
- Magnolia (soundtrack), from the 1999 film, by Aimee Mann and others, 1999
- Magnolia (EP), by Ellie Holcomb, or the title song, 2011
- Magnólia, by Lúcia Moniz, 1999

==== Songs ====
- "Magnolia", by J. J. Cale from Naturally, 1972
- "Magnolia" (Gang of Youths song), 2015
- "Magnolia", by Hoobastank from Fight or Flight, 2012
- "Magnolia", by Lil Wayne from In Tune We Trust, 2017
- "Magnolia" (Playboi Carti song), 2017
- "Magnolia", by Soft Play from Acts of Fear and Love, 2018
- "Magnolia", by Big Red Machine from How Long Do You Think It's Gonna Last?, 2021
- "Magnolia", by $uicideboy$ featuring KirbLaGoop from Gray/Grey, 2015
- "Magnolia Street", a song by Kevin Coyne from his 1982 album Politicz
- "Magnolia", a song by Laufey, 2021
- "Magnolias", by Rosalía from Lux, 2025

=== Other arts and entertainment ===
- Magnolia (film), a 1999 film by Paul Thomas Anderson
  - Magnolia (soundtrack)
- Magnolia Pictures, an American film distributor
- Magnolia Network, formerly the DIY Network and now focusing on documentary-style reality series related to home repair and renovation
- Magnolia Breeland, a fictional character on the TV series Hart of Dixie
- Professor Magnolia, a fictional character from the video game Pokémon Sword and Shield

== Brands and enterprises ==
- Magnolia (SMC brand), a food and beverage brand of Philippine company San Miguel Corporation since 1925
  - Magnolia (Philippine company), a wholly owned subsidiary of SMC since 1981 then renamed after the brand
- Magnolia (Fraser and Neave brand), a dairy brand of Singapore company Fraser and Neave since 1937
- Magnolia (oil platform) in the Gulf of Mexico
- Magnolia Bakery, chain of bakeries founded in New York City
- Magnolia Home Theater (brand), the home theater electronics section owned and operated by Best Buy
- Magnolia Hotel (disambiguation)
- Magnolia Petroleum Company, an oil company later a part of Mobil

== Computing and technology ==
- Magnolia (CMS), an open source, Java-based, digital business platform with a content management system (CMS) at its core
- Ma.gnolia, social bookmarking website

== Flora and fauna ==
- Magnolia, cultivar of muscadine
- Magnolia grandiflora (Brooklyn), a tree that has been designated a New York City landmark
- Magnolia warbler, a bird species
- Schisandra chinensis, a plant whose fruit is called magnolia berry

== Ships ==
- Magnolia (steamboat), wooden-hulled steamship that operated on Puget Sound from 1907 to 1937
- USS Augusta (1853), a US Navy ship later renamed Magnolia

== Other uses ==
- Magnolia High School (disambiguation)
- Magnolia Projects, officially the C.J. Peete Projects, also known as "The Magnolia", previous Housing Project in New Orleans
- Magnolia (color), an off-white color
- Magnolia (given name)
- Magnolia Boulevard, a street in Los Angeles and Burbank, California

== See also ==
- Magnolia Cemetery (disambiguation), a number of cemeteries
- Magnolia Grove (disambiguation)
- Magnolia Hall (disambiguation), a number of locations
- Magnolia Manor (disambiguation), a number of listed buildings
- Magnolia Park (disambiguation)
- The Magnolias (disambiguation)
