= Magnolia Plantation =

Magnolia Plantation may refer to:

in the United States

(by state)

- Magnolia Plantation, Florida
- Magnolia Mound, St. Bernard, Louisiana, listed on the National Register of Historic Places (NRHP) in St. Bernard Parish
- Magnolia Mound Plantation House, Baton Rouge, Louisiana, NRHP-listed
- Magnolia Mound Plantation Dependency, Baton Rouge, Louisiana, NRHP-listed in East Baton Rouge Parish
- Magnolia Plantation (Derry, Louisiana), part of Cane River Creole National Historical Park, National Historic Landmark and NRHP-listed
- Magnolia Plantation (Plaquemines Parish, Louisiana), the home of Gen. Pierre "G.T." Beauregard and his first wife
- Magnolia Plantation (Schriever, Louisiana), NRHP-listed
- Magnolia Lane Plantation, Westwego, Louisiana, listed on the National Register of Historic Places (NRHP).
- Magnolia Plantation (Knoxville, Maryland), NRHP-listed
- Magnolia Plantation, Mississippi
- Magnolia Plantation and Gardens (Charleston, South Carolina), NRHP-listed

== See also ==
- Magnolia (disambiguation)
- The Magnolias (disambiguation)
- Magnolia Hall (disambiguation)
- Magnolia Hill (disambiguation)
- Magnolia Manor (disambiguation)
