= Magnolia Manor =

Magnolia Manor may refer to:

- Magnolia Manor (Arkadelphia, Arkansas), listed on the NRHP in Clark County, Arkansas
- Magnolia Manor (Cairo, Illinois), NRHP-listed
- Magnolia Manor (Osyka, Mississippi), listed on the NRHP in Pike County, Mississippi

== See also ==
- Magnolia Hall (disambiguation)
- Magnolia Grove (disambiguation)
- Magnolia Hill (disambiguation)
