= Carr Junior High School =

Carr Junior High School may refer to:

- Carr Junior High School in Vicksburg, Mississippi, part of the South Cherry Street Historic District (Vicksburg, Mississippi) and succeeded Carr Central High School
- Julian S. Carr Junior High School in Durham, North Carolina, part of the Durham High School (North Carolina) campus
