= National Register of Historic Places listings in Warren County, Mississippi =

Location of Warren County in Mississippi

This is a list of the National Register of Historic Places listings in Warren County, Mississippi.

This is intended to be a complete list of the properties and districts on the National Register of Historic Places in the city of Vicksburg and elsewhere in Warren County, Mississippi, United States. Latitude and longitude coordinates are provided for many National Register properties and districts; these locations may be seen together in a map.

There are 78 properties and districts listed on the National Register in the county, including 3 National Historic Landmarks. Another 2 properties were once listed but have been removed.

This National Park Service list is complete through NPS recent listings posted October 30, 2026.

== Current listings ==
	Name on the Register	Image	Date listed	Location	City or town	Description
1	1300 Grove Street House	1300 Grove Street House	November 29, 1983 (#83003976)	1300 Grove St. 32°21′03″N 90°52′28″W	Vicksburg	Also known as the Martha Vick House.
2	Anchuca	Anchuca	March 22, 1982 (#82003113)	1010 1st E. St. 32°21′16″N 90°52′38″W	Vicksburg	
3	Anshe Chesed Cemetery	Anshe Chesed Cemetery	September 10, 2014 (#14000569)	Grove St. 32°20′43″N 90°51′14″W	Vicksburg	
4	Balfour House	Balfour House	October 26, 1971 (#71000458)	1002 Crawford St. 32°20′51″N 90°52′43″W	Vicksburg	
5	Battery #4 Powder Magazine		April 24, 2023 (#100007427)	600 Fort Hill Dr. 32°21′32″N 90°52′39″W	Vicksburg	
6	Beck House	Beck House	March 29, 1979 (#79001336)	1101 South St. 32°20′52″N 90°52′38″W	Vicksburg	
7	Belle Fleur	Belle Fleur	May 7, 1992 (#92000469)	1123 South St. 32°20′52″N 90°53′17″W	Vicksburg	
8	Bethel African Methodist Episcopal Church	Bethel African Methodist Episcopal Church	July 30, 1992 (#92000858)	805 Monroe St. 32°21′16″N 90°52′43″W	Vicksburg	
9	Beulah Cemetery	Beulah Cemetery	October 23, 1992 (#92001404)	Junction of Openwood St. and Old Jackson Rd. 32°21′26″N 90°50′59″W	Vicksburg	
10	Biedenharn Candy Company Building	Biedenharn Candy Company Building	December 2, 1977 (#77000793)	1107-1109 Washington St. 32°21′05″N 90°52′53″W	Vicksburg	
11	Big Black River Battlefield	Big Black River Battlefield	November 23, 1971 (#71000451)	On both banks of the Big Black River between Smith's Station and Bovina; 32°21′36″N 90°43′35″W	Bovina vicinity	Extends into Hinds County
12	Big Black River Railroad Bridge	Big Black River Railroad Bridge	November 16, 1988 (#88002418)	Spans the Big Black River east of Bovina; 32°20′49″N 90°42′17″W	Bovina vicinity	Extends into Hinds County
13	Blum House	Blum House	July 30, 1992 (#92000859)	1420 Cherry St. 32°20′52″N 90°52′44″W	Vicksburg	
14	Bobb House	Bobb House	January 8, 1979 (#79001337)	1503 Harrison St. 32°20′45″N 90°52′21″W	Vicksburg	
15	Isaac Bonham House	Isaac Bonham House	May 26, 1977 (#77000794)	601 Klein St. 32°20′29″N 90°53′06″W	Vicksburg	
16	Buena Vista Plantation House		June 22, 2026 (#100013142)	17123 Highway 465; 32°31′25″N 91°00′34″W	Eagle Lake	
17	Carr Junior High School	Carr Junior High School	April 5, 2002 (#00001055)	1805 Cherry St. 32°20′41″N 90°52′43″W	Vicksburg	
18	Cedar Grove	Cedar Grove	July 19, 1976 (#76001107)	2200 Oak St. 32°20′25″N 90°53′08″W	Vicksburg	
19	Chickasaw Bayou Battlefield		April 24, 1973 (#73001028)	North of Vicksburg on U.S. Route 61; 32°24′45″N 90°51′24″W	Vicksburg vicinity	Site of the Battle of Chickasaw Bayou
20	Christian and Brough Building	Christian and Brough Building	June 2, 2014 (#14000278)	923 Washington St. 32°21′12″N 90°52′53″W	Vicksburg	
21	Church of the Holy Trinity	Church of the Holy Trinity	May 22, 1978 (#78001633)	South and Monroe Sts. 32°20′50″N 90°52′47″W	Vicksburg	
22	Confederate Avenue Brick Arch Bridge	Confederate Avenue Brick Arch Bridge	November 16, 1988 (#88002421)	Confederate Ave. 32°19′45″N 90°52′35″W	Vicksburg	
23	Craig–Flowers House	Craig–Flowers House	August 2, 1984 (#84002352)	2011 Cherry St. 32°20′29″N 90°52′43″W	Vicksburg	
24	Davis–Mitchell House	Davis–Mitchell House	June 1, 1982 (#82003114)	901 Crawford St. 32°20′57″N 90°52′46″W	Vicksburg	
25	Fairground Street Bridge	Fairground Street Bridge	November 16, 1988 (#88002420)	Spans the Illinois Central railroad yard on Fairground St. 32°20′16″N 90°53′25″W	Vicksburg	
26	Federal Fortifications Along Bear Creek		August 30, 1974 (#74001066)	Southwest of Youngton; 32°25′40″N 90°38′06″W	Youngton vicinity	
27	Feld House	Feld House	August 2, 1982 (#82003115)	2108 Cherry St. 32°20′26″N 90°52′46″W	Vicksburg	
28	Fitz–Hugh Hall	Fitz–Hugh Hall	November 6, 1986 (#86003030)	1322 Chambers St. 32°20′18″N 90°52′41″W	Vicksburg	
29	Col. Charles C. Flowerree House	Col. Charles C. Flowerree House	May 29, 1975 (#75001058)	2309 Pearl St. 32°20′25″N 90°53′14″W	Vicksburg	
30	Fonsylvania		September 7, 1984 (#84002355)	Fisher Ferry Rd., south of Vicksburg; 32°11′33″N 90°49′14″W	Vicksburg vicinity	
31	Fort St. Pierre Site	Fort St. Pierre Site	February 16, 2000 (#00000263)	Off U.S. Route 61 north of Vicksburg; 32°29′44″N 90°47′55″W	Vicksburg vicinity	
32	The Galleries		April 17, 1980 (#80002303)	2421 Marshall St. 32°20′14″N 90°53′04″W	Vicksburg	
33	Gilland-Hudson House		January 10, 2024 (#100009721)	1810 Cherry Street; 32°20′41″N 90°52′46″W	Vicksburg	
34	Glenwood–Vicklan Historic District	Glenwood–Vicklan Historic District	November 3, 2009 (#09000886)	Including Vicklan St., Glenwood Cir., Edna Dr., and Chambers St. east of the bayou 32°20′20″N 90°52′14″W	Vicksburg	
35	Duff Green House	Duff Green House	January 11, 1979 (#79001338)	806 Locust St. 32°21′15″N 90°52′32″W	Vicksburg	
36	Grove Street Houses	Grove Street Houses	May 8, 1980 (#80002304)	1117 and 1121 Grove St. 32°21′06″N 90°52′34″W	Vicksburg	
37	Grove Street–Jackson Historic District	Grove Street–Jackson Historic District	November 21, 2007 (#05001613)	Along Grove and Jackson Sts. between Cherry St. and 1st N. St. 32°21′07″N 90°52′33″W	Vicksburg	
38	Guider House	Guider House	May 8, 1980 (#80002305)	1115 Grove St. 32°21′05″N 90°52′35″W	Vicksburg	
39	P.M. Harding House	P.M. Harding House	July 17, 1986 (#86001674)	1402 Chambers St. 32°20′18″N 90°52′35″W	Vicksburg	
40	Hotel Vicksburg	Hotel Vicksburg	June 4, 1979 (#79001339)	801 Clay St. 32°21′00″N 90°52′50″W	Vicksburg	
41	Joel and Margaret Hullum House		July 5, 1984 (#84002358)	749 Mallet Rd. 32°12′47″N 90°52′27″W	Vicksburg vicinity	
42	Hyland Mound Archeological Site	Hyland Mound Archeological Site	August 30, 2001 (#01000920)	Address restricted	Vicksburg	
43	Jackson Street Missionary Baptist Church	Jackson Street Missionary Baptist Church	January 11, 2017 (#100000538)	1416 Jackson St. 32°21′07″N 90°52′20″W	Vicksburg	
44	Fannie Willis Johnson House	Fannie Willis Johnson House	April 8, 1988 (#88000241)	2430 Drummond St. 32°20′09″N 90°52′54″W	Vicksburg	
45	Dr. Isaac Cecil Knox House	Dr. Isaac Cecil Knox House	September 18, 1990 (#90001478)	2823 Confederate Ave. 32°19′14″N 90°53′02″W	Vicksburg	
46	John Lane House	John Lane House	May 6, 1982 (#82003116)	905 Crawford St. 32°20′56″N 90°52′45″W	Vicksburg	
47	W.W. Lassiter Wholesale Grocery Warehouse		March 7, 1994 (#94000149)	1308 Levee St. 32°21′01″N 90°53′03″W	Vicksburg	
48	Loosa Yokena Archeological Site	Loosa Yokena Archeological Site	May 8, 2001 (#01000481)	Address restricted	Kimberly	
49	Luckett Compound	Luckett Compound	July 28, 1983 (#83000968)	1116-1122 Crawford St; 32°20′53″N 90°52′36″W	Vicksburg	
50	The Magnolias	The Magnolias	February 26, 1987 (#87000217)	1617 Monroe St. 32°20′45″N 90°52′49″W	Vicksburg	
51	Magruder–Morrissey House	Magruder–Morrissey House	May 24, 1984 (#84002361)	1117 Cherry St. 32°21′03″N 90°52′41″W	Vicksburg	
52	Main Street Historic District	Main Street Historic District	April 16, 1979 (#79001340)	1st East, Adams, Main, and Openwoods Sts.; also roughly bounded by Adams St., Main St., Cherry St., and 1st East St. 32°21′12″N 90°52′32″W	Vicksburg	Second set of boundaries represents a boundary increase of January 5, 1989
53	McDermott House		July 12, 1984 (#84002359)	1100 South St. 32°20′50″N 90°52′40″W	Vicksburg	
54	McNutt House	McNutt House	May 29, 1975 (#75001059)	Northwestern corner of Monroe and E. 1st Sts. 32°21′17″N 90°52′45″W	Vicksburg	
55	Mississippi River Bridge	Mississippi River Bridge	February 14, 1989 (#88002423)	Spans the Mississippi River on Old U.S. Route 80; 32°18′54″N 90°54′20″W	Vicksburg	Extends into Madison Parish, Louisiana
56	Old Courthouse, Warren County	Old Courthouse, Warren County	May 23, 1968 (#68000029)	Court Sq. 32°21′07″N 90°52′43″W	Vicksburg	
57	Pemberton's Headquarters	Pemberton's Headquarters	July 23, 1970 (#70000319)	1018 Crawford St. 32°20′54″N 90°52′40″W	Vicksburg	also known as Willis–Cowan House
58	Planters Hall	Planters Hall	June 21, 1971 (#71000459)	822 Main St. 32°21′14″N 90°52′46″W	Vicksburg	
59	Polk–Sherard–Hinman House		May 11, 2018 (#100002423)	2615 Confederate Ave. 32°19′37″N 90°52′49″W	Vicksburg	
60	Rolling Acres Historic District		October 8, 2019 (#100004505)	Elizabeth Circle and intersecting streets 32°21′16″N 90°51′10″W	Vicksburg	
61	Adolph Rose Building	Adolph Rose Building	November 12, 1992 (#92001567)	717 Clay St. 32°21′01″N 90°52′53″W	Vicksburg	
62	St. Francis Xavier Convent	St. Francis Xavier Convent	April 18, 1977 (#77000796)	1021 Crawford St. 32°20′55″N 90°52′39″W	Vicksburg	
63	Shlenker House	Shlenker House	November 17, 1983 (#83003975)	2212 Cherry St. 32°20′20″N 90°52′46″W	Vicksburg	
64	Snyder's Bluff	Snyder's Bluff	February 6, 1973 (#73001027)	Along the Yazoo River north of Redwood; 32°29′51″N 90°47′53″W	Redwood vicinity	
65	South Cherry Street Historic District	South Cherry Street Historic District	November 14, 2003 (#03001140)	Along Cherry and Drummond Sts. from Harrison St. to Bowmar St. and including Chambers and Baum Sts. 32°20′25″N 90°52′42″W	Vicksburg	
66	South Drummond Street Neighborhood Historic District		September 28, 2015 (#15000667)	Roughly bounded by Bowmar & Confederate Aves., Yerger, Green, 2nd, Oak Hill & Polk Sts., Halls Ferry Rd. 32°19′52″N 90°53′08″W	Vicksburg	
67	South Vicksburg Public School No. 200	South Vicksburg Public School No. 200	March 20, 1986 (#86000482)	900 Speed St. 32°20′18″N 90°53′06″W	Vicksburg	Demolished with the materials salvaged in 2009.
68	Tri–State Motor Coach Station	Tri–State Motor Coach Station	January 24, 2019 (#100003347)	1511 Walnut St. 32°20′51″N 90°52′53″W	Vicksburg	
69	Uptown Vicksburg Historic District	Uptown Vicksburg Historic District	August 19, 1993 (#93000850)	Roughly bounded by Locust, South, Washington, and Clay Sts.; also mostly on Washington St. between Grove and Veto Sts.; also roughly bounded by Washington, Grove, China, Clay, Locust, South & Veto Sts., 32°20′55″N 90°52′45″W	Vicksburg	Second and third sets of boundaries represents boundary increases approved September 10, 2004 and February 4, 2020.
70	U.S.S. CAIRO	U.S.S. CAIRO	September 3, 1971 (#71000068)	U.S.S. Cairo Museum; 32°22′33″N 90°52′00″W	Vicksburg vicinity	
71	Vicksburg National Military Park	Vicksburg National Military Park	October 15, 1966 (#66000100)	North and east of Vicksburg; 32°20′28″N 90°51′44″W	Vicksburg	
72	Old Vicksburg Public Library	Old Vicksburg Public Library	July 30, 1992 (#92000857)	819 South St. 32°20′53″N 90°52′51″W	Vicksburg	
73	Vicksburg Siege Cave		March 14, 1973 (#73001029)	Near the Vicksburg City Cemetery; 32°21′59″N 90°51′41″W	Vicksburg	
74	Walnut Hills	Walnut Hills	March 19, 1982 (#82003117)	1214 Adams St. 32°20′59″N 90°52′39″W	Vicksburg	
75	Waterways Experiment Station	Waterways Experiment Station	December 13, 2000 (#00001511)	Roughly bounded by Spillway, Durden Creek, Tennessee Rd., and Dam Spillway; 32°17′50″N 90°52′10″W	Vicksburg	
76	Yazoo And Mississippi Valley Depot	Yazoo And Mississippi Valley Depot	November 13, 1979 (#79001341)	500 Grove St. 32°21′09″N 90°52′59″W	Vicksburg	
77	Yokena Presbyterian Church	Yokena Presbyterian Church	September 7, 1984 (#84002442)	South of Vicksburg on U.S. Route 61; 32°10′25″N 90°56′31″W	Vicksburg vicinity	
78	Young–Bradfield House	Young–Bradfield House	May 6, 1982 (#82003118)	913 Crawford St. 32°20′56″N 90°52′44″W	Vicksburg	

== Former listings ==
	Name on the Register	Image	Date listed	Date removed	Location	City or town	Description
1	Confederate Avenue Steel Arch Bridge	Confederate Avenue Steel Arch Bridge	September 5, 1990 (#88002483)	December 17, 2002	Spans Jackson Rd. in Vicksburg National Military Park	Vicksburg	Demolished by the National Park Service in June 2002
2	Sprague	Sprague	April 15, 1977 (#77000795)	May 15, 1987	Vicksburg Harbor	Vicksburg	Severely damaged by fire in 1974. Sank during restoration in 1979. Further damaged beyond repair during salvage in 1981.

== See also ==
- List of National Historic Landmarks in Mississippi
- National Register of Historic Places listings in Mississippi
