= Henriette Amiard Oberteuffer =

American painter

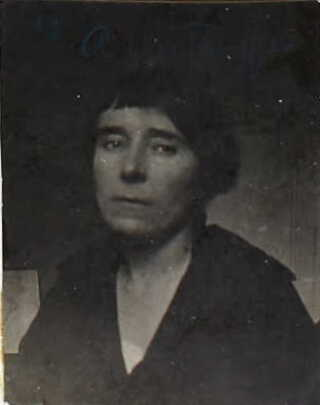
- Born: June 20, 1877; Le Havre
- Died: 1962 (aged 84–85); Lexington
- Occupation: Artist
- Spouse(s): George Oberteuffer
- Children: Karl Oberteuffer

Henriette Amiard Oberteuffer (June 20, 1877 – 1962) was a French-born American painter, muralist, printmaker, and educator.

She was born Henriette Aurélie Eugénie Amiard on June 20, 1877 in Le Havre, France, the daughter of Charles Etienne Amiard and Victorine Alexandrine Daquet. Her father was a coal merchant and amateur artist.

She studied under Jean-Joseph Benjamin-Constant and Jean-Paul Laurens at the Académie Julian in Paris. She exhibited with the Salon d'Automne and the Salon des Indépendants. At the Académie, she met American artist George Oberteuffer. They married in 1905. Their son was the painter Karl Oberteuffer. The Oberteuffers moved to the United States in 1919.

In 1922, they moved to Milwaukee, Wisconsin, where George Oberteuffer worked as an art teacher and both Oberteuffers ran a summer art school in Cedarburg, Wisconsin. They both exhibited regionally and both won the prestigious Logan Prize from the Art Institute of Chicago, George in 1926 for a portrait of Henriette, and Henriette in 1927 for The Yellow Dress. In the 1930s, they both taught art in Memphis, Tennessee, first at the Lee Academy, then the Memphis Academy of Arts.

Henriette Oberteuffer won a competition to create a Works Progress Administration mural in the US Post Office and Courthouse in Vicksburg, Mississippi (now a privately owned building in the Uptown Vicksburg Historic District). The mural, Vicksburg—Its Character and Industries, was installed in 1939.

Henriette Oberteuffer's work is in the collections of the Art Institute of Chicago, the Phillips Collection, and the Minneapolis Institute of Art.

Henriette Amiard Oberteuffer died in Massachusetts in 1962.
