= Balfour House =

Historic house in Mississippi, United States

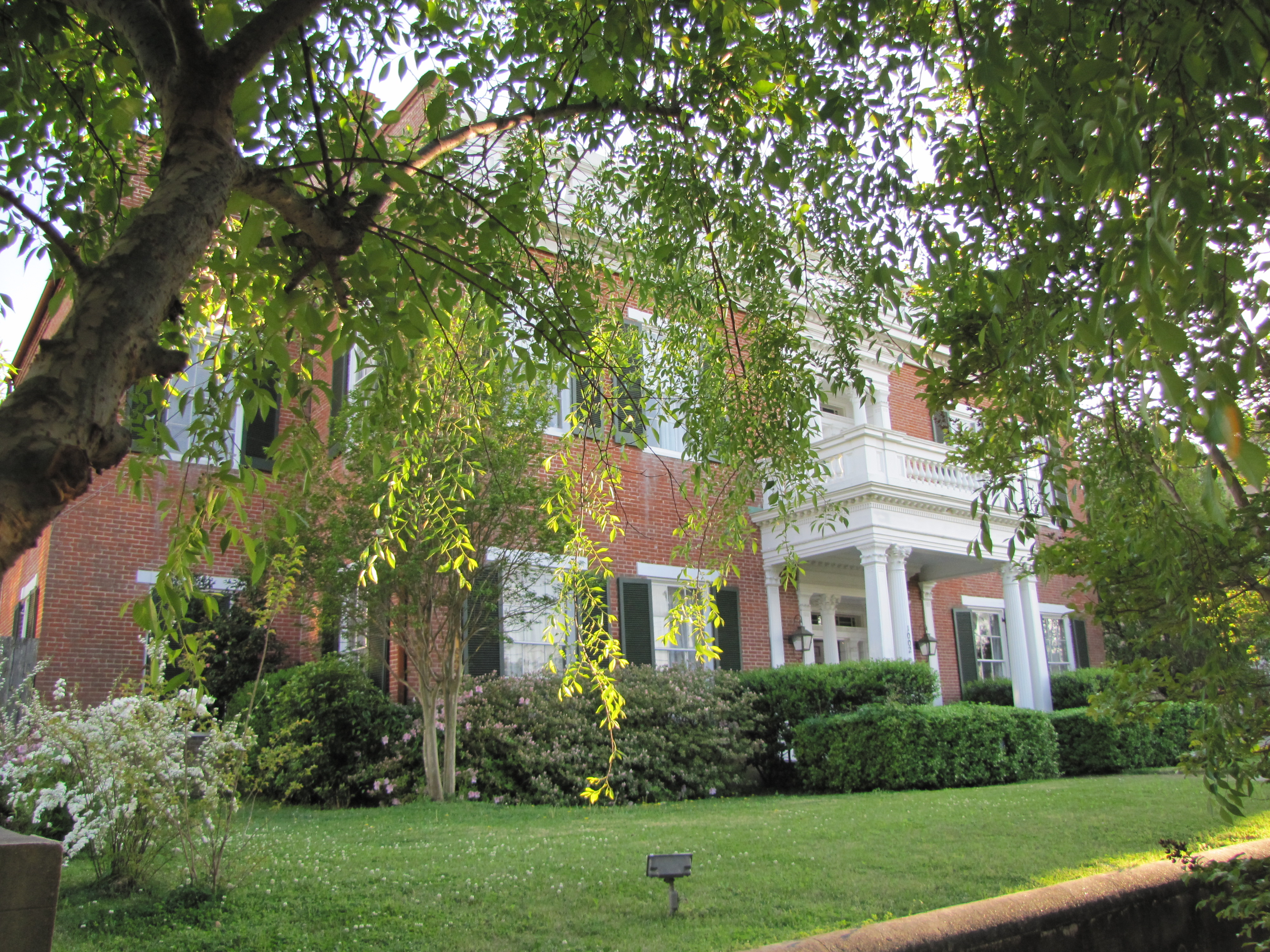
Balfour House

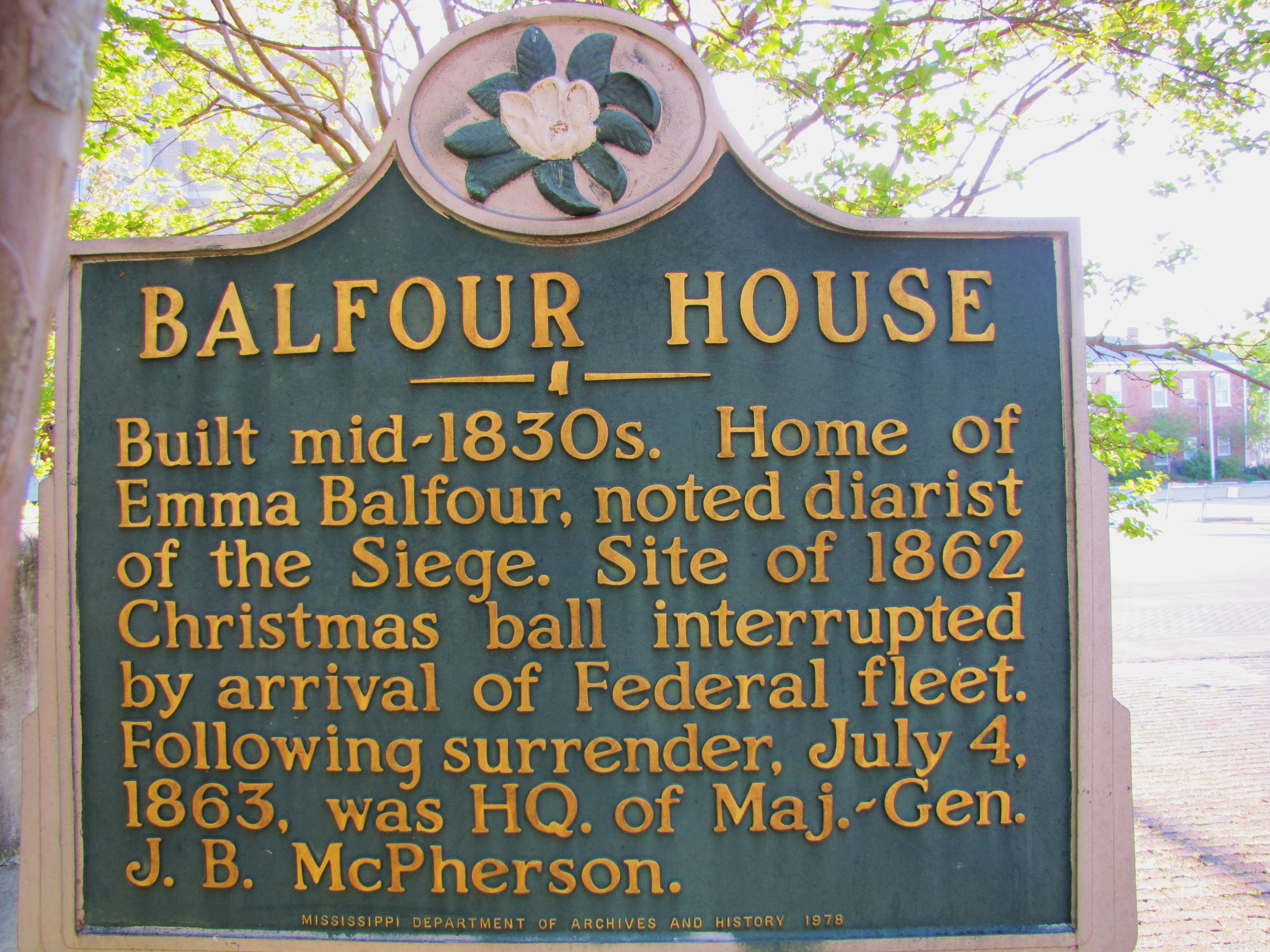
Historic Marker

Balfour House is an antebellum mansion located at the corner of Crawford Street and Cherry Street in Vicksburg, Mississippi. Built in 1835, it was the home of Emma Balfour, (Note: Emma Balfour's husband was Dr. William T. Balfour, and in some sources she is referred to as Mrs. William T. Balfour.) celebrated diarist of the Siege of Vicksburg. The red-brick, two-story structure features elements of Greek Revival and Federalist styles and is listed on the National Register of Historic Places.

== 1862 Christmas ball ==
In a scene reminiscent of the 1815 Duchess of Richmond's Ball prior to the Battle of Waterloo, Balfour House played host to a grand Christmas Ball on the night of December 24, 1862. (Note: "Every Christmas at the historic and beautifully restored Balfour House a holiday ball is held that imitates an affair held by William and Emma Balfour in December 1862" (Winckler 1991).) The guests included many Confederate Army officers and their ladies. Among them was Brig. Gen. Martin Luther Smith, and Lt. Gen. Stephen D. Lee, who decades later published his own recollections of the fateful ball.

As the Christmas Eve revelry progressed, the telegraph office just across the Mississippi River in Louisiana received an urgent message from Major L.L. Daniel at Lake Providence, about 36 miles north. The message was received by Philip H. Fall, a Western Union telegraph operator who had joined the Vicksburg Light Artillery after Lincoln called for 75,000 volunteers to, "collect the duties and imposts," required by the Federal treasury and force the Southern states back into the union.

The Mississippi River was dangerously turbulent that night, and the weather was cold and stormy. The only available transport across to Vicksburg was a small skiff. It would mean risking his life, but Fall felt compelled to deliver the crucial information to General Smith, who he knew would be at the Balfours' Christmas Ball at that moment.

Shortly after midnight, Fall, exhausted and covered in mud, burst through the door of Balfour House and waded into the crowd of dancers, who gave him a wide berth. When he saw General Smith he went directly to him and told him what he'd heard from Lake Providence. Upon hearing the news, Smith announced loudly "This ball is at an end! The enemy is coming down river. All non-combatants must leave the city!" The men had only seconds to bid loved-ones good-bye as they rushed away and reported to station. Later, on December 26, came the Battle of Chickasaw Bayou, the initial battle of the Vicksburg Campaign.

Fall died in 1913 in Houston, Texas; he had worked for Western Union for 55 years. A member of the Sons of Confederate Veterans, Fall is often identified as a Colonel. That was a strictly honorary title granted by the SCV in recognition of his heroic service at Vicksburg. He is buried in Oakwood Cemetery.

== Siege of Vicksburg ==
During the Siege of Vicksburg, most houses were abandoned in favor of caves dug into hillsides for protection against mortar attacks, but Balfour House remained occupied. Emma Balfour famously refused to leave, and in fact used her home to shelter wounded Confederate soldiers.

With Union forces surrounding Vicksburg on all sides, and the Union Navy occupying the Mississippi River, the feeling of entrapment was palpable. Emma wrote: "What is to become of all the living things in this place when the boats commend shelling—God only knows—shut up as in a trap—no ingress or egress—and thousands of women and children...".

== Union headquarters ==
After the surrender of the Confederates, Balfour House served as headquarters of Union Maj. Gen. James B. McPherson.
