= Blum House =

Historic house in Mississippi, U.S.

- U.S. National Register of Historic Places
- U.S. National Historic Landmark District – Contributing property
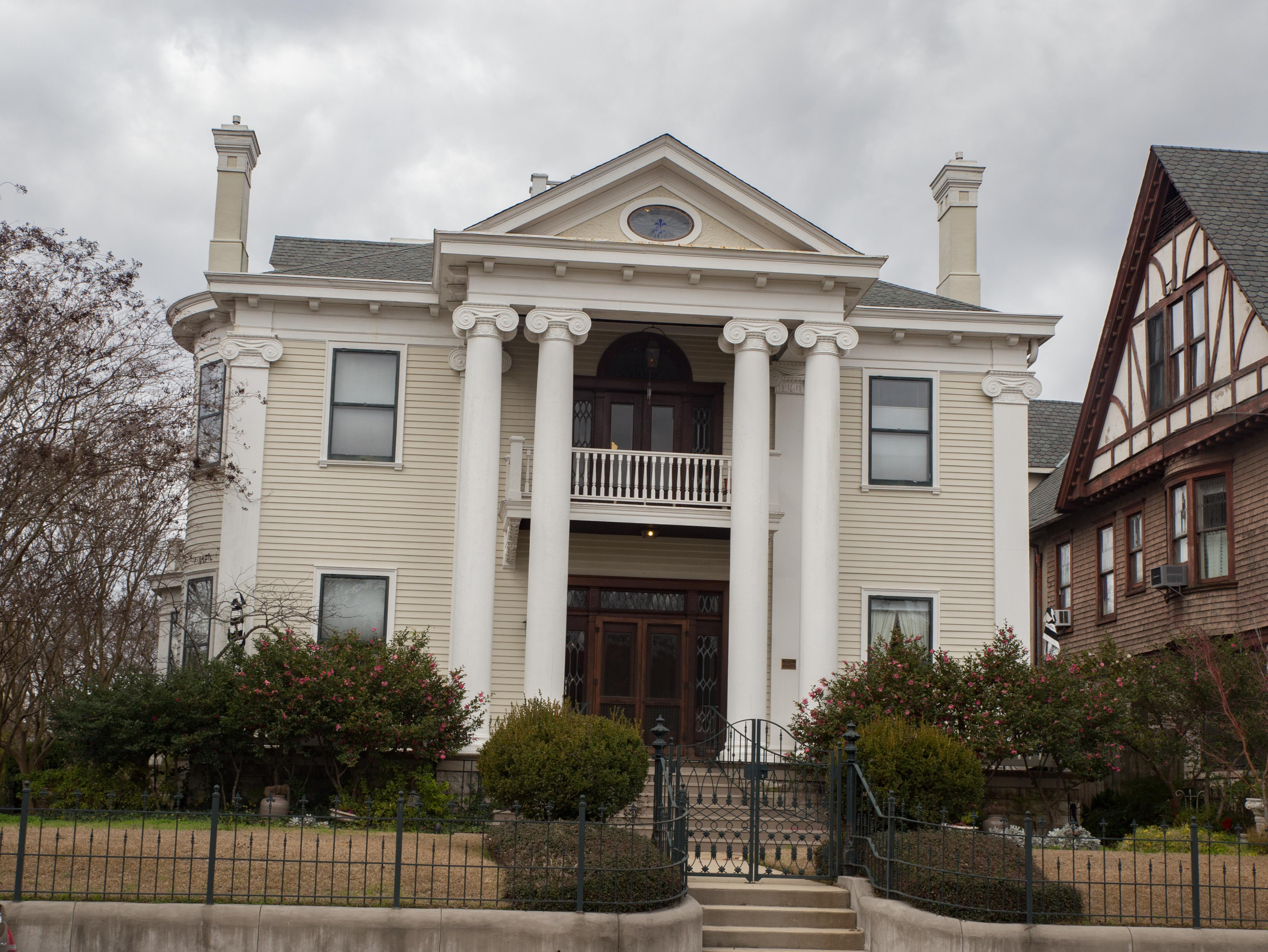
- Blum House in 2019

- Location within Mississippi Location within the United States
- Interactive map showing the location of Blum House
- Location: 1420 Cherry St., Vicksburg, Warren County, Mississippi, United States
- Coordinates: 32.347903°N 90.87888°W
- Built: 1902
- Architect: Theodore C. Link
- Architectural style: Neoclassical Revival
- Part of: Uptown Vicksburg Historic District (ID93000850)
- MPS: Vicksburg MPS
- NRHP reference No.: 92000859
- Added to NRHP: July 30, 1992

Blum House, also known as Levy House, is a historic residence built in 1902 in Vicksburg, Mississippi, United States. It has been listed on the National Register of Historic Places since July 30, 1992; and part of the Uptown Vicksburg Historic District since 1993.

== History ==
The Blum House was built in 1902, for Theresa Bloom Blum (1859–1933), spouse of Solomon Blum (1848–1903), a Jewish merchant from Delhi, Louisiana. It was designed by Theodore C. Link, German-born American architect known for designing the Mississippi State Capitol.

It is as a two-story, clapboard with a slate-covered, truncated hipped roof. The two-story portico has an oval window in the tympanum and is supported by four slender Ionic columns. The Blum House derives its significance for the NRHP listing from the architecture, it being one of the best examples of the Neoclassical Revival style in Vicksburg.

The house is included on the historic marker for Cherry Street, on the Vicksburg Heritage Walking Trail.

== See also ==
- National Register of Historic Places listings in Warren County, Mississippi
- Jews in the Southern United States
