= Belle Fleur =

Historic house in Warren County, Mississippi

- U.S. National Register of Historic Places
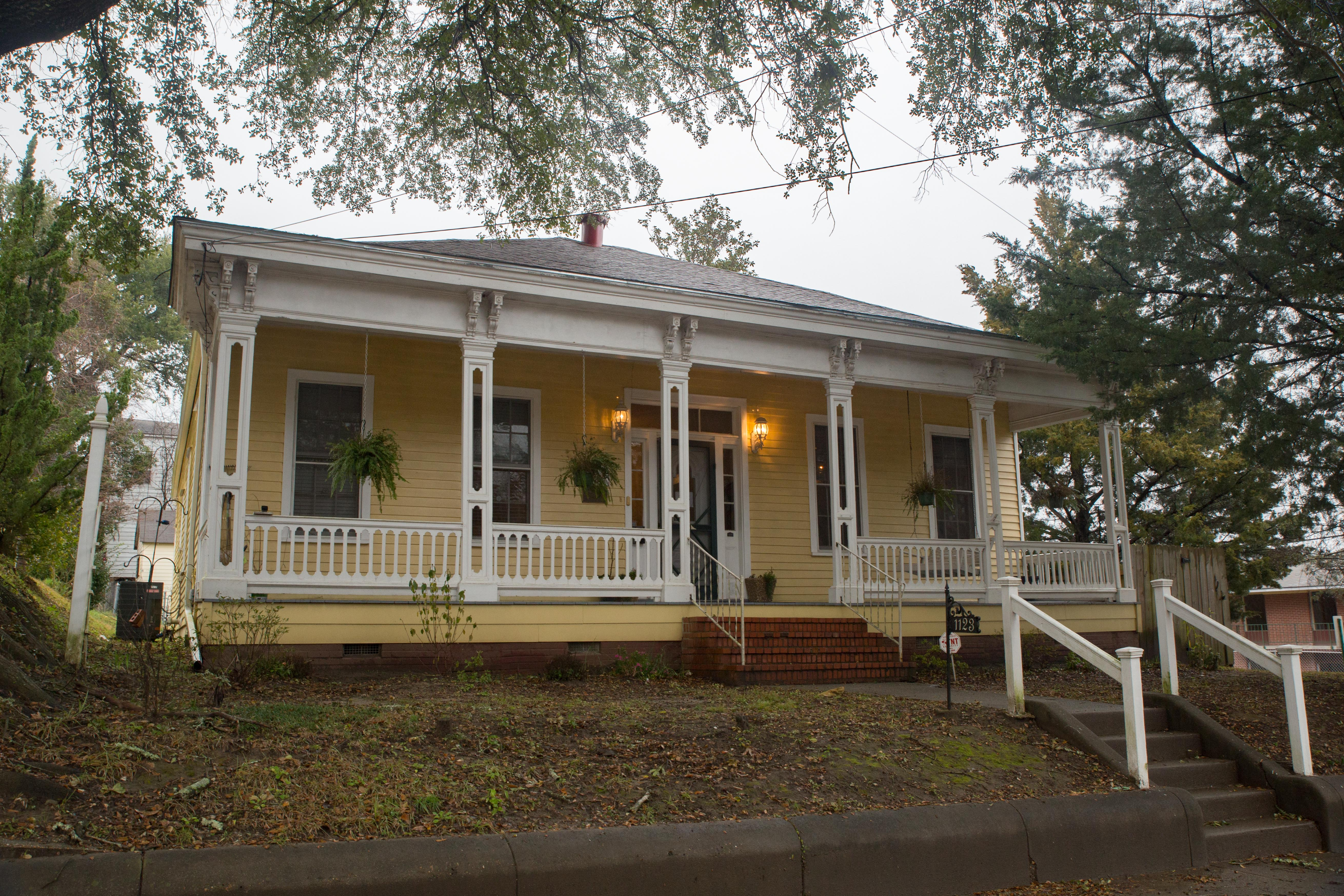
- Location: 1123 South Street, Vicksburg, Warren County, Mississippi, U.S.
- Coordinates: 32.3476°N 90.8767°W
- Built: c. 1872 – c. 1875
- NRHP reference No.: 92000469
- Added to NRHP: May 7, 1992

Belle Fleur is a historic house in Vicksburg, Mississippi, U.S.. It is a late Victorian one-story, five-bay galleried cottage built between c. 1872 – c. 1875 (by an unknown architect). It is a National Register of Historic Places listed place since 1992, and is considered a well intact and preserved example of an Italianate-influenced hip-roofed galleried cottage in Mississippi. It is also part of the Uptown Vicksburg Historic District.

== See also ==
- National Register of Historic Places listings in Warren County, Mississippi
