= The Magnolias (Vicksburg, Mississippi) =

House built c. 1877–1880

- U.S. National Register of Historic Places
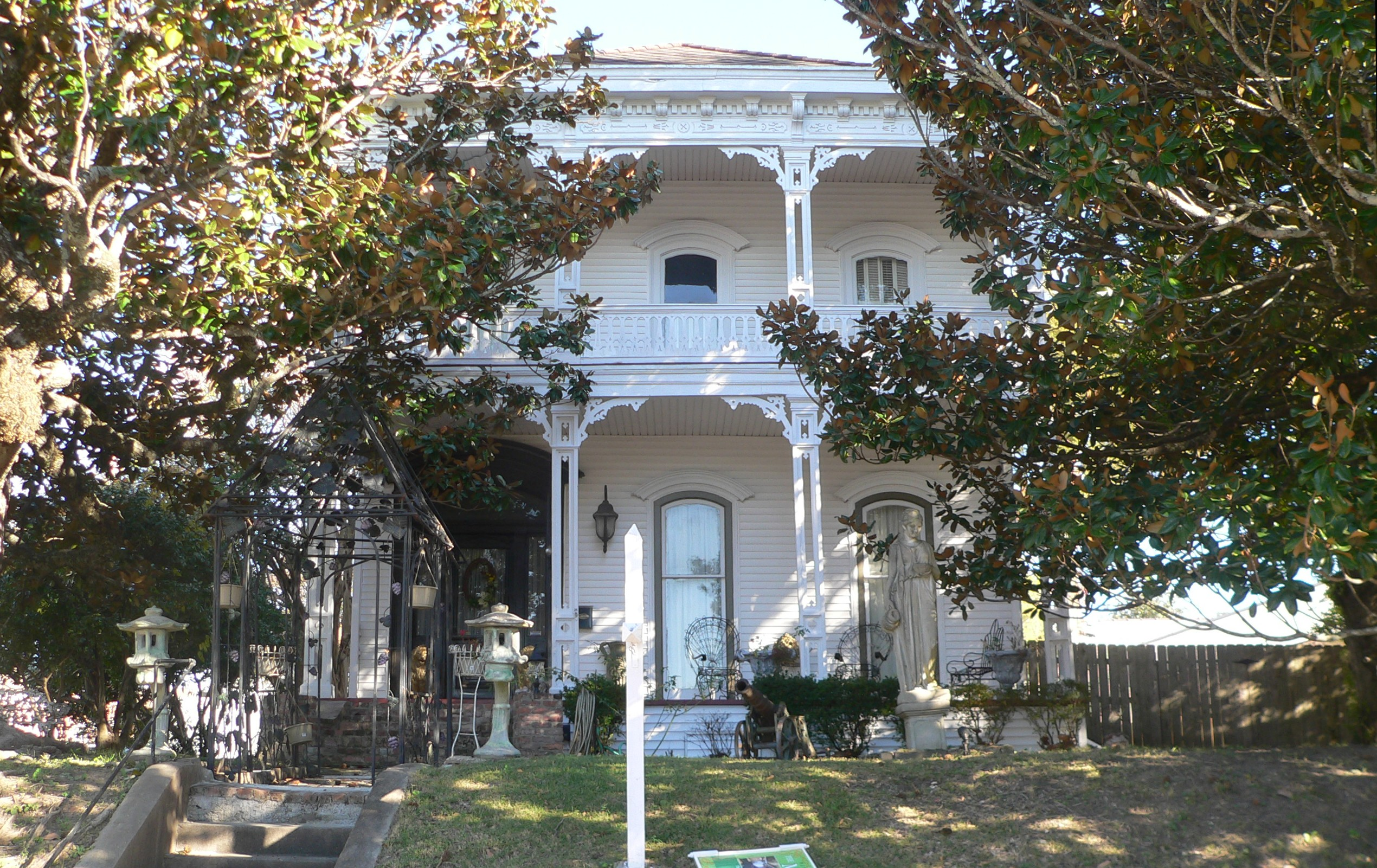
- Location: 1617 Monroe Street; Vicksburg, Mississippi, U.S.
- Coordinates: 32.345804°N 90.880231°W
- Built: c. 1877 – c. 1880
- Architectural style: Late Victorian
- NRHP reference No.: 87000217
- Added to NRHP: February 26, 1987

The Magnolias is a historic house in Vicksburg, Mississippi, U.S.. It is a two-story, framed Late Victorian style residence built between c. 1877 – c. 1880. It is considered a good example of local architecture and still maintains the "Vicksburg pierced columns" on the exterior. Tours of the home are sometimes available, and has been part of the annual Vicksburg Pilgrimage in the autumn. The residence was once owned by the Vick family, the namesake for the city of Vicksburg.

It is a National Register of Historic Places listed place since 1987; and it is part of the South Cherry Street Historic District since 2003.

== See also ==
- National Register of Historic Places listings in Warren County, Mississippi
- The Magnolias (disambiguation)
