= The Magnolias =

The Magnolias may refer to:

Historic places

- The Magnolias (New Iberia, Louisiana), listed on the NRHP
- The Magnolias (Aberdeen, Mississippi), a Mississippi Landmark
- The Magnolias (Vicksburg, Mississippi), listed on the NRHP
- The Magnolias (Jefferson, Texas), listed on the NRHP in Texas

Other uses

- The Magnolias (band), an American indie rock band

== See also ==
- Magnolia (disambiguation)
- Magnolia Plantation (disambiguation)
