= Adolph Rose Building =

Historic building in Mississippi, US

- U.S. National Register of Historic Places
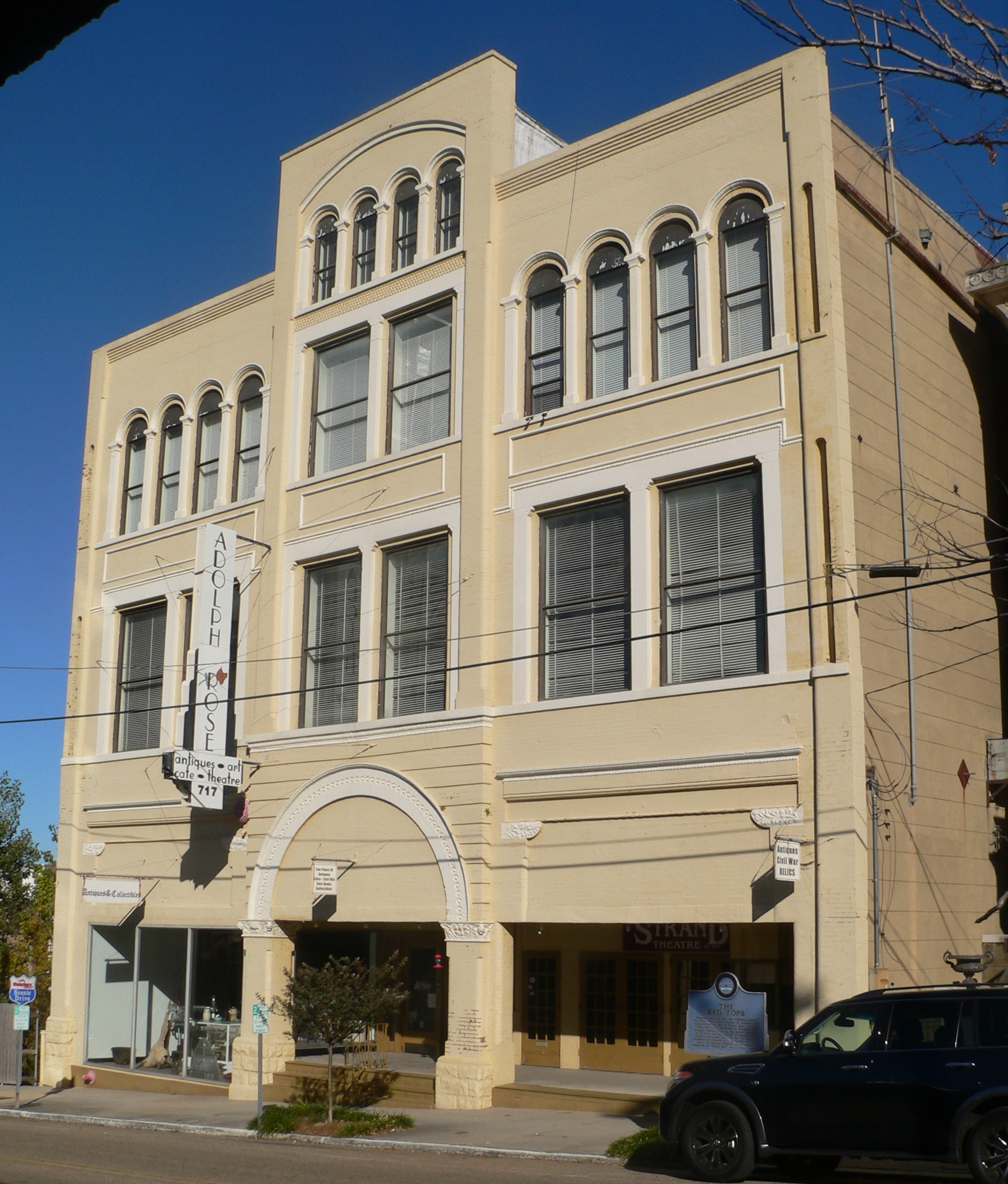
- Adolph Rose Building in 2017
- Location: 717 Clay Street, Vicksburg, Warren County, Mississippi, United States
- Coordinates: 32.350201°N 90.881326°W
- Built: 1890
- Architectural style: Romanesque
- MPS: Vicksburg MPS
- NRHP reference No.: 92001567
- Added to NRHP: November 12, 1992

Adolph Rose Building is a historic commercial building in Vicksburg, Mississippi, U.S.. It has been listed on the National Register of Historic Places since November 12, 1992; and is part of a Uptown Vicksburg Historic District since 1993.

== History ==
The Adolph Rose Building is a Romanesque Revival style brick commercial building with a flat roof located in downtown Vicksburg. It was built in 1890 by Adolph Rose, a dry goods merchant. This building is architecturally significant in the context of commercial architecture in Vicksburg, Mississippi, which experienced a boom period during the late 19th-century. It contains three stories, and the middle bay reaches into a fourth story; the middle bay originally contained a cornice which was damaged during a 1953 tornado.

The right side of the Adolph Rose Building was remodeled in 1934 into the Strand Theater, which remained until 1966. Feld Furniture occupied the building for 40 years, in the 1940s through the 1980s. The building housed Adolph Rose Antiques on the first floor for 20 years, and closed in October 2020 during the COVID-19 pandemic.

== See also ==
- National Register of Historic Places listings in Warren County, Mississippi
