= Hotel Vicksburg =

Historic building in Mississippi, US

- U.S. National Register of Historic Places
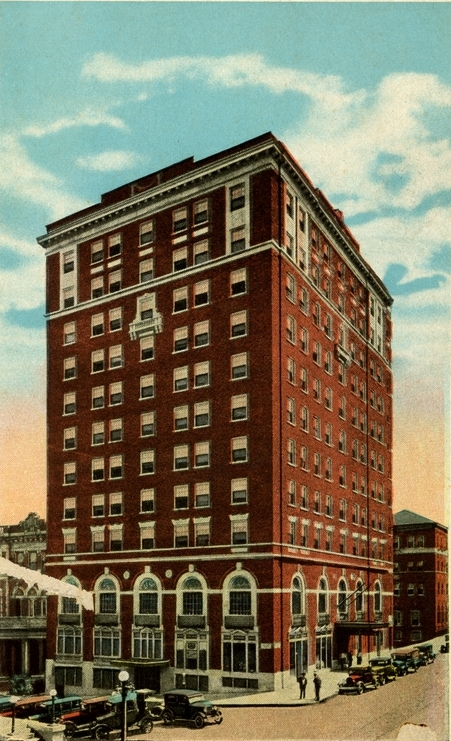

- Location within Mississippi
- Location: 801 Clay Street, Vicksburg, Mississippi, United States
- Coordinates: 32.35°N 90.88055°W
- Architect: H.L. Stevens & Company
- Architectural style: Colonial Revival
- NRHP reference No.: 79001339
- Added to NRHP: June 4, 1979

Hotel Vicksburg, also known as the Vicksburg Apartments, is a historic building in Vicksburg, Mississippi, U.S.. It has been listed on the National Register of Historic Places since June 4, 1979; and is part of a Uptown Vicksburg Historic District since 1993.

== History ==
The Hotel Vicksburg was in constant use as a hotel, and owned by the Magnolia Hotel Company from July 1929 until 1975. It is an eleven-story Colonial Revival style building, designed by the architectural firm of H.L. Stevens & Company.

In the late 1970s, the building was remodeled and turned into apartments. Newbreak Management acquired the building in 2021, and had to temporarily close the building the following year in order to address safety, electrical, and plumbing issues.

== See also ==
- National Register of Historic Places listings in Warren County, Mississippi
