= Magnolia (given name) =

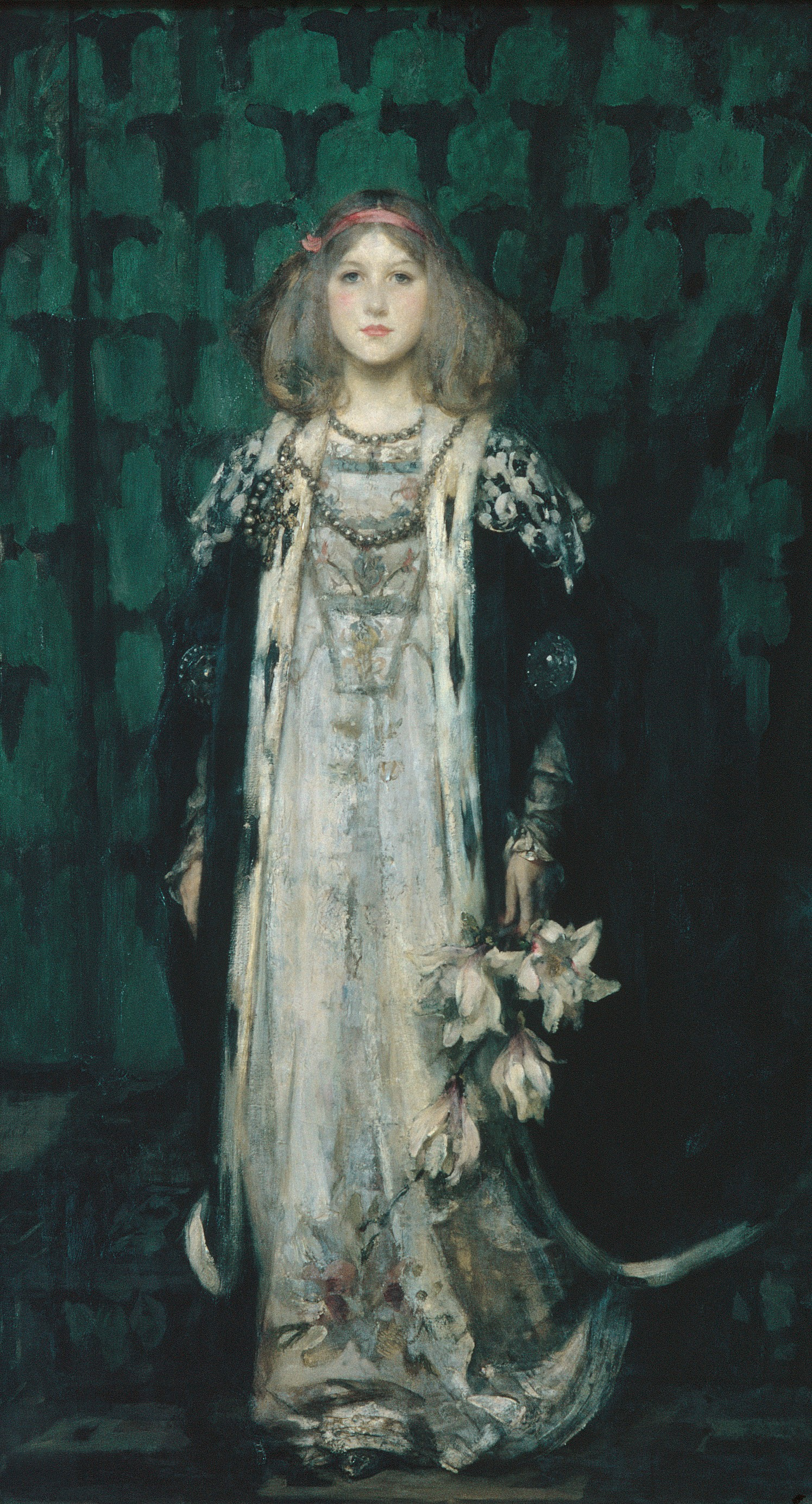
- Magnolia by James Jebusa Shannon, 1899.
- Gender: Feminine

Origin
- Origin: English
- Meaning: flower name

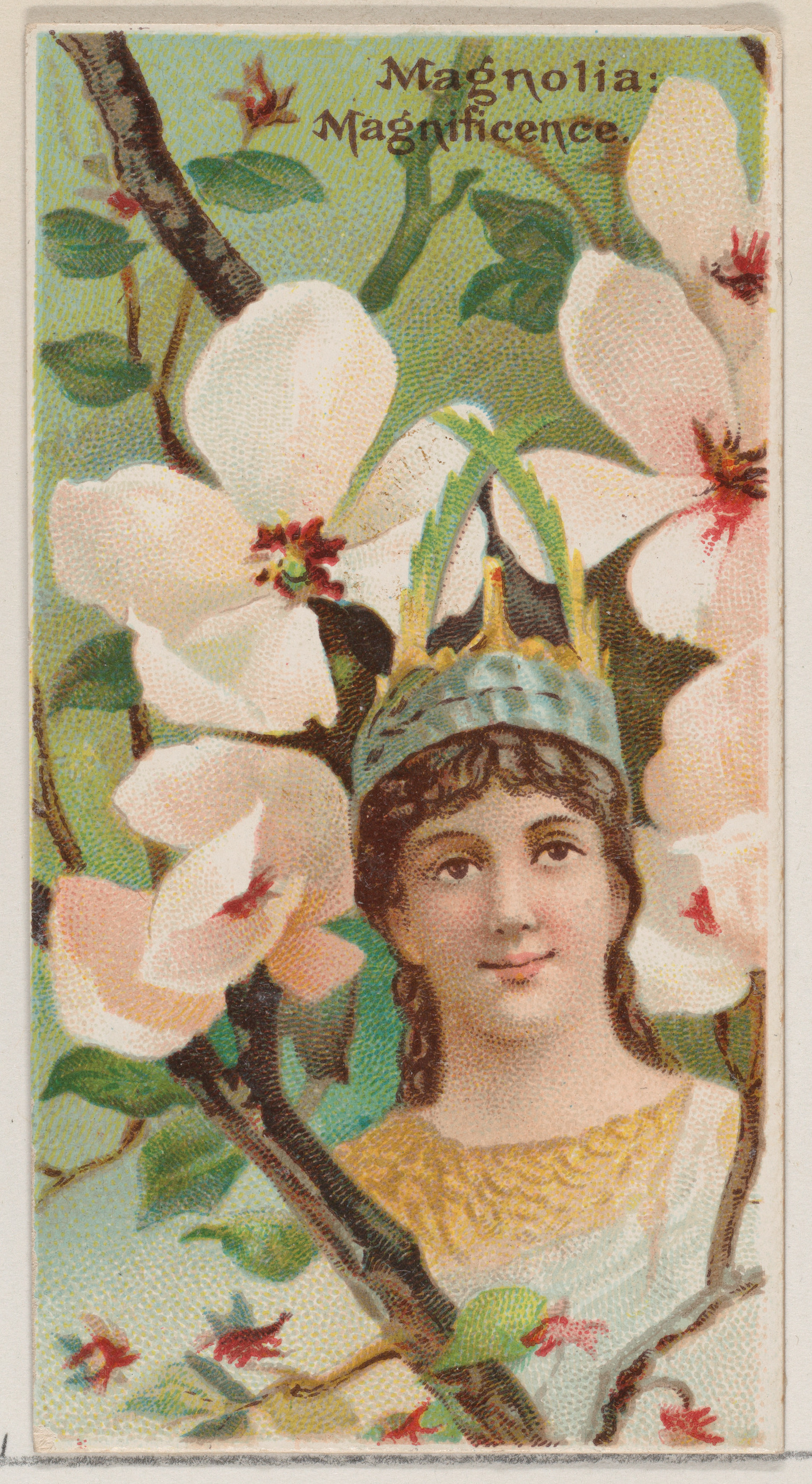
The magnolia is said to signify magnificence in the language of flowers.

Magnolia is an English name taken from the flower name.

== Usage ==
The name was among the 1,000 most common names for girls and women in Brazil between 1930 and 1970. The name has increased in popularity for girls in the United States in recent years. It came into popular use along with other plant and flower names in the late 1800s and early 1900s and was the 420th most popular name for girls in 1909, the height of its early use. It had declined in popularity by the mid 20th century but then returned to the top 1,000 names for newborn American girls in 2013 and was ranked among the top 200 names for girls by 2020. The name ranked among the top 1,000 names for newborn girls in Canada in 2021, the year it ranked 770th on the popularity chart and was given to 36 newborn Canadian girls.

== Women ==
- Magnolia Maymuru (born 1997), Australian actress and model

== See also ==
- Magnolia Shorty, stage name of American rapper Renetta Yemika Lowe-Bridgewater (1982–2010)
- Magnolia Thunderpussy, stage name of Patricia Mallon (1939–1996), American burlesque performer, radio personality, filmmaker and restaurateur from San Francisco, California.
