= Shlenker House =

Historic house in Warren County, Mississippi

- U.S. National Register of Historic Places
- Mississippi Landmark
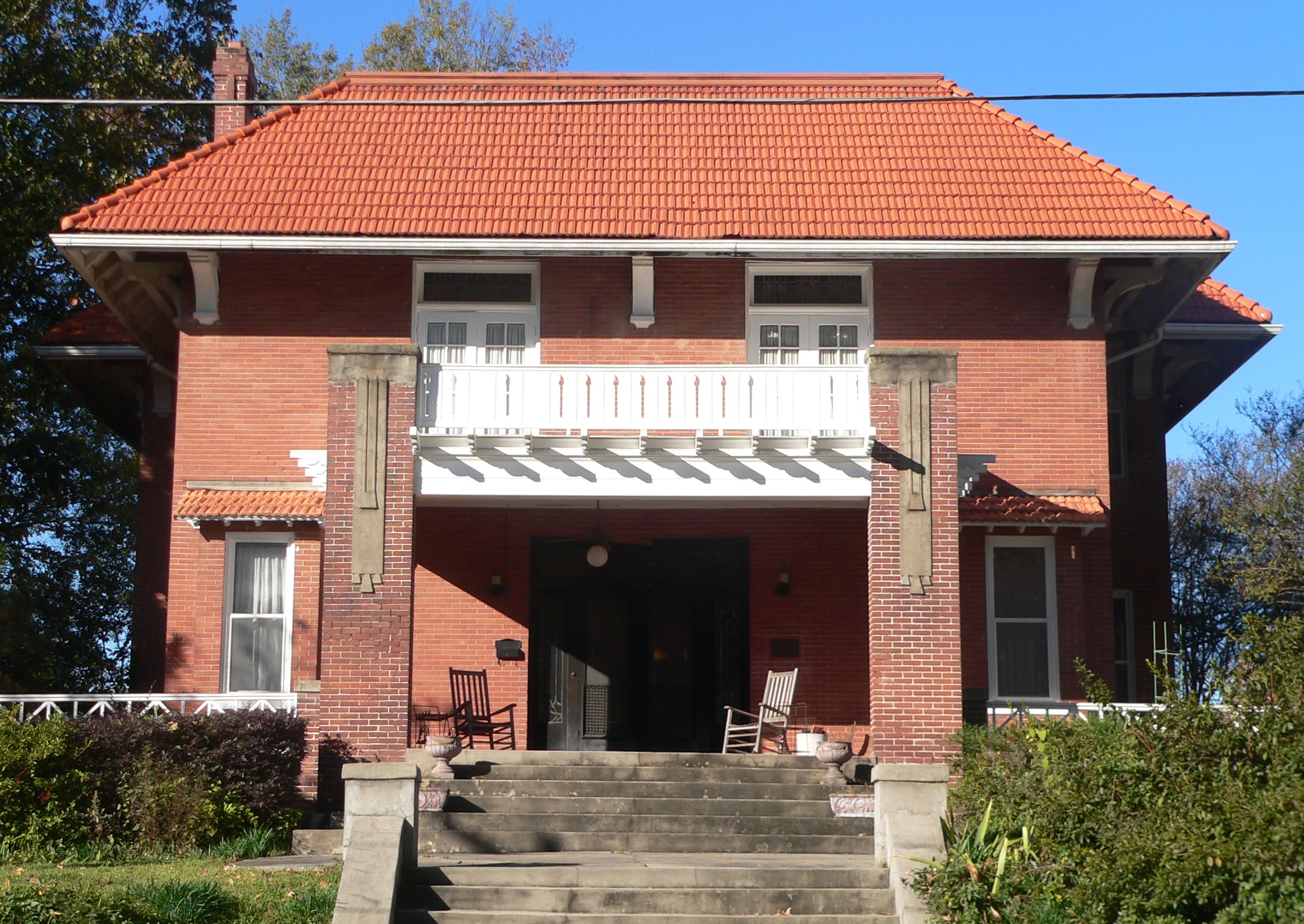
- Location: 2212 Cherry Street, Vicksburg, Warren County, Mississippi, U.S.
- Coordinates: 32.33901°N 90.87946°W
- Built: c. 1907
- Architectural style: Prairie School, Bungalow/Craftsman
- NRHP reference No.: 83003975
- USMS No.: 49-VKS-1092.1-NR-NRD-ML

Significant dates
- Added to NRHP: November 17, 1983
- Designated USMS: June 29, 2000

Shlenker House is a historic house built in c. 1907 in Vicksburg, Mississippi, U.S.. It is also known as the D.J. Shlenker House, and the Rig Perry House. Shlenker House is a historical reminder of the Jewish immigrant community in Vicksburg during the early-20th century. It is a National Register of Historic Places listed place since 1983; and is listed as a Mississippi Landmark since 2000. The house is also part of the South Cherry Street Historic District. It is an example of early 20th-century eclecticism in architecture in the city of Vicksburg.

== History ==
It is a two-story, brick eclectic residence with influence from the Prairie School and Bungalow styles (by an unknown architect). The house was constructed c. 1907 by D.J. Shlenker (or David Jacob Shlenker), who came from a prominent German Jewish family. Shlenker had owned a dry good store in Vicksburg around the 1880s, and later inheritated his father Jacob Shlenker's cotton factory and warehouse in Vicksburg. D.J. Shlenker died in 1913. In September 1915, the Shlenker family sold the house to Hester Craig (who at the time was engaged to Gray Flowers).

The house once had leaded stained glass windows, which were vandalized and no longer exist. The porch and veranda railings have also been modified since the house was initially built.

== See also ==
- National Register of Historic Places listings in Warren County, Mississippi
- Jews in the Southern United States
