= Magnolia Park =

Magnolia Park may refer to one of the following:

- Magnolia Park (Burbank), a neighborhood in Burbank, California
- Magnolia Park (Houston), a former city and now section of Houston, Texas, United States
- Magnolia Park (Hillsboro, Oregon), a city park in Hillsboro, Oregon, United States
- Magnolia Park (Miami), a neighborhood within the City of Miami, Florida, United States
- Magnolia Park (Seattle), a park in Seattle, Washington, United States
- Magnolia Park (Apopka, Florida), a park in Apopka, Florida, United States
- Magnolia Park Town Center, a shopping center in Greenville, South Carolina
- Magnolia Park (band), a band from Orlando, Florida
