= Beck House (Vicksburg, Mississippi) =

Historic house in Mississippi, U.S.

- U.S. National Register of Historic Places
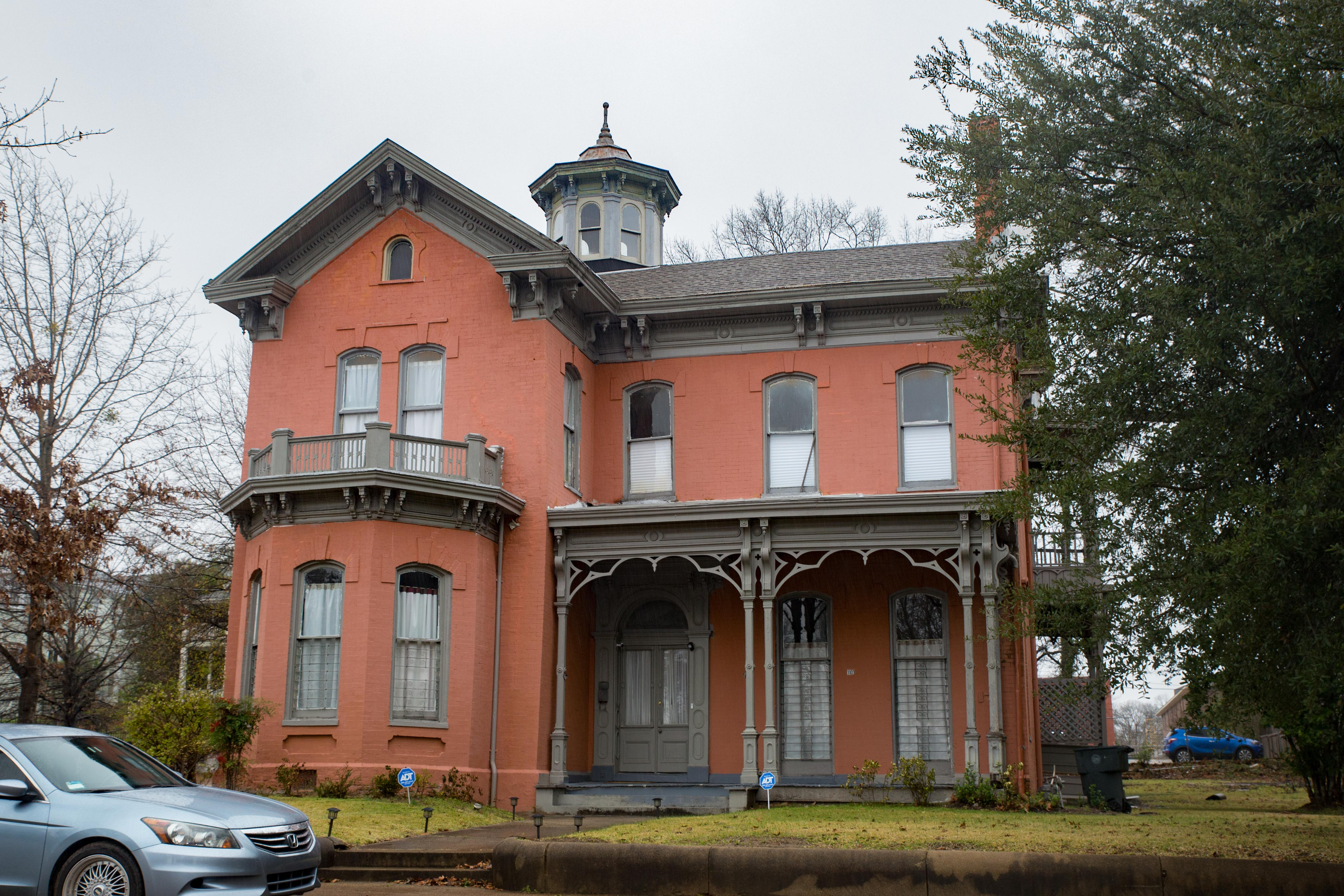
- Beck House in 2019

- Location within Mississippi
- Location: 1101 South St., Vicksburg, Warren County, Mississippi, United States
- Built: c. 1875
- Architect: R.F. Beck
- Architectural style: Italianate
- NRHP reference No.: 79001336
- Added to NRHP: March 29, 1979

Beck House is a historic residence in Vicksburg, Mississippi, United States. It is listed on the National Register of Historic Places since March 29, 1979.

== History ==
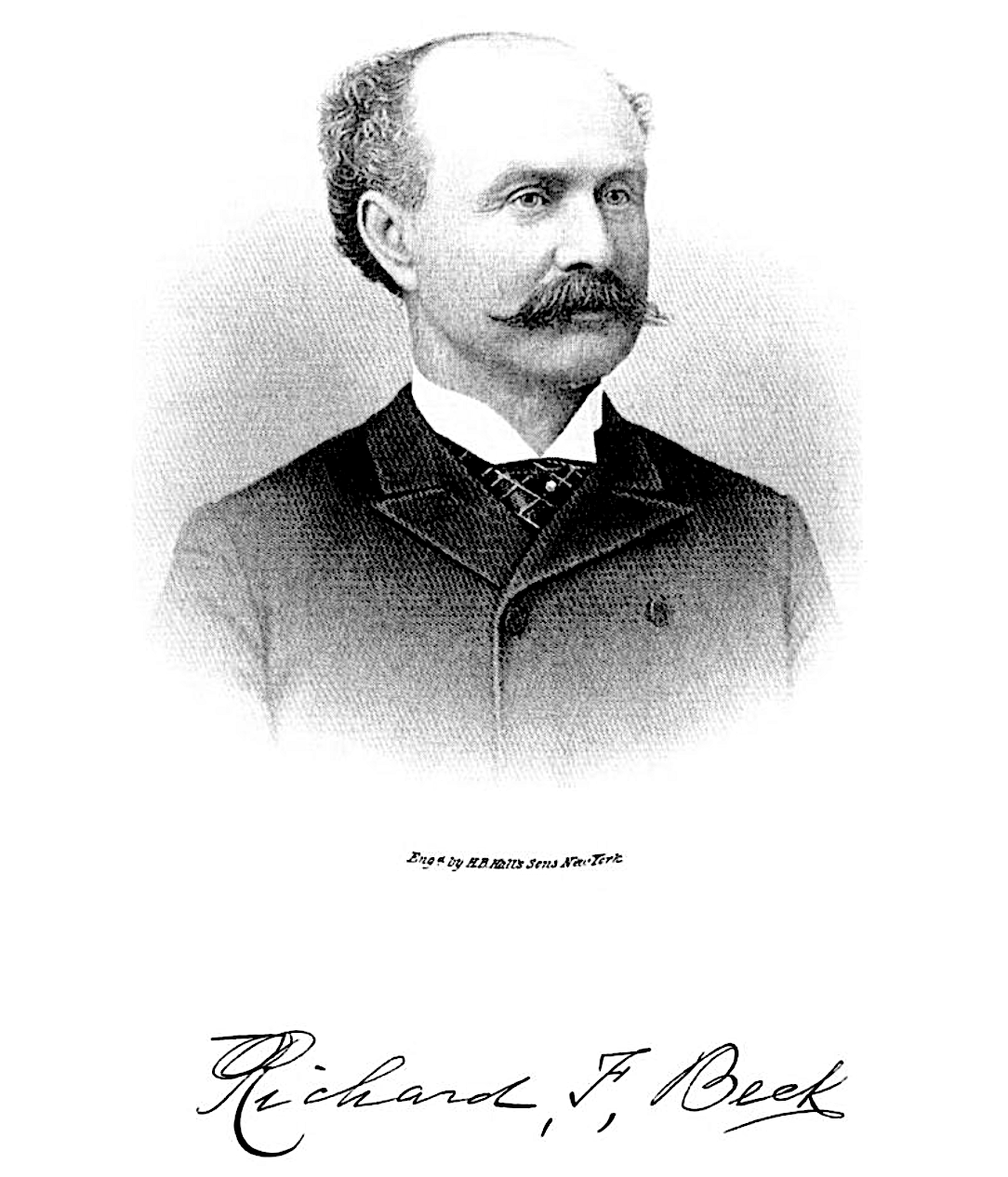
Richard F. Beck (1841–1891)

The Beck House was constructed as a residence for Richard F. Beck (1841–1891) and his family, he was a prominent building contractor, businessman, and politician in Vicksburg. R.F. Beck was from Poughkeepsie in upstate New York, and arrived in Vicksburg in 1865, after the end of the American Civil War and during a time in a need for contractors.

It was built in c. 1875, in the High Victorian Italianate style. In 1876, Beck married Mary Ellen Rigby and they had two children, Thomas and Mary. After Beck's death in 1891, his window re-married her chauffeur Samuel Robert Hughes, and the family continued to live in the Beck House.

The house remained in the Beck family until 1971, when the house was sold to the Community Council, a charitable organization. It was converted into a "halfway house", and the building suffered from neglect. In 1978, the Beck House was sold to Harry M. Yoste and Beverly A. Bolton, who restored it to a single family residence. In 1989, the house was sold to Robert Rosenthall, who had engaged in a long battle with city's permitting department. The house fell in disrepair in 2003.

== See also ==
- National Register of Historic Places listings in Warren County, Mississippi
