= Uptown Vicksburg Historic District =

Area of Vicksburg in Mississippi, US

- U.S. National Register of Historic Places
- U.S. Historic district
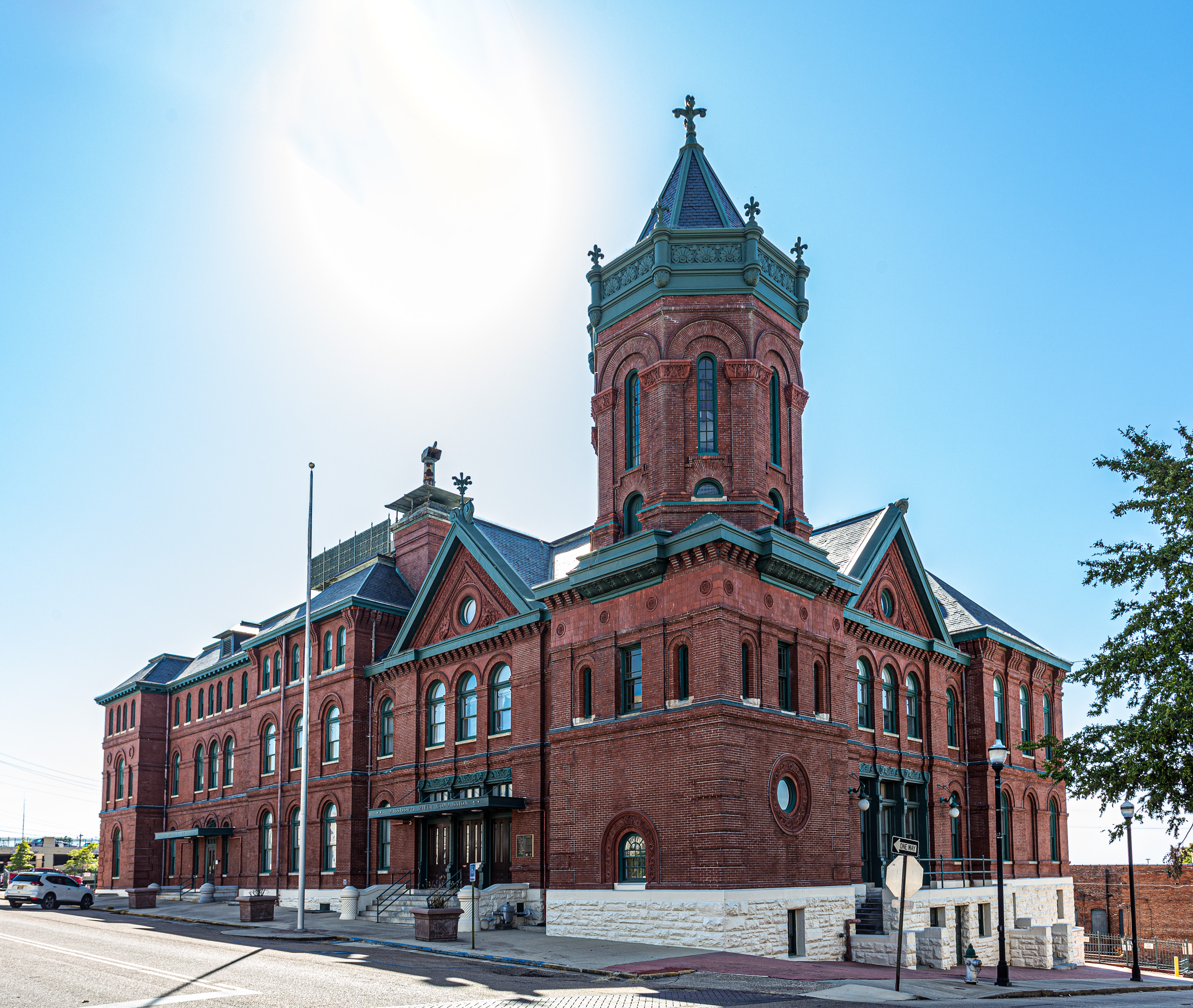
- Mississippi River Commission, Vicksburg (formerly Vicksburg Post Office and Customs House)

- Location within Mississippi Location within the United States
- Interactive map showing the location for Uptown Vicksburg Historic District
- Location: Roughly bounded by Locust, South, Washington, and Clay Streets.; also mostly on Washington St. between Grove and Veto Streets, Vicksburg, Warren County, Mississippi, U.S.
- Coordinates: 32.348611°N 90.879167°W
- MPS: Vicksburg MPS
- NRHP reference No.: 93000850
- Added to NRHP: August 19, 1993

Uptown Vicksburg Historic District is a historic district in Vicksburg, Mississippi, U.S.. The district is bounded by Locust Street, South Street, Washington Street, and Clay Street; also on Washington Streets between Grove and Veto Street; and also roughly bounded by Washington Street, Grove Street, China Street, Clay Street, Locust Street, Veto Street and South Street (north boundary of the South Cherry Street Historic District).

It is a National Register of Historic Places listed place since 1993, with boundary increases in 2004 and 2020.

== History ==
In 1891, the Uptown Vicksburg Historic District was designed and arranged by city founder Rev. Newit Vick, and his son-in-law John Lane. The Uptown district includes sixty-eight contributing buildings, one contributing site, one contributing fountain, and three contributing monuments.

The Uptown Vicksburg Historic District was mostly built between 1830 and 1940, with sixty one contributing buildings in the district built during this period; and with additional building happening up until the 1970s. The earliest building in extant is the Luckett Compound (1830).

== Notable buildings and structures ==
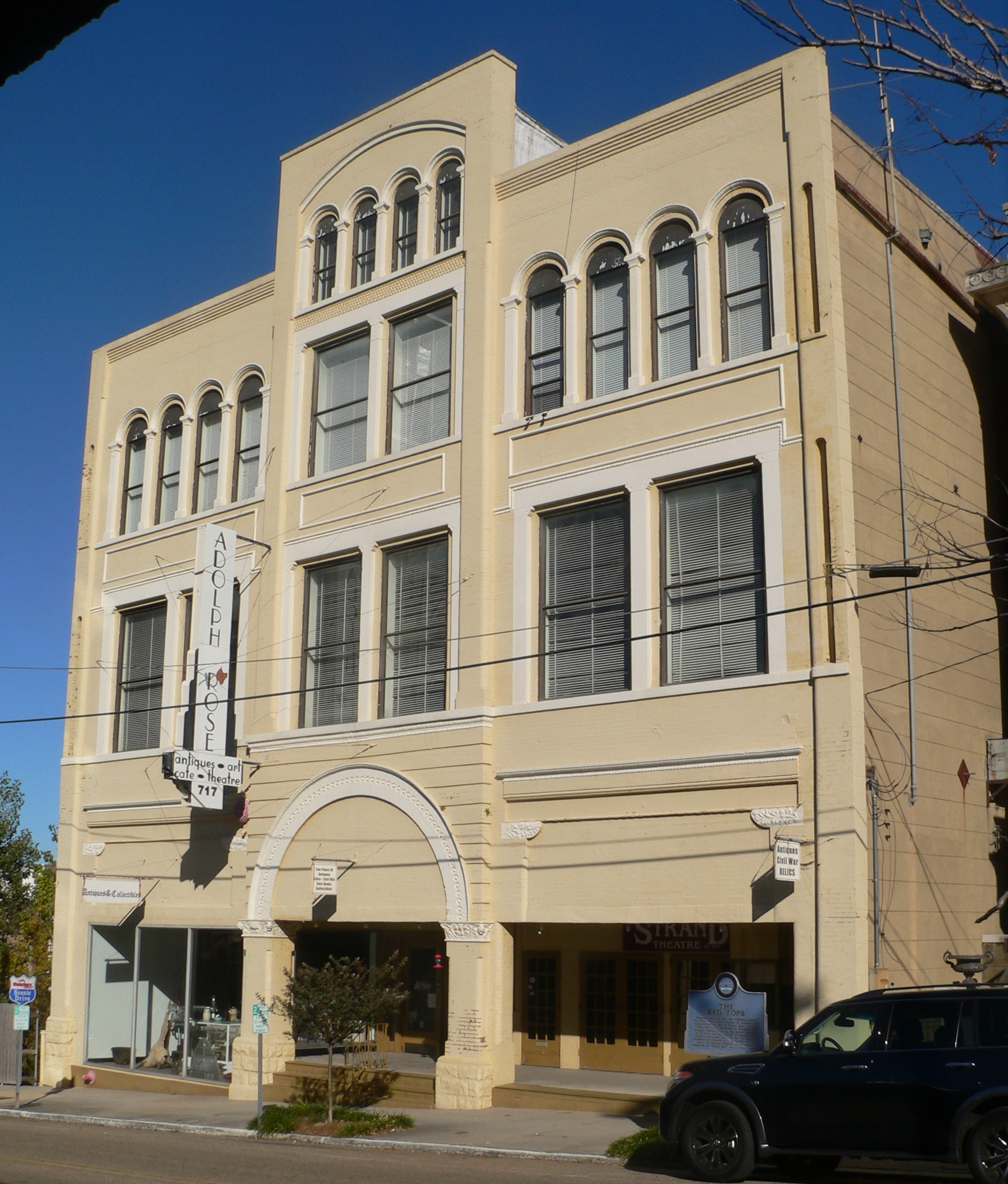
Adolph Rose Building, Vicksburg

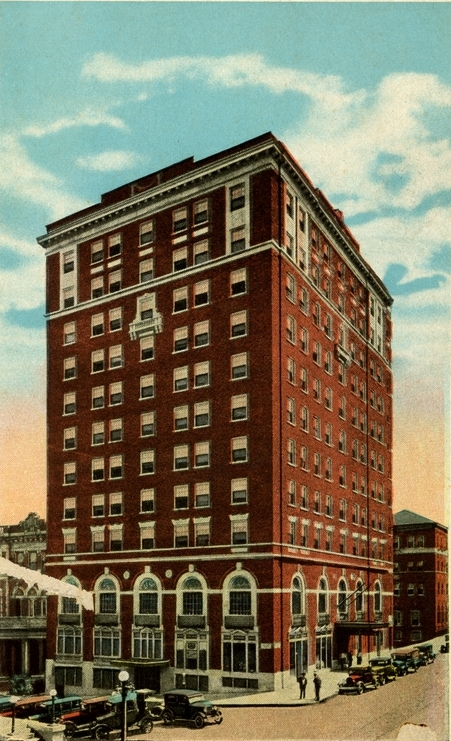
Hotel Vicksburg

=== Buildings ===
- Luckett Compound (built c. 1830 – c. 1840; four buildings), Crawford Street; NRHP-listed
- Vicksburg Sanitarium (built c. 1830s), 900 Crawford Street
- Pemberton's Headquarters (or Willis–Cowan House) (built c. 1834), 1018 Crawford Street; NRHP-listed
- Church of the Holy Trinity (c. 1870), 900 South Street; NRHP-listed
- Belle Fleur (built 1872), 1123 South Street; NRHP-listed
- Vicksburg Post Office and Customs House (built c. 1894; now the Mississippi River Commission), 1400 Walnut Street
- Bonelli House (built c. 1889), 1100 Clay Street
- Blum House (built 1902), 1420 Cherry Street; NRHP-listed
- Vicksburg City Hall (built 1903), 1401 Walnut Street
- McDermott House (built c. 1905), 1100 South Street; NRHP-listed
- Adolph Rose House, or Rose House (built 1897), 1414 Cherry Street
- Adolph Rose Building (built 1890), 717 Clay Street; NRHP-listed
- B'nai B'rith Literary Club (built 1917), 721 Clay Street; nicknamed the B.B. Club
- Crawford Street United Methodist Church (built 1925), 1408 Cherry Street
- Hotel Vicksburg (built 1928), 801 Clay Street; NRHP-listed
- United States Post Office and Federal Building (built 1935), 820 Crawford Street
- St. Francis Xavier Elementary School (built 1937), 1303 Cherry Street
- Vicksburg Evening Post building (built 1952), 920 South Street
- St. Paul's Catholic Church (built 1955), 717 Crawford Street

=== Memorials and fountain ===
- Louisiana Confederate Memorial (built 1887), Monroe Street; erected by Louisiana Confederate soldiers from their military unit members that died in Vicksburg in 1862–1863
- Vicksburg Memorial Rose Garden (built c. 1890), Monroe Street; dedicated to local soldiers
- World War I Memorial (built 1919), Monroe Street
- Bloom Fountain (built 1927), Monroe Street; designed and built by Albert Weiblen Marble and Granite Company, New Orleans
- War Memorial (built 1986; non-contributing), Monroe Street; dedicated to soldiers from the city of Vicksburg and from Warren County serving in World War I, World War II, Korean War, and the Vietnam War

== See also ==
- National Register of Historic Places listings in Warren County, Mississippi
