= Magnolia Township =

Magnolia Township may refer to:

- Magnolia Township, Columbia County, Arkansas, in Columbia County, Arkansas
- Magnolia Township, Putnam County, Illinois
- Magnolia Township, Harrison County, Iowa
- Magnolia Township, Rock County, Minnesota
- Magnolia Township, Duplin County, North Carolina, in Duplin County, North Carolina
