= Pemberton's Headquarters =

- U.S. National Register of Historic Places
- U.S. National Historic Landmark
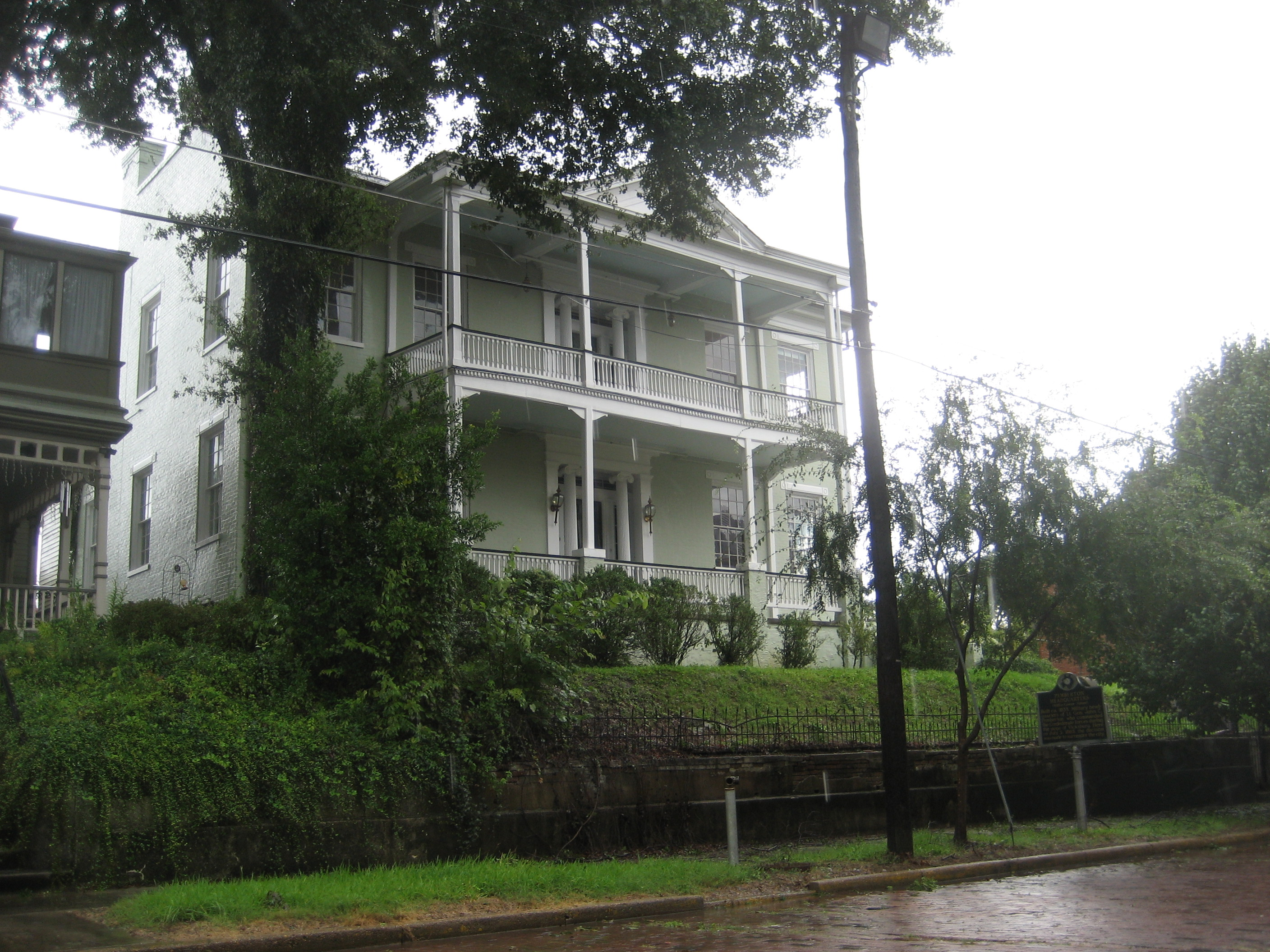
- Pemberton's Headquarters in 2008

- Location within Mississippi Location within the United States
- Location: 1018 or 1020 Crawford Street, Vicksburg, Mississippi
- Coordinates: 32°20′53.68″N 90°52′39.53″W
- Built: 1836
- Architectural style: Greek Revival, Federal
- NRHP reference No.: 70000319

Significant dates
- Added to NRHP: July 23, 1970
- Designated NHL: December 8, 1976

Pemberton's Headquarters, also known as the Willis-Cowan House, is a historic house museum at 1018 Crawford Street in Vicksburg, Mississippi. Built in 1836, it served as the headquarters for Confederate General John C. Pemberton during most of the 47-day Siege of Vicksburg. It was also the site where Pemberton surrendered the city to U.S. Major General Ulysses S. Grant on July 4, 1863. The house is owned by the National Park Service and is open to the public as part of Vicksburg National Military Park. The house was declared a National Historic Landmark in 1976.

== Description and history ==
Pemberton's Headquarters is located on the eastern fringe of Vicksburg's downtown area, on the south side of Crawford Street just west of Adams Street. It is a two-story brick building set well above the street, from which a retaining wall and steep terraced landscaping separate it. A concrete stair climbs through the terracing to provide access to the front of the property. The house is a large L-shaped structure with a brick front section and a rear wood-frame addition. The front portion of the house was built in stages, with the initial structure of 1836 consisting of a main hall and flanking parlors, with a porch (probably smaller but more architecturally elaborate than the present one) sheltering the entrance. This was enlarged in brick in about 1850, with the rearmost additions coming around the turn of the 20th century.

The house was probably built by William Bobb, who sold it in 1836 to John Willis, an area plantation owner. It was under Willis's ownership at the American Civil War's outbreak. When the war came to Vicksburg, Willis's house, one of the largest in the city, was chosen by Confederate General John C. Pemberton as the headquarters for the city's defense. Here, Pemberton and his subordinates planned their military activities and surrendered on July 3, 1863.

The Willises sold the house in 1886, and in 1890 it was bought by Mary Cowan, the wife of a Confederate veteran who died two years later. Cowan died in 1914, and her estate sold it to the Sisters of Mercy, who operated a convent and school across the street. The house was used as part of their facilities (and called "St. Anthony's Hall") until 1973 when it was sold into private hands. In need of significant restoration then, it continued to decline until the 1990s, when it was sufficiently restored to operate as a bed and breakfast inn for several years. That enterprise failed and stood vacant until the National Park Service acquired it in 2003 for inclusion as an element of the Vicksburg National Military Park. Although most of the park's facilities are on the city's outskirts, the house is now used to interpret the Confederate leadership's experiences and the city conditions during the siege.

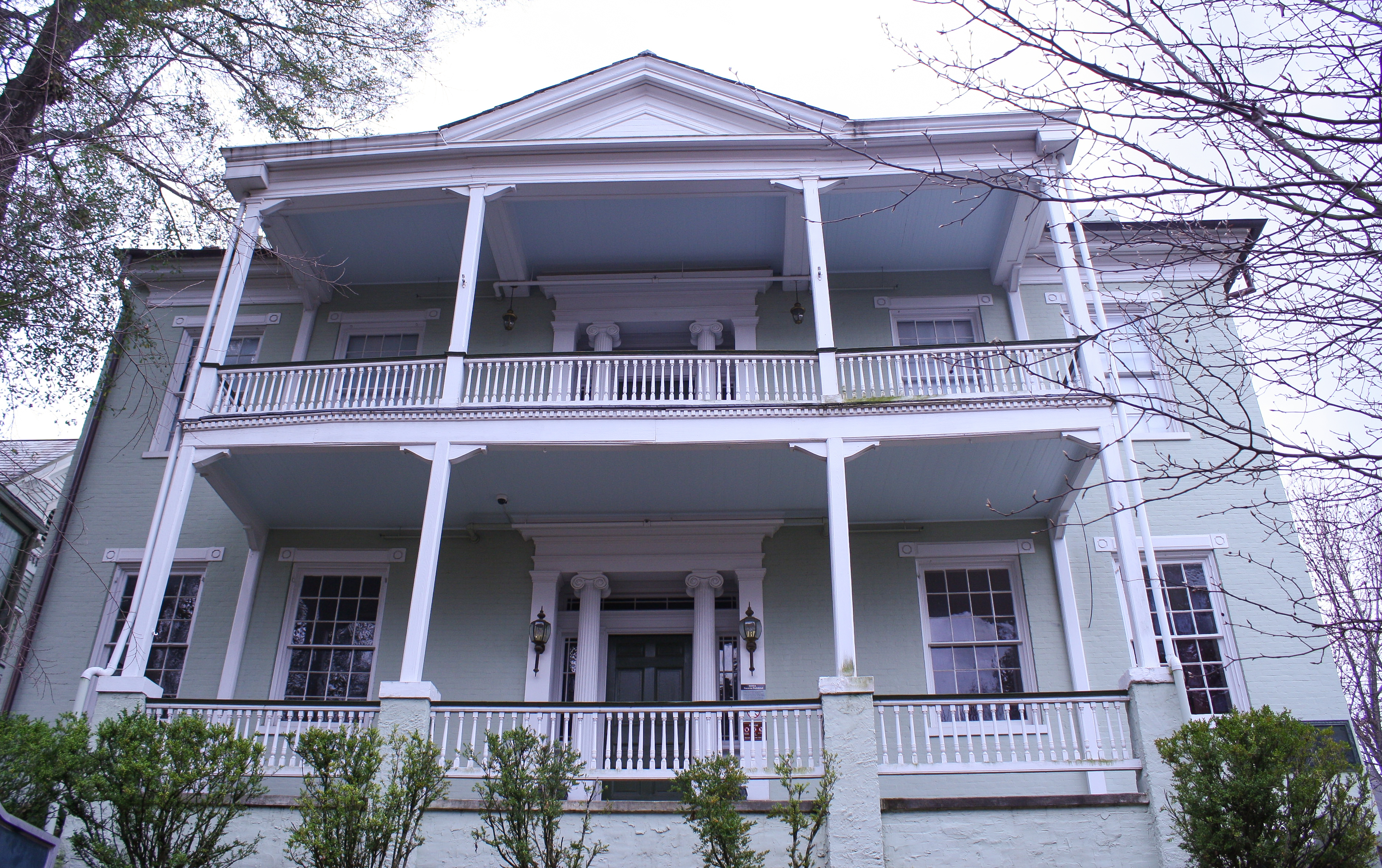
Front view

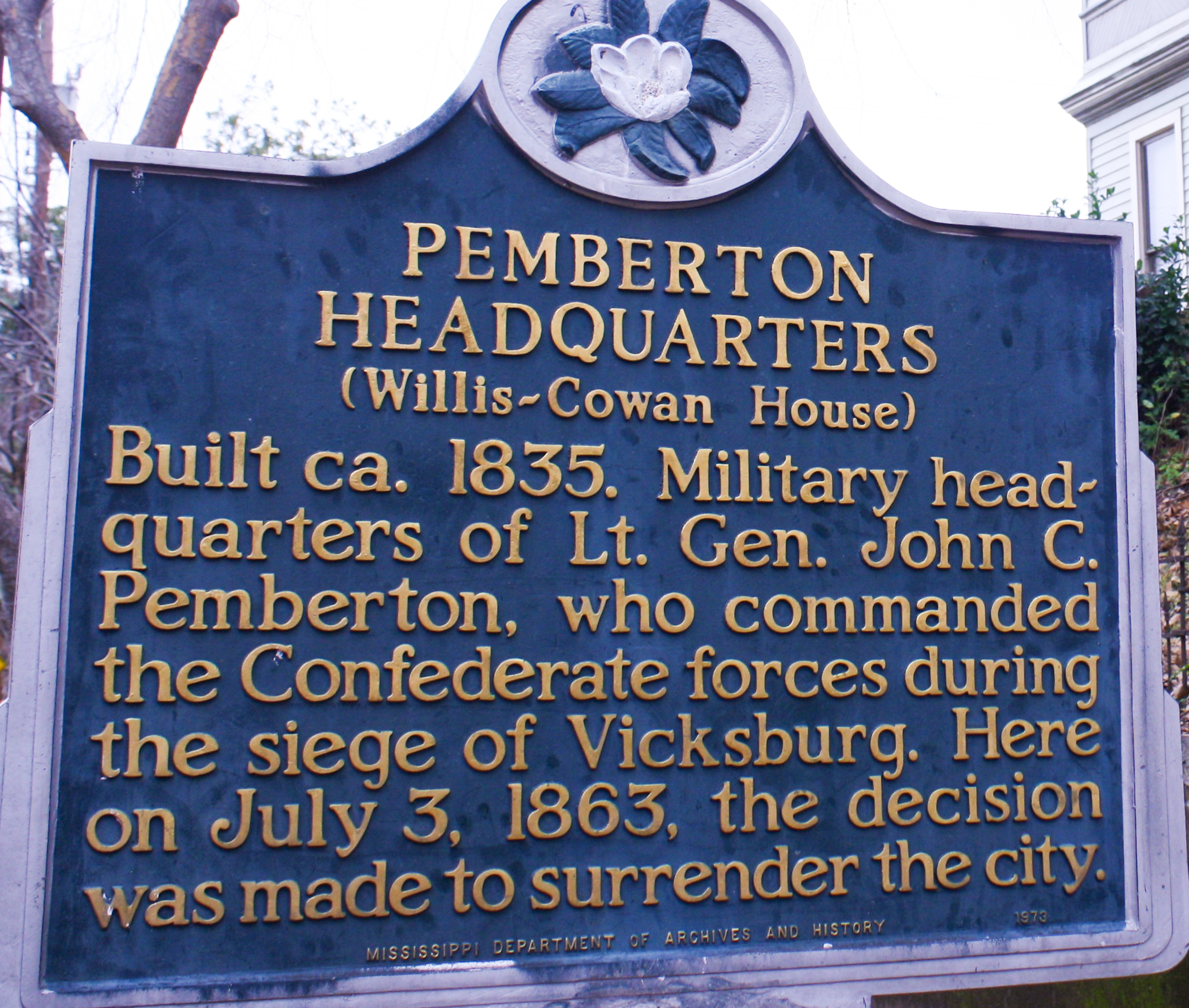
Sign outside Pemberton's Headquarters

== See also ==
- List of National Historic Landmarks in Mississippi
- National Register of Historic Places listings in Warren County, Mississippi
