= South Cherry Street Historic District (Vicksburg, Mississippi) =

Historic district in Warren County, Mississippi, U.S.

- U.S. National Register of Historic Places
- U.S. Historic district
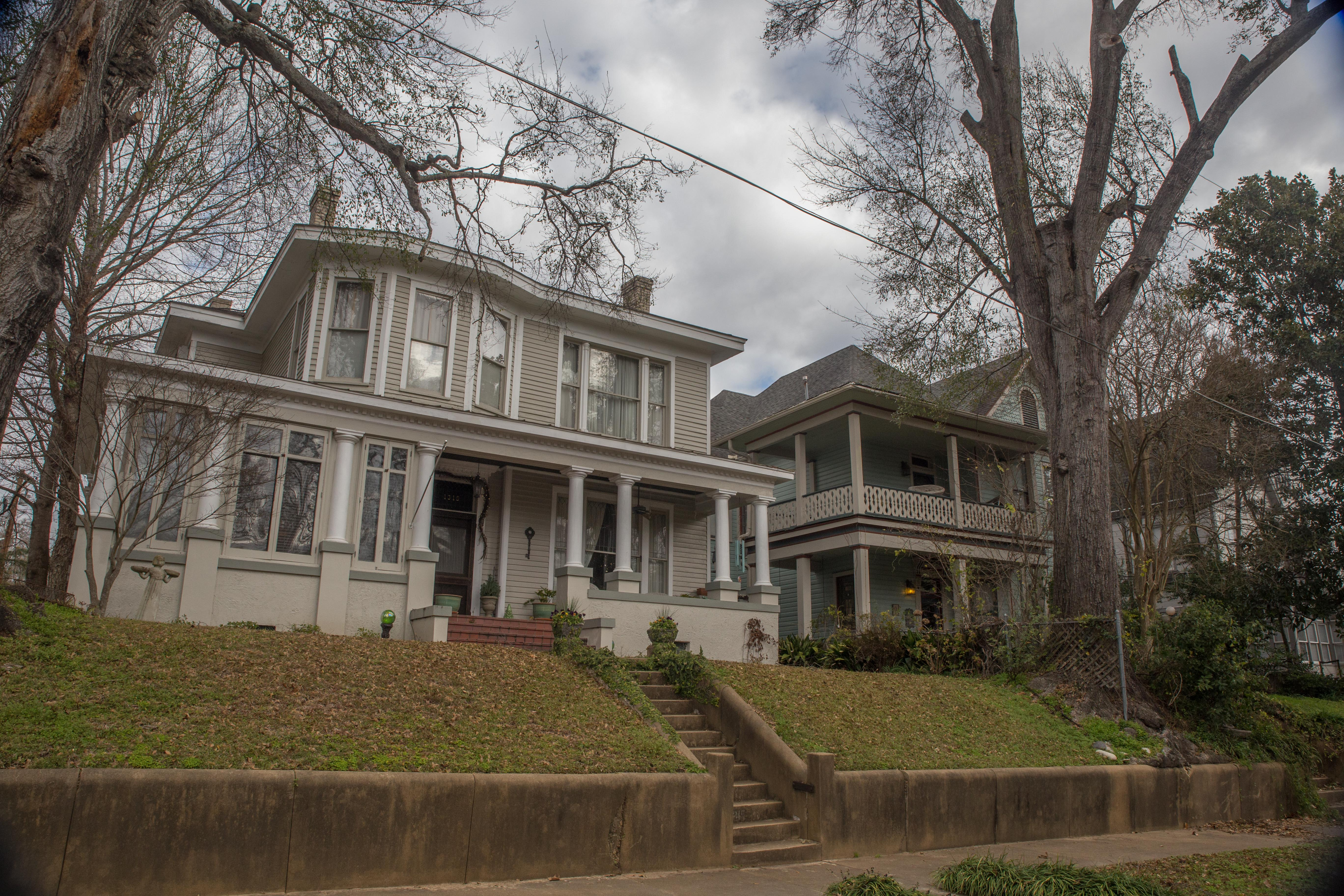
- Location: Cherry and Drummond Sts. from Harrison St. to Bowmar St. and including Chambers and Baum Sts., Vicksburg, Warren County, Mississippi, U.S.
- Coordinates: 32.3390°N 90.8791°W
- MPS: Vicksburg MPS
- NRHP reference No.: 03001140
- Added to NRHP: November 14, 2003

South Cherry Street Historic District is a historic district in Vicksburg, Mississippi, U.S.. The district is roughly rectangular in shape and includes Cherry Street and Monroe and Drummond Streets, from just south of South Street (the south boundary of the Uptown Vicksburg Historic District) to Bowmar Street on the south and includes Baum and Chambers streets to Stout's Bayou.

It is a National Register of Historic Places listed place since 2003.

== History ==
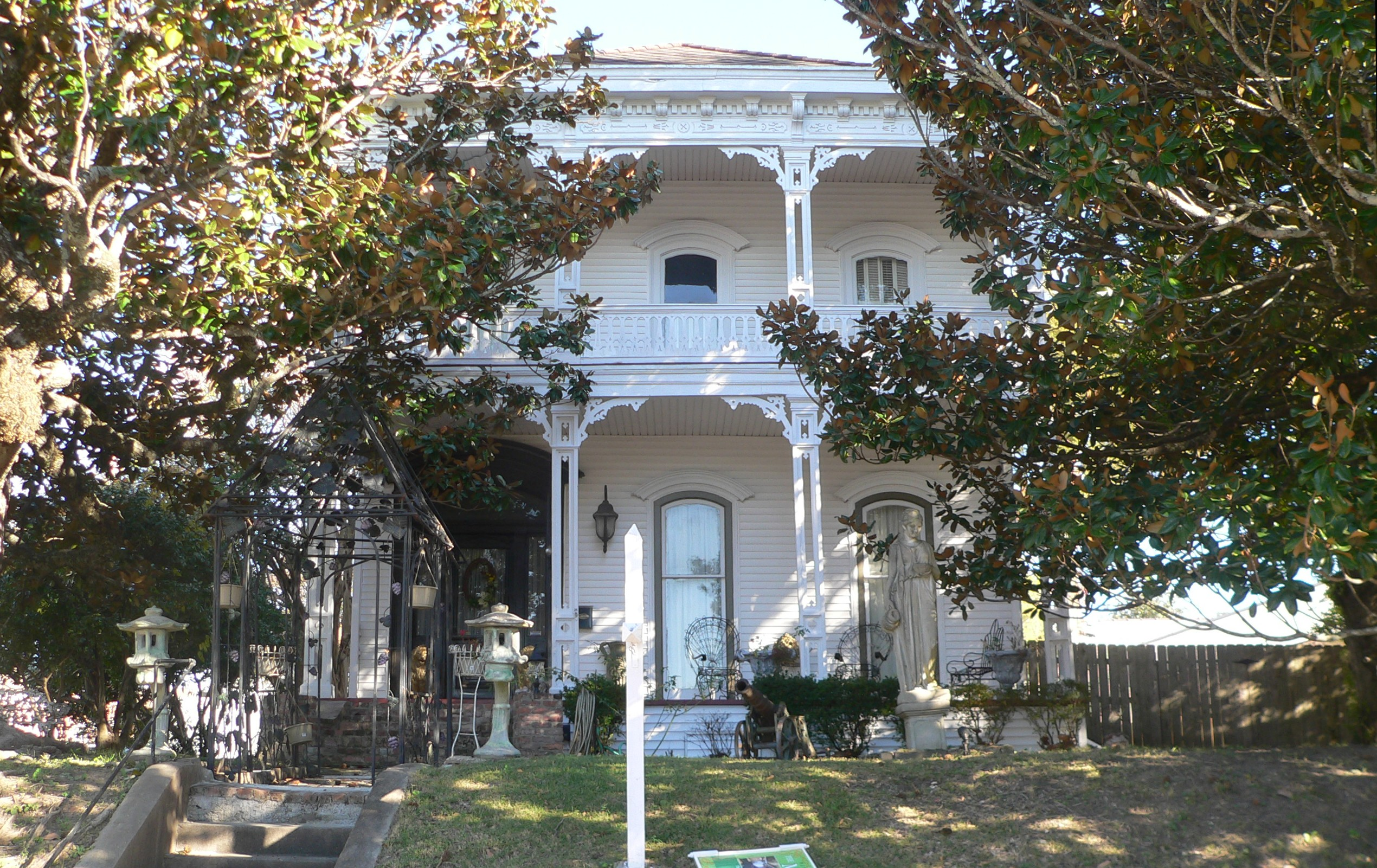
The Magnolias, Vicksburg

The South Cherry Street Historic District contains 186 contributing properties and 32 non-contributing properties. Fourteen of the contributing properties are listed in the National Register of Historic Places, including Carr Junior High School, the Feld Home (two buildings), the Craig–Flowers House (three buildings), Fannie–Willis Johnson Home (two buildings), the Fitz–Hugh Hall (two buildings), The Magnolias, and the Shlenker House (two buildings).

The majority of the buildings in South Cherry Street were constructed during the city's boom period of 1880 to 1910.

Architectural styles in the district include Vicksburg architectural types typically found, including the 2-bay shotgun, the 3, 4 and 5-bay galleried cottages and the 3-bay galleried townhouse. Also represented are Queen Anne, Greek Revival, Italianate, Shingle, Romanesque Revival, Colonial Revival, Neoclassical, Tudor Gothic, Tudor Revival, Mission Revival, Mediterranean, Spanish Revival, Italian Renaissance, Prairie, American Foursquare, Craftsman Bungalow, and Ranch styles.

The district includes two structures which are the Cherry Street Bridge (1911), and Baum Street, a brick paved street. Streets in the South Cherry Street Historic District were all paved in brick beginning around 1910, however only Baum Street remains uncovered.

== Notable buildings ==
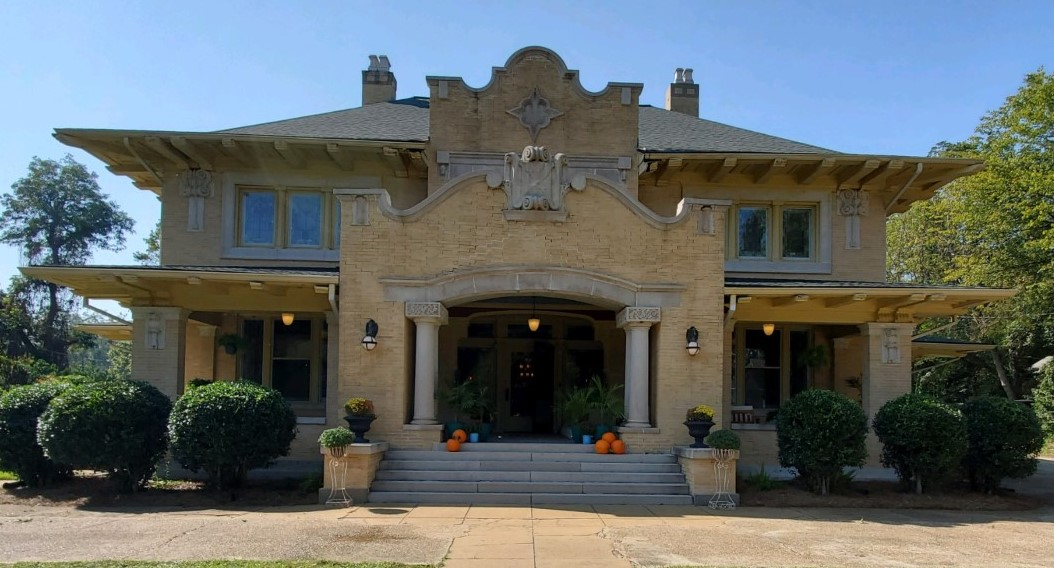
Fannie–Willis Johnson House, Vicksburg

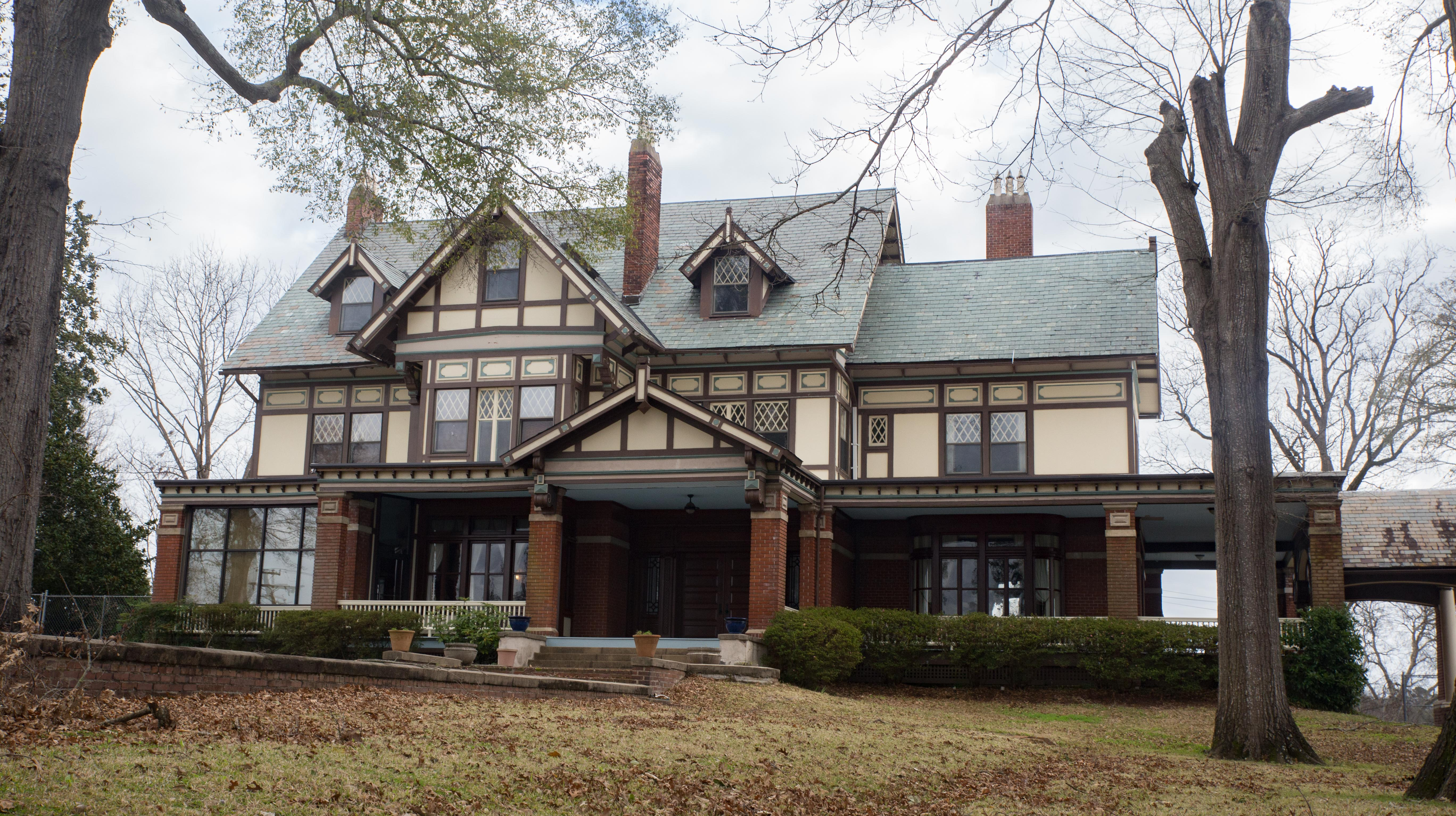
Craig–Flowers House, Vicksburg

- Carr Junior High School (built 1924), 1805 Cherry St.; NRHP-listed
- Craig–Flowers House (built 1904–1906; three buildings), 2011 Cherry St.; NRHP-listed
- Feld Home (built c. 1913; two buildings), 2108 Cherry St.; NRHP-listed
- Shlenker House (built 1907; two buildings), 2212 Cherry St.; NRHP-listed
- Fannie–Willis Johnson Home (built 1910; two buildings), 2430 Drummond St.; NRHP-listed
- Fitz–Hugh Hall (built c. 1910; two buildings), 1322 Chambers St.; NRHP-listed
- Harding–Johnston House
- The Magnolias (built c. 1877 – c. 1880), 1617 Monroe St.; NRHP-listed

== See also ==
- National Register of Historic Places listings in Warren County, Mississippi
- Cherry Street Historic District (disambiguation)
