= Church of the Holy Trinity (Vicksburg, Mississippi) =

Historic church in Mississippi, United States

- U.S. National Register of Historic Places
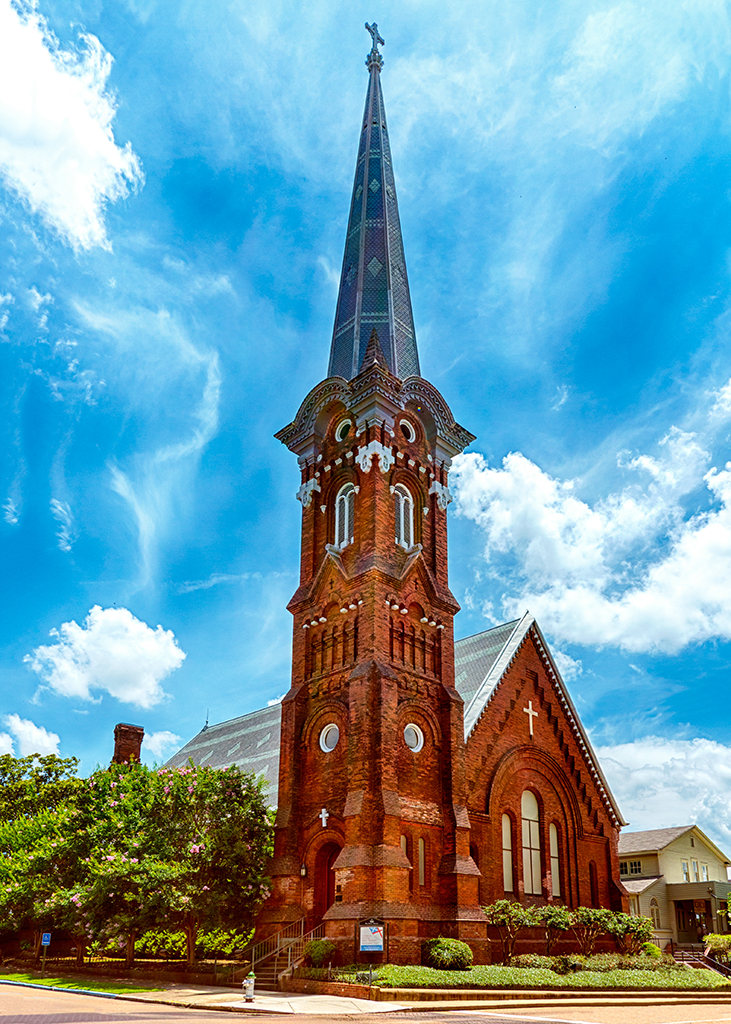

- Location within Mississippi Location within the United States
- Location: South and Monroe Sts., Vicksburg, Mississippi
- Coordinates: 32°20′50″N 90°52′47″W
- Area: 0.5 acres (0.20 ha)
- Built: 1870
- Architect: E.C. Jones
- Architectural style: Romanesque
- Website: churchoftheholytrinity.org
- NRHP reference No.: 78001633
- Added to NRHP: May 22, 1978

The Church of the Holy Trinity is a historic church building of the Episcopal Church, built in c. 1870 and located at South and Monroe Streets in Vicksburg, Mississippi.

It was designed by architect Edward Culliatt Jones and was constructed in 1870 in a Romanesque style. The building was added to the National Register of Historic Places in 1978, becoming part of the Uptown Vicksburg Historic District.
