= Magnolia Park Town Center =

Shopping center

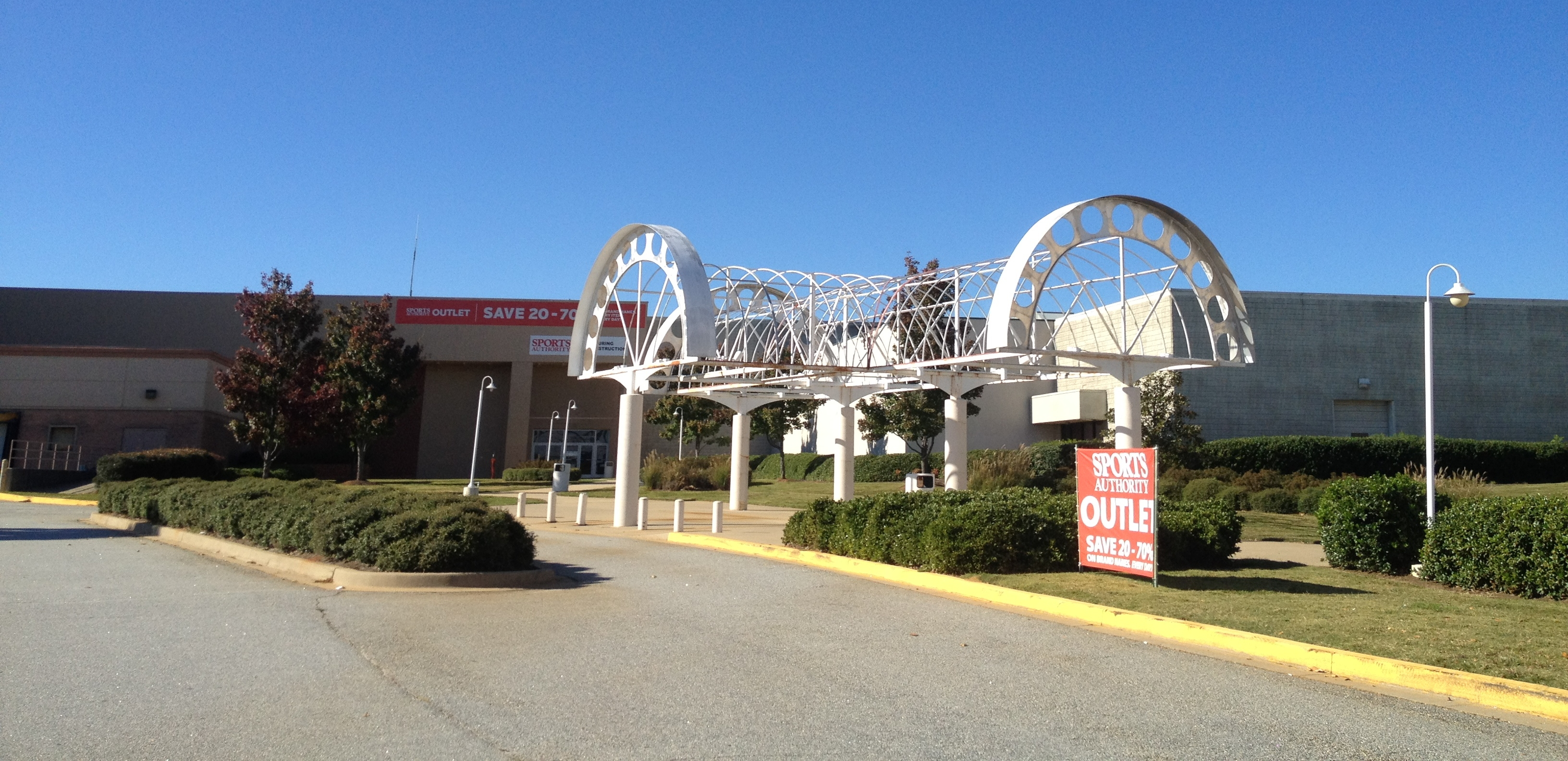
- Exterior view of Magnolia Park Town Center, October 2012
- Location: Greenville, South Carolina, United States
- Coordinates: 34.8351°N 82.3085°W
- Opened: 2009/2010
- Owner: First Hartford Realty (1974–?); SES Properties (?-1992); Intershop Real Estate Services (1992-?); DRA Advisors Inc; Gulfside Development Co (2005-2007); Menin Development (2007-2014); MetLife Core Property Fund (2014-Present)
- Floor area: 900,000 sq ft (84,000 m^{2})
- Website: magnoliapark.com

Magnolia Park Town Center is a shopping center in Greenville, South Carolina. Known originally as Greenville Mall, it was redeveloped extensively starting in 2009.

== History ==
The Magnolia Park Town Center was originally built as the Greenville Mall, in planning as early as 1974 when Montgomery Ward was secured as its first anchor. In 1976, J. B. White was secured as a second anchor, along with the mall as a whole being announced with a planned 78 stores. Ground was broken on August 10, 1976, in a ceremony attended by Neal Ellis, president of mall developer First Hartford Realty, Edward Hale, president of J. B. White, James Wickert, southeastern real estate director for Montgomery Ward, and senator Richard Riley. At this time, it was announced the mall would be a total of 700,000 sq ft, and cost $15 million to build, with an estimated opening date of August 3, 1978. Plans for a third anchor store and a 3–4 screen movie theater were also announced at this time, as well as many of the interior tenants. The mall opened as planned on August 3, 1978, with anchors J. B. White and Montgomery Ward, as well as 37 interior tenants, and a two screen Plitt Theatres, drawing an estimated crowd of 25,000.

In March 1994, J. B. White announced a major renovation, adding 40,000–50,000 sq ft in anticipation of a larger mall renovation, said to include a new anchor, Parisian. At this time, the mall, now owned by Intershop Real Estate Services, was more than 50% vacant, with only 25 open stores. Parisian, along with the construction of a new, two-story Montgomery Wards, were officially announced in May 1994, expected to open in May and March 1995, respectively. An expansion to the mall itself was announced in June 1994, to include a food court, a new theater (replacing the two-screen Cineplex Odeon theater which had closed in November 1991), and an additional wing, connecting to an unnamed fourth anchor. The expansion, planned to open in Spring 1995, would expand the mall to over 700,000 sq ft and include more upscale shops, fountains, interior landscaping, etched-glass skylights, and terracotta and green tile flooring to create "the look and beauty of Southern gardens".

Montgomery Ward held a grand opening for what it called a "concept store" on May 5, 1995 in a ceremony attended by Montgomery Ward officials and NASCAR driver Cale Yarborough, following a soft-open earlier that week. It was followed by Parisian, who opened their store on May 21, in a ceremony presided over by president and CEO Donald E. Hess. Oshman's SuperSports USA was announced in June 1995, taking up a portion of the original Montgomery Ward building and set to open in Fall 1995. The mall, following its 14-month, $65 million renovation, reopened on August 31, 1995 with 19 new shops and restaurants and anchors Parisian, J.B. White, and Montgomery Ward, with 16 additional shops, including Oshman's SuperSports USA scheduled to open October 20. Grand opening events held October 20–22 included a golf tournament inside Oshman's, a fashion show, kids events, an appearance by Miss South Carolina Amanda E. Spivey, and a performance by the Greenville Symphony Orchestra and Dixie Carter. Dillard's came to the mall in 1998 with its acquisition of J. B. White parent Mercantile Stores Company, Inc. Parisian converted to Proffitt's in February 1999.

The mall took a serious hit in 2000, when Montgomery Ward filed for Chapter 11 Bankruptcy, and closed all stores. Dillard's announced the closure of their location at the mall, which by this time had converted one of its floors to a Clearance Center, in January 2003. 2004 would see the closure of Proffitt's and relocation of Williams-Sonoma to the nearby Haywood Mall, leaving Oshman's SuperSports USA as the only remaining major tenant. By 2005, Oshman's had been converted to Sports Authority. The mall was sold to Canyon Gulfside Greenville LLC, a group of Gulfside Development Co. principals and other investors, in December 2005 from previous owners DRA Advisors Inc. While the company had not finalized its plans, one of the principals, Jackson Ward, told The Greenville News that "It will slowly be wound down and demolished, more than likely, or a portion of it will be demolished.". In 2005, The Shops at Greenridge, a large shopping center similar to the future Magnolia Park, opened next to the mall.

In April 2006, initial redevelopment plans were announced, with the mall being entirely demolished, save for the thriving Hollywood 20-screen theater, for new retail with tenants including Rooms To Go, Costco, and Sports Authority. The addition of offices and housing, to create a mixed use development, were discussed, but not confirmed at this time. In May, the redeveloped property was named Magnolia Park Town Center, and was to include a 250,000 sq ft company headquarters in addition to the previously announced tenants and 15-20 additional stores, with a planned opening date of Spring 2008. Demolition would begin in 2007, starting with the former Dillard's and eventually progressing to the former Proffitt's, as well as the attached mall structure. Costco would begin work around the same time, opening by 2008. However, the rest of the plans stalled due to the Great Recession, and Menin Development, the new owners of the partially-demolished mall, sat on the undeveloped property until plans picked back up in 2011.

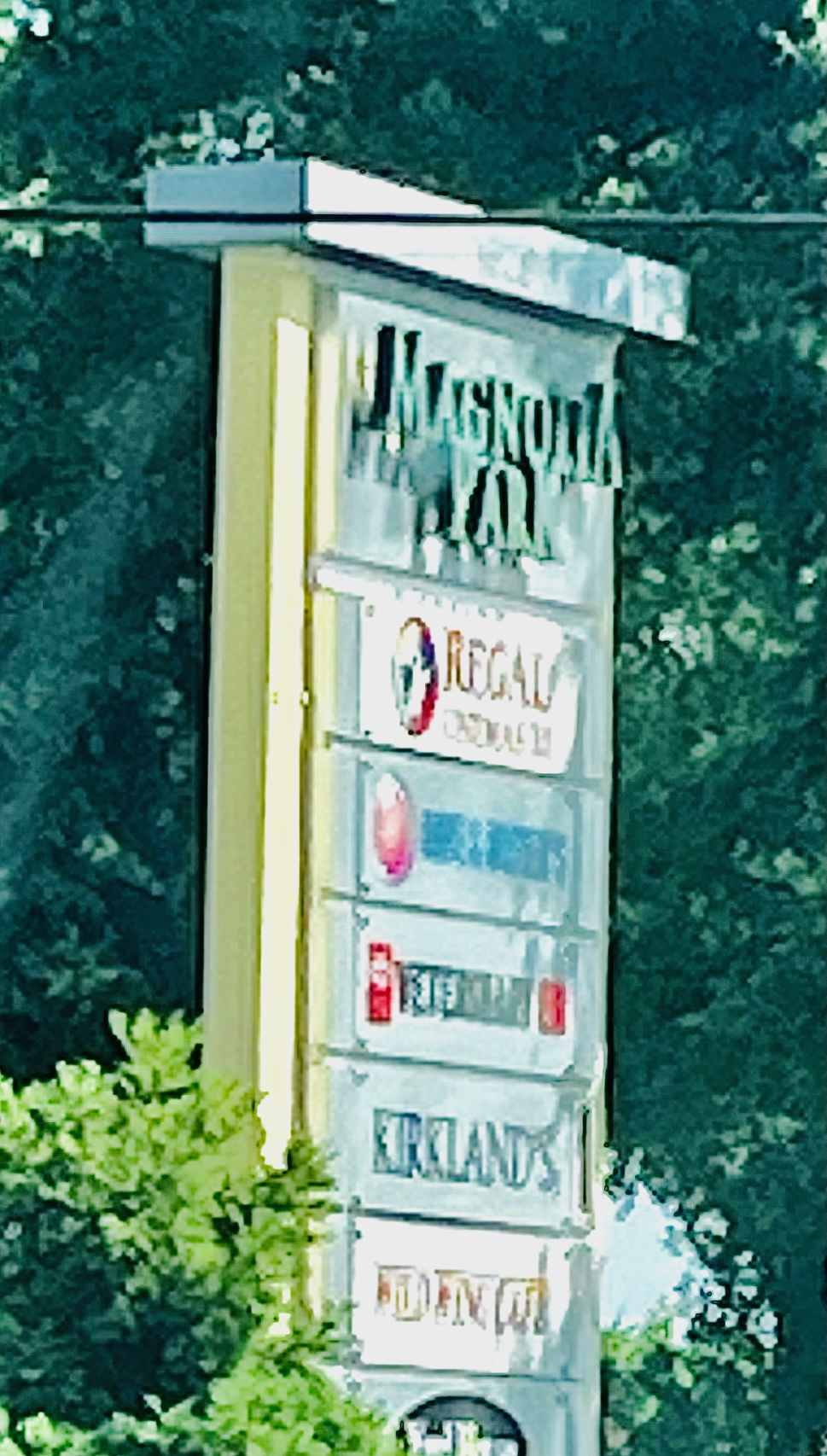
Sign of the new complex

In early 2013, outdoor retail chain Cabela's announced they would be opening a new store on the site. The center was sold by Menin Development to MetLife Core Property Fund in 2014, for more than $155 million. Dave & Buster's opened on November 17, 2014. As of August 2024, major tenants of the center include Golf Galaxy (formerly Golfsmith), Urban Air (formerly Toys "R" Us/Babies R Us), Nordstrom Rack, Bass Pro Shops, Regal Cinemas, and Dave & Buster's.
