= Magnolia Hotel =

Magnolia Hotel may refer to:

- Magnolia Hotel (Biloxi, Mississippi), listed on the NRHP in Harrison County, Mississippi
- Magnolia Hotel (Dallas, Texas), NRHP-listed
- Magnolia Hotel (Denver, Colorado), NRHP-listed
- Magnolia Hotel (Houston)
- Magnolia Hotel (Omaha)
- Magnolia Hotel (Seguin, Texas)

== See also ==
- Magnolia Hall (disambiguation)
