= Magnolia Hill =

Magnolia Hill may refer to:

- Magnolia, Seattle, a neighborhood in Seattle, Washington
- Magnolia Hill (Natchez, Mississippi), listed on the NRHP in Adams County, Mississippi

== See also ==
- Magnolia Grove (disambiguation)
