= Magnolia Cemetery =

Magnolia Cemetery is the name of at least 15 cemeteries in the United States:

- Magnolia Cemetery (Mobile, Alabama), listed on the NRHP in Alabama, also known as Magnolia Cemetery including Mobile National Cemetery
- Magnolia Cemetery (DeFuniak Springs, Florida)
- Magnolia Cemetery (Augusta, Georgia)
- Magnolia Cemetery (Baton Rouge, Louisiana), listed on the NRHP in Louisiana
- Magnolia Cemetery (Philadelphia, Pennsylvania)
- Magnolia Cemetery (Charleston, South Carolina), listed on the NRHP in South Carolina
- Magnolia Cemetery (Greenwood, South Carolina), listed on the NRHP in South Carolina
- Magnolia Cemetery (Hartsville, South Carolina), listed on the NRHP in South Carolina
