= Magnolia Thunderpussy =

American burlesque performer

Magnolia Thunderpussy (30 October 1939 – 15 May 1996), born Patricia Donna Mallon, was a San Francisco burlesque performer, radio personality, filmmaker and restaurateur. Thunderpussy operated two San Francisco restaurants in the 1960s: the one at 1398 Haight Street (at the corner of Haight and Masonic), which bore her name, featured a late-night delivery service and erotic desserts such as "The Montana Banana", which was an unsplit banana, representing a phallus, served "erect" in a food service "boat" with two scoops of ice cream, representing the other components of male genitalia, with shredded coconut, representing pubic hair, and a small dollop of whipped cream at the end of the banana. She created a host of other such delectables that, at the time, seemed incredibly scandalous.

San Francisco columnist Herb Caen was an ardent fan of "Magnolia" and wrote about her often in his daily column for the San Francisco Chronicle. She was also very much appreciated by a legion of rock musicians and bands who came to San Francisco to record at Wally Heider's studio. Her catering operation would deliver her signature food items to any location in San Francisco at any hour of the night or early morning, which was hugely popular with the bands and their followers. She was also a big hit with the local "Cannabis Culture".

Loved for her razor sharp wit, sense of daring and flamboyant imagination, she carved for herself a reputation of fun and free-spirit at a time in the Bay Area when all things seemed possible. She was a third generation San Franciscan who could trace her San Francisco roots back to before the earthquake of 1906.

Friends and employees would often be given "Thunderpussy" names befitting some aspect of their personality or appearance.

Her younger brother, Jimmy Mallon, also known as "Kid Thunderpussy", was instrumental, albeit in a behind-the-scene capacity, with much of the logistical operation of her food service enterprises.

Since 1997, publican David McLean has operated the Magnolia Pub and Brewery at the corner of Haight and Masonic. In addition to naming the pub in honor of Magnolia, he annually brews a barley wine named Old Thunderpussy.

In the mid-1980s, a mixed-influence rock band in Los Angeles took the name Magnolia Thunderpussy. They disbanded in 1986, but reformed in the mid-2000s.

In 1971, entrepreneurs Chuck Kubat and his partner Gary Lazar opened a record store in Columbus, Ohio, near the Ohio State University campus named Magnolia Thunderpussy, following the success of their similarly named store in East Lansing near Michigan State University. Although the E. Lansing store closed after a few years, the Columbus store has changed its location over the years but is still in business and now offers online sales.

In 1970, Arizona rockclimbers named a route in the Granite Mountain Wilderness (located in Prescott, Arizona) Magnolia Thunderpussy. Rated a 5.8 on the Yosemite Decimal System, it has a reputation for being difficult for the grade.
