= Magnolia Grove =

Magnolia Grove may refer to:

- Magnolia Grove (Dayton, Alabama), plantation house and historic district, also known as the William Poole House
- Magnolia Grove (Greensboro, Alabama), historic mansion
- Magnolia Grove (Iron Station, North Carolina), listed on the NRHP in Lincoln County, North Carolina
- Magnolia Grove, Houston, neighborhood in Houston, Texas
- Magnolia Grove Monastery, Buddhist monastery Batesville, Mississippi
