= Magnolia Hall =

Magnolia Hall may refer to the following buildings in the United States:

- Magnolia Hall (Greensboro, Alabama)
- Magnolia Hall (Natchez, Mississippi)
- Magnolia Hall (Hagood, South Carolina)
- William S. Campbell House, also known as Magnolia Hall, in Franklin, Tennessee

== See also ==
- Magnolia Hotel (disambiguation)
