= List of Mimetidae species =

This page lists all described species of the spider family Mimetidae accepted by the World Spider Catalog as of January 2021:

== Anansi ==
Anansi Benavides & Hormiga, 2017

- A. insidiator (Thorell, 1899) — Cameroon, Central African Republic, Equatorial Guinea, Gabon
- A. luki Benavides & Hormiga, 2017 (type) — DR Congo, Gabon
- A. natalensis (Lawrence, 1938) — South Africa

== Arocha ==
Arocha Simon, 1893

- A. erythrophthalma Simon, 1893 (type) — Peru, Brazil
- A. rochai Mello-Leitão, 1941 — Brazil

== Australomimetus ==
Australomimetus Heimer, 1986

- A. annulipes Heimer, 1986 — Australia (Lord Howe Is.)
- A. audax (Hickman, 1929) — Australia (Victoria, Tasmania)
- A. aurioculatus (Hickman, 1929) — Southern Australia
- A. burnetti Heimer, 1986 — Australia (Queensland, New South Wales)
- A. catulli (Heimer, 1989) — Australia (Queensland)
- A. childersiensis Heimer, 1986 — Australia (Queensland)
- A. daviesianus Heimer, 1986 — Australia (Queensland)
- A. diabolicus Harms & Harvey, 2009 — Australia (Western Australia)
- A. djuka Harms & Harvey, 2009 — Australia (Western Australia)
- A. dunlopi Harms & Harvey, 2009 — Australia (Western Australia)
- A. hannemanni (Heimer, 1989) — Australia (Queensland)
- A. hartleyensis Heimer, 1986 — Australia (Queensland)
- A. hertelianus Heimer, 1986 — Australia (Queensland)
- A. hirsutus Heimer, 1986 — Australia (Queensland)
- A. japonicus (Uyemura, 1938) — Korea, Japan
- A. kioloensis Heimer, 1986 — Australia (New South Wales)
- A. maculosus (Rainbow, 1904) (type) — Australia (Queensland to Tasmania), New Zealand
- A. mendax Harms & Harvey, 2009 — Australia (Tasmania)
- A. mendicus (O. Pickard-Cambridge, 1880) — New Zealand
- A. miniatus Heimer, 1986 — Australia (Queensland)
- A. nasoi Harms & Harvey, 2009 — Australia (Western Australia)
- A. pseudomaculosus Heimer, 1986 — Australia (Queensland, New South Wales)
- A. raveni Heimer, 1986 — Australia (Queensland)
- A. robustus Heimer, 1986 — Australia (Queensland)
- A. sennio (Urquhart, 1891) — New Zealand
- A. spinosus Heimer, 1986 — Australia (Western Australia, Queensland)
- A. stephanieae Harms & Harvey, 2009 — Australia (Western Australia)
- A. subspinosus Heimer, 1986 — Australia (New South Wales)
- A. sydneyensis Heimer, 1986 — Australia (New South Wales)
- A. tasmaniensis (Hickman, 1929) — Australia
- A. triangulosus Heimer, 1986 — Australia (Queensland)

== Ero ==
Ero C. L. Koch, 1836

- E. aphana (Walckenaer, 1802) — Europe, Macaronesia, North Africa, Turkey, Caucasus, Russia (Europe to Central Asia), Kazakhstan, Iran. Introduced to St. Helena, Réunion, Japan (Ryukyu Is.), China, Philippines, Australia (Queensland, Western Australia)
- E. cachinnans Brignoli, 1978 — Bhutan
- E. cambridgei Kulczyński, 1911 — Canary Is., Europe, Russia (Europe to Far East), Korea, Japan
- E. canala Wang, 1990 — China
- E. canionis Chamberlin & Ivie, 1935 — USA
- E. capensis Simon, 1895 — South Africa
- E. catharinae Keyserling, 1886 — Brazil
- E. comorensis Emerit, 1996 — Comoros, Seychelles
- E. eburnea Thaler, 2004 — Ivory Coast
- E. felix Thaler & van Harten, 2004 — Yemen
- E. flammeola Simon, 1881 — Canary Is., Portugal to Greece (Corfu), Ukraine, Russia (Caucasus), Turkey, Israel
- E. furcata (Villers, 1789) — Europe, Turkey, Caucasus, Russia (Europe to Far East), Turkmenistan, Japan
- E. furuncula Simon, 1909 — Vietnam
- E. galea Wang, 1990 — China
- E. ganglia Yin & Bao, 2012 — China
- E. gemelosi Baert & Maelfait, 1984 — Ecuador (Galapagos Is.)
- E. goeldii Keyserling, 1891 — Brazil
- E. gracilis Keyserling, 1891 — Brazil
- E. humilithorax Keyserling, 1886 — Brazil
- E. japonica Bösenberg & Strand, 1906 — Russia (Far East), China, Korea, Japan
- E. jiafui Yin & Bao, 2012 — China
- E. juhuaensis Xu, Wang & Wang, 1987 — China
- E. kompirensis Strand, 1918 — Japan
- E. koreana Paik, 1967 — Ukraine, Russia (Europe to Far East), Kazakhstan, Mongolia, China, Korea, Japan
- E. laeta Barrientos, 2017 — Portugal, Spain
- E. lata Keyserling, 1891 — Brazil
- E. lawrencei Unzicker, 1966 — South Africa
- E. leonina (Hentz, 1850) — USA
- E. lodingi Archer, 1941 — USA
- E. lokobeana Emerit, 1996 — Madagascar
- E. madagascariensis Emerit, 1996 — Madagascar
- E. melanostoma Mello-Leitão, 1929 — Brazil
- E. pensacolae Ivie & Barrows, 1935 — USA
- E. quadrituberculata Kulczyński, 1905 — Madeira
- E. salittana Barrion & Litsinger, 1995 — Philippines
- E. septemspinosa Lissner, 2016 — Spain (Majorca)
- E. spinifrons Mello-Leitão, 1929 — Brazil
- E. spinipes (Nicolet, 1849) — Chile, Argentina
- E. tenebrosa Lissner, 2018 — Canary Is.
- E. tuberculata (De Geer, 1778) (type) — Europe, Russia (Europe to Central Asia), Iran, Central Asia, China
- E. valida Keyserling, 1891 — Brazil
- † E. longitarsus Wunderlich, 2004
- † E. clunis Wunderlich, 2012
- † E. gracilitibialis Wunderlich, 2012
- † E. veta Wunderlich, 2012
- † E. carboneana Petrunkevitch, 1942
- † E. permunda Petrunkevitch, 1942
- † E. rovnoensis Wunderlich, 2004
- † E. sphaerica Koch and Berendt, 1854

== Gelanor ==
Gelanor Thorell, 1869

- G. altithorax Keyserling, 1893 — Brazil, Argentina
- G. cachimbo Rodrigues, Buckup & Brescovit, 2016 — Brazil
- G. consequus O. Pickard-Cambridge, 1902 — Mexico, Costa Rica to Bolivia
- G. fortuna Benavides & Hormiga, 2016 — Panama
- G. hoga Rodrigues, Buckup & Brescovit, 2016 — Brazil
- G. innominatus Chamberlin, 1916 — Peru
- G. juruti Benavides & Hormiga, 2016 — Venezuela, Guyana, Brazil
- G. latus (Keyserling, 1881) — Mexico, Guatemala, Nicaragua to Bolivia
- G. moyobamba Benavides & Hormiga, 2016 — Peru
- G. muliebris Dyal, 1935 — Pakistan
- G. siquirres Benavides & Hormiga, 2016 — Costa Rica
- G. waorani Benavides & Hormiga, 2016 — Colombia, Ecuador, Brazil
- G. zonatus (C. L. Koch, 1845) (type) — Mexico to Uruguay

== Kratochvilia ==
Kratochvilia Strand, 1934

- K. pulvinata (Simon, 1907) (type) — São Tomé and Príncipe

== Melaenosia ==
Melaenosia Simon, 1906

- M. pustulifera Simon, 1906 (type) — India

== Mimetus ==
Mimetus Hentz, 1832

- M. aktius Chamberlin & Ivie, 1935 — USA
- M. arushae Caporiacco, 1947 — Tanzania
- M. banksi Chickering, 1947 — Panama
- M. bifurcatus Reimoser, 1939 — Costa Rica
- M. bigibbosus O. Pickard-Cambridge, 1894 — Mexico, Panama
- M. bishopi Caporiacco, 1949 — Kenya
- M. brasilianus Keyserling, 1886 — Brazil
- M. bucerus Gan, Mi, Irfan, Peng, Ran & Zhan, 2019 — China
- M. caudatus Wang, 1990 — China
- M. comorensis Schmidt & Krause, 1994 — Comoros
- M. contrarius (Zeng, Irfan & Peng, 2019) — China
- M. cornutus Lawrence, 1947 — South Africa
- M. crudelis O. Pickard-Cambridge, 1899 — Guatemala
- M. debilispinis Mello-Leitão, 1943 — Brazil
- M. dimissus Petrunkevitch, 1930 — Puerto Rico, Antigua
- M. echinatus Wang, 1990 — China
- M. epeiroides Emerton, 1882 — USA
- M. eutypus Chamberlin & Ivie, 1935 — USA
- M. fernandi Lessert, 1930 — Congo
- M. haynesi Gertsch & Mulaik, 1940 — USA
- M. hesperus Chamberlin, 1923 — USA
- M. hieroglyphicus Mello-Leitão, 1929 — Brazil, Paraguay
- M. hirsutus O. Pickard-Cambridge, 1899 — Mexico
- M. hispaniolae Bryant, 1948 — Hispaniola
- M. indicus Simon, 1906 — India
- M. investis (Simon, 1909) — Vietnam
- M. keyserlingi Mello-Leitão, 1929 — Peru, Brazil
- M. labiatus Wang, 1990 — China
- M. laevigatus (Keyserling, 1863) — Mediterranean to Central Asia
- M. lamellaris Zeng, Wang & Peng, 2016 — China
- M. latro (Brignoli, 1979) — Kenya
- M. lingbaoshanensis Gan, Mi, Irfan, Peng, Ran & Zhan, 2019 — China
- M. madacassus Emerit, 1996 — Madagascar
- M. margaritifer Simon, 1901 — Malaysia
- M. marjorieae Barrion & Litsinger, 1995 — Philippines
- M. melanoleucus Mello-Leitão, 1929 — Brazil
- M. nelsoni Archer, 1950 — USA
- M. notius Chamberlin, 1923 — USA
- M. penicillatus Mello-Leitão, 1929 — Brazil
- M. portoricensis Petrunkevitch, 1930 — Puerto Rico
- M. puritanus Chamberlin, 1923 — USA
- M. rapax O. Pickard-Cambridge, 1899 — Costa Rica, Panama
- M. ridens Brignoli, 1975 — Philippines
- M. rusticus Chickering, 1947 — Panama
- M. ryukyus Yoshida, 1993 — Taiwan, Japan (Ryukyu Is.)
- M. saetosus Chickering, 1956 — Panama
- M. sagittifer (Simon, 1895) — Sri Lanka
- M. sinicus Song & Zhu, 1993 — China
- M. strinatii Brignoli, 1972 — Sri Lanka
- M. syllepsicus Hentz, 1832 (type) — USA, Mexico
  - M. s. molestus Chickering, 1937 — Mexico
- M. testaceus Yaginuma, 1960 — Russia (Far East), China, Korea, Japan
- M. tikaderi Gajbe, 1992 — India
- M. tillandsiae Archer, 1941 — USA
- M. triangularis (Keyserling, 1879) — Peru, Brazil
- M. trituberculatus O. Pickard-Cambridge, 1899 — Panama
- M. tuberculatus Liang & Wang, 1991 — China
- M. variegatus Chickering, 1956 — Panama
- M. verecundus Chickering, 1947 — Panama
- M. vespillo Brignoli, 1980 — Indonesia (Sulawesi)
- M. wangi Zeng, Wang & Peng, 2016 — China
- M. yinae Gan, Mi, Irfan, Peng, Ran & Zhan, 2019 — China
- † M. bituberculatus Wunderlich, 1988
- † M. brevipes Wunderlich, 2004
- † M. longipes Wunderlich, 2004

== † Protomimetus ==
† Protomimetus Wunderlich, 2011

- † P. breviclypeus Wunderlich, 2011
- † P. longiclypeus Wunderlich, 2011
