= Ermetus =

Scientific classification
- Domain: Eukaryota
- Kingdom: Animalia
- Phylum: Arthropoda
- Subphylum: Chelicerata
- Class: Arachnida
- Order: Araneae
- Infraorder: Araneomorphae
- Family: Mimetidae
- Genus: Ermetus
- Species: E. inopinabilis

Binomial name
- Ermetus inopinabilis Ponomarev, 2008

Genus of arachnids

Ermetus is a genus of spiders in the family Mimetidae. It was first described in 2008 by Ponomarev. As of 2017, it contains only one species, Ermetus inopinabilis, found in Borneo.
