= M. cornutus =

M. cornutus may refer to:

- Mantidactylus cornutus, a frog species
- Mecolaesthus cornutus, a house spider species in the genus Mecolaesthus
- Metopoceros cornutus, an iguana species in the genus Metopoceros
- Mimetus cornutus, a pirate spider species in the genus Memetus
- Modisimus cornutus, a vibrating spider species in the genus Modisimus
- Mughiphantes cornutus, a money spider species in the genus Mughiphantes

== See also ==
- Cornutus (disambiguation)
