= Anansi natalensis =

Scientific classification
- Kingdom: Animalia
- Phylum: Arthropoda
- Subphylum: Chelicerata
- Class: Arachnida
- Order: Araneae
- Infraorder: Araneomorphae
- Family: Mimetidae
- Genus: Anansi
- Species: A. natalensis

Binomial name
- Anansi natalensis (Lawrence, 1938)

Synonyms
- Mimetus natalensis Lawrence, 1938

Species of spider

Anansi natalensis, commonly known as the Anansi pirate spider, is a species of pirate spider in the family Mimetidae. It is endemic to South Africa.

== Description ==
A. natalensis is known from both sexes.

== Distribution and habitat ==
Anansi natalensis is a South African endemic with a wide distribution across seven provinces. It has been recorded from the Eastern Cape, Free State, KwaZulu-Natal, Limpopo, Mpumalanga, Northern Cape, and Western Cape provinces, at elevations ranging from 5 to 1,732 m above sea level. The species occupies all biomes in South Africa except the Desert and Succulent Karoo biomes.

The spider is commonly found in agricultural areas including avocado orchards, citrus groves, cotton fields, and pine plantations, where it preys on other spiders. It has also been recorded from numerous protected areas.

== Behavior ==
Anansi natalensis is a free-living, arboreal spider that specializes in preying on other spiders. It is typically found on vegetation where adequate prey is available.

== Taxonomy ==
The species was first described by R. F. Lawrence in 1938 as Mimetus natalensis from specimens collected in Pietermaritzburg, KwaZulu-Natal. In 2017, Benavides, Giribet and Hormiga transferred it to the newly erected genus Anansi based on molecular phylogenetic analysis and morphological characteristics that distinguished it from true Mimetus species.

== Conservation status ==
The species is assessed as Least Concern in South Africa due to its wide geographical range, ability to utilize agricultural areas, and presence in at least ten protected areas. No significant threats have been identified.
