= Anansi insidiator =

Scientific classification
- Kingdom: Animalia
- Phylum: Arthropoda
- Subphylum: Chelicerata
- Class: Arachnida
- Order: Araneae
- Infraorder: Araneomorphae
- Family: Mimetidae
- Genus: Anansi
- Species: A. insidiator

Binomial name
- Anansi insidiator (Thorell, 1899)

Synonyms
- Mimetus insidiator Thorell, 1899

Species of spider

Anansi insidiator is a species of pirate spider in the family Mimetidae. It is found in Central Africa, including Cameroon, Central African Republic, Equatorial Guinea, and Gabon.

== Taxonomy ==
The species was first described by Tamerlan Thorell in 1899 as Mimetus insidiator based on a single female specimen from Cameroon collected by Yngve Sjöstedt. Eugène Simon described the male in 1903 from specimens from Spanish Guinea (now Equatorial Guinea).

In 2017, Benavides, Giribet and Hormiga transferred the species to the newly erected genus Anansi based on molecular phylogenetic analysis and morphological characteristics that distinguished it from true Mimetus species.

== Description ==
Males measure 5.37 mm in total length, with a cephalothorax 2.48 mm long and opisthosoma 2.74 mm long. Females are slightly smaller at 4.77 mm total length, with a cephalothorax 3.04 mm long and abdomen 2.60 mm long. The carapace is pale yellow with two lines of macrosetae running from the fovea to the ocular area, and features a distinctive dark brown stripe running longitudinally that widens from the fovea to the anterior carapace margin.

Anansi insidiator shares the genus characteristics of four dorsal abdominal humps with macrosetae at their tips and chelicerae that are approximately 2.1 times longer than the clypeus width. It can be distinguished from other Anansi species by its short cymbio-ectal process, a conductor flagellum that is as long as the maximum cymbium width (compared to 1.5 times in A. luki), and a piriform epigyne with a wider base.

In females, the epigyne projects posteriorly and is twice as long as wide, with the distal end entire and folding downwards, distinguishing it from A. luki where the distal end is bifid and folds upwards. The copulatory openings face posteriorly, and the spermathecae are oval-shaped with copulatory ducts as long as the spermathecae.

== Distribution and habitat ==
The species has a wide distribution across Central Africa. It has been recorded from Cameroon (Southwest, Central, and Fako provinces, including Mount Cameroon and Ototomo Forest), Central African Republic (Dzanga-Ndoki National Park), Equatorial Guinea (Bioko Island) and Gabon (Ogooué Maritime and Ogooué-Ivindo provinces).

Specimens have been collected from various forest types including primary rainforest, mist forest, and swampy forest, at elevations ranging from 360 to 1,425 meters. The species is typically found on vegetation, obtained through beating foliage and tree trunks.
