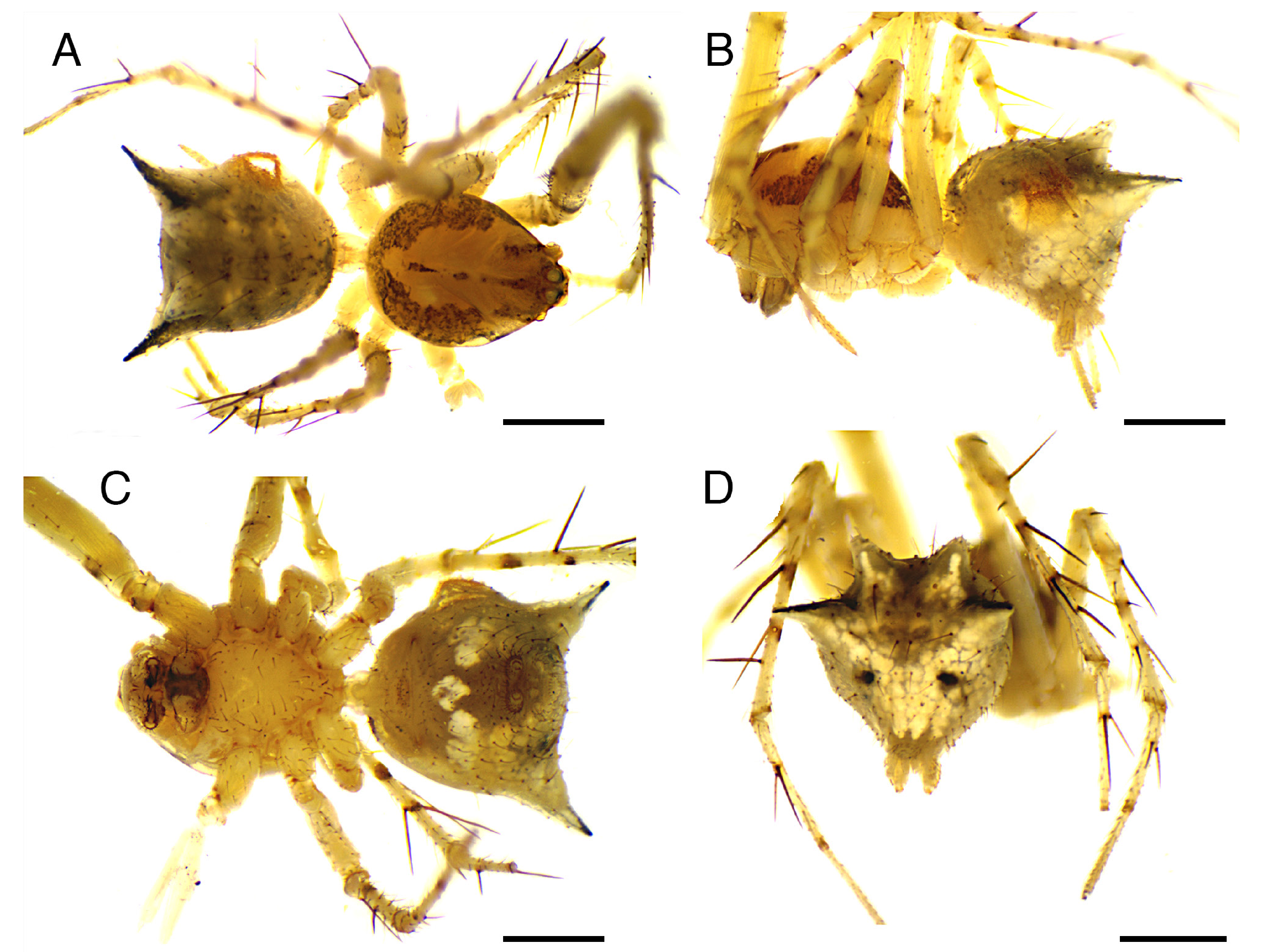

Scientific classification
- Kingdom: Animalia
- Phylum: Arthropoda
- Subphylum: Chelicerata
- Class: Arachnida
- Order: Araneae
- Infraorder: Araneomorphae
- Family: Mimetidae
- Genus: Ero
- Species: E. lizae

Binomial name
- Ero lizae Sherwood et al., 2024

= Ero lizae =

Species of pirate spider

Ero lizae is a pirate spider endemic to the cloud forests of Saint Helena, a remote South Atlantic island. It is notable for preying on other spiders as well as for its unique physical traits, such as spike-like structures on its body.

This discovery highlights the island's rich yet threatened biodiversity of Saint Helena.
