= Mimetus eutypus =

Scientific classification
- Kingdom: Animalia
- Phylum: Arthropoda
- Subphylum: Chelicerata
- Class: Arachnida
- Order: Araneae
- Infraorder: Araneomorphae
- Family: Mimetidae
- Genus: Mimetus
- Species: M. eutypus

Binomial name
- Mimetus eutypus Chamberlin and Ivie, 1935

Synonyms
- Reo eutypus (Chamberlin and Ivie, 1935)

Species of spider

Mimetus eutypus, synonym Reo eutypus, is a spider in the family Mimetidae ("pirate spiders"), in the infraorder Araneomorphae ("true spiders"). It is found in the United States.
