= Mimetus bifurcatus =

Scientific classification
- Kingdom: Animalia
- Phylum: Arthropoda
- Subphylum: Chelicerata
- Class: Arachnida
- Order: Araneae
- Infraorder: Araneomorphae
- Family: Mimetidae
- Genus: Mimetus
- Species: M. bifurcatus

Binomial name
- Mimetus bifurcatus Reimoser, 1939

Species of spider

Mimetus bifurcatus is a species of Araneomorphae spider in the family of Mimetidae.

== Distribution ==
This species is endemic to Costa Rica.

== Original publications ==
- Reimoser, 1939 : Wissenschaftliche Ergebnisse der österreichischen biologischen Expedition nach Costa Rica. Die Spinnenfauna. Annalen des Naturhistorischen Museums in Wien, vol. 50, p. 328–386
