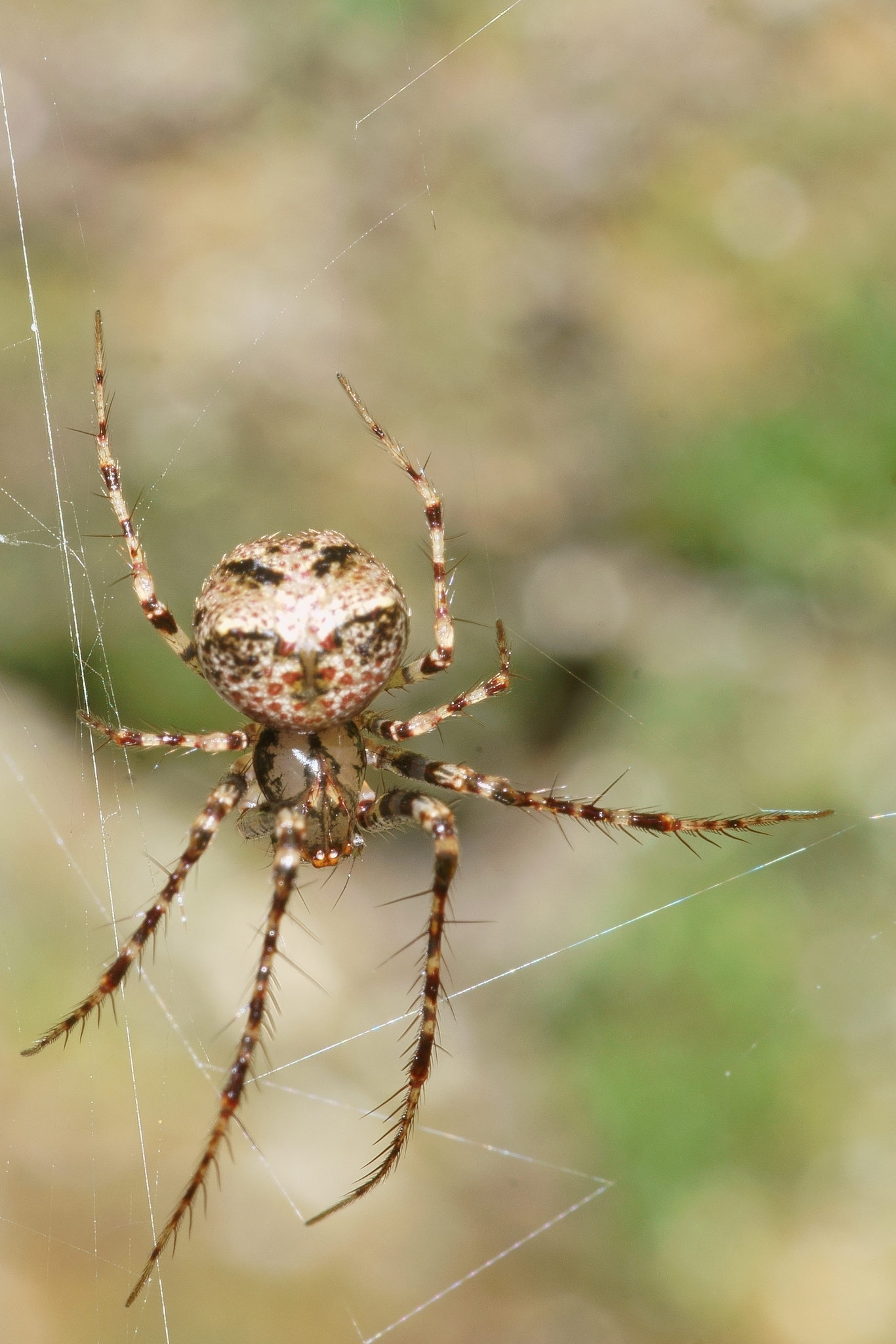

Conservation status
- Not Threatened (NZ TCS)

Scientific classification
- Domain: Eukaryota
- Kingdom: Animalia
- Phylum: Arthropoda
- Subphylum: Chelicerata
- Class: Arachnida
- Order: Araneae
- Infraorder: Araneomorphae
- Family: Mimetidae
- Genus: Australomimetus
- Species: A. sennio

Binomial name
- Australomimetus sennio (Urquhart, 1891)

Synonyms
- Linyphia sennio Mimetus senio

= Australomimetus sennio =

Species of spider

Australomimetus sennio is a species of Mimetidae that is endemic to New Zealand.

== Taxonomy ==
This species was described as Linyphia sennio in 1891 by Arthur Urquhart from the Taranaki region.It was most recently transferred to the Australomimetus in 2009.

== Description ==
This species is around 4mm long. The cephalothorax is brownish orange with black markings dorsally. The legs are orangish brown with black bands. The abdomen is mottled with white, creamy and brownish colours.

== Distribution ==
This species is known from throughout New Zealand.

== Conservation status ==
Under the New Zealand Threat Classification System, this species is listed as "Not Threatened".
