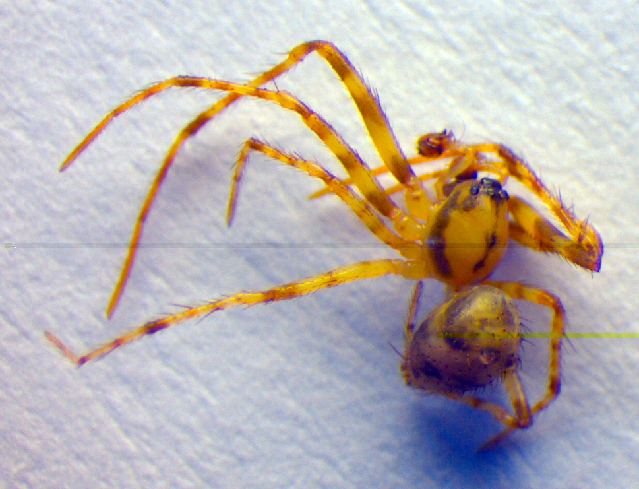
- Ero cambridgei, adult male
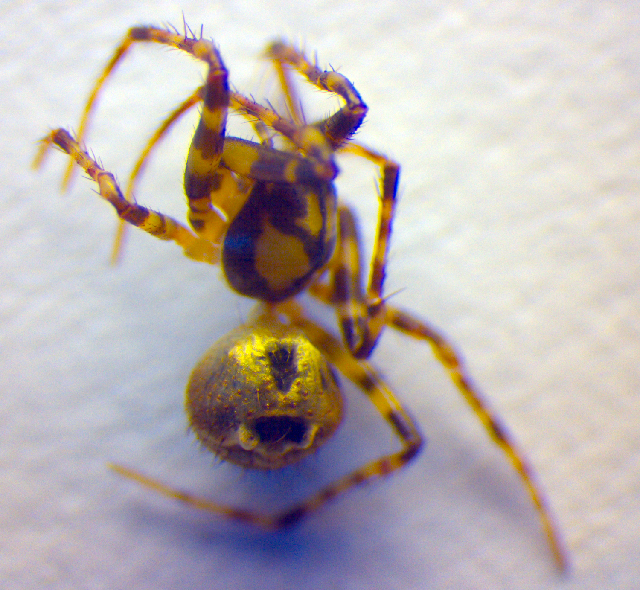
- Ero cambridgei, adult female

Scientific classification
- Kingdom: Animalia
- Phylum: Arthropoda
- Subphylum: Chelicerata
- Class: Arachnida
- Order: Araneae
- Infraorder: Araneomorphae
- Family: Mimetidae
- Genus: Ero
- Species: E. cambridgei

Binomial name
- Ero cambridgei Kulczyński, 1911

= Ero cambridgei =

Species of spider

Ero cambridgei is a pirate spider species with Palearctic distribution. It is notably found in Lithuania.

== Description ==
Adult males have a body length of 2.5–3.0 mm (0.098–0.118 in), females 2.5–3.5 mm (0.098–0.138 in). The carapace is pale brown, with a dark brown to black ocular region. It bears a dark brown median line, which usually widens at the junction between the head and thoracic area, as well as dark brown marginal lines which vary in width. It has a distinctive central dome, and strong spines are usually present towards the head area. The abdomen is globular in shape, with downward facing spinnerets and a pair of flattish tubules on the dorsal side. It is creamy brown to orange in colour, and mottled with black, especially towards the anterior. The legs are pale brown, with clear dark annulations. The metatarsi of the front two pairs of legs are curved and, along with the tarsi, bear strong spines. The front two pairs of legs are distinctly longer than the rear two. They have eight eyes, with the median eyes forming a rough square and the lateral eyes being clustered to either side.

== Habitat ==
They are found on bushes, trees and low vegetation in a variety of habitats, especially in areas where other spiders, their main prey, are found.
