= Gelanor fortuna =

Scientific classification
- Domain: Eukaryota
- Kingdom: Animalia
- Phylum: Arthropoda
- Subphylum: Chelicerata
- Class: Arachnida
- Order: Araneae
- Infraorder: Araneomorphae
- Family: Mimetidae
- Genus: Gelanor
- Species: G. fortuna

Binomial name
- Gelanor fortuna Benavides & Hormiga, 2016

Species of spider

Gelanor fortuna is a species of neotropical spider from Panama in the family Mimetidae.
