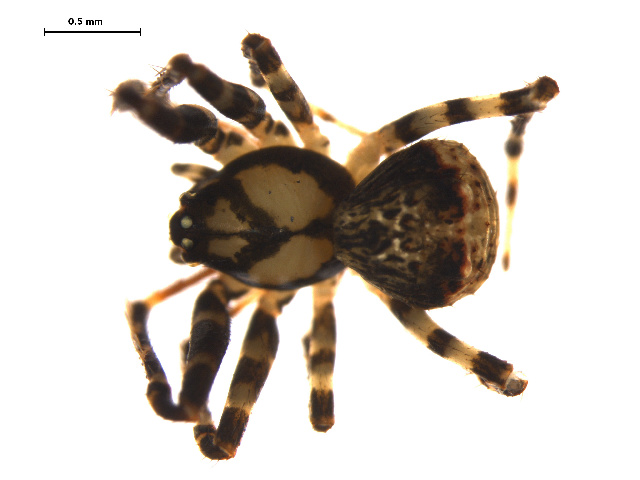
- E. canionis, adult female

Scientific classification
- Kingdom: Animalia
- Phylum: Arthropoda
- Subphylum: Chelicerata
- Class: Arachnida
- Order: Araneae
- Infraorder: Araneomorphae
- Family: Mimetidae
- Genus: Ero
- Species: E. canionis

Binomial name
- Ero canionis Chamberlin & Ivie, 1935

= Ero canionis =

Species of spider

Ero canionis is a species of pirate spider in the family Mimetidae. It is found in the United States.
