= Anansi (genus) =

Scientific classification
- Kingdom: Animalia
- Phylum: Arthropoda
- Subphylum: Chelicerata
- Class: Arachnida
- Order: Araneae
- Infraorder: Araneomorphae
- Family: Mimetidae
- Genus: Anansi; Benavides & Hormiga, 2017

Type species
- Anansi luki Benavides & Hormiga, 2017

Species
- Anansi insidiator (Thorell, 1899) – Cameroon, Central African Republic, Equatorial Guinea, Gabon; Anansi luki Benavides & Hormiga, 2017 – DR Congo, Gabon; Anansi natalensis (Lawrence, 1938) – South Africa

Genus of pirate spiders

Anansi is a genus of pirate spiders in the family Mimetidae, endemic to sub-Saharan Africa. The genus was first described in 2017 by Benavides and Hormiga, who separated these species from the genus Mimetus based on molecular phylogenetic analysis and distinctive morphological characteristics.

== Etymology ==
The genus is named after Anansi, a trickster god of Akan folklore. In these stories, Anansi takes the shape of a spider and is considered to be the keeper of stories and knowledge.

== Description ==
Members of Anansi are distinguished from other pirate spiders by several unique characteristics. They possess a distinctive piriform (pear-shaped) cephalothorax and chelicerae that are approximately twice as long as the clypeus width. The opisthosoma bears four distinctive dorsal humps, each carrying specialized thick bristles (macrosetae) at their tips. Males measure 5.34–6.68 mm in total length, while females are slightly smaller at 4.74–5.26 mm.

The carapace is light yellow with a dark medial longitudinal band that widens into a triangular shape from the fovea to the ocular area. The anterior median eyes are enlarged and positioned on a tubercle, with the lateral eyes closely positioned (juxtaposed). The legs are slender and yellowish with dark spots, bearing macrosetae.

Males possess distinctive reproductive structures including a conductor with a flagellum and a spoon-shaped paracymbium. The male pedipalpal patellae bear two dorsal macrosetae projecting toward the cymbium. Females have an epigyne that projects posteriorly, being either as long as wide (in A. natalensis) or twice as long as wide (in A. luki and A. insidiator).

== Distribution and habitat ==
The genus is distributed across sub-Saharan Africa, with species recorded from South Africa in the south to Cameroon, Central African Republic, and Equatorial Guinea in central Africa. They are typically found in forest habitats, from primary rainforest to secondary forest and forest edges.

== Behavior ==
Anansi represents the first documented case of maternal care within the family Mimetidae. Like other pirate spiders, they are specialized predators of other spiders.

== Species ==
As of September 2025, this genus contains three described species:

- Anansi insidiator (Thorell, 1899) – type species – Cameroon, Central African Republic, Equatorial Guinea, Gabon
- Anansi luki Benavides & Hormiga, 2017 – DR Congo, Gabon
- Anansi natalensis (Lawrence, 1938) – South Africa
