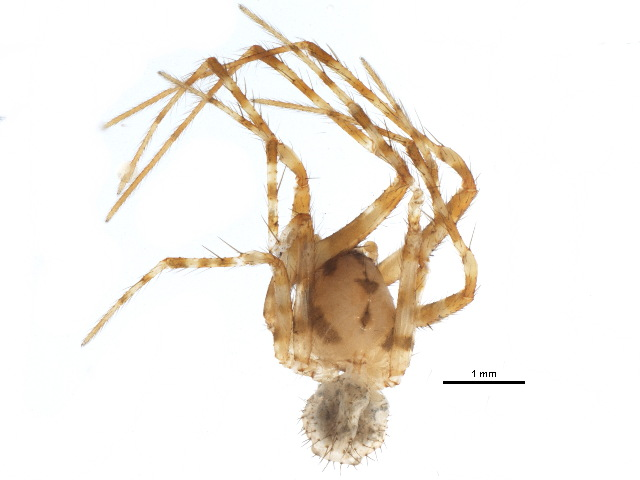
- E. leonina, adult male

Scientific classification
- Domain: Eukaryota
- Kingdom: Animalia
- Phylum: Arthropoda
- Subphylum: Chelicerata
- Class: Arachnida
- Order: Araneae
- Infraorder: Araneomorphae
- Family: Mimetidae
- Genus: Ero
- Species: E. leonina

Binomial name
- Ero leonina (Hentz, 1850)

= Ero leonina =

Species of spider

Ero leonina is a species of pirate spider in the family Mimetidae. It is found in the United States.
