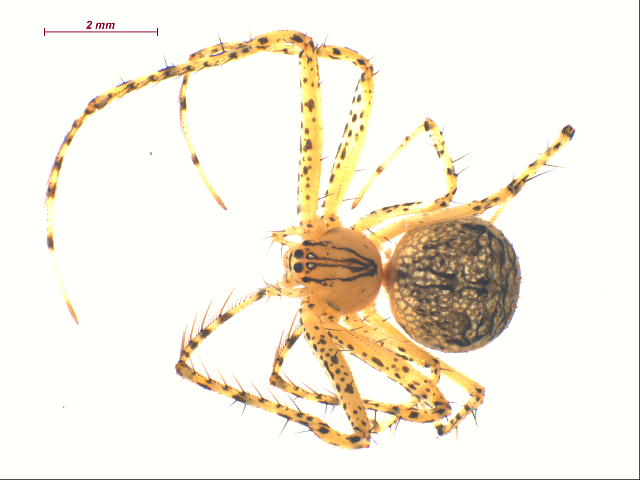
- M. hesperus, adult female

Scientific classification
- Kingdom: Animalia
- Phylum: Arthropoda
- Subphylum: Chelicerata
- Class: Arachnida
- Order: Araneae
- Infraorder: Araneomorphae
- Family: Mimetidae
- Genus: Mimetus
- Species: M. hesperus

Binomial name
- Mimetus hesperus Chamberlin, 1923

= Mimetus hesperus =

Species of spider

Mimetus hesperus is a species of pirate spider in the family Mimetidae. It is found in the United States.
