= Ero capensis =

Cape Ero Pirate Spider

Conservation status
- Least Concern (SANBI Red List)

Scientific classification
- Kingdom: Animalia
- Phylum: Arthropoda
- Subphylum: Chelicerata
- Class: Arachnida
- Order: Araneae
- Infraorder: Araneomorphae
- Family: Mimetidae
- Genus: Ero
- Species: E. capensis

Binomial name
- Ero capensis Simon, 1895

Species of spider

Ero capensis is a species of spider in the family Mimetidae. It is endemic to southern Africa and is commonly known as the Cape Ero pirate spider.

== Distribution ==
Ero capensis occurs in Eswatini and three provinces in South Africa, Eastern Cape, Northern Cape, and Western Cape. The species has been recorded at altitudes ranging from 7 to 957 m above sea level.

== Habitat and ecology ==
Ero capensis is a free-living spider found on vegetation that feeds on other spiders. The species has been sampled from the Fynbos, Grassland, and Albany Thicket biomes.

== Description ==
Ero capensis is known only from females. The species has a total length of 3.5 mm. The carapace is yellow-olive-brown with dark triangular markings. The abdomen is protruding with numerous setae, black-speckled and variegated. The chelicerae and other mouthparts are castaneous (chestnut-coloured). The legs are yellow with olive bands.

== Conservation ==
Ero capensis is listed as Least Concern by the South African National Biodiversity Institute due to its wide geographical range. The species is protected in Addo Elephant National Park, Fernkloof Nature Reserve, Table Mountain National Park, and Mkambati Nature Reserve.

== Taxonomy ==
The species was originally described by Eugène Simon in 1895, with the type locality given only as the Cape Peninsula. The species has not been revised and requires further taxonomic study.
