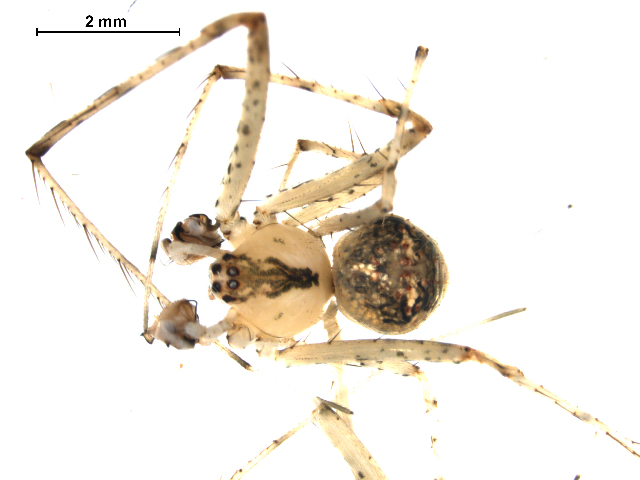
- M. puritanus, adult male
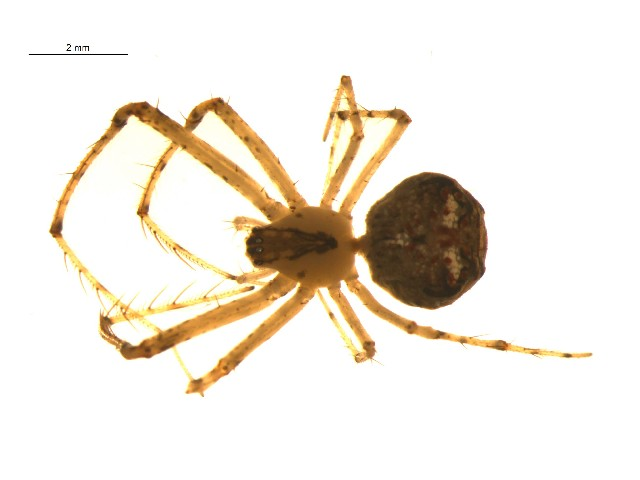
- M. puritanus, adult female

Scientific classification
- Kingdom: Animalia
- Phylum: Arthropoda
- Subphylum: Chelicerata
- Class: Arachnida
- Order: Araneae
- Infraorder: Araneomorphae
- Family: Mimetidae
- Genus: Mimetus
- Species: M. puritanus

Binomial name
- Mimetus puritanus Chamberlin, 1923

= Mimetus puritanus =

Species of spider

Mimetus puritanus is a species of the pirate spider in the family of Mimetidae. It is found in the United States and Canada.
