= Mimetus strinatii =

Scientific classification
- Kingdom: Animalia
- Phylum: Arthropoda
- Subphylum: Chelicerata
- Class: Arachnida
- Order: Araneae
- Infraorder: Araneomorphae
- Family: Mimetidae
- Genus: Mimetus
- Species: M. strinatii

Binomial name
- Mimetus strinatii Brignoli, 1972

Species of spider

Mimetus strinatii is a species of spider of the genus Mimetus. It is endemic to Sri Lanka.
