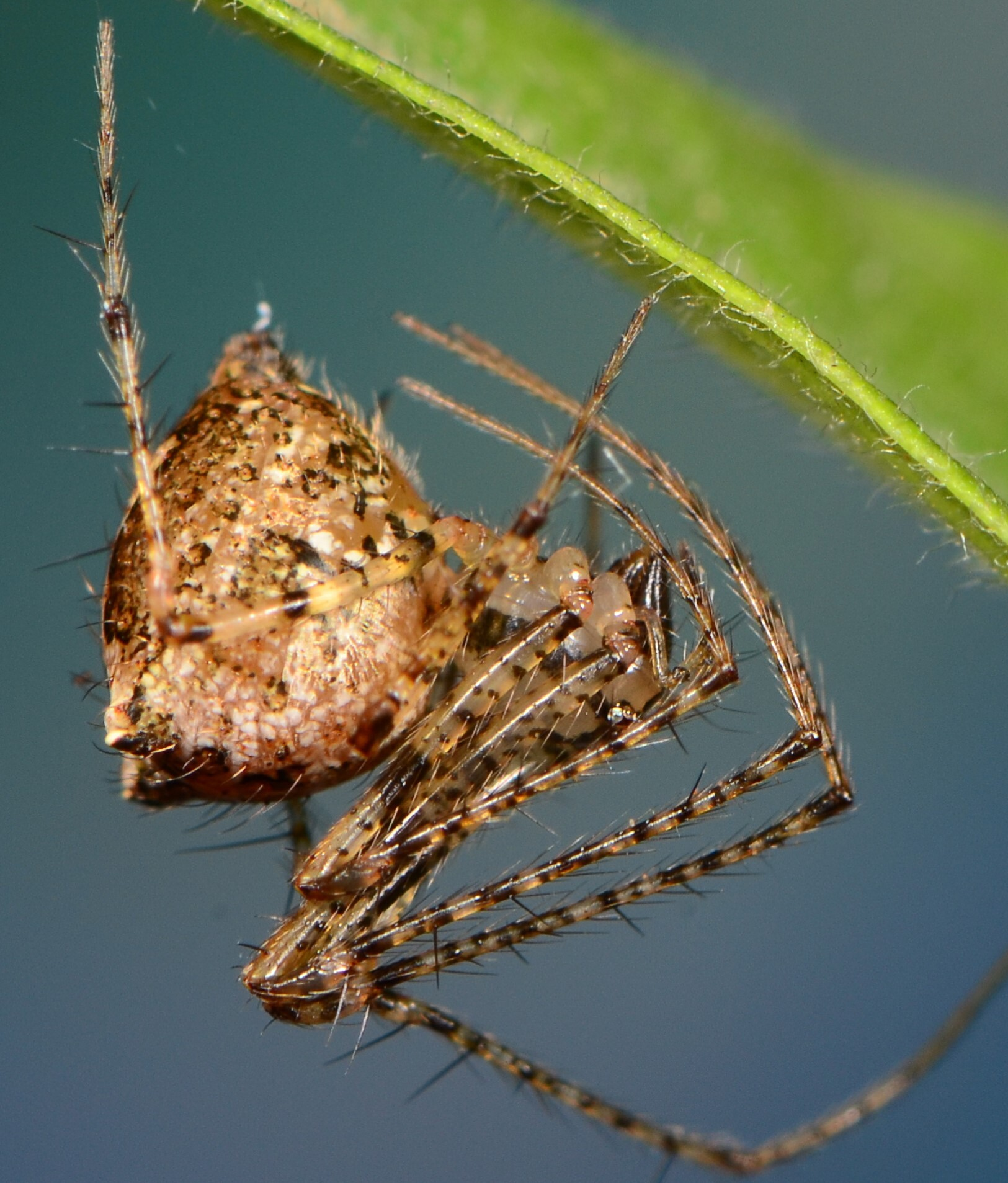
- Female
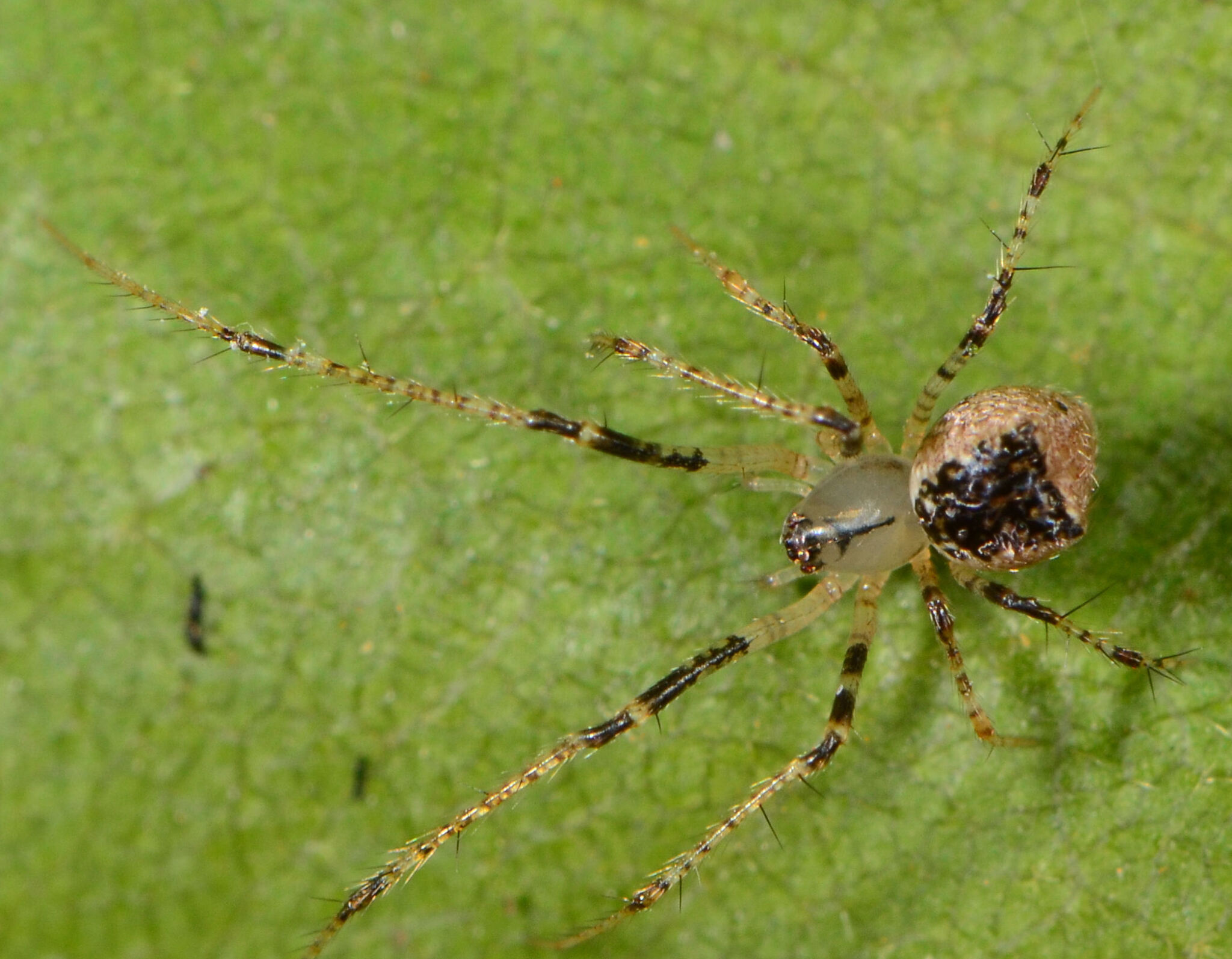
- Female

Scientific classification
- Kingdom: Animalia
- Phylum: Arthropoda
- Subphylum: Chelicerata
- Class: Arachnida
- Order: Araneae
- Infraorder: Araneomorphae
- Family: Mimetidae
- Genus: Ero
- Species: E. lawrencei

Binomial name
- Ero lawrencei Unzicker, 1966

= Ero lawrencei =

Lawrence's Ero Pirate Spider

Species of spider

Ero lawrencei is a species of spider in the family Mimetidae. It occurs in southern Africa and is commonly known as Lawrence's Ero pirate spider.

== Etymology ==
The species is named in honour of Reginald Frederick Lawrence, a prominent South African arachnologist who made significant contributions to the study of southern African spiders.

== Distribution ==
Ero lawrencei occurs in Zimbabwe and three provinces in South Africa, Eastern Cape, KwaZulu-Natal, and Limpopo. The species has been recorded at altitudes ranging from 29 to 1,646 m above sea level.

== Habitat and ecology ==
Ero lawrencei is a free-living spider found on vegetation that feeds on other spiders. The species has been sampled from the Grassland and Savanna biomes.

== Description ==
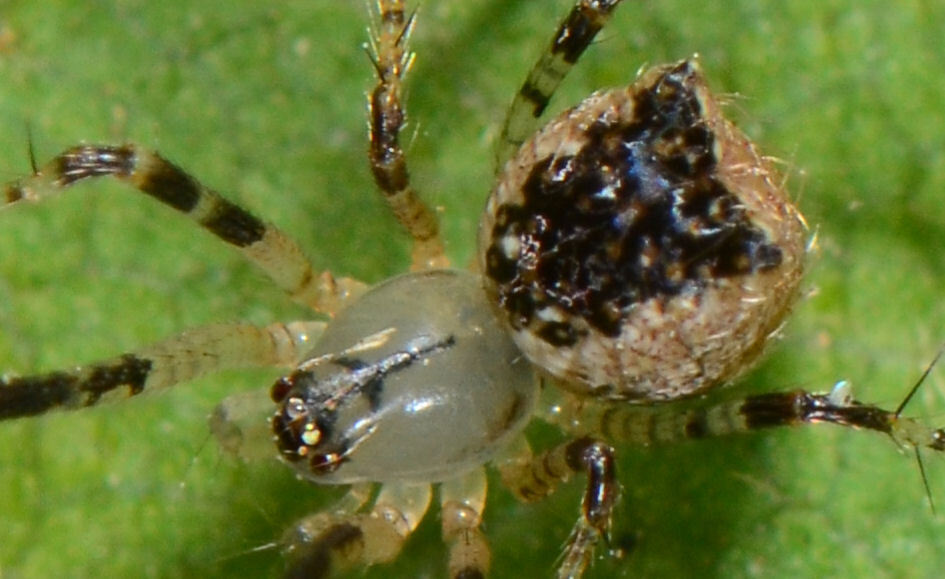
Female

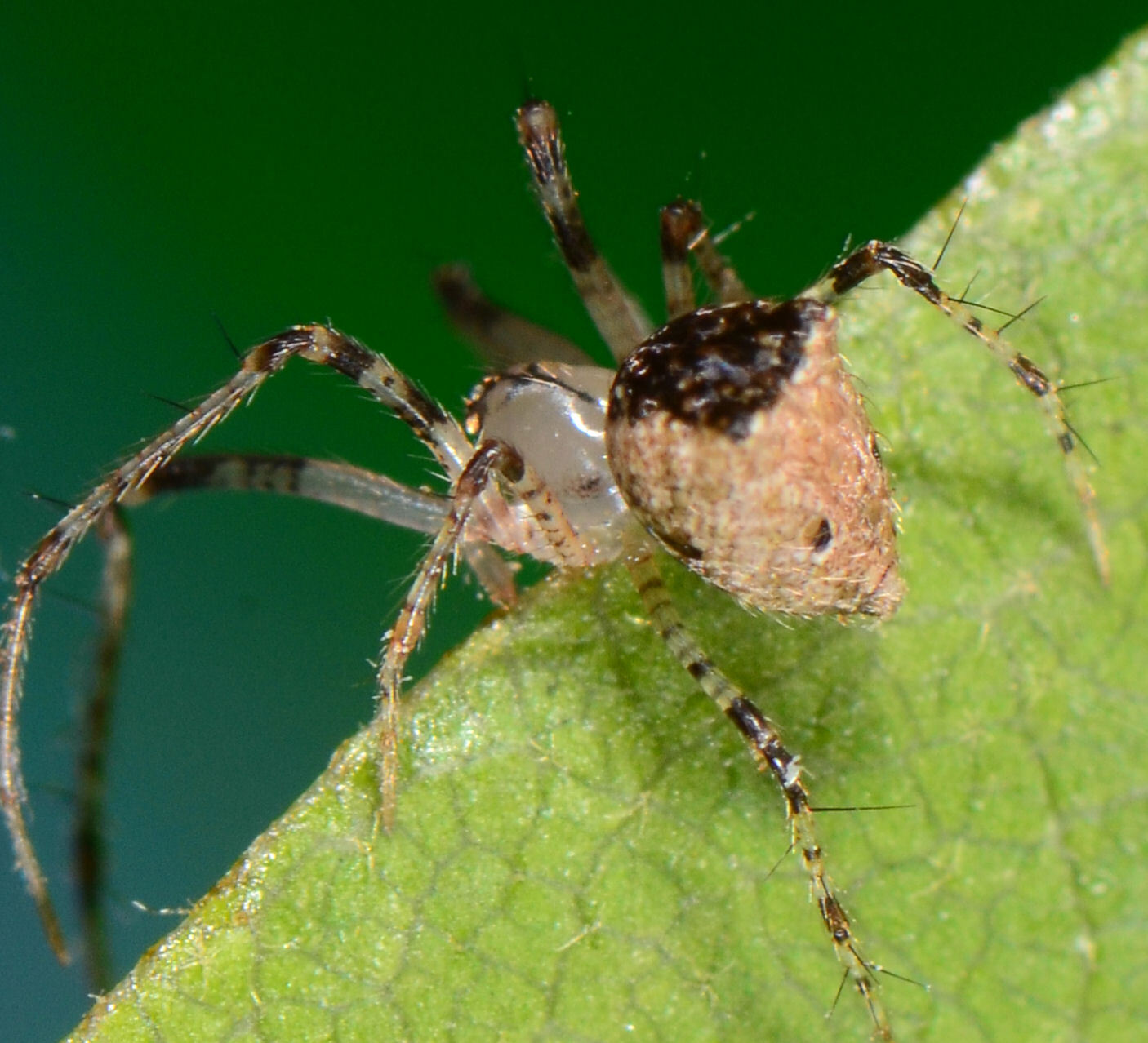
Female

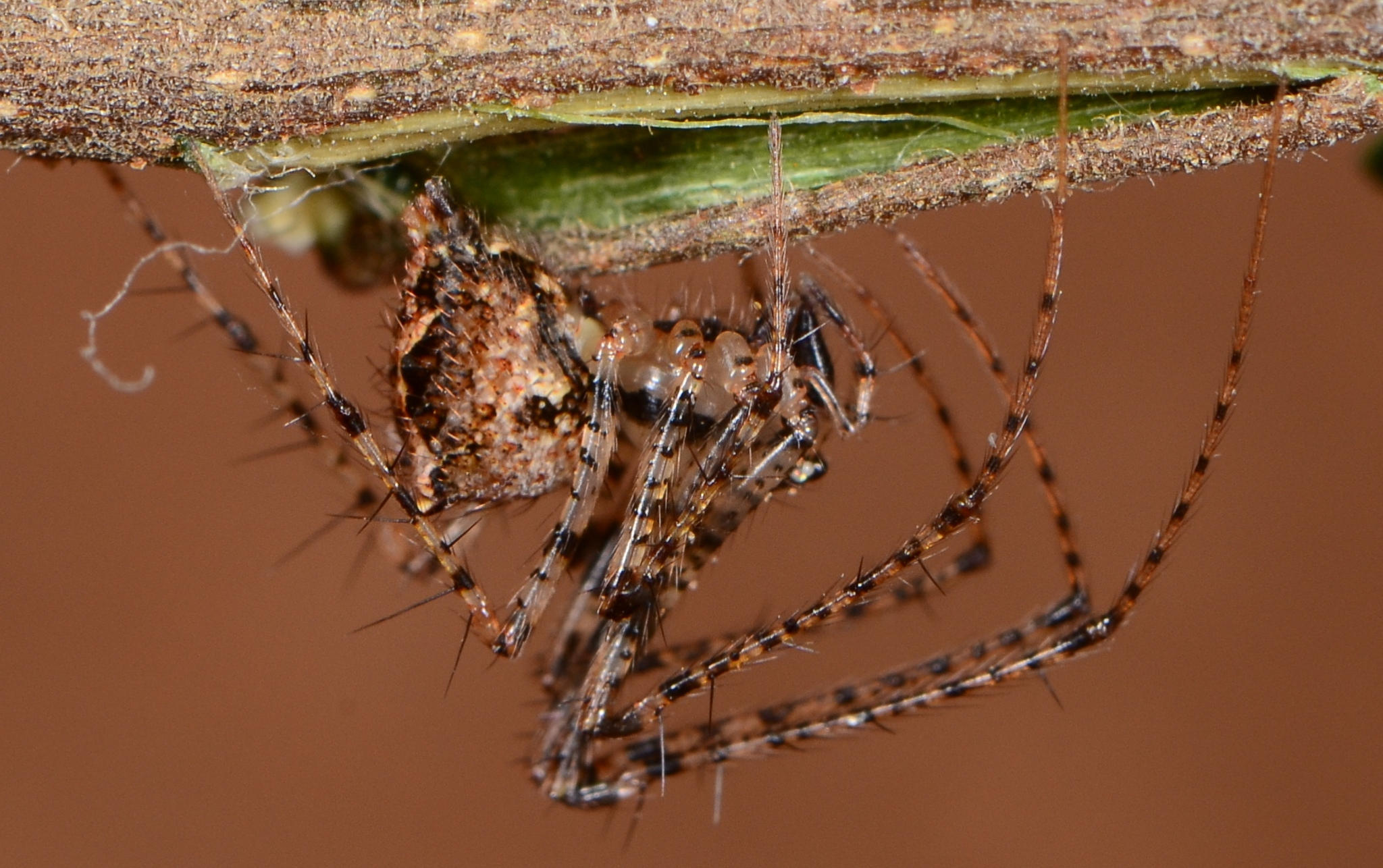
Female

Ero lawrencei is known from both sexes. Females have a total length of 4.30 mm, while males measure 3.6 mm. The carapace has a distinct fovea and is light yellow with brown markings. The abdomen measures 2.25 mm in length and bears tubercles and spines in both sexes. There is a distinctive white area on the dorsal surface starting between the tubercles and tapering towards the base of the spinnerets where it narrows. The edges of the white area are sinuate, and the remainder of the abdomen is dark except for another white area located just behind the epigyne in females.

== Conservation ==
Ero lawrencei is listed as Least Concern by the South African National Biodiversity Institute due to its wide geographical range. The species is protected in Ndumo Game Reserve, Oribi Gorge Nature Reserve, Tembe Elephant Park, Blouberg Nature Reserve, and Lekgalameetse Nature Reserve.

== Taxonomy ==
The species was described by John D. Unzicker in 1966 from specimens collected at the Kasouga River near Grahamstown in the Eastern Cape.
