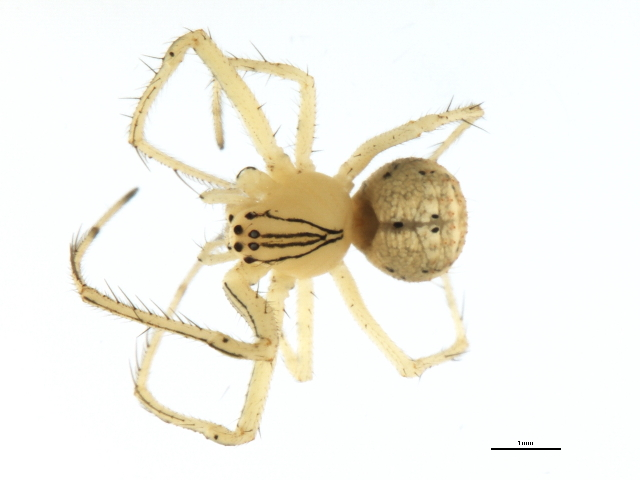
- M. epeiroides

Scientific classification
- Domain: Eukaryota
- Kingdom: Animalia
- Phylum: Arthropoda
- Subphylum: Chelicerata
- Class: Arachnida
- Order: Araneae
- Infraorder: Araneomorphae
- Family: Mimetidae
- Genus: Mimetus
- Species: M. epeiroides

Binomial name
- Mimetus epeiroides Emerton, 1882

= Mimetus epeiroides =

Species of spider

Mimetus epeiroides is a species of pirate spider in the family Mimetidae. It is found in the United States.
