= Mimetus sagittifer =

Scientific classification
- Kingdom: Animalia
- Phylum: Arthropoda
- Subphylum: Chelicerata
- Class: Arachnida
- Order: Araneae
- Infraorder: Araneomorphae
- Family: Mimetidae
- Genus: Mimetus
- Species: M. sagittifer

Binomial name
- Mimetus sagittifer (Simon, 1895)

Synonyms
- Phobetinus sagittifer Simon, 1895

Species of spider

Mimetus sagittifer is a species of spider in the family Mimetidae. It is endemic to Sri Lanka.
