= Gelanor siquirres =

Scientific classification
- Domain: Eukaryota
- Kingdom: Animalia
- Phylum: Arthropoda
- Subphylum: Chelicerata
- Class: Arachnida
- Order: Araneae
- Infraorder: Araneomorphae
- Family: Mimetidae
- Genus: Gelanor
- Species: G. siquirres

Binomial name
- Gelanor siquirres Benavides & Hormiga, 2016

Species of spider

Gelanor siquirres is a species of neotropical spiders from Costa Rica in the family Mimetidae. It hunts by intercepting the lines orb weavers use to start their webs with its own silk lines, pursuing the captured weavers.
