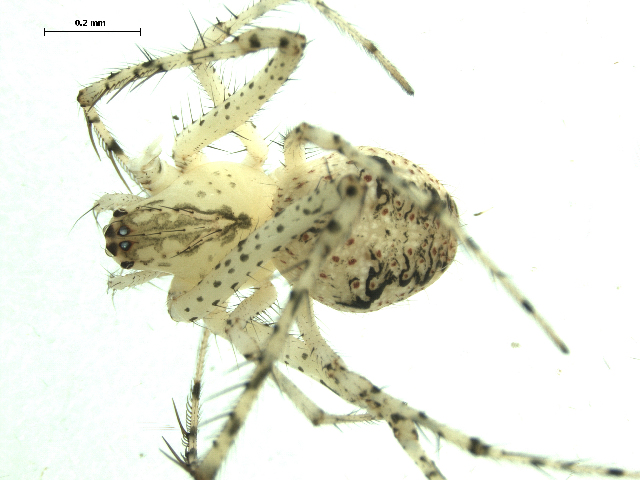
- Mimetus notius, female
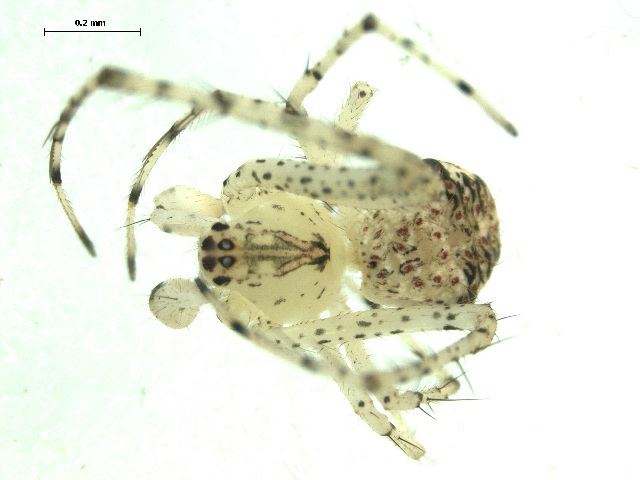
- Mimetus notius, male

Scientific classification
- Kingdom: Animalia
- Phylum: Arthropoda
- Subphylum: Chelicerata
- Class: Arachnida
- Order: Araneae
- Infraorder: Araneomorphae
- Family: Mimetidae
- Genus: Mimetus
- Species: M. notius

Binomial name
- Mimetus notius Chamberlin, 1923

= Mimetus notius =

Species of spider

Mimetus notius is a species of pirate spiders in the family Mimetidae. It is found in the USA.
