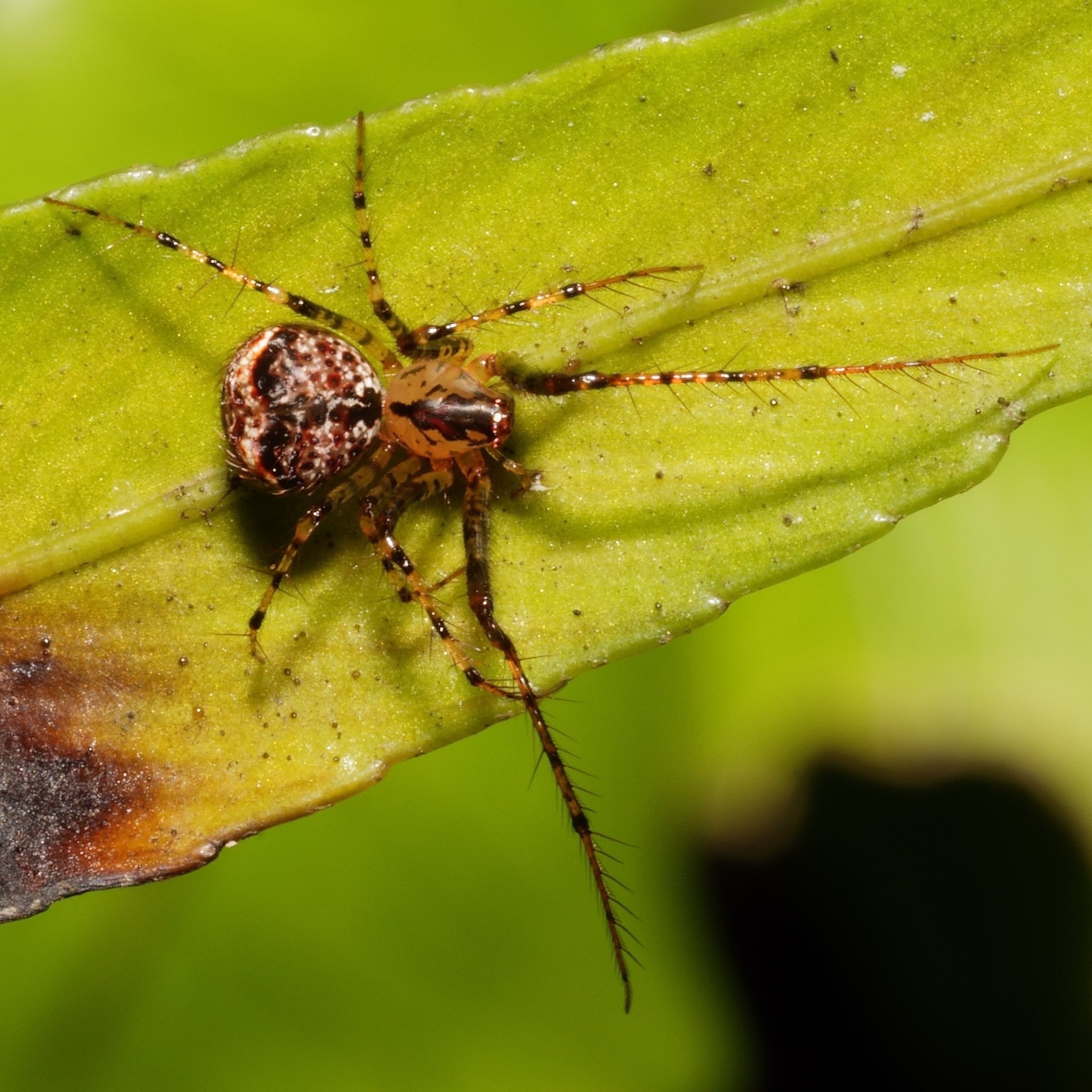

Conservation status
- Not Threatened (NZ TCS)

Scientific classification
- Kingdom: Animalia
- Phylum: Arthropoda
- Subphylum: Chelicerata
- Class: Arachnida
- Order: Araneae
- Infraorder: Araneomorphae
- Family: Mimetidae
- Genus: Australomimetus
- Species: A. mendicus

Binomial name
- Australomimetus mendicus (O. Pickard-Cambridge, 1880)

Synonyms
- Mimetus mendicus Mimetus atri-cinctus

= Australomimetus mendicus =

Species of spider

Australomimetus mendicus is a species of Mimetidae that is endemic to New Zealand.

== Taxonomy ==
This species was described as Mimetus mendicus in 1880 by Octavius Pickard-Cambridge. It was most recently transferred to the Australomimetus in 2009.

== Description ==
The cephalothorax is orange to yellow coloured with a black marking dorsally. Similarly, the legs are orange with black bands. The abdomen has a mottled black, red and white pattern.

== Distribution ==
This species is known from both islands of New Zealand.

== Conservation status ==
Under the New Zealand Threat Classification System, this species is listed as "Not Threatened".
