= Anansi luki =

Scientific classification
- Kingdom: Animalia
- Phylum: Arthropoda
- Subphylum: Chelicerata
- Class: Arachnida
- Order: Araneae
- Infraorder: Araneomorphae
- Family: Mimetidae
- Genus: Anansi
- Species: A. luki

Binomial name
- Anansi luki Benavides & Hormiga, 2017

Species of spider

Anansi luki is a species of pirate spider in the family Mimetidae. It is the type species of the genus Anansi and is found in the Democratic Republic of the Congo and Gabon.

== Etymology ==
The species name is a noun in apposition taken from the type locality, the Luki Forest Reserve in the Democratic Republic of the Congo.

== Description ==
Males measure 5.37 mm in total length. Females are slightly smaller at 4.77 mm total length. The carapace is pale yellow with two lines of macrosetae running from the fovea to the ocular area. The sternum is yellowish in males and light yellow with scattered grey spots in females.

Like other members of its genus, A. luki possesses four dorsal abdominal humps bearing specialized thick bristles (macrosetae) at their tips. The chelicerae are approximately 2.1 times longer than the clypeus width, yellow with dark brown distal margins.

Males can be distinguished from other Anansi species by having a long ectobasal cymbial process that is half the total cymbium length, and a conductor flagellum that is 1.5 times the maximum width of the cymbium. In A. insidiator, the ectobasal cymbial process is shorter and the flagellum is only as long as the maximum cymbium width. The male cymbium is twice as long as wide and bears a finger-shaped process on the base of the ectal margin.

Females have a distinctive epigyne that projects posteriorly and is twice as long as wide, with a bifid distal end that folds upwards. This differs from A. insidiator where the distal end is entire and folds downwards. The spermathecae are oval-shaped, with copulatory ducts 1.2 times the length of the spermathecae.

== Distribution and habitat ==
Anansi luki is known from the Democratic Republic of the Congo (Bas-Congo Province, particularly the Mayombe region and Luki Forest Reserve) and Gabon (Ogooué-Ivindo Province). Specimens have been collected from both primary and secondary rainforest habitats, typically found on forest tree trunks and vegetation.

== Taxonomy ==
The species was described in 2017 by Ligia R. Benavides and Gustavo Hormiga based on specimens collected from the Luki Forest Reserve in the Democratic Republic of the Congo. The male holotype and female paratype were collected in 2006 and 2007 respectively.
