= Gelanor juruti =

Scientific classification
- Kingdom: Animalia
- Phylum: Arthropoda
- Subphylum: Chelicerata
- Class: Arachnida
- Order: Araneae
- Infraorder: Araneomorphae
- Family: Mimetidae
- Genus: Gelanor
- Species: G. juruti

Binomial name
- Gelanor juruti Benavides & Hormiga, 2016

Species of spider

Gelanor juruti is a species of neotropical spiders from South America (Venezuela, Guyana, Brazil) in the family Mimetidae.
