= Melaenosia =

Scientific classification
- Kingdom: Animalia
- Phylum: Arthropoda
- Subphylum: Chelicerata
- Class: Arachnida
- Order: Araneae
- Infraorder: Araneomorphae
- Family: Mimetidae
- Genus: Melaenosia
- Species: M. pustulifera

Binomial name
- Melaenosia pustulifera Simon, 1906

Genus of spiders

Melaenosia is a genus of spiders in the family Mimetidae. It was first described in 1906 by Simon. As of 2017, it contains only one Indian species, Melaenosia pustulifera.
