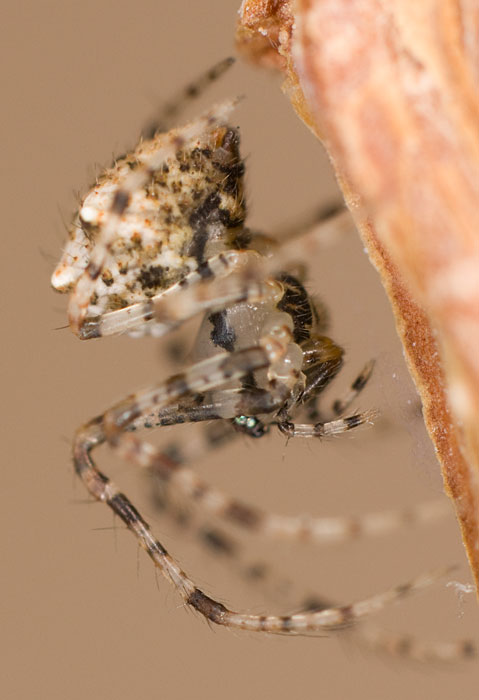
- Ero aphana, female

Scientific classification
- Kingdom: Animalia
- Phylum: Arthropoda
- Subphylum: Chelicerata
- Class: Arachnida
- Order: Araneae
- Infraorder: Araneomorphae
- Family: Mimetidae
- Genus: Ero
- Species: E. aphana

Binomial name
- Ero aphana (Walckenaer, 1802)

Synonyms
- Aranea aphana Walckenaer, 1802; Ero atomaria C. L. Koch, 1845; Ero luzonensis Yin et al., 2012; Theridion aphana Walckenaer, 1805

= Ero aphana =

Species of spider

Ero aphana is a species of pirate spider in the family Mimetidae. It is a hunting spider and feeds on other spiders.

== Distribution ==
This spider has a palearctic distribution and is found in Western Europe, most commonly in Belgium, Germany, France and the United Kingdom. It is recorded in the fauna list of Parley Common, a Site of Special Scientific Interest in Dorset, England.

It has been introduced into Saint Helena, Queensland and Western Australia.

== Description ==
Ero aphana grows to about three millimetres long, the females being slightly larger than the males. The sternum is dark coloured with radiating pale markings in the posterior half and a larger, irregular pale blotch in the anterior half. The abdomen is broad and globular, light grey with darker brownish grey patches, craggy tubercles and sparse hairs growing out of orange spots. The legs are hairy and pale coloured with dark bands and one thin orange band. The front two pairs of legs bear a marginal row of long, curved spines.

== Habitat ==
At the northern limit of its distribution, this species is usually found on heather and other low vegetation in heathlands. This is the case in England where the species seems to be on the increase and is found on dry heathland with patches of bare stony ground and among sparse Ulex europaeus and Pinus sylvestris. In warmer parts of Europe it occupies more diverse habitats including the edges of coniferous forests, trees and bushes and also parks and gardens.

== Feeding behaviour ==
Ero aphana is a specialised spider killer. It attacks another spider by biting one of its legs and injecting toxins. It quickly retreats so that it does not get bitten itself and waits at a safe distance. The prey soon becomes paralyzed and the attacker can start to feed safely and suck out the body fluids of the victim.
