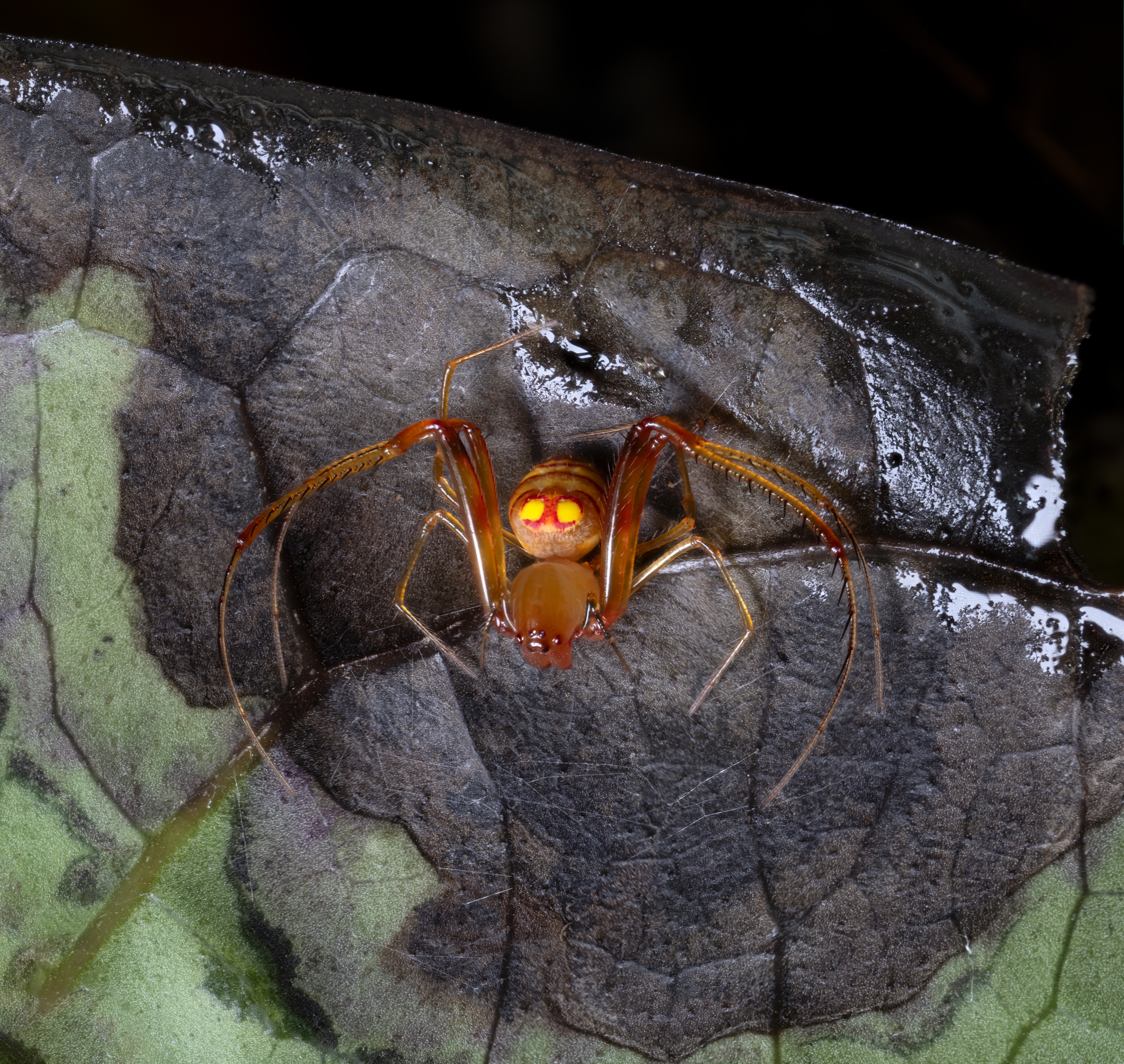

Scientific classification
- Kingdom: Animalia
- Phylum: Arthropoda
- Subphylum: Chelicerata
- Class: Arachnida
- Order: Araneae
- Infraorder: Araneomorphae
- Family: Mimetidae
- Genus: Gelanor; Thorell, 1869

= Gelanor (spider) =

Genus of spiders

Gelanor is a genus of spiders in the family Mimetidae, found in Central and South America.

== Species ==
As of August 2016, the World Spider Catalog accepted the following species:

- Gelanor altithorax Keyserling, 1893 – Brazil, Argentina
- Gelanor consequus O. Pickard-Cambridge, 1902 – Mexico, Costa Rica to Bolivia
- Gelanor fortuna Benavides & Hormiga, 2016 – Panama
- Gelanor innominatus Chamberlin, 1916 – Peru
- Gelanor juruti Benavides & Hormiga, 2016 – Venezuela, Guyana, Brazil
- Gelanor latus (Keyserling, 1881) – Mexico, Guatemala, Nicaragua to Bolivia
- Gelanor moyobamba Benavides & Hormiga, 2016 – Peru
- Gelanor muliebris Dyal, 1935 – Pakistan
- Gelanor siquirres Benavides & Hormiga, 2016 – Costa Rica
- Gelanor waorani Benavides & Hormiga, 2016 – Colombia, Ecuador, Brazil
- Gelanor zonatus (C. L. Koch, 1845) (type species) – Mexico to Uruguay
