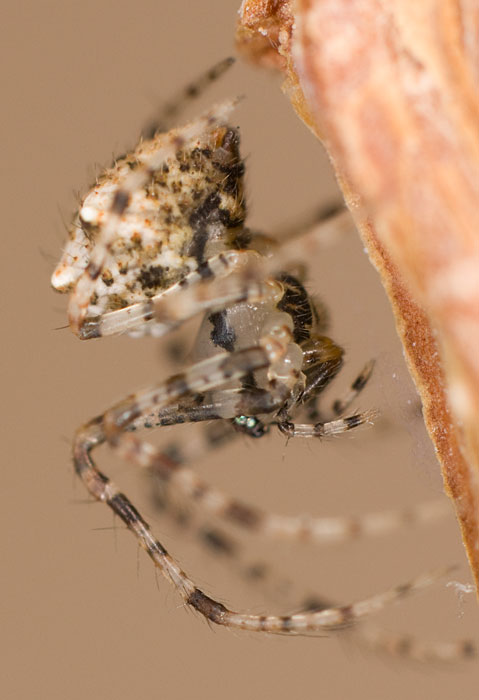
- Ero aphana, female
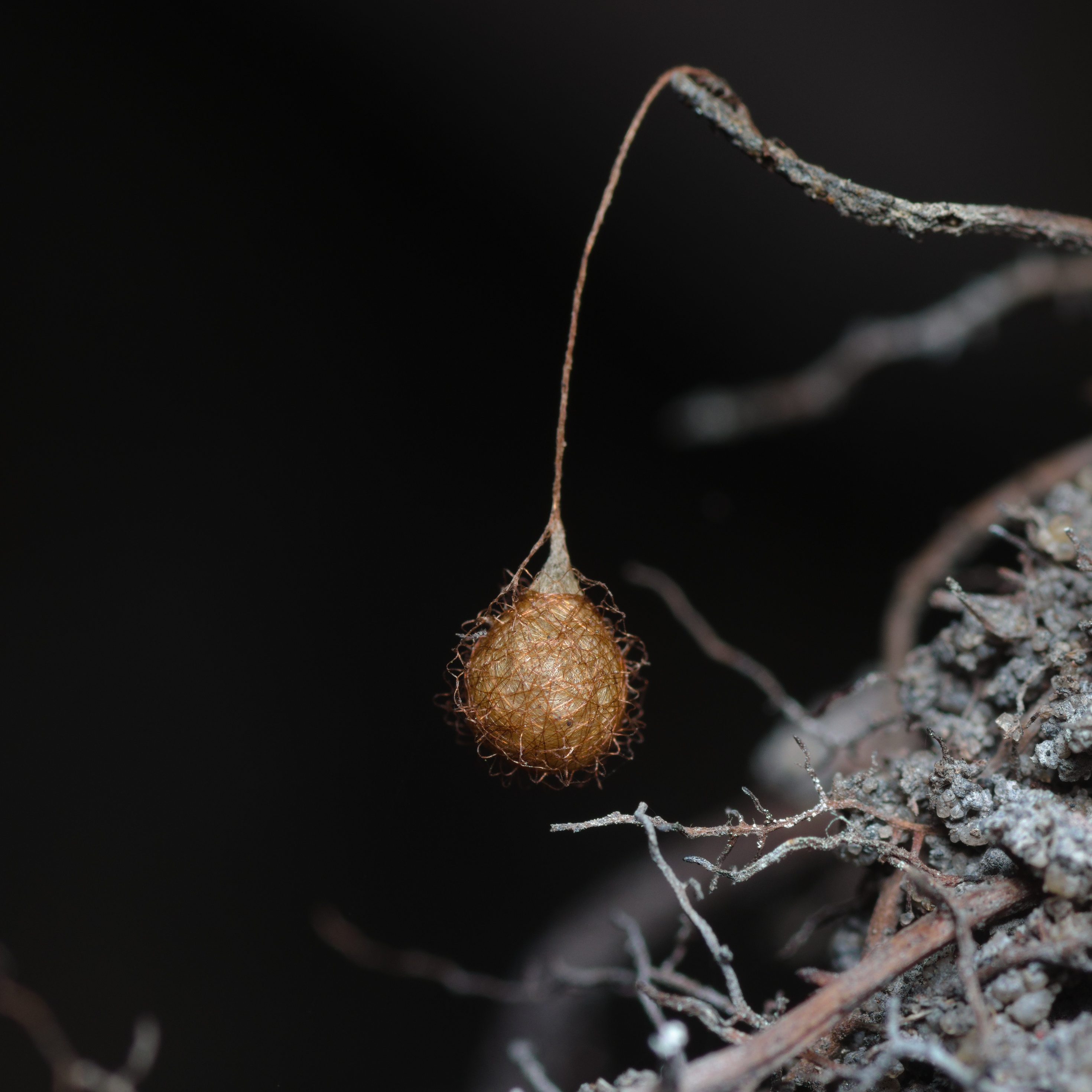
- Ero sp. egg sac, Poland

Scientific classification
- Kingdom: Animalia
- Phylum: Arthropoda
- Subphylum: Chelicerata
- Class: Arachnida
- Order: Araneae
- Infraorder: Araneomorphae
- Family: Mimetidae
- Genus: Ero; C. L. Koch, 1836

Species
- See text

= Ero (spider) =

Ero Temporal range: Palaeogene–present

Genus of spiders

Ero is a genus of pirate spiders first described in 1836. They resemble comb-footed spiders due to their globular abdomen, which is higher than it is long.

== Description ==
The upper side of their abdomen bears one or two pairs of conical tubercles and some curved bristle-like hairs. The anterior medial eyes project on small tubercles. Leg 1 is nearly twice as long as leg 4.

Their egg sacs are uniquely shaped elongated globes, about four millimetres in diameter. They are suspended from vegetation on a silken thread, and are made from an inner layer of yellowish brown silk and an outer layer of dark coloured, loosely woven silk, giving it a "woolly" appearance. The sacs are not guarded by the female, so when the juveniles hatch, they have to fend for themselves. Since Ero species are nocturnal, the adults are not often seen and the egg sacks often reveal their presence before specimens are found.

== Feeding behaviour ==
Spiders in this genus are specialised spider killers. They attack potential victims by biting one of its legs and injecting toxins. It quickly retreats as the prey spider becomes paralysed. When its prey is immobile, it feeds by sucking out the victim's body fluids.

== Species ==
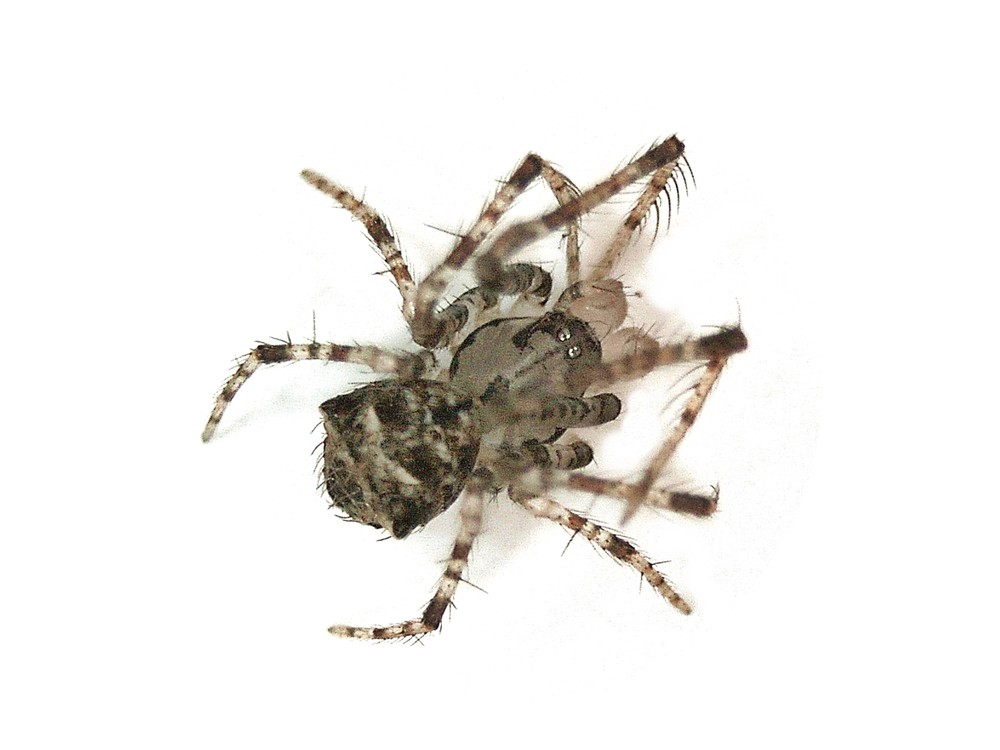
E. aphana

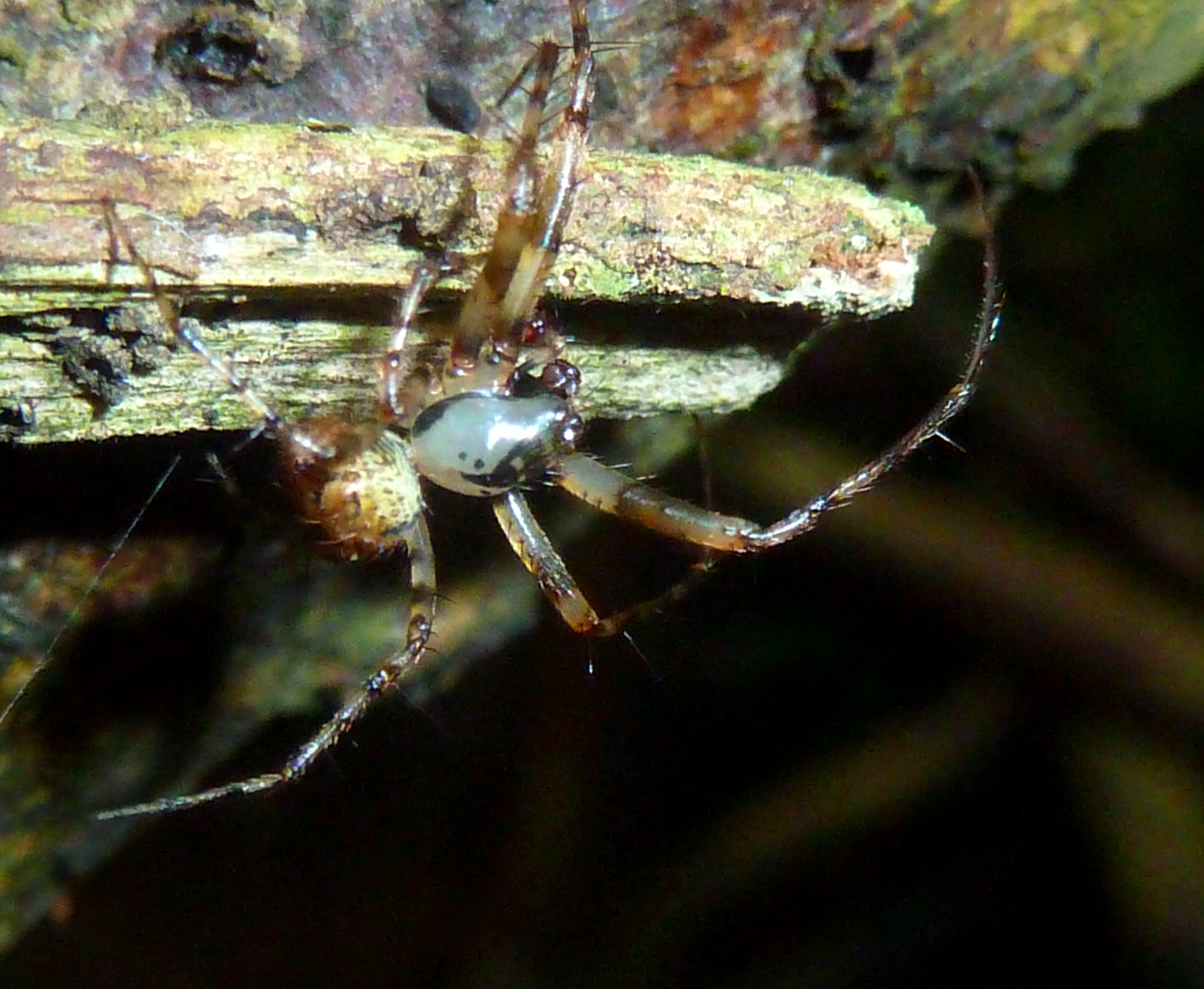
male E. capensis

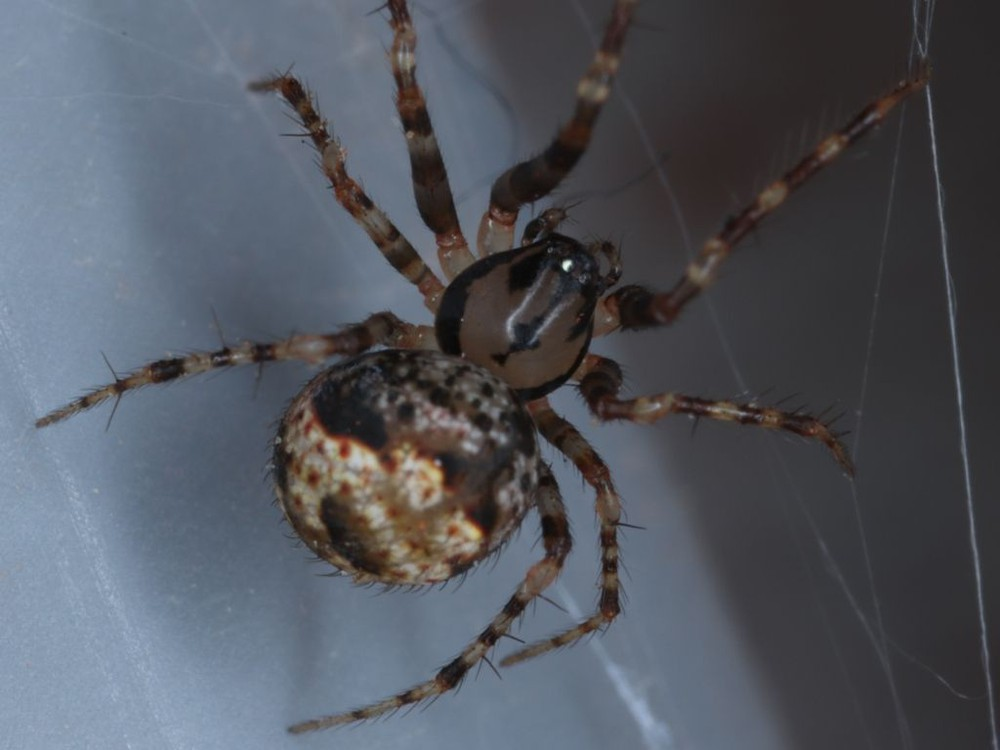
E. furcata

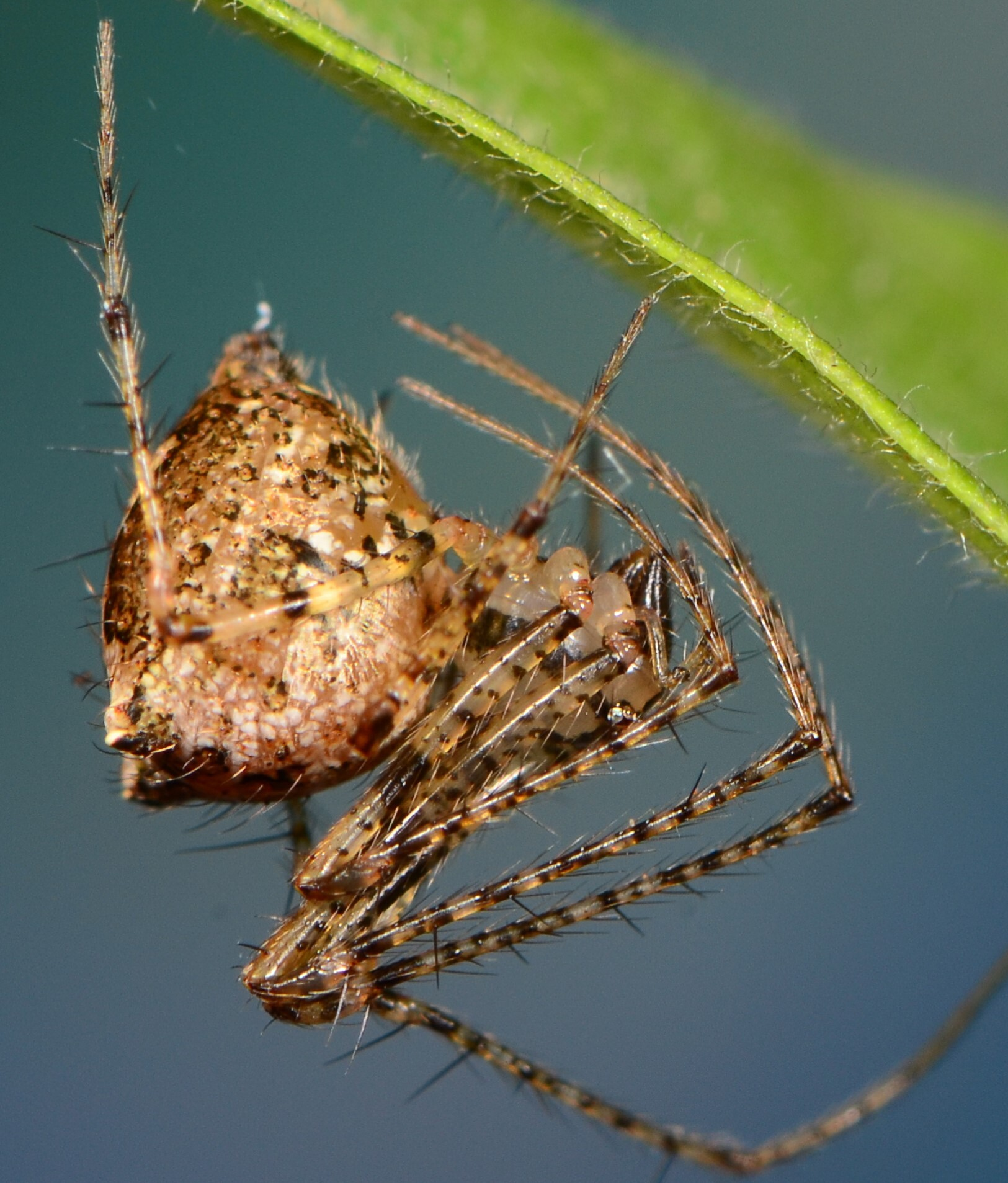
female E. lawrencei

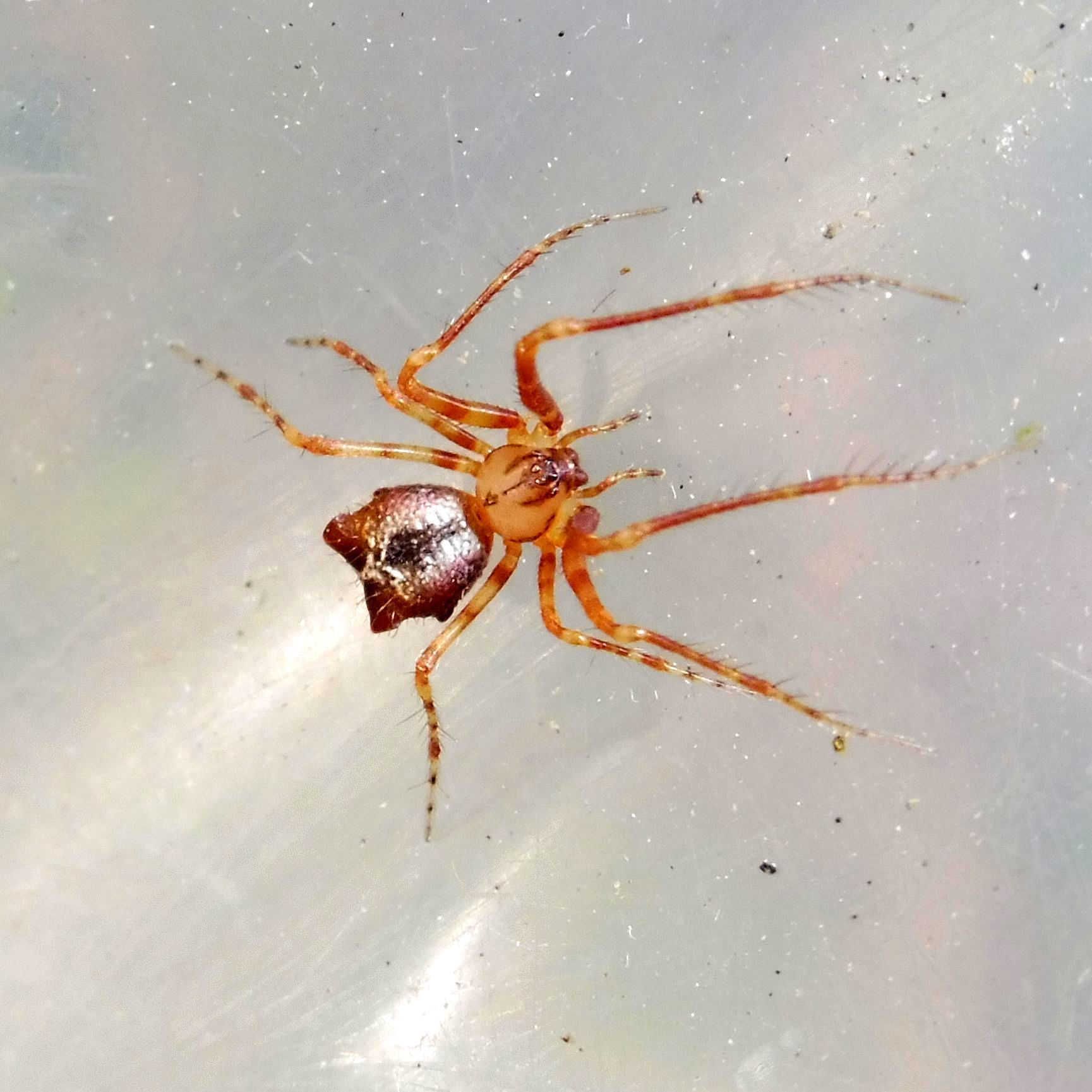
E. tuberculata

As of October 2025, this genus includes 43 species:

- Ero aphana (Walckenaer, 1802) – Macaronesia, Europe, North Africa, Turkey, Caucasus, Russia (Europe to Central Asia), Kazakhstan, Iran. Introduced to Réunion, Japan (Ryukyu Is.), China, Philippines, Australia (Queensland, Western Australia)
- Ero cachinnans Brignoli, 1978 – Bhutan
- Ero cambridgei Kulczyński, 1911 – Canary Islands, Europe, Turkey, Israel, Russia (Europe to Far East), Korea, Japan
- Ero canala Wang, 1990 – China
- Ero canionis Chamberlin & Ivie, 1935 – Canada, United States
- Ero capensis Simon, 1895 – South Africa, Eswatini
- Ero catharinae Keyserling, 1886 – Brazil
- Ero comorensis Emerit, 1996 – Comoros, Seychelles
- Ero eburnea Thaler, 2004 – Ivory Coast
- Ero felix Thaler & van Harten, 2004 – Yemen
- Ero flammeola Simon, 1881 – Canary Islands, Algeria, Portugal to Greece (Corfu), Ukraine, Russia (Caucasus), Turkey, Israel
- Ero furcata (Villers, 1789) – Azores, Europe, Turkey, Caucasus, Russia (Europe to Far East), Turkmenistan, Japan
- Ero furuncula Simon, 1909 – Vietnam
- Ero galea Wang, 1990 – China
- Ero ganglia Yin & Bao, 2012 – China
- Ero gemelosi Baert & Maelfait, 1984 – Galapagos
- Ero goeldii Keyserling, 1891 – Brazil
- Ero gracilis Keyserling, 1891 – Brazil
- Ero humilithorax Keyserling, 1886 – Brazil
- Ero japonica Bösenberg & Strand, 1906 – Russia (Far East), China, Korea, Japan
- Ero jiafui Yin & Bao, 2012 – China
- Ero kompirensis Strand, 1918 – Japan
- Ero koreana Paik, 1967 – Bulgaria, Ukraine, Georgia, Russia (Europe to Far East), Kazakhstan, Mongolia, China, Korea, Japan
- Ero laeta Barrientos, 2017 – Portugal, Spain
- Ero lata Keyserling, 1891 – Brazil
- Ero lawrencei Unzicker, 1966 – Zimbabwe, South Africa
- Ero leonina (Hentz, 1850) – Canada, United States
- Ero lizae Sherwood, Henrard, Peters, Price, Hall, White, Grignet & Wilkins, 2024 – St. Helena
- Ero lodingi Archer, 1941 – United States
- Ero lokobeana Emerit, 1980 – Madagascar
- Ero madagascariensis Emerit, 1980 – Madagascar
- Ero melanostoma Mello-Leitão, 1929 – Brazil
- Ero mongolica Cai, Wang & Zhang, 2023 – China
- Ero natashae Sherwood, Henrard, Peters, Price, Hall, White, Grignet & Wilkins, 2024 – St. Helena
- Ero pensacolae Ivie & Barrows, 1935 – United States
- Ero quadrituberculata Kulczyński, 1905 – Madeira
- Ero salittana Barrion & Litsinger, 1995 – Philippines
- Ero septemspinosa Lissner, 2016 – Spain (Balearic Is.)
- Ero spinifrons Mello-Leitão, 1929 – Brazil
- Ero spinipes (Nicolet, 1849) – Chile, Argentina
- Ero tenebrosa Lissner, 2018 – Canary Islands
- Ero tuberculata (De Geer, 1778) – Europe, Russia (Europe to Central Asia), Central Asia, China (type species)
- Ero valida Keyserling, 1891 – Brazil

== Taxonomy ==
Sherwood revised this genus in 2023.
