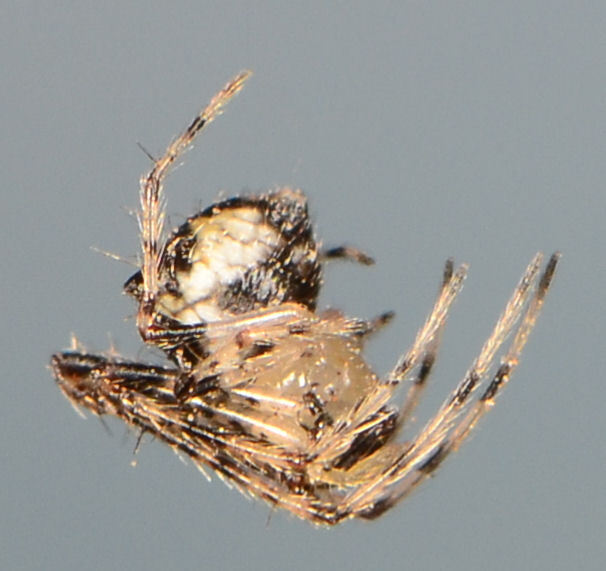
- Female
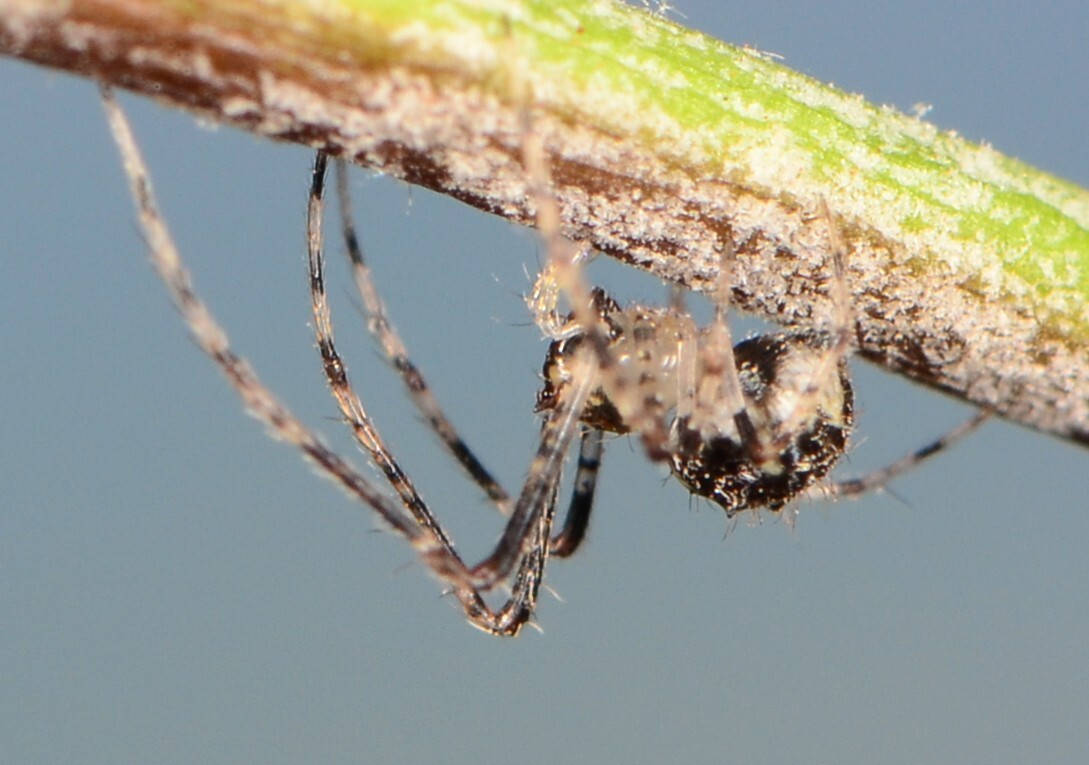
- Female

Scientific classification
- Kingdom: Animalia
- Phylum: Arthropoda
- Subphylum: Chelicerata
- Class: Arachnida
- Order: Araneae
- Infraorder: Araneomorphae
- Family: Mimetidae
- Genus: Mimetus
- Species: M. cornutus

Binomial name
- Mimetus cornutus Lawrence, 1947

= Mimetus cornutus =

Horned Mimetus Pirate Spider

Species of spider

Mimetus cornutus is a species of spider in the family Mimetidae. It occurs in southern Africa and is commonly known as the horned Mimetus pirate spider.

== Distribution ==
Mimetus cornutus occurs in Botswana, Mozambique, and two provinces in South Africa, KwaZulu-Natal and Limpopo. The species has been recorded at altitudes ranging from 47 to 1,393 m (154 to 4,570 ft) above sea level.

== Habitat and ecology ==
Mimetus cornutus is a free-living spider found on vegetation that feeds on other spiders. The species has been sampled from the Indian Ocean Coastal Belt and Savanna biomes.

== Description ==
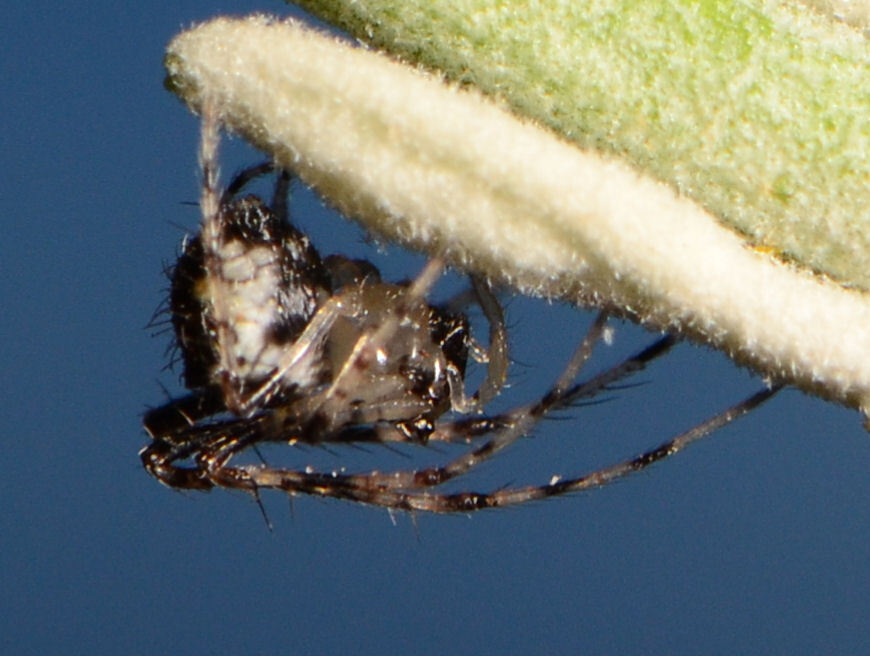
Female

== Conservation ==
Mimetus cornutus is listed as Least Concern by the South African National Biodiversity Institute due to its wide geographical range. The species is protected in Ndumo Game Reserve, Tembe Elephant Park, uMkhuze Game Reserve, Entabeni Nature Reserve, and Lhuvhondo Nature Reserve. More sampling is needed to collect and describe the male.

== Taxonomy ==
The species was originally described by R. F. Lawrence in 1947 from a specimen collected in Durban, KwaZulu-Natal. The species has not undergone taxonomic revision and males remain undescribed despite being collected.
