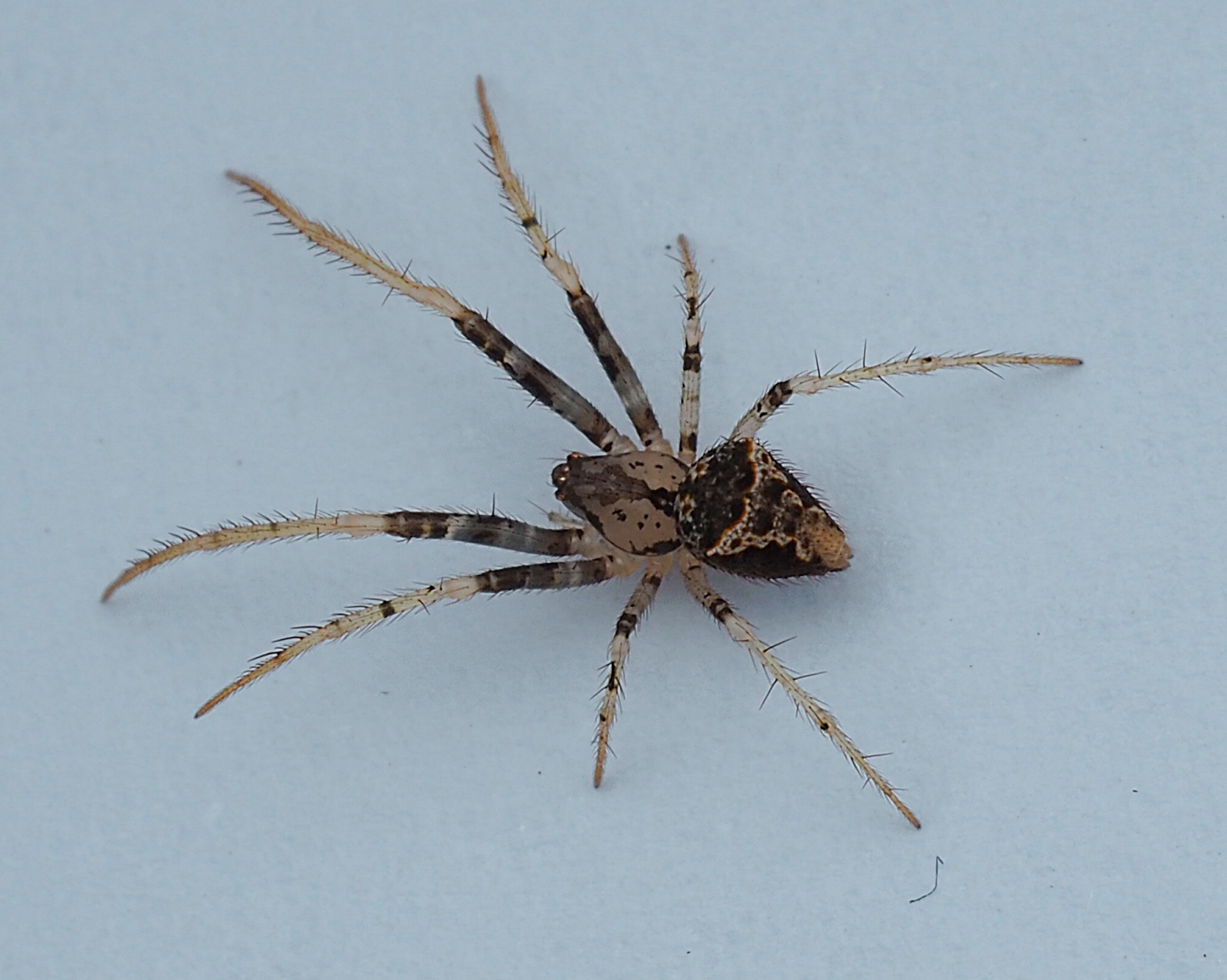
- Australomimetus hartleyensis

Scientific classification
- Domain: Eukaryota
- Kingdom: Animalia
- Phylum: Arthropoda
- Subphylum: Chelicerata
- Class: Arachnida
- Order: Araneae
- Infraorder: Araneomorphae
- Family: Mimetidae
- Genus: Australomimetus; Heimer

Type species
- Australomimetus maculosus

Species
- 31, see text

= Australomimetus =

Genus of spiders

Australomimetus is a genus of spiders in the family Mimetidae. It was first described in 1986 by Heimer. As of 2017, it contains 31 species.

== Species ==
Australomimetus comprises the following species:

- Australomimetus annulipes Heimer, 1986
- Australomimetus audax (Hickman, 1929)
- Australomimetus aurioculatus (Hickman, 1929)
- Australomimetus burnetti Heimer, 1986
- Australomimetus catulli (Heimer, 1989)
- Australomimetus childersiensis Heimer, 1986
- Australomimetus daviesianus Heimer, 1986
- Australomimetus diabolicus Harms & Harvey, 2009
- Australomimetus djuka Harms & Harvey, 2009
- Australomimetus dunlopi Harms & Harvey, 2009
- Australomimetus hannemanni (Heimer, 1989)
- Australomimetus hartleyensis Heimer, 1986
- Australomimetus hertelianus Heimer, 1986
- Australomimetus hirsutus Heimer, 1986
- Australomimetus japonicus (Uyemura, 1938)
- Australomimetus kioloensis Heimer, 1986
- Australomimetus maculosus (Rainbow, 1904)
- Australomimetus mendax Harms & Harvey, 2009
- Australomimetus mendicus (O. Pickard-Cambridge, 1880)
- Australomimetus miniatus Heimer, 1986
- Australomimetus nasoi Harms & Harvey, 2009
- Australomimetus pseudomaculosus Heimer, 1986
- Australomimetus raveni Heimer, 1986
- Australomimetus robustus Heimer, 1986
- Australomimetus sennio (Urquhart, 1891)
- Australomimetus spinosus Heimer, 1986
- Australomimetus stephanieae Harms & Harvey, 2009
- Australomimetus subspinosus Heimer, 1986
- Australomimetus sydneyensis Heimer, 1986
- Australomimetus tasmaniensis (Hickman, 1928)
- Australomimetus triangulosus Heimer, 1986
