= Kratochvilia =

Scientific classification
- Kingdom: Animalia
- Phylum: Arthropoda
- Subphylum: Chelicerata
- Class: Arachnida
- Order: Araneae
- Infraorder: Araneomorphae
- Family: Mimetidae
- Genus: Kratochvilia
- Species: K. pulvinata

Binomial name
- Kratochvilia pulvinata (Simon, 1907)

Synonyms
- Miopristis pulvinata Simon, 1907

Genus of spiders

Kratochvilia is a genus of spiders in the family Mimetidae. It was first described in 1934 by Strand. As of 2017, it contains only one species, Kratochvilia pulvinata, found on Príncipe.
