= Arocha =

Scientific classification
- Kingdom: Animalia
- Phylum: Arthropoda
- Subphylum: Chelicerata
- Class: Arachnida
- Order: Araneae
- Infraorder: Araneomorphae
- Family: Mimetidae
- Genus: Arocha; Simon

Species
- Arocha erythrophthalma Simon, 1893; Arocha rochai Mello-Leitão, 1941

Genus of spiders

Arocha is a genus of spiders in the family Mimetidae. It was first described in 1893 by Simon. As of 2016, it contains 2 species found in Peru and Brazil.
