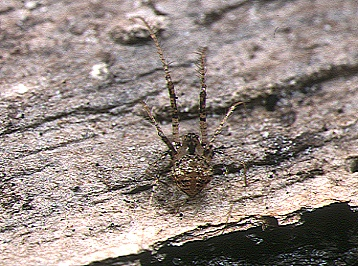
- Female Mimetus ryukyus
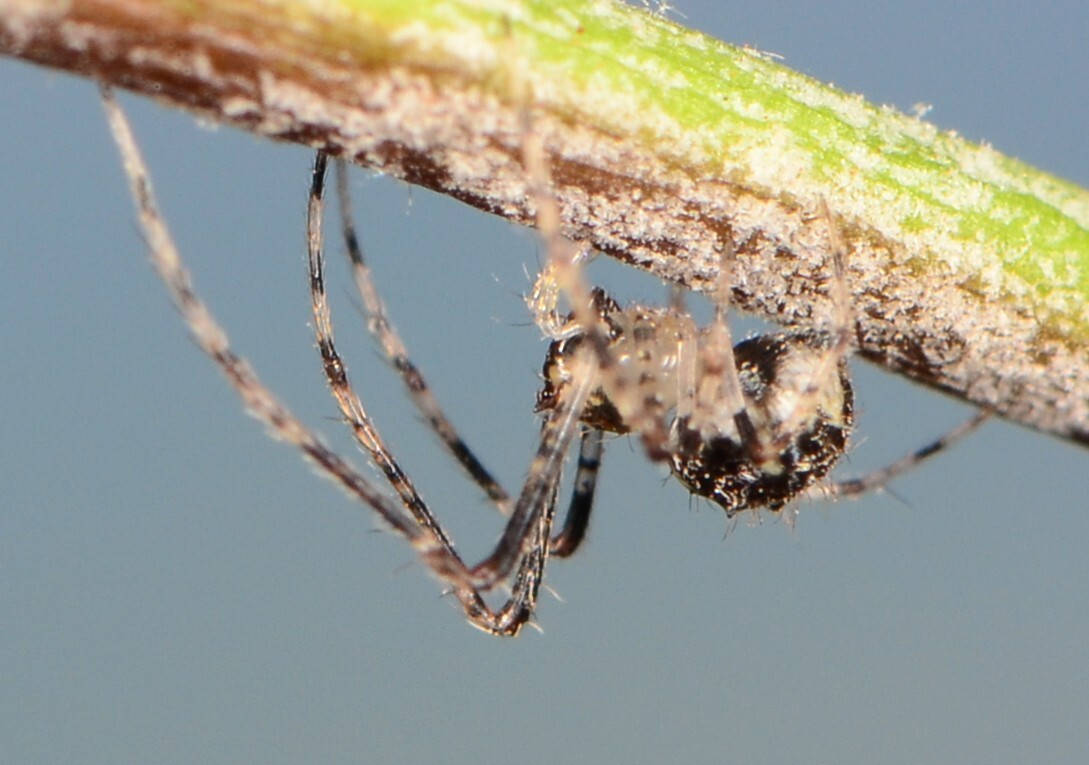
- Female Mimetus cornutus

Scientific classification
- Kingdom: Animalia
- Phylum: Arthropoda
- Subphylum: Chelicerata
- Class: Arachnida
- Order: Araneae
- Infraorder: Araneomorphae
- Family: Mimetidae
- Genus: Mimetus; Hentz, 1832

Species
- See text.

Synonyms
- Phobetinus Simon, 1895; Reo Brignoli, 1979

= Mimetus =

Mimetus Temporal range: Palaeogene–present

Cosmopolitan genus of spiders

Mimetus is a genus of pirate spiders in the family Mimetidae. They are found worldwide.

== Description ==
Members of this genus resemble the comb-footed spiders, Theridiidae, due to their globular abdomen. The upper side of this bears curved bristle-like hairs. A distinguishing mark of the genus is that the distance between the anterior edge of the carapace and the anterior medial eyes is about one-third to one-half of the distance between the anterior and posterior medial eyes. The length of the anterior legs is about 1.5–1.7 times that of the posterior pair.

== Behaviour ==
Spiders in this genus are specialised spider killers. They spin no web but are slow moving, stalking or ambushing their prey. They sometimes invade the web of their potential victim, vibrating the silk to mislead the owner. An individual will attack a potential victim by biting one of its legs and injecting toxins. It then retreats and the prey spider quickly becomes paralysed. The attacker then advances and starts to feed, sucking out the body fluids of its victim.

== Species ==
As of October 2025, this genus includes 71 species and one subspecies:

- Mimetus aktius Chamberlin & Ivie, 1935 – United States
- Mimetus arushae Caporiacco, 1947 – Tanzania
- Mimetus banksi Chickering, 1947 – Panama
- Mimetus bifurcatus Reimoser, 1939 – Costa Rica
- Mimetus bigibbosus O. Pickard-Cambridge, 1894 – Mexico, Panama
- Mimetus bishopi Caporiacco, 1949 – Kenya
- Mimetus brasilianus Keyserling, 1886 – Brazil
- Mimetus bucerus Gan, Mi, Irfan, Peng, Ran & Zhan, 2019 – China
- Mimetus caudatus Wang, 1990 – China
- Mimetus clavatus Liu, Xu, Hormiga & Yin, 2021 – China
- Mimetus comorensis Schmidt & Krause, 1994 – Comoros
- Mimetus contrarius (Zeng, Irfan & Peng, 2019) – China
- Mimetus cornutus Lawrence, 1947 – Botswana, Mozambique, South Africa
- Mimetus crudelis O. Pickard-Cambridge, 1899 – Guatemala
- Mimetus debilispinis Mello-Leitão, 1943 – Brazil
- Mimetus dentatus Liu, Xu, Hormiga & Yin, 2021 – China
- Mimetus dimissus Petrunkevitch, 1930 – Puerto Rico, Antigua
- Mimetus echinatus Wang, 1990 – China
- Mimetus epeiroides Emerton, 1882 – Canada, United States. Introduced to Galapagos
- Mimetus eutypus Chamberlin & Ivie, 1935 – United States
- Mimetus fernandi Lessert, 1930 – DR Congo
- Mimetus guiyang J. S. Zhang, Yu & Xu, 2025 – China
- Mimetus haynesi Gertsch & Mulaik, 1940 – United States
- Mimetus hesperus Chamberlin, 1923 – Canada, United States
- Mimetus hieroglyphicus Mello-Leitão, 1929 – Brazil, Paraguay
- Mimetus hirsutus O. Pickard-Cambridge, 1899 – Mexico
- Mimetus hispaniolae Bryant, 1948 – Hispaniola
- Mimetus indicus Simon, 1906 – India
- Mimetus investis (Simon, 1909) – Vietnam
- Mimetus juhuaensis (Xu, Wang & Wang, 1987) – China
- Mimetus keyserlingi Mello-Leitão, 1929 – Peru, Brazil
- Mimetus labiatus Wang, 1990 – China
- Mimetus laevigatus (Keyserling, 1863) – Mediterranean, Slovakia and Hungary to Central Asia
- Mimetus lamellaris Zeng, Wang & Peng, 2016 – China
- Mimetus lanmeiae Liu, Yu & Xu, 2025 – China
- Mimetus latro (Brignoli, 1979) – Kenya
- Mimetus liangkaii Yao & Liu, 2024 – China
- Mimetus lingbaoshanensis Gan, Mi, Irfan, Peng, Ran & Zhan, 2019 – China
- Mimetus madecassus Emerit, 1980 – Madagascar
- Mimetus margaritifer Simon, 1901 – Malaysia
- Mimetus marjorieae Barrion & Litsinger, 1995 – Philippines
- Mimetus melanoleucus Mello-Leitão, 1929 – Brazil
- Mimetus nelsoni Archer, 1950 – Canada, United States
- Mimetus niveosignatus Liu, Xu, Hormiga & Yin, 2021 – China
- Mimetus notius Chamberlin, 1923 – Canada, United States
- Mimetus parvulus Sankaran, Sudhin & Sen, 2024 – India
- Mimetus penicillatus Mello-Leitão, 1929 – Brazil
- Mimetus portoricensis Petrunkevitch, 1930 – Puerto Rico
- Mimetus puritanus Chamberlin, 1923 – Canada, United States, Jamaica
- Mimetus rapax O. Pickard-Cambridge, 1899 – Costa Rica, Panama
- Mimetus ridens Brignoli, 1975 – Philippines
- Mimetus rusticus Chickering, 1947 – Panama
- Mimetus ryukyus Yoshida, 1993 – Taiwan, Japan (Ryukyu Is.)
- Mimetus saetosus Chickering, 1956 – Panama
- Mimetus sagittifer (Simon, 1895) – Sri Lanka
- Mimetus sinicus Song & Zhu, 1993 – China
- Mimetus spinatus Sudhin, Sankaran & Sen, 2024 – India
- Mimetus strinatii Brignoli, 1972 – Sri Lanka
- Mimetus subulatus Liu, Xu, Hormiga & Yin, 2021 – China
- Mimetus syllepsicus Hentz, 1832 – United States, Mexico (type species)
  - M. s. molestus Chickering, 1937 – Mexico
- Mimetus testaceus Yaginuma, 1960 – Russia (Far East), China, Korea, Japan
- Mimetus tillandsiae Archer, 1941 – United States
- Mimetus triangularis (Keyserling, 1879) – Peru, Brazil
- Mimetus trituberculatus O. Pickard-Cambridge, 1899 – Panama
- Mimetus tuberculatus Liang & Wang, 1991 – China
- Mimetus uncatus Liu, Xu, Hormiga & Yin, 2021 – China
- Mimetus variegatus Chickering, 1956 – Panama, Bonaire
- Mimetus verecundus Chickering, 1947 – Panama
- Mimetus vespillo Brignoli, 1980 – Indonesia (Sulawesi)
- Mimetus wangi Zeng, Wang & Peng, 2016 – China
- Mimetus yinae Gan, Mi, Irfan, Peng, Ran & Zhan, 2019 – China
