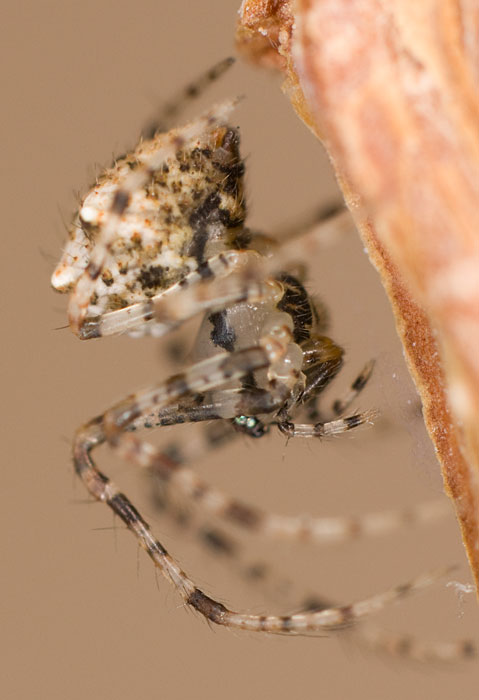
- Female Ero aphana
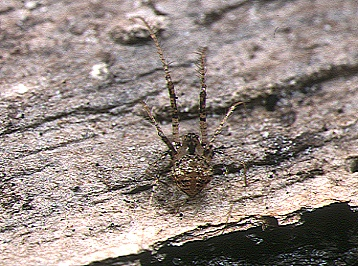
- Female Mimetus ryukyus

Scientific classification
- Kingdom: Animalia
- Phylum: Arthropoda
- Subphylum: Chelicerata
- Class: Arachnida
- Order: Araneae
- Infraorder: Araneomorphae
- Family: Mimetidae; Simon, 1881

Genera
- See text.

Diversity
- 8 genera, 166 species
- blue: reported countries (WSC) green: observation hotspots (iNaturalist)

= Pirate spider =

Pirate spiders Temporal range: Early Cretaceous–present

Family of spiders

Pirate spiders, members of the family Mimetidae, are araneomorph spiders which typically feed on other spiders.

The family Mimetidae contains roughly 200 species divided among 12 genera, of which Mimetus and Ero are the most common. Mimetids are usually yellow and brown and are usually 3 to 7 millimetres (1/8 to 1/4 in) long. Mimetids can be recognized by the rows of spine-like hairs on their long front legs; the rows consist of a long spine, followed by a series of progressively shorter ones.

== Behaviour ==
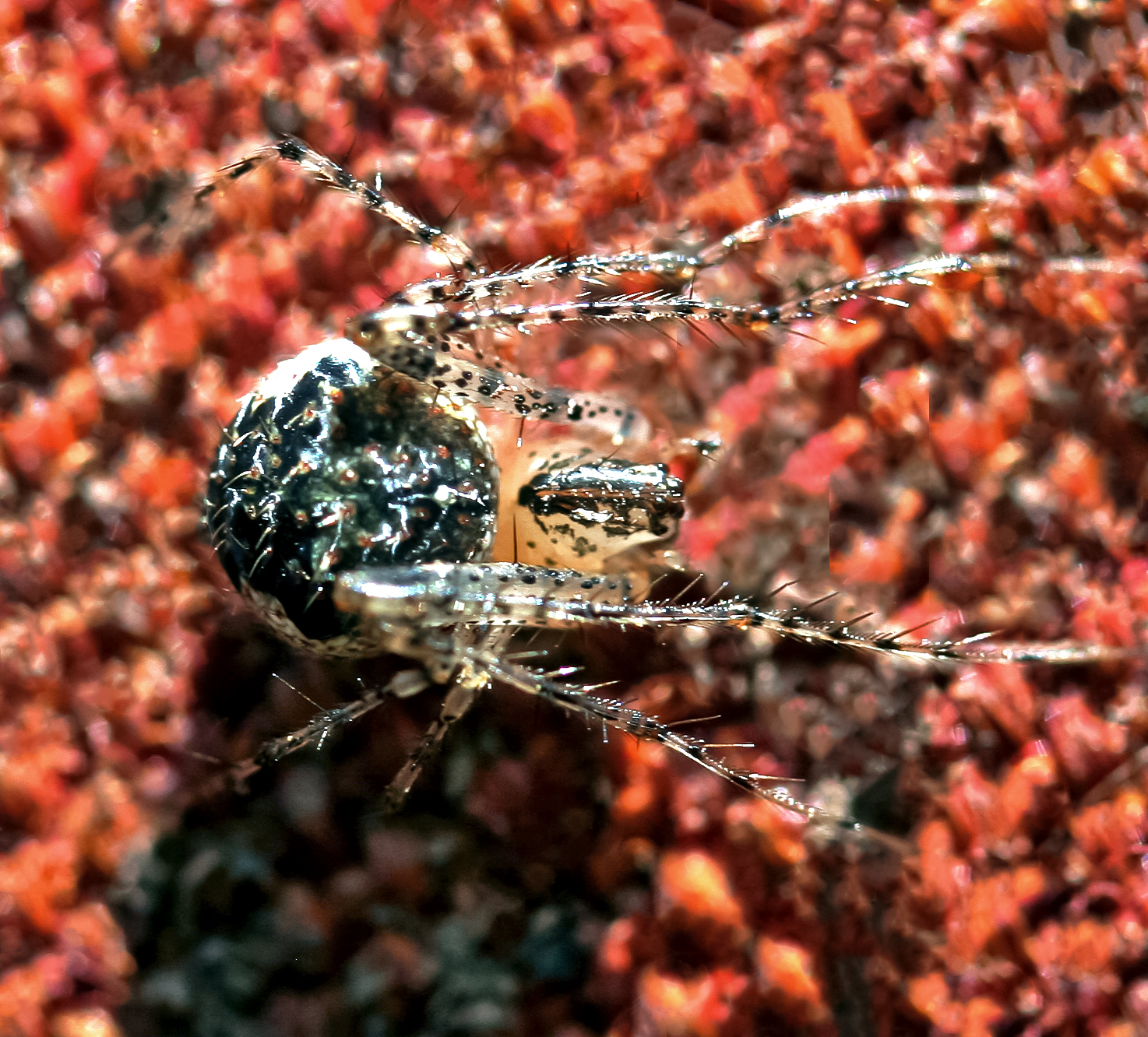
Female Mimetidae sp.

Mimetidae usually hunt by picking at the strands on their prey's web to simulate the movements of either a trapped insect or a potential mate. This strategy is a form of aggressive mimicry. When their prey comes to investigate, they are instead captured and eaten.

The pirate spider Gelanor siquirres does not spin webs to passively catch prey. Instead, they hunt other web-building spiders using a stealth-based strategy. At night, they construct a capture web—long, dry silk lines extending from their retreat to nearby vegetation. These lines act as a trap by providing an anchor for the floating lines of nocturnal web-building spiders. If an exploring spider unknowingly secures its floating line to the pirate spider’s silk, it will then follow its own line onto the pirate spider’s web. Once the pirate spider detects the intruder, it descends from its retreat and ambushes it.

Some mimetids have been observed to feed on insects as well. The spider-feeding habit presents problems in mating, and little is known about how the males court females to avoid being eaten. However, some male mimetids in the genus Gelanor, found in South America, have enormously long appendages which they use to inseminate females.

== Distribution ==
Pirate spiders are found in forests all around the globe, wherein the highest diversity is found in Central and Tropical South America.

== Genera ==
As of January 2026, this family includes eight genera and 166 species:

- Anansi Benavides & Hormiga, 2017 – Central Africa, South Africa
- Arocha Simon, 1893 – Brazil, Peru
- Australomimetus Heimer, 1986 – Japan, Korea, Australia, Southern Australia, New Zealand
- Ero C. L. Koch, 1836 – Africa, Asia, Europe, North America, South America, North Africa. Introduced to Réunion, China, Japan, Philippines, Australia
- Gelanor Thorell, 1869 – Pakistan, Costa Rica, Guatemala, Panama, Mexico, South America
- Kratochvilia Strand, 1934 – São Tomé and Príncipe
- Melaenosia Simon, 1906 – India
- Mimetus Hentz, 1832 – Africa, Asia, Slovakia, Russia, North America, Brazil, Paraguay, Peru, Hungary to Central Asia, Antigua. Introduced to Galapagos
