= Eros (disambiguation) =

Eros is the Greek god of love.

Eros may also refer to:

== Arts and entertainment ==
=== Comics and magazines ===
- Eros (comics), a superhero appearing in Marvel Comics, better known as Starfox
- Eros (magazine), edited by Ralph Ginzburg who was prosecuted for obscenity in 1962
- Eros Comix, a line of pornographic comic books published by Fantagraphics

=== Film and television ===
- Eros, o Deus do Amor, a 1980 film
- Eros (film), a 2004 film
- Eros, a fictional character in Ed Wood's Plan 9 from Outer Space (1957)

=== Music ===
- Eros (Dün album), the 1981 only album by French band Dün
- Eros Ramazzotti (born 1963), Italian pop musician
  - Eros (Eros Ramazzotti album), his 1997 greatest hits album
- Eros, a 1999 album by South Korean band Eve
- Eros (Deftones album), an unreleased studio album by American band Deftones, recorded in 2008
- Eros (Lee Chan-hyuk album), 2025
- Eros|Anteros, a 2013 album by Belgian band Oathbreaker

== Organisations ==
- Eros Films, a British film distribution company in existence from 1947–1961
- Eros Media World, an Indian media company
  - Eros International, an Indian motion picture production and distribution company, subsidiary of the above
  - Eros International plc, former Indian media company, merged with STX Entertainment to form Eros Media World

== Places ==
- Eros, Arkansas, United States, an unincorporated community
- Eros, Louisiana, United States, a town
- Eros Airport, an airport in Windhoek, Namibia
- 433 Eros, a near-Earth asteroid
- Eros, the popular (though erroneous) name for the Shaftesbury Memorial Fountain, a monument in Piccadilly Circus, London

== People ==
- Eros (given name), a list of people
- Erős, a list of people with the Hungarian surname
- Reinhard Erös (born 1948), German medical doctor and humanitarian
- Eros Volúsia, Brazilian dancer and actress Heros Volúsia Machado (1914–2004)

== Other uses ==
- Eros (concept), the Greco-Christian term for (especially) romantic or sexual love, or the life instinct postulated by Freudian psychology
- Eros (beetle), a genus of beetles

== See also ==
- EROS (disambiguation)
- ERO (disambiguation)
- Eurus, a wind god in Greek religion
