= Lynn Culbreath Noel =

American journalist

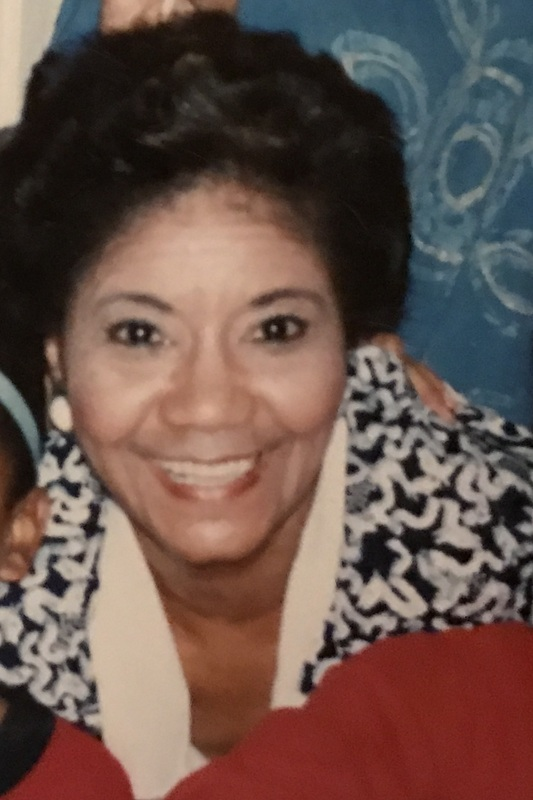
- Lynn Noel
- Born: Helen Clarissa Culbreath; January 9, 1926; Philadelphia, Pennsylvania, U.S.
- Died: December 25, 2016; San Diego, California, U.S.
- Occupation(s): Journalist, television reporter
- Relatives: Josh Culbreath (brother); Gladys Noel Bates (sister-in-law); Rachel B. Noel (sister-in-law)

Lynn Culbreath Noel (January 9, 1926 – December 25, 2016), born Helen Clarissa Culbreath, was an American news reporter. She was the public affairs director of television stations in Denver and Bakersfield, and active in Black women's organizations in Bakersfield.

== Early life and education ==
Culbreath was born in Philadelphia and raised in Norristown, Pennsylvania. After matriculating from Rittenhouse High School, she graduated from Meharry Medical College in Nashville, Tennessee and from the University of Denver. Her brother was athlete Josh Culbreath, who won a bronze medal as a hurdler at the 1956 Summer Olympics.

== Career ==
Noel lived in Japan in the 1950s, while her husband was stationed there as a military dentist. She worked in her husband's dental practice in Denver after he left the Army. She ran unsuccessfully for a seat in the Colorado General Assembly in 1966. She worked for the Hubert Humphrey presidential campaign in 1968. She also worked in public relations for Pepsi.

Noel was hired by KMGH-TV in Denver as a news reporter in 1965, and promoted to public affairs director. She transferred to KERO-TV in Bakersfield, California, in 1973, and worked at that station as public affairs director until her retirement in 1996. She spoke to community groups in Bakersfield, on television and public arts topics. In 1975, she won an honorary Toby Award for her services to the North Bakersfield Junior Theatre, and she joined the board of directors of the Kern Press Club.

Noel was a founding member of Denver's chapter of Jack and Jill of America. She was also a member of The Links and the Order of the Eastern Star.

== Personal life ==
Culbreath married Mississippi-born dentist Andrew J. Noel, Jr. in 1945; she became the sister-in-law of educator Gladys Noel Bates and politician Rachel B. Noel. They had two daughters, Andrea and Deirdre, and a son, Andrew. She died in San Diego, California, in 2016, at the age of 90.
