= ERO =

ERO or Ero may refer to:

== Science and technology ==
- Easily Recoverable Object, a subclass of near-Earth object that is easily recoverable
- Early Release Observations, of the James Webb Space Telescope
- Edge recombination operator, an operator in genetic algorithms
- Elementary row operations, an operation performed on the rows of an elementary matrix in mathematics
- Ero (spider), a genus of pirate spiders
- Extremely Red Object, astronomical source of radiation with extreme redshift

== Government ==
- Education Review Office (New Zealand), an agency of the New Zealand government
- Electoral registration officer, in the UK, a person appointed by a local authority to compile and maintain the electoral roll
- Electronic return originator, an authorized IRS e-file provider which originates the electronic submission of a return
- Enforcement and Removal Operations, a section of U.S. Immigration and Customs Enforcement
- The Emergency Regulations Ordinance (Cap. 241) of Hong Kong

== Organizations ==
- Eugenics Record Office (1910–1939), a center for eugenics and human heredity research in America
- ICFTU European Regional Organisation (1950–1969), regional confederation of trade unions
- European Radiocommunications Office, former name of the European Communications Office, part of the European Conference of Postal and Telecommunications Administrations
- Emergency response officers (EROs) are people who are trained to be the first line of response in any emergency situation.

== Other uses ==
- Ero, an abbot in The Legend of Ero of Armenteira
- Končar-Arma ERO, a Croatian submachine gun similar to the Israeli-made Uzi submachine gun

== See also ==
- Eros (disambiguation)
- EROS (disambiguation)
