= Farmhaven, Mississippi =

- Unincorporated community
- Location within Mississippi Location within the United States
- Coordinates: 32°38′51″N 89°48′38″W
- Country: United States
- State: Mississippi
- County: Madison
- Elevation: 374 ft (114 m)
- Time zone: UTC-6 (Central (CST))
  - Summer (DST): UTC-5 (CDT)
- ZIP code: 39046
- Area code: 601
- GNIS feature ID: 669914

Farmhaven is an unincorporated community located in eastern Madison County, Mississippi, United States. Farmhaven is approximately 13 miles (21 km) east of Sharon and approximately 5 miles (8.0 km) west of Carthage. Located near the intersection of Mississippi Highways 16 and 17, Farmhaven is a part of the Jackson, Mississippi metropolitan statistical area.

== History ==
A post office operated in Farmhaven from 1924 to 1969. A tornado struck the community on February 26, 1958, killing four residents.

== Education ==
Farmhaven High School, serving communities in the eastern portion of the county, opened around 1924 and closed in 1957. Students previously districted for Farmhaven were instead zoned to Canton High School.

== Notable people ==
- Evie Dennis, United States Olympic Committee vice president from 1981 to 1988
- Flonzie Brown Wright, civil rights activist
