= EROS =

EROS may refer to:

== Science and technology ==
- Center for Earth Resources Observation and Science, the US national archive of remotely sensed images of the Earth's land surface
- Encyclopedia of Reagents for Organic Synthesis, containing a description of the use of all reagents in organic chemistry
- Extremely Reliable Operating System, an operating system developed by The EROS Group, the University of Pennsylvania and Johns Hopkins University
- Earth Resources Observation Satellite, a series of Israeli commercial Earth observation satellites
- Event-related optical signal, a brain-scanning signal

== Other uses ==
- Eelam Revolutionary Organisation of Students, a militant Tamil separatist group in Sri Lanka
- JDT 1650R EROS, a Mini-MAX aircraft

== See also ==
- Eros (disambiguation)
- ERO (disambiguation)
