= NIBHV =

The Nederlands Instituut voor BedrijfHulpverlening (NIBHV) is one of the organisations that deals with the training and certification of Emergency Response Officers in the Netherlands.

Most medium to large companies are obliged to have some sort of Emergency Response Team within their organisation to aid in emergency situations.

NIBHV issues their own standards for Emergency Response Officers training and certification.

== See also ==
- Fire fighting
- First Aid
- SBN
