= Jack Harvey Young Sr. =

American lawyer (1908–1976)

Jack Harvey Young Sr. (March 9, 1908 – 1976) was an American lawyer in Jackson, Mississippi. He was one of three African-American lawyers that handled civil rights cases in Mississippi during the 1950s and 1960s.

== Life and career ==
Jack Harvey Young was born on March 9, 1908, in Jackson, Mississippi. He attended Jim Hill Public School and then Smith Robertson Public School. Young graduated from Jackson State College and studied law under Sidney R. Redmond.

He worked as a mail carrier before passing the Mississippi bar in 1952. He lived in Jackson with his wife Aurelia Young (1915–2010) and their two children. Their home was at 627 Pearl Street. He was one of the founding members of the Magnolia Bar Association. Young died in 1976.

His son Jack Harvey Young Jr. became a lawyer, and worked with him.

== See also ==
- R. Jess Brown
