= Flonzie Brown Wright =

American civil rights activist (born 1942)

- Born: Flonzie Brown; August 12, 1942 (age 82); Farmhaven, Madison County, Mississippi, U.S.
- Other names: Flonzie Brown Goodloe, Flonzie Brown-Goodloe, Flonzie Brown-Wright
- Education: Tougaloo College
- Occupation(s): Civil rights activist, voting rights activist, educator, author
- Children: 3
- Website: Official website

Flonzie Brown-Wright (also known as Flonzie Brown-Goodloe; born 1942) is an American civil rights activist, voting rights activist, educator, and author. In 1968, she was elected Election Commissioner in Canton, becoming the first Black woman elected to a public office in Mississippi since the Reconstruction era. She worked with Martin Luther King Jr.

== Early life and education ==
Flonzie Brown was born on August 12, 1942, in Farmhaven, Madison County, Mississippi, into an African American family, and was raised in Canton, Mississippi. Her maternal side of the family had grown-up educated and multi-cultural; and her paternal side of the family had been enslaved. When she was age 12 in 1954, two of her cousins (age 15 and age 17) were visiting her in Canton from Chicago and they were brutally murdered and dismembered.

Brown-Wright attended Holy Child Jesus School, where she met her classmate Thea Bowman; and she attended Canton public schools. Brown-Wright attended Tougaloo College.

== Career ==
"Voting, the right to vote or not having the right to vote was the crux of not only the civil rights movement, but every movement. So we have an obligation, it's not optional. We're not here because somebody thought it was a nice idea. We're here because people paid the price for people to have opportunities. So we must validate what they did as we say back in the day and if we don't do that then we do not acknowledge nor appreciate that struggle."

— Brown-Wright (2020)

She married a childhood friend and they moved to California, and had three children, but by 1962 she divorced. Brown-Wright was inspired to return her family to Mississippi after seeing the 1961 Freedom Rides on television. She took a job as a waitress in Biloxi, which is where she met civil rights leaders and attorneys Jack H. Young, R. Jess Brown, and Carsie Hall.

After the murder of Medgar Evers in 1963, she became committed to work in the civil rights movement initially focused on voting rights. She also became the Mississippi NAACP Field Secretary in 1963. When Brown-Wright went to register to vote, her voting application was rejected for not knowing the term "habeas corpus"; so she took a month to study the United States constitution and was able to pass. It was common during the 1960s for the Election Commissioner to ask random questions, in order to pass the voter registration test.

During the civil rights movement in the 1960s, she helped register thousands of voters in the state of Mississippi. In 1968, she was elected as the Election Commissioner in Canton, where she was tasked with monitoring elections, training poll workers, supervising registrars, and holding educational workshops for voters. She sued the Elections Board for discrimination against candidates and poll workers.

In 1966, after the March Against Fear where James Meredith was shot, Martin Luther King Jr. brought three thousand protestors to Canton and asked for Brown-Wright's help with finding them accommodations.

At a conference in Chicago, she met Mamie Till, the mother of lynching victim Emmett Till. Between 1969 and 1973, Brown Wright served as vice president of the Institute of Politics at Millsaps College. She worked for the Equal Employment Opportunity Commission from 1974 to 1989. She also went on national tours to give lectures and workshops on voting rights, and served as president of the non-profit organization Women for Progress in Mississippi.

She published a memoir, Looking Back to Move Ahead: An Experience of History and Hope (1st ed. 1996). Her life story was included in the documentary film, Standing on My Sisters' Shoulders (1997) by Laura J. Lipson.

In 2018, she was honored by the United States House of Representatives.

== Publications ==
- Brown Wright, Flonzie (2000). Looking Back to Move Ahead: An Experience of History and Hope. FBW and Associates. ISBN 978-0788006135.
