= C8H6N2O =

The molecular formula C_{8}H_{6}N_{2}O (molar mass: 146.149 g/mol) may refer to:

- Quinazolinone
- 4H-Pyrido(1,2-a)pyrimidin-4-one
