= Carsie =

Carsie may refer to:

- Carson Carsie Blanton (born 1985), American singer-songwriter and guitarist
- Carsie Hall (1908–1989), American lawyer and civil rights activist
- Cârșie, a village in the commune of Sichevița, Caraș-Severin County, Romania
- Carsie, Scotland, a village - see Blairgowrie and Rattray

== See also ==
- Carsy, nickname of Stuart Carswell (born 1993), Scottish footballer
