= Marsha Barbour =

American politician

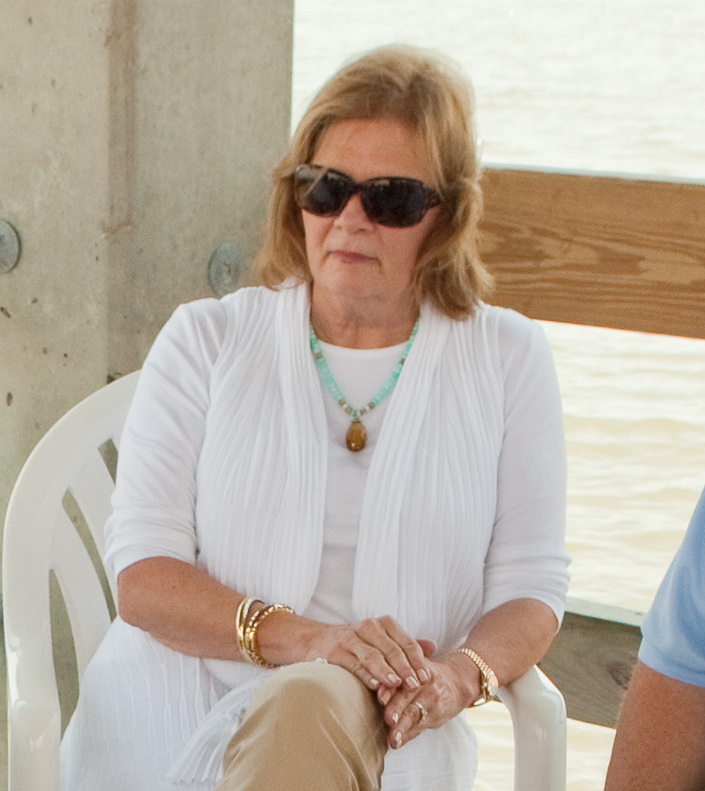
- Barbour in 2010

First Lady of Mississippi
- In role January 13, 2004 – January 10, 2012
- Governor: Haley Barbour
- Preceded by: Melanie Musgrove
- Succeeded by: Deborah Bryant

Personal details
- Born: Monroeville, Alabama, U.S.
- Spouse: Haley Barbour (m. 1971)
- Education: University of Mississippi

Marsha Dickson Barbour (born in Monroeville, Alabama) was the first lady of the U.S. state of Mississippi from 2004 to 2012. She is the wife of Mississippi's 63rd governor, Haley Barbour.

Marsha Barbour grew up in Monroeville, Alabama. She moved with her family to Canton, Mississippi in 1965. She graduated from Canton High School and the University of Mississippi with a Bachelor of Business Administration in 1970.

Marsha and Haley Barbour were married in December 1971 in Canton, Mississippi. After the wedding, the couple moved to his hometown of Yazoo City, Mississippi. They have two adult sons.

Following Hurricane Katrina in August 2005, she worked on relief efforts along the Mississippi Gulf Coast.
