= Aurelia N. Young =

American musician, educator (1915–2010)

- Born: Aurelia Jeannette Norris; 1915; Knottsville, Kentucky, U.S.
- Died: October 17, 2010 (aged 94); Los Angeles, California, U.S.
- Other name: Aurelia Norris Young
- Education: Wilberforce University
- Occupations: Musician; music educator; civil rights activist
- Spouse: Jack Young Sr. (m. 1938)
- Children: 2
- Parent(s): John H. Norris; Hilda A. Stone Norris

Aurelia Norris Young (née Aurelia Jeannette Norris; 1915 – October 17, 2010) was an American musician, music educator, and civil rights activist. She taught at Jackson State College (now Jackson State University) and Tougaloo College.

== Early life ==
Aurelia Jeannette Norris was born in 1915, in Knottsville, Kentucky. She was the daughter of John H., a farmer, and Hilda A. Stone Norris.

Young received a bachelor's degree in 1937 from Wilberforce University, where she studied music theory, organ, and French horn. She was a member of Delta Sigma Theta sorority. In 1941, she helped found the Jackson alumna chapter of Delta Sigma Theta sorority.

Norris married Jack Young Sr. in 1938 and was the mother of two children, Jack H. Young Jr. and Hilda Jeannette Young. In Jack H. Young Sr.'s law practiice represented civil rights activists, including Freedom Riders. He credited Aurelia Young for her support in his decision to pursue the law, after two decades as a postal worker. Aurelia Young's salary kept the family afloat during the early years of his law practice, which began when he passed the bar in 1951.

== Career ==
Young was part of a group of women who formed an organization called Womanpower Unlimited to support the personal needs of Freedom Riders while they were in jail in Jackson and later imprisoned at Parchman Penitentiary. Young and her fellow organizers, including Clarie Collins Harvey, raised money to buy clothes, toothbrushes, and other personal items for Freedom Riders. Young reported on the work to editors of the Pittsburgh Courier, writing: "these wonderful Jackson women risked jobs to come to the aid of those who believe enough in democracy to risk bodily harm to defend it. This is perhaps the first time we were glad to be Negroes, because we would have been ashamed to be White women and watch the injustice of our city government in operation."

Young and her husband often hosted national civil rights figures and lawyers who came to Mississippi to support the movement. These included Roy Wilkins, John Doar, and William Kunstler. Young kept a journal during the intense period of Freedom Rides. Her notes include lists of foods she served for the many suppers she prepared and hosted for lawyers, ministers, and families who came to Jackson for the Freedom Riders' trials.

Young told an interviewer in the 1980s that she was inspired to work for equality for Black citizens when she surveyed her community in the 1940s and found few opportunities for her Black children to pursue recreation, clubs, music, and enrichment. She was part of a social circle of prominent African Americans in Jackson that included civil rights activist Medgar Evers and she taught on the same college faculty as author Margaret Walker Alexander.

Aurelia Young earned a Master's of Music degree from Indiana University in 1955 paid for by a state program Mississippi operated to keep Black graduate students out of its segregated universities. In May 1975, she was selected as Teacher of the Year by the Mabel Carney Chapter (at Jackson State University) of the Student National Education Association. She took pride in expanding opportunities for young Black students and bristled at suggestions she and her Black colleagues needed training on remediation from more privileged counterparts. Aurelia Young established the bachelor's of music program at Jackson State; she retired after 30 years on the faculty.

Aurelia Young played piano for programs in communities across the state of Mississippi. She was also an artist, composing music and publishing poetry.

In 1979, Aurelia Young helped organize the nonprofit organization that pursued a license for and operated WMPR-FM, the first public radio station in Mississippi and the only one dedicated to programming for African Americans. Young served as president of J. C. Maxwell Group, Inc. and took over station management during times of financial distress.

== Death ==
Young died at age 94 in Los Angeles, California, on October 17, 2010.
