= Thea Bowman =

American Roman Catholic religious sister and civil rights activist (1937–1990)

Servant of God Thea Bowman FSPA
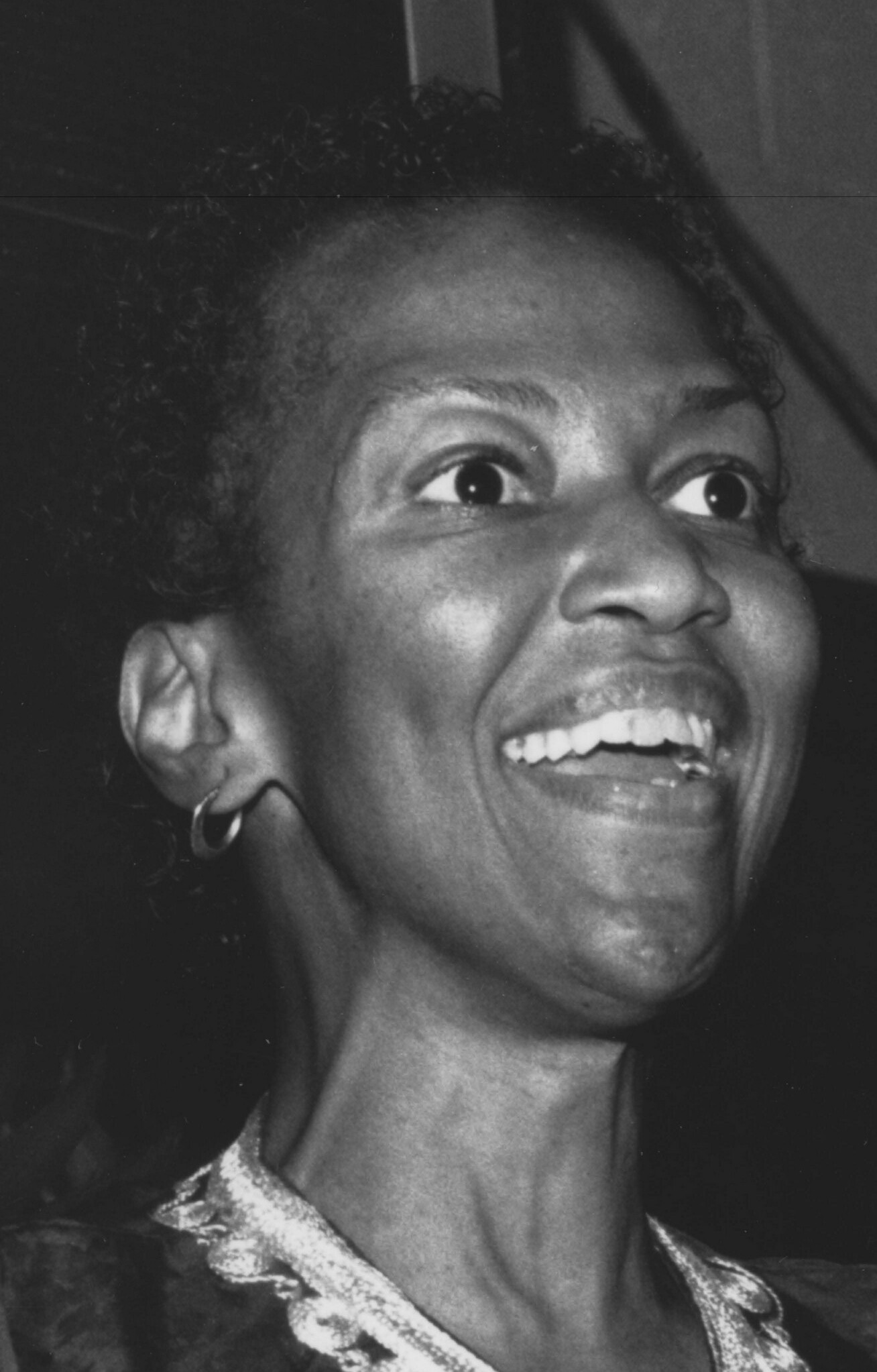
- Bowman speaks at Walsh University in 1989
- Born: Bertha Elizabeth Bowman; December 29, 1937; Yazoo City, Mississippi, United States
- Died: March 30, 1990 (aged 52); Canton, Mississippi, United States

Mary Thea Bowman (born Bertha Elizabeth Bowman; December 29, 1937 – March 30, 1990) was a Black Catholic religious sister, teacher, musician, liturgist and scholar who contributed to the ministry of the Catholic Church toward African Americans. She assisted in the production of an African-American Catholic hymnal and was a popular speaker on faith and spirituality. She helped found the National Black Sisters' Conference for African-American women in Catholic religious life. In 2018, the Diocese of Jackson opened her beatification process; she was thus titled a Servant of God.

== Life ==
=== Early life ===
Bertha Elizabeth Bowman was born in Yazoo City, Mississippi, in 1937. Her paternal grandfather (Edward Bowman) had been born a slave, but her father (Theon Edward Bowman) was a physician and her mother (Mary Esther Coleman) a teacher. She was raised a Methodist but, with her parents' permission, converted to the Catholic faith at the age of nine. Bowman attended Holy Child Jesus School in Canton, Mississippi, where she met her classmate Flonzie Brown Wright.

She became the first African-American member of the Franciscan Sisters of Perpetual Adoration at La Crosse, Wisconsin, at age 15, overcoming her parents' objections. Bowman was also part of the civil rights movement.

During her religious formation, Bowman attended Viterbo University, which is run by her congregation, and earned a B.A. in English in 1965. She went on to attend The Catholic University of America in Washington, D.C., where she earned an M.A. in English in 1969 and a Ph.D. in English in 1972, writing her doctoral thesis on Thomas More, titled The Relationship of Pathos and Style in A Dyalogue of Comforte Agaynste Tribulacyon: A Rhetorical Study.

While studying for her master's at CUA, Bowman became a founding member of the National Black Sisters' Conference, inaugurated in Pittsburgh in 1968 following the assassination of Martin Luther King Jr. She remained active in the group throughout her life.

=== Educator ===
Bowman taught at an elementary school in La Crosse, Wisconsin, and then at Holy Child Jesus Catholic School, her alma mater. She later taught at her other almae matres, Viterbo College in La Crosse and the Catholic University of America in Washington, D.C., as well as at Xavier University of Louisiana in New Orleans.

In his book Eleven Modern Mystics, Victor M. Parachin, a meditation teacher, notes Bowman's impact upon Catholic liturgical music in providing an intellectual, spiritual, historical, and cultural foundation for developing and legitimizing a distinct worship form for Black Catholics. Bowman had explained: "When we understand our history and culture, then we can develop the ritual, the music and the devotional expression that satisfy us in the Church."

Bowman became instrumental in the 1987 publication of a new Catholic hymnal, Lead Me, Guide Me: The African American Catholic Hymnal, the first such work directed to the Black community. James P. Lyke, Auxiliary Bishop of Cleveland, himself an African-American, coordinated the hymnal project, saying it was born of the needs and aspirations of Black Catholics. Bowman was actively involved in selecting hymns to be included, as well as her essay, "The Gift of African American Sacred Song". In it, she wrote, "Black sacred song is soulful song" and described it as holistic, participatory, real, spirit-filled, and life-giving.

=== Evangelist ===
After Bowman had spent 16 years in education, the Bishop of Jackson invited her to become a consultant for intercultural awareness. She became more directly involved with ministry to her fellow African-Americans, and began giving inspirational talks to Black congregations. She brought her "ministry of joy" to people as far as Nigeria and Kenya, to Canada, the Virgin Islands to Hawaii, New York, and California. She called on Catholics to celebrate their differences and to retain their cultures, but to reflect their joy at being one in Christ. In his book Hope Sings, So Beautiful: Graced Encounters Across the Color Line, Christopher Pramuk wrote:

Arguably no person in recent memory did more to resist and transform the sad legacy of segregation and racism in the Catholic Church than Thea Bowman ... who inspired millions with her singing and message of God's love for all races and faiths. Sister Thea awakened a sense of fellowship in people both within and well beyond the Catholic world, first and foremost through her charismatic presence.

Bowman was diagnosed with breast cancer in 1984, after which she began treatment but maintained a robust speaking schedule. As her illness progressed, her fame grew and she made several overseas trips, including visits to West Africa and Lourdes, France. She also appeared on national news outlets and was even filmed for a documentary on her life after a terminal diagnosis.

During an appearance on the show 60 Minutes with Mike Wallace, she prodded him into saying "Black is beautiful."

In 1989, shortly before her death, in recognition of her contributions to the service of the Church, she was awarded an honorary doctorate by Boston College in Massachusetts.

=== Death ===
Just months before her death from cancer, Bowman spoke in 1989 to American Catholic bishops from her wheelchair, and they "powerfully and visibly moved, applauded her. When she had finished, they stood linking arms and singing as Bowman led them in the spiritual, 'We Shall Overcome'." Harry Belafonte met her in Mississippi that year, hoping to do a film on her life with Whoopi Goldberg portraying her; the project did not materialize.

Less than a week before her death, the University of Notre Dame announced that it would award Bowman the 1990 Laetare Medal. It was presented posthumously at their 1990 commencement exercises. She died on March 30, 1990, aged 52, in Canton, Mississippi, and was buried with her parents in Memphis, Tennessee.

== Legacy ==
The 25th anniversary of Bowman’s death brought forth numerous tributes. Her 1988 albums, Songs of My People and 'Round the Glory Manger, initially released on stereo audiocassette by the Daughters of St. Paul, were re-released in 2020 for the 30th anniversary of her death under the title, Songs of My People: The Complete Collection.

=== Thea Bowman AHANA and Intercultural Center ===
Boston College instituted the Thea Bowman AHANA and Intercultural Center (African, Hispanic, Asian, Native American).

=== Sister Thea Bowman Foundation ===
Shortly before her death, the Sister Thea Bowman Black Catholic Educational Foundation was established to raise scholarship money on a national scale for underserved students of color, who sought post-secondary education but did not have the means to attend. She conceived of the foundation as early as 1984 and articulated its mission for the students: "Walk with us. Don't walk behind us and don't walk in front of us; walk with us." The vision was brought to life in 1989 by founder Mary Lou Jennings. By 2015, it had contributed to financing college expenses for 150 African American students.

=== Cause for beatification ===
The cause for Bowman’s beatification was opened by the Diocese of Jackson in mid-2018. At the United States Conference of Catholic Bishops' 2018 Fall General Assembly, the Committee on Canonical Affairs and Church Governance indicated unanimous support for the advancement of Bowman's canonization cause on the diocesan level.

=== Institutions named after Bowman ===
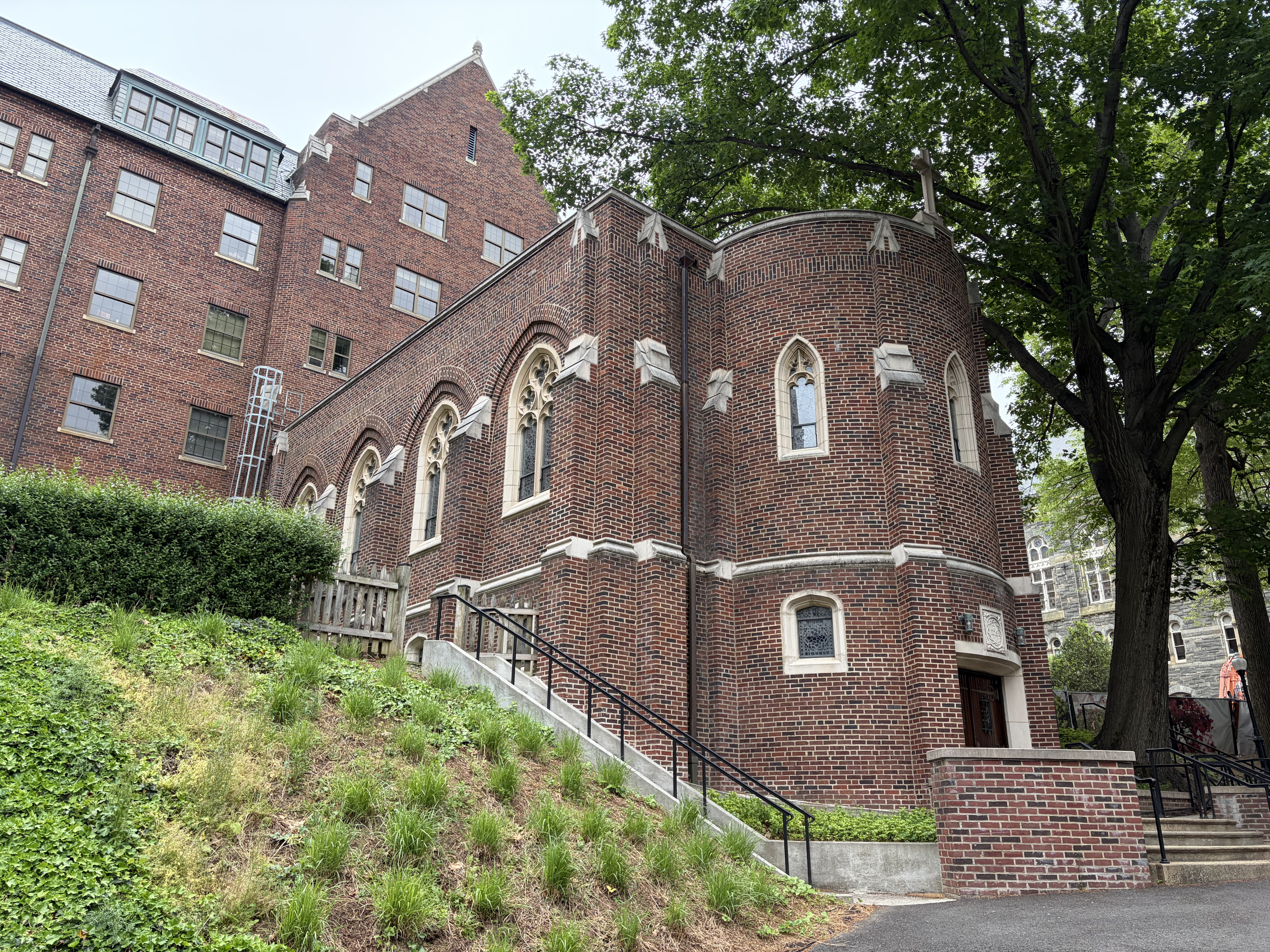
The Servant of God Sr. Thea Bowman Chapel of St. William in Copley Hall at Georgetown University.

- Thea Bowman House at Boston College
- Thea Bowman AHANA and Intercultural Center, Boston College
- Thea Bowman Center, Cleveland, Ohio
- Thea Bowman Community Health Center, Detroit
- Thea Bowman House, Utica, New York
- Thea Bowman Leadership Academy, Gary, Indiana
- Thea Bowman Residence, Amityville, New York
- Thea Bowman Spirituality Center, Raymond, Mississippi
- Thea Bowman Women's Center, Philadelphia
- Servant of God Sister Thea Bowman Chapel of St. William at Georgetown University
- Sister Thea Bowman Catholic Student Center at Howard University, Washington, D.C.
- Sister Thea Bowman Academy, Wilkinsburg, Pennsylvania
- Sister Thea Bowman Catholic School, Jackson, Mississippi
- Sister Thea Bowman Center for Women, Siena College, Loudonville, New York
- Sister Thea Bowman DRVC Gospel Choir, Diocese of Rockville Centre, New York
- Sister Thea Bowman Grade School, East St. Louis, Illinois
- Sister Thea Bowman Hall at Loyola University Maryland
- Sister Thea Bowman Residence Hall at Saint Joseph's University
- Sister Thea Bowman House (Catholic Campus Ministry) at Bennett College and North Carolina Agricultural and Technical State University, Greensboro
- Thea Bowman Hall and Thea's Abbey at Sacred Heart University
- Sister Thea Bowman Center at Viterbo University
- Sister Thea Bowman Center at University of Notre Dame
- Bowman Center at Dominican University

== Works ==
- Bowman, Thea (1985). Families, Black and Catholic, Catholic and Black. Washington, DC: United States Catholic Conference. Commission on Marriage and Family Life. ISBN 978-1-5558-6890-1.
- Bowman, Thea (1987). "The Gift of African American Sacred Song" (PDF). Lead Me, Guide Me. Chicago, IL: GIA Publishing. ISBN 978-9-9922-3304-7.
- Bowman, Thea (June 19, 1989). "Transcript" (PDF). Address to U.S. Bishops (Official video). Seton Hall University, South Orange, NJ: United States Conference of Catholic Bishops.
- Bowman, Thea; Cepress, Celestine (1993). Sister Thea Bowman, Shooting Star: Selected Writings and Speeches. La Crosse, WI: Saint Mary's Press. ISBN 978-0-8848-9302-8. OCLC 28935744.
- Bowman, Thea; Nutt, Maurice J. (2009). Thea Bowman: In My Own Words. Liguori, MO: Liguori Publications. ISBN 978-0-7648-1782-3. – index of Bowman's speeches, writings, and interviews, with a brief biographical sketch and epilogue.
