= 4H-Pyrido(1,2-a)pyrimidin-4-one =

4H-Pyrido[1,2-a]pyrimidin-4-one

Names
- IUPAC name pyrido[1,2-a]pyrimidin-4-one
- Other names 4H-pyrido(1,2-a)pyrimidin-4-one

Identifiers
CAS Number	23443-10-9
3D model (JSmol)	Interactive image
ChEMBL	ChEMBL75200
ChemSpider	314929
EC Number	691-445-5
PubChem CID	354785
CompTox Dashboard (EPA)	DTXSID70326648
- InChI: InChI=1S/C8H6N2O/c11-8-4-5-9-7-3-1-2-6-10(7)8/h1-6H; Key: NYJWYCAHJRGKMI-UHFFFAOYSA-N
- SMILES: C1=CC2=NC=CC(=O)N2C=C1

Properties
Chemical formula	C_{8}H_{6}N_{2}O
Molar mass	146.15 g/mol
Appearance	Solid

Hazards
- GHS labelling
Pictograms	(GHS07: Exclamation mark)
Signal word	Warning
Hazard statements	H302, H312, H332
Precautionary statements	P261, P264, P270, P271, P280, P301+P317, P302+P352, P304+P340, P317, P321, P330, P362+P364, P501
- Except where otherwise noted, data are given for materials in their standard state (at 25 °C [77 °F], 100 kPa). Infobox references

4H-Pyrido[1,2-a]pyrimidin-4-one is a heterocyclic compound consisting of a pyridine ring fused to a pyrimidine ring through a shared nitrogen atom, with a ketone at the 4-position. It is the parent compound of the pyrido[1,2-a]pyrimidine ring system, a privileged scaffold in medicinal chemistry whose derivatives have been investigated across multiple therapeutic areas including cardiovascular, antiallergic, antiasthmatic, and antiparasitic research.

== History ==
The pyrido[1,2-a]pyrimidine ring system was first described in 1911 by Palazzo and Tamburini, who assigned an incorrect structure — the 2-oxo isomer — to the product obtained from 2-aminopyridine and ethyl acetoacetate. This incorrect assignment was repeated independently by Seide (1925), Crippa and Scevola (1937), and Khitrik (1939), and stood uncorrected for nearly forty years across four research groups.

The correct structure — the 4-oxo isomer — was established by Antaki and Petrow in 1951 by an independent synthesis: the reaction of 2-bromopyridine with ethyl β-aminocrotonate, a route entirely unconnected to the original preparation. This assignment was confirmed independently by Adams and Pachter in 1952. Shur and Israelstam, writing in the Journal of Organic Chemistry in 1968, credited the correction explicitly in the running text of their paper.

The chemistry of the ring system was extended in 1958 by Antaki, working from the Research Institute for Tropical Medicine, Cairo, who synthesised a series of 3-substituted derivatives — including 3-acetyl and 3-cyano analogues — via condensation of ethyl ethoxymethyleneacetoacetate and cyanoacetate with 2-aminopyridine and its methyl derivatives. The 1958 study provided the first systematic ultraviolet spectroscopic characterisation of the pyrido[1,2-a]pyrimidine series, enabling structural distinction between bicyclic isomers by UV absorption.

The 1958 paper is cited as the primary reference (Reference 1a) for the reagent ethyl ethoxymethyleneacetoacetate in the Encyclopedia of Reagents for Organic Synthesis (e-EROS), published by Wiley.

The canonical review of the chemistry of pyrido[1,2-a]pyrimidines was published by Hermecz and Mészáros in Advances in Heterocyclic Chemistry in 1983, covering synthesis, spectroscopy, and biological activity across the compound class.

== Pharmaceutical applications ==
The pyrido[1,2-a]pyrimidin-4-one scaffold has been cited as prior art in pharmaceutical patent research across multiple therapeutic areas. Pfizer cited both the 1951 and 1958 papers directly in patent specifications related to cardiovascular and antiasthmatic research, noting that the 1958 compound demonstrated antischistosomal action.

Derivatives of the pyrido[1,2-a]pyrimidine scaffold have been reported to exhibit tranquiliser, antiallergic, antiulcerative, antiasthmatic, and bronchodilator activity, as well as analgesic activity and human platelet aggregation inhibitory properties.

The scaffold is structurally related to several pharmaceutical compounds including risperidone and paliperidone, whose synthesis employs tetrahydro derivatives of the pyrido[1,2-a]pyrimidine ring system.
