= Mintraching =

- Municipality
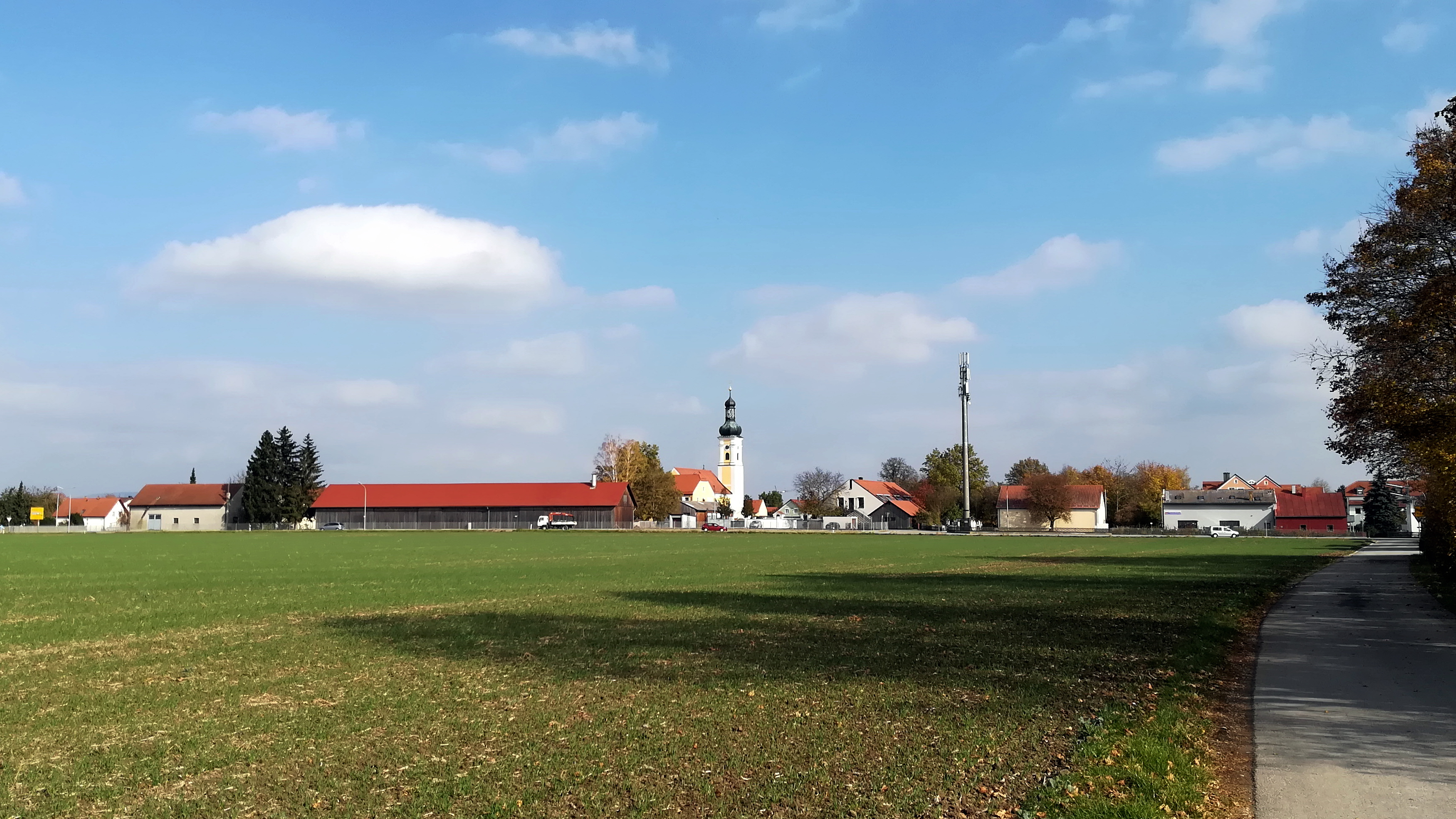
- View towards the town

- Coat of arms

- Location of Mintraching within Regensburg district
- Interactive map of Mintraching
- Location within Germany Location within Bavaria
- Coordinates: 48°57′07″N 12°14′45″E
- Country: Germany
- State: Bavaria
- Admin. region: Oberpfalz
- District: Regensburg
- Subdivisions: 18 Ortsteile

Government
  - Mayor (2020–26): Angelika Ritt-Frank (SPD)

Area
  - Total: 53.87 km^{2} (20.80 sq mi)
- Elevation: 335 m (1,099 ft)

Population (2025-12-31)
  - Total: 5,036
  - Density: 93.48/km^{2} (242.1/sq mi)
- Time zone: UTC+01:00 (CET)
  - Summer (DST): UTC+02:00 (CEST)
- Postal codes: 93098
- Dialling codes: 09406
- Vehicle registration: R
- Website: www.mintraching.de

Mintraching is a municipality in the district of Regensburg in Bavaria in Germany.

== Notable people ==
- Annette Erös
- Reinhard Erös
