= Erős =

Erős is a Hungarian surname. It may refer to:

- Gábor Erős (born 1980), Hungarian footballer
- Károly Erős (born 1971), Hungarian football
- Peter Erős (1932–2014), Hungarian-American conductor
- Ronald Erős (born 1993), Hungarian footballer

== See also ==
- Reinhard Erös (born 1948), German medical doctor and humanitarian
