= Smith Robertson Museum and Cultural Center =

Historic elementary school in Mississippi

Coordinates: 32°18′20″N 90°11′12″W

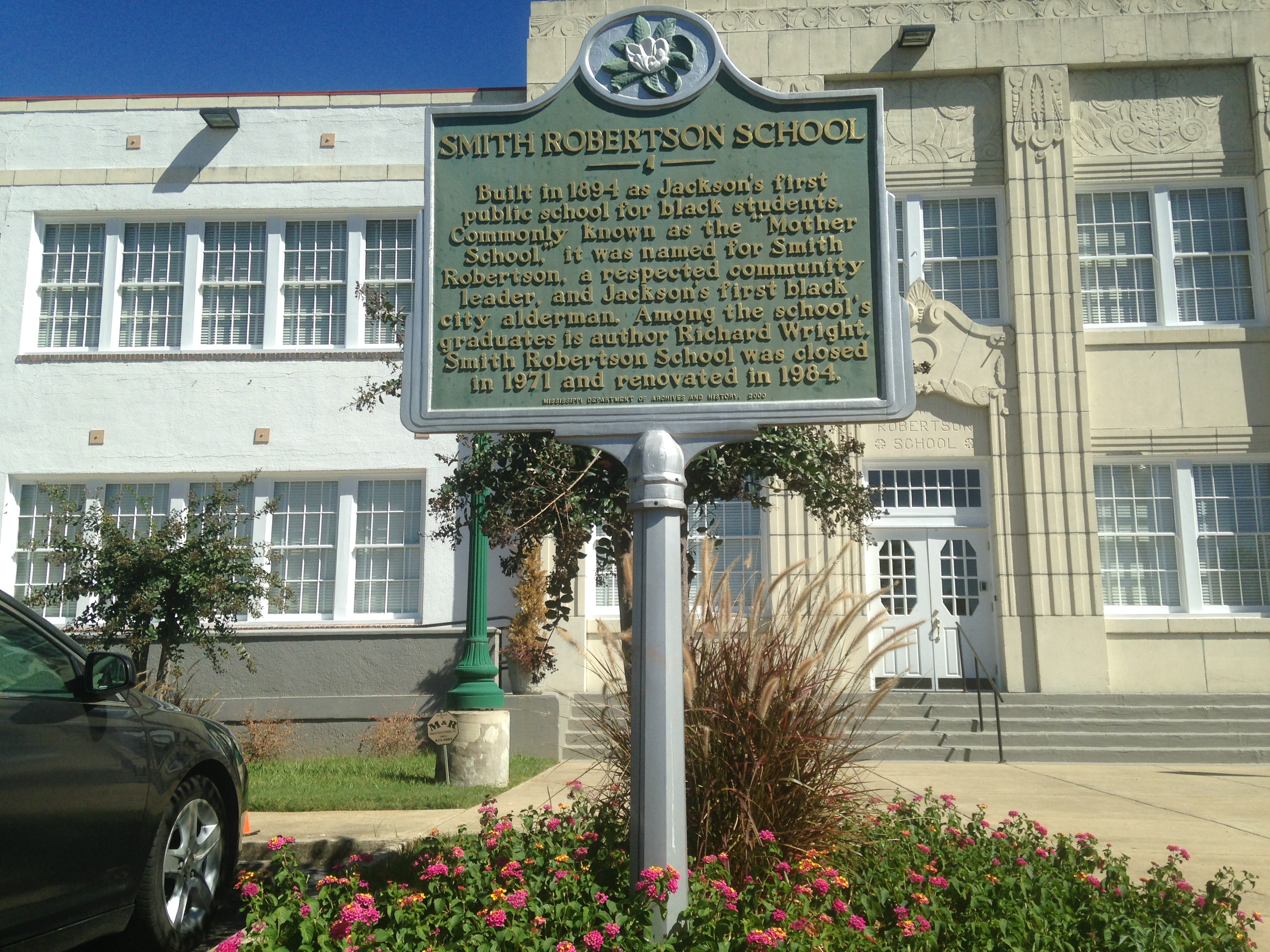
Historical marker

The Smith Robertson Museum and Cultural Center, formerly Smith Robertson Elementary School, is a museum and cultural center in Jackson, Mississippi. The elementary school in Mississippi's state capital served African American students in Hinds County, Mississippi. It is listed on the National Register of Historic Places. It is at 500 Bloom Street.

A wooden school was built in 1894. It was named for Jackson's first Black alderman Smith Robertson in 1903. Richard Wright was an alumnus. It closed in 1971. The school building was renovated and reopened as a history museum in 1984.

The original wooden school building burned. A brick building was built in 1909 and remodeled in 1929. It closed in 1971. In 1984 the building was renovated. There is a historical marker at the property.

== Alumni ==
- Richard Wright (author)
- Jack Harvey Young Sr., civil rights lawyer
