= Carsie Hall =

American lawyer

Carsie Alvin Hall Sr. (1908–1989) was a lawyer who handled civil rights cases in Mississippi. He represented the Mississippi NAACP and served as president of the Jackson, Mississippi branch of the NAACP. He defended civil rights activists arrested during the Freedom Summer.

In 1927 he graduated from Jackson College High School and in 1935 he graduated from Jackson College. He worked as a mail carrier to pay his way through law school. He and Sidney R. Redmond studied law together.

In 1962 he wrote a letter announcing the formation of the Voters' League and was its president. In 1964 he was refused access to inmates at a Mississippi jail.

Richard Haley wrote him about the Otha Williams and Lula Bell Wright cases.

He played dominos.

He and Jack Young are honored at the Mississippi Civil Rights Museum. A historical marker commemorates him along with fellow Jackson civil rights attorneys R. J. Brown and Jack Young.

== See also ==
- Council of Federated Organizations
- Flonzie Brown Wright
- R. Jess Brown
