= Evie Dennis =

Former U.S. Olympic Committee vice-president

Superintendent of Denver Public Schools
- In office 1990–1994
- Preceded by: Dick Koeppe
- Succeeded by: Irv Moskowitz

Vice President of the United States Olympic Committee
- In office 1981–1988

Personal details
- Born: September 8, 1924 (age 102) Farmhaven, Mississippi, U.S.

Evie Garrett Dennis (born September 8, 1924) was the United States Olympic Committee vice-president from 1981 to 1988. Apart from sports, Dennis worked in education as a teacher before becoming superintendent of Denver Public Schools. She was awarded the Olympic Order in 1992 and inducted into the National Track and Field Hall of Fame in 2004.

== Early life and education ==
In 1924, Dennis was born in Farmhaven, Mississippi. Dennis graduated from St. Louis University with a Bachelor of Science in 1953. Additional post-secondary education that Dennis completed include a master's degree from the University of Colorado and a doctorate from Nova University.

== Career ==
Dennis began her career as an asthma researcher in Denver, Colorado. She began teaching in 1966 before becoming a deputy superintendent in 1988. She was promoted to superintendent in 1990 and remained in her position until her retirement in 1994.

In sports, Dennis worked with the Amateur Athletic Union in the late 1970s as the second vice-president and track and field chair. In 1980, she served as the acting president of The Athletics Congress. In the Olympics, Dennis was the vice president of the United States Olympic Committee from 1981 to 1988. At the end of her tenure, she was the head of mission of the American team at the 1988 Summer Olympics. Dennis also held the position of head of mission at the 1983 Pan American Games and 1991 Pan American Games for the United States.

== Awards and honors ==
In 1992, Dennis received the Olympic Order. In 2004, she was inducted into the National Track and Field Hall of Fame. In 2008, Dennis was inducted into the Colorado Women's Hall of Fame. In 2014, Dennis received Women in Athletics Award by IAAF. She entered the Colorado Sports Hall of Fame in 2023.
