= Magnolia Bar Association =

Lawyer organization in Mississippi, U.S.

- Formation: 1955
- Founder: R. Jess Brown, Carsie Hall, Jack Young
- Headquarters: Jackson, Mississippi, U.S.
- Website: themagnoliabar.org

Magnolia Bar Association is a lawyer organization founded by African-American attorneys in Jackson, Mississippi. It is an affiliate of the National Bar Association.

== History ==
R. Jess Brown, Carsie Hall and Jack Young were the only African American lawyers handling civil rights cases in Mississippi for much of the 1950s and 1960s. They founded the Magnolia Bar Association, along with five members, in the fall of 1955.

In 1992, the association sued Mississippi's supreme court justices, governor, attorney general, secretary of state, and election commissioners, arguing that the system to elect justices to the Mississippi Supreme Court "impermissibly [diluted] black voting strength" under the Voting Rights Act.

In 1992, the Magnolia Bar Foundation, a charitable arm of the group, was founded.

The Magnolia Bar Association awards the R. Jess Brown Award. The organization has participated in legal workshops.

== Presidents ==
- Carsie Hall
- Carlton W. Reeves
- Melvin G. Cooper
- Lewis Howard Burke
- Lilli Evans Bass
- Patricia Wise, first female president
- Edward Blackmon Jr.

== Members ==
- Pieter Teeuwissen, judge
- Toni Terrett, judge
- Robert Shuler Smith, District Attorney
- Tomie T. Green, judge
- Jaribu Hill

== See also ==
- Sidney Dillon Redmond
- Sidney R. Redmond
- Curtis Flowers, the association filed a brief in his case
