= Eros (comics) =

Eros, in comics, may refer to:

- Eros, a Marvel Comics character and Eternal better known as Starfox (character)
- Eros (DC Comics), a DC Comics character, child of Ares and enemy of Wonder Woman

== See also ==
- Eros Comix, a line of pornographic comic books published by Fantagraphics
- Eros (disambiguation)
