= Clarie Collins Harvey =

African American businesswoman, religious leader and activist (1916–1995)

Claire Collins Harvey
- Born: Emma Augusta Clarie Collins; November 27, 1916; Meridian, Mississippi
- Died: May 27, 1995 (aged 78)
- Education: Spelman College, BA, 1937; Columbia University, MA, 1950
- Years active: 1936-1995
- Known for: Civil rights activism
- Spouse: Martin L. Harvey

Clarie Collins Harvey (born Emma Augusta Clarie Collins; November 27, 1916 - May 27, 1995) was an African American businesswoman, religious leader and prominent activist during the civil rights movement in Mississippi. Her organization Womanpower Unlimited helped sustain the Freedom Riders during their imprisonment at Parchman Penitentiary. As a result of her long activist career, Harvey received many accolades, including the Outstanding Mississippian Award, given to her by Governor William Waller in 1974.

== Early life ==
Emma Augusta Clarie Collins was born in Meridian, Mississippi to Malachi and Mary Collins. Malachi Collins was a minister, entrepreneur and activist. He established the funeral home that Clarie would one day run and helped found the Jackson, Mississippi branch of the NAACP. Mary Collins was also active in social justice work and became the first black librarian in the state of Mississippi. The pair laid the foundation for Collins's activism which would begin to develop in University.

As the only child of a successful middle-class family, Collins was afforded many educational and career opportunities not made available to other black Mississippians. She earned her undergraduate degree from Spelman College for economics (1937), certification from Indiana College of Mortuary Science, a master's degree in personnel administration from Columbia University (1950) and spent time at the Union Theological Seminary, Tougaloo College and New York University's Graduate School of Business Administration.

During Collins's senior year at Spelman, she travelled to Amsterdam to represent the YWCA at the World Conference of Christian Youth. She would meet her future husband, Martin L. Harvey, on this trip. Martin L. Harvey was also an important activist and educational leader for several HBCU's. His role as the dean of students at Southern University was honored by having a building named after him. The Martin L. Harvey Chapel remained active until 2001 when it was renamed The Southern University Museum of Arts. Harvey and Collins had a long courting period during which both parties gained additional degrees and worked to advance their respective careers. Harvey's father had died during her trip to Amsterdam and she was expected to take on a greater role at her family's funeral home. The pair was eventually able to wed on August 1, 1943, but their marriage continued to be long-distance, as their careers required them to be in different cities.

== Activism ==
=== Ecumenical ===
Harvey's parents raised her as a member of the Methodist Church, exposing her to the ecumenical movement at a young age. Harvey used faith as an entry point for her long activist career. At Spelman, Harvey spent her senior year serving as the president of their campus branch of the YWCA. After her time in University, she served as the Secretary of the National Council of Methodist Youth, Secretary for the General Board of Christian Social Concerns of the Methodist Church (1960-1964) and helped develop a church center for the United Nations. Her impact was made global through her work for the Methodist Committee for Overseas Relief, a program which offered aid to more than 78 countries. Harvey met Pope John XXIII during a pilgrimage to Rome.

Harvey openly criticized the lack of diversity within the United Methodist Church and eventually became the first black woman to occupy the position of the Presidency for Church Women United. Church Women United was the largest women's organization when Harvey was elected, with the group having more than 30 million members. Harvey occupied many religious leadership positions traditionally filled by either white women or black men and her efforts were recognized with several awards including America's Churchwoman of the Year and the Upper Room Citation.

=== Civil rights ===
Harvey co-founded Womanpower Unlimited, one of the civil rights organizations responsible for sustaining the Mississippi civil rights movement. The idea for the organization came to Harvey as she watched the first Freedom Riders in the state stand trial. Her co-founder, Aurelia N. Young, was the wife of one of the lawyers representing the Freedom Riders. The Freedom Riders did not plan to post bail and Harvey knew they would need resources whilst in confinement at Parchman Penitentiary. The group gained funding from local black Mississippians and utilized the power of women activists whom Harvey had realized were often restrained within male-dominated organizations like the NAACP or were largely ineffective within larger women's organizations which limited women's activism to more traditionally feminine roles such as hosting social events. Many Freedom Riders would cite the support they received from Womanpower Unlimited as the reason they were able to endure the harsh realities of imprisoned life. Womanpower Unlimited would later broaden its activist activities through voter registration events, school desegregation advocacy and creating educational scholarships. The organization offered housing and resources to those participating in the Freedom Summer of 1964.

Through her involvement in Wednesdays in Mississippi, Harvey was able to work across racial lines and create solidarity with many white women. Harvey provided funding and meeting spaces for the group. Following this integrationist approach, she and other members of Womanpower Unlimited organized a group called the Chain of Friendship which brought white women from northern states into Mississippi to develop an interracial community. Harvey also spent a decade serving on the Mississippi Advisory Committee to the US Commission on Civil Rights and was involved in several other civil rights groups, including the National Council of Negro Women, NAACP and the Mississippi Freedom Democratic Party.

=== Entrepreneurial ===
Through entrepreneurial activism, Harvey used her socioeconomic status and position as a black business-owner to advance black rights, businesses and communities. Many members of the black middle-class were threatened into positions of silence by their white employers during the civil rights movement. Clarie's own husband told her that he couldn't be part of the Mississippi Freedom Democratic Party because he was employed by a state institution. However, as the business-owner of Collins Funeral Home and Insurance Company and co-founder of State Mutual Savings and Loan Association, Harvey was only reliant on her black customers for income. This meant she was able to openly participate in the civil rights movement and condemn white supremacy without fear of financial retaliation from white Mississippians.

Harvey used her business savvy to assist the NAACP with their marketing strategies, promoted selective buying campaigns which led to financial losses for businesses refusing to employ or fairly treat black workers and used her funeral expertise and resources to coordinate the funeral of prominent civil rights activist and colleague, Medgar Evers. As a mortician, Harvey politicized death and sent newsletters from her funeral home to black Mississippians who may have been overwhelmed or desensitized by white violence.

=== Anti-poverty ===
Despite her own financial success, Harvey remained an outspoken anti-poverty advocate, arguing that it was necessary to improve the economic conditions of all black Southerners if the goal of racial equality was to be achieved. As a high-earning member of the African American community, Harvey believed she too had a role in combating poverty. She fought for the right to quality public housing, invested in black businesses and when she saw companies like Sears take advantage of the socioeconomically and racially oppressed, she immediately sold her stocks.

Harvey worked with Mayor Allen Thompson to improve the living conditions of economically oppressed black Mississippians. Initially, Thompson claimed that there were no "slums" in Jackson. Harvey responded to this by hosting tours of the low-income parts of their community. Her tours offered a refute to the Mayor's claims and highlighted the economic hardships many black Mississippians were forced to endure. Thompson decided to acknowledge the problem and work with Harvey, appointing her to the Jackson Redevelopment Authority. Harvey also worked with the Farish Street Management Association and Jackson Chapter of the National Business League to promote urban development.

When the Office of Economic Opportunity funded the Hinds County Community Service Association, Harvey served as its first chair. During her time with the Association, she convinced Vice President Hubert Humphrey to bring over 300 more jobs to the local Youth Corp.

=== Additional activist work ===
Though all of Harvey's work was done with an intersectional black feminist mindset, some accomplishments specifically related to feminism include counseling President Ford on women's issues in the United States and her contributions to the Mississippi Commission on the Status of Women.

Harvey advocated for children through her work as a member of the Children's Defense Fund in Washington D.C and by providing scholarships to teenagers who hoped to attend university.

She promoted the rights of several marginalized groups through her work as a member of the Board of Southern Regional Council, Inc., Mississippi Industrial Special Services and as an appointed member of the Progressive Action Committee. By invitations from President Lyndon B. Johnson and President Kennedy, Harvey contributed to the White House Conferences on Human Affairs. She also served on the advisory board for Habitat for Humanity, attended the "World Without the Bomb" Peace Conference in Ghana, acted as a delegate for the Women for Peace Conference in Geneva and the Seventeenth National Disarmament Conference in Geneva, and travelled to Paris for the Vietnam Peace Talks.

== Later life ==
Clarie and Martin never had children. Instead, Clarie spent her later years focusing her efforts on the local Jackson, Mississippi community. She also served as a trustee for several universities and institutes including Atlanta University, Rust College, Millsaps College and the Tuskegee Institute. She continued to work as a mortician and her business, the State Mutual Savings and Loan Association, would go on to become a multi-million dollar enterprise. Harvey continued her activist work until her death on May 27, 1995.

== Achievements ==
- Honorary Doctorate from Spelman College (1977).
- Honorary Doctorate from Rust College (December 1971).
- Outstanding Mississippian Award from Governor William Waller (December 30, 1974).
- Recipient of one of the "Awards of Distinction" from the University of Mississippi.
- Churchwoman of the year from Religious Heritage of America (1974).
- Upper Room Citation (1976).
- Woman of the Year from the National Funeral Directors Association (1955).
- Named Spelman's outstanding alumna (1966).
- Recipient of Outstanding Citizen of Jackson award (1971).
- NAACP Generational Award (1991).
- Mississippi Religious Leadership Conference Award (1973).
- Top Hat Award, New Pittsburg Courier (1974).
- Outstanding Small Business Woman, Central Region, National Council of Small Business Management Development (1976).
- Black Students Association for Outstanding Leadership (1982).
- Council of Deliberation Black History Award (1990).
- Recipient of the Black History award at Jackson State University (1990).
- Gave commencement speech at Spelman College (1973).
- State President of Mississippi Funeral Directors and Morticians Association.
- Albert Gallatin Business Award Certificate of Merit (1975).
- Regional VI Governor of the National Association of Funeral Directors and Embalmers (1956-1960).
