= Eros (given name) =

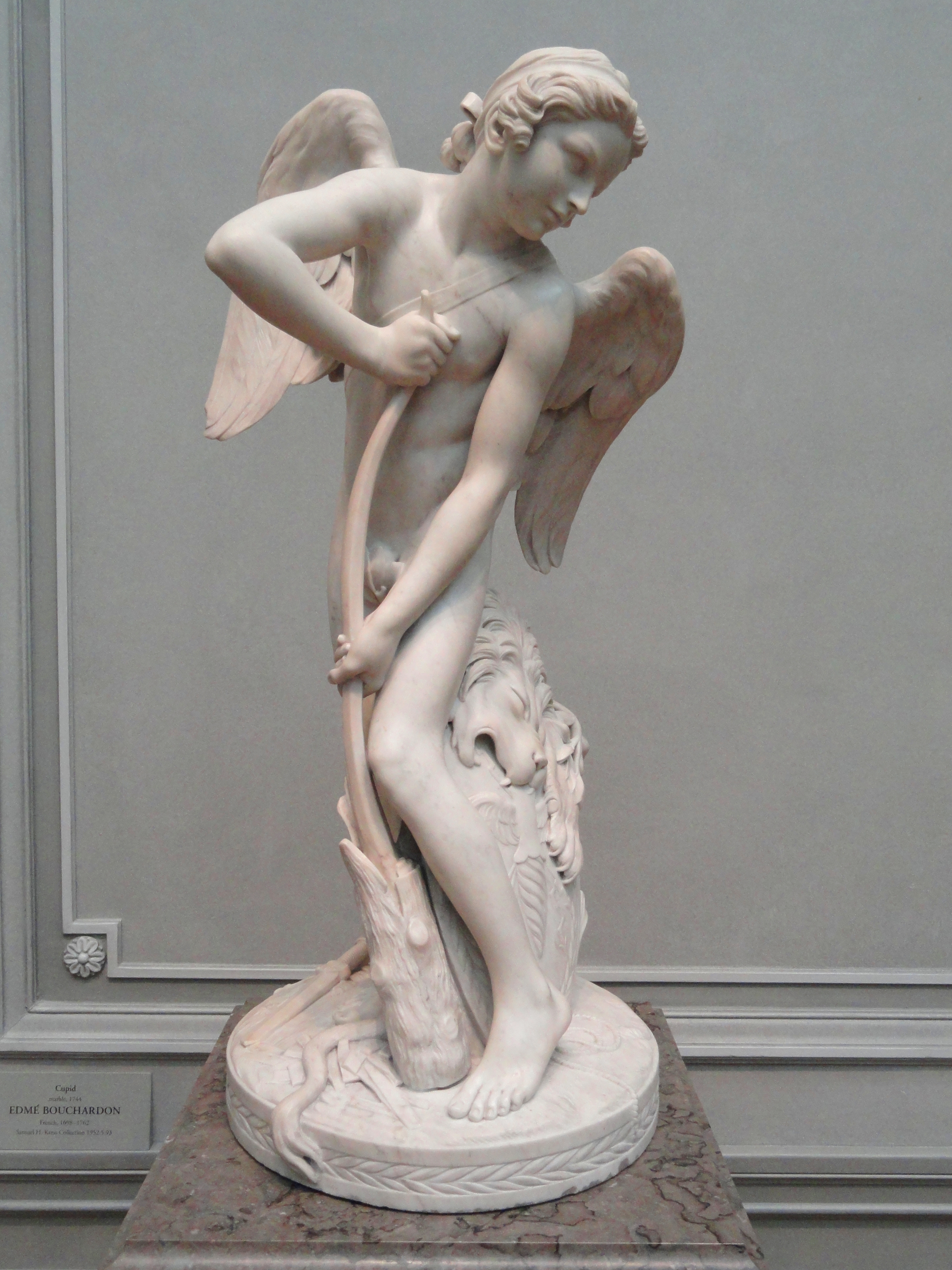

Eros is a masculine given name. Bearers include:

== Footballers ==
- Eros Bagnara (born 1985), Italian former footballer
- Eros Beraldo (1929–2004), Italian football player and manager
- Eros Dacaj (born 1996), German-Kosovar footballer
- Eros De Santis (born 1997), Italian footballer
- Eros Grezda (born 1995), Albanian footballer
- Eros Maddy (born 2001), Dutch footballer
- Eros Mancuso (born 1999), Argentine footballer
- Eros Medaglia (born 1994), Argentine footballer
- Eros Pérez (born 1976), Chilean former footballer and journalist
- Eros Pisano (born 1987), Italian footballer
- Eros Schiavon (born 1983), Italian footballer

== Other ==
- Eros, a secretary of Roman Emperor Aurelian, whose assassination he masterminded in 275 AD
- Eros Biondini (born 1971), Brazilian politician
- Eros Capecchi (born 1986), Italian former road cyclist
- Eros Correa (born 1993), American boxer
- Eros Djarot (born 1950), Indonesian songwriter, director and politician
- Eros Pagni (born 1939), Italian actor and voice actor
- Eros Ramazzotti (born 1963), Italian singer-songwriter and musician
- Eros Riccio (born 1977), Italian International Correspondence Chess Grandmaster
- James E. Winfield (1944–2000), full name James Eros Winfield, American civil rights lawyer, politician, city prosecutor
