= Lynching of Mack Charles Parker =

African American man who was lynched in the U.S.

Mack Charles Parker (May 20, 1936 – April 24, 1959) was a Black American victim of lynching in the United States. He had been accused of raping a pregnant White woman in northern Pearl River County, Mississippi. Three days before he was to stand trial, Parker was kidnapped from his jail cell in the Pearl River County Courthouse by a mob, beaten and shot. His body was found in the Pearl River, 20 miles west of Poplarville, 10 days later. Following an investigation by the Federal Bureau of Investigation, the men who killed him were released. Despite confessions, no one was ever indicted for the killing, albeit six of the suspects died within four years, one just six days later. Historian Howard Smead called the killing the "last classic lynching in America."

== Accusations of rape ==
Parker was arrested for the February 23, 1959, rape and kidnapping of June Walters, a pregnant White woman, in Pearl River County, Mississippi. Walters reported that the crime occurred on a dirt logging road called Black Creek Ford Road, off U. S. Route 11, approximately seven miles south of Lumberton, Mississippi, where she and her child were waiting alone in a car while her husband, Jimmy sought help for repairs. Parker vehemently denied having raped anyone. His supporters suggested that the rape accusations may have been fabricated by Walters as a means of concealing an ongoing consensual affair with a local White man. Walters was able to provide the race, gender, and approximate age of her alleged attacker.

According to reports published in the New Orleans Times-Picayune and the Jackson Clarion-Ledger, Parker and four friends, Norman Malachy, David Alfred, Curt Underwood and Tommy Grant were returning to Lumberton from Poplarville. The five men had been to Slim's, an illegal bar which was operated under the protection of the Poplarville City Police. It was located in the Black section of Poplarville, and was known for selling white lightning moonshine. As the five neared Lumberton, Parker and his four companions spotted a Dodge sedan broken down on the side of the road. Assuming the car was abandoned, they stopped. Parker got out and shone a flashlight into the car. Upon recognizing a White woman in the car, Parker returned to his brother's Chevy sedan and left. As they left the scene, Parker allegedly turned to his friends and said, "Why don't we stop and get some o' that white stuff?" Telling him he was crazy, the four men told Parker to take them home. According to local law enforcement officials, before the woman's husband could return to the disabled car, Parker allegedly returned, kidnapped June Walters and her four-year-old daughter, Debbie, at gunpoint and took them to Black Creek Ford Road, where he raped Walters. Curt Underwood, Parker's brother-in-law, who was there that night, disputed the version of events.

After an intensive manhunt, Lumberton police were informed by David Alfred's father, a local Baptist minister, that Parker was the perpetrator. Parker was arrested at approximately 10 a.m. on February 24 at his Lumberton home by Lumberton City Marshal Ham Slade. Parker was beaten by Slade and his deputies, to the horror of his mother, Mrs. Eliza Parker. Parker's screams could be heard several houses away.

Parker vehemently denied having raped anyone. In a police lineup at the Lumberton City Jail, the victim identified Parker. A check of the tire tracks left by the perpetrator's car indicated they were similar to those of Parker's Chevrolet, but a positive identification could not be made. Parker's fingerprints were not found at the scene. Soon after his arrest, and for his own protection, Lumberton Police had the Mississippi Highway Patrol transfer Parker to the Hinds County Jail in Jackson. While in the Hinds County Jail, Parker was subjected to several lie detector tests. All of the lie detector tests given Parker proved to be inconclusive or that he was telling the truth. In addition, no handgun was ever found by police, nor was one ever connected to Mack Charles Parker.

On April 13, Parker was indicted by a Pearl River County grand jury, on one count of rape and two counts of kidnapping. Two days later, Parker was returned to Pearl River County to appear before Judge Sebe Dale Sr., on April 17. Being represented by attorney and civil rights activist, R. Jess Brown of Vicksburg, Parker pleaded not guilty to each charge. Judge Dale set the trial date for April 27, and Parker was returned to his cell at the Pearl River County Courthouse. The involvement of Brown in the case led to fear he might be freed thanks to civil rights claims such as the absence of any Black person in the jury.

== Murder ==
=== Kidnapping from the prison ===
According to the FBI report on the case, sometime around 12.15 a.m. on April 25, a vigilante mob of eight to ten hooded and masked men, wearing gloves, entered the courthouse.

Supposedly, they were let into the locked jail area by a deputy sheriff, Jewell Alford, who was with them. As Alford unlocked the door, eight to ten from the mob entered Parker's cell. He begged for help from other prisoners, but the mob threatened them with guns. A life and death struggle soon ensued as Parker tried to escape and he was beaten with clubs by the mob. As the mob dragged Parker out of the courthouse, and down its concrete steps, he was bleeding profusely. He pleaded to be able to walk instead of being dragged. Blood spurted from his wounds, leaving bloody hand prints and pools of blood along the route out of the courthouse.

=== Transport to the Pearl River ===
The mob had two cars waiting outside for their escape. Parker was stuffed into the back seat of one and the two cars sped off west toward Bogalusa, Louisiana on Mississippi Highway 26. The car with Parker inside continued west on Mississippi Highway 26 until it reached the Mississippi-Louisiana border at the Pearl River Bridge, approximately 20 miles west of Poplarville.

=== Killing and disposal of the body ===
According to the FBI, the mob with Parker in the car drove into Louisiana, where they waited to make sure the road was traffic-free. Once they were assured they were in the clear, Parker was driven to the center of the bridge. He was then pulled from the car and shot twice in the chest from a range of approximately six inches. Parker died within seconds.

The original plan had been to castrate Parker and hang him from the superstructure of the Pearl River Bridge; however, with Parker now dead, the mob decided to abandon its plan in fear of being discovered. They proceeded to weight his body down with logging chains which were produced from the trunk of one of the cars. Once the chains were secured around Parker's body, it was tossed over the concrete railings of the bridge into the rain-swollen waters of the Pearl River below.

=== Discovery of the crime ===
Upon learning of the events in the early morning hours of April 25, Pearl River County Sheriff, Osborn Moody, informed the Mississippi Highway Patrol, who then urged him to contact the FBI. That same morning, Moody obtained a "John Doe" warrant for the kidnapping of Mack Charles Parker.

On May 4, Parker's bloated and decomposing body was found floating in the waters of the Pearl River two and one-half miles south of the Pearl River Bridge at Bogalusa.

== Investigation ==
=== FBI investigation ===
Almost immediately, 60 agents from the Federal Bureau of Investigation descended upon the town of Poplarville. In the two weeks following Parker's death, the FBI questioned hundreds of potential witnesses and suspects. Several local Poplarville men, Jewel Alford, Christopher Columbus "Crip" Reyer, L. C. Davis, "Preacher" James Floren Lee, his son James Floren "Jeff" Lee, Herman Schultz, Arthur Smith and J.P. Walker, a former Pearl River County Sheriff's deputy, who would be elected sheriff of Pearl River County in November 1963, quickly became the focus of the FBI's intensive probe into the abduction and death of Parker.

In a three-hour interrogation session, FBI agents browbeat Crip Reyer. Reyer finally admitted that his red and white 1956 Oldsmobile 88 had been used by the mob, but denied having anything to do with the abduction or killing of Parker.

On May 13, under intense pressure from FBI agents, Arthur Smith confirmed the role of each of the participants and supplied the names of Walker, Preacher Lee, L.C. Davis and the names of others who were in the two cars. Smith told agents that Lee, Reyer, Davis, and Walker were in the lead car that carried Parker from the jail.

=== In courts ===
The judge and prosecutor would not co-operate with the FBI investigation and refused to hand over FBI evidence to the grand jury, deeming it hearsay, even though several of the mob members had confessed to the lynching. Judge Dale, who praised Theodore Bilbo's racial beliefs, and was a member of the White Citizens' Council; refused to indict the suspects. Dale encouraged the grand jury to "have the backbone to stand against any tyranny," stating "you are now engaged in battle for our laws and courts for the preservation of our freedom and our way of life." He urged them to "keep their mouths shut." Dale also previously refused, before the lynching, Sheriff Moody's request to move Parker outside the county or have members of the Mississippi National Guard protect Parker.

After a Mississippi grand jury refused to indict the lynchers, a federal grand jury in Biloxi then oversaw the case under District Court Judge Sidney Mize in January 1960 and failed to indict some of the mob by a single vote. Before the trial, Dale went to meet Mize and managed to convince him to narrow the federal kidnapping statute.

Before the last grand jury convened, Poplarville mayor Pat Hyde stated that “you couldn’t convict the guilty parties if you had sound film of the lynching,” and an unnamed Poplarville businessman rhetorically asked why the FBI even bothered to investigate since no jury would convict the killers.

=== Reactions ===
A May 11 article in the Chicago Defender, a popular Black newspaper circulated throughout the South, recounted an interview with an anonymous White male from Poplarville, claiming to have personal knowledge that the charges against Parker were fabricated. The alleged witness claimed that the alleged victim, June Walters, was in fact having an affair with a local White man, and she went with him while her husband, Jimmy, was gone to get help to fix the car. When her absence was discovered before she returned, she concocted a rape and kidnapping story to shield her infidelity. The witness also indicated that the alleged victim fainted upon learning of Parker's kidnapping from the jail, and stated that he deserved a trial.

In June 1959, attempts were made to enact an anti-lynching bill, which was stalled, as many others, by the Southern Democratic bloc.

Unlike the article in the Chicago Defender, biographer Howard Smead, who wrote the book Blood Justice: The Lynching of Mack Charles Parker, believes that Parker was most likely guilty, but said he was "not 100 percent sure." Smead believes that Parker should have been given a fair trial and states that he never had a chance to prove his innocence. Smead writes that the local Black community, many of whom knew Parker, were divided in opinion of his guilt. Many who held him, at the time of the crime, to be guilty, never wavered in their view thereafter.

Some locals complained about supposed FBI encroachment and other aired typically racist statements, such as one resident stating to reporters that "Parker's a good nigger now. The only good nigger is a dead nigger." Other residents complained about "reckless conduct" from FBI agents, and an unnamed town leader said about the town that "We all are shook up over the lynching, but many suffer from a case of a bad conscience."

During the campaign for the Democratic primary for governorship, the following posters were affiched in the county by Ross Barnett supporters:

Remember Hungary. Remember Little Rock. Remember the Occupation of Poplarville by J. P. Coleman and the FBI. Don't forget that it was the Coleman-Gartin regime that called the FBI into Pearl River County. If Gartin is elected, the next occupation forces may be the N.A.A.C.P. and specially trained goon squads from the Justice Department.

During a speaking tour for the Mississippi State Sovereignty Commission in the North on 1963, Dale said, to persons asking him about the Parker case, that he didn't think the perpetrators would be caught, adding three of them already died. Six of the suspects indeed died between 1959 and 1963, one of them just six days after the lynching. They were Francis M. Barker, who died of a heart attack on April 30, 1959, Robert James Wheat Sr., who died suddenly on December 25, 1960, Hubert Amacker, who died on October 27, 1961, William Lowell Mooney, who died on November 22, 1961, Jeppie Amacker, who died on January 23, 1962, and Houston Amacker, who killed himself by drinking sulfuric acid on November 9, 1963. Houston had previously tried to kill himself a day after being questioned by the FBI.

Parker's family left the county after the murder.

== Current status ==
Despite an extensive investigation by the Federal Bureau of Investigation and the presentation of evidence before both county and federal grand juries, no indictment or conviction was ever obtained against any of the men who murdered Mack Charles Parker. The main suspects identified by the FBI have all since died from old age or other causes.

In 2009 the FBI announced they were re-opening the Mack Charles Parker case.

== See also ==
- List of kidnappings (1950–1959)
- List of solved missing person cases (1950–1969)

== Sources ==
- Howard Smead, Blood Justice: The Lynching of Mack Charles Parker, New York, Oxford University Press, 1986; ISBN 0-19-505429-6
