= Canton Public School District (Mississippi) =

School district in Mississippi, US

The Canton Public School District is a public school district based in Canton, Mississippi, United States.

In addition to Canton it serves a part of Gluckstadt.

== Schools ==
- Canton High School
- Huey L Porter Middle School
- Nichols Middle School
- Canton Elementary School
- Jimmie M. Goodloe Elementary School
- McNeal Elementary School
- Canton School of Arts and Sciences
- Canton Public Alternative School

== Demographics ==
=== 2006–07 school year ===
There were a total of 3,325 students enrolled in the Canton Public School District during the 2006–2007 school year. The gender makeup of the district was 50% female and 50% male. The racial makeup of the district was 98.71% African American, 0.78% Hispanic, 0.39% White, and 0.09% Asian. 89.7% of the district's students were eligible to receive free lunch.

=== Previous school years ===
School Year	Enrollment	Gender Makeup		Racial Makeup				
School Year	Enrollment	Female	Male	Asian	African American	Hispanic	Native American	White
2005–06	3,227	51%	49%	0.06%	99.07%	0.59%	–	0.28%
2004–05	3,377	51%	49%	0.06%	99.29%	0.44%	–	0.21%
2003–04	3,393	51%	49%	0.06%	99.53%	0.21%	–	0.21%
2002–03	3,560	51%	49%	–	99.58%	0.22%	–	0.20%

== Accountability statistics ==
	2006–07	2005–06	2004–05	2003–04	2002–03
District Accreditation Status	Accredited	Accredited	Accredited	Advised	Accredited
School Performance Classifications
Level 5 (Superior Performing) Schools	0	0	0	0	0
Level 4 (Exemplary) Schools	1	0	0	0	0
Level 3 (Successful) Schools	0	1	2	2	0
Level 2 (Under Performing) Schools	3	2	1	0	1
Level 1 (Low Performing) Schools	0	0	0	1	2
Not Assigned	1	1	1	1	1

== See also ==
- List of school districts in Mississippi
