= James E. Winfield =

American lawyer (1944–2000)

James Winfield
- Born: James Eros Winfield Sr. March 20, 1944; Port Gibson, Mississippi, U.S.
- Died: June 5, 2000 (aged 56); Rolling Fork, Mississippi, U.S.
- Burial place: Greenlawn Gardens Cemetery, Vicksburg, Mississippi, U.S.
- Education: Morris Brown College (BA), University of Mississippi School of Law (JD)
- Spouse: Linda H. Evans
- Children: 3

James Eros Winfield Sr. (March 20, 1944 – June 5, 2000) was an American civil rights lawyer, politician, and city prosecutor in Vicksburg, Mississippi. He was the first Black city prosecutor in Vicksburg.

== Early life and education ==
James Eros Winfield Sr. was born on March 20, 1944, in Port Gibson, Mississippi. His parents were Gertrude Moran (née Green) and Elias Winfield. At the age of 6 his family moved to Vicksburg, Mississippi. He graduated in 1963 from Rosa A. Temple High School.

Winfield attended the Morris Brown College (B.A. 1967) in Atlanta, Georgia; and the University of Mississippi School of Law (J.D. 1972) in Oxford, Mississippi.

During the Vietnam War, Winfield was drafted in to the United States Army in 1969.

He married Linda H. Evans, and together they had three sons. His son Paul E. Winfield served as mayor of Vicksburg (2009–2013), and was convicted in 2015 of bribery in a federal court.

== Career ==
After graduating with his J.D. degree, Winfield opened a law practice with R. Jess Brown. He was a member of the state bar in Mississippi since 1972, and was admitted to practice law in all state courts.

In 1975, Winfield ran for a post in the House of Representatives for Warren and Claiborne Counties.

Winfield was the first African American city prosecutor in Vicksburg when he was appointed to the role in July 1977. His clients included Vicksburg-Warren School District, the Woodville School District, and the Sharkey County Board of Supervisors.

In October 1980, Winfield announced candidacy for district attorney in Claiborne, Issaquena, Sharkey and Warren Counties.

He had co-founded the Winfield and Moran Law Firm in Vicksburg in 1988, and worked alongside his brother.

Winfield was a former president of the National Alumni Association and the Board of Trustees of Morris Brown College, his alma mater. He was a member of the NAACP, the Phi Beta Sigma, the Tyner–Ford Post No. 213 of the American Legion, the D.W. Simmons Brotherhood Relief Club, the Mississippi Trial Lawyer Association, and Lamar Order of the University of Mississippi School of Law.

== Death and legacy ==
He died at age 56 in a car accident on June 5, 2000, in Rolling Fork, Mississippi.

A monument at Washington Street Park in Vicksburg is dedicated to him and four other civic leaders.
