= Emergency response officers =

Emergency response officers (EROs) are people who are trained to be the first line of response in any emergency situation.

The primary role played by EROs are to check out any reported incident locally and assess the situation. If deemed appropriate the professional emergency services like the police, ambulance and/or fire brigade will be called up and the EROs will facilitate the access of the professional services to the right location and provide the initial briefing. This is very important as the EROs are local to a building or complex and are normally able to reach the location of a reported incident before the professional services can get there.

The first few minutes are crucial and any assistance provided in that period can be the difference between the life and death of a victim.

The response team consists of security, medical and fire crew and should be familiar with alarm systems and CCTV monitoring. The emergency response officer is responsible for a variety of roles.

== See also ==
- Emergency management
- Fire fighting
- First aid
- NIBHV
- SBN
