= Canton High School (Mississippi) =

Location
- 634 Finney Road; Canton, Mississippi

Information
- School type: Public
- Established: 1874
- School district: Canton Public School District
- NCES District ID: 2800900
- Superintendent: Gary P. Hannah
- NCES School ID: 280090000101
- Principal: Kari Johnson
- Grades: 10-12
- Enrollment: 643 (2023-2024)
- Student to teacher ratio: 20.94
- Colors: Royal blue and gold
- Mascot: Tigers
- Website: chs.cantonschools.net

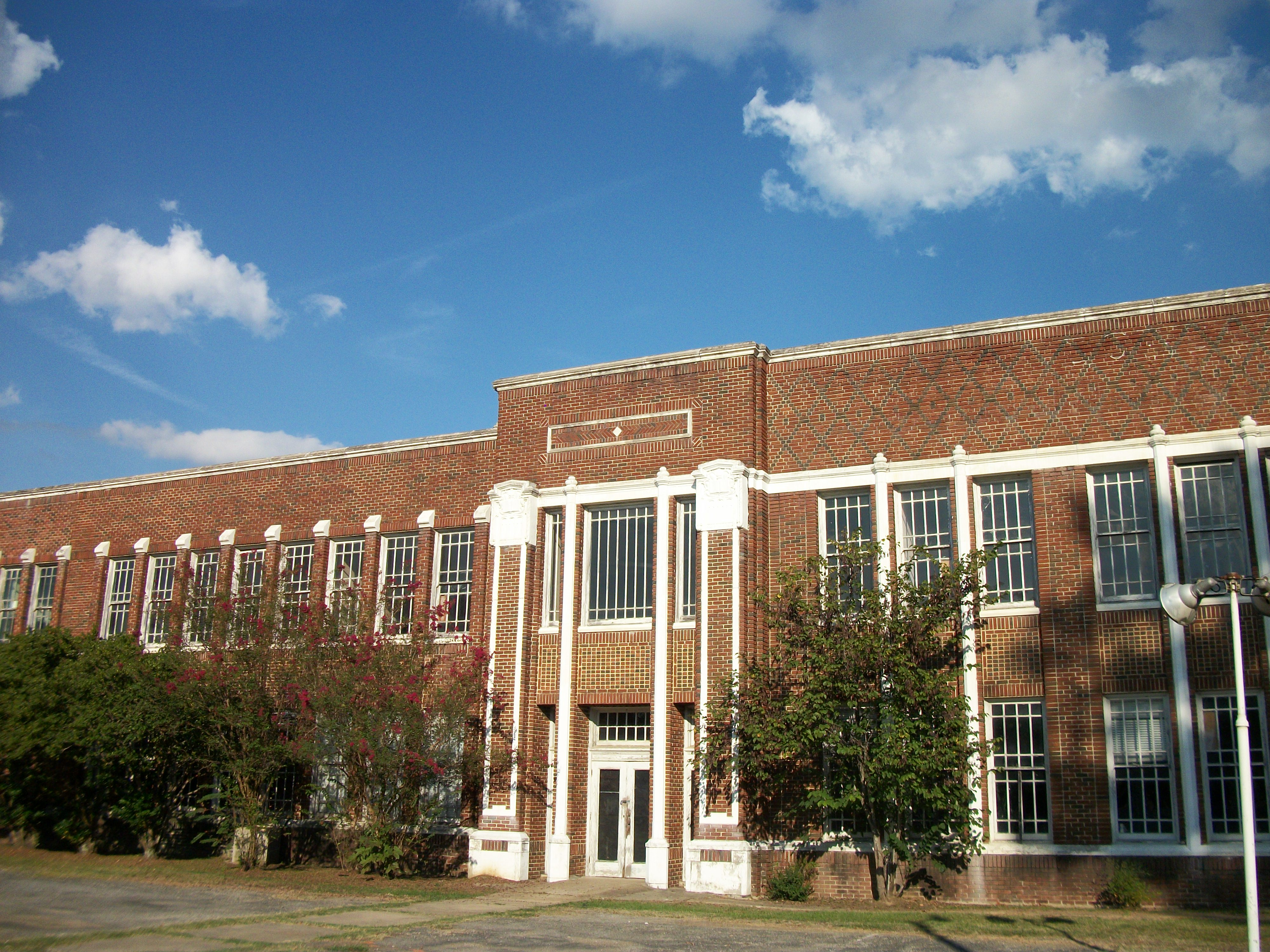

Canton High School is a public high school in Canton, Mississippi. It is part of the Canton Public School District. All of the student body is categorized as economically disadvantaged and almost 100 percent are African American.

In addition to Canton it serves a part of Gluckstadt.

== History ==
Canton High School was preceded by Canton Female Academy. The school has also been documented as Canton Young Ladies' Academy. Canton High School started its first 10 month session in 1874.

The school's historic building was designed by Jackson architect N. W. Overstreet and built in 1923. It closed in 1969, but has since been used as a furniture store and church. In 2015, the building and its additions were renovated for use as apartments.

Madison County Training School served the area. A. M. Rogers High School was dedicated in 1958 in the wake of Brown v Board of Education and served the area's African American students. Students protested poor conditions and supplies. The school was described by some to bear a "striking resemblance of an auction barn" and to be "inadequate to provide for each child the maximum educational opportunity that this day and age demand".

Canton School Superintendent D. M. Allen touted investments in segregated schools and criticized the pulling of students in protests during 1964. In 1964, parents attempted to register their children at Belmont High School decrying the poor conditions and limited offerings available to them at the city's segregated schools. In 1969, the school was renamed to Canton High School after the historic building closed.

== Athletics ==
Tigers are the school mascot, and the school colors are blue and gold. The school's football team dates to 1910 and has an 0-10 playoff record. Ernest Alley coached at the school for several years in the 1930s.

== Alumni ==
- Damien Lewis, football player
- George Doherty, football player and coach
- Marsha Barbour, first lady of Mississippi from 2004 to 2012
- Kenneth Wayne Jones, politician

== See also ==
- List of Mississippi Landmarks
- National Register of Historic Places listings in Madison County, Mississippi
