= Rachel B. Noel =

American politician

- Born: January 15, 1918; Hampton, Virginia, USA
- Died: February 4, 2008 (aged 90); Oakland, California
- Education: Hampton Institute; Fisk University
- Occupations: Educator, politician, civil rights leader

Rachel Bassette Noel (January 15, 1918 – February 4, 2008) was an American educator, politician and civil rights leader in Denver, Colorado. She is known for the "Noel Resolution", a 1968 plan to integrate the Denver city school district, and her work to implement that plan, as well as other work on civil rights. When elected to the Denver Public Schools Board of Education in 1965, Noel was the first African-American woman elected to public office in Colorado. In 1996, Noel was inducted into the Colorado Women's Hall of Fame.

She was born in Hampton, Virginia to college-educated parents; her father was a doctor. She earned bachelor's and master's degrees from Hampton Institute and Fisk University, respectively. She and her husband, a physician from Jackson, Mississippi, moved to Denver after he finished his residency.

== Personal life ==
Rachel Bassette was born in 1918 in Hampton, Virginia, to parents who were both college graduates. Her father, A. W. E. Bassette Jr., was a lawyer. From an early age, her parents emphasized the importance of education. Bassette graduated magna cum laude with a bachelor's degree from Hampton Institute (now known as Hampton University) and earned a master's degree in sociology from Fisk University, both historically black universities.

In October 1942, she married Dr. Edmond F. Noel (1916-1986) from Jackson, Mississippi, whom she had met at Fisk. Born in Holmes County, Mississippi and reared in Jackson, he was named for a half-uncle, Edmond Favor Noel, governor of Mississippi, serving from 1908 to 1912. The African-American physician and European-American politician were from different lines of descendants of Leland Noel, a major white planter in Holmes County before the American Civil War. Noel completed his undergraduate degree at Howard University and got his medical degree at Fisk.

Edmond Noel served as a medical officer in the Army during World War II, from 1942 to April 1946. After he completed his residency, the Noel couple moved to Denver, Colorado in 1949. It was during the years of the Great Migration of African Americans from the South to the West. Edmond Noel was the first African American to practice medicine in Denver. He was affiliated with Rose Hospital, a new hospital founded by the Jewish community. He was the first African American to have staff privileges at a hospital in Denver. He also set up his own practice in the Five Points community.

Together, they had a son, Edmond "Buddy" Noel Jr., born in 1946, and a daughter, Angela Noel, born in 1950. Buddy graduated from Dartmouth College and Harvard University Law, and practices as a lawyer in Denver.

Rachel Bassette Noel became increasingly active in civil rights and school issues in Denver. (See below).

Her husband Edmond Noel died in 1986. In her last years, Noel moved from Denver to Oakland, California in 2007 to live with her daughter. Noel died on February 4, 2008. She is survived by her two children, five grandchildren and three great-grandchildren.

== Civic life ==
Noel became active in civic affairs and politics in the 1960s, working to integrate local schools and ensure that minorities had equal opportunities. In 1965, Noel was elected as the first African American to serve on the Denver Public Schools Board of Education. She was the first African-American woman elected to public office in Colorado.

She presented what became known as the Noel Resolution to the Board of Education on April 25, 1968, and called for the Denver area school district superintendent to develop a plan for integration, providing equal educational opportunity for all children. Public opposition was high, and Noel and her family received many threatening phone calls and hate mail. The resolution was passed in February 1970.

Noel was a professor at Metropolitan State College of Denver, where she founded the African-American Studies Department in 1971, chairing it until 1980. Noel was also a member of the Chancellor's Advisory Committee for the Health Sciences at the University of Colorado at Boulder and the University of Colorado at Denver. She was appointed as a Commissioner of the Denver Housing Authority

Noel served on the Advisory Board of the United States Civil Rights Commission.

== Legacy and honors ==
- She was awarded an Honorary Doctor of Public Service degree by the University of Denver.
- In 1976 she was appointed by Governor Richard Lamm to serve on the University of Colorado Board of Regents; in 1978 she was elected statewide to a six-year term on the board, and served as chair of the board for one year.
- The Rachel B. Noel Distinguished Professorship was endowed in her honor in 1981 at Metropolitan State College of Denver. A visiting professor is named each year; Noel Professors have included Princeton professor Cornel West, international philanthropist Julius Coles, pianist Billy Taylor, author Iyanla Vanzant, Johnnetta B. Cole, former president of Spelman College; jazz singer Dianne Reeves; Ossie Davis, the actor and civil rights activist; and Lerone Bennett, Jr., executive editor of Ebony (magazine).
- In 1990 she received the Martin Luther King Jr. Humanitarian Award.
- 1996, Noel was inducted into the Colorado Women's Hall of Fame.
- The Rocky Mountain Prep Noel middle school and the Rachel B. Noel campus, home of Montbello Middle School (DPS), in Denver is named in her honor.

== See also ==
- Brown v. Board of Education
- Education in the United States
- Plessy v. Ferguson
- Racial segregation
