= Stichting Bedrijfshulpverlening Nederland =

Stichting Bedrijfshulpverlening Nederland (SBN) is a Dutch non-profit organization that deals with the training and certification of Emergency Response Officers for both companies and individual students. SBN also often performs research on emergency management for businesses, which are regularly quoted by leading Dutch media.

With over 80 training locations, Stichting Bedrijfshulpverlening Nederland is the largest emergency management educator in the Netherlands. The company was founded in 2000.

== See also ==
- Emergency management
- First Aid
