= Canton, Mississippi =

- City
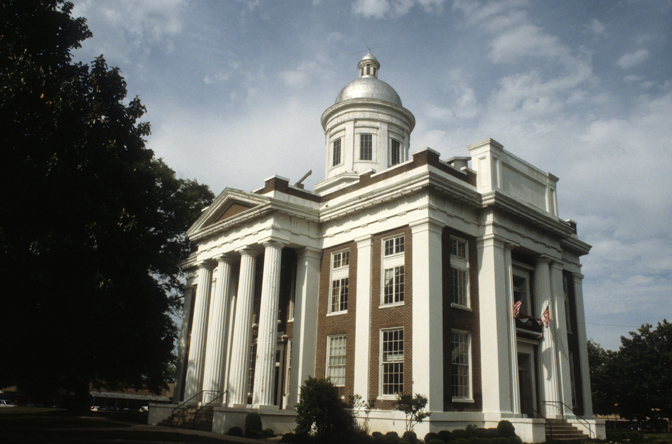
- Madison County Courthouse in Canton

- Flag Logo
- Nickname: Movie Capitol of Mississippi
- Motto: One People/One Voice/One Goal
- Location in Madison County and the state of Mississippi

- Location in the United States
- Coordinates: 32°36′43″N 90°01′24″W
- Country: United States
- State: Mississippi
- County: Madison

Government
  - Mayor: Tim Taylor (D)

Area
  - Total: 21.57 sq mi (55.9 km^{2})
  - Land: 21.28 sq mi (55.1 km^{2})
  - Water: 0.30 sq mi (0.78 km^{2})
- Elevation: 223 ft (68 m)

Population (2020)
  - Total: 10,948
  - Density: 514.59/sq mi (198.68/km^{2})
- Time zone: UTC−6 (Central (CST))
  - Summer (DST): UTC−5 (CDT)
- ZIP code: 39046
- Area code: 601
- FIPS code: 28-11100
- GNIS feature ID: 2403988
- Website: cantonms.gov

Canton is a city in and the county seat of Madison County, Mississippi, United States, and is situated in the northern part of the metropolitan area surrounding the state capital, Jackson. The population of Canton was 10,948 at the 2020 census, down from 13,189 in 2010.

The city is adjacent to a large auto manufacturing facility owned by Nissan.

== History ==
Before 1820, the area of Madison County, Mississippi was Choctaw territory. With the 1820 Treaty of Doak's Stand the land became the property of the United States Government. However, this treaty caused dissent at the Western borders of Arkansas, where the displaced Choctaw people began to settle, and in 1830 the Treaty of Dancing Rabbit resolved the matter.

Although not a major battle site during the Civil War, Canton was important as a rail and logistics center, and was twice invaded by Unionists. Many wounded soldiers were treated in or transported through the city, and as a consequence it has a large Confederate cemetery.

Much of Canton is on the National Register of Historic Places. The courthouse square is a historic shopping district and host to the Canton Flea Market. The picturesque Georgian courthouse is particularly notable and often appears in photographic exhibits of the South. The east side of town is a large part of the historic district with many homes.

At the time of the Civil Rights Movement, The Canton Freedom House was established when, in 1963, grocery store owners George and Rembert Washington, allowed George Raymond, a Congress of Racial Equality (CORE) organizer, to use a rental property to live and work in. The Freedom House became the target of segregationists, but remains in use by CORE.

== Geography ==
Canton is in central Madison County 24 miles (39 km) northeast of Jackson. Canton is bordered to the south by the city of Gluckstadt.

U.S. Route 51 passes through the center of the city as Liberty Street and Union Street, leading southwest to Jackson and north-northeast 19 miles (31 km) to Pickens. Mississippi Highway 16 passes through the city center on East Peace Street and North Liberty Street, leading east 31 miles (50 km) to Carthage and northwest 30 miles (48 km) to Yazoo City. MS 22 has its eastern terminus in the center of Canton and leads west 18 miles (29 km) to Flora. MS 43 passes through the east side of Canton, leading northeast 47 miles (76 km) to Kosciusko and southeast 30 miles (48 km) to Pelahatchie. Interstate 55 passes through the west side of the city, with access from Exits 118 (Nissan Parkway) and Exit 119 (MS 22). I-55 leads southwest to Jackson and north 85 miles (137 km) to Grenada.

According to the U.S. Census Bureau, the city of Canton has a total area of 21.6 square miles (56 km^{2}), of which 21.3 square miles (55 km^{2}) are land and 0.3 square miles (0.8 km^{2}), or 1.38%, are water. Batchelor Creek flows westward through the city just north of downtown, and Bear Creek flows to the northwest through the southern part of the city. The city is in the watershed of the Big Black River.

=== Climate ===
According to the Köppen Climate Classification system, Canton has a humid subtropical climate, abbreviated "Cfa" on climate maps. The hottest temperature recorded in Canton was 108 °F (42.2 °C) on September 7, 1925, while the coldest temperature recorded was −11 °F (−23.9 °C) on January 27, 1940.

Climate data for Canton, Mississippi, 1991–2020 normals, extremes 1892–present
Month	Jan	Feb	Mar	Apr	May	Jun	Jul	Aug	Sep	Oct	Nov	Dec	Year
Record high °F (°C)	83 (28)	87 (31)	95 (35)	95 (35)	99 (37)	104 (40)	106 (41)	107 (42)	108 (42)	100 (38)	89 (32)	85 (29)	108 (42)
Mean maximum °F (°C)	74.1 (23.4)	77.2 (25.1)	82.9 (28.3)	86.0 (30.0)	90.9 (32.7)	94.6 (34.8)	97.5 (36.4)	97.5 (36.4)	95.1 (35.1)	89.6 (32.0)	80.5 (26.9)	75.4 (24.1)	99.1 (37.3)
Mean daily maximum °F (°C)	56.0 (13.3)	59.8 (15.4)	68.2 (20.1)	75.3 (24.1)	82.5 (28.1)	88.8 (31.6)	91.8 (33.2)	91.1 (32.8)	87.6 (30.9)	77.9 (25.5)	66.0 (18.9)	58.1 (14.5)	75.3 (24.0)
Daily mean °F (°C)	44.8 (7.1)	47.8 (8.8)	55.8 (13.2)	63.0 (17.2)	71.4 (21.9)	77.7 (25.4)	81.0 (27.2)	80.0 (26.7)	75.2 (24.0)	64.4 (18.0)	53.1 (11.7)	46.7 (8.2)	63.4 (17.5)
Mean daily minimum °F (°C)	33.6 (0.9)	35.9 (2.2)	43.4 (6.3)	50.7 (10.4)	60.3 (15.7)	66.6 (19.2)	70.2 (21.2)	68.9 (20.5)	62.8 (17.1)	50.8 (10.4)	40.4 (4.7)	35.3 (1.8)	51.6 (10.9)
Mean minimum °F (°C)	17.0 (−8.3)	21.6 (−5.8)	27.1 (−2.7)	35.3 (1.8)	45.5 (7.5)	58.6 (14.8)	63.8 (17.7)	62.2 (16.8)	49.6 (9.8)	35.3 (1.8)	25.9 (−3.4)	21.2 (−6.0)	15.1 (−9.4)
Record low °F (°C)	−11 (−24)	−3 (−19)	15 (−9)	28 (−2)	35 (2)	43 (6)	51 (11)	52 (11)	34 (1)	20 (−7)	12 (−11)	2 (−17)	−11 (−24)
Average precipitation inches (mm)	5.15 (131)	4.92 (125)	5.69 (145)	6.09 (155)	4.73 (120)	4.02 (102)	4.60 (117)	3.84 (98)	4.06 (103)	4.30 (109)	4.64 (118)	5.01 (127)	57.05 (1,450)
Average snowfall inches (cm)	0.0 (0.0)	0.1 (0.25)	0.0 (0.0)	0.0 (0.0)	0.0 (0.0)	0.0 (0.0)	0.0 (0.0)	0.0 (0.0)	0.0 (0.0)	0.0 (0.0)	0.0 (0.0)	0.4 (1.0)	0.5 (1.25)
Average precipitation days (≥ 0.01 in)	9.7	9.3	9.8	8.3	8.5	8.8	9.2	9.1	5.9	6.5	7.6	8.8	101.5
Average snowy days (≥ 0.1 in)	0.0	0.1	0.0	0.0	0.0	0.0	0.0	0.0	0.0	0.0	0.0	0.0	0.1
Source 1: NOAA
Source 2: National Weather Service

== Demographics ==
Historical population
Census	Pop.	Note	%±
1870	1,963		—
1880	2,131		8.6%
1890	3,404		59.7%
1900	3,464		1.8%
1910	3,929		13.4%
1920	3,252		−17.2%
1930	4,725		45.3%
1940	6,011		27.2%
1950	7,048		17.3%
1960	9,707		37.7%
1970	10,503		8.2%
1980	11,116		5.8%
1990	10,062		−9.5%
2000	12,911		28.3%
2010	13,189		2.2%
2020	10,948		−17.0%
U.S. Decennial Census

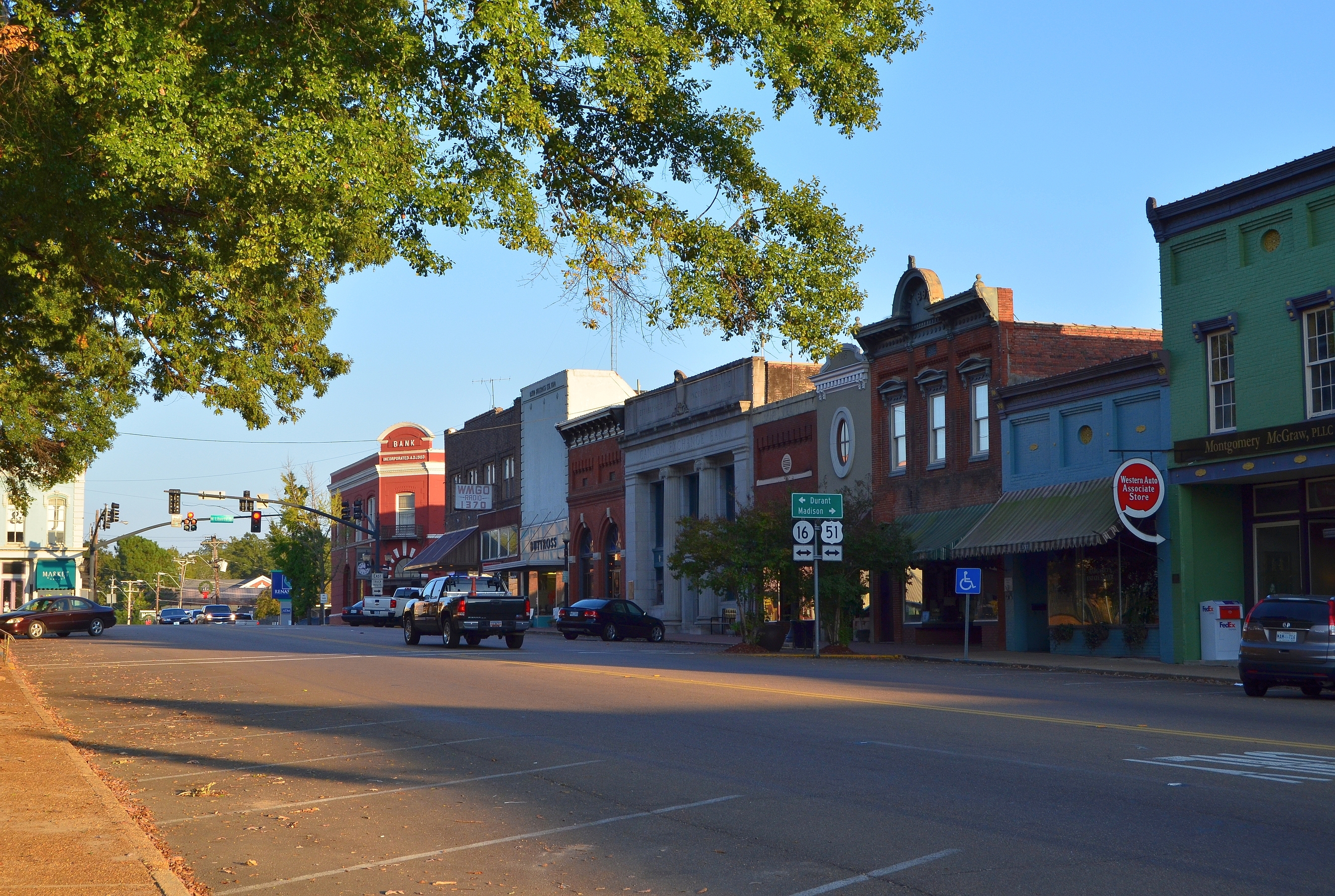
Courthouse Square

=== 2020 census ===
As of the 2020 census, Canton had a population of 10,948. There were 4,057 households, including 2,953 families. The median age was 36.5 years. 23.6% of residents were under the age of 18 and 15.4% of residents were 65 years of age or older. For every 100 females there were 93.8 males, and for every 100 females age 18 and over there were 89.0 males age 18 and over.

90.0% of residents lived in urban areas, while 10.0% lived in rural areas.

Of the 4,057 households, 32.5% had children under the age of 18 living in them. Of all households, 25.6% were married-couple households, 22.5% were households with a male householder and no spouse or partner present, and 45.6% were households with a female householder and no spouse or partner present. About 34.7% of all households were made up of individuals and 13.2% had someone living alone who was 65 years of age or older.

There were 4,583 housing units, of which 11.5% were vacant. The homeowner vacancy rate was 2.3% and the rental vacancy rate was 9.8%.

Racial composition as of the 2020 census
Race	Number	Percent
White	1,783	16.3%
Black or African American	8,017	73.2%
American Indian and Alaska Native	103	0.9%
Asian	63	0.6%
Native Hawaiian and Other Pacific Islander	3	0.0%
Some other race	691	6.3%
Two or more races	288	2.6%
Hispanic or Latino (of any race)	981	9.0%

=== 2010 census ===
As of the census of 2010, there were 13,189 people and 4,494 households in the city with an average household size of 2.99. The population density was 621.1 inhabitants per square mile (239.8/km^{2}). There were 4,933 housing units. The racial makeup of the city was 19.5% White, 74.7% African American, 0.2% Native American, 0.6% Asian, 0.1% Native Hawaiian and Other Pacific Islander, and 0.8% from two or more races. Hispanic or Latino of any race were 5.5% of the population.

The age distribution was 27.5% under the age of 18 and 10.8% 65 or older. 50.8% of the population were female.

The median household income was $33,350. The per capita income for the city was $15,192. About 31.4% of the population were below the poverty line.

=== 2000 census ===
At the 2000 census, there were 12,911 people in 4,093 households, including 2,991 families, in the city. The population density was 694.1 inhabitants per square mile (268.0/km^{2}). There were 4,333 housing units at an average density of 232.9 per square mile (89.9/km^{2}). The racial makeup of the city was 18.64% White, 80.30% African American, 0.15% Native American, 0.20% Asian, 0.14% from other races, and 0.57% from two or more races. Hispanic or Latino of any race were 0.43% of the population.

Of the 4,093 households 37.1% had children under the age of 18 living with them, 32.4% were married couples living together, 34.9% had a female householder with no husband present, and 26.9% were non-families. 23.8% of households were one person and 10.9% were one person aged 65 or older. The average household size was 2.99 and the average family size was 3.55.

The age distribution was 32.3% under the age of 18, 11.2% from 18 to 24, 26.1% from 25 to 44, 18.5% from 45 to 64, and 11.9% 65 or older. The median age was 30 years. For every 100 females, there were 85.7 males. For every 100 females age 18 and over, there were 79.7 males.

The median household income was $24,237 and the median family income was $27,782. Males had a median income of $25,179 versus $20,815 for females. The per capita income for the city was $12,643. About 27.7% of families and 34.8% of the population were below the poverty line, including 49.8% of those under age 18 and 25.5% of those age 65 or over.

== Government ==
The city council consists of seven wards with each ward electing one member. The mayor is elected in a citywide vote. In 2025, Tim Taylor, a Democrat, was elected mayor of Canton.

== Economy ==
A Nissan plant is sited just outside the southwest city limits. In 2011 Canton officials considered annexing it.

== Notable people ==
- Barbara Blackmon (born 1955), Former Mississippi State Senator and Attorney; 2003 Mississippi Lieutenant Governor candidate.
- Edward Blackmon Jr. (born 1947), Former Mississippi State Representative and an attorney; Tougaloo College's board of trustees
- Sister Thea Bowman (1937–1990), Roman Catholic nun (Franciscan Sisters of Perpetual Adoration)
- Flonzie Brown Wright (born 1942), African-American civil rights activist
- The Canton Spirituals, gospel recording group
- Homer Casteel (1879–1958), lieutenant governor from 1920 to 1924
- Annie Bell Robinson Devine (1912–2000), civil rights activist
- Earl B. Dickerson (1891–1986), World War I veteran, first black graduate from University of Chicago Law School, civil rights attorney, argued Hansberry v. Lee before the United States Supreme Court, founding member of the American Legion
- George Doherty (1920–1987), football player, Buffalo Bills
- Scott Field (1847–1931), U.S. congressman from Texas
- Rowland Garrett (born 1950), professional basketball player
- L. C. Greenwood (1946–2013), NFL player with the Pittsburgh Steelers
- Caroline Herring (born 1969), folk singer
- Elmore James (1918–1963), blues singer, slide guitarist
- Sonny Landreth (born 1951), blues guitarist
- Ronnie Lester (born 1959), University of Iowa basketball All-American, NBA player for Chicago Bulls and Los Angeles Lakers
- Damien Lewis (born 1997), NFL player for the Carolina Panthers
- Samuel Mockbee (1944–2001), architect
- Rev. Cleophus Robinson (1932–1998), gospel singer
- John Henry Rogers (1845–1911), congressman from Arkansas and a federal judge; grew up near Madison
- Reed Stringer (born 1979), college football coach
- Arthur Tate (born 1939), Mississippi state senator
- William M. Walton (1832–1915), Texas Attorney General
- Quinndary Weatherspoon (born 1996), NBA player

== Mississippi Blues Trail ==
Canton is officially on the Mississippi Blues Trail. Elmore James, a blues singer and a familiar figure in Canton, learned electronics by working in a radio repair shop on Hickory Street. Canton is rich in blues history centered on the juke joints of Hickory Street, known to locals as "The Hollow", as well as other places in Canton. A Mississippi Blues Trail historic marker was placed in Canton on Hickory Street to honor the contribution of James to the development of the blues in Mississippi. Other noted blues performers associated with Canton include Grady Champion, Little Brother Montgomery, William "Do-Boy" Diamond, Boyd Rivers and Johnny Temple. Musicians include studio guitarist Bucky Barrett and the slide guitarist Sonny Landreth. Gospel singers include the Canton Spirituals and Reverend Cleophus Robinson.

In his dedication of Hickory Street, Governor Haley Barbour said,

With his innovative contributions to the electric slide guitar style, legendary Elmore James is among the many reasons Mississippi is truly the birthplace of America's music. Like so many others, Elmore's work was greatly influenced by his childhood home in Canton, where he joined the ranks of musicians like B.B. King and Little Milton to play the blues on Hickory Street. Today's blues trail marker not only recognizes the achievements of the talented Elmore James but also pays tribute to Canton's colorful blues heritage.

== Education ==
The vast city of Canton is within the Canton Public School District. Very small parts are in the Madison County School District. The former operates Canton High School.

Canton Academy, a private school, is a segregation academy in the area.

== In popular culture ==
- 1974 Thieves Like Us
- 1988 Mississippi Burning
- 1996 A Time to Kill
- 1998 Walking in Mississippi
- 2000 My Dog Skip
- 2000 O Brother, Where Art Thou?
- 2001 The Ponder Heart
- 2001 Biker Zombies from Detroit
- 2008 Ballast
- 2013 As I Lay Dying
- 2016 Saved By Grace
- 2020 "A Time For Mercy", book by John Grisham
