= Encyclopedia of Reagents for Organic Synthesis =

Encyclopedia published by John Wiley & Sons

The Encyclopedia of Reagents for Organic Synthesis is published in print and online by John Wiley & Sons Ltd. The online version is also known as e-EROS. The encyclopedia contains a description of the use of reagents used in organic chemistry. The eight-volume print version includes 3500 alphabetically arranged articles and the online version is regularly updated to include new reagents and catalysts.
