= Reinhard Erös =

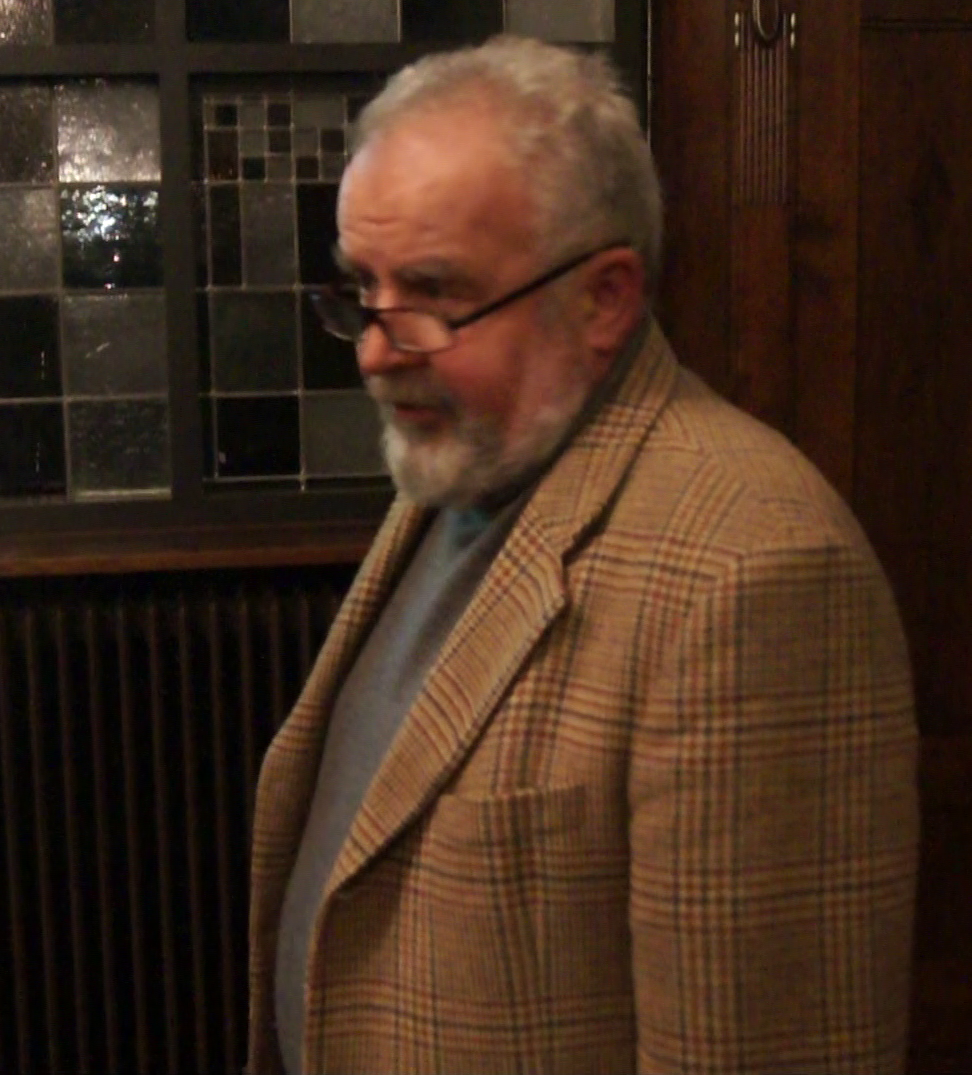

Reinhard Alois Erös (born 1948, in Tirschenreuth, Bavaria, Germany) is a medical doctor and former Colonel of the German army. Since 1998 he has been running the Kinderhilfe Afghanistan a German NGO dedicated to helping the children of eastern Afghanistan. The organization builds and runs local and high schools, orphanages, medical centers, computer education centers and professional schools. He is helped by his wife Annette and his five children, and lives in Mintraching in Bavaria, and he spends large parts of the year in Afghanistan.

== Life ==
From 1967 to 1972 Erös served as an officer with the German airborne and LRRP forces. After he had finished his service he studied medicine and political science and joined the army again as a medical officer. He served as doctor with the 1st Mountain Division, Commander of a Medical Battalion and Division Commander of the German Military's Medical Academy. Since 1981 Erös had been working with international relief organizations in conflict areas and after catastrophes in India, Pakistan, Bangladesh, Ruanda and Eastern Timor. In 1986 he quit his military service for four years, to serve as a doctor for the civilian population in Afghanistan exposing himself to high risk. During the Bundeswehr's first UN mission abroad in Cambodia, Erös was Commander of a Medical Battalion. From 1996 to 1998 Erös taught as a professor in the faculty for Security Policy at the German Military Command and General Staff College (Führungsakademie). From 1999 to 2001 he was a doctor with the Army Special Operations Divisions. In 2002 he chose to retire early at only 54 years of age, to concentrate on his relief work in Afghanistan. The organization now operates more than 15 schools as well as medical stations. Additionally it offers vocational training and further qualification courses and disaster relief for families in need in Afghanistan and Pakistan.

Erös is a specialist on Afghanistan and speaks Pashtu fluently. He regularly appears on German TV debates on Afghanistan and has held more than 2000 presentations on Afghanistan and his work during the past few years.

== Awards ==
2003

- European Social Prize

2006

- Marion Dönhoff Prize
- Federal Cross of Merit (Officer's Cross)

2010

- Thomas Dehler Prize for Dr. Reinhard and his wife Annette Erös

2011

- Theodor Heuss Preis

2012

- Bavarian Order of Merit for Dr. Reinhard and his wife Annette Erös
- FEC award for Dr. Reinhard and his wife Annette Erös

== Literature ==
- Tee mit dem Teufel - Als deutscher Militärarzt in Afghanistan. Hoffmann & Campe Verlag, 2002, ISBN 3-455-01801-7
- Unter Taliban, Warlords und Drogenbaronen - eine deutsche Familie kämpft für Afghanistan. Hoffmann & Campe Verlag, 2008, ISBN 978-3-455-50074-5
