= Gladys Noel Bates =

African-American civil rights pioneer and educator

- Born: Gladys Winnie Noel; March 26, 1920; McComb, Mississippi
- Died: October 15, 2010 (aged 90); Denver, Colorado
- Occupations: Civil rights pioneer and educator
- Known for: Gladys Noel Bates Teacher-Equalization Pay Suit

Gladys Noel Bates (née Gladys Winnie Noel; March 26, 1920 – October 15, 2010) was an African-American civil rights pioneer, and educator. In 194, she filed a lawsuit, Gladys Noel Bates vs. the State of Mississippi, charging salary discrimination against black teachers and principals. Although the lawsuit was ultimately unsuccessful, it brought enough attention to the issue of wage equality in education to begin to equalize salaries.

== Personal life ==
Bates was born Gladys Winnie Noel on March 26, 1920 in McComb, Mississippi. She was born to parents Andrew Jackson Noel Sr. (1883–1960) and Susie Hallie Davis Noel (1893–1985). Bates was raised and educated in Jackson, Mississippi.

Bates attended Alcorn A&M College from 1937 to 1939. She received a B.A. degree from Tougaloo College in 1942 and a Master's degree from West Virginia State University in 1952. She further studied at the University of Colorado, Denver.

In 1938, Bates married John M. Bates, whom she had met in college. They had two children: Kathryn Sue Bates and John Milton (“Bunky”) Bates Jr.

== Lawsuit ==
The “Gladys Noel Bates Teacher-Equalization Pay Suit” was the first civil rights suit filed in the history of the State of Mississippi. This landmark lawsuit was the forerunner for school desegregation cases of the 1950s.

=== Background ===
In 1948, salaries for black teachers in Mississippi was on the bottom rung of the nation's teacher pay scale. Black teachers were paid one-half the salary of white teachers. In some school districts, the ratio was even lower. The difference in pay was based solely on skin color, even when black and white teachers had equal education, experience and Teacher certification. The Black teachers’ organization in Jackson, Mississippi was the Mississippi Association of Teachers in Colored Schools (MATCS). It later became known as the Mississippi Teachers Association (MTA). MATCS talked with the NAACP leaders about the possibility of filing a lawsuit for equal pay for Black teachers. After many discussions, it was decided that the logical choice for a plaintiff would be Gladys Noel Bates because she was both a teacher and an active officer of the Jackson NAACP.

==== Preparation ====
During the long months of preparation for the lawsuit, all of the parties involved were pledged to absolute silence for they realized a slip of the tongue could result in Mrs. Bates being fired before the suit was filed.

The chief counsel for the NAACP at the time was Thurgood Marshall. Marshall came and met with the small group of MATCS and NAACP representatives in Jackson. Marshall told the group, point blank, that until they secured $5,000, they were not in a position to seriously consider filing a lawsuit.

==== Fundraising ====
In addition to the money needed to file, no public school employee wanted to have in his possession any incriminating evidence which linked him to the suit. Mrs. Bates was often cautioned to keep papers in a safe place so that names of school and association personnel would not be placed in jeopardy.

The teachers decided to raise money for the lawsuit by increasing their membership dues by one dollar. They called this new fund the welfare or benevolent fund. Teachers, when asked by their white superintendents why the increase in dues was necessary, gave the well rehearsed reply that this money was needed for flowers and memorials for illnesses and deaths of black teachers.

The other problem that MATCS and the NAACP faced was how to bank these so-called “welfare” funds. This also had to be done in full secrecy. MATCS opened an account under an assumed name at the Tri-State Bank in Memphis, Tennessee. All litigation expenses connected with the lawsuit were paid from this account.

Additional monies were secured at MATCS meetings by passing a gunny sack around the room. All teachers at the meetings would put their clenched fists inside the sack whether they had money in their hands or not. This was to protect members in case a snitch was in their presence. The snitch would not be able to disclose who had or had not contributed money to the case.

==== Final preparations ====
The next effort was to secure a local attorney to fight the case. For a time this seemed a serious roadblock. The only hope was an elderly man in Meridian, Mississippi, Attorney James A. Burns. He was very frail and it was seriously doubted that his health would permit his undertaking this strenuous physical and emotional case. To Mrs. Bates’ great relief, he replied that he felt taking on this case was the right thing for him to do. He agreed to become the attorney for the Bates’ lawsuit.

Attorney Burns climbed a bus every week to come to Jackson, Mississippi to file papers and research State and municipal records for little more than bus fare and meals. He was paid $1500 for four years of yeoman service to the cause of civil rights.

== Filing and consequences ==
The lawsuit was filed on March 4, 1948. Mrs. Bates and her husband were fired from their teaching positions by the end of the 1948 school year. The Bates, along with her parents and a few teachers who had expressed favorable opinions about the suit, were ostracized from society and fired from their teaching positions as well.

Mr. and Mrs. Bates were not only fired but blacklisted from all public school teaching positions in the state of Mississippi. Gunshots were fired through the windows of the Bates’ home and it was ultimately burned to the ground in 1949.

=== Results ===
==== Legal results ====
This lawsuit was in litigation for four years (1948–1951) until the United States Supreme Court refused to hear the case, not because it was unmerited but, relying on the precedent set by the Cook vs Davis Supreme Court case, it ruled that all administrative remedies had to be exhausted before the case could be heard by the Court. The plaintiff had to first seek relief from the local school board; if not given, then relief should be sought from the county board of education. If no relief was given there, then redress should be sought from the State. This process discouraged people bringing cases as the local school board would terminate their employment at the first step.

==== Long-term results ====
After the Bates filed their lawsuit, Black teachers’ salaries were gradually increased to reach parity with those of white teachers in the State of Mississippi. By 1951, equal salaries were a reality and the lawsuit became moot.

== Awards and honors ==
The Bates received community recognition for their work to increase educational opportunities, mentoring and other community raising activities in Park Hill.

Gladys Bates was the only person to head both the North East Park Hill Civic Association and its successor, the Greater Park Hill Community, Inc. organization.

The John M. and Gladys N. Bates Award recognizes an individual contributions in the areas of human relations, multiculturalism and the field of education.

In 1996, Bates was awarded the Building Community Award by the Colorado Association of Non-Profit Organizations (CANPO). Mayor Wellington Webb of Denver, Colorado declared October 17, 1996, "Gladys Noel Bates Day".

In 2002, she was awarded the President's Award at the National Conference of Black Mayors.

In 2009, a school in Jackson, Mississippi, was named for Bates, and she attended the dedication ceremony.

== Death ==
Galdys Bates died at the age of 90 on October 15, 2010 in Denver, Colorado.

== Accomplishments ==
- Life member National Education Association (NEA)
- member, Colorado Education Association
- National Association for Women Deans, Administrators & Counselors, Denver Colorado
- Denver Administrators and Supervisors Association
- Colorado-Wyoming Association for Women Deans, Administrators and Counselors
- treasurer, Denver Association of Secondary Women in Administration
- past member, Board of Trustees, Tougaloo College
- past president, National Alumni Association, Tougaloo College
- member, Delta Sigma Theta
- past president, Denver Chapter of Links, Inc.
- past member, board of directors, NAACP
- precinct committeewoman and delegate to many Democratic County and State Conventions
- Recipient of National Education Association Human Relation Award, 1974
- Merit Award, Mississippi Teachers Association
- Achievement Award, Alpha Phi Alpha
- Finer Womanhood Award, Zeta Phi Beta
- Pioneer Citation, Delta Sigma Theta
- Testimonial Banquet and Award, Citizens Commission of Jackson, Mississippi
- Plaque of Appreciation, Tougaloo National Alumni Association, 1966
- Teacher of the Year, Denver Blade Newspaper, 1964
- William Funk Community Service Award
- Founding Chair-person of the Greater Park Hill Community's Safe Neighborhood Committee Coalition Against Drugs
- Juanita R. Gray Award for Excellence in Education
- Black women's Political Action Forum (Mississippi)
