= R. Jess Brown =

American lawyer (1912–1989)

- Born: Richard Jess Brown; September 2, 1912; Coffeyville, Kansas, U.S.
- Died: December 31, 1989 (aged 77); Jackson, Mississippi, U.S.
- Education: Illinois State Normal University; Indiana University Bloomington (MEd); Texas Southern University Law School
- Occupations: Civil rights lawyer, teacher

Richard Jess Brown, commonly known as R. Jess Brown (September 2, 1912 – December 31, 1989) was an American civil rights lawyer and teacher. Brown was known for his work in Mississippi with the NAACP Legal Defense and Educational Fund. He was involved in a 1948 civil right lawsuit over discriminatory teacher compensation, and lost his teaching job for signing on to the lawsuit. The experience inspired him to return to school to become a lawyer.

== Early life and education ==
Richard Jess Brown was born on September 2, 1912, in Coffeyville, Kansas, and raised in Muskogee, Oklahoma.

He attended Illinois State Normal University, Indiana University Bloomington (M.Ed. 1942) and the Texas Southern University Law School (now Thurgood Marshall School of Law).

== Career ==
In his early career in the late 1940s, Brown taught industrial arts in Mississippi at Alcorn College, Lanier High School, and Campbell College. He lost a teaching job in 1948 after signing on as a co-plaintiff with Gladys Noel Bates in her lawsuit for equal pay against the Jackson County School District. Brown decided to become a lawyer, and returned to studies at Texas Southern University's law school.

He returned to Mississippi in 1953, and passed the Mississippi bar exam. Brown initially practiced law in Vicksburg and then later in Jackson, Mississippi, where he lived for many years. Attorney James E. Winfield from Vicksburg worked with Brown. During his career he frequently engaged in litigation seeking desegregation of specific Mississippi schools. He represented James Meredith, Mack Charles Parker, and he worked with the NAACP Legal Defense and Educational Fund. Brown defended blacks accused of crimes, challenged laws restricting blacks from voting, and litigated to end the exclusion of blacks from white-only educational institutions in Mississippi.

On April 5, 1963, Brown represented clients seeking to desegregate Leake County, Mississippi schools in the Southern District of Mississippi. He was improperly targeted by Judge Sidney Carr Mize after the district's lawyers submitted an affidavit stating one of the plaintiffs sought to remove herself from the case.

== Death and legacy ==
Brown died at age 77 on December 31, 1989, at Hinds General Hospital in Jackson, Mississippi.

United States legislative bill H.R. 455, a 2017 resolution in the Mississippi House of Representatives, honored him after his death, and sought to rename a courthouse in Jackson, Mississippi in his honor. Representative Bennie Thompson gave testimony on the bill.

Brown was one of the three lawyer featured in the documentary film, The Defenders: How Lawyers Protected the Movement (2023).

The Magnolia Bar Association in Mississippi has an R. Jess Brown Award.
