= Glass site =

Archaeological site in Mississippi, United States

- Location within Mississippi today
- 32°13′46.49″N 90°56′10.032″W
- Cultures: Plaquemine culture
- Location: Vicksburg, Mississippi, U.S.
- Region: Warren County, Mississippi

Site notes
- Excavation dates: 1910–1911, 2007–2009
- Archaeologists: Clarence Bloomfield Moore, Lauren Elizabeth Downs

The Glass site (22 WR 502) is a Plaquemine culture archaeological site located approximately 9.5 kilometres (5.9 mi) south of Vicksburg in Warren County, Mississippi. Originally the site had four platform mounds surrounding a large open plaza, but land leveling for modern farming techniques and looting by pothunters mean only portions of three have survived into the 21st century. It was a major ceremonial center that was contemporaneous with other large Plaquemine sites including Emerald, Holly Bluff, and Winterville and whose main occupation period occurred during the protohistoric period from 1500 to 1650 CE. Parts of the site were excavated by Clarence Bloomfield Moore in 1910 and 1911, and by Lauren Elizabeth Downs in 2007–2009. The mounds are listed on the Mississippi Mound Trail.

== Site chronology ==
The Glass site sits on the northern edge of the area covered by the Natchez Bluff phase, immediately south of the Yazoo Basin phase area and across the Mississippi River from the Tensas Basin area. While it was lightly occupied during the earlier Marksville and Coles Creek eras; its main period of occupation was during the protohistoric Emerald phase from 1500 to 1650 CE. This era saw the site's florescence as a major civic center and the construction of the platform mounds. It was inhabited during the time of the de Soto entrada down the Mississippi River in 1543 and is considered a possible candidate for the polity of "Quigualtam" or the unnamed group encountered by the expedition below Quigualtam; both of which fiercely attacked the Spaniards as they drifted down the river. It was no longer in use by the time of sustained European contact when the French arrived in the 1680s.

Culture	Natchez Bluffs phases	Yazoo Basin phases	Tensas Basin phases	Dates
Historic era	Natchez	Russell (Tunica)	Taensa	1650–1750 CE
Plaquemine/ Mississippian	Emerald	Wasp Lake	Transylvania	1500–1650 CE
Plaquemine/ Mississippian	Foster	Lake George	Fitzhugh	1350–1500 CE
Plaquemine/ Mississippian	Anna	Winterville	Routh	1200–1350 CE
Coles Creek	Crippen Point	Gordon	Preston	1000–1200 CE
Coles Creek	Balmoral	Kings Crossing	Balmoral	850–1000 CE
Coles Creek	Ballina	Aden	Saranac	700–850 CE
Baytown	Sundown	Bayland	Sundown	550–700 CE
Baytown	Hamiton	Deasonville	Marsden	300–550 CE
Marksville	Issaquena	Issaquena	Issaquena/Johnson	100–300 CE
Marksville	Grand Gulf	Anderson Landing	Point Lake	100 BCE–100 CE

== See also ==
- Culture, phase, and chronological table for the Mississippi Valley
