= Mazique Archeological Site =

Archaeological site in Mississippi, US

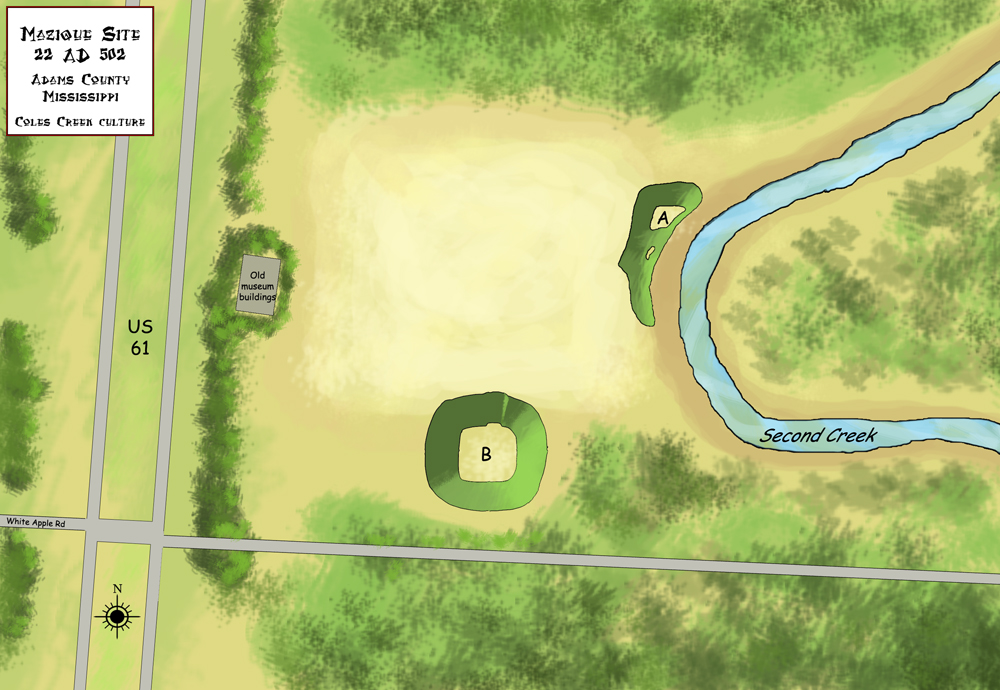
- Layout of the Mazique Archeological Site

- Location within Mississippi today
- 31°24′52.92″N 91°23′18.85″W
- Cultures: Coles Creek culture, Plaquemine Mississippian culture, Natchez people
- Location: Sibley, Mississippi, Adams County, Mississippi, USA
- Region: Adams County, Mississippi

History
- Built: 1000 CE
- Abandoned: 1730

Site notes
- Architectural styles: platform mound, plaza,
- Mazique Archeological Site
- U.S. National Register of Historic Places
- NRHP reference No.: 91001529.
- Added to NRHP: October 23, 1991
- Excavation dates: 1927, 1929, 1948
- Archaeologists: James A. Ford, Moreau B. Chambers, John L. Cotter, W. P. Lancaster

The Mazique Archeological Site (22 AD 502), also known as White Apple Village, is a prehistoric Coles Creek culture archaeological site located in Adams County, Mississippi. It is also the location of the historic period White Apple Village of the Natchez people and the Mazique Plantation. It was added to the NRHP on October 23, 1991, as NRIS number 91001529.

== Description ==
The site is located on the west bank of Second Creek, a tributary of the Homochitto River and consisted of three platform mounds and a central plaza. It was occupied during both the Coles Creek period (700–1000 CE) and the later Plaquemine Mississippian period (1000–1680 CE), when it was recorded in historic times as the White Apple village of the Natchez. Mound A sits directly on the bank of Second Creek and more than half of its mass has been lost due to the creek eroding into it. It is currently 8 metres (26 ft) in height but was recorded as being 6.1 metres (20 ft) in height and 45.7 metres (150 ft) in circumference by Montroville W. Dickeson in 1841 and 5.5 metres (18 ft) in height and 40 metres (131 ft) in length on the top by Calvin Brown in 1916. Mound B is located to the southeast and is 4 metres (13 ft) in height and has a historic cemetery on its summit. It still retains its flat topped shape. Dickeson was the only one to mention the third mound, which he described as smaller than the others and being further reduced by cultivation of its surface. By the time of the other surveys and investigations it is no longer mentioned and its location is still under investigation. The site is named for a local African-American family from southern Adams County who once owned the land.

== Excavations ==
Mazique was visited in 1927 and 1929 by James A. Ford and Moreau B. Chambers, who performed a site survey and surface collection of ceramic fragments of Plaquemine culture pottery. Analysis of these fragments were used to date the site to the Coles Creek period. The first archaeological excavations at the site were in 1940 by the Natchez Historical Association at the instigation of local tourism promoter and entrepreneur Jefferson Davis Dickson Jr. Dickson then had a short-lived "archaeological museum" built on the site during the early 1940s, which caused serious damage. The site was again excavated in 1948 by John L. Cotter and W. P. Lancaster.

== White Apple Village ==
White Apple Village had three different actual sites, which were each occupied at different times. The first was near Washington, Mississippi, the second in Franklin County, Mississippi, and the third at the present location of the Mazique site. By the early 1700s, the Natchez had developed internal pro-British and pro-French factions. The pro-French faction was led by the tribal chief The Great Sun and his brother the Tattooed Serpent, and was based in the Grand Village of the Natchez and supported by the villages of Flour and Tioux. These villages were in the southwestern part of Natchez territory near the Mississippi River and closer to the location of French contact. The pro-English faction's villages lay to the northeast, closer to the Chickasaw and English contact, and further from the river.

The pro-English villages included White Apple, Jenzenaque, and Grigra. When violence broke out between the Natchez and the French, the village of White Apple was usually the main instigator of the hostility. This factional infighting was a holdover of pre-European local politics, when various groups vied for supremacy over the polity. This had caused the main Natchez political leadership to switch amongst various sites throughout the years; at times being located at Anna, Emerald, Foster, Mazique, or the Fatherland sites.

The First Natchez War (1716) began when raiders from White Apple killed four French traders. After the war, the French built Fort Rosalie near the Grand Village, considered the beginning of Natchez, Mississippi. In 1722 and 1723, war (Second and Third Natchez Wars) again broke out when in White Apple an argument over a debt resulted in a French trader's murder of one of the Natchez villagers. Unsatisfied with the French commander's reprimand of the murderer, the warriors of White Apple retaliated by attacking nearby French settlements until Tattooed Serpent's diplomatic efforts restored the peace. Within a year, a French army intent on punishing the warriors of White Apple demanded the surrender of a White Apple chief as recompense for the earlier Natchez attacks. Under pressure from the French and other Natchez villages, White Apple turned the chief over. When in the late 1720s both the elder Great Sun and Tattooed Serpent died, the chief of White Apple became the eldest Sun chief and had more political clout than the newly installed Great Sun, nephew of the previous Great Sun. The French continued to hold this new Great Sun responsible for the conduct of all Natchez villages and insisted on dealing with the Natchez people as a unified nation ruled from its capital, even though in reality this was not the situation.

In 1729, the new French commander, Sieur de Chépart, ordered the emptying of White Apple so that he could use its land for a new tobacco plantation. This was the final affront to the Natchez. The chiefs of White Apple sent emissaries to potential allies, including the Yazoo, Koroa, Illinois, Chickasaw, and Choctaw. They also sent messages to enslaved Africans of nearby French plantations, inviting them to join the Natchez in rising up to drive out the French. The Natchez destroyed the French settlements in their territory. In retaliation, the French eventually killed or enslaved most of the Natchez people. Overshadowing the first three in scale and importance, this war is usually called simply the Natchez War.
