= Quigualtam =

Native American polity of uncertain origins, in present-day Louisiana and Arkansas

Quigualtam or Quilgualtanqui was a powerful Native American Plaquemine culture polity encountered in 1542–1543 by the Hernando de Soto expedition. The capital of the polity and its chieftain also bore the same name; although neither the chief nor his settlements were ever visited in person by the expedition. Their encounters consisted of messages sent by runners and a three-day-long canoe battle on the Mississippi River. Multiple archaeological cultures, archaeological sites, and protohistoric and early historic period Native American groups have been proposed by historians and archaeologists to identify the polity, but their identity will probably never be known with any degree of certainty. The chroniclers of the DeSoto expedition said the chiefdoms near the Mississippi River, especially Guigualtam, were the best they encountered during their three-year journey through the southeastern United States.

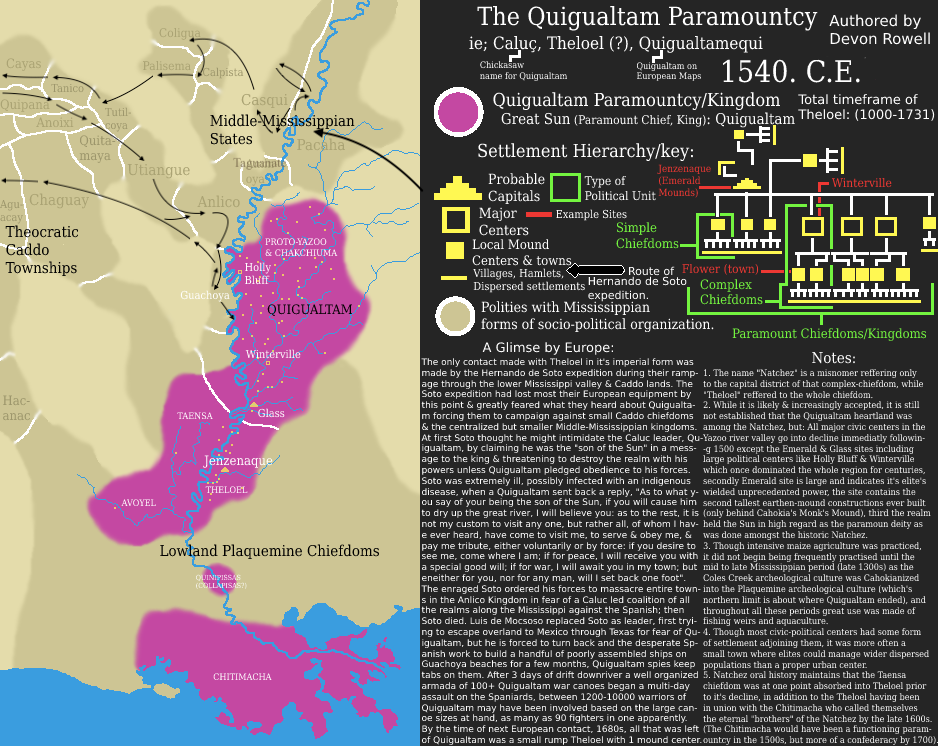
Map of the Quigualtam Paramountcy in 1540 CE.

== De Soto journals ==
=== 1542: Messages with Quigualtam ===
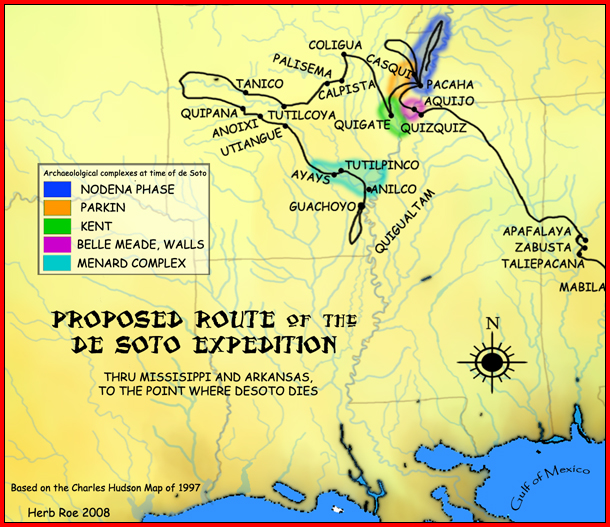
Hudson's proposed de Soto route through Arkansas

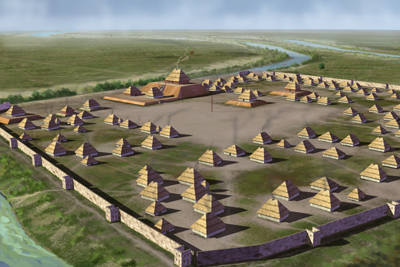
Artist's conception of the Parkin site, circa 1539

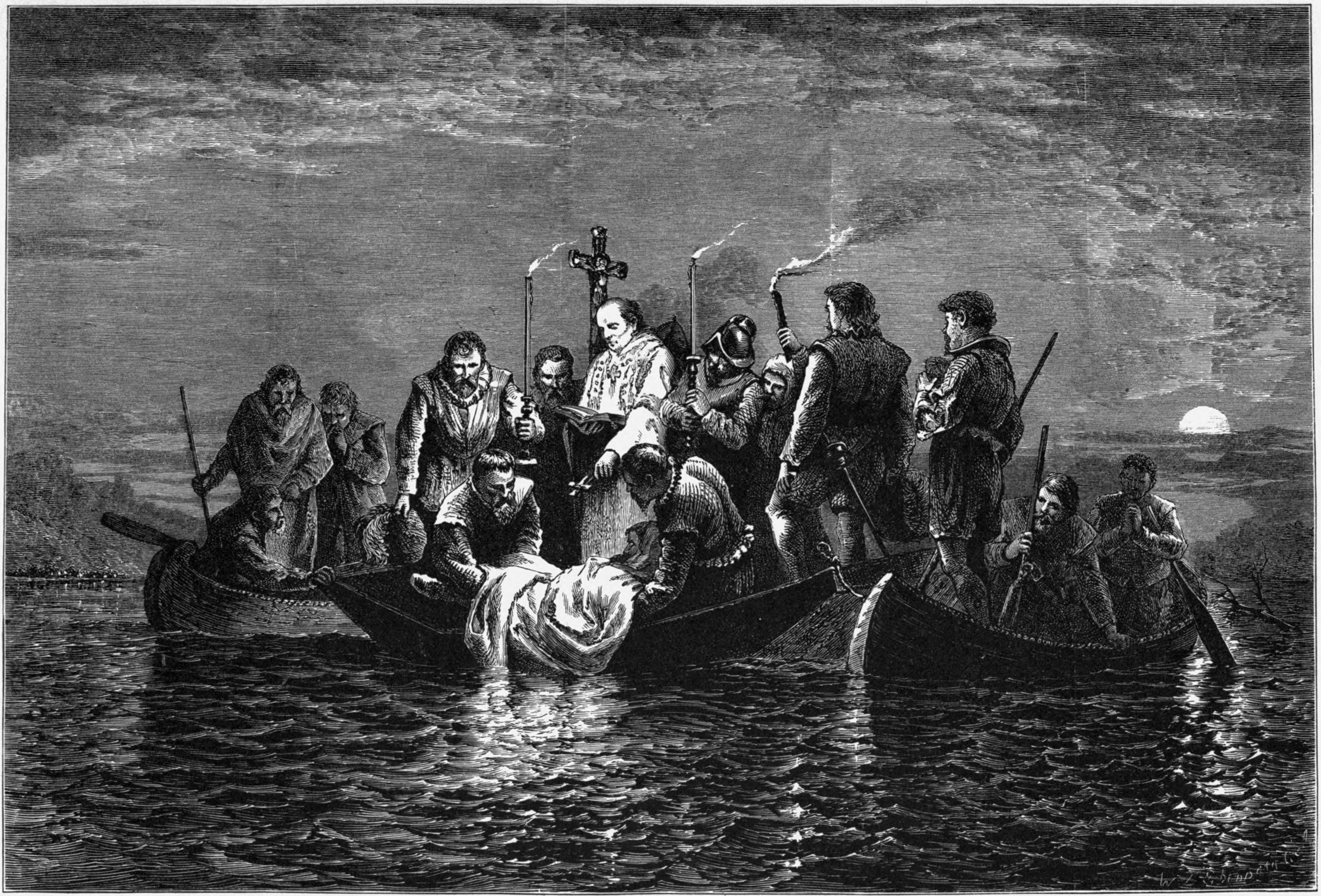
Romanticized depiction of the burial of de Soto by William A. Crafts, 1876

The journals of the Spanish expedition of Hernando de Soto record their encounter with a powerful chiefdom located on the eastern bank of the Mississippi River several days journey below the polity of Guachoya (in present-day Chicot County, Arkansas). By this point the expedition had been traversing the southeast for several years and had spent the majority of the previous year in the area of the modern state of Arkansas among the Late Mississippian culture paramount chiefdoms of Quizquiz, Casqui, and Pacaha, as well as their many vassal states. Modern archaeological research has placed the capital of Casqui at the Parkin site and equated the polity of Pacaha with the Nodena phase.

Not finding the precious metals and gems the Europeans desired, the expedition left eastern Arkansas and headed west across central Arkansas and into the Ozark Mountains in their search for riches. Finding nothing they considered of value and contending with considerable native resistance; de Soto and his men returned to the Mississippi River, where they found the maize-rich polities of Guachoya and Anilco (thought by some archaeologists and historians to be the Menard–Hodges site in modern-day Arkansas County, Arkansas). After encountering resistance from Anilco and entreaties of alliance from their traditional enemies, the Guachoya; de Soto made his headquarters at Guachoya.

De Soto interrogated the chief about the societies living downstream, hoping to find a rich "province" to conquer, where he could set up the colony he had delayed founding in his search for more portable valuables. By this time de Soto had begun employing a ruse with the native populations; seeking to convince them that he was an immortal deity, "son of the sun". After learning of Quigualtum, de Soto sent a message demanding his obeisance and to bring him examples of the most valuable thing in his land; presumably the gold or other riches valued by Europeans. Before a reply could return, de Soto fell seriously ill and took to his bed.

Quigualtum sent back a message that astonished and infuriated de Soto:

"As to what you say of your being the son of the Sun, if you will cause him to dry up the great river, I will believe you: as to the rest, it is not my custom to visit any one, but rather all, of whom I have ever heard, have come to visit me, to serve and obey me, and pay me tribute, either voluntarily or by force: if you desire to see me, come where I am; if for peace, I will receive you with special good will; if for war, I will await you in my town; but neither for you, nor for any man, will I set back one foot"

— Quigualtam, 1542

Angered by the chief's arrogant response but by then too weak to get up from his bed, de Soto could not mount an armed response. Afterward followed a period with Anilco and other local towns conspiring with Quigualtum to mount a combined attack against the Spaniards. In order to strike fear into Quigualtum and the others, and to punish Anilco, from his deathbed he ordered his men to massacre all of the men of Anilco. His men obeyed and did not stop with killing the men; they were said to have massacred women and children as well. DeSoto died of his illness a few days later in May 1542, in what is believed to be the vicinity of modern-day McArthur, Arkansas. His body was weighted down with sand and under cover of darkness consigned to a watery grave in the Mississippi River. In order to keep the ruse up and forestall possible attacks, his men informed the local peoples that de Soto had ascended into the sky but would return. His remaining men, now commanded by his aide de camp Moscoso, decided to attempt an overland journey to Mexico in order to avoid sailing downriver. They made it as far as Texas, meeting Late Caddoan Mississippian peoples along the way, before running into territory too dry for maize farming and too thinly populated to sustain themselves by stealing food from the locals. The expedition had to backtrack to Guachoya.

=== 1543: Mississippi River battle ===
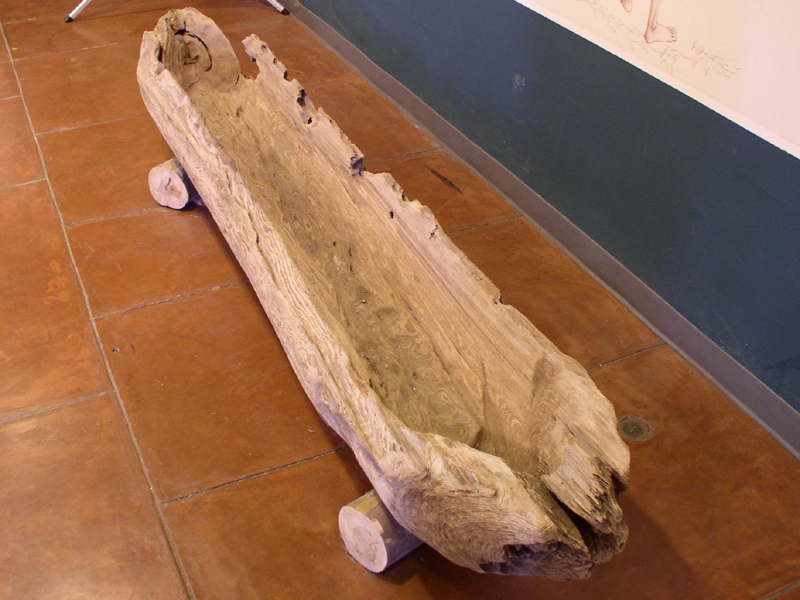
Small prehistoric canoe on display at the Winterville onsite museum

They spent the winter of 1542–1543 building a small fleet of seven "bergantines", or pinnaces, to attempt the river route to the Gulf of Mexico and on to Mexico. Once the spring floods had abated, they headed down the Mississippi River on July 2, 1543. After sailing for several days, the expedition came upon a great fleet of over one hundred war canoes. Made from enormous hollowed-out cypress logs, the larger canoes were big enough to seat 60 to 70 passengers. They had ranks of seated paddlers, 20–30 per side, with a standing warrior armed with bow and arrows stationed between each one. Some of the larger canoes were also color coded, with the canoes, oars, and the clothing and weaponry of the crew all painted the same color. Although many of the canoes were not this large, their crews still moved with precision, speed, and skill. Seated in several of the great canoes were the fleet commanders, chiefs with awnings to shade and protect them from the sun, one of them possibly Quigualtam himself.

Under the pretense of negotiating, the canoes attacked the Spanish. Over the course of the running battle, eleven Spaniards were killed and many more wounded as the expedition fled downstream. The war canoe crews chanted war songs, whose rhythm and speed set the speed of the paddling of their craft. The songs glorified their prowess in battle and extolled their courage. The songs also lambasted the Spaniards as cowards and thieves who would soon perish; that on land their corpses had been food for dogs and birds and that on the river they would feed the fish. The songs frequently mentioned the name of their great chief Quigualtam and, at the end of each song, the singers would give a great shout of triumph. The Spaniards no longer had long-range offensive weapons. The gunpowder for their arquebuses had run out long before and the guns melted down to make nails for the boats; the limited number of crossbows had mostly stopped working as well. The Spaniards placed their armor and cane matting around the boats' gunwales to protect from the arrows. The Native Americans began arcing their arrows into the air so they came straight down and injured more of the Spaniards. The fleet chased them for several days, rarely letting up on their attack on the Spaniards.

On the third day, the Spanish reached the edge of their attackers' territory. The war fleet turned around and headed back upriver, continuing to chant and shout the name of their leader. Within a day the expedition encountered another fleet of canoes belonging to a powerful but unnamed chiefdom. These warriors also gave chase downriver for several days until the foreigners had left their territory. After one more encounter with a small native group near the coast, the expedition finally made it to the Gulf on July 16, 1543, a few weeks after they had left Guachoya.

== Proposed identifications ==
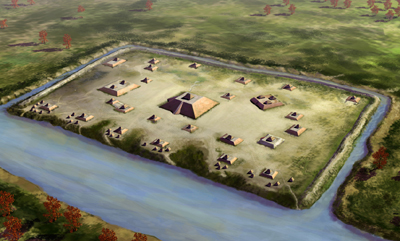
Holly Bluff site

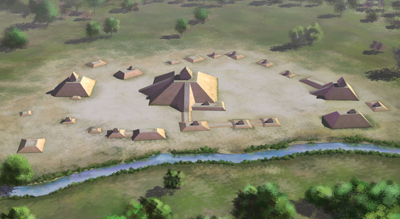
Winterville site, near Greenville, Mississippi

Various scholars have proposed and debated the identities of Quigualtam and the unnamed chiefdom and the exact locations of their polities. Historian Charles M. Hudson has suggested that Quigualtam was centered on the area surrounding the Holly Bluff or Winterville sites in the lower Yazoo Basin. Archeologists believe that these two large Plaquemine culture sites had been abandoned by this time; the capital of the polity had probably shifted to another of the numerous sites within its territory.

Other scholars have proposed the Glass site and Emerald Mound as possibilities for the two polities. The Glass site is on the flood plain between the Mississippi River and the Natchez Bluffs, approximately 9.5 kilometres (5.9 mi) south of modern Vicksburg. It was on the northern edge of the Emerald Phase (1500–1680) of the protohistoric Natchez chiefdom. During this period, its capital was located at the massive Emerald Mound near modern-day Stanton, Mississippi. These two sites were the only major ceremonial centers on this stretch of the Mississippi River occupied during the protohistoric period from 1500 to 1650 CE. Since the Spaniards never made it ashore to leave archaeological evidence of contact with these two groups, their exact identity will probably never be determined with certainty.

No further recorded European contact with the indigenous people in this area occurred for almost 140 years, until the first French explorers reached the area in the 1680s. By the historic period, power had shifted within the Natchez polity from Emerald Mound to the Grand Village of the Natchez, and the Glass site had also been abandoned.

In the meantime native peoples of the region suffered from epidemics of infectious disease. They contracted these from members of the de Soto expedition, among whom the diseases were endemic, and indirectly from other Native Americans who had contact with European traders on the Gulf coast. The Spaniards' technique of using local rivalries to their advantage had upset the delicate political balance between native groups, who had existed in a state of low-level endemic warfare between polities for generations. In addition, a series of disastrous multi-year droughts spanned the latter half of the 16th century.

Many societies in the region began to collapse. Remnant populations of Mississippian peoples began migrating across and down the Mississippi, sometimes settling in areas recently deserted by Plaquemine peoples, and at other times displacing or merging with the Plaquemine populations on the lower river. The Plaquemine culture contracted southward and abandoned the northern Natchez Bluffs altogether. The Lower Yazoo basin region, once occupied by the Winterville and Holly Bluff polity, became the territory of the historic period Yazoo, Tunica and Koroa tribes. They had migrated from further upriver, thought by archaeologists to be the descendants of Quizquiz and other polities encountered by de Soto in the Memphis area, who were escaping the destruction of their societies left in de Soto's wake. The Tioux and Grigra divisions of the Natchez were recent additions, also Tunica speakers from up the river who had been adopted into the Natchez tribe.

== See also ==
- List of sites and peoples visited by the Hernando de Soto Expedition
- Mississippian shatter zone
- Natchez
- Taensa
- Tunica
