= Anna site =

Plaquemine culture archaeological site in Adams County, Mississippi, U.S.

Anna Site
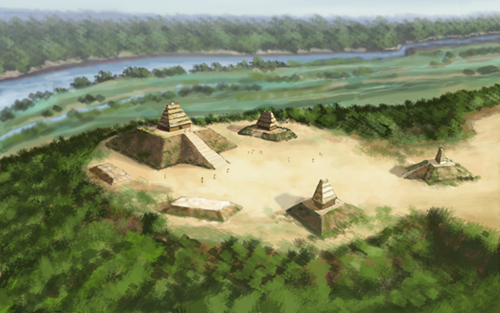
- Artist's conception of the Anna Site

- Location in Mississippi today
- 31°41′43.37″N 91°20′59.17″W
- Periods: Anna phase
- Cultures: Plaquemine culture
- Location: Natchez, Mississippi, Adams County, Mississippi, USA
- Region: Adams County, Mississippi

History
- Built: 1200
- Abandoned: 1500

Site notes
- Architectural style: platform mound Number of temples: 8
- Anna Site
- U.S. National Register of Historic Places
- U.S. National Historic Landmark
- NRHP reference No.: 93001606

Significant dates
- Added to NRHP: September 14, 1993
- Designated NHL: September 14, 1993
- Excavation dates: 1924, 1997
- Archaeologists: Warren K. Moorehead, James A. Ford, Jesse D. Jennings, John L. Cotter
- Responsible body: Private

The Anna Site is a prehistoric Plaquemine culture archaeological site located in Adams County, Mississippi, 10 miles (16 km) north of Natchez. It is the type site for the Anna phase (1200 to 1350 CE) of the Natchez Bluffs Plaquemine culture chronology. It was declared a National Historic Landmark on September 14, 1993.

== Description ==
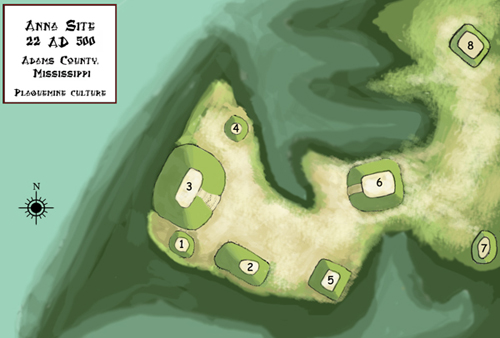
Layout of the mounds

The Anna Site is located on a bluff above the Mississippi River, about 10 miles (16 km) north of Natchez, Mississippi. The site consists of eight platform mounds, six of which are situated around a central plaza. The main group of six mounds sits near the bluff, with the largest being Mound 3. It is 50 feet (15 m) in height and sits directly on the edge of the bluff overlooking the river. A ramp runs down the front of this mound onto the plaza area and toward a smaller mound (Mound 5) which is about 300 feet (91 m) away and measures 12 feet (3.7 m) in height. A small mound (Mound 4) sits adjacent (northeasterly) to Mound 3, just off the plaza. Excavations of this mound have found evidence of a summit structure. Another small mound (Mound 1) sits in a similar position on the southern side of Mound 3. Mound 2 flanks the plaza in between Mound 1 and Mound 5. Mounds 3, 2 and 5 are situated parallel to the plaza area, but Mound 6 is diagonally positioned. Mound 6 also has remnants of a ramp. Two other mounds (Mounds 7 and 8) are situated to the east and northeast of the main group. Deep ravines surround the mounds, and material, including Plaquemine culture pottery, is scattered in the area.

== History ==
The construction of the Anna Site began c. 1200, corresponding to the beginning of the interaction among various Lower and Middle Mississippi cultures, leading to the formation of the Plaquemine culture. There were minor occupations at the site but the most significant period of occupation at the site starts during the Gordon phase 1000–1200 of the Coles Creek period (700–1200). Mound construction may have begun during this period but had definitely begun by the succeeding Anna phase (1200 to 1350) and continued through the Foster phase (1350–1500) and Emerald phase (1500 to 1680). This 300-year period saw the transformation of the site into a regionally significant multi-mound center, possibly ruled over by a burgeoning hereditary elite class. The site was occupied until c. 1500.

There is no indication that the site was later reoccupied. The site was excavated in 1924 by archaeologists Warren K. Moorehead and Calvin S. Brown. James A. Ford, Jesse D. Jennings and John L. Cotter also worked at the site at different times over the next fifty years. The site was recommended by both Ford and Jennings to the State of Mississippi for purchase and future excavation and as a property for an archaeological museum, but the recommendations were not followed through. Cotter's 1951 excavations and analysis of the site were important in establishing the phases for the Natchez Bluffs chronology. The Gulf Coast Survey and the Alabama Museum of Natural History conducted joint excavations in 1997 and reaffirmed the previous chronological placement of the site.

== See also ==
- List of National Historic Landmarks in Mississippi
- National Register of Historic Places listings in Adams County, Mississippi
