= Atchafalaya Basin Mounds =

Archaeological site in Louisiana, US

- Location within Louisiana today
- 29°43′21.07″N 91°17′56.868″W
- Cultures: Coastal Coles Creek, Plaquemine, Chitimacha
- Location: Patterson, Louisiana
- Region: St. Mary Parish, Louisiana

History
- Built: 980 CE
- Abandoned: 18th century

Site notes
- Architectural style: platform mounds
- Archaeologists: Clarence Bloomfield Moore

The Atchafalaya Basin Mounds (16 SMY 10) (variously known as the Patterson Mounds, Patterson site, Moro Plantation Mounds and as the protohistoric village of Qiteet Kuti´ngi Na´mu by the Chitimacha Tribe of Louisiana) is an archaeological site originally occupied by peoples of the Coastal Coles Creek and Plaquemine cultures beginning around 980 CE, and by their presumed historic period descendants, the Chitimacha, during the 18th century. It is located in St. Mary Parish, Louisiana on the northern bank of Bayou Teche at its confluence with the Lower Atchafalaya River. It consists of several earthen platform mounds and a shell midden situated around a central plaza. The site was visited by Clarence Bloomfield Moore in 1913.

== Description ==
All of the features at the site are badly eroded, sustaining damage over the years from natural forces, pot hunters, and joy riders on ATVs. The site currently consists of three platform mounds and a raised shell midden ringing a rectangular central plaza area. A fourth mound at the southern edge of the site may have existed; but over time has been eroded away into the adjacent Bayou Teche. The plaza area, delineated by the mounds and shell midden, covers approximately .44 hectares (1.1 acres). Located at the western corner of the plaza is Mound A, the largest of the existing mounds. It is approximately 2.8 metres (9.2 ft) in height and 30 metres (98 ft) in diameter. Mound B, at 2.4 metres (7.9 ft) in height, is located 25 metres (82 ft) to the northeast. 30 metres (98 ft) to the southeast of Mound B is Mound C, a low rectangular platform .8 metres (2.6 ft) in height, although it may have once been much taller. An elevated area that extends from the base of Mound A along the southwestern edge of the plaza toward the southeast is a shell midden consisting of high concentrations of Rangia cuneata shell, grog-tempered Plaquemine culture pottery sherds and other artifacts. Its terminus at the southern point of the plaza may have been the location of a fourth mound possibly described in early accounts of the site. The combined area of the mounds and plaza covers 1.2 hectares (3.0 acres), although village habitation areas are thought to have existed outside this main precinct.

== See also ==
- Medora site
- Morgan Mounds
- Culture, phase, and chronological table for the Mississippi Valley
