= Mississippi Mound Trail =

Official Logo

The Mississippi Mound Trail is a driving tour of 33 sites adjoining U.S. Route 61 where indigenous peoples of the Mississippi Delta built earthworks. The mounds were primarily built between 500 and 1500 AD, but are representative of a variety of cultures known as the Mound Builders. Each site has a historical marker and is accessible by road.

Opened in 2016, the trail was a joint venture between the Mississippi Department of Archives and History, the Mississippi Department of Transportation and various other stakeholders.

== Mississippi Mound Trail sites ==
Mound name	Mound location	Listed on NRHP	Photograph	Notes
Aden Mounds	Near Valley Park at 32°38′13.09″N 90°50′10.82″W	Yes		Type site for the Aden Phase (800–900 CE) of Lower Yazoo Basin Coles Creek culture chronology
Anguilla Mound	Anguilla at 32°58′21″N 90°50′29″W	No		Site consists of a single mound
Arcola Mounds	Near Arcola at 33°14′42″N 90°52′55″W	Yes		Only three of the original six mounds exist today.
Batesville Mounds	Batesville at 34°20′51″N 89°55′25″W	Yes		Originally consisted of seven mounds, with only four currently visible. Listed as a Mississippi Landmark. The Batesville Mounds listed on the National Register of Historic Places in 1989.
Bayou Pierre Mounds	Near Port Gibson at 31°58′56″N 91°00′17″W	Yes		Consists of three mounds (and possibly a fourth)
Beaverdam Mounds	Near Evansville at 34°37′44″N 90°23′39″W	Yes		Site consists of two earthen mounds and a former village
Carson Mounds	Stovall at 34°17′37.4″N 90°40′16.04″W	Yes		Only five of the original seven mounds currently exist
Carter Mounds	Near Rolling Fork at 32°55′22.6″N 90°53′00.3″W	No		Site consists of a platform mound and burial mound
Cary Mounds	Cary at 32°48′14.5″N 90°55′53.0″W	Yes		Only one of four original mounds exists today
Christmas Mound	Near Beulah at 33°46′10.6″N 90°58′43.6″W	No		Consists of a single mound with a private cemetery located atop the mound.
Dunn Mounds	Near Lyon at 34°12′58.7″N 90°28′32.7″W	No		Site consists of three mounds
Edgefield Mounds	Near Norfolk at 34°59′32.5″N 90°12′52.8″W	No		Consists of three mounds
Emerald Mound	Stanton at 31°38′9.98″N 91°14′50.02″W	Yes		Type site for the Emerald Phase (1500 to 1680 CE) of the Natchez Bluffs Plaquemine culture chronology and second-largest Mississippian period earthwork in the country. Also a National Historic Landmark
Evansville Mounds	Evansville at 34°38′19.6″N 90°23′32.8″W	Yes		Originally consisted of four mounds but only two remain. An abandoned schoolhouse is located on Mound B.
Foster Mounds	Near Washington at 31°36′03.4″N 90°19′40.9″W	Yes		Consists of two mounds. An antebellum home is located on Mound A.
Grace Mounds	Grace at 32°59′23.4″N 90°58′12.6″W	Yes		Only two of the original five mounds currently exist
Glass Mounds	Warrenton at 32°13′49.1″N 90°56′09.6″W	No		Possibly consisted of five mounds but only three are currently intact
Grand Village of the Natchez	Natchez at 32°31′25.0″N 91°22′46.4″W	Yes		Originally contained six mounds, but only three are intact today. Occupied by the Natchez until 1730. Listed as a National Historic Landmark.
Haynes Bluff Mounds	Near Redwood at 32°31′26.9″N 90°46′47.0″W	No		Originally consisted of four mounds but only two remain today
Hollywood Mounds	Near Hollywood at 34°46′39.2″N 90°22′13.7″W	No		Originally consisted of one large mound and multiple boundary mounds, but only the platform mound and three boundary mounds remain today. Also a Mississippi Landmark.
Jaketown Mounds	Near Deovolente at 33°14′13.542″N 90°29′13.2936″W	Yes		Once consisted of eighteen mounds but only three are visible today. Also a Mississippi Landmark and National Historic Landmark.
Johnson Cemetery Mound	Hollywood at 34°44′27.0″N 90°21′57.5″W	Yes		Site consists of a mound and accompanying village. A private cemetery is located on the mound.
Law Mounds	Foote at 33°05′17.0″N 91°01′09.1″W	No		Only one of the original three mounds exists today.
Lake George Mounds	Holly Bluff at 32°48′51.2″N 90°41′02.5″W	Yes		Consisted of up to twenty eight mounds but only a few are currently visible. Listed as a National Historic Landmark.
Lessley Mound	Near Woodville at 31°09′30.2″N 91°26′25.9″W	No		Site consists of a single mound with the Lessley family cemetery located atop the mound
Mont Helena Mounds	Near Rolling Fork at 32°56′39.6″N 90°52′12.7″W	No		Possibly consisted of three mounds, but only one exists today. A Victorian neoclassical home currently sits atop the mound.
Pocahontas Mounds	Pocahontas, Mississippi at 32°28′9.37″N 90°17′17.81″W	Yes		Site contains two mounds. Also listed as a Mississippi Landmark.
Rolling Fork Mounds	Rolling Fork at 32°53′47.7″N 90°52′44.0″W	Yes		Originally consisted of three mounds but only two remain today
Salomon Mounds	Near Coahoma at 34°22′39.3″N 90°29′24.2″W	Yes		Possibly consisted of twelve mounds, but only three exist today. A private cemetery is located atop Mound A.
Smith Creek Mounds	Near Fort Adams at 31°08′22.0″N 91°30′59.1″W	Yes		Site consists of three mounds
Swan Lake Mounds	Near Foote at 33°05′58.0″N 90°59′54.5″W	No		Originally included four mounds but only two exist today
Windsor Mounds	Bruinsburg at 31°56′45.2″N 91°07′36.4″W	Yes		Site consists of four mounds with a private cemetery located on Mound C.
Winterville Mounds	Near Winterville at 33°29′9″N 91°3′40″W	Yes		Originally consisted of more than twenty mounds. Listed as a Mississippi Landmark and National Historic Landmark.

Source: Mississippi Mound Trail official web site
