= Sims site =

Archaeological site in Louisiana, US

- Location within Louisiana today
- 29°51′17.46″N 90°27′11.52″W
- Cultures: Coastal Coles Creek culture, Plaquemine Mississippian culture
- Location: Paradis, Louisiana, Saint Charles Parish, Louisiana, USA
- Region: Saint Charles Parish, Louisiana

History
- Built: 850 CE
- Abandoned: 1700

Site notes
- Excavation dates: 1978, 1979, 1980

The Sims site (16SC2), also known as Sims Place site, is an archaeological site located in Saint Charles Parish, Louisiana, near the town of Paradis. The location is a multi-component mound and village complex with platform mounds and extensive midden deposits. The site habitations are divided into three periods. It was first inhabited about 800 CE by peoples of the Coastal Coles Creek culture. By 1100 CE the culture of the site had transitioned into the Mississippianized Plaquemine culture that lasted until 1450 CE. A little later was a Late Mississippian/protohistoric period that lasted from 1500 until about 1700 or 1800.

== Site description ==
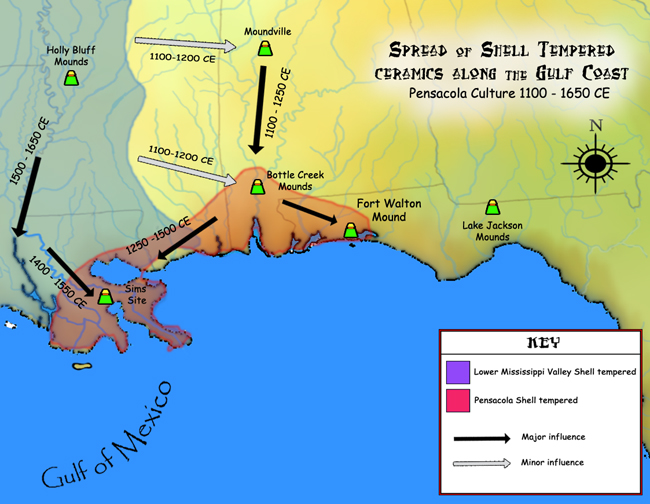
Connection of Sims site to other Mississippian peoples

The large site is located along both banks of a small stream known as Bayou Saut d'Ours and at one time had five to six earthen mounds, but only two mounds and the remains of a third mound are visible today. Mound A is topped by a historic period cemetery. It was one of the largest if not the largest site in the vicinity during the time of its occupation and likely served as a local civic and ceremonial center as well as being a center of trade. The inhabitants traded their local marine resources, including such locally produced items as shells and shell beads, to peoples located further up the Lower Mississippi River valley.

The local use of Plaquemine culture pottery grog tempering for pottery and the gradual adoption of shell tempered pottery associated with other areas has allowed archaeologists to track trade interactions with the people of the Sims site and peoples from these other areas. During the second occupation period trade expanded, and the local ceramics show connections to Lower Mississippi Valley peoples and Plaquemine peoples located near modern-day Barataria Bay and to peoples of the Pensacola culture, located on the upper Gulf Coast near what is modern-day Biloxi, Mississippi. This period, between 1100 and 1450 CE, was during the initial phases of occupation and expansion of the Bottle Creek site, the major center of the Pensacola culture. This period also sees the most significant Plaquemine connections at the site. The next phase sees increasing contact with Mississipianized Plaquemine peoples from as far up the Mississippi River as the Baton Rouge area, as well as continued interaction with the Mississippian Pensacola peoples.

== See also ==
- List of Mississippian sites
- Bayou Grande Cheniere Mounds
- Medora site
