= Fairchild Creek (Mississippi) =

Stream in Jefferson County

Coordinates: 31.74754°N 91.31360°W

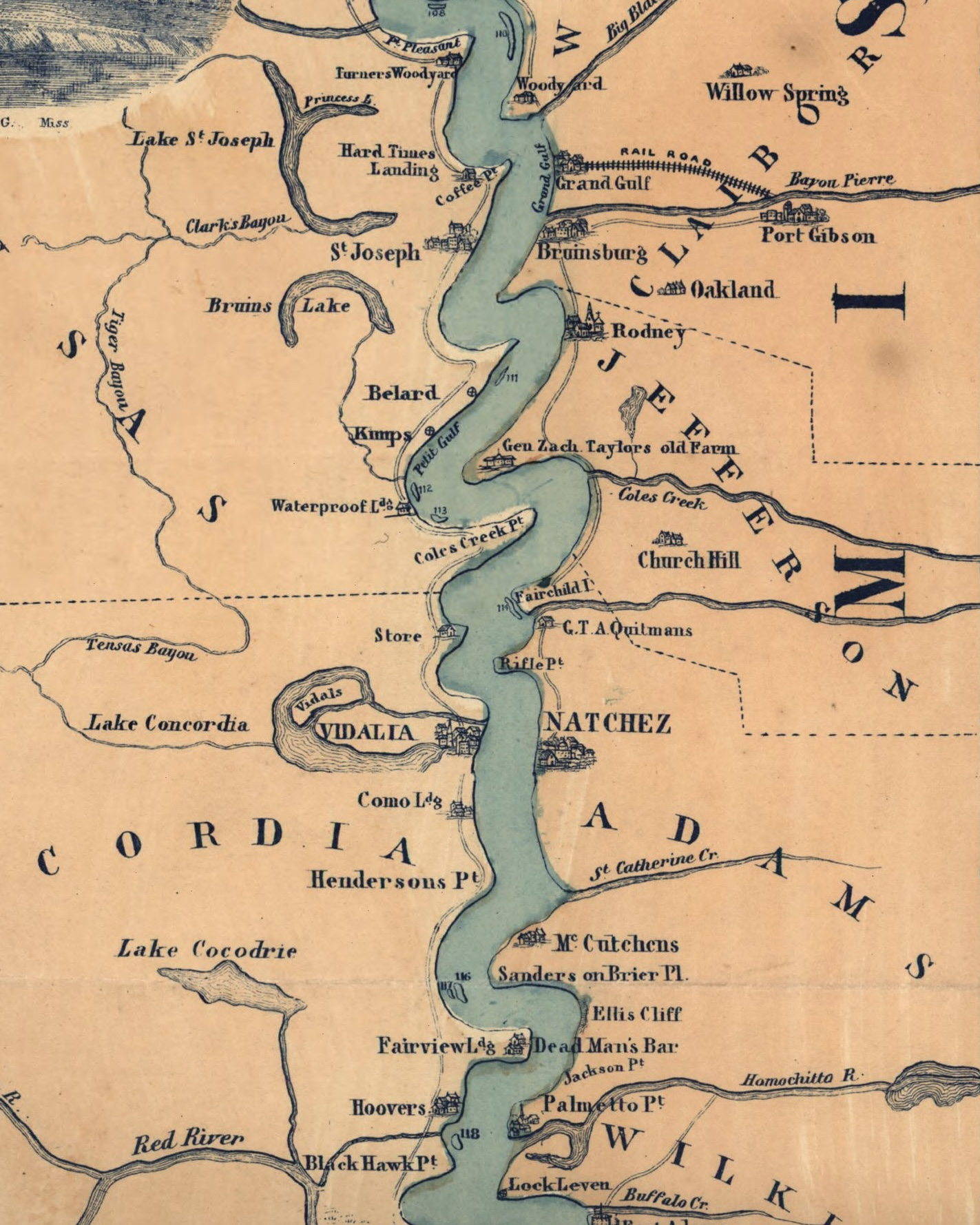
Landmarks in the vicinity of Vicksburg, Vidalia, and Natchez c. 1863 including Fairchild Creek, adjacent to Fairchild Island

Fairchild Creek is a stream located in Adams County and Jefferson County, Mississippi, United States. The Emerald village of the Natchez people was situated along Fairchild Creek. A number of the earliest land claims in Mississippi Territory, based on British and Spanish grants, were located along Fairchild Creek. The Fairchild Creek Bridge, built in 1930, is listed on the National Register of Historic Places.
