= Ghost site =

Archaeological site in Tensas Parish, Louisiana, United States

- Location within Louisiana today
- 32°5′34.5″N 91°27′1.7″W
- Cultures: Coles Creek culture, Plaquemine culture
- Location: Newellton, Louisiana, Tensas Parish, Louisiana, United States
- Region: Tensas Parish, Louisiana

History
- Built: 700 AD
- Abandoned: 1541

The Ghost site (16 TE 18), or Ghost site mounds is an archaeological site in Tensas Parish, Louisiana, with an early to middle Coles Creek culture component (700–1200 AD) and a Late Coles Creek to Plaquemine culture component (1200 to 1541 AD).

== Description ==
The site has three surviving mounds and could have had as many as five. Mound A, the largest mound, is an 11 feet (3.4 m) in height and 118 feet (36 m) by 92 feet (28 m) platform mound. The mound has been used historically as a cemetery. Since 1990 considerable erosion has damaged the mound, after portions of it were removed to build a dam across a nearby bayou. The other two remaining mounds are small dome-shaped mounds less than 2 feet (0.61 m) tall and about 60 feet (18 m) by 90 feet (27 m) at their bases. Mound B was also partially removed for the dam project, but Mound C is still intact. Two other small rises still exist (Mound D and Mound E), but it is unclear if they were mounds or natural features.

== Excavations ==
Limited archaeological testing has been done at the site. Bone, shell, ceramics, and charcoal were found underneath Mounds A and B, and based on decorative elements on the pottery they are dated 700–1200 during the Early to Middle Coles Creek period. Other examples were found in Mounds B and C that have been dated to 1200 to 1541 during the Plaquemine period.

== Location ==
The site is located along highway La 4 0.4 miles (0.64 km) east from its junction with La 128. It is verges on a bayou that flows into the Tensas River.

== See also ==
- Culture, phase, and chronological table for the Mississippi Valley
- Balmoral Mounds
- Flowery Mound
- Routh Mounds
- Sundown Mounds
