= Plaquemine culture =

Archaeological culture in the lower Mississippi River Valley, United States

- Alternative names: Plaquemine Mississippian
- Geographical range: Lower Mississippi Valley Gulf Coast
- Period: Mississippian
- Dates: c. 1200 CE — c. 1700 CE
- Type site: Medora site
- Major sites: Anna, Atchafalaya Basin, Emerald, Grand Village, Holly Bluff, Mazique, Sims, Winterville
- Preceded by: Coles Creek culture
- Followed by: Mississippian, Protohistoric Natchez and Taensa peoples,

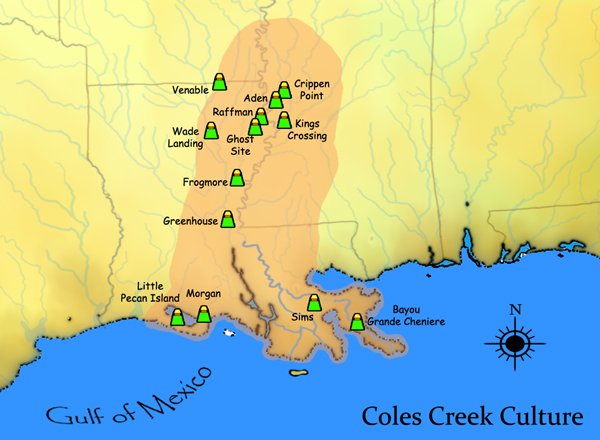
Map showing the extent of the Coles Creek culture and some important sites, many of which continued to be occupied and used by their Plaquemine descendants

The Plaquemine culture was an archaeological culture (circa 1200 to 1700 CE) centered on the Lower Mississippi River valley. It had a deep history in the area stretching back through the earlier Coles Creek (700–1200 CE) and Troyville cultures (400–700 CE) to the Marksville culture (100 BCE to 400 CE). The Natchez and related Taensa peoples were their historic period descendants. The type site for the culture is the Medora site in Louisiana; while other examples include the Anna, Emerald, Holly Bluff, and Winterville sites in Mississippi.

== History ==
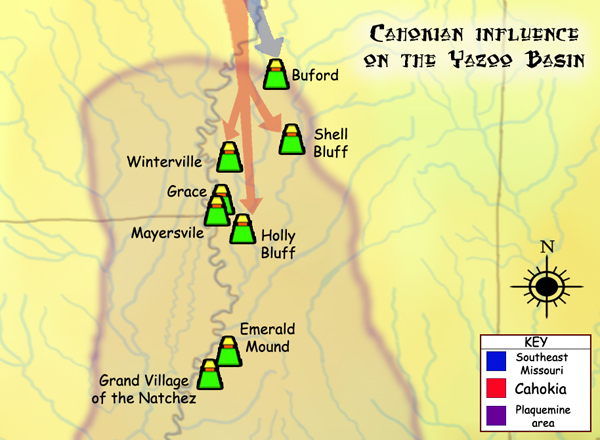
Early Mississippian influence on the Yazoo Basin area

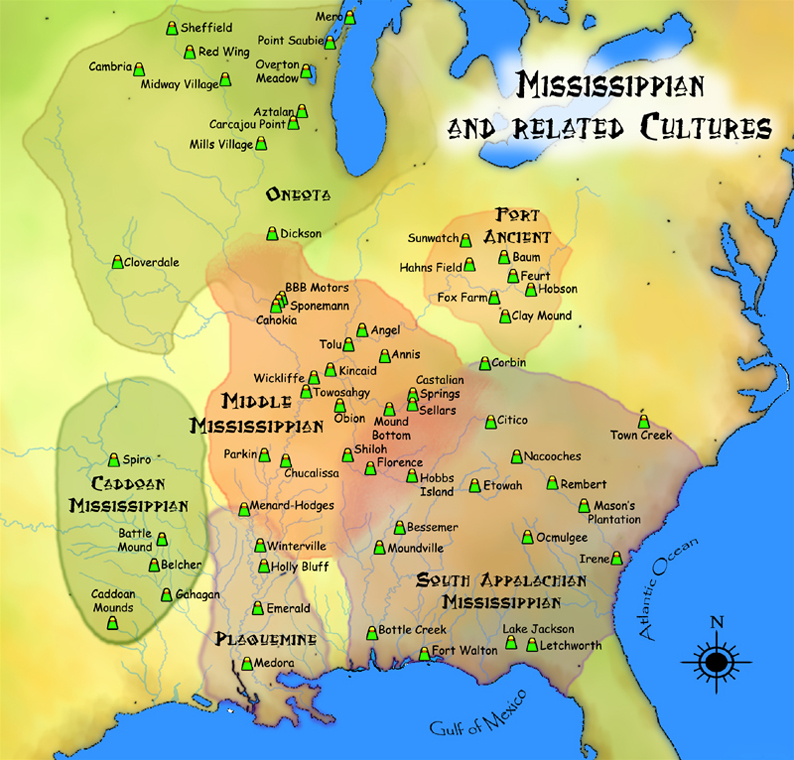
A map showing approximate areas of various Mississippian and related cultures.

=== Definition ===
The Plaquemine culture was a Mississippian culture variant centered on the Mississippi River valley, stretching from the Gulf of Mexico to just south of its junction with the Arkansas River, encompassing the Yazoo River basin and Natchez Bluffs in western Mississippi, and the lower Ouachita and Red River valleys in southeastern Arkansas, and eastern Louisiana. They were primarily agriculturists who grew maize, pumpkins, squash, beans and tobacco but they also hunted, fished, and gathered wild plants.

The Medora site in West Baton Rouge Parish, Louisiana is the type site for the period, defined by Dr. James A. Ford and George I. Quimby after excavations at the site in the late 1930s and early 1940s. The name for the culture is taken from the proximity of Medora to the nearby town of Plaquemine. It was inhabited from approximately 1300 to 1600 CE and it consisted of two platform mounds separated by a plaza. Pottery from the site was overwhelmingly grog-tempered with only a few bits of shell-tempered pottery being found. These cultural hallmarks along with the implementation of intensive maize agriculture have become Plaquemine culture designators.

Plaquemine was an outgrowth of the earlier Coles Creek culture (700 to 1200 CE). They experienced significant contact with Mississippian culture peoples to their north and east and the Terminal Coles Creek/early Plaquemine period was contemporaneous with the height of the Middle Mississippian culture at Cahokia in the American Bottom near St. Louis, Missouri. After Cahokia's collapse in the mid 14th century they coexisted with Late Mississippian groups centered on eastern Arkansas near Memphis. Archaeologists debate whether Plaquemine is a completely local development or if the changes in their society that led from Coles Creek to Plaquemine was a result of contact with their Mississippian neighbors. Many of these Coles Creek sites continued use by their Plaquemine descendants, and Plaquemine sites were still being used in the early 1700s during the early historic period.

The Plaquemine period saw the re-purposing and expansion of sites occupied during the Coles Creek period. Unlike Mississippian settlements which were often large nucleated villages, Plaquemine settlements were usually barely populated ceremonial civic centers whose only permanent residents were the elites and their families, priests, and their attendants and servants. Everyone else lived in small hamlets and farmsteads dispersed across the landscape. Coupled with the adoption of maize agriculture during this period was a population explosion and an increase in the number and size of the sites. The ethnographic record from the historic period suggests some large sites such as Winterville or Emerald were the centers of paramount chiefdoms who exerted control over other smaller civic sites. These second tier rulers, part of a hereditary nobility, would have been related matrilineally to the ruling paramount chief. An inherently volatile system, sometimes factions in smaller centers attained supremacy and power would shift from one civic center to another, resulting in the partial or total abandonment of the former capital.

=== Plaquemine Mississippian ===
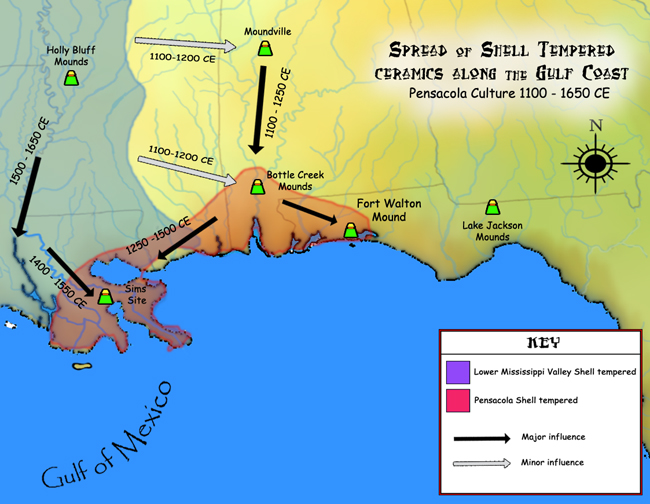
Spread of shell tempered pottery eastward into southern Plaquemine area

Beginning during the Terminal Coles Creek period (1150 to 1250 CE), Mississippian cultures far upstream from the Plaquemine area began expanding their reach southward. Excavations in the Yazoo Basin area of Mississippi have shown a Cahokia Horizon as extra-regional exotic goods, such as Cahokian pottery and other artifacts, began to be deposited in Coles Creek-Plaquemine culture sites. Through repeated contacts, groups in Mississippi and then Louisiana began adopting Mississippian techniques for making pottery, as well as ceremonial objects and possibly social structuring.

By the mid 15th century influences from Pensacola culture peoples (from the Bottle Creek site on the Gulf Coast near Mobile) had begun spreading westward across Barataria Bay and the Atchafalaya Basin and by 1700 had Mississipianized the local populations as far north as modern day Baton Rouge, Louisiana. Use of grog tempering for pottery at locations such as the Sims site in southeastern Louisiana had been replaced by shell tempering.

The Plaquemine peoples absorbed more Mississippian influence and the area of their distinct culture began to shrink after 1350 CE. Eventually the last enclave of purely Plaquemine culture was the southern Natchez Bluffs area, while the Yazoo Basin and Louisiana areas became a hybrid Plaquemine Mississippian culture.

=== Protohistory ===
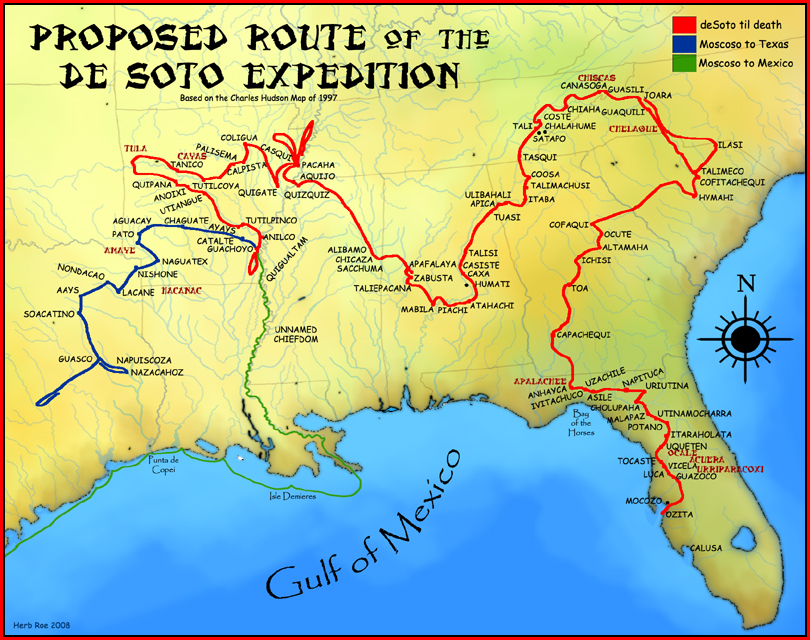
A map showing the de Soto route through the Southeast

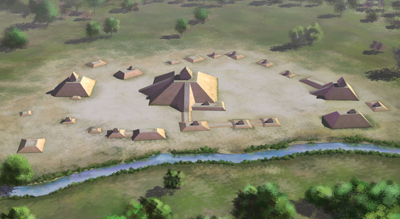
Winterville site, near Greenville, Mississippi

The earliest European account of the culture may be recorded in the journals of the Spanish expedition of Hernando de Soto. In 1542 de Soto's expedition encountered a powerful chiefdom located on the eastern bank of the Mississippi River. Native sources called it "Quigualtam", the name of the polity, its capital, and its paramount chief. By this point the expedition had been traversing the southeast for several years and accounts of their deplorable treatment of the indigenous populations would have been known by groups they had yet to contact in person. Their encounter with the polity was brief and violent; the natives attacked and chased the Spaniards with their canoes. When the remnants of de Sotos expedition finally made it down the river past Quigualtam they encountered below it another unnamed but powerful chiefdom; who also gave chase until the foreigners had left their territory.

Various scholars have debated the identities of these two groups and their exact locations. Historian Charles M. Hudson has suggested that Quigualtam was centered on the area surrounding the Holly Bluff or Winterville sites in the lower Yazoo Basin. The sites themselves are thought by archaeologists to have been abandoned by this point but the power center of the polity had probably shifted to another site within its territory. Others have put forward the Glass site; which is on the flood plain in between the Mississippi River and the Natchez Bluffs approximately 9.5 kilometres (5.9 mi) south of Vicksburg. A possibility for the second group is the Emerald Phase (1500 – 1680) of the Natchez chiefdom, headquartered at the massive Emerald Mound; which was in its ascendancy at the time. These two sites were the only major ceremonial center on this stretch of the Mississippi River occupied during the protohistoric period from 1500 to 1650 CE. Since the Spaniards never made it ashore to leave archaeological evidence of contact with these two groups their exact identity will probably never be determined with certainty. No further recorded European contact with the indigenous people in this area occurred for almost 140 years when the first French explorers arrived in the area. By the historic period, power had shifted within the Natchez polity from Emerald Mound to the Grand Village of the Natchez.

In the meantime native peoples of the region suffered from epidemics of infectious disease; carried both by the de Soto expedition and indirectly from other Native Americans who had contact with European traders on the Gulf coast. On top of this the intrusion of Europeans had upset the delicate political balance between native groups who had existed in a state of endemic warfare between polities for generations. Many societies in the region began to collapse. Remnant populations of Mississippian peoples began migrating across and down the Mississippi. The post de Soto entrada Transylvania Phase (1550-1700 CE) of the Tensas Basin saw the increasing spread of Mississippian influences diffusing southward from Arkansas and northwestern Mississippi into traditional Plaquemine territory. The Jordan Mounds site on a relict channel of the Arkansas River in northeastern Louisianas Morehouse Parish was constructed during the protohistoric period between 1540 and 1685. The builders were an intrusive group in the area; Mississippianized peoples who were possibly refugees from the Mississippi River area to the east that were escaping the collapse of their societies brought about by the aftereffects of first European contact. Others, such as the multiple Mississippian Tunica speaking polities encountered by de Soto in Arkansas and northwestern Mississippi had all but vanished; with a few small groups like the Tunica and Koroa relocating to former Plaquemine territory at the mouth of the Yazoo River in west central Mississippi. The Central Mississippi Valley which de Soto had described as the most heavily populated area he had seen since the Valley of Mexico was now almost vacant; only sparsely occupied by the Quapaw who were an intrusive Dhegiha Siouan people that moved into the area from the Ohio River region sometime in the late 16th to early 17th century.

=== Historic era ===
Now surrounded on all sides by Mississippians, several Plaquemine groups persisted into the historic era in the Natchez Bluffs area. Cultural trappings including societal organization, language and pottery styles in Louisiana and Mississippi during the early historic period bear this out. Possibly because their encounter with de Soto had been so brief compared to the more northerly populations, the Plaquemine Natchez people and Taensa peoples alone maintained the characteristics of complex chiefdoms such as hereditary elites, mound ceremonialism, and retainer sacrifice long into the period after the European colonization of America began. They were the last Plaquemine culture peoples. Groups who were intrusive to the area or local groups who had been Mississippianized are identified at the time of sustained European contact as those tribes speaking the Tunican, Chitimachan, and Muskogean languages.

== Culture ==
=== Architecture ===
They had complex political and religious institutions and lived in villages centered on large ceremonial centers with two or more platform mounds facing an open plaza. The site of a mound was usually one with special significance, either a pre-existing mortuary site, temple, or civic structure. The flat-topped, pyramidal mounds usually underwent multiple episodes of mound construction and were built in several stages. Sometimes they were topped by one or more smaller mounds secondary mounds. After each expansion episode new structures were usually constructed on their summits. In earlier times, buildings were usually circular, but later they were likely to be rectangular. They were constructed of wattle and daub, and sometimes with wall posts sunk into wall trenches. At times, shallow, oval or rectangular graves were dug in the mounds. These might have been for primary burials, but more often they were for the reburial of remains originally interred in mortuary houses.

This pattern of plazas flanked by mounds with temples, elite residences and mortuary structures at their summits was inherited from their Troyville and Coles Creek culture ancestors, and was a village arrangement widely employed throughout the southeast. Like other Native Americans in the southeast this open plaza area would have been used for public rituals and functions such as the Green Corn Ceremony and games such as chunkey and the ballgame.

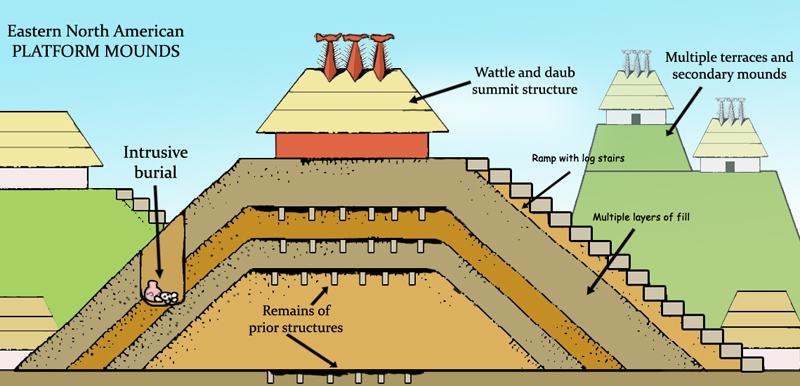
A diagram showing the various components of platform mounds

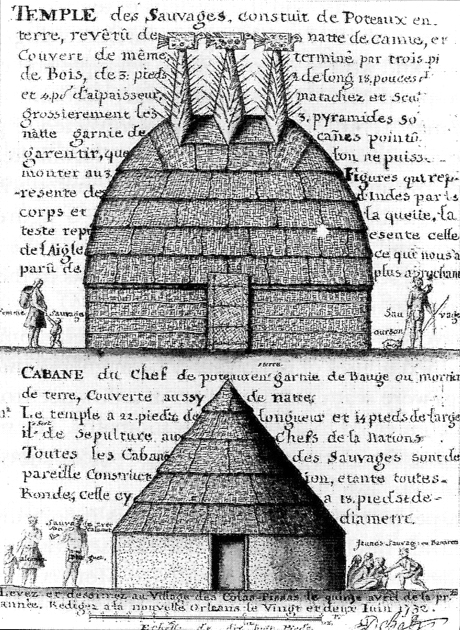
Great Temple and Great Suns cabin drawn by eyewitness Alexandre de Batz

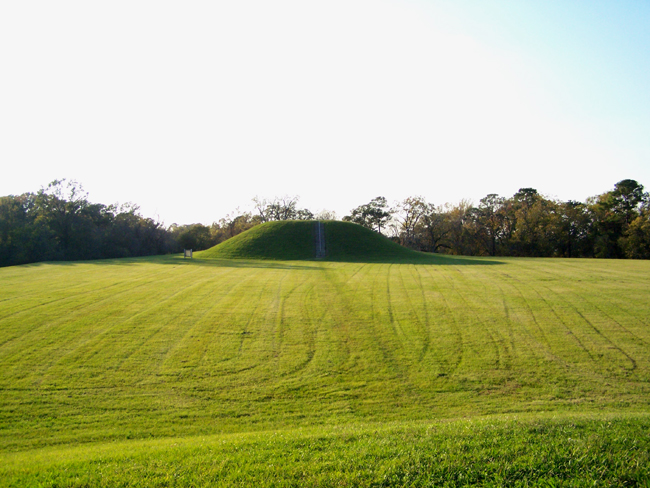
Secondary mound on top of the massive Emerald Mound

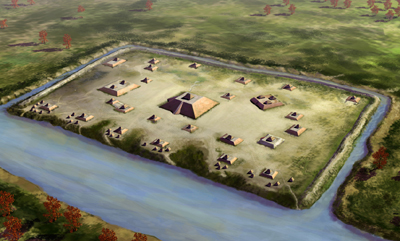
Arrangement of mounds and plaza at the Holly Bluff site

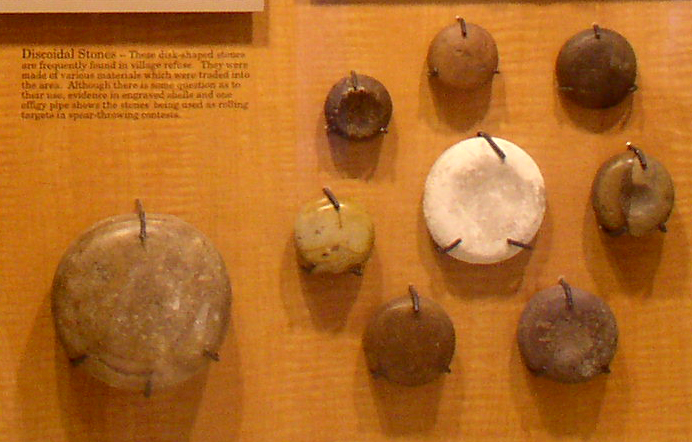
Stone discoidals used for the game of chunkey, found at Winterville

=== Ceramics ===
Plaquemine pottery was decorated with their own unique characteristics. They sometimes added small solid handles called lugs and textured the surface by brushing clumps of grass over the vessel before it was fired. Potters cut designs into the surface of the wet clay and, like their Caddoan contemporaries, the Plaquemine peoples engraved designs on pots after they were fired. Plaquemine peoples also had undecorated pots that they used for ordinary daily tasks. Pottery was included in burials as grave goods, often being ritually "killed". This type has a hole in the base of the vessel that was cut while the pot was being made, usually before it was fired.

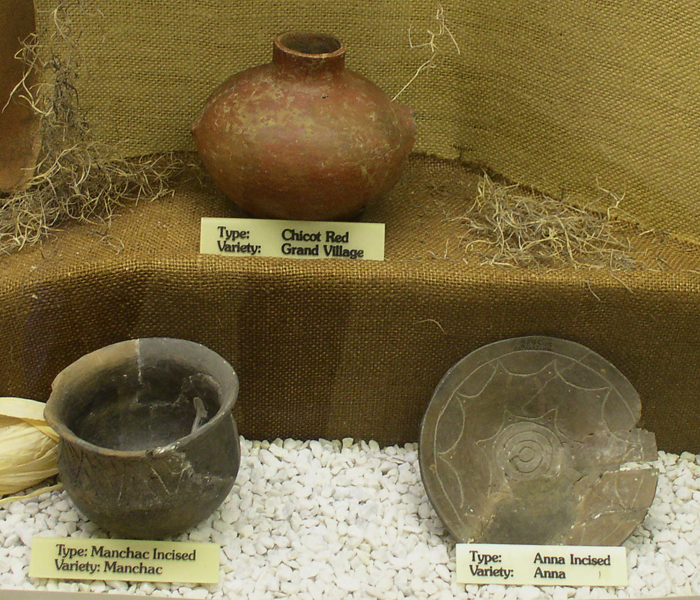
Natchez pottery from the Grand Village site

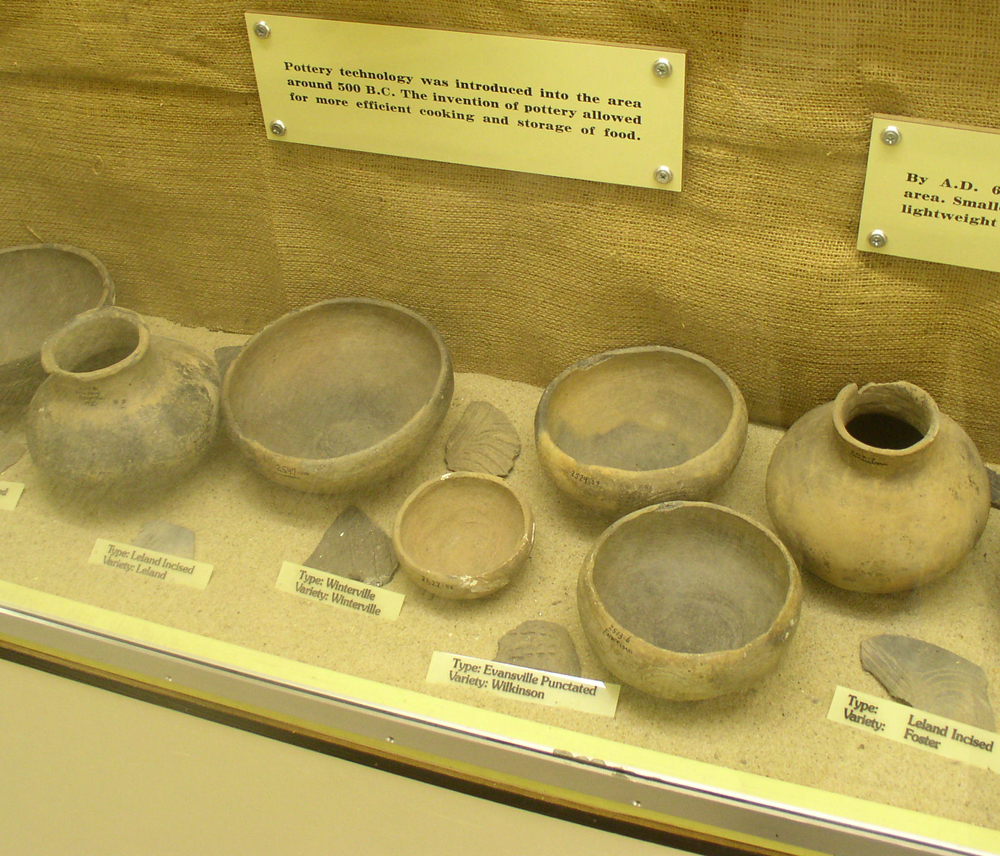
Natchez pottery from the Grand Village site

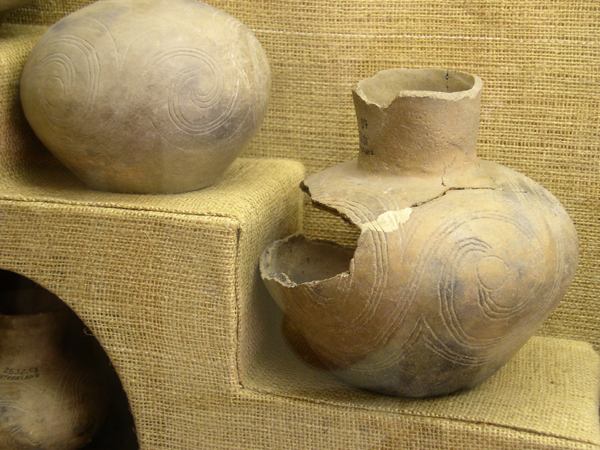
Natchez pottery from the Grand Village site

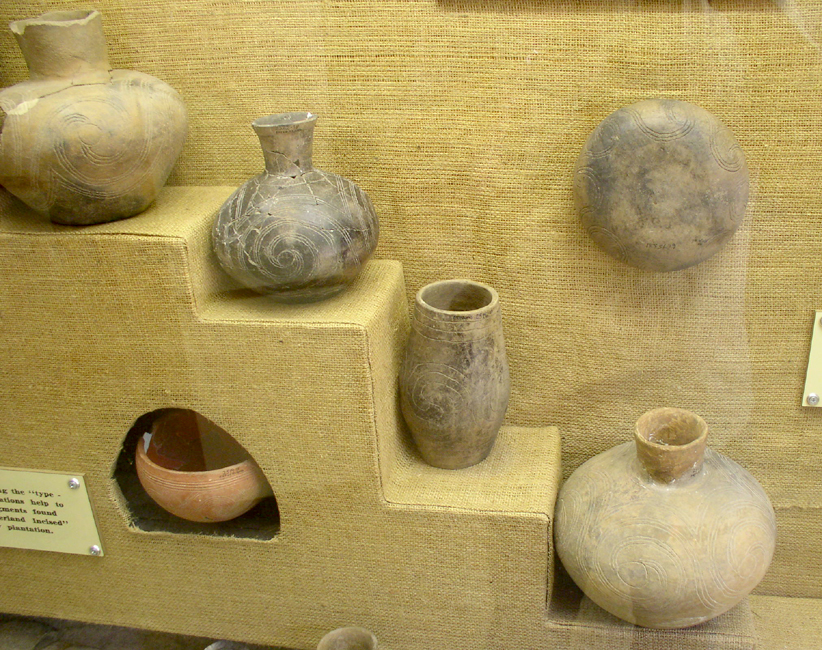
Natchez pottery from the Grand Village site

Pottery during this phase still used grog tempering as their Coles Creek ancestors had; with the use of ground mussel shell tempering being a distinctive marker for Mississippian cultural contact. Pottery from protohistoric Natchez sites in western Mississippi still used the traditional Plaquemine grog tempering and traditional vessel forms. The pottery of the Taensa in eastern Louisiana used Mississippian style shell tempering and pottery shapes but was still being engraved with decorative designs typical of the Plaquemine area. This difference between the two closely related groups showed that Mississippian diffusion into the area beginning during the Transylvania Phase (1550-1700 CE) of the Tensas Basin region from what is now southeastern Arkansas had by the late 17th century reached the lower Tensas River basin in Louisiana.

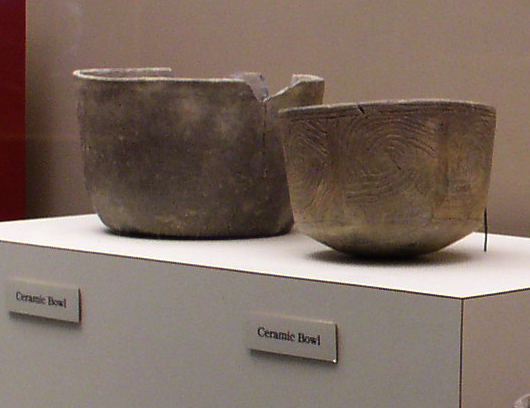
Pottery from the Winterville site

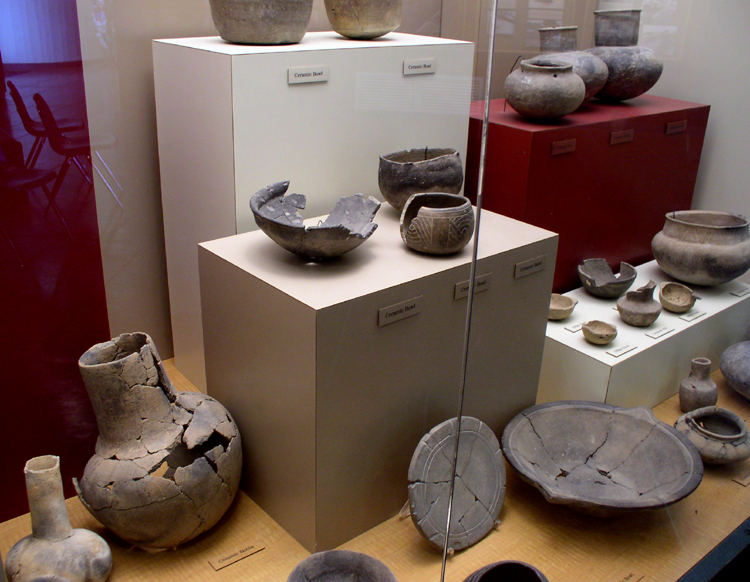
Pottery from the Winterville site

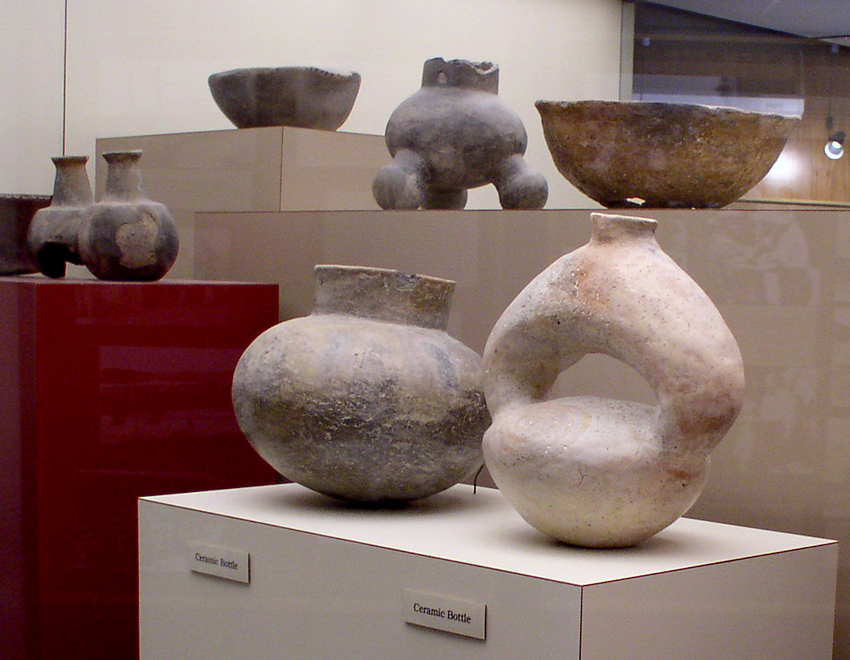
Pottery from the Winterville site

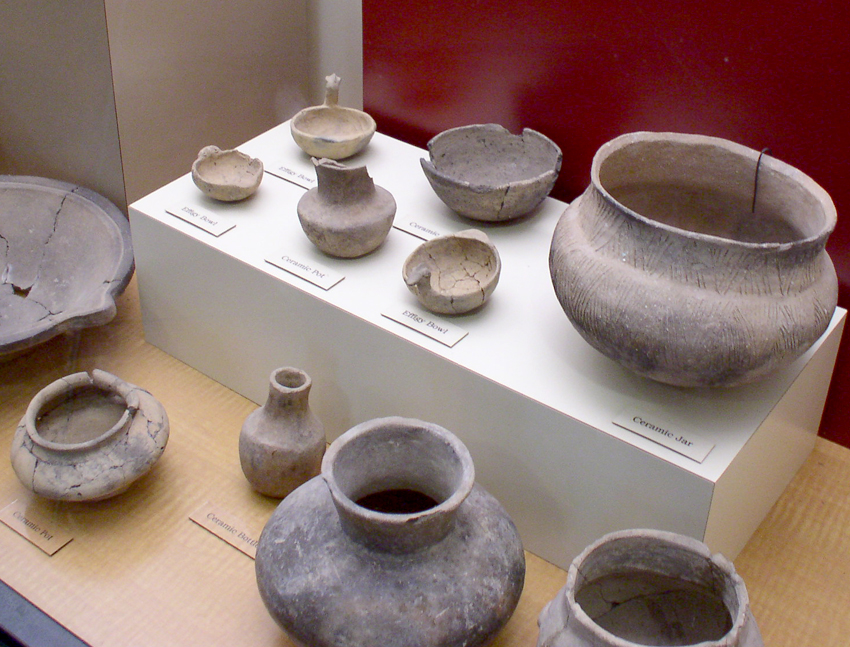
Pottery from the Winterville site

=== Chronology ===
Culture	Lower Yazoo Basin Phases	Dates	Natchez Bluff Phases	Dates	Tensas Basin Phases	Felsenthal Phases	Dates
Plaquemine	Russell (Tunica)	1650–1750 CE	Natchez	1680–1730 CE	Tensas		
Plaquemine	Wasp Lake	1500 to 1650 CE	Emerald	1500 to 1680 CE	Transylvania	Caney Bayou ?	1550 - 1700 ?
Plaquemine	Lake George	1350 to 1500 CE	Foster	1350-1500 CE	Fitzhugh	Gran Marais ?	1250-1350 CE ?
Plaquemine	Winterville	1200 to 1400 CE	Anna	1200 to 1350 CE	Routh	Bartholomew ?	1200-1400 CE ?

Culture	Lower Ouachita Phases	Dates	Catahoula Phases	Dates	Atchafalaya Phases	Lake Salvador Phases	Dates
Plaquemine	Jordan	1540-1685 CE					

== Sites ==
Site	Image	Description
Anna site	Anna site	Located in Adams County, Mississippi 10 miles (16 km) north of Natchez. The type site for the Anna Phase (1200 to 1350) of the Natchez Bluff region.
Atchafalaya Basin Mounds		AKA as Patterson Mounds, Patterson site, Moro Plantation Mounds and the protohistoric village of Qiteet Kuti´ngi Na´mu of the Chitimacha Tribe of Louisiana, originally occupied by the Coastal Coles Creek and later Plaquemine around 980 CE, and by protohistoric period descendants, the Chitimacha, during the 18th century. Located on the northern bank of the Teche at its confluence with the Atchafalaya in St. Mary Parish, Louisiana. It consists of several platform mounds and a shell midden situated around a central plaza.
Emerald Mound site	Emerald Mound	Located approximately 8 miles (13 km) north of Natchez. The second largest pre-Columbian structure in the USA and is the type site for the Emerald Phase (1350 to 1500 CE) of the Natchez Bluffs region.
Fitzhugh Mounds	Fitzhugh Mounds	A Plaquemine/Mississippian site in Madison Parish, Louisiana which dates from approximately 1200–1541. It is the type site for the protohistoric Fitzhugh Phase (1300-1400 CE) of the Tensas Basin chronology.
Flowery Mound		A single mound Late Coles Creek to Plaquemine/Mississippian site in Tensas Parish, Louisiana which dates from approximately 1200–1541.
Foster's Mound		A two mound site in Adams County, Mississippi which dates from approximately 1350 to 1500 CE and is the type site for the Foster Phase.
Ghost Site Mounds		A site in Tensas Parish, Louisiana with an Early to Middle Coles Creek component (700–1200) and a Late Coles Creek to Plaquemine component (1200 to 1541).
Glass site		A large multimound site in Warren County, Mississippi southwest of Vicksburg, on the flood plain in between the Mississippi River and the loess bluffs. It consisted of four mounds surrounding an open plaza, although only 3 are still in existence.
Grand Village of the Natchez or Fatherland Site	Grand Village of the Natchez	A historic period Late Plaquemine/protohistoric period site located in the present town of Natchez, Mississippi, one of the very few mound culture sites still in use during the historic period.
Holly Bluff site	Holly Bluff site	A Plaquemine/Mississippian site from central western Mississippi, sometimes known as the Lake George Site. It is the type site for the Lake George Phase (1400 to 1500 CE) of the Yazoo Basin region.
Jaketown Site	Jaketown site	A site with two mounds in Humphreys County, Mississippi. While the mounds have not been excavated, pottery sherds found in the area lead scholars to date the sites construction and use to roughly 1100 CE to 1500 CE. Artifacts found in the area demonstrate the site was occupied from 1750 BCE to 1500 CE, making it one of the oldest continuously inhabited sites in the region. There were smaller mounds nearby that were hundreds of years older than the surviving two, built by peoples of a preceding culture, but they were destroyed by plowing and road construction in the early 20th century.
Julice Mound		A mound site in East Carroll Parish, Louisiana dated to 1200–1541 CE and located less than one mile from Transylvania Mounds.
Mangum Mound Site	Mangum Mound	A Plaquemine site in Claiborne County, Mississippi, located at milepost 45.7 on the Natchez Trace Parkway. Several avian themed repoussé Mississippian copper plates were discovered there in 1936.
Mazique Archeological Site	Mazique	A multimound site in Adams County, Mississippi southeast of Natchez, Mississippi, with components from both the Coles Creek period (700-1000 CE) and the later Plaquemine period (1000-1680 CE), when it was recorded in historic times as the White Apple village of the Natchez people.
Medora site	Medora site	A Plaquemine site in West Baton Rouge Parish, Louisiana, the type site for which the Plaquemine culture was defined.
Pocahontas Mounds	Pocahontas Mounds	A multimound site with a platform mound, a mortuary mound, and an associated village area, located in Hinds County, Mississippi and dating to 1000 to 1300 CE.
Routh Mounds		A multimound site located in Tensas Parish, Louisiana that is type site for the Routh Phase(1200 to 1350 CE) of the Tensas Basin chronology.
Scott Place Mounds		A multimound site from the Late Coles Creek-Early Plaquemine period located in Union Parish, Louisiana
Sims site		A multimound site located in Saint Charles Parish, Louisiana near the town of Paradis, first inhabited about 800 CE by Coles Creek peoples. By 1100 CE the culture of the site had transitioned into the Plaquemine culture that lasted until 1450 CE. A little later was a Late Mississippian/protohistic period that lasted from 1500 until about 1700 or 1800.
Transylvania Mounds		A large multimound site with 2 plazas and components from the Coles Creek (700–1200) and Plaquemine/Mississippian periods (1200–1541). It located in East Carroll Parish, Louisiana It is the type site for the protohistoric Transylvania Phase (1400-1650 CE) of the Tensas Basin chronology.
Venable Mound		A single mound site with components from the Troyville, Coles Creek and Plaquemine periods, located in Morehouse Parish, Louisiana
Winterville site	Winterville site	A Plaquemine/Mississippian site near Greenville, Mississippi. It is the type site for the Winterville Phase (1200 to 1400 CE) of the Yazoo Basin region.

== See also ==
- Mississippian culture
- Culture, phase, and chronological table for the Mississippi Valley
