= Flowery Mound =

Archaeological site in Louisiana, US

- Location within Louisiana today
- 31°56′26.9″N 91°16′16.6″W
- Cultures: Plaquemine culture, Mississippian culture
- Location: Saint Joseph, Louisiana, Tensas Parish, Louisiana, United States
- Region: Tensas Parish, Louisiana

History
- Built: 950 CE
- Abandoned: 1541 CE

Flowery Mound is an archaeological site in Tensas Parish, Louisiana with components from the Late Coles Creek and Plaquemine-Mississippian culture which dates from approximately 950–1541.

== Description ==
The site is located on Andrews Bayou. The mound itself is a very well preserved platform mound measuring 10 feet (3.0 m) in height and 165 feet (50 m) by 130 feet (40 m) at its base and a summit measuring 50 feet (15 m) square. Core samples taken during investigations at the site have revealed the mound was built in a single stage and because the fill types can still be differentiated it suggests the mound is relatively young. Radiocarbon dating of charcoal found in a midden under the mound reveals that the site was occupied from 996–1162 during the Coles Creek period. The mound was built over the midden between 1200–1541 during the Plaquemine/Mississippian period. This was further confirmed by stylistic analysis of pottery found at the site.

== See also ==
- Culture, phase, and chronological table for the Mississippi Valley
- Balmoral Mounds
- Ghost Site Mounds
- Routh Mounds
- Sundown Mounds
