= Transylvania Mounds =

Archaeological site in East Carroll Parish, Louisiana, US

- Location within Louisiana today
- 32°41′3.95″N 91°12′12.20″W
- Periods: Transylvania Phase (1500-1680 CE)
- Cultures: Coles Creek culture, Plaquemine culture, Mississippian culture
- Location: Transylvania, Louisiana, East Carroll Parish, Louisiana, USA
- Region: East Carroll Parish, Louisiana

History
- Built: 700 CE
- Abandoned: 1541

Transylvania Mounds is an archaeological site in East Carroll Parish, Louisiana with components from the Coles Creek (700–1200)CE and Plaquemine/Mississippi periods (1200–1541). It is the type site for the Transylvania Phase (1500-1680 CE) of the Tensas Basin Plaquemine Mississippian chronology.

== Description ==
A large multimound site with two plazas and possibly as many as twelve mounds. The largest mound at the site was 34 feet (10 m) in height and was flanked on two sides by the plazas. Several of the mounds are no longer visible because intensive European farming methods have leveled them. The ones that do remain are 18 feet (5.5 m), 9 feet (2.7 m), 6.5 feet (2.0 m), 3.5 feet (1.1 m), and 1.5 feet (0.46 m) in height. The site underwent limited archaeological testing in the 1960s. These tests dated occupation of the site about 700–1200 CE during the Coles Creek period. Other ceramics discovered at the site were dated to 1200–1541 during the Plaquemine Mississippian period. A series of radiocarbon samples returned dates between 1048 and 1411 CE. These investigations prompted archaeologists to use the Transylvania site as the type site for the Transylvania Phase (1500-1680 CE) of the local Tensas Basin Plaquemine Mississippian chronology. When the site was mapped in 2000 investigators were able to identify six remaining mounds.

== See also ==
- Julice Mound
- Culture, phase, and chronological table for the Mississippi Valley
