= Balmoral Mounds =

Archaeological site in Louisiana, US

Balmoral Mounds 16 TE 12
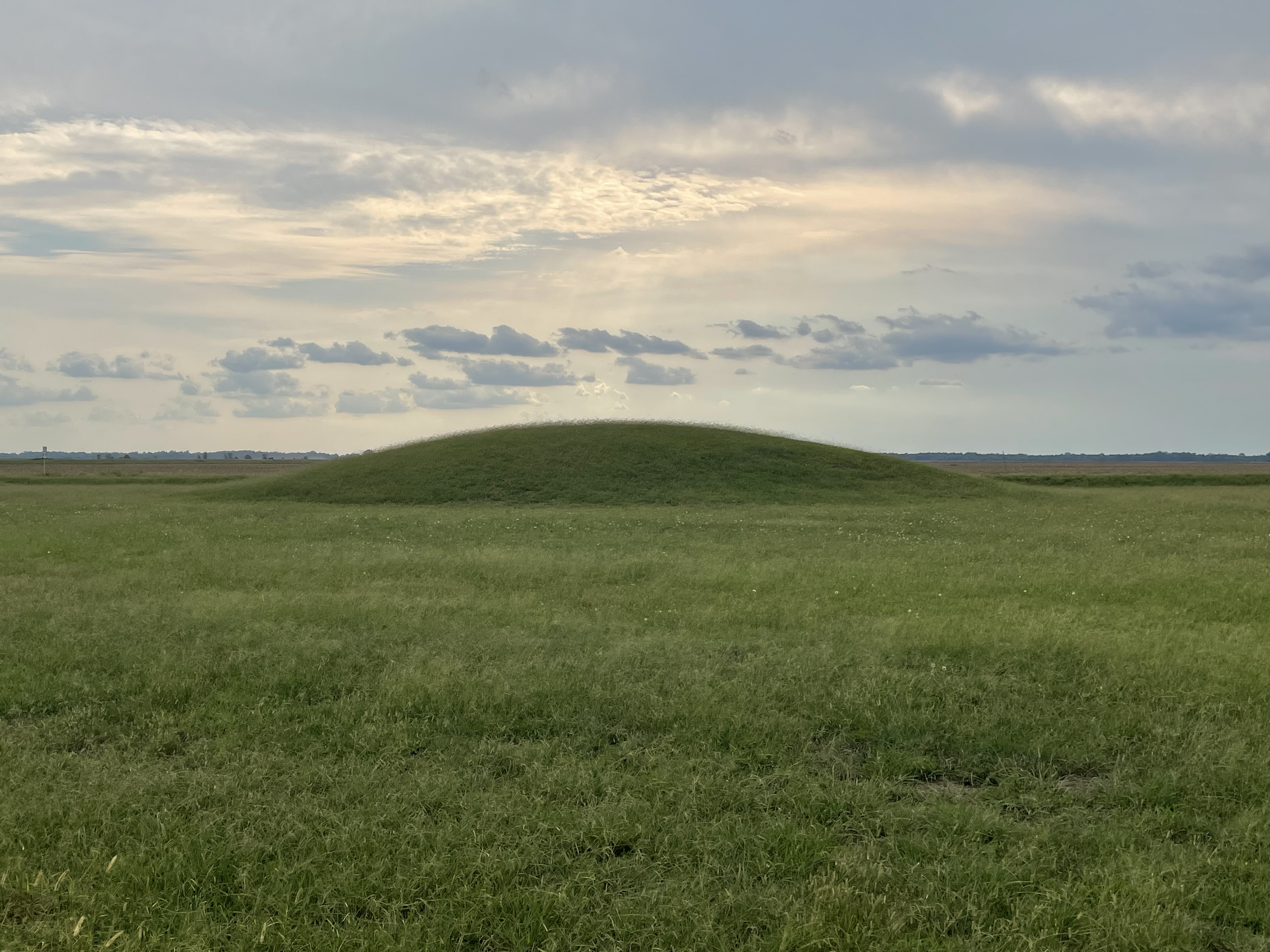

- Location within Louisiana today
- 32°7′55″N 91°14′26.3″W
- Cultures: Coles Creek culture
- Location: Somerset, Tensas Parish, Louisiana, US
- Region: Tensas Parish, Louisiana

History
- Built: 700 CE
- Abandoned: 1200

Balmoral Mounds (16 TE 12) is an archaeological site of the Coles Creek culture in Tensas Parish, Louisiana. The site has components located both on the east and west sides of US 65 near Bayou Rousset.

== Description ==
The site consists of 3 platform mounds that form an equilateral triangle. Mound A, the southwesternmost of the group, measures 11 feet (3.4 m) in height, with the base being 150 feet (46 m) by 165 feet (50 m). Mound B, the northernmost mound, is a dome shaped mound measuring 9 feet (2.7 m) in height, with the base being 100 feet (30 m) by 130 feet (40 m). The northernmost mound in the triangle, Mound C, is also a dome shaped mound and measures 8 feet (2.4 m) in height, with the base being 130 feet (40 m) by 150 feet (46 m). Core samples of Mounds A and C suggest they were built at roughly the same time and in single stages

== Location ==
The site is located on US 65 3 miles (4.8 km) south of Somerset.

== See also ==
- Balmoral, Louisiana
- Culture, phase, and chronological table for the Mississippi Valley
- Flowery Mound
- Ghost Site Mounds
- Routh Mounds
- Sundown Mounds
