= Routh Mounds =

Archaeological site in Tensas Parish, Louisiana, U.S.

- Location within Louisiana today
- 32°1′15.85″N 91°12′46.19″W
- Periods: Routh Phase
- Cultures: Plaquemine culture
- Location: Newellton, Louisiana, Tensas Parish, Louisiana, USA
- Region: Tensas Parish, Louisiana

Routh Mounds is a Plaquemine culture archaeological site in Tensas Parish, Louisiana. It is the type site for the Routh Phase(1200 to 1350 CE) of the Tensas Basin Plaquemine Mississippian chronology. It is located approximately 2 miles (3.2 km) northwest of the Winter Quarters State Historic Site.

== See also ==
- Culture, phase, and chronological table for the Mississippi Valley
- Balmoral Mounds
- Flowery Mound
- Ghost Site Mounds
- Sundown Mounds
- Routh family
