= Foster's Mound =

Archaeological site in Mississippi

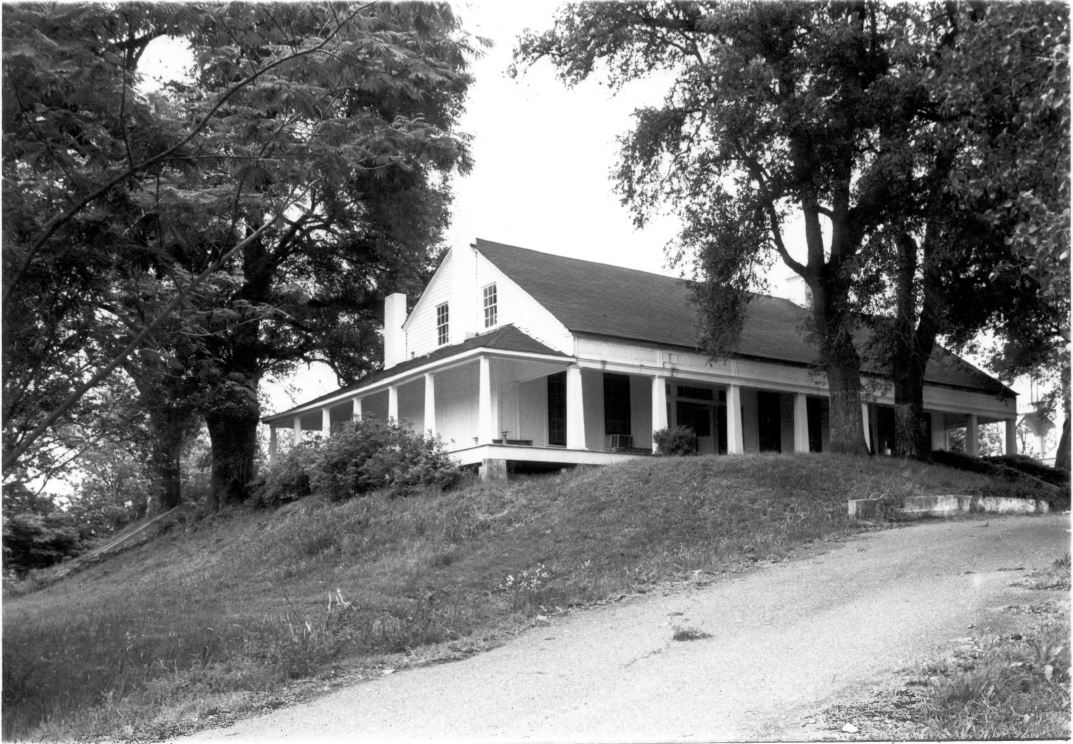
- Mound A with antebellum home located atop

- Location in Mississippi today
- 31°35′54.31″N 91°19′49.98″W
- Periods: Foster Phase
- Cultures: Plaquemine culture
- Location: Natchez, Mississippi, Adams County, Mississippi, United States
- Region: Adams County, Mississippi

Site notes
- Excavation dates: 1971-72
- Archaeologists: Jeffrey P. Brain
- Foster's Mound
- U.S. National Register of Historic Places
- Nearest city: Natchez, Mississippi
- Area: 25 acres (10 ha)
- Built: 1840
- Architectural style: Greek Revival
- NRHP reference No.: 82003091
- Added to NRHP: September 2, 1982

Foster's Mound (22 AD 503) is a Plaquemine culture archaeological site located in Adams County, Mississippi northeast of Natchez off US 61. It is the type site for the Foster Phase (1350-1500 CE) of the Natchez Bluffs Plaquemine culture chronology. It was added to the NRHP on September 2, 1982 as NRIS number 82003091. The mounds are listed on the Mississippi Mound Trail.

== Description ==
The Foster's site has two platform mounds and is located on the northern bank of St. Catherine Creek near its confluence with the Mississippi River. The largest mound, Mound A, is 3 metres (9.8 ft) in height and 30 metres (98 ft) by 30 metres (98 ft) at its base and has had a plantation house on its summit since the 1790s. Its dimensions were originally smaller but it was enlarged to accommodate the veranda of the plantation house. Mound B is 220 metres (720 ft) to the south across a large plaza area. It is an amorphous blob about 1.5 metres (4.9 ft) at its highest point. It has been seriously eroded by the creek and is barely recognizable as a rectangular platform mound. The site sat at a major crossroads in Precolumbian times, because of its location on the original route of the Natchez Trace, directly connected to Emerald Mound to the northeast and the Grand Village of the Natchez to the southwest, and its proximity to the Mississippi River. The site was excavated in 1971-72 by Jeffrey P. Brain as part of the Lower Mississippi Survey for the Peabody Museum of Archaeology and Ethnology of Harvard University. Pottery recovered from beneath the mounds was found to be proto-Natchezan and was instrumental in defining the protohistoric Foster Phase (1350 to 1500 CE) of the Plaquemine culture chronology.
