= Medora site =

Archaeological site in West Baton Rouge Parish, Louisiana, United States

Medora site; 16 WBR 1
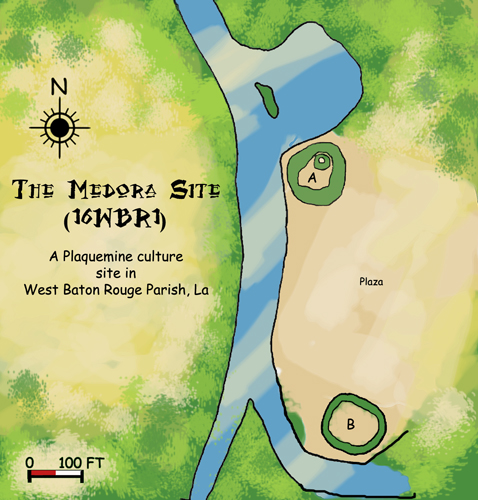
- Diagram of the Medora site

- Location within Louisiana today
- 30°19′36.34″N 91°12′5.65″W
- Cultures: Plaquemine culture
- Location: Plaquemine, Louisiana, West Baton Rouge Parish, Louisiana, United States
- Region: West Baton Rouge Parish, Louisiana

History
- Built: 1300 CE

Site notes
- Architectural styles: Platform mounds, Plaza
- Excavation dates: 1939-1940
- Archaeologists: James A. Ford, George I. Quimby

The Medora site (16WBR1) is an archaeological site that is a type site for the prehistoric Plaquemine culture period. The name for the culture is taken from the proximity of Medora to the town of Plaquemine, Louisiana. The site is in West Baton Rouge Parish, Louisiana, and was inhabited from approximately 1300 to 1600 CE. It consisted of two mounds separated by a plaza. In the winter of 1939–1940 excavation of this site was undertaken by the Louisiana State Archaeological Survey, a joint project of Louisiana State University and the Work Projects Administration. It was directed by James A. Ford, and George I. Quimby. The excavations of the site were instrumental in defining the characteristics of the Plaquemine period and culture.

== The Medora site ==
=== Location ===
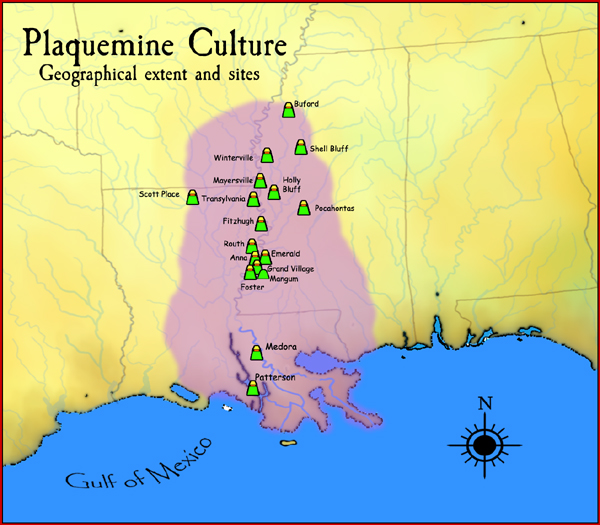
A map showing the geographical extent of the Plaquemine culture, including the Medora site.

The Medora site is located in West Baton Rouge Parish, Louisiana, adjacent to Bayou Bourbeaux (or Bourbeau or Bourbaux) on the flood plain of Manchac Point (also called Australia Point). Manchac Point is a hair-pin bend of the Mississippi River. Bayou Bourbeaux, a point stream which flows away from the river to the west, drains the back slopes of the natural levees that border Manchac Point, and connects with Bayou Gross Tete. The land surrounding the site is wet and subject to annual flooding, being only twenty feet above sea level. The site is part of the Medora Plantation, after which it is named, and had been cultivated for many years prior to the excavation.

=== Date ===
It was possible to date the site by geological and archaeological means and obtain an estimate of the period of time in which the site was occupied. According to the Louisiana Geological Survey abandoned river course maps of Harold Norman Fisk, a meander of the Mississippi River began migrating from north to south across the area now occupied by Manchac Point at stage 9 (900 CE). The land of which Manchac Point is composed was not built up behind the meander until the beginning of stage 13 (1300 CE), meaning it was not suitable for habitation until then. And since all artifacts found at the site were from the Plaquemine period and not the succeeding Natchez period which begins in 1700, the dates for occupation are approximately from 1300 to 1600 CE.

=== Mounds ===
The main part of the Medoras site is a pyramid and plaza arrangement. Mound A is a platform mound about 125 feet (38 m) to 130 feet (40 m) at the base and 10 feet (3.0 m) high. The sides sloped inward toward the top, which is flat, except for a conical projection 25 feet (7.6 m) in diameter in the northeast corner of the summit that raises the gross elevation to 13 feet (4.0 m). It was probably surmounted by a square or rectangular temple. About 400 feet (120 m) to the southeast of Mound A was a low mound about 100 feet (30 m) in diameter and 5 feet (1.5 m) high, designated Mound B. Although it has been modified by plowing and flood waters, and is now only about 2 feet (0.61 m) high. It was flat-topped, with an irregular oval outline. Its pre-mound surface was found to have a wall-trench structure, probably a house or temple. The floor contained patches of burned clay and fragments of charcoal. At the center there was a rounded fire basin 2 feet (0.61 m) in diameter and six inches deep, lined with burned clay. The mounds were composed of gray clay and brown silt, applied basket load at a time. Between Mounds A and B was a plaza about 400 feet (120 m) long and 200 feet (61 m) wide. Its west side bordered Bayou Bourbeaux.

== Artifacts ==
=== Pottery ===
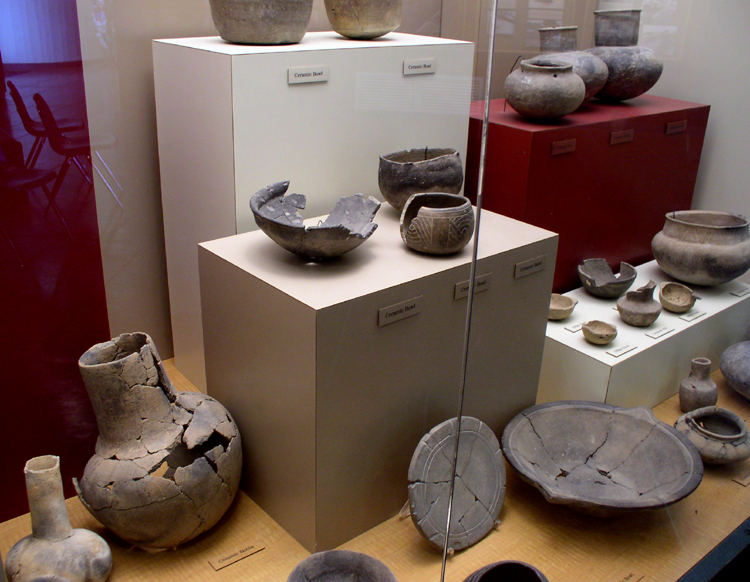
Plaquemine culture pottery from the Winterville site, a Plaquemine site in Mississippi

About 18,508 pottery sherds were obtained from the Medora site, classified into more than twenty different Plaquemine culture pottery types. About 90 percent were classified as the Addis Plain variety, although Plaquemine Brushed; Manchac Incised; Hardy Incised; Medora Incised; Harrison Bayou Incised; Evangeline Interior Incised; Australia Interior Incised; L'Eau Noire Incised; Dupree Incised; Lulu Linear Punctated; Chevalier Stamped, Coles Creek Incised, Larto Red Filmed, and Pontchartrain Check Stamped were also present.

The pottery of the Medora site was uniform in paste characteristics, soft, clay-tempered, and poorly fired, with the exception of a few shell-tempered sherds. The color generally ranges in grays and tans, with a smooth surface finish that feels soft and chalky to the touch. Although the vast majority of the pottery was plain, about 10 percent had decorative elements applied. The designs were usually simple arrangements of lines, made by incising, engraving, brushing, and punctation, with incising and brushing the most common technique. A few of the type L'Eau Noire Incised have complicated curvilinear elements. The designs are usually placed on the exterior vessel wall, mostly confined to the rim. The most common vessel forms were jars and bowls, with some cups and carinated bowls.

=== Stone ===
Although more than 18,000 pottery sherds were found, only seven artifacts of stone were found at the Medora site. Reddish pebbles of flinty stone were found in Mound A, even though they do not naturally occur in the vicinity of the Medora site. They must have been brought there, possibly from the Natchez, Mississippi, vicinity. Only three projectile points of chipped flint were found at the site, although several objects of polished greenstone and sandstone were found. Two ovate-oblong greenstone celts and a sandstone discoidal were found in the fill of Mound A. A spoon-shaped object of ground and polished greenstone was found in the fill Mound B. A discoidal was probably used in the well-known game of chunkey, which was played by almost all of the historic Indians of the Southeast. It is very likely that chunkey was played ceremonially in the plaza of the Medora site. A cylindrical earspool of fired clay with flat faces and straight sides was found in Mound A. It was 3 centimetres (1.2 in) in diameter and 1.8 centimetres (0.71 in) thick, with engraved geometric designs composed of a circle and curvilinear elements.

== Excavations ==
The land is part of the Medora Plantation, after which the site is named, and had been cultivated for many years prior to the excavation. In the winter of 1939–1940 excavation of this site was undertaken by the Louisiana State Archaeological Survey, a joint project of Louisiana State University and the Work Projects Administration. It was directed by James A. Ford, and George I. Quimby. The excavations of the site were instrumental in defining the characteristics of the Plaquemine period and culture. Permission to investigate this site was given by the owner of the land, W. L. Grace Jr., of Plaquemine, Louisiana.

== See also ==
- Coles Creek culture
- Plaquemine culture
- Mississippian culture
