= Stanton, Mississippi =

- Unincorporated community
- Location within Mississippi Location within the United States
- Coordinates: 31°36′58″N 91°14′25″W
- Country: United States
- State: Mississippi
- County: Adams
- Elevation: 308 ft (94 m)
- Time zone: UTC-6 (Central (CST))
  - Summer (DST): UTC-5 (CDT)
- GNIS feature ID: 694882

Stanton is an unincorporated community in Adams County, Mississippi. It is the nearest community to Emerald Mound site, a National Historic Landmark.

== History ==
Stanton is located on a branch of the former Yazoo and Mississippi Valley Railroad. A post office operated under the name Stanton from 1884 to 1955.
