= James A. Ford =

American archaeologist (1911–68)

James Alfred Ford (February 12, 1911 – February 25, 1968) was an American archaeologist. He was born in Water Valley, Mississippi, in February 1911. While growing up in the region, where ancient earthwork mounds are visible, he became interested in work on the ancient Native American cultures who built these works.

== Archaeological career ==
In 1933 Ford developed a tentative chronology of the Native American cultures on the lower Mississippi River. Between 1933 and 1934, he worked at the Ocmulgee National Monument in Macon, Georgia, under Arthur Randolph Kelly. Also in 1934, he investigated the Tabby Ruins at Elizafield Plantation near Brunswick, Georgia. From August 1 to September 1, 1934, he worked for the Georgia State Parks Service; and later that year, from September 2 to October 15, he worked for the Southeast Fair Association to develop an American Indian Exhibition in Atlanta, Georgia. In 1937, he became involved in a restoration project of an earthen lodge at Ocmulgee National Monument for the National Park Service.

In the winter of 1939–40, during the Great Depression, he excavated the Medora site for the Louisiana State Archaeological Survey, a joint project of Louisiana State University and the Work Projects Administration. These excavations were instrumental in defining the characteristics of the Plaquemine culture and period.

In the early 1950s Ford led the first large-scale excavations at Poverty Point, Louisiana. He pursued this project, with breaks, until his death. He discovered the ridge structure of the pre-Columbian earthworks as the unique features of that site. His experiments with loess soil, to find the purpose of the hundreds of thousands Poverty Point objects, were the beginnings of experimental archaeology in North America. But his theories about the origin of the Poverty Point culture were later made obsolete by new evidence. His samples and results of radiocarbon dating were inaccurate due to the very early stages of that technology. In 1958 he excavated the Menard–Hodges site in southeastern Arkansas.

James A. Ford died of cancer on February 25, 1968, in Gainesville, Florida.

== Bibliography ==
- Ford, James Alfred 1954 "The History of the Peruvian Valley [Viru Valley]", Scientific American.--NY, v. 191 no. 2, .28-34.
- Ford, James Alfred 1961 "In Favor of Simple Typology." American Antiquity.--Salt Lake City, v. 27, no. 1 p. 113-114
- Ford, James Alfred 1952 "Mound Builders of the Mississippi." Scientific American.--NY, v. 186, no. 3, p. 22-27
- Ford, James Alfred 1954 "On the Concept of Types, an article by J.A. Ford with discussion by J.H. Steward." American Anthropologist.--Menasha, Wis., n.s., v. 56, p. 42-57
- Ford, James Alfred 1952 "Reply to 'The Viru Valley sequence: a critical review'." American Antiquity.--Salt Lake City, v. XVII, p. 250
