= Winterville site =

Archaeological site in Mississippi, US

Winterville Site
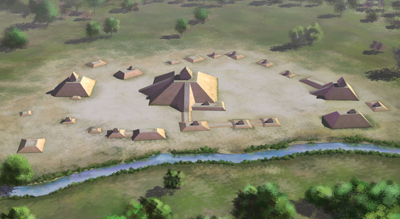
- Artist's conception of the Winterville Site

- Location in Mississippi today
- 33°29′9″N 91°3′40″W
- Periods: Winterville Phase
- Cultures: Plaquemine Mississippian culture
- Location: Washington County, Mississippi, US
- Region: Washington County, Mississippi

History
- Abandoned: 1450

Site notes
- Architectural styles: platform mounds, plazas
- Winterville Site
- U.S. National Register of Historic Places
- U.S. National Historic Landmark
- Mississippi Landmark
- NRHP reference No.: 73001031

Significant dates
- Added to NRHP: August 17, 1973
- Designated NHL: September 14, 1993
- Designated USMS: May 1, 1986
- Excavation dates: 1967
- Archaeologists: Jeffrey P. Brain
- Responsible body: State

The Winterville Site (22 WS 500) is a major archaeological site in unincorporated Washington County, Mississippi, north of Greenville and along the river. It consists of major earthwork monuments, including more than twelve large platform mounds and cleared and filled plazas. It is the type site for the Winterville Phase (1200 to 1400) of the Lower Yazoo Basin region of the Plaquemine Mississippian culture. Protected as a state park, it has been designated as a National Historic Landmark.

In June 2015 the state authorized $300,000 to restore the mounds to their pre-Columbian condition and add walking trails to the park. The site also includes a museum.

== Winterville Mounds ==
Winterville Mounds, named for the nearby town of Winterville, Mississippi, is the site of a prehistoric ceremonial center built by Native Americans of the Plaquemine culture, the regional variation of the Mississippian culture. This civilization thrived from about 1000 to 1450 CE. The earthwork mounds, an expression of the Winterville society's religious and political system, were the site of sacred structures and ceremonies. They were built between 1200 and 1250. Archaeological evidence indicates that the Winterville people lived away from the mound center on family farms in scattered settlement districts throughout the Yazoo-Mississippi River Delta basin. Only a few of the higher-ranking tribal officials lived at this mound complex.

The Winterville ceremonial center originally contained at least twenty-three platform mounds surrounding several large, filled and smoothed plazas. Some of the mounds located outside current park boundaries were leveled by farming and highway construction before the site became protected as Winterville State Park.

Twelve of the site's largest mounds, including the 55 feet (17 m) high Temple Mound, are the focus in the early 21st century of a long-range preservation plan being developed by the Mississippi Department of Archives and History and the University of Mississippi's Center for Archaeological Research. In June 2015 the state legislature authorized $300,000 for a project to restore the mounds to their pre-Columbian condition. Trees and brush will be removed. In addition, two walking trails will be added to the park.

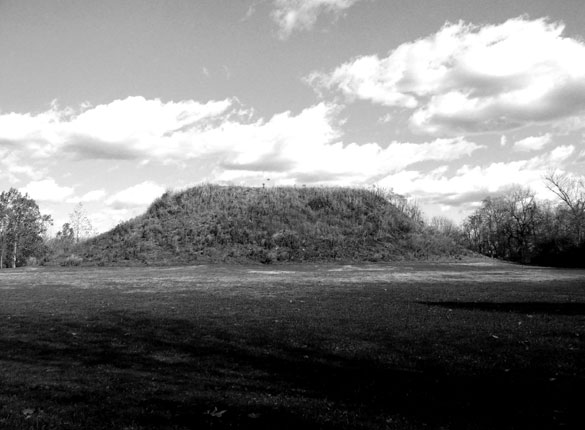
Mound A, the largest mound at the site

Archaeological evidence indicates that there are continuities in culture between the residents of the Winterville Mounds and the later Natchez Indians, a Mississippi tribe documented by French explorers and settlers in the early 18th century. The Natchez Indians' society was divided into upper and lower ranks, with a person's social rank determined by heredity through the female line in their matrilineal kinship system. The chief and other tribal officials inherited their positions as members of the royal family. Such an elaborate leadership network was able to direct the mound building at Winterville by an organized civilian labor force. But, there is no evidence of a large residential population at this site or other similar sites. This lack of artifacts and remains indicates that this site was mostly used for ceremonial purposes.

A great fire during the late 14th century consumed the original building on the Temple Mound at Winterville. According to archaeological evidence, the cause of the fire remains a mystery. The site continued to be used afterward, but no more mounds were built or maintained. Although the site continued to be occupied after the fire, the general population declined at Winterville while increasing at settlements and mound sites 50 miles to the south, in the lower Yazoo River basin. By AD 1450 the Winterville Mound site appears to have been abandoned completely. The period of the site's greatest florescence was used by archaeologists as the basis for describing the Winterville Phase (1200 to 1400 CE) of the Lower Yazoo Basin region.

The first modern archaeological excavations at the Winterville Site were conducted in the 1940s by the National Park Service and Harvard University's Lower Mississippi Survey. Jeffrey P. Brain directed excavations at Winterville in 1967 and his report, Winterville: Late Prehistoric Culture Contact in the Lower Mississippi Valley, was published in 1989 by the Mississippi Department of Archives and History. Burials and structural remains were found at the site, along with items such as ceramic and stone artifacts; the latter can be seen at the Winterville Museum in the park.

Winterville Mounds was dedicated as a Mississippi state park in March 1969. The site was designated as a National Historic Landmark in 1993. The mounds are listed on the Mississippi Mound Trail.

== Culture, phase and chronological table ==
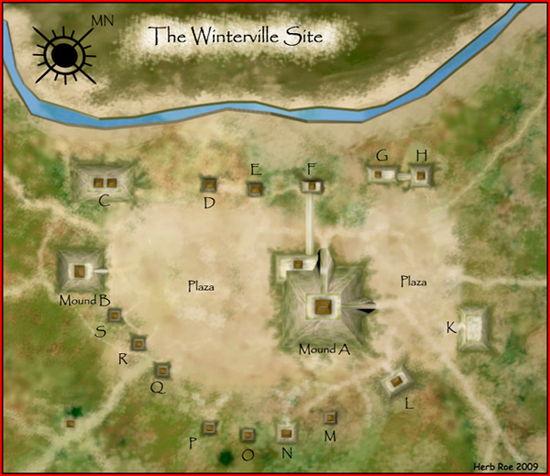
Illustrated aerial view of the Winterville Site

Culture or cultural tradition	Phase	Dates
Mississippian	Russell (Tunica)	1650 CE to 1750 CE
Mississippian	Wasp Lake	1500 to 1650 CE
Mississippian	Lake George	1400 to 1500 CE
Plaquemine	Winterville	1200 to 1400 CE
Coles Creek	Crippen Point	1050 CE to 1200 CE
Coles Creek	Kings Crossing	950 CE to 1050 CE
Coles Creek	Aden	800 CE to 950 CE
Baytown	Bayland	600 to 800 CE
Baytown	Deasonville	400 CE to 600 CE ?
Marksville	Issaquena / Paxton	200 to 400 CE?
Marksville	Anderson Landing	0 CE to 200 CE?
Tchefuncte	Tuscola	400 to 0 CE ?
Poverty Point	McGary	900 BCE to 400 BCE ?
Poverty Point	Jaketown	2000 BCE to 900 BCE ?

=== Pottery ===
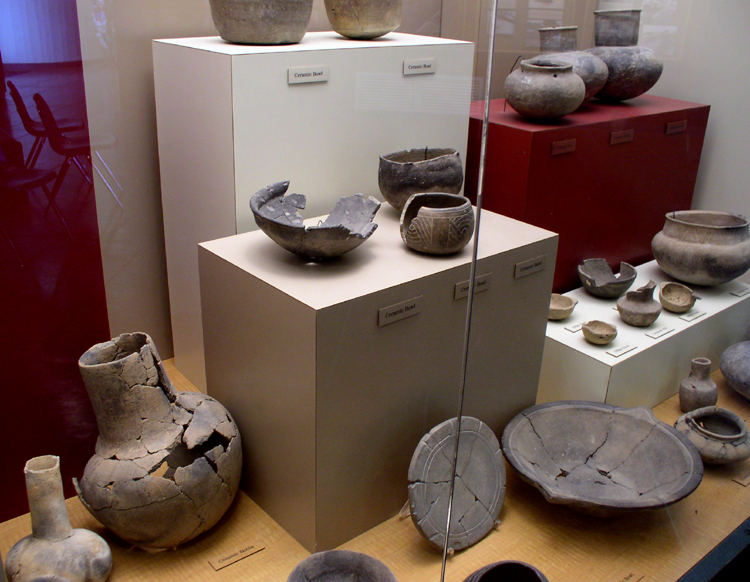
An assortment of pottery found at the site, on display at the site museum.

The Winterville people made pottery by building up strips of clay, and then smoothing them out, much like other pottery in the Eastern American area where the potter's wheel was unknown. They tempered the pottery with ground mussel shell, grit, grog, and angular bits of clay. Surface treatment ranged from carelessly polished to very finely polished. Forms for the pottery range from shallow plate like bowls to beakers and jars, with some pieces having animal effigies for handles. Surface decorations range from plain to incised S.E.C.C. designs.

Most pottery found at the Winterville Site are of the kinds known as Addis Plain var. Addis, Addis Plain var. Greenville and Addis Plain var. Holly Bluff. Some of the Mississippian culture pottery found at Winterville is believed to have been imported from other Mississippian societies (possibly from Cahokia or Cahokian-influenced peoples). Examples of these are pieces of pottery from the Nodena Red and White var. Dumond and Walls Engraved var. Walls. These examples have distinctive red and white slips, thinner walls, and more finely finished surfaces than locally produced wares and may have been valued for their exotic qualities and fine workmanship.

== See also ==
- Southeastern Ceremonial Complex
- List of Mississippian sites
- List of National Historic Landmarks in Mississippi
