= Grand Village of the Natchez =

- U.S. National Register of Historic Places
- U.S. National Historic Landmark
- Mississippi Landmark
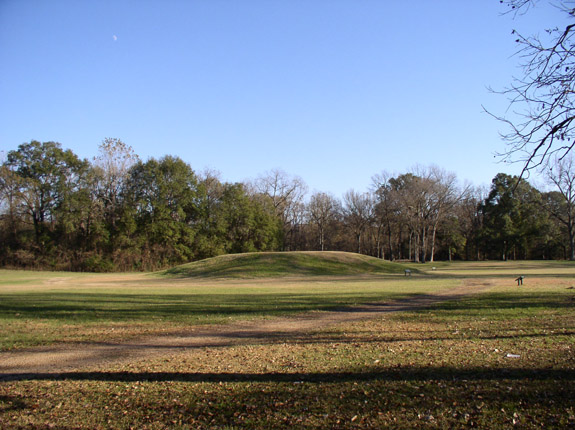
- Main mound at the Grand Village of the Natchez Site in Natchez, Mississippi

- Location within Mississippi Location within the United States
- Nearest city: 400 Jefferson Davis Boulevard, Natchez, Mississippi
- Coordinates: 31.525205°N 91.381638°W
- NRHP reference No.: 66000408

Significant dates
- Added to NRHP: October 15, 1966
- Designated NHL: July 19, 1964
- Designated USMS: May 9, 1985

Grand Village of the Natchez (22 AD 501), also known as the Fatherland Site, is a 128.1-acre (0.518 km^{2}) site encompassing a prehistoric indigenous village and earthwork mounds in present-day south Natchez, Mississippi. The village complex was constructed starting about 1200 CE by members of the prehistoric Plaquemine culture. They built the three platform mounds in stages. Another phase of significant construction work by these prehistoric people has been dated to the mid-15th century. It was named for the historic Natchez people, who used the site in the 17th and 18th centuries.

In the early 18th century, when the historic Natchez people occupied the site, they added to the mounds.

The village was the Natchez tribe's main political and religious ceremonial center in the late 17th and early 18th centuries, according to historical and archaeological evidence. It replaced the Emerald Mound site in this role. After suffering a military defeat by French settlers in 1730, the Natchez abandoned the site and moved away. In the early 19th century, the land was privately owned and cultivated as part of the Fatherland Plantation. Archaeological excavations started in 1930, and three mounds were found. (They had been partially buried by loess soils, with some erosion due to St. Catherine's Creek.)

The site was declared a National Historic Landmark in 1964 and a Mississippi Landmark in 1985. The site is listed on the Mississippi Mound Trail.

== History ==
Construction began at the site during the Anna phase of the prehistoric Plaquemine culture about 1200 CE. All of the varying soils used to build the mounds was carried by laborers by hand, probably in woven baskets. Skilled specialists knew how to use different soils to create the most stability. Later leaders directed additional work in the mid-15th century, in the Emerald phase of the Plaquemine culture. The site had three ceremonial platform mounds.

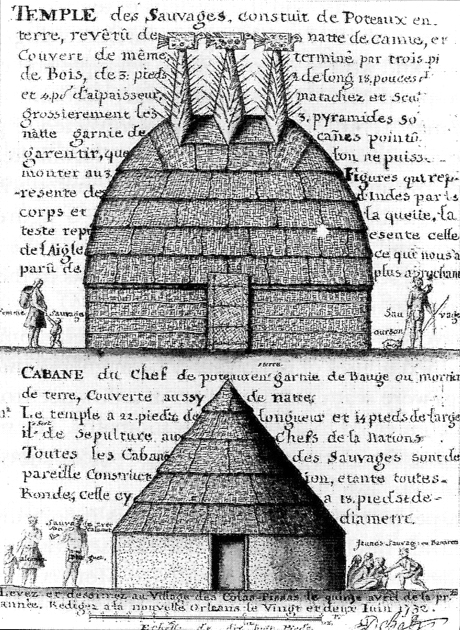
The Temple and Chiefs cabin at the Grand Village of the Natchez

Between 1682 and 1729, the Natchez people used the village as their main ceremonial center, as noted in contemporary French accounts. The three mounds were used for major religious and political ceremonies. First called Mound A, B and C by researchers, they are now known as Abandoned Mound, Sun Mound and Temple Mound, respectively. The Sun and Temple Mounds have been excavated and reconstructed, while the Abandoned Mound has not.

From 1700 to 1730, the Natchez added more construction at Mounds B and C. On top of Mound B they built the residence of the Great Sun, the paramount chief of the tribe. Mound C was the platform for the Sun Temple, which included a charnel house for the remains of the Natchez elite. By the time of European contact, the Natchez were no longer using Mound A. Most of the Natchez people lived dispersed in small villages in the area and would gather for special occasions at the Grand Village. They were farmers and constructed permanent dwellings.

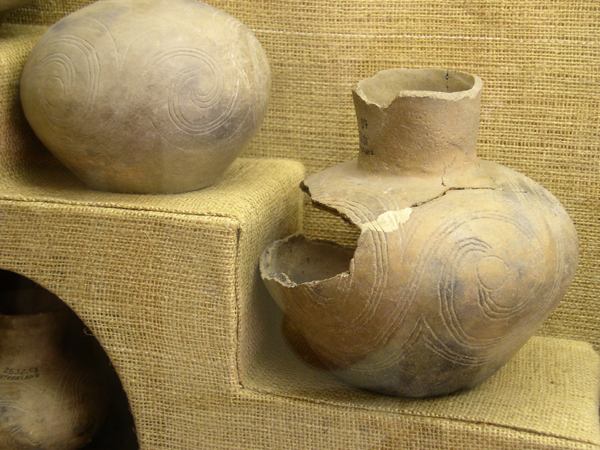
Natchez Plaquemine culture pottery from the Grand Village site

During this period, French settlers began to explore the region and establish settlements that gradually encroached on Natchez territory. Though relations were peaceful at first, the French colonists strained the resources the Natchez relied on for survival. Several episodes of violence in 1716 and 1723 created tension, although the Natchez made land concessions to the French.

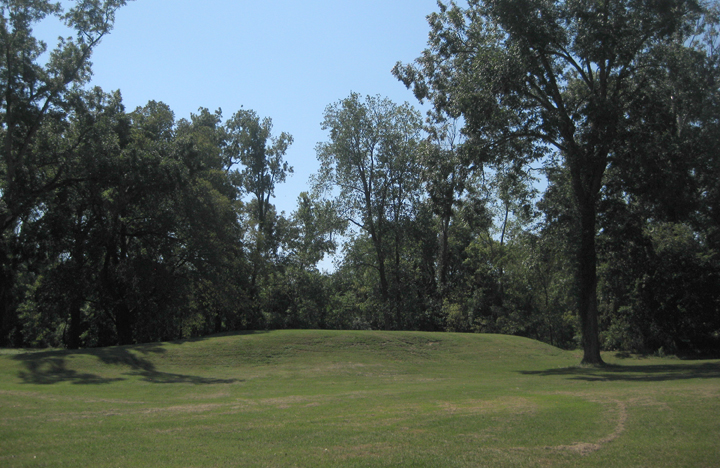
View of Temple Mound from the main plaza

The death of the Great Sun in 1728 contributed to social instability and tensions. His successor, the Young Sun, was more hostile to the French. In addition, the tribe was getting caught up in French and British rivalry in the region, each of which tried to maintain trade with the Natchez. In 1729, a pro-British group within the tribe attacked the French settlements at Fort Rosalie. The French retaliated with Indian allies and drove the Natchez out of the area. Some of the Natchez escaped and took refuge with other tribes, such as the Creek and Cherokee. After the French sold 300 Natchez survivors into slavery in the West Indies, the Natchez "ceased to exist as a cultural group."

In the late 19th century, researchers named the mound group after the Fatherland Plantation, established earlier that century on much of the site. Its owners had cultivated part of the area. When researchers later determined that this was the site called the "Grand Village of the Natchez" in French colonial records, they adopted that as the preferred name to honor the Natchez history at the site. Archaeological investigations and excavations at the site were conducted in 1930, 1962, and 1972 by the Mississippi Department of Archives and History (MDAH). Using evidence found in these, the state reconstructed mounds B and C to their original dimensions. Other institutions, such as the National Park Service, the University of Alabama, the University of North Carolina at Chapel Hill, and Harvard University's Lower Mississippi Survey have continued investigations alongside the MDAH.

The site is a national and state tourist attraction in Natchez. Managed by the state of Mississippi, the large property includes a museum, which holds numerous artifacts excavated from the site and an extensive collection of baskets made by area tribes, including native and European "grave goods" buried with the elite Natchez; a reconstructed Natchez house, based on historical and archeological evidence; picnic pavilion; and miles of nature trails. A mound area has been partially restored.

== See also ==
- List of National Historic Landmarks in Mississippi
- National Register of Historic Places listings in Adams County, Mississippi
- Mississippian culture
- Southeastern Ceremonial Complex
- List of Mississippian sites
- Tattooed Serpent (d. 1725)
