= Emerald Mound site =

- Emerald Mound Site
- U.S. National Register of Historic Places
- U.S. National Historic Landmark
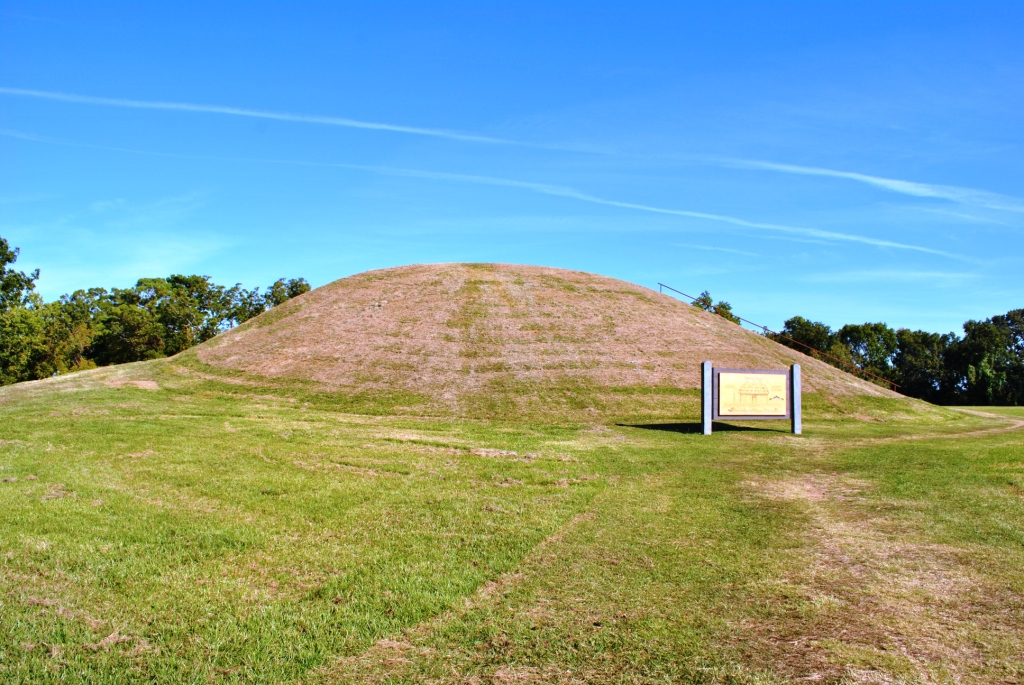
- Secondary mound at west end of Emerald Mound

- Location within Mississippi Location within the United States
- Nearest city: Stanton, Mississippi
- Coordinates: 31°38′9.98″N 91°14′50.02″W
- NRHP reference No.: 88002618

Significant dates
- Added to NRHP: November 18, 1988
- Designated NHL: December 29, 1989

The Emerald Mound Site (22 AD 504), also known as the Selsertown Site, is a Plaquemine culture Mississippian period archaeological site located on the Natchez Trace Parkway near Stanton, Mississippi, United States. The site dates from the period between 1200 and 1730 CE. It is the type site for the Emerald Phase (1500 to 1680 CE) of the Natchez Bluffs Plaquemine culture chronology and was still in use by the later historic Natchez people for their main ceremonial center. The platform mound is the second-largest Mississippian period earthwork in the country, after Monk's Mound at Cahokia, Illinois.

The mound covers eight acres, measuring 770 feet (230 m) by 435 feet (133 m) at the base and is 35 feet (11 m) in height. Emerald Mound has a flat top with two smaller secondary mounds at each end. It was constructed around a natural hill. Travelers in the early 19th century noted a number of adjoining mounds and an encircling ditch that are no longer present. This site once had six other secondary mounds which were lost due to the plowing of the surface of the mound. Emerald Mound was stabilized by the National Park Service in 1955. It was declared a National Historic Landmark in 1989. The mound is now managed by the Park Service's Natchez Trace Parkway unit, and is open to the public.

== Site prehistory ==
Emerald Mound was constructed during 1250 and 1600 CE, and is the type site for the Emerald Phase (1500 - 1680) of the Plaquemine culture Natchez Bluffs chronology. It was used as a ceremonial center for a population who resided in outlying villages and hamlets, but takes its name from the historic Emerald Plantation that surrounded the mound in the 19th century. The large mound began as a natural hill, which was built up by workers' depositing earth along the sides, reshaping it and creating an elongated, pentagonal-shaped, artificial plateau. Two smaller mounds sit on either end of the summit of the primary mound. The larger of the two sits at the western end, and measures 190 feet (58 m) by 160 feet (49 m) at the base and is 30 feet (9.1 m) in height. The smaller mounds on the summit are believed to be platforms for homes of chiefs and other key leaders.

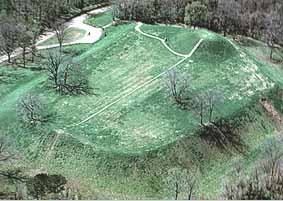
Emerald Mound as seen from the air

The summit of the mound is roughly 65 feet (20 m) above the surrounding landscape. Early drawings suggest that six smaller mounds, three on either side, flanked the edges of the primary mound between the two secondary mounds, but were flattened by erosion and plowing in the 19th century. Originally a constructed ditch, part of the earthworks, encircled the entire complex.

Archaeologists believe that the Plaquemine culture builders were the ancestors of the historic Natchez, who inhabited the area and used Emerald Mound Site as their main ceremonial center at time of first European contact. At its height, Emerald would have been the center of religious and civic rituals for the area, with the ceremonial center located on top of Emerald Mound, an unusual feature rarely seen in other mound centers. The secondary mounds were the bases of a temple and residence of a priest or ruler and other elites. By the late 1730s, the Natchez had abandoned Emerald, possibly because of social upheaval that followed extensive fatalities from European diseases introduced to the American Southeast by the de Soto expedition in the 1540s. By the time of the La Salle Expedition of 1682, the tribe's main ceremonial center was located at the Grand Village of the Natchez or Fatherland Site, 12 miles (19 km) to the southwest. Emerald was abandoned during the French colonial period, and the hereditary chief lived at the Grand Village. The people of the tribe lived in a widely dispersed settlement pattern, mainly in small hamlets and on family farms. They periodically assembled at the ceremonial centers for religious and social events. This settlement appears to have been one of the last active expressions of the large platform mound-building culture along the Mississippi River.

== Archaeological excavations ==
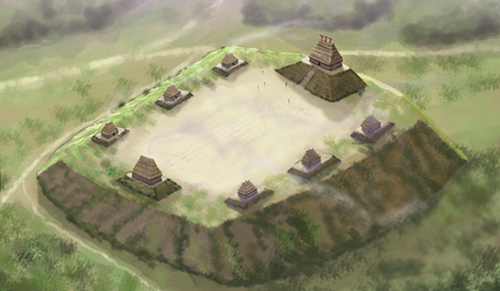
Locations of the 8 secondary mounds

The site, originally known as the Selsertown Site, derives its present name from the nearby antebellum-era Emerald Plantation. The first excavations took place in 1838, and were recorded by John C. Van Tramp in his book Prairie and Rocky Mountain Adventures, or, Life In The West. Measurements were taken, pottery and skeletons exhumed, and the investigators noted the eight secondary mounds and a large encircling trench. Over the intervening years, periodic excavations have taken place, most recently in 1972. Animal remains, ceramic fragments, tools, and the stratigraphy—all studied by National Park Service archeologists—offer a glimpse into the life of Emerald's ancient inhabitants.

The owners donated the site to the National Park Service (NPS) during the 1950s. Due to damage caused by erosion of the secondary mounds, the NPS restored the mounds and turfed the surfaces in the mid-50s. A trail and stairways were constructed from the parking lot adjacent to the mound, leading to the surface of the primary platform and to the tops of the larger of the secondary mounds. The staircases have since been removed.

The mound is listed on the Mississippi Mound Trail.

== See also ==
- List of Mississippian sites
- Mississippi Valley: Culture, phase, and chronological periods table - List of archaeological periods
- List of National Historic Landmarks in Mississippi
- National Register of Historic Places listings in Adams County, Mississippi
- Fairchild Creek (Mississippi)
