= Mound Builders =

Pre-Columbian cultures of North America

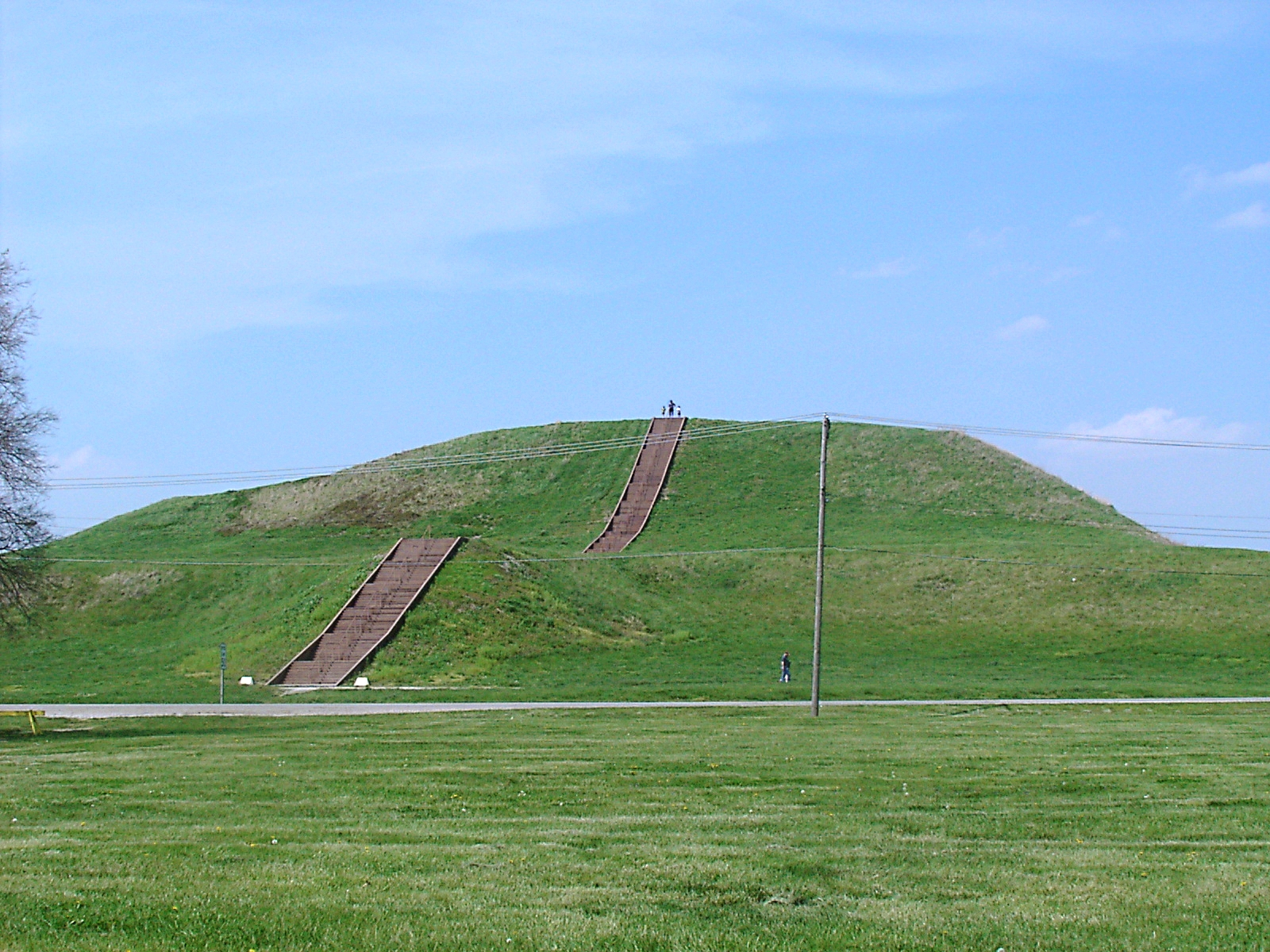
Monks Mound, built c. 950–1100 CE and located at the Cahokia Mounds UNESCO World Heritage Site near Collinsville, Illinois, is the largest pre-Columbian earthwork in America north of Mesoamerica.

Many pre-Columbian cultures in North America were collectively termed "Mound Builders", but the term has no formal meaning. It does not refer to specific people or archaeological culture but refers to the characteristic mound earthworks that indigenous peoples erected for an extended period of more than 5,000 years. The "Mound Builder" cultures span the period of roughly 3500 BCE (the construction of Watson Brake) to the 16th century CE, including the Archaic period (Horr's Island), Woodland period (Caloosahatchee, Adena and Hopewell cultures), and Mississippian period. Geographically, the cultures were present in the region of the Great Lakes, the Ohio River Valley, Florida, and the Mississippi River Valley and its tributary waters. Outlying mounds exist in South Carolina at Santee and in North Carolina at Town Creek.

The first mound building was an early marker of political and social complexity among the cultures in the eastern part of what is now the United States. Watson Brake in Louisiana, constructed about 3500 BCE during the Middle Archaic period, is the oldest known and dated mound complex in North America. It is one of 11 mound complexes from this period found in the Lower Mississippi Valley. These cultures generally had developed hierarchical societies that had an elite. These commanded hundreds or even thousands of workers to dig up tons of earth with the hand tools available, move the soil long distances, and finally, workers to create the shape with layers of soil as directed by the builders. However early mounds found in Louisiana preceded such cultures and were products of hunter-gatherer cultures.

From about 800 CE, the mound-building cultures were dominated by the Mississippian culture, a large archaeological horizon, whose youngest descendants, the Plaquemine culture and the Fort Ancient culture, were still active at the time of European contact in the 16th century. One tribe of the Fort Ancient culture has been identified as the Mosopelea, presumably of southeast Ohio, who spoke an Ohio Valley Siouan language. The bearers of the Plaquemine culture were presumably speakers of the Natchez language isolate. The first written description of these cultures were made by members of Spanish explorer Hernando de Soto's expedition, between 1540 and 1542.

== Mounds ==
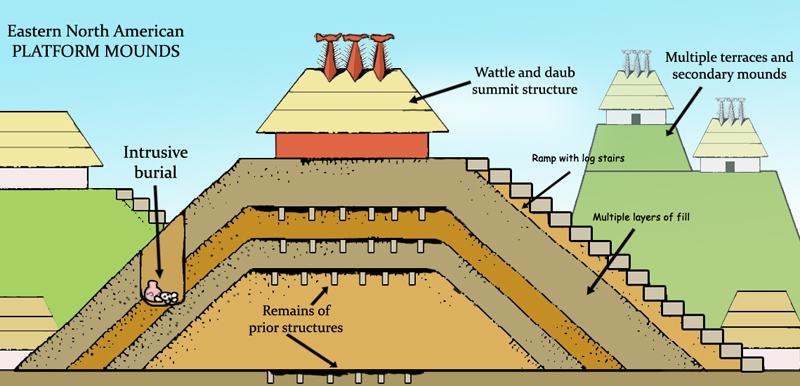
A mound diagram of the platform mound showing the multiple layers of mound construction, mound structures such as temples or mortuaries, ramps with log stairs, and prior structures under later layers, multiple terraces, and intrusive burials

The namesake cultural trait of the Mound Builders was the building of mounds and other earthworks. These burial and ceremonial structures were typically flat-topped pyramids or platform mounds, flat-topped or rounded cones, elongated ridges, and sometimes a variety of other forms. They were generally built as part of complex villages. The early earthworks built in Louisiana around 3500 BCE are the only ones known to have been built by a hunter-gatherer culture, rather than a more settled culture based on agricultural surpluses.

The best-known flat-topped pyramidal structure is Monks Mound at Cahokia, near present-day Collinsville, Illinois. This community was the center of the Mississippian culture. This mound appears to have been the main ceremonial and residential mound for the religious and political leaders; it is more than 100 feet (30 m) tall and is the largest pre-Columbian earthwork north of Mexico. This site had numerous mounds, some with conical or ridge tops, as well as palisaded stockades protecting the large settlement and elite quarter. At its maximum about 1150 CE, Cahokia was an urban settlement with 20,000–30,000 people.

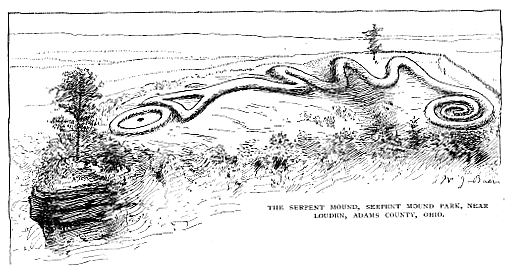
A depiction of the Serpent Mound in southern Ohio, as published in the magazine The Century, April 1890

Some effigy mounds were constructed in the shapes or outlines of culturally significant animals. The most famous effigy mound, Serpent Mound in southern Ohio, ranges from 1 foot (0.30 m) to just over 3 feet (0.91 m) tall, 20 feet (6.1 m) wide, more than 1,330 feet (410 m) long, and shaped as an undulating serpent.

=== Early descriptions ===
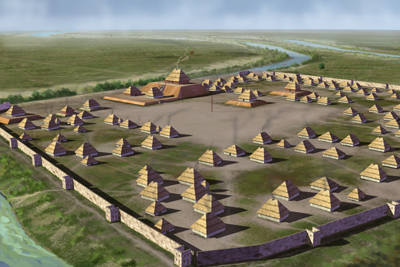
Illustration of the Parkin site, thought to be the capital of the province of Casqui visited by de Soto

Between 1540 and 1542, Hernando de Soto, the Spanish conquistador, traversed what became the southeastern United States. There he encountered many different mound-builder peoples who were perhaps descendants of the great Mississippian culture. De Soto observed people living in fortified towns with lofty mounds and plazas and surmised that many of the mounds served as foundations for priestly temples. Near present-day Augusta, Georgia, de Soto encountered a group ruled by the Lady of Cofitachequi. She told him that the mounds within her territory served as burial places for nobles.

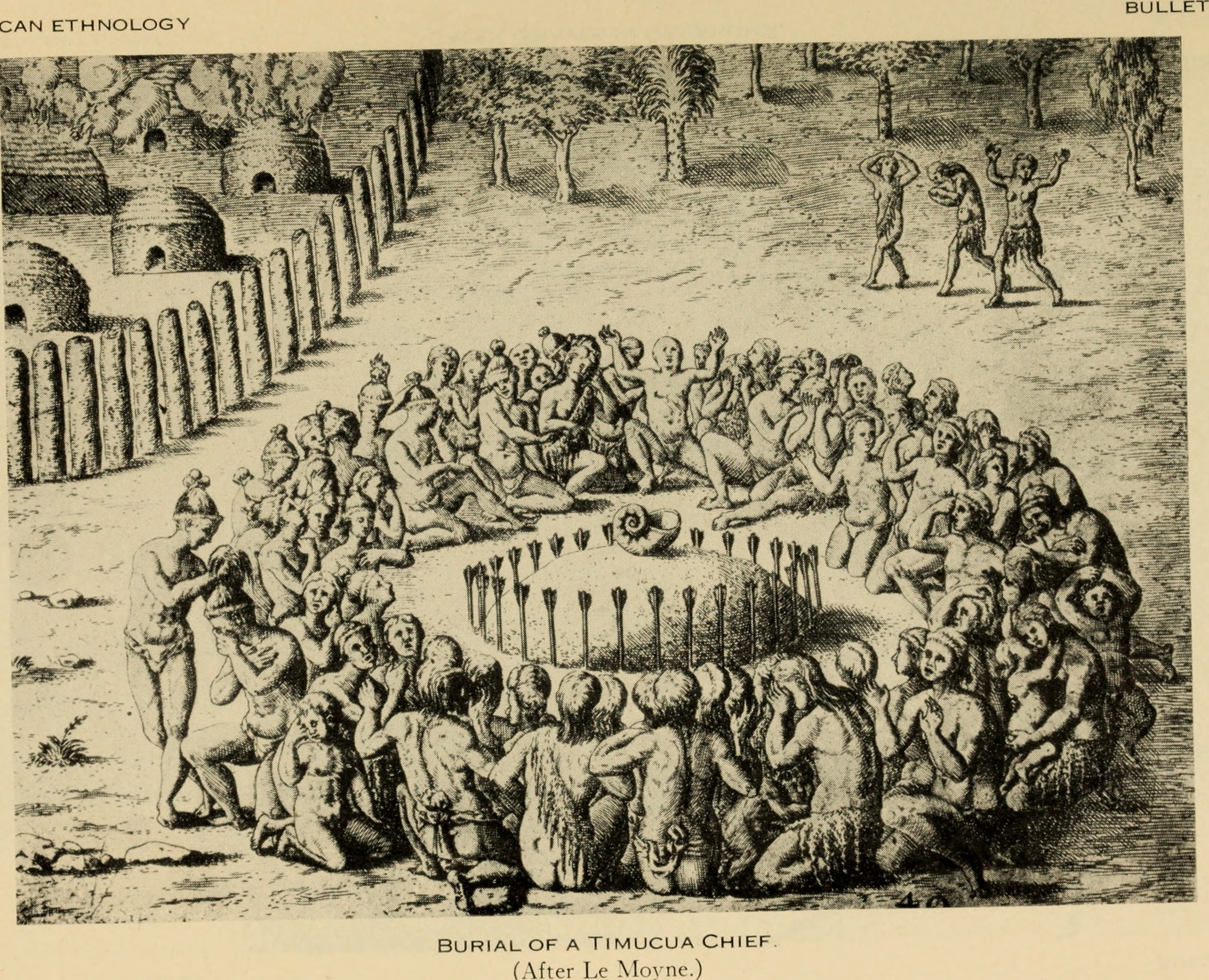
Engraving after Jacques le Moyne, showing the burial of a Timucua chief

The artist Jacques le Moyne, who had accompanied French settlers to northeastern Florida during the 1560s, likewise noted Native American groups using existing mounds and constructing others. He produced a series of watercolor paintings depicting scenes of native life. Although most of his paintings have been lost, some engravings were copied from the originals and published in 1591 by a Flemish company. Among these is a depiction of the burial of an aboriginal Floridian tribal chief, an occasion of great mourning and ceremony. The original caption reads:

Sometimes the deceased king of this province is buried with great solemnity, and his great cup from which he was accustomed to drink is placed on a tumulus with many arrows set about it.

— Jacques le Moyne, 1560s

Maturin Le Petit, a Jesuit priest, met the Natchez people, as did Le Page du Pratz (1758), a French explorer. Both observed them in the area that today is known as Mississippi. The Natchez were devout worshippers of the sun. Having a population of some 4,000, they occupied at least nine villages and were presided over by a paramount chief, known as the Great Sun, who wielded absolute power. Both observers noted the high temple mounds that the Natchez had built so that the Great Sun could commune with God, the sun. His large residence was built atop the highest mound, from "which, every morning, he greeted the rising sun, invoking thanks and blowing tobacco smoke to the four cardinal directions".

=== Archaeological surveys ===
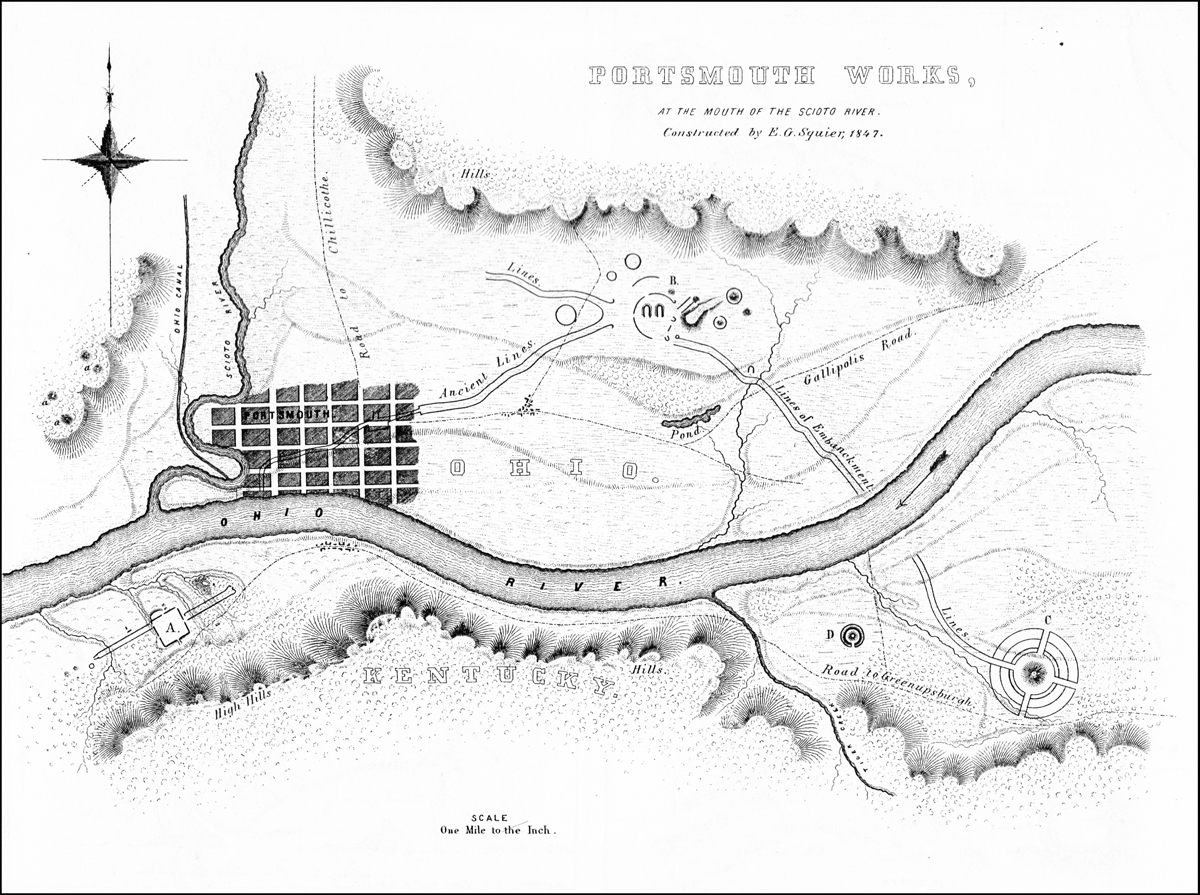
A depiction of the Portsmouth Earthworks in Ancient Monuments of the Mississippi Valley

The most complete reference for these earthworks is Ancient Monuments of the Mississippi Valley, written by Ephraim G. Squier and Edwin H. Davis. It was published in 1848 by the Smithsonian Institution, which had commissioned the survey. Since many of the features that the authors documented have been destroyed or diminished by farming and development, their surveys, sketches, and descriptions are still used by modern archaeologists. All of the sites that they identified as located in Kentucky came from the manuscripts of Constantine Samuel Rafinesque.

== Chronology ==
=== Archaic era ===
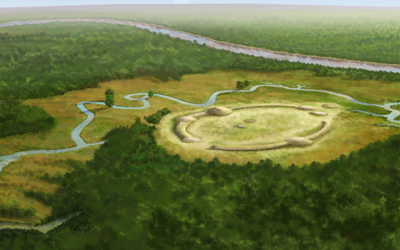
Illustration of Watson Brake, the oldest known mound complex in North America

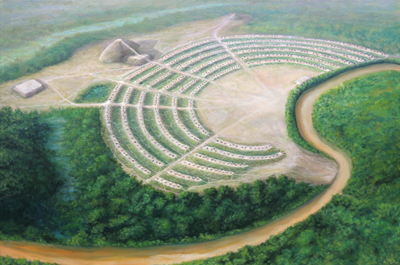
Illustration of Poverty Point in West Carroll Parish, Louisiana

Radiocarbon dating has established the age of the earliest Archaic mound complex in southeastern Louisiana. One of the two Monte Sano Site mounds, excavated in 1967 before being destroyed for new construction at Baton Rouge, was dated at 6220 BP (plus or minus 140 years). Researchers at the time thought that such hunter-gatherer societies were not organizationally capable of this type of construction. It has since been dated as about 6500 BP or 4500 BCE, although not all agree.

Watson Brake is located in the floodplain of the Ouachita River near Monroe in northern Louisiana. Securely dated to about 5,400 years ago (around 3500 BCE), in the Middle Archaic period, it consists of a formation of 11 mounds from 3 feet (0.91 m) to 25 feet (7.6 m) tall, connected by ridges to form an oval nearly 900 feet (270 m) across. In the Americas, the building of complex earthwork mounds started at an early date, well before the pyramids of Egypt were constructed. Watson Brake was being constructed nearly 2,000 years before the better-known Poverty Point, and the building continued for 500 years. Middle Archaic mound construction seems to have ceased about 2800 BCE. Scholars have not ascertained the reason, but it may have been because of changes in river patterns or other environmental factors.

With the 1990s dating of Watson Brake and similar complexes, scholars established that pre-agricultural, pre-ceramic American societies could organize to accomplish complex construction during extended periods, invalidating scholars' traditional ideas of Archaic society. Watson Brake was built by a hunter-gatherer society, the people of which occupied this area only on a seasonal basis. Successive generations organized to build the complex mounds over 500 years. Their food consisted mostly of fish and deer, as well as available plants.

Poverty Point, built about 1500 BCE in what is now Louisiana, is a prominent example of Late Archaic mound-builder construction (around 2500 BCE – 1000 BCE). It is a striking complex of more than 1 square mile (2.6 km^{2}), where six earthwork crescent ridges were built in concentric arrangement, interrupted by radial aisles. Three mounds are also part of the main complex, and evidence of residences extends for about 3 miles (4.8 km) along the bank of Bayou Macon. It is the major site among 100 associated with the Poverty Point culture and is one of the best-known early examples of earthwork monumental architecture. Unlike the localized societies during the Middle Archaic, this culture showed evidence of a wide trading network outside its area, which is one of its distinguishing characteristics.

The Tomoka Mound Complex on the St. Johns River in Florida included a mound constructed between 4629 and 4000 BP (2679 to 2050 BCE). Horr's Island in Southwest Florida included a burial mound dated to 3400 BCE, making it the oldest known burial mound in North America.

=== Woodland period ===
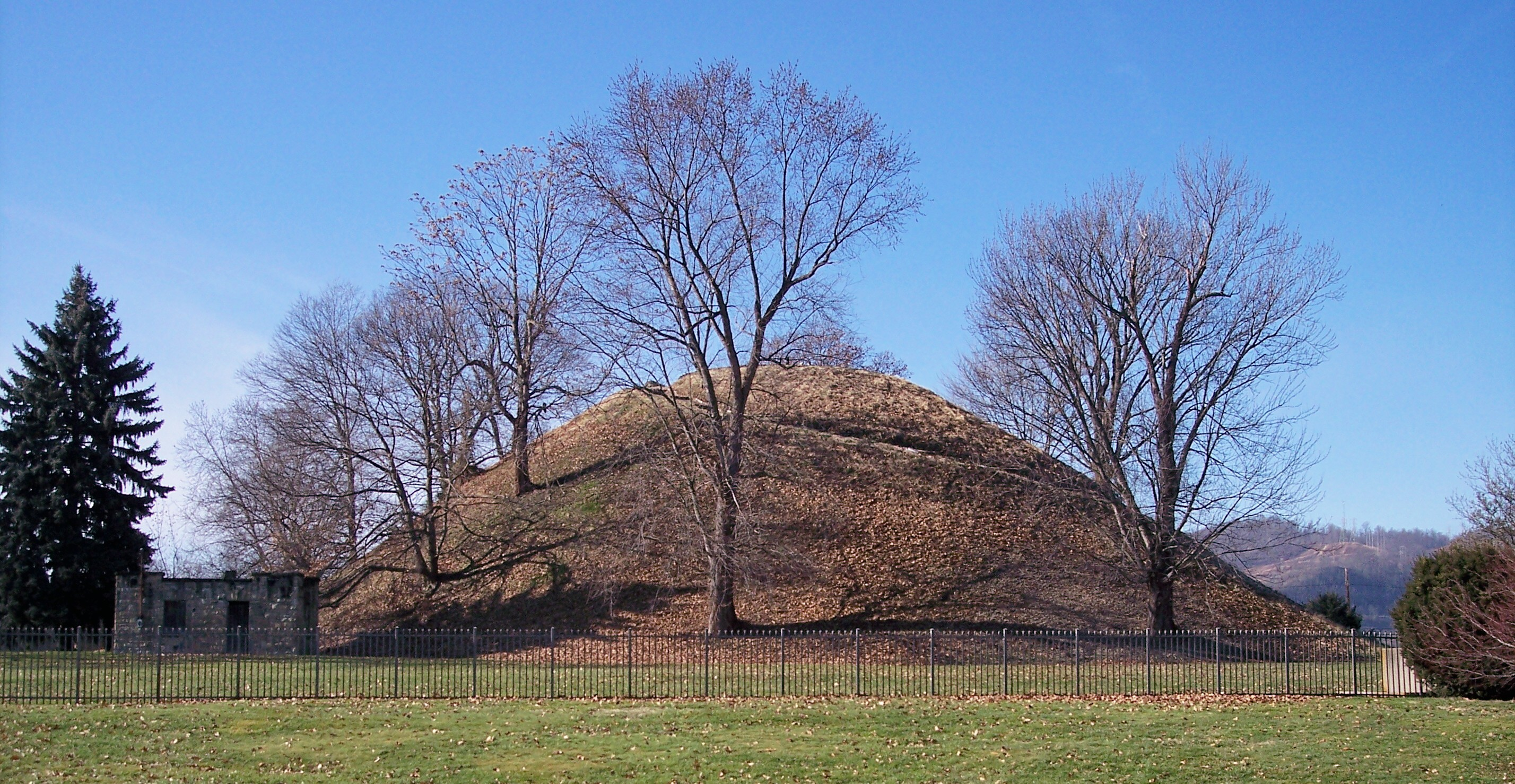
Grave Creek Mound, Moundsville, West Virginia, Adena culture

The oldest mound associated with the Woodland period was the mortuary mound and pond complex at the Fort Center site in Glade County, Florida. Excavations and dating in 2012 by Thompson and Pluckhahn show that work began around 2600 BCE, seven centuries before the mound-builders in Ohio.

The Archaic period was followed by the Woodland period (circa 1000 BCE). Some well-understood examples are the Adena culture of Ohio, West Virginia, and parts of nearby states. The subsequent Hopewell culture built monuments from present-day Illinois to Ohio; it is renowned for its geometric earthworks. The Adena and Hopewell were not the only mound-building peoples during this period. Contemporaneous mound-building cultures existed throughout what is now the Eastern United States, stretching as far south as Crystal River in western Florida. During this time, in parts of present-day Mississippi, Arkansas, and Louisiana, the Hopewellian Marksville culture degenerated and was succeeded by the Baytown culture. Reasons for degeneration include attacks from other tribes or the impact of severe climatic changes undermining agriculture.

=== Coles Creek culture ===
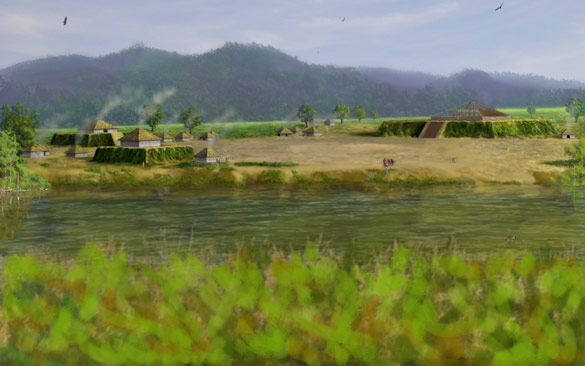
Illustration of Kings Crossing site in Warren County, Mississippi

The Coles Creek culture is a Late Woodland culture (700–1200 CE) in the Lower Mississippi Valley in the Southern United States that marks a significant change in the cultural history of the area. Population and cultural and political complexity increased, especially by the end of the Coles Creek period. Although many of the classic traits of chiefdom societies had not yet developed, by 1000 CE, the formation of simple elite polities had begun. Coles Creek sites are found in Arkansas, Louisiana, Oklahoma, Mississippi, and Texas. The Coles Creek culture is considered ancestral to the Plaquemine culture.

=== Mississippian cultures ===
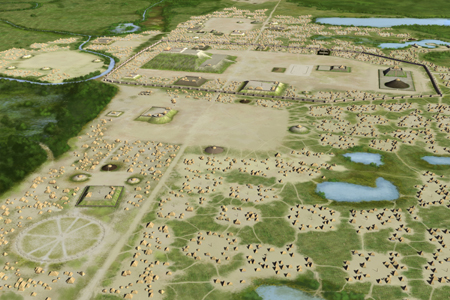
Illustration of Cahokia with the large Monks Mound in the central precinct, encircled by a palisade, surrounded by four plazas, notably the Grand Plaza to the south

Around 900–1450 CE, the Mississippian culture developed and spread through the Eastern United States, primarily along the river valleys. The largest regional center where the Mississippian culture was first definitely developed is located in Illinois along a tributary of the Mississippi and is referred to as Cahokia. It had several regional variants including the Middle Mississippian culture of Cahokia, the South Appalachian Mississippian variant at Moundville and Etowah, the Plaquemine Mississippian variant in south Louisiana and Mississippi, and the Caddoan Mississippian culture of northwestern Louisiana, eastern Texas, and southwestern Arkansas. Like the mound builders of the Ohio, these peoples built gigantic mounds as burial and ceremonial places.

=== Fort Ancient culture ===
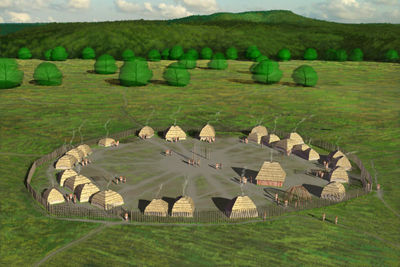
Artist's conception of the Fort Ancient culture SunWatch Indian Village

Fort Ancient is the name for a Native American culture that flourished from 1000 to 1650 CE among a people who predominantly inhabited land along the Ohio River in areas of modern-day southern Ohio, northern Kentucky, and western West Virginia.

=== Plaquemine culture ===
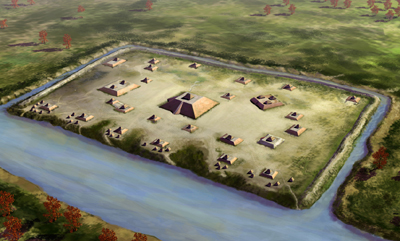
Illustration of the Holly Bluff site in Yazoo County, Mississippi

A continuation of the Coles Creek culture in the lower Mississippi River Valley in western Mississippi and eastern Louisiana. Examples include the Medora site in West Baton Rouge Parish, Louisiana; and the Anna and Emerald Mound sites in Mississippi. Sites inhabited by Plaquemine peoples continued to be used as vacant ceremonial centers without large village areas much as their Coles Creek ancestors had done, although their layout began to show influences from Middle Mississippian peoples to the north. The Winterville and Holly Bluff (Lake George) sites in western Mississippi are good examples that exemplify this change of layout, but a continuation of site usage. During the Terminal Coles Creek period (1150 to 1250 CE), contact increased with Mississippian cultures centered upriver near the future St. Louis, Missouri. This resulted in the adaption of new pottery techniques, as well as new ceremonial objects and possibly new social patterns during the Plaquemine period. As more Mississippian cultural influences were absorbed, the Plaquemine area as a distinct culture began to shrink after CE 1350. Eventually, the last enclave of purely Plaquemine culture was the Natchez Bluffs area, while the Yazoo Basin and adjacent areas of Louisiana became a hybrid Plaquemine-Mississippi culture. This division was recorded by Europeans when they first arrived in the area. In the Natchez Bluffs area, the Taensa and Natchez people had held out against Mississippian influence and continued to use the same sites as their ancestors. The Plaquemine culture is considered directly ancestral to these historic period groups encountered by Europeans. Groups who appear to have absorbed more Mississippian influence were identified as those tribes speaking the Tunican, Chitimachan, and Muskogean languages.

=== Disappearance ===
Following the description by Jacques le Moyne in 1560, the mound-building cultures seem to have disappeared within the next century. However, there were also other European accounts, earlier than 1560, that give a first-hand description of the enormous earth-built mounds being constructed by Native Americans. One of them was Garcilaso de la Vega (c.1539–1616), a Spanish chronicler also known as "El Inca" because of his Incan mother. He was the record-keeper of the noted De Soto expedition that landed in present-day Florida on May 31, 1538. Garcilaso gave a first-hand description in his Historia de la Florida (published in 1605, Lisbon, as La Florida del Inca) describing how the Indians had built mounds and how the Native American mound cultures practiced their traditional way of life. De la Vega's accounts also include vital details about the Native American tribes' systems of government present in the southeast, tribal territories, and the construction of mounds and temples. A few French expeditions in the 1560s reported staying with Indian societies who had built mounds.

==== Diseases ====
Later explorers to the same regions, only a few decades after mound-building settlements had been reported, found the regions largely depopulated with its residents vanished and the mounds untended. Conflicts with Europeans were dismissed by historians as the major cause of population reduction since few clashes had occurred between the natives and the Europeans in the area during the same period. The most widely accepted explanation today is that new infectious diseases brought from the Old World, such as smallpox and influenza, had decimated most of the Native Americans from the last mound-builder civilization, as they had no immunity to such diseases.

The Fort Ancient culture of the Ohio River valley is considered a "sister culture" of the Mississippian horizon, or one of the "Mississippianised" cultures adjacent to the main area of the mound building cultures. This culture was also mostly extinct in the 17th century, but remnants may have survived into the first half of the 18th century.

While this culture shows strong Mississippian influences, its bearers were most likely ethnolinguistically distinct from the Mississippians, possibly belonging to the Siouan phylum. The only tribal name associated with the Fort Ancient culture in the historical record is the Mosopelea, recorded by Jean-Baptiste-Louis Franquelin in 1684 as inhabiting eight villages north of the Ohio River.

The Mosopelea is most likely identical to the Ofo (Oufé, Offogoula) recorded in the same area in the 18th century. The Ofo language was formerly classified as Muskogean but is now recognized as an eccentric member of the Western Siouan phylum. The late survival of the Fort Ancient culture is suggested by the remarkable amount of European-made goods in the archaeological record. Such artifacts would have been acquired by trade even before direct European contact. These artifacts include brass and steel items, glassware, and melted down or broken goods reforged into new items.

The Fort Ancient peoples are known to have been severely affected by disease in the 17th century (Beaver Wars period). Carbon dating seems to indicate that they were wiped out by successive waves of disease.

==== Massacre and revolt ====
Because of the disappearance of the cultures by the end of the 17th century, the identification of the bearers of these cultures was an open question in 19th-century ethnography. Modern stratigraphic dating has established that the "Mound builders" have spanned an extended period of more than five millennia so that any ethnolinguistic continuity is unlikely. The spread of the Mississippian culture from the late 1st millennium CE most likely involved cultural assimilation, in archaeological terminology called "Mississippianised" cultures.

19th-century ethnography assumed that the Mound-builders were an ancient prehistoric race with no direct connection to the Southeastern Woodland peoples of the historical period who were encountered by Europeans. A reference to this idea appears in the poem "The Prairies" (1832) by William Cullen Bryant.

The cultural stage of the Southeastern Woodland natives encountered in the 18th and 19th centuries by British colonists was deemed incompatible with the comparatively advanced stone, metal, and clay artifacts of the archaeological record. The age of the earthworks was also partly over-estimated.

Caleb Atwater's misunderstanding of stratigraphy caused him to significantly overestimate the age of the earthworks. In his book, Antiquities Discovered in the Western States (1820), Atwater claimed that "Indian remains" were always found right beneath the surface of the earth, while artifacts associated with the Mound Builders were found fairly deep in the ground. Atwater argued that they must be from a different group of people. The discovery of metal artifacts further convinced people that the Mound Builders were not identical to the Southeast Woodland Native Americans of the 18th century.

It is now thought that the most likely bearers of the Plaquemine culture, a late variant of the Mississippian culture, were ancestral to the related Natchez and Taensa peoples. The Natchez language is a language isolate.

The Natchez are known to have historically occupied the Lower Mississippi Valley. They are first mentioned in French sources of around 1700, when they were centered around the Grand Village close to present-day Natchez, Mississippi. In 1729 the Natchez revolted and massacred the French colony of Fort Rosalie. The French retaliated by destroying all the Natchez villages. The remaining Natchez fled in scattered bands to live among the Chickasaw, Creek, and Cherokee people. They traveled with them on the Trail of Tears when federal Indian removal policies after 1830 forced the Native Americans out of the Southeast and west of the Mississippi River to Indian Territory (admitted in the early 20th century as the state of Oklahoma). The Natchez language became extinct in the 20th century, with the death in 1957 of the last known native speaker, Nancy Raven.

== Maps ==
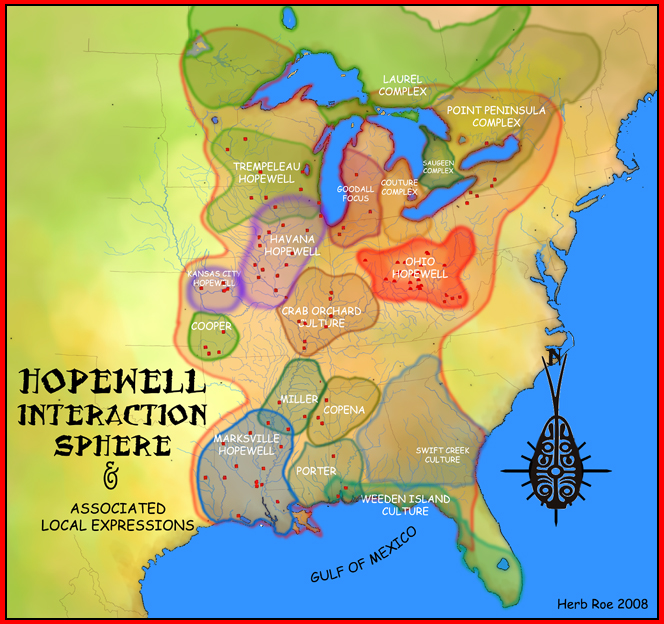
Hopewell traditions

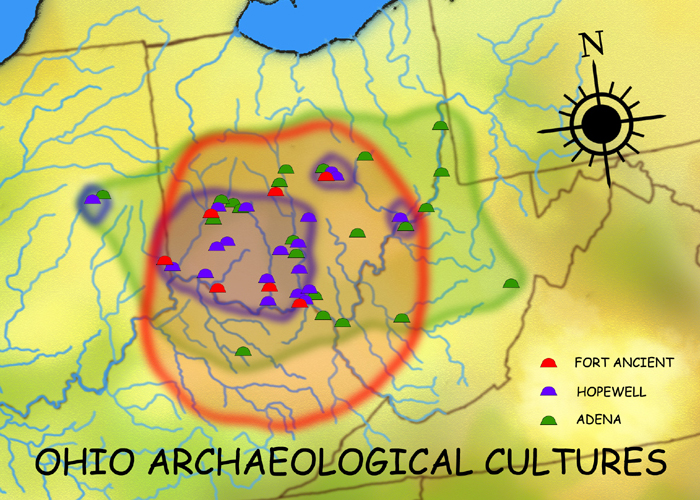
Adena culture

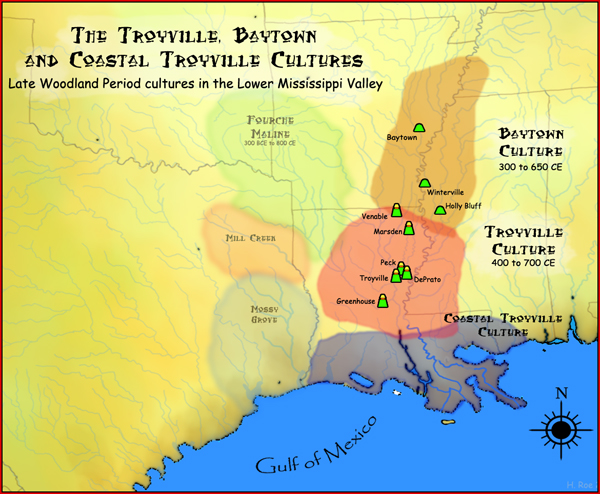
Troyville culture and Baytown culture

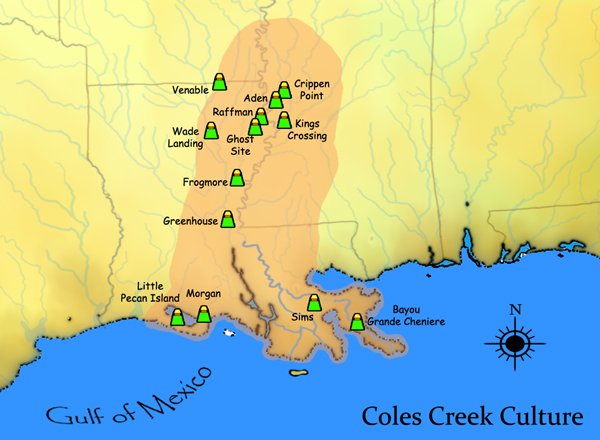
Coles Creek culture
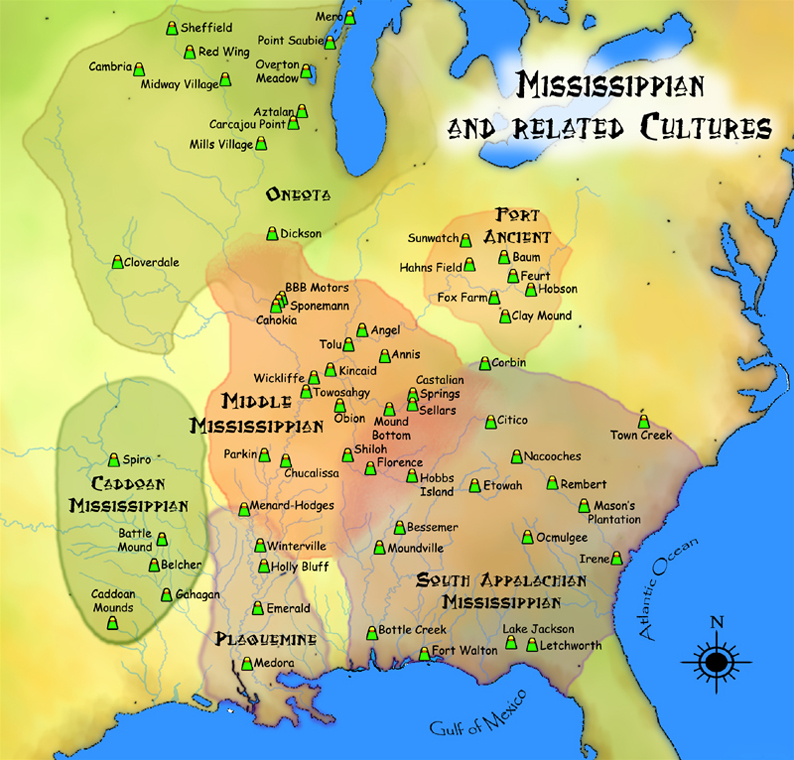
Mississippian culture

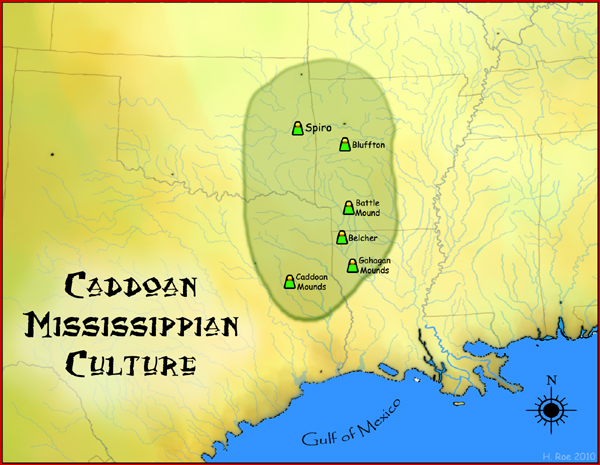
Caddoan Mississippian culture

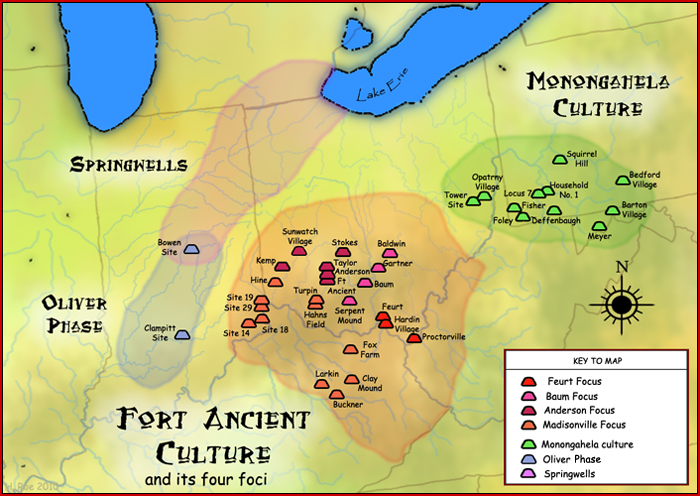
Fort Ancient culture

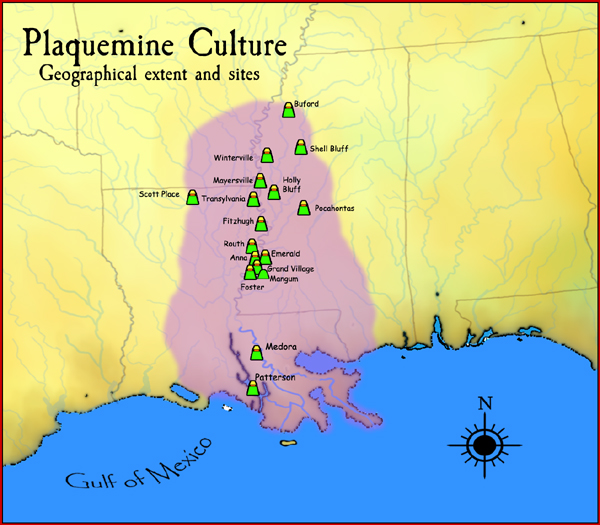
Plaquemine culture

== Pseudoarchaeology ==
=== The myth of the Mound Builders ===
Based on the idea that the origins of the mound builders lay with a mysterious ancient people, various other suggestions were belonging to the more general genre of Pre-Columbian trans-oceanic contact theories, specifically involving Vikings, Atlantis, and the Ten Lost Tribes of Israel, summarised by Feder (2006) under the heading of "The Myth of a Vanished Race".

Benjamin Smith Barton in his Observations on Some Parts of Natural History (1787) proposed the theory that the Mound Builders were associated with "Danes", i.e. with the Norse colonization of North America. In 1797, Barton reconsidered his position and correctly identified the mounds as part of indigenous prehistory.

Notable for the association with the Ten Lost Tribes is the Book of Mormon (1830). This provides a related belief, as its narrative describes two major immigrations to the Americas from Mesopotamia: the Jaredites (ca. 3000 - 2000 BCE) and an Israelite group during 590 BCE (termed Nephites, Lamanites and Mulekites). While the Nephites, Lamanites, and Mulekites were all of Jewish origin coming from Israel around 590 BCE, the Jaredites were a non-Abrahamic people separate in all aspects, except in a belief in Jehovah, from the Nephites. The Book of Mormon depicts these settlers building magnificent cities, which were destroyed by warfare about CE 385. The Book of Mormon can be placed in the tradition of the "Mound-Builder literature" of the period and has been called "the most famous and certainly the most influential of all Mound-Builder literature". Historian Richard Bushman argues the Book of Mormon does not comfortably fit the Mound Builder genre because contemporaneous writings that speculated about Native origins "were explicit about recognizable Indian practices" whereas the "Book of Mormon deposited its people on some unknown shore—not even definitely identified as America—and had them live out their history" without including tropes that Euro-Americans stereotyped as Indigenous.

Josiah Priest's 1833 400-page publication American Antiquities centered around his study of the Bible and antiquarian journals, supplemented by information from his travels. After visiting earthworks in Ohio and New York, Priest concluded that these mounds could be traced back to a lost race that had inhabited America even before the Native Americans. This idea is now referred to as the "mound builder myth" and still has supporters in society today. The book grew in popularity because of Priest's views on Native Americans. "It tapped into the widely accepted view of those times that Native Americans were merely bloodthirsty savages, bent on the destruction of all but their own race. It was inconceivable to Priest and like-minded men that a race so lazy and inept could conceive and build such huge, elaborate structures." Priest speculated that the original dwellers could be the Ten Lost Tribes of Israel.

The reasoning Priest gives for his conclusion that there was an even earlier settler than the Native Americans relies upon his interpretation of the Biblical flood story. According to Priest, after the great flood disappeared, Noah and his ark landed in America. While surveying the land, Noah also discovered mounds that had been constructed before the waters rose. Upon seeing this, Noah questioned where these agricultural phenomena came from. "Surveying the various themes of mound builder origins, he could not decide whether the mounds were the work of Polynesians, Egyptians, Greeks, Romans, Israelites, Scandinavians, Welsh, Scotts, or Chinese, although he felt certain the Indians had not built them." Priest's racism has also been discussed in detail by Robert Silverberg, archaeologist Stephen Williams, and author Jason Colavito. Later authors placing the Book of Mormon in this context include Silverberg, Brodie (1971), and Garlinghouse (2001).

Some nineteenth-century archaeological finds (e.g., earth and timber fortifications and towns, the use of a plaster-like cement, ancient roads, metal points and implements, copper breastplates, head-plates, textiles, pearls, native North American inscriptions, North American elephant remains etc.) were well-publicized at the time of the publication of the Book of Mormon and there is the incorporation of some of these ideas into the narrative. References are made in the Book of Mormon to a then-current understanding of pre-Columbian civilizations, including the formative Mesoamerican civilizations such as the (Pre-Classic) Olmec, Maya, and Zapotec.

Lafcadio Hearn in 1876 wrote about a theory that the mounds were built by people from the lost continent of Atlantis. The Reverend Landon West in 1901 claimed that the Serpent Mound in Ohio was built by God, or by man inspired by him. He believed that God built the mound and placed it as a symbol of the story of the Garden of Eden.

More recently, Black nationalist websites claiming association with the Moorish Science Temple of America, have taken up the Atlantean ("Mu") association of the Mound Builders. Similarly, the "Washitaw Nation", a group associated with the Moorish Science Temple of America established in the 1990s, has been associated with mound-building in Black nationalist online articles of the early 2000s.

=== Newark Holy Stone ===
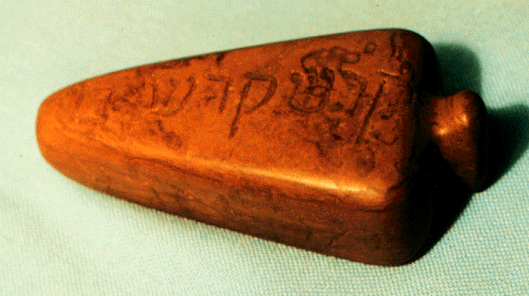
Keystone

On June 29, 1860, David Wyrick, the surveyor of Licking County near Newark, discovered the so-called "Keystone" in a shallow excavation at the monumental Newark Earthworks, which is an extraordinary set of ancient geometric enclosures created by Indigenous people. There he dug up a four-sided, plumb-bob-shaped stone with Hebrew letters engraved on each of its faces. The local Episcopal minister John W. McCarty translated the four inscriptions as "Law of the Lord", "Word of the Lord", "Holy of Holies", and "King of the Earth". Charles Whittlesey, who was one of the foremost archaeologists at that time, pronounced the stone to be authentic. The Newark Holy Stones, if genuine, would provide support for monogenesis, since they would establish that American Indians could be encompassed within Biblical history.

Decalogue Stone

After his first expedition, Wyrick uncovered a small stone box that was found to contain an intricately carved slab of black limestone covered with archaic-looking Hebrew letters along with a representation of a man in flowing robes. When translated, once again by McCarty, the inscription was found to include the entire Ten Commandments, and the robed figure was identified as Moses. Naturally enough, it became known as the Decalogue Stone.

Rather than being found beneath only a foot or two of soil, the Decalogue Stone was claimed to have been buried beneath a forty-foot-tall stone mound. Instead of modern Hebrew typography, the characters on the stone were blocky and appeared to be an ancient form of the Hebrew alphabet. Finally, the stone bore no resemblance to any modern Masonic artifact. In 1870, Whittlesey declared finally that the Holy Stones and other similar artifacts were "Archaeological Frauds".

=== Giants ===
In 19th-century America, many popular mythologies surrounding the origin of the mounds were in circulation, typically involving the mounds being built by a race of giants. A New York Times article from 1897 described a mound in Wisconsin in which a giant human skeleton measuring over 9 feet (2.7 m) in length was found. In 1886, another New York Times article described water receding from a mound in Cartersville, Georgia, which uncovered acres of skulls and bones, some of which were said to be gigantic. Two thigh bones were measured with the height of their owners estimated at 14 feet (4.3 m). President Abraham Lincoln referred to the giants whose bones fill the mounds of America.

But still there is more. It calls up the indefinite past. When Columbus first sought this continent – when Christ suffered on the cross – when Moses led Israel through the Red-Sea – nay, even, when Adam first came from the hand of his Maker – then as now, Niagara was roaring here. The eyes of that species of extinct giants, whose bones fill the mounds of America, have gazed on Niagara, as ours do now. Co[n]temporary with the whole race of men, and older than the first man, Niagara is strong, and fresh to-day as ten thousand years ago. The Mammoth and Mastodon – now so long dead, that fragments of their monstrous bones, alone testify, that they ever lived, have gazed on Niagara. In that long – long time, never still for a single moment. Never dried, never froze, never slept, never rested.

The antiquarian author William Pidgeon in 1858 created fraudulent surveys of mound groups that did not exist. Beginning in the 1880s, the supposed origin of the earthworks with a race of giants was increasingly recognized as spurious. Pidgeon's fraudulent claims about the archaeological record were shown to be a hoax by Theodore Lewis in 1886. A major factor contributing to public acceptance of the earthworks as a regular part of North American prehistory was the 1894 report by Cyrus Thomas of the Bureau of American Ethnology. Earlier authors making a similar case include Thomas Jefferson, who excavated a mound and from the artifacts and burial practices, noted similarities between mound-builder funeral practices and those of Native Americans in his time.

=== Walam Olum ===
The Walam Olum hoax had considerable influence on perceptions of the Mound Builders. In 1836, Constantine Samuel Rafinesque published his translation of a text he claimed had been written in pictographs on wooden tablets. This text explained that the Lenape Indians originated in Asia, told of their passage over the Bering Strait, and narrated their subsequent migration across the North American continent. This "Walam Olum" tells of battles with native peoples already in America before the Lenape arrived. People hearing of the account believed that the "original people" were the Mound Builders and that the Lenape overthrew them and destroyed their culture. David Oestreicher later asserted that Rafinesque's account was a hoax. He argued that the Walam Olum glyphs were derived from Chinese, Egyptian, and Mayan alphabets. Meanwhile, the belief that the Native Americans destroyed the mound-builder culture had gained widespread acceptance.

== See also ==
- List of burial mounds in the United States
- Petroform
- Prehistory of Ohio
- Southeastern Ceremonial Complex
- Tumulus, mounds (or barrows) of Europe and Asia
- Tumulus culture
- Mormon publications:
  - Heartland model - an interpretation of the Book of Mormon that the Mound Builders were among those peoples described.
  - Zelph (Archaeology and the Book of Mormon)
