= Spanish Fort Site (Holly Bluff, Mississippi) =

Archaeological site

- Spanish Fort Site (22SH500)
- U.S. National Register of Historic Places
- Location within Mississippi Location within the United States
- Location: Spanish Fort Rd., south of Holly Bluff, Mississippi
- Coordinates: 32°45′17″N 90°30′30″W
- Area: 18 acres (7.3 ha)
- NRHP reference No.: 88000234
- Added to NRHP: April 6, 1988

The Spanish Fort Site (22-SH-500) is an archaeological site in the Delta region of the U.S. state of Mississippi. It is one of three major earthwork sites in the far southern portion of the Yazoo River valley, and it has been designated a historic site because of its archaeological value. Despite its name, the site was not built by the Spanish, and its original purpose is believed to have been ceremonial, not martial.

== Location and excavations ==
The Spanish Fort Site lies along the Sunflower River nearly 10 miles (16 km) downstream from the community of Holly Bluff. Along with the nearby Leist A and Little Spanish Fort sites, it is a semicircular earthwork that has received little archaeological attention. In 1988, the site was classified as having been built by peoples of the Anderson Landing phase, but this assignment was largely due to the presence of an Anderson Landing site near the earthworks. The site first appeared in print in the early twentieth century in the account of archaeologist Clarence Bloomfield Moore, who sank a few test pits at the site; according to his report, the site comprised an embankment and a group of mounds. Eighteen years later, another survey estimated the enclosure's area at 45 acres (18 ha). From 1949 to 1955, yet another expedition collected artifacts from the surface and conducted more test excavations; they found evidence of occupation by the Marksville (Issaquena phase), Coles Creek (Aden phase), and Baytown (Deasonville phase) cultures.

== Conclusions ==
Excavations at Little Spanish Fort led an archaeologist working with the Forest Service to conclude in 1993 that the three sites could not be assigned a single conclusive date, due to the presence of cultural material as old as the Archaic period and as recent as the Mississippian period. However, the study suggested that the enclosure itself was constructed during the early portion of the Middle Woodland period; the site has yielded pottery with characteristics that appear to have been created as local peoples' culture was changing from Tchefuncte to Marksville. Radiocarbon dating shows that the Little Spanish Fort, which also was built during the Marksville period, was constructed approximately 2110 BP (160 BC) — despite their names, the earthwork sites were built long before the first Spanish presence in the region. Archaeologists have disputed the reasons for building the Spanish Fort and the other nearby earthworks: some hold that their circular or semicircular shape represented a method for humans to contain the vast cosmos, while others argue that the process of construction was their builders' method of joining in the cosmos. Scholars are agreed that the Spanish Fort Site and similar sites were ceremonial locations, rather than fortifications.

== Preservation ==
In 1988, about 18 acres (7.3 ha) of the Spanish Fort Site were listed on the National Register of Historic Places, due to the site's archaeological significance. Spanish Fort is one of five Sharkey County sites on the National Register, along with Leist A, the Rolling Fork Mounds, the Savory Site, and the Cary Site. The Little Spanish Fort is not listed on the National Register.
