= Caleb Goldsmith Forshey =

American engineer and amateur naturalist

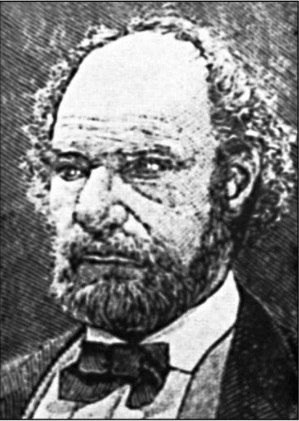
- Born: 18 July 1812; Somerset County, Pennsylvania
- Died: July 25, 1881 (aged 69); Carrollton District, Louisiana
- Education: Kenyon College, U.S. Military Academy at West Point
- Scientific career
- Fields: Hydraulic engineering, Biology
- Workplaces: Texas Military Institute (Austin), Jefferson College (Mississippi)

Caleb Goldsmith Forshey (July 18, 1812–July 25, 1881) was an American hydraulic engineer and polymath who worked in Mississippi, Louisiana, and Texas on projects related to river flood control and train bridge construction.

While employed in these efforts, he made several notable contributions as an amateur naturalist through his attempt to collect vascular plants and by his discoveries of several species of bivalve mollusks and gastropods, which were published at the Academy of Natural Sciences of Philadelphia. He also verified observations of African Americans regarding the unusual reptilia behavior of alligators swallowing their young for protection, correcting the earlier belief of William Bartram that old alligators "feed on the[ir] young as long as they can make prey of them"; the discovery of this protective behavior is sometimes mistakenly attributed to the explorer Edward McIlhenny in his book The Alligator's Life History (1935). These important anecdotal observations by Forshey were occasionally conveyed to the public through his friendships with Isaac Lea and Charles Lyell, as well as in his publications in standard scientific journals.

Forshey was additionally the first American surveyor to make detailed maps of the prehistoric archaeological sites of the Coles Creek culture (CE 700–1200) and Mississippian culture (CE 1200–1550) at Mott Archaeological Preserve and Jordan Mounds in modern-day Louisiana.

== Life and Engineering Career ==
Forshey was born on July 18, 1812 to John Sire Forshee (1774–1857) and Elizabeth Monroe Forshey (1778–1855) in Somerset County, Pennsylvania. From 1831 to 1833, he attended Kenyon College in Ohio and then, during the years 1833 to 1836, attended classes at the U.S. Military Academy at West Point in New York, although he did not graduate. He became a professor of mathematics and civil engineering at Jefferson College in Washington, Mississippi from 1836 to 1838, and was then employed in engineering projects along the Mississippi River. From 1840 to 1848, he lived in Vidalia, Louisiana while serving as the city engineer of Natchez, Mississippi, across the river from Vidalia. In 1848, he assisted in the construction of a hydrologic station at Carrollton, Louisiana to measure the flow of the river for the years 1848 to 1855, in accordance with the federal government's Mississippi Delta Survey. It was during this time that he became involved in a dispute with the Chief Engineer of the U.S. Army, Andrew A. Humphreys, over the proper method of flood control, specifically, either levees or flood control channels. He also contested with Humphreys his priority of discovery of the "double-float method," by which streamflow velocity is approximated.

When the Galveston, Houston & Henderson Railroad was granted its charter in 1853, Forshey moved to Texas to become chief engineer. On November 16, 1853 at Virginia Point on Galveston Bay, he officiated at the railroad's ground-breaking ceremonies. Under his leadership, the construction of the line was planned, and Forshey himself is credited with the design of the original West Bay Bridge, built in 1859. On February 1, 1860, it carried the first train from Virginia Point on the mainland across to Galveston. During these years, in 1854, he also founded the Texas Military Institute in Galveston, although the school was later moved to Rutersville, Fayette County, where it was consolidated with Rutersville College and the Texas Monumental Committee of La Grange. Until its closing in 1861 at the onset of the American Civil War, Forshey served as superintendent. Following the Civil War, he returned to Louisiana and continued to advocate for sustainable river flood control. In a letter of 1871, he asked:

"Does it not seem that this was a time for the government to step in and assume the protection of the area rescued from the dominion of the waters. Does not the labor in this conflict, the industrial soldier, whose ancestors for three or four generations have given their lives to this enterprise, deserve repose and laurels for himself and his posterity."

It has been estimated that during the 1870s, over 1.6 million tons of freight in ships moved through the Mississippi River annually. Louisiana was affected by the drainage of twenty-one states and five territories. To Forshey, the federal taxation on river and rail commerce should have been returned to Louisiana to benefit these river projects and to protect the alluvial lands.

== Contributions to Biology ==
Forshey is recognized as one of more than 1,250 noteworthy plant collectors represented in the botany collections (which exclude fossil collections) at the Academy of Natural Sciences of Philadelphia for his discovery of a vascular plant in Texas. However, he might be best known to naturalists through the various references Charles Lyell made to him in the first edition of the text A Second Visit to the United States (1849), Vol.II. This book's mentions to Forshey include their personal discussions of stream-flow velocities and river depths at various sites along the Mississippi, as well as an account of his interaction with an alligator several days before their meeting. Forshey seems to have appreciated these acknowledgements, and wrote of it years later himself in Hardwicke's Science-Gossip: An Illustrated Medium of Interchange and Gossip for Students and Lovers of Nature (1874).

"That alligators swallow their young I have had ocular demonstration in single case; and have the universal tradition of negroes and whites in this region of Louisiana, Mississippi, and Texas, that such is their habit. In the winter of 1843-4, I was engaged making a survey on the banks of the Homochitto Lake, near the Mississippi river, S.W. front of that State. The day was warm and sunny, and as I halted near the margin of a pond nearly dried up, to pick up some shells, I startled a litter of young alligators, that scampered off, yelping like puppies; and retreating some twenty yards, to the bank of the Lake Homochitto; I saw them reach their refuge in the mouth of a five-foot alligator. She evidently held open her mouth to receive them, as, in single file, they passed in beyond my observation. The dam then turned slowly round and slid down beneath the water, passing into a large opening in the bank, beneath the root of an ash-tree. The water was rendered turbid here and nowhere else, enabling me to find the mouth of what was, probably, the place of hybernation. I made a communication of these facts to Sir Charles Lyell, who visited me shortly afterwards. Some notice was made of it, and I think the statement will be found in the volume of his Second Visit to the United States."

After this early recognition by Lyell, Forshey would go on to make other notable contributions to biology through his classifications of a number of species of bivalve mollusks and gastropods, conveyed to conchologist and geologist Isaac Lea of Philadelphia in the late 1850s and 1860s. Entries at the MolluscaBase Project and the Biodiversity Heritage Library reference Forshey for classifications of the following species Unio macrodon, Unio rutersvillensis, Unio forsheyi, Unio riddellii, Unio chunii, Unio bealei, Unio speciosus, Unio lincecumii, Succinea forsheyi, and Physa forsheyi.

Some of Forshey's struggles to gain due recognition for such devoted work as an amateur specimen collector might be best characterized through his letter to the Boston ornithologist Thomas Mayo Brewer on October 27, 1857, wherein he wrote:

"You can have little idea how impossible it is in our remote frontier surrounded tho' we are by a thousand things of novelty & deep interest, to get any sort of information as to what we are doing. Except my private library I know of no books relating to natural science & it contains but a few incidentally there, as I am only an amateur naturalist."

== Death and Legacy ==
On July 25, 1881, following a series of heart attacks, Forshey died in Carrollton, Orleans Parish, Louisiana. The Weekly Picayune announced his funeral for July 30, with services at the Carondelet Street Methodist Church presided by Bishop Keener, who had officiated his marriage forty years earlier.

His publications appeared in the Proceedings of the Boston Society of Natural History, the New Orleans Commercial Appeal and Commercial Times, DeBow's Review, Transactions of the American Philosophical Society, Silliman's Journal, Bulletin of the Washington Philosophical Society, Smithsonian Miscellaneous Collections, Proceedings of the American Association for the Advancement of Science, Transactions of the American Society of Civil Engineers, the Proceedings of the Academy of Natural Sciences of Philadelphia, and elsewhere.
