= Venable Mound =

Archaeological site in Louisiana, US

- Location within Louisiana today
- 32°54′3.9″N 91°46′29.4″W
- Cultures: Troyville culture, Coles Creek culture, Plaquemine culture
- Location: Bonita, Louisiana, Morehouse Parish, Louisiana, US
- Region: Morehouse Parish, Louisiana

Site notes
- Archaeologists: Benjamin Brodnax, Clarence Bloomfield Moore

Venable Mound (the last remaining mound of the McTheney Mounds site) is an archaeological site in Morehouse Parish, Louisiana with a single mound with components from the Troyville, Coles Creek and Plaquemine period.

== Description ==
The site formerly had three mounds and was a group known as the McTheney Mounds site. It is situated on a natural levee on the east bank of Bayou Bartholomew. The site has been under cultivation since about the 1850s. In the 1870s Benjamin Brodnax of the Smithsonian Institution visited the site when it still had three of its mounds. By the time Clarence Bloomfield Moore came in 1908 it only had two. The one remaining platform mound is approximately 22 feet (6.7 m) in height, with a base 140 feet (43 m) by 140 feet (43 m) square and a summit platform measuring 50 feet (15 m) square. Excavations have shown that the site was first occupied from 400 and 700 CE during the Troyville period. Construction of the mound is dated to 700 to 1200 CE during the Coles Creek period. Analysis of ceramics from the site date have been dated other occupations of the site to 1200 to 1541 during the Plaquemine/Mississippian period. Venable Mound is named after Charles Venable.

== See also ==
- Jordan Mounds: also in Morehouse Parish
- Culture, phase, and chronological table for the Mississippi Valley
