= Filhiol Mound Site =

- Location within Louisiana today
- 32°20′22.38″N 92°5′35.32″W
- Cultures: Coles Creek culture
- Location: Monroe, Louisiana, Ouachita Parish, Louisiana, United States
- Region: Ouachita Parish, Louisiana

History
- Built: 700 CE
- Abandoned: 1200

Filhiol Mound Site is an archaeological site of the Coles Creek culture in Ouachita Parish, Louisiana on a natural levee of the Ouachita River.

== Description ==
The site consists of a platform mound which now measures 7 feet (2.1 m) in height, with the base being 100 feet (30 m) by 100 feet (30 m). Excavations at the site have produced charcoal from beneath the mound which dates to 700–1200 CE. A cemetery established in the 1850s on the mounds summit has helped preserve it.

== Location ==
The site is located on US 165 11.7 miles (18.8 km) south of its junction with on Interstate 20.

== See also ==
- Culture, phase, and chronological table for the Mississippi Valley
