= Greenhouse site =

Archeological site

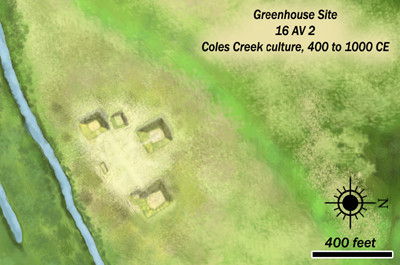
- Layout of the site

- Location within Louisiana today
- 31°8′22.31″N 92°2′25.73″W
- Cultures: Troyville culture, Coles Creek culture
- Location: Marksville, Louisiana, Avoyelles Parish, Louisiana, USA
- Region: Avoyelles Parish, Louisiana

History
- Built: 400 CE
- Abandoned: 1000

Site notes
- Excavation dates: 1938
- Archaeologists: James A. Ford,

The Greenhouse site (16 AV 2) is an archaeological site of the Troyville-Coles Creek culture (400 to 1000 CE) in Avoyelles Parish, Louisiana.

Greenhouse is the most extensively excavated Troyville-Coles Creek site in Louisiana. The site consists of seven platform mounds surrounding a central plaza that measures 200 feet (61 m) by 350 feet (110 m). Archaeologists have not found an associated village for the site, which supports the theory that the site was ceremonial in nature and that its builders lived elsewhere. Mound A (12 feet (3.7 m) in height, with a base 120 feet (37 m) square and a summit 80 feet (24 m) square), Mound E (10 feet (3.0 m) in height, with a base 120 feet (37 m) square and a summit 80 feet (24 m) square) and Mound G are the 3 largest mounds at the site and form a triangle.

== See also ==
- Culture, phase, and chronological table for the Mississippi Valley
