= Feltus =

Feltus may refer to:

== People with the surname ==
- Barbara Becker (born Barbara Feltus, 1966), German-American designer, actress and model
- Brig Feltus, musician who co-founded Captive Libertine Recordings with Chico Bennett
- Catherine Craig (born Catherine Jewel Feltus, 1915–2004), American actress
- Frank Alex Feltus, American computational biologist
- Gerald Feltus, a former detective in the Tamam Shud case, Australia
- Henry James Feltus (1775–1828), Irish-American Episcopal minister and first librarian of the General Theological Seminary, New York
- Judy Feltus, engineer on Empire Burlesque
- Martha Feltus, American politician from Vermont
- Pamela Feltus, author of books on the Condor Legion and Flying Tigers
- Peter Feltus (1942–2012), American philatelist

== People with the given name ==
- Feltus Taylor (1962–2000), American executed criminal

== See also ==
- Feltus Mound Site
