= Scott Place Mounds =

Archaeological site in Louisiana

- Location within Louisiana today
- 32°46′27.2″N 92°26′39″W
- Cultures: Coles Creek culture, Plaquemine culture
- Location: Farmerville, Louisiana, Union Parish, Louisiana, USA
- Region: Union Parish, Louisiana

Scott Place Mounds is an archaeological site in Union Parish, Louisiana from the Late Coles Creek-Early Plaquemine period, dating to approximately 1200 CE. The site is one of the few such sites in north-central Louisiana.

== Description ==
The site is a five-mound complex located near the confluence of Corney Bayou and Lake D’Arbonne. Mound A is the largest mound at 11 feet (3.4 m) in height with a square base measuring 125 feet (38 m) by 125 feet (38 m) and its summit 70 feet (21 m) by 45 feet (14 m). Mound B is the second largest at 6 feet (1.8 m) in height and 65 feet (20 m) in diameter and is located 270 feet (82 m) to the northeast of Mound A. The three remaining mounds (Mounds C, D and E) are approximately 2 feet (0.61 m) in height and range from 65 feet (20 m) to 25 feet (7.6 m) in diameter. All of the mounds were built in single stages. Charcoal samples taken from underneath Mound B have been dated to approximately 1200 CE.

== See also ==
- Culture, phase, and chronological table for the Mississippi Valley
