= Wade Landing Mound =

Archaeological site in Louisiana, United States

- Location within Louisiana today
- 32°4′32.3″N 92°1′11.5″W
- Cultures: Coles Creek culture
- Location: Columbia, Louisiana, Caldwell Parish, Louisiana, US
- Region: Caldwell Parish, Louisiana

History
- Built: 700 CE
- Abandoned: 1200

Wade Landing Mound is an archaeological site of the Coles Creek culture (700 to 1200 CE) in Caldwell Parish, Louisiana.

== Description ==
The site contains a 9 feet (2.7 m) tall rectangular platform mound with a base measuring 130 feet (40 m) by 165 feet (50 m). Archaeologists have done core samples of the mound and determined that it was built in two stages. Combined with the core samples, ceramic analysis of artifacts found at the site have dated it to approximately 700–1200 CE. The mound has a historic period cemetery on its summit, which has prevented looting.

== Location ==
The site is located on LA 559 13.4 miles (21.6 km) north of the Duty/Enterprise Ferry crossing.

== See also ==
- Culture, phase, and chronological table for the Mississippi Valley
