= Sundown Mounds =

- Location within Louisiana today
- 31°56′4.85″N 91°25′9.48″W
- Cultures: Coles Creek culture
- Location: Mayflower, Louisiana, Tensas Parish, Louisiana, USA
- Region: Tensas Parish, Louisiana

History
- Built: 700 CE
- Abandoned: 1200 CE

Sundown Mounds is a multimound archaeological site in Tensas Parish, Louisiana from the Early Coles Creek culture. It is the type site for the Sundown Phase (600-800 CE) of the Tensas Basin and Natchez Bluff Coles Creek chronology.

== Description ==
The site is located on the western bank of Little Choctaw Bayou and has three platform mounds that form a triangle surrounding a plaza, a typical Coles Creek arrangement. Mound A, the largest mound, is an 11 feet (3.4 m) in height and its base measures 190 feet (58 m) by 180 feet (55 m) and a summit measuring 60 feet (18 m) by 60 feet (18 m). Mound B, the second largest, is located 400 feet (120 m) to the northwest of Mound A. It is 8 feet (2.4 m) in height with base measurements of 130 feet (40 m) by 100 feet (30 m) and its summit 65 feet (20 m) by 33 feet (10 m). Mound C is 7 feet (2.1 m) with base measurements of 100 feet (30 m) by 80 feet (24 m) with a dome-shaped summit. Mounds A and B had ramps from their summits down to the plaza. The mounds were constructed sometime between 750 and 800 CE, but the site was occupied during most of the Coles Creek period from 700 to 1200.

== See also ==
- Culture, phase, and chronological table for the Mississippi Valley
- Balmoral Mounds
- Flowery Mound
- Ghost Site Mounds
- Routh Mounds
