= Raffman site =

Archaeological site in Louisiana, U.S.

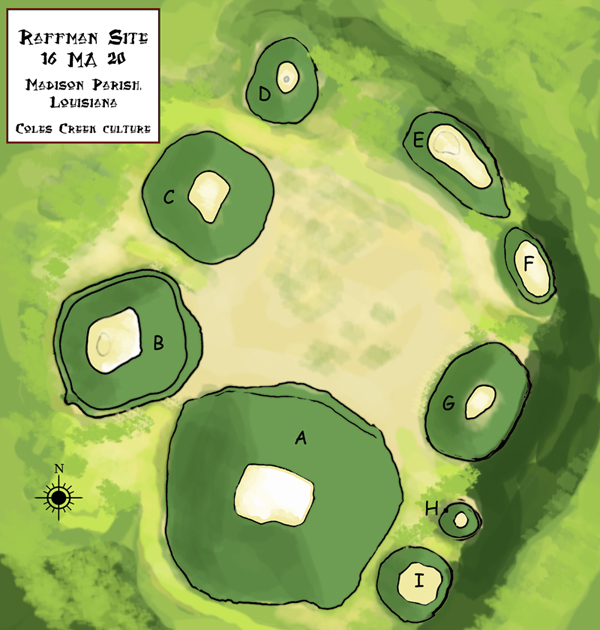
- Diagram showing the arrangement of plaza and platform mounds at site

- Location within Louisiana today
- 32°28′23.92″N 91°20′46.97″W
- Periods: Balmoral Phase
- Cultures: Tchefuncte culture, Coles Creek culture
- Location: Waverly, Louisiana, Madison Parish, Louisiana, USA
- Region: Madison Parish, Louisiana

History
- Built: 500 BCE
- Abandoned: 1200 CE

Site notes
- Excavation dates: 1981, 1998, 2000, 2002, 2004
- Archaeologists: Tristram R. Kidder, Lori Roe

The Raffman site ( 16 MA 20 ) is an archaeological site located in Madison Parish, Louisiana and constructed between 700 and 1200 CE. It has components from the Tchefuncte culture and the Coles Creek culture, whose main period of occupation was during the Balmoral phase (1000-1100 CE) of the Tensas Basin and Natchez Bluffs chronology and which was virtually deserted by the end of the Preston phase (1100–1200 CE).

== Description ==
The site is quite large with nine platform mounds arranged around a central plaza. The plaza is 90 metres (300 ft) by 100 metres (330 ft), with Mounds A, B, C, D, E, and G closely crowded around it. Mounds H and I are located adjacent to Mound A just to the southeast of the plaza. Located on the southern boundary of the plaza is Mound A, the largest at the site. It is 12 metres (39 ft) in height and 75 metres (246 ft) by 100 metres (330 ft) at its base.

=== Chronology ===
Testing of the site revealed Early Woodland period deposits from the Tchefuncte period (600 BCE to 200 CE) underlying the Coles Creek period mounds (700 to 1200 CE). After the Early Woodland phase the site was the site of Middle and early Late Woodland occupations. Sometime after 700 CE the inhabitants of the site began erecting large flat and conical mounds. By 1000 CE during the Coles Creek period a massive construction effort succeeded in restructuring the plaza and further mounds were added to the group. About 1200 CE the site was almost entirely abandoned.

=== Excavations ===
Raffman is first mentioned as an archaeological site in 1954 by noted archaeologists Philip Phillips and Robert Neitzel. Except for some mapping and shovel tests in 1981 by Williams, Belmont and Kardish, investigations over the fifty years were sparse. Beginning in the late 1990s the site was excavated over multiple seasons by archaeologist Tristam R. Kidder in 1998 and 2000 and then by Lori Roe and Kidder in 2002 and 2004.

== See also ==
- Francis Thompson Site (16 MA 112): also in Madison Parish
- Culture, phase, and chronological table for the Mississippi Valley
