= Holly Bluff site =

Archaeological site in Yazoo County, Mississippi, United States

Holly Bluff Site
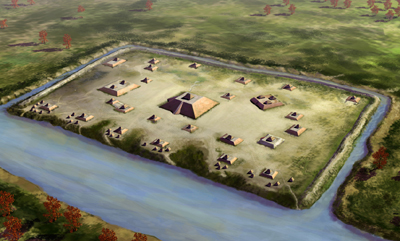
- An illustration of what the Holly Bluff Site may have looked like. Artist Herb Roe

- Location within Mississippi
- 32°48′50.77″N 90°40′58.62″W
- Periods: Plaquemine Mississippian
- Cultures: Plaquemine culture
- Location: Holly Bluff, Mississippi, Yazoo County, Mississippi, US
- Region: Yazoo County, Mississippi

History
- Built: 800
- Abandoned: 1500

Site notes
- Architectural style: platform mound
- Excavation dates: 1908, 1928, 1936, 1949, 1958-1960
- Archaeologists: Clarence Bloomfield Moore, Philip Phillips, James A. Ford, Paul Gebhard, Nick Zeigler in
- Holly Bluff Site
- U.S. National Register of Historic Places
- U.S. National Historic Landmark
- NRHP reference No.: 66000412

Significant dates
- Added to NRHP: October 15, 1966
- Designated NHL: July 19, 1964

The Holly Bluff Site (22 YZ 557), sometimes known as the Lake George Site, and locally as "The Mound Place," is an archaeological site that is a type site for the Lake George phase of the prehistoric Plaquemine culture period of the area. The site is on the southern margin of the Mississippian cultural advance down the Mississippi River and on the northern edge of that of the Cole's Creek and Plaquemine cultures of the South." The site was first excavated by Clarence Bloomfield Moore in 1908 and tested by Philip Phillips, Paul Gebhard and Nick Zeigler in 1949.

It was declared a National Historic Landmark in 1964. The mounds are listed on the Mississippi Mound Trail.

== Location ==
The Holly Bluff Site is a large archaeological site located on the south bank of George Lake (Lake George), approximately 0.5 miles (0.8 km) east of its confluence with the Sunflower River and 1.5 miles (2.4 km) southeast of the village of Holly Bluff in Yazoo County, Mississippi. The site is bisected by a county road and is currently used as the headquarters of a plantation.

== Prehistoric timeline ==
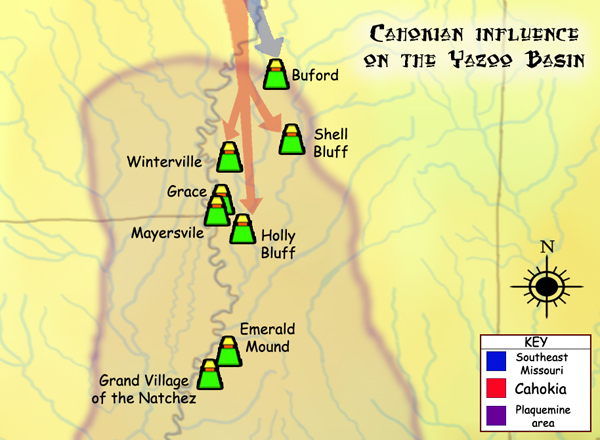
Early Mississippian influence on the Yazoo Basin area

The site's occupation begins with a Jaketown Phase occupation evidenced by a scattering of Poverty Point objects in the lowest levels of excavations. This is followed, after a hiatus evidenced by a complete lack of Tuscola Phase materials, by an early Marksville period component tentatively assigned an early Anderson Landing Phase that may have lasted into an early Issaquena times. The succeeding late 'Issaquena Phase and Deasonville Phases are virtually unrepresented at Holly Bluff. The site was again occupied from the lower half of the Baytown period up to the late prehistoric times. All phases of the local sequence from the Bayland on through the Lake George Phase (1350–1500) (of which the site is the type site for the Lower Yazoo Basin Plaquemine chronology) are abundantly documented. Materials of the Crippen Point Phase of the Late Coles Creek appear to be most widely spread, and it may have been at this time that the settlement attained its greatest size. In the final Lake George Phase additions were made to some of the mounds, especially Mound A, and the enclosing embankment was built, but the total area occupied was perhaps not as large as in the preceding period.

== Site description ==
Mound A was at a near center of the site, an unusual location for mounds in ceremonial centers of the Coles Creek and Mississippi periods. In the case of centers the plaza is normally the central feature with the principal "temple mound" located on one side, usually but not always the west, its principal ramp giving access from the plaza on the east side of the mound. In the case of Holly Bluff there seems to have been two plazas to the east and west of the Mound A respectively.

Sampling evidence supports the theory that Mound A was originally part of a group (including mounds B, C, D, E, and F) surrounding the western plaza possibly as early as the Bayland phase (but more likely the Aden phase), and certainly established by the Kings Crossing phase. Mound A may or may not have been the principal structure at this time. This plan may have carried on into the Crippen Point phase, but the evidence strongly suggests that either then or in the succeeding Mayersville phase site reorientation took place. Mound A became the principal feature of an east plaza assemblage (with mounds F', G, G', H, U, and V) which remained the ritual center of the site throughout the remainder of its history.

The twenty-five mounds that are now recognized range from barely noticeable rises to the massive Mound A, which is 55 feet (17 m) high and covers nearly two acres. It is believed that the lower rises were used as house substructures and repeatedly reconstructed. The larger mounds were most likely used for ceremonial purposes rather than residential. Until recent erosion, earthen ramps could be seen climbing to the summits of these large mounds. Seven of the mounds are situated along the bank of George Lake and six more are located within the embankment. The remaining twelve mounds are positioned around the two plazas situated to the east and west of Mound A. This design is unusual and extremely large for the area; the closest in size and layout is the Winterville site.

The final major feature of the site is the earthen wall and the trench that surrounds it on three sides. In the earliest survey of the site, C. B. Moore reported that the wall was four to 6 feet (1.8 m) high and still reached this height although large sections have now been destroyed. It is likely that the ditch, which was filled with water from George Lake, supplied the dirt for the wall. The one side that was not protected by the wall was the lake side of the site, the lake bank creating a steep enough boundary on this northern side to provide protection.

The environment of the Lake George site was favorable for occupation with its rich soils supporting an array of bio-diversity. The natural levees created by deposits from the Mississippi were made of rich sandy and silty loams which allowed the common Southeastern deciduous hardwoods, such as hickory, elm, ash, cottonwood, maple, pecan, hackberry, honey locust, sycamore, and even gums and oaks, to flourish. The swamps surrounding the site supported an entirely different ecosystem including alligators, small reptiles and aquatic plants. The streams and rivers also provided fish, shellfish, and other aquatic fauna, which can be seen from excavations of shell middens and deposits of the site. These waterways also provided a major form of communication. This abundant region was obviously utilized by many different peoples over the course of prehistory as Holly Bluff shows.

== Excavations ==
Looting, erosion and cultivation have extensively damaged the Holly Bluff Site over the years. This has caused some debate over the form and degree of some of the earthworks. Clarence B. Moore noted in 1908, following a visit, that some thirty rises and mounds, small and large, could be counted within the enclosure. Nine years later Calvin S. Brown visited and counted only twenty-five or so mounds within the wall. In 1928 and again in 1936 James A. Ford recorded only twenty-two mounds. In a site report in January 1941, Jesse D. Jennings described twenty-seven mounds and some questionable rises. C. B. Moore's original estimate is believed to most accurately reflect the situation; many of the smaller earthworks have been lost to recent and intense cultivation.

In January and February 1908, Clarence Bloomfield Moore received permission from the then owner Judge William Andrew Henry of Yazoo City to excavate the sites along the Yazoo River and its tributary the Sunflower River in his steamboat, The Gopher. It was recorded that eleven sites were fully excavated and eight were partially. Holly bluff was one of the 19 sites excavated. Moore commented on the physical appearance of the site: "Strewn over the enclosed area, among the mounds and on them…are chert pebbles; fragments of chert; bits of mussel shell; and small parts of earthenware vessels" Most of the earthenware was undecorated, he recorded, and mostly shell-tempered with some stone tempering which is common in the Yazoo-Sunflower region. C. B. Moore's excavations produced various small artifacts including projectile points, a pebble axe of fossilized wood, a chert hammerstone, and a zoomorphic effigy pipe of shell-tempered pottery. He was disappointed, however, in finding nothing of great importance other than two disturbed burials in a mound on the lake front. Moore's disappointment was evident in his failing to map the site and his statement, "it having become evident to us that our search was inadequately rewarded".

Numerous other archaeologists with varying degrees of success followed up Moore's excavations. Each of the later excavations found an extremely different system of mounds. In the 1920s the site was damaged by the then-plantation owner Mr. Charles W. Perry who pastured cattle on the large mounds and cultivated the smaller mounds. The cattle foraged the cover of the larger mounds and their trampling eroded much of the site, erasing the ramps described by Moore. In 1949 Philip Phillips, Paul Gebhard and Nick Zeigler began performing test excavations of the Holly Bluff Site. These were the first truly scientific excavations carried out at the site. The interpretations of the data provided the first reliable conclusions of the culture history. These tests finally provided evidence that Holly Bluff had been occupied for approximately one millennium. The site was an important phase of the Coles Creek culture. From 1958 to 1960, "hundreds of skeletons were removed" from Mound C.

== See also ==
- Culture, phase, and chronological table for the Mississippi Valley
- Southeastern Ceremonial Complex
- List of Mississippian sites
- List of burial mounds in the United States
