= Marsden Mounds =

Archaeological site in Louisiana, US

- Location within Louisiana today
- 32°29′10.9″N 91°29′30″W
- Cultures: Poverty Point culture, Troyville-Coles Creek culture
- Location: Delhi, Louisiana
- Region: Richland Parish, Louisiana

History
- Built: 1500 BCE
- Abandoned: 1200 CE

Site notes
- Architectural styles: platform mounds, embankment, plaza
- Marsden (16RI3)
- U.S. National Register of Historic Places
- Location within Louisiana Location within the United States
- Nearest city: Delhi, Louisiana
- NRHP reference No.: 04000803
- Added to NRHP: August 4, 2004

Marsden Mounds (16 RI 3) is an archaeological site with components from the Poverty Point culture (1500 BCE) and the Troyville-Coles Creek period (400 to 1200 CE). It is located in Richland Parish, Louisiana, near Delhi. It was added to the NRHP on August 4, 2004, as NRIS number 04000803. It is the type site for the Marsden Phase (500-600 CE) of the Tensas Basin and Natchez Bluff regions local chronology.

== Site description ==
The earthworks at the site include a group of five platform mounds and two portions of an earthen embankment. Mounds A, B, C and D (which are between 3 feet (0.91 m) and 5 feet (1.5 m) in height) are located along the eastern edge of Maçon Ridge with a section of the embankment connecting three of them. The largest mound at the site, Mound E, measures 13 feet (4.0 m) in height, with the base being 150 feet (46 m) by 150 feet (46 m) and a summit of 130 feet (40 m) by 130 feet (40 m). It and another portion of embankment are located across a large plaza 300 feet (91 m) to the southwest of the other mounds.

During investigations at the site, artifacts from the Poverty Point culture were found under some of the mounds, showing that people occupied this at least as early as 1500 BC during the Archaic period. Radiocarbon dating of charcoal samples from one of the smaller mounds have been dated 400 and 1200 CE, during the Late Woodland Troyville-Coles Creek period.

The site is part of the Poverty Point Reservoir State Park. It is open to the public and accessible by foot.

== See also ==
- Culture, phase, and chronological table for the Mississippi Valley
- Poverty Point
- Watson Brake
