= Crippen Point site =

Pre-Columbian archaeological site in Mississippi, United States

Crippen Point Site
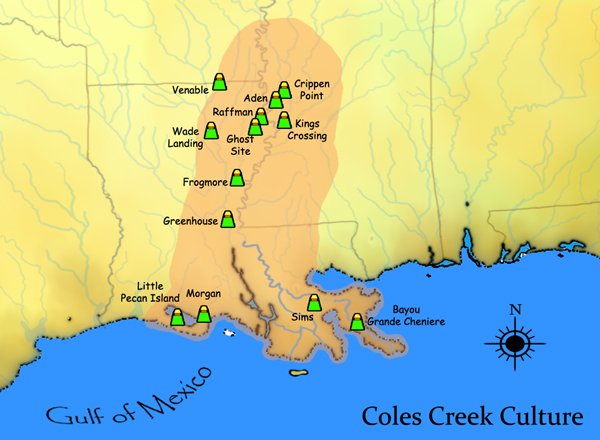
- A map showing the extent of the Coles Creek cultural period, including the Crippen Point site

- Location within Mississippi today
- 32°48′53.47″N 90°41′45.35″W
- Cultures: Coles Creek culture
- Location: Holly Bluff, Mississippi, Sharkey County, Mississippi, USA
- Region: Sharkey County, Mississippi

History
- Built: 1050 CE
- Abandoned: 1200

The Crippen Point site is a Coles Creek culture archaeological site located in Sharkey County, Mississippi, United States.

== Description ==
The Crippen Point site is the type site of the Crippen Point phase (c. 1050–1200 CE), a regional phase of the late Coles Creek culture in the Lower Mississippi Valley. Archaeologists use the phase to describe a period of increasing social and political complexity among Coles Creek societies prior to the emergence of the Plaquemine culture. Sites assigned to the Crippen Point phase have been identified throughout the Lower Mississippi Valley, including portions of present-day Arkansas, Louisiana, and Mississippi. The phase was followed by the Plaquemine cultural period.

== Chronology ==
The site is associated with the Crippen Point phase of the Lower Yazoo Basin chronology, dating from approximately 1050 to 1200 CE. The phase followed the Kings Crossing phase and preceded the Winterville phase, which marks the beginning of the Plaquemine cultural period in the region.

== See also ==
- Kings Crossing site
- Winterville site
- Woodland period
