= Francis Thompson Site (16 MA 112) =

- U.S. National Register of Historic Places
- Location: Address restricted
- Nearest city: Delhi, Louisiana
- Area: 17 acres (6.9 ha)
- NRHP reference No.: 91001464
- Added to NRHP: October 8, 1991

The Francis Thompson Site, denoted by Smithsonian trinomial 16 MA 112, is an archeological site in Madison Parish, Louisiana in the vicinity of Delhi in Richland Parish. It was listed on the National Register of Historic Places on October 8, 1991.

The site has yielded prehistoric pottery and other artifacts from several cultures.

== See also ==
- Raffman site: also in Madison Parish
- National Register of Historic Places listings in Madison Parish, Louisiana
