= William Pidgeon (archaeologist) =

American archaeologist

William Pidgeon (c. 1800 – c. 1880) was an American antiquarian and archaeologist most famous for his 1858 work, Traditions of Dee-Coo-Dah and Antiquarian Researches, a putative history about lost tribes of the Upper Mississippi and the mounds they left behind. This book was eventually revealed to be partly a hoax, and partly embellishment of actual research. Combining elaborate sketches and maps of mound groups in Wisconsin, Iowa, Illinois, and Minnesota, Pidgeon claimed to have discovered an elaborate network of coded earthen symbols used by an ancient race that predated Native Americans; one of the last survivors of this putative race, "Dee-Coo-Dah", was interviewed by Pidgeon. Eventually his work became popular in the late 19th century, when there were numerous myths about pre-Indian mound builders, and Pidgeon's book went through at least three printings, making him a fortune. The famed archaeologist Theodore H. Lewis later revealed that Pidgeon had fabricated most of his research, and distorted much of the rest of it, mapping mounds where none existed, and changing the arrangement of existing mound groups to suit his needs. Pidgeon appears to have died in obscurity in Calhoun County, Illinois ca. 1880.

== Selected publications ==
- Traditions of De-coo-dah (1858)

== See also ==
- Archaeology and racism
