= Feltus Mound Site =

- Location in Mississippi today
- 31°44′47.62″N 91°15′37.08″W
- Cultures: Coles Creek culture
- Location: Fayette, Mississippi, Jefferson County, Mississippi, United States
- Region: Jefferson County, Mississippi

History
- Built: 700 CE
- Abandoned: 1000 CE

Feltus Mound Site (22 JE 500), also known as the Ferguson Mounds or the Truly Mounds, is an archaeological site located in Jefferson County, Mississippi, nearly 24 kilometres (15 mi) north of Natchez. The location is an Early Coles Creek site (dated 700 to 1000 CE) with four platform mounds clustered around a central plaza, although one of the four mounds has been leveled.

== See also ==
- Emerald Mound
- Grand Village of the Natchez
