= Coles Creek culture =

Late Woodland archaeological culture in Lower Mississippi valley, United States

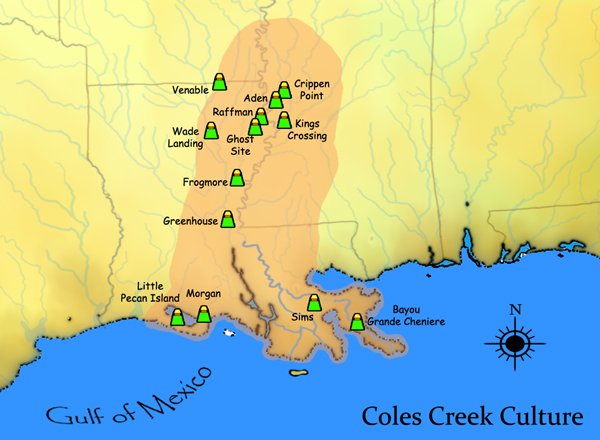
A map showing the extent of the Coles Creek cultural period and some important sites

Coles Creek culture is a Late Woodland archaeological culture in the Lower Mississippi valley in the Southeastern Woodlands. It followed the Troyville culture. The period marks a significant change in the cultural history of the area. Population increased dramatically and there is strong evidence of a growing cultural and political hierarchization, especially by the end of the Coles Creek sequence. Although many of the classic traits of chiefdom societies are not yet manifested, by 1000 CE the formation of simple elite polities had begun. Coles Creek sites are found in Arkansas, Louisiana, and Mississippi. It is considered ancestral to the Plaquemine culture.

== Features ==
The Coles Creek culture is an indigenous development of the Lower Mississippi Valley that took place between the terminal Woodland period and the later Plaquemine culture period. The period is marked by the increased use of flat-topped platform mounds arranged around central plazas, more complex political institutions, and a subsistence strategy still grounded in the Eastern Agricultural Complex and hunting rather than on the maize plant as would happen in the succeeding Plaquemine Mississippian period. The culture was originally defined by the unique decoration on grog-tempered ceramic ware by James A. Ford after his investigations at the Mazique Archeological Site. He had studied both the Mazique and Coles Creek Sites, and almost went with the Mazique culture, but decided on the less historically involved sites name. The Coles Creek area is further subdivided into Coles Creek proper in the northern part of its range throughout the interior Mississippi Valley, and Coastal Coles Creek, being found along the Gulf coast roughly south of the latitude of modern Baton Rouge, Louisiana.

=== Chronology ===
Culture	Lower Yazoo Basin Phases	Est. timeframe	Natchez Bluff Phases	Est. timeframe	Tensas Basin Phases	Est. timeframe	Barataria Bay Phases	Est. timeframe
Coles Creek	Crippen Point	1050–1200 CE	Gordon	1100–1200 CE	Preston	1100–1200 CE	St. Gabriel	1000–1200 CE
Coles Creek	Kings Crossing	900–1050 CE	Balmoral	1000–1100 CE	Balmoral	1000–1100 CE	St. Gabriel	1000–1200 CE
Coles Creek	Aden	800–900 CE	Ballina				Bayou Cutler	875 – 1000 CE
Coles Creek	Bayland	700 – 800 CE	Sundown				Bayou Ramos	700 – 875 CE

=== Architecture ===
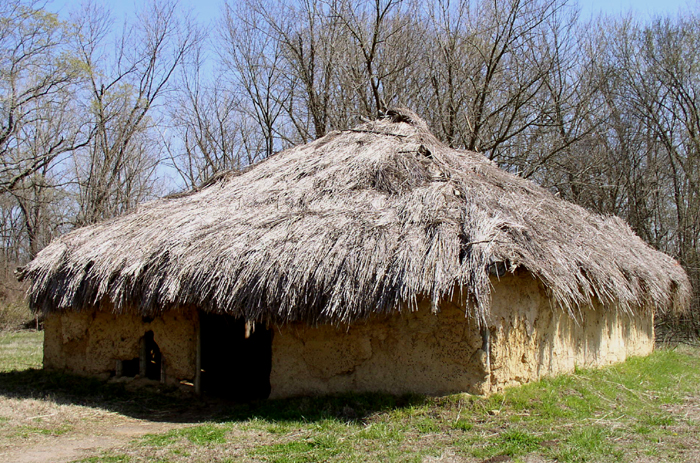
A wattle and daub house of the type used by Native Americans during the late prehistoric period

Although earlier cultures built mounds mainly as a part of mortuary customs, by the Coles Creek period these mounds took on a newer shape and function. Instead of being primarily for burial, mounds were constructed to support temples and other civic structures. Pyramidal mounds with flat tops and ramps were constructed, usually over successive years and with many layers. A temple or other structures, usually of wattle and daub construction, would be built on the summit of the mound.

A typical Coles Creek site plan consisted of at least two, and more commonly three, mounds around a central plaza. This pattern emerged in roughly 800 CE and continued for several hundred years. By late Coles Creek times, the site plans are often enlarged to include up to three more mounds. Sites typical of this period are Mount Nebo, Holly Bluff, Kings Crossing, and Lake Agnes.

Many Coles Creek mounds were erected over earlier mortuary mounds, leading researchers to speculate that emerging elites were symbolically and physically appropriating dead ancestors to emphasize and project their own authority.

=== Material culture ===
Long-distance trade seems to have been negligible at this time, as exotic goods and trade items are rare in Coles Creek sites. There is little evidence of domesticated or cultivated plants until the end of the Coles Creek period. Acorns are a dominant food source, supplemented with persimmons, palmetto, and some starchy seeds such as maygrass. Coles Creek populations may have loosely "managed" certain plant resources in order to promote a better or more consistent food supply. Maize is found in very limited quantities, but by 1000-1200 CE had begun to increase, although nowhere near the levels it would reach in later Mississippian culture times.

The bow and arrow was introduced in this period, although the atlatl continued to be used. Pottery styles changed during this period, as people began to create more durable wares with more diversified uses. Wet clay was tempered with particles of dry clay to prevent cracking during firing. Most pots were decorated only on the upper half, usually with designs of incised lines or impressed tool marks. Colors ranged from tan, black, brown and gray, although the rare red example is known. Also, the rare effigy pot is found.

== Known Coles Creek culture sites ==
Site	Image	Description
Aden site		Located in Issaquena County, Mississippi, it is the type site for the Aden Phase (800-900 CE) of the Lower Yazoo Basin Coles Creek chronology.
Balmoral Mounds		A group of three mounds located in Tensas Parish, Louisiana. Type site for the Balmoral Phase(1000-1100 CE) of the Tensas Basin and Natchez Bluffs Coles Creek chronology
Bayou Grande Cheniere Mounds	Bayou Grande Cheniere Mounds	A large group of twelve mounds located in Plaquemines Parish, Louisiana from the Coastal Coles Creek culture.
Crippen Point site		Type site for the Crippen Point Phase(1050-1200 CE) of the Lower Yazoo Basin Coles Creek chronology, located in Sharkey County, Mississippi.
Cypress Grove Mound		A well-preserved conical mound located in Concordia Parish, Louisiana dating from approximately 750 CE.
DePrato Mounds		A multimound complex located in Concordia Parish, Louisiana, radiocarbon and decorated pottery dated to about 600 CE during the Troyville/Coles Creek period.
Feltus Mound Site		A group of three mounds, dated to 700 to 1000 CE, clustered around a central plaza. Located north of Natchez.
Filhiol Mound Site		Located in Ouachita Parish, Louisiana on a natural levee of the Ouachita River
Flowery Mound		A single mound Late Coles Creek to Plaquemine/Mississippian site in Tensas Parish, Louisiana which dates from approximately 950–1541.
Frogmore Mound Site	Frogmore Mound Site	A Late Coles Creek site in Concordia Parish, Louisiana.
Ghost Site Mounds		A site in Tensas Parish, Louisiana with an Early to Middle Coles Creek component(700–1200)and a Late Coles Creek to Plaquemine component(1200 to 1541)
Greenhouse site	Greenhouse site	A multimound site in Avoyelles Parish, Louisiana from the Troyville-Coles Creek Period
Insley Mounds		A multimound site in Richland Parish, Louisiana with a Poverty Point period component (1700–1000 BCE) and a Coles Creek component (720 to 1200 CE).
Kings Crossing site	Kings Crossing site	The type site for the Kings Crossing phase (900 -1050 CE), a multimound site located near Vicksburg in Warren County, Mississippi
Lamarque Landing Mound		A single mound site in Concordia Parish, Louisiana dating to about 1000 CE.
Little Pecan Island Site		An archaeological site of the Coastal Coles Creek culture, dating to 800 to 1100 CE near Grand Chenier, Louisiana in Cameron Parish. Investigations by Robert Wauchope in 1946 produced a number of flexed burials and ceramic chronologies which helped determine the age and cultural affiliation of the site.
Marsden Mounds		A multimound site in West Carroll Parish, Louisiana near Delhi, Louisiana, with a Poverty Point period component (1500 BCE) and a Coles Creek component (400 to 1200 CE).
Mazique Archeological Site	Mazique	A multimound site in Adams County, Mississippi southeast of Natchez, Mississippi, with components from both the Coles Creek period (700-1000 CE) and the later Plaquemine Mississippian period (1000-1680 CE), when it was recorded in historic times as the White Apple village of the Natchez people.
Morgan Mounds		A multimound site of the Coastal Coles Creek culture, built and occupied from 700 to 1000 CE on Pecan Island in Vermilion Parish, Louisiana. Of the 45 recorded Coastal Coles Creek sites in the Petite Anse region, it is the only one with ceremonial substructure mounds and was possibly the center of a local chiefdom.
Mott Mounds	Mott Mounds	A large multimound site with components from the Late Marksville to the Plaquemine period but with its main occupation during the Coles Creek period, located in Franklin Parish, Louisiana.
Peck Mounds	Peck Mounds	A multimound site from the Late Troyville-Early Coles Creek period located in Catahoula Parish, Louisiana
Raffman site	Raffman site	A multimound site whose main period of occupation was during the Balmoral Phase(1000-1100 CE) of the Tensas Basin and Natchez Bluffs Coles Creek chronology, located in Madison Parish, Louisiana and constructed between 700 and 1000 CE
Scott Place Mounds		A multimound site from the Late Coles Creek-Early Plaquemine period located in Union Parish, Louisiana
Sims site		A multimound site located in Saint Charles Parish, Louisiana near the town of Paradis, Louisiana, first inhabited about 800 CE by peoples of the Coles Creek culture. By 1100 CE the culture of the site had transitioned into the Mississippianized Plaquemine culture that lasted until 1450 CE. A little later was a Late Mississippian/protohistic period that lasted from 1500 until about 1700 or 1800.
Spanish Fort		The site is a semicircular earthwork that lies along the Sunflower River nearly 10 miles (16 km) downstream from the community of Holly Bluff.
Sundown Mounds		A multimound site from the Early Coles Creek in Tensas Parish, Louisiana that is the type site for the Sundown Phase(700-800 CE)
Transylvania Mounds		A large multimound site with 2 plazas and components from the Coles Creek (700–1200) and Plaquemine/Mississippian periods (1200–1541). It located in East Carroll Parish, Louisiana It is the type site for the Transylvania Phase of the Tensas Basin Plaquemine Mississippian chronology.
Troyville Earthworks	Troyville Earthworks	A large multimound site with components dating from 100 BCE to 700 CE. It once had the tallest mound in Louisiana at 82 feet (25 m) in height. It is located in Catahoula Parish, Louisiana in the town of Jonesville.
Venable Mound		A single mound site with components from the Troyville, Coles Creek and Plaquemine periods, located in Morehouse Parish, Louisiana
Wade Landing Mound		A single mound site located in Caldwell Parish, Louisiana

== See also ==
- Plum Bayou culture
- Culture, phase, and chronological table for the Mississippi Valley
