= Maturin Le Petit =

Maturin Le Petit (1693–1739) was a Jesuit priest sent among the Choctaws in 1726 and to observe the Natchez in 1730 in an area of what became part of Mississippi. He was also in New Orleans. He wrote of the Natchez that, "The sun is the principal object of veneration to these people" and that "they cannot conceive of anything which can be above this heavenly body." The French were fascinated by accounts of the Natchez as they had been ruled by their own Sun King, Louis XIV (le Roi Soleil).
