= Aden site =

Archaeological site in Mississippi, US

Aden Site
- Location within Mississippi today
- 32°38′13″N 90°50′13″W
- Cultures: Coles Creek culture
- Location: Valley Park, Mississippi, Issaquena County, Mississippi, USA
- Region: Issaquena County, Mississippi

History
- Built: 800 CE
- Abandoned: 900 CE

Site notes
- Architectural styles: platform mounds, plaza
- Aden Site
- U.S. National Register of Historic Places
- Nearest city: Valley Park, Mississippi
- NRHP reference No.: 88002698
- Added to NRHP: December 14, 1988

The Aden Site is an archaeological site that is the type site for the Aden phase (800–900 CE) of Lower Yazoo Basin Coles Creek culture chronology. It corresponds to Middle Coles Creek, chronologically between the Bayland phase and Kings Crossing phase.

== Location ==
The Aden Site is located on the south bank of Jeff Davis Bayou, a mile and a half east of the unincorporated community of Valley Park, Issaquena County, Mississippi, U.S.A.

== Site description ==
The site consists of three platform mounds making a triangular arrangement surrounding a small plaza, with the fourth side of the plaza bordered by Jeff Davis Bayou. This is considered to be a typical Coles Creek phase settlement pattern. The largest, designated Mound A, on the eastern border of the plaza is 3 metres (9.8 ft) in height, with the summit surface area measuring 23 metres (75 ft) by 17 metres (56 ft). The second largest mound, Mound B on the southern border of the plaza, is 3.5 metres (11 ft) high, and measuring 50 metres (160 ft) by 35 metres (115 ft) at its base. Mound C, located on the western border of the plaza, is 2 metres (6.6 ft) high and 50 metres (160 ft) in diameter. Mound C has been heavily degraded by cultivation, and may have been larger.

The mounds are listed on the Mississippi Mound Trail.

== Aden phase ==
Aden phase (800–900 CE) is a classification of sites and artifacts of the Cole Creek Culture created by Phillip Phillips.

Aden phase sites are distributed throughout western Mississippi, in the area east of the Mississippi River and North of the Yazoo River except for the Blackely and Haynes Bluff sites which are along the Southern bank of the Yazoo River.

The original Cole Creek site had become better known as the Gordon site and was considered an example of the late Gordon period of the Plaquemine culture. Sites such as Greenhouse and French Fork showed evidence of multiple occupations over a long period resulting in pottery that from multiple cultures. The Aden phase was an attempt to create a new baseline for “classic” Cole Creek Culture which could be then be used as a reference when comparing it to other cultures.

Aden phase sites are distributed throughout western Mississippi, in the area east of the Mississippi River and North of the Yazoo River except for the Blackely and Haynes Bluff sites which are along the Southern bank of the Yazoo River.

== Aden artifacts ==
The Aden phase was originally represented by the pottery styles identified as Baytown Plain, var. Valley Park; Chevalier Stamped, var Chevalier; Coles Creek Incised, vars. Coles and Wade; Evansville Punctuated, var. Rhinehart; French Fork Incised, var. Larkin; Marzique Incised, var. Marzique; and Mulberry Creek Cord Marked, var. Smith Creek. The sites now considered the best examples of “typical” Aden phase are, in descending order of importance Coles Creek Incised, vars. Coles Creek, Campbellsville, and Macedonia, and French Fork Incised, var Larkin.

Pottery of the Aden phase tended towards simple designs; regular shapes, unmodified rims and few appendages. Their surfaces were typically light gray, clouded by firing and bits of white material embedded in the earthenware. Triangular, zig zag and crescents were also present as decoration.

== Settlements ==
Aden phase settlements were the first example of the rectangular shaped mounds that have become a hallmark of Cole Creek Culture settlements, though some sites have older conical mounds from the Bayland phase remained in sites that were continually inhabited since that time. In the Aden phase, settlements began to be built in a planned fashion with three rectangular mounds of approximately equal size forming a ceremonial center to the town with the three mounds forming three sides of a rectangular space.

== See also ==
- Culture, phase, and chronological table for the Mississippi Valley
