= Troyville culture =

Archaeological culture in areas of Louisiana and Arkansas, United States

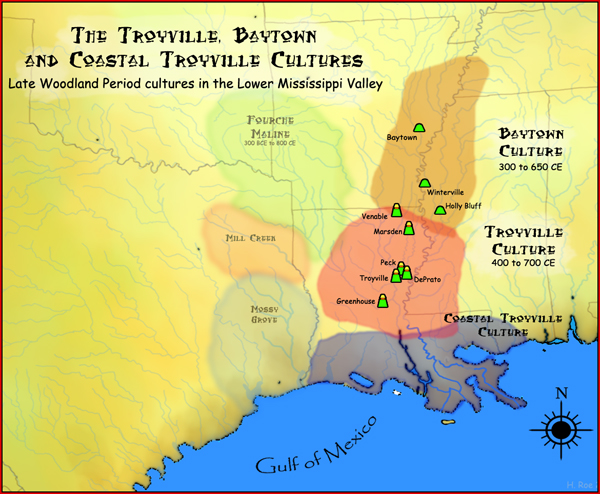
Map showing the geographic extent of the Baytown, Coastal Troyville and Troyville cultures

The Troyville culture is an archaeological culture in areas of Louisiana and Arkansas in the Lower Mississippi valley in the Southeastern Woodlands. It was a Baytown Period culture and lasted from 400 to 700 CE during the Late Woodland period. It was contemporaneous with the Coastal Troyville and Baytown cultures (all three had evolved from the Marksville Hopewellian peoples) and was succeeded by the Coles Creek culture. Where the Baytown peoples built dispersed settlements, the Troyville people instead continued building major earthwork centers.

== Subsistence ==
The Troyville-Coles Creek people lived on gathered wild plants and local domesticates, and maize was of only minor importance. Acorns, persimmons, palmetto, maygrass, and squash were all more important than maize. Tobacco was cultivated as well, and protein came from deer and smaller mammals, but the bounty of the region kept maize from being adopted as a staple until as late as the thirteenth century CE.

== Known Troyville culture sites ==
Site	Image	Description
DePrato Mounds	DePrato Mounds	A multimound complex located in Concordia Parish, Louisiana, radiocarbon and decorated pottery dated to about 600 CE during the Troyville/Coles Creek period.
Greenhouse site	Greenhouse site	A multimound site in Avoyelles Parish, Louisiana from the Troyville-Coles Creek Period
Marsden Mounds		A multimound site in Richland Parish, Louisiana near Delhi, Louisiana, with a Poverty Point period component (1500 BCE) and a Troyville-Coles Creek component (400 to 1200 CE).
Peck Mounds	Peck Mounds	A multimound site from the Late Troyville-Early Coles Creek period located in Catahoula Parish, Louisiana
Troyville Earthworks	Troyville Earthworks	A large multimound site with components dating from 100 BCE to 700 CE. It once had the tallest mound in Louisiana at 82 feet (25 m) in height. It is located in Catahoula Parish, Louisiana in the town of Jonesville. It is the type site for the culture.
Venable Mound		A single mound site with components from the Troyville, Coles Creek and Plaquemine periods, located in Morehouse Parish, Louisiana

== See also ==
- Culture, phase, and chronological table for the Mississippi Valley
