= Holly Bluff, Mississippi =

Unincorporated community in Mississippi, US

Holly Bluff is a small unincorporated community in Yazoo County, Mississippi.

Originally known as "Sharbrough's Landing" to river boat pilots the community was established by the Sharbrough family in 1877. Located on the Sunflower River, early delta cotton planters used the river to ship their cotton to Vicksburg and New Orleans.

== Geography ==
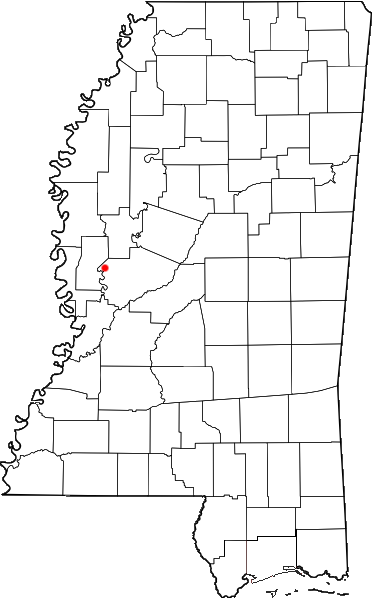
Location of Holly Bluff, Mississippi

Holly Bluff is located at 32°49′17″N 90°42′32″W (32.82139, -90.70889).

== The Sharbrough family ==
Following the Civil War, two brothers, Franklin Wilson and John Walter Sharbrough came to the area now known as Holly Bluff. Their father, Franklin Wilson Sharbrough, a cotton planter from Smith County, Mississippi had lost everything during the war.

The Sharbrough brothers first lived in the area around Green Hill Plantation on Silver Creek. They worked together buying and clearing land for farming. The older brother, Franklin Wilson Sharbrough purchased the land on the north side of the Sunflower River and established Valley Home Plantation. John Walter purchased the land on the southern or Sharkey County side of the Sunflower River and called his place Patmos Plantation. Together, they built the first roads, bridges, levees and cotton gin in this part of the Mississippi Delta. Later, they built the first church then called "Sharbrough's Chapel" which still operates today as Holly Bluff United Methodist Church.

In 1906, the railroad requested the Sharbrough family change the name of Sharbrough's Landing to Sharbroughville. However, the family thought Sharbroughville would be too hard to spell and settled on the name Holly Bluff. Holly Bluff post office was established July 31, 1906, with Marcia M. Hackler as first postmaster.

== The Yazoo Delta Railroad ==
The Yazoo & Mississippi Valley Railroad had been incorporated in 1882 by the Illinois Central to penetrate the fertile Yazoo Delta.

In 1905, a line of the Yazoo and Mississippi Valley Railroad, affectionately called the "Yellow Dog," was laid from Silver City, Mississippi to Holly Bluff.

The principal purpose of the Holly Bluff line was to gain access to the cotton grown by the Sharbrough family in this rich section of the Mississippi Delta. After the building of the railroad, most of the cotton from Holly Bluff was sold in Memphis rather than New Orleans.

== Archaeological site ==
Located just outside Holly Bluff on Mississippi Highway 16 is the Lake George Mound site. The mounds were built during the prehistoric Temple Mound period. The largest mound rises 55 feet and is the fourth tallest native American mound in the United States. The mounds were built for religious ceremonies and not habitation. The site is important in that it is on the southern margin of the Mississippian cultural advance down the Mississippi River and on the northern edge of that of the Cole's Creek and Plaquemine cultures of the South.

== Climate ==
The climate in this area is characterized by hot, humid summers and generally mild to cool winters. According to the Köppen Climate Classification system, Holly Bluff has a humid subtropical climate, abbreviated "Cfa" on climate maps.

== Education ==
Residents are within the Yazoo County School District. Residents are zoned to Yazoo County Middle School and Yazoo County High School.
