= Kings Crossing site =

Archaeological type site

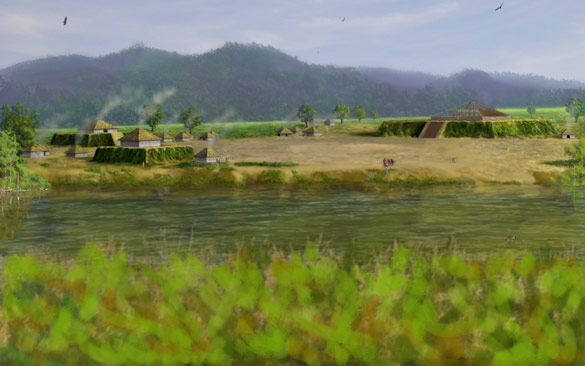
- A digital painting showing what the Kings Crossing site may have looked like at its peak. Artist Herb Roe

- Location within Mississippi today
- 32°24′7.49″N 90°51′17.64″W
- Periods: Kings Crossing Phase
- Cultures: Coles Creek culture
- Location: Vicksburg, Mississippi, Warren County, Mississippi, US
- Region: Warren County, Mississippi

History
- Built: 900 CE
- Abandoned: 1050

Site notes
- Archaeologists: Clarence B. Moore

Kings Crossing site is an archaeological site that is a type site for the Kings Crossing Phase (950-1050 CE) of the Lower Yazoo Basin Coles Creek chronology.

== Location ==
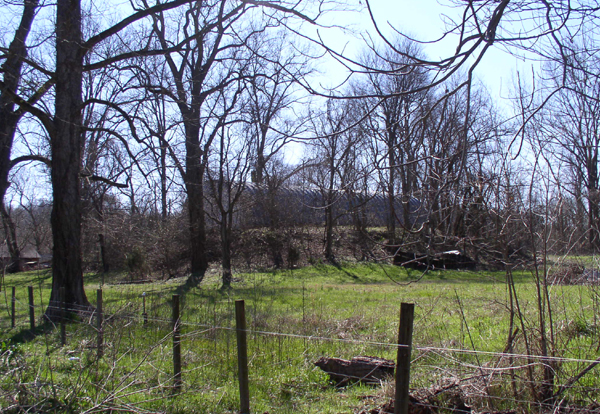
A photo of Mound A

The site is located four miles north of the center of Vicksburg, between Chickasaw Bayou and the Illinois Central railroad tracks.

== Site importance ==
Clarence B. Moore, who visited the site in 1908, described Mound A as being 25 feet (7.6 m) tall, although by the 1950s it had been significantly reduced in height. Mound B has been almost completely leveled, although a small rise can be discerned. Mound C is roughly 12 feet (3.7 m) tall. Mounds A and C are both roughly 120 feet (37 m) sq. Pottery sampling in the 1950s from Mound A gave the site a historical importance out of all proportion to its size. Test pits from a 1949 excavation of the Holly Bluff site produced an important glimpse of a late "transitional" Coles Creek to Plaquemine assemblage featuring thin tapered rims of polished plain ware and carefully executed varieties of Coles Creek incised and associated types. Although intriguing as pottery, it was not sufficiently integrated strategraphically to postulate a distinct phase. Site sampling from the Kings Crossing site in 1954 supplied the integration and gave the phase a name. Since then, especially in the Tensas Basin, it has become one of the firmest and most easily identifiable ceramic complexes in the Lower Mississippi area.

In 2005 the Kings Crossing site was portrayed on the Vicksburg Floodwall Mural project to represent the American Indian heritage of the region.

== See also ==
- Culture, phase, and chronological table for the Mississippi Valley
