= List of archaeological periods (North America) =

North American archaeological periods divide the history of pre-Columbian North America into successive named eras or periods, from the earliest known human habitation through to the early Colonial period which followed the European colonization of the Americas.

== Stage classification ==
One of the most enduring classifications of archaeological periods and cultures was established in Gordon Willey and Philip Phillips' 1958 book, Method and Theory in American Archaeology. They divided the archaeological record in the Americas into five phases, only three of which applied to North America. The use of these divisions has diminished in most of North America due to the development of local classifications with more elaborate breakdowns of times.

1. The Paleo-Indian stage and/or Lithic stage
2. The Archaic stage
3. The Formative stage – at this point, the North American classifications system differs from the rest of the Americas.

For more details on the five major stages, still used in Mesoamerican archaeology, see Mesoamerican chronology and Archaeology of the Americas.

== Table of archaeological periods North America ==
| Paleo Indians (Lithic stage) (18,000 – 8000 BCE) | | Clovis culture | | c. 11,500 – 10,800 BCE |
| Paleo Indians (Lithic stage) (18,000 – 8000 BCE) | | Western Stemmed Tradition | | c. 11,200 – 9000 BCE, California |
| Paleo Indians (Lithic stage) (18,000 – 8000 BCE) | | Post Pattern | | c. 11,000 – 7000 BCE, NW California |
| Paleo Indians (Lithic stage) (18,000 – 8000 BCE) | | Folsom tradition | | c. 10800 – 10200 BCE |
| Paleo Indians (Lithic stage) (18,000 – 8000 BCE) | | Dalton tradition | | c. 8500 – 7900 BCE |
| Archaic period (Archaic stage) (8000 – 1000 BCE) | by Time Period | Early Archaic; 8000 – 6000 BCE | Plano cultures | 9,000 – 5,000 BCE |
| Archaic period (Archaic stage) (8000 – 1000 BCE) | by Time Period | Early Archaic; 8000 – 6000 BCE | Paleo-Arctic tradition | 8000 – 5000 BCE |
| Archaic period (Archaic stage) (8000 – 1000 BCE) | by Time Period | Early Archaic; 8000 – 6000 BCE | Maritime Archaic | |
| Archaic period (Archaic stage) (8000 – 1000 BCE) | by Time Period | Early Archaic; 8000 – 6000 BCE | Red Paint People | 3000 – 1000 BCE |
| Archaic period (Archaic stage) (8000 – 1000 BCE) | by Time Period | Middle Archaic; 6000 – 3000 BCE | Chihuahua tradition | c. 6000 BCE – c. 250 CE |
| Archaic period (Archaic stage) (8000 – 1000 BCE) | by Time Period | Middle Archaic; 6000 – 3000 BCE | Watson Brake and Lower Mississippi Valley sites | c. 3500 – 2800 BCE |
| Archaic period (Archaic stage) (8000 – 1000 BCE) | by Time Period | Late Archaic; 3000 – 1000 BCE | Arctic Small Tool tradition | 2500 – 800 BCE |
| Archaic period (Archaic stage) (8000 – 1000 BCE) | by Time Period | Late Archaic; 3000 – 1000 BCE | Aleutian tradition | 2500 – 1800 BCE |
| Archaic period (Archaic stage) (8000 – 1000 BCE) | by Time Period | Late Archaic; 3000 – 1000 BCE | Poverty Point culture | 2200 – 700 BCE |
| Archaic period (Archaic stage) (8000 – 1000 BCE) | by Location | Great Basin | Early Archaic | |
| Archaic period (Archaic stage) (8000 – 1000 BCE) | by Location | Great Basin | Middle Archaic | |
| Archaic period (Archaic stage) (8000 – 1000 BCE) | by Location | Great Basin | Late Archaic | |
| Archaic period (Archaic stage) (8000 – 1000 BCE) | by Location | Great Lakes | Old Copper complex | c. 4000 – c. 1000 BCE |
| Archaic period (Archaic stage) (8000 – 1000 BCE) | by Location | Great Lakes | Red Ochre people | c. 1000 – 100 BCE |
| Archaic period (Archaic stage) (8000 – 1000 BCE) | by Location | Great Lakes | Glacial Kame culture | c. 8000 – 1000 BCE |
| Archaic period (Archaic stage) (8000 – 1000 BCE) | by Location | Great Plains | Plains Archaic | c. 9500 – 5500 BCE |
| Archaic period (Archaic stage) (8000 – 1000 BCE) | by Location | Mesoamerica | Archaic Period in Mesoamerica | |
| Archaic period (Archaic stage) (8000 – 1000 BCE) | by Location | Southwest: Southwestern Archaic Traditions | Archaic–Early Basketmaker period | c. 7000 – c. 1500 BCE |
| Archaic period (Archaic stage) (8000 – 1000 BCE) | by Location | Southwest: Southwestern Archaic Traditions | San Dieguito–Pinto tradition | c. 6500 BCE – c. 200 CE |
| Archaic period (Archaic stage) (8000 – 1000 BCE) | by Location | Southwest: Southwestern Archaic Traditions | Chihuahua (Southeastern) tradition | c. 6000 BCE – c. 250 CE |
| Archaic period (Archaic stage) (8000 – 1000 BCE) | by Location | Southwest: Southwestern Archaic Traditions | Oshara (Northern) tradition | c. 5500 BCE – c. 600 CE |
| Archaic period (Archaic stage) (8000 – 1000 BCE) | by Location | Southwest: Southwestern Archaic Traditions | Cochise tradition | 5000 – 200 BCE |
| Archaic period (Archaic stage) (8000 – 1000 BCE) | by Location | California | Millingstone Horizon (or Encinitas tradition) | c. 5500 – 1500 BCE |
| Archaic period (Archaic stage) (8000 – 1000 BCE) | by Location | California | Intermediate Horizon (or Campbell tradition) | c. 1500 BCE – 1000 CE |
| Archaic period (Archaic stage) (8000 – 1000 BCE) | by Location | Southeast | Mount Taylor period | 5000 – 2000 BCE |
| Archaic period (Archaic stage) (8000 – 1000 BCE) | by Location | Southeast | Eva culture | 6000 - 1000 BCE |
| Archaic period (Archaic stage) (8000 – 1000 BCE) | by Location | Southeast | Stallings Island (St. Simons) culture | 2500 – 1000 BCE |
| Archaic period (Archaic stage) (8000 – 1000 BCE) | by Location | Southeast | Thoms Creek culture | 2500 – 1000 BCE |
| Archaic period (Archaic stage) (8000 – 1000 BCE) | by Location | Southeast | Poverty Point culture | 2200 – 700 BCE |
| Archaic period (Archaic stage) (8000 – 1000 BCE) | by Location | Southeast | Elliott's Point complex | 2000 – 700 BCE |
| Archaic period (Archaic stage) (8000 – 1000 BCE) | by Location | Southeast | Norwood culture | 2000 – 500 BCE |
| Archaic period (Archaic stage) (8000 – 1000 BCE) | by Location | Southeast | Orange culture | 2000 – 500 BCE |
| Post-archaic period, (incorporating Formative, Classic and post-Classic stages) (1000 BCE – present) | in North | Norton tradition | Choris Stage | c. 1000 – 500 BCE |
| Post-archaic period, (incorporating Formative, Classic and post-Classic stages) (1000 BCE – present) | in North | Norton tradition | Norton | 500 BCE – 800 CE |
| Post-archaic period, (incorporating Formative, Classic and post-Classic stages) (1000 BCE – present) | in North | Norton tradition | Ipiutak Stage | 1 CE – 800 CE |
| Post-archaic period, (incorporating Formative, Classic and post-Classic stages) (1000 BCE – present) | in North | Dorset culture | | 500 BCE – 1500 CE |
| Post-archaic period, (incorporating Formative, Classic and post-Classic stages) (1000 BCE – present) | in North | Thule people | | 200 BCE – 1600 CE |
| Post-archaic period, (incorporating Formative, Classic and post-Classic stages) (1000 BCE – present) | on Great Plains | Plains Woodland | | c. 500 BCE – 1000 CE |
| Post-archaic period, (incorporating Formative, Classic and post-Classic stages) (1000 BCE – present) | on Great Plains | Plains Village | | c. 1000 – 1780 CE |
| Post-archaic period, (incorporating Formative, Classic and post-Classic stages) (1000 BCE – present) | in Southwest and by Pecos Classification | Early Basketmaker II period | | 1500 BCE – 50 CE |
| Post-archaic period, (incorporating Formative, Classic and post-Classic stages) (1000 BCE – present) | in Southwest and by Pecos Classification | Late Basketmaker II period | | 50 CE – 500 CE |
| Post-archaic period, (incorporating Formative, Classic and post-Classic stages) (1000 BCE – present) | in Southwest and by Pecos Classification | Basketmaker III period | | 500 CE – 750 CE |
| Post-archaic period, (incorporating Formative, Classic and post-Classic stages) (1000 BCE – present) | in Southwest and by Pecos Classification | Pueblo I period | | 750 CE – 900 CE |
| Post-archaic period, (incorporating Formative, Classic and post-Classic stages) (1000 BCE – present) | in Southwest and by Pecos Classification | Pueblo II period | | 900 CE – 1150 CE |
| Post-archaic period, (incorporating Formative, Classic and post-Classic stages) (1000 BCE – present) | in Southwest and by Pecos Classification | Pueblo III period | | 1150 CE – 1350 CE |
| Post-archaic period, (incorporating Formative, Classic and post-Classic stages) (1000 BCE – present) | in Southwest and by Pecos Classification | Pueblo IV period | | 1350 CE – 1600 CE |
| Post-archaic period, (incorporating Formative, Classic and post-Classic stages) (1000 BCE – present) | in Southwest and by Pecos Classification | Pueblo V period | | 1600 CE – present |
| Post-archaic period, (incorporating Formative, Classic and post-Classic stages) (1000 BCE – present) | in Southwest and by peoples | Ancestral Puebloans (formerly Anasazi) | | 1 CE – 1300 CE |
| Post-archaic period, (incorporating Formative, Classic and post-Classic stages) (1000 BCE – present) | in Southwest and by peoples | Hohokam | | 200 CE – 1450 CE |
| Post-archaic period, (incorporating Formative, Classic and post-Classic stages) (1000 BCE – present) | in Southwest and by peoples | Fremont | | 400 CE – 1350 CE |
| Post-archaic period, (incorporating Formative, Classic and post-Classic stages) (1000 BCE – present) | in Southwest and by peoples | Patayan | | 700 CE – 1550 CE |
| Post-archaic period, (incorporating Formative, Classic and post-Classic stages) (1000 BCE – present) | in Southwest and by peoples | Mogollon | | 700 CE – 1400 CE |
| Post-archaic period, (incorporating Formative, Classic and post-Classic stages) (1000 BCE – present) | in East and by peoples | Early Woodland Period; 1000 BCE – 1 CE | Adena culture | 1000 – 100 BCE |
| Post-archaic period, (incorporating Formative, Classic and post-Classic stages) (1000 BCE – present) | in East and by peoples | Early Woodland Period; 1000 BCE – 1 CE | Deptford culture – Atlantic region | 800 BCE – 700 CE |
| Post-archaic period, (incorporating Formative, Classic and post-Classic stages) (1000 BCE – present) | in East and by peoples | Early Woodland Period; 1000 BCE – 1 CE | Deptford culture – Gulf region | 500 BCE – 200 CE |
| Post-archaic period, (incorporating Formative, Classic and post-Classic stages) (1000 BCE – present) | in East and by peoples | Middle Woodland Period; 1 – 500 | Point Peninsula complex (a Hopewellian culture) | 600 BCE – 700 CE |
| Post-archaic period, (incorporating Formative, Classic and post-Classic stages) (1000 BCE – present) | in East and by peoples | Middle Woodland Period; 1 – 500 | Laurel complex (a Hopewellian culture) | 300 BCE – 1100 CE |
| Post-archaic period, (incorporating Formative, Classic and post-Classic stages) (1000 BCE – present) | in East and by peoples | Middle Woodland Period; 1 – 500 | Hopewell culture | 200 BCE – 500 CE |
| Post-archaic period, (incorporating Formative, Classic and post-Classic stages) (1000 BCE – present) | in East and by peoples | Middle Woodland Period; 1 – 500 | Havana Hopewell culture (a Hopewellian culture) | 200 BCE to 400 CE |
| Post-archaic period, (incorporating Formative, Classic and post-Classic stages) (1000 BCE – present) | in East and by peoples | Middle Woodland Period; 1 – 500 | Goodall focus (a Hopewellian culture) | 200 BCE to 500 CE |
| Post-archaic period, (incorporating Formative, Classic and post-Classic stages) (1000 BCE – present) | in East and by peoples | Middle Woodland Period; 1 – 500 | Saugeen complex (a Hopewellian culture) | 200 BCE to 500 CE |
| Post-archaic period, (incorporating Formative, Classic and post-Classic stages) (1000 BCE – present) | in East and by peoples | Middle Woodland Period; 1 – 500 | Kansas City Hopewell (a Hopewellian culture) | 100 BCE – 700 CE |
| Post-archaic period, (incorporating Formative, Classic and post-Classic stages) (1000 BCE – present) | in East and by peoples | Middle Woodland Period; 1 – 500 | Armstrong culture (a Hopewellian culture) | 1 – 500 CE |
| Post-archaic period, (incorporating Formative, Classic and post-Classic stages) (1000 BCE – present) | in East and by peoples | Middle Woodland Period; 1 – 500 | Swift Creek culture (a Hopewellian culture) | 100 – 800 CE |
| Post-archaic period, (incorporating Formative, Classic and post-Classic stages) (1000 BCE – present) | in East and by peoples | Middle Woodland Period; 1 – 500 | Santa Rosa-Swift Creek culture (a Hopewellian culture) | 100 – 300 CE |
| Post-archaic period, (incorporating Formative, Classic and post-Classic stages) (1000 BCE – present) | in East and by peoples | Middle Woodland Period; 1 – 500 | Marksville culture (a Hopewellian culture) | 100 BCE – 400 CE |
| Post-archaic period, (incorporating Formative, Classic and post-Classic stages) (1000 BCE – present) | in East and by peoples | Middle Woodland Period; 1 – 500 | Fourche Maline culture | 300 BCE to 800 CE |
| Post-archaic period, (incorporating Formative, Classic and post-Classic stages) (1000 BCE – present) | in East and by peoples | Middle Woodland Period; 1 – 500 | Copena culture (a Hopewellian culture) | 1 – 500 CE |
| Post-archaic period, (incorporating Formative, Classic and post-Classic stages) (1000 BCE – present) | in East and by peoples | Late Woodland Period; 500–1000 | Baytown culture | 300–700 CE |
| Post-archaic period, (incorporating Formative, Classic and post-Classic stages) (1000 BCE – present) | in East and by peoples | Late Woodland Period; 500–1000 | Plum Bayou culture | 400–900 CE |
| Post-archaic period, (incorporating Formative, Classic and post-Classic stages) (1000 BCE – present) | in East and by peoples | Late Woodland Period; 500–1000 | Troyville culture | 300–700 CE |
| Post-archaic period, (incorporating Formative, Classic and post-Classic stages) (1000 BCE – present) | in East and by peoples | Late Woodland Period; 500–1000 | Coles Creek culture | 700 – 1100 CE |
| Post-archaic period, (incorporating Formative, Classic and post-Classic stages) (1000 BCE – present) | in East and by peoples | Mississippian culture 900–1500 (ending with European contact) | Early Mississippian culture | 1000 – 1200 CE |
| Post-archaic period, (incorporating Formative, Classic and post-Classic stages) (1000 BCE – present) | in East and by peoples | Mississippian culture 900–1500 (ending with European contact) | Middle Mississippian culture | 1200 – 1400 CE |
| Post-archaic period, (incorporating Formative, Classic and post-Classic stages) (1000 BCE – present) | in East and by peoples | Mississippian culture 900–1500 (ending with European contact) | Late Mississippian culture | 1400 – 1500 CE (or European contact) |
| Post-archaic period, (incorporating Formative, Classic and post-Classic stages) (1000 BCE – present) | in East and by peoples | Fort Ancient (a non-Mississippian culture) | | 1000 – 1550 CE |
| Post-archaic period, (incorporating Formative, Classic and post-Classic stages) (1000 BCE – present) | in East and by peoples | Oneota | | 900 – 1650 CE |
| Post-archaic period, (incorporating Formative, Classic and post-Classic stages) (1000 BCE – present) | in East and by peoples | Lamar culture | | 1350 – 1600 CE |
| Post-archaic period, (incorporating Formative, Classic and post-Classic stages) (1000 BCE – present) | in Florida and adjacent parts of Alabama and Georgia, by culture | Belle Glade culture | | 1050 BCE – European contact |
| Post-archaic period, (incorporating Formative, Classic and post-Classic stages) (1000 BCE – present) | in Florida and adjacent parts of Alabama and Georgia, by culture | Glades culture | | 550 BCE – European contact |
| Post-archaic period, (incorporating Formative, Classic and post-Classic stages) (1000 BCE – present) | in Florida and adjacent parts of Alabama and Georgia, by culture | Manasota culture | | 550 BCE – 800 CE |
| Post-archaic period, (incorporating Formative, Classic and post-Classic stages) (1000 BCE – present) | in Florida and adjacent parts of Alabama and Georgia, by culture | St. Johns culture | | 550 BCE – European contact |
| Post-archaic period, (incorporating Formative, Classic and post-Classic stages) (1000 BCE – present) | in Florida and adjacent parts of Alabama and Georgia, by culture | Caloosahatchee culture | | 500 BCE – European contact |
| Post-archaic period, (incorporating Formative, Classic and post-Classic stages) (1000 BCE – present) | in Florida and adjacent parts of Alabama and Georgia, by culture | Malabar culture or Indian River culture | | 500 BCE–763 CE |
| Post-archaic period, (incorporating Formative, Classic and post-Classic stages) (1000 BCE – present) | in Florida and adjacent parts of Alabama and Georgia, by culture | Weeden Island culture 100–1000 CE | Weeden Island I, including | 100–750 CE |
| Post-archaic period, (incorporating Formative, Classic and post-Classic stages) (1000 BCE – present) | in Florida and adjacent parts of Alabama and Georgia, by culture | Weeden Island culture 100–1000 CE | – Cades Pond culture | 100–600 CE |
| Post-archaic period, (incorporating Formative, Classic and post-Classic stages) (1000 BCE – present) | in Florida and adjacent parts of Alabama and Georgia, by culture | Weeden Island culture 100–1000 CE | – Kolomaki culture | 350–750 CE |
| Post-archaic period, (incorporating Formative, Classic and post-Classic stages) (1000 BCE – present) | in Florida and adjacent parts of Alabama and Georgia, by culture | Weeden Island culture 100–1000 CE | – McKeithen Weeden Island culture | 200–750 CE |
| Post-archaic period, (incorporating Formative, Classic and post-Classic stages) (1000 BCE – present) | in Florida and adjacent parts of Alabama and Georgia, by culture | Weeden Island culture 100–1000 CE | Weeden Island II, including | 750–1000 CE |
| Post-archaic period, (incorporating Formative, Classic and post-Classic stages) (1000 BCE – present) | in Florida and adjacent parts of Alabama and Georgia, by culture | Weeden Island culture 100–1000 CE | – Wakulla culture | 750–1000 CE |
| Post-archaic period, (incorporating Formative, Classic and post-Classic stages) (1000 BCE – present) | in Florida and adjacent parts of Alabama and Georgia, by culture | Alachua culture | | 600 – European contact |
| Post-archaic period, (incorporating Formative, Classic and post-Classic stages) (1000 BCE – present) | in Florida and adjacent parts of Alabama and Georgia, by culture | Suwannee Valley culture | | 750 – European contact |
| Post-archaic period, (incorporating Formative, Classic and post-Classic stages) (1000 BCE – present) | in Florida and adjacent parts of Alabama and Georgia, by culture | Safety Harbor culture | | 800 – European contact |
| Post-archaic period, (incorporating Formative, Classic and post-Classic stages) (1000 BCE – present) | in Florida and adjacent parts of Alabama and Georgia, by culture | Fort Walton culture a Mississippian culture | | 1000 – European contact |
| Post-archaic period, (incorporating Formative, Classic and post-Classic stages) (1000 BCE – present) | in Florida and adjacent parts of Alabama and Georgia, by culture | Pensacola culture | | 1250 – European contact |

== Culture, phase, and chronological table for the Mississippi Valley ==
| Lower Mississippi periods | Lower Yazoo phases | Lower Yazoo dates | Tensas/Natchez phases | Cahokia Phases | Cahokia dates | Ohio/Miss. River Confluence phases | Ohio/Miss. dates |
|---|---|---|---|---|---|---|---|
| Historic | Russell (Tunica) | 1650–1750 CE | Tensas / Natchez | Vacant; Quarter | 1350 CE - European Contact | Jackson | 1500-1650 CE |
| Plaquemine Mississippian culture Late Plaquemine/Mississippian; Middle Plaquemine/Mississippian; Early Plaquemine/Mississippian | Wasp Lake | 1400-1650 CE | Transylvania / Emerald | Vacant; Quarter | 1350 CE - European Contact | Jackson | 1500-1650 CE |
| Plaquemine Mississippian culture Late Plaquemine/Mississippian; Middle Plaquemine/Mississippian; Early Plaquemine/Mississippian | Lake George | 1300-1400 CE | Fitzhugh / Foster | Sand Prairie | 1275-1350 CE | Medley Phase | 1300-1500 CE |
| Plaquemine Mississippian culture Late Plaquemine/Mississippian; Middle Plaquemine/Mississippian; Early Plaquemine/Mississippian | Winterville | 1200-1300 CE | Routh / Anna | Moorehead | 1200-1275 CE | Dorena | 1100-1300 CE |
| Transitional Coles Creek | Crippen Point | 1050-1200 CE | Preston / Gordon | Lohmann; Sterling | 1050-1200 CE | Dorena | 1100-1300 CE |
| Coles Creek culture Late Coles Creek; Middle Coles Creek; Early Coles Creek | Kings Crossing | 950-1050 CE | Balmoral | Terminal Late; Woodland | 900–1050 CE | James Bayou | 900-1100 CE |
| Coles Creek culture Late Coles Creek; Middle Coles Creek; Early Coles Creek | Aden | 800-950 CE | Ballina | Terminal Late; Woodland | 900–1050 CE | James Bayou | 900-1100 CE |
| Coles Creek culture Late Coles Creek; Middle Coles Creek; Early Coles Creek | Bayland | 600-800 CE | Sundown | Late; Woodland | 400–900 CE | Cane Hills; Berkley | 600–900 CE; 400–600 CE |
| Baytown/Troyville; Baytown 2 Baytown 1 | Deasonville | 500-600 CE | Marsden | Late; Woodland | 400–900 CE | Cane Hills; Berkley | 600–900 CE; 400–600 CE |
| Baytown/Troyville; Baytown 2 Baytown 1 | Little Sunflower | 400-500 CE | Indian Bayou | Late; Woodland | 400–900 CE | Cane Hills; Berkley | 600–900 CE; 400–600 CE |
| Marksville culture Late Marksville; Early Marksville | Issaquena | 200-400 CE | Issaquena | Middle; Woodland | 200 BCE - 400 CE | La Plant; Burkett | 100 BCE-400 CE; 550-100 BCE |
| Marksville culture Late Marksville; Early Marksville | Anderson; Landing | 1-200 CE | Point Lake/ Grand Gulf | Middle; Woodland | 200 BCE - 400 CE | La Plant; Burkett | 100 BCE-400 CE; 550-100 BCE |
| Tchefuncte culture | Tuscola | 400 BCE-1 CE | Panther Lake | Middle; Woodland | 200 BCE - 400 CE | La Plant; Burkett | 100 BCE-400 CE; 550-100 BCE |
| Jaketown | Poverty Point | 700- 400 BCE | Frasier | Early Woodland | 700-200 BCE | O'Bryan Ridge | 700-550 BCE |
| - | Poverty Point | 1000-700 BCE | - | Late Archaic | 1000 - 200 BCE | O'Bryan Ridge | 700-550 BCE |

== See also ==
Historiography

- List of archaeological periods (Mesoamerica)
- List of archaeological periods (Belize)
- List of archaeological periods (Peru)
- List of archaeological periods – worldwide

Other

- Archaeogenetics
- Archaeological culture
- Archaeology of the Americas
- Genetic history of indigenous peoples of the Americas

== Notes ==
1. Lower Mississippi, Lower Yazoo, and Tensas/Natchez table taken from "Emerging Patterns of Plum Bayou Culture:Preliminary Investigations of the Toltec Mounds Research Project", by Martha Ann Rolingson, 1982, Pg-66.
2. Cahokia phases and dates taken from "Ancient Cahokia and the Mississippians", by Pauketat, Timothy R., 2004, Pp-6.
3. Ohio and Mississippi River Confluence Phases and dates taken from "Kentucky Archaeology", edited by R. Barry Lewis, 1996, Pg - 16.

== Bibliography ==
- Milanich, Jerald T. (1995). Florida Indians and the Invasion from Europe. Gainesville, Florida. ISBN 978-0-8130-1360-2.
- Milanich, Jerald T. (1990). "State of Florida Office of Cultural and Historical Programs. Florida Historical Contexts" (PDF). Florida Historical Contexts.
- Milanich, Jerald T.; Payne, Claudine, eds. (September 27, 1993). "State of Florida Office of Cultural and Historical Programs. Historic Contexts (in full)" (DOC). Florida Historical Contexts.
- Milanich, Jerald T. (1998) Florida's Indians from Ancient Times to the Present. University Press of Florida. ISBN 0-8130-1599-5
- Milanich, Jerald T. (1994) Archaeology of Precolumbian Florida. University Press of Florida. ISBN 0-8130-1273-2
- "National Park Service Southeast Archaeological Center - The Woodland Period (ca. 2000 B.C.- A.D. 1000)". Outline of Prehistory and History. Archived from the original on February 29, 2012.
- Philip Phillips (1970). Archaeological Survey In The Lower Yazoo Basin, Mississippi, 1949-1955(Part One). Published by the Peabody Museum, Cambridge, Massachusetts. Library of Congress Catalog Card No. 77-80028.
