= Poverty Point culture =

Archaeological culture that inhabited the lower Mississippi Valley, US

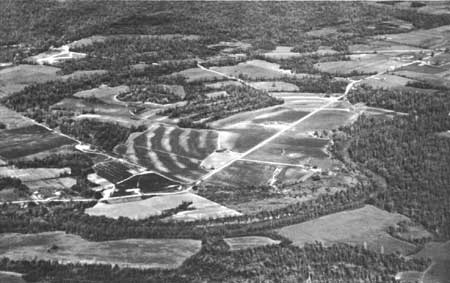
Aerial view of the Poverty Point earthworks, built by the prehistoric Poverty Point culture, located in present-day Louisiana.

The Poverty Point culture is the archaeological culture of prehistoric indigenous peoples who inhabited a portion of North America's lower Mississippi Valley and surrounding Gulf coast from about 1730 – 1350 BC. They are named after their best-known archeological site.

Archeologists have identified more than 100 sites belonging to this mound-builder culture, who also formed a large trading network throughout much of the eastern part of what is now the United States.

== History ==
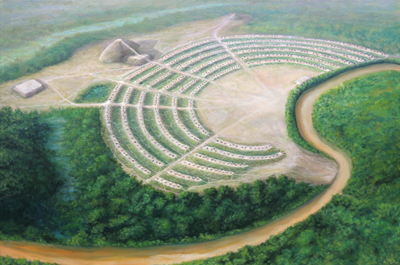
Artist's reconstruction

Preceding the Poverty Point Culture is the Watson Brake site in present-day Ouachita Parish, Louisiana, where eleven earthwork mounds were built beginning about 3500 BC. Watson Brake is one of the earliest mound complexes in the Americas. Next oldest is the Poverty Point Culture, which thrived from 1730 to 1350 BC, during the late Archaic period in North America. Evidence of this mound builder culture has been found at more than 100 sites, including the Jaketown Site near Belzoni, Mississippi. The largest and best-known site is at Poverty Point, located on the Macon Ridge near present-day Epps, Louisiana. The culture is named for the archeological site, which is in turn named after a 19th century cotton plantation built in the area.

The Poverty Point culture may have hit its peak around 1500 BC. It is one of the oldest complex cultures, and possibly the first tribal culture in the Mississippi Delta and in the present-day United States. The people occupied villages that extended for nearly 100 miles (160 km) on either side of the Mississippi River.

Poverty Point culture was followed by the Tchefuncte and Lake Cormorant cultures of the Tchula period, a local manifestation of the early Woodland period. These descendant cultures differed from Poverty Point culture in trading over shorter distances, creating less massive public projects, completely adopting ceramics for storage and cooking, and lacking a lapidary (stone-carving) industry.

== Earthworks ==
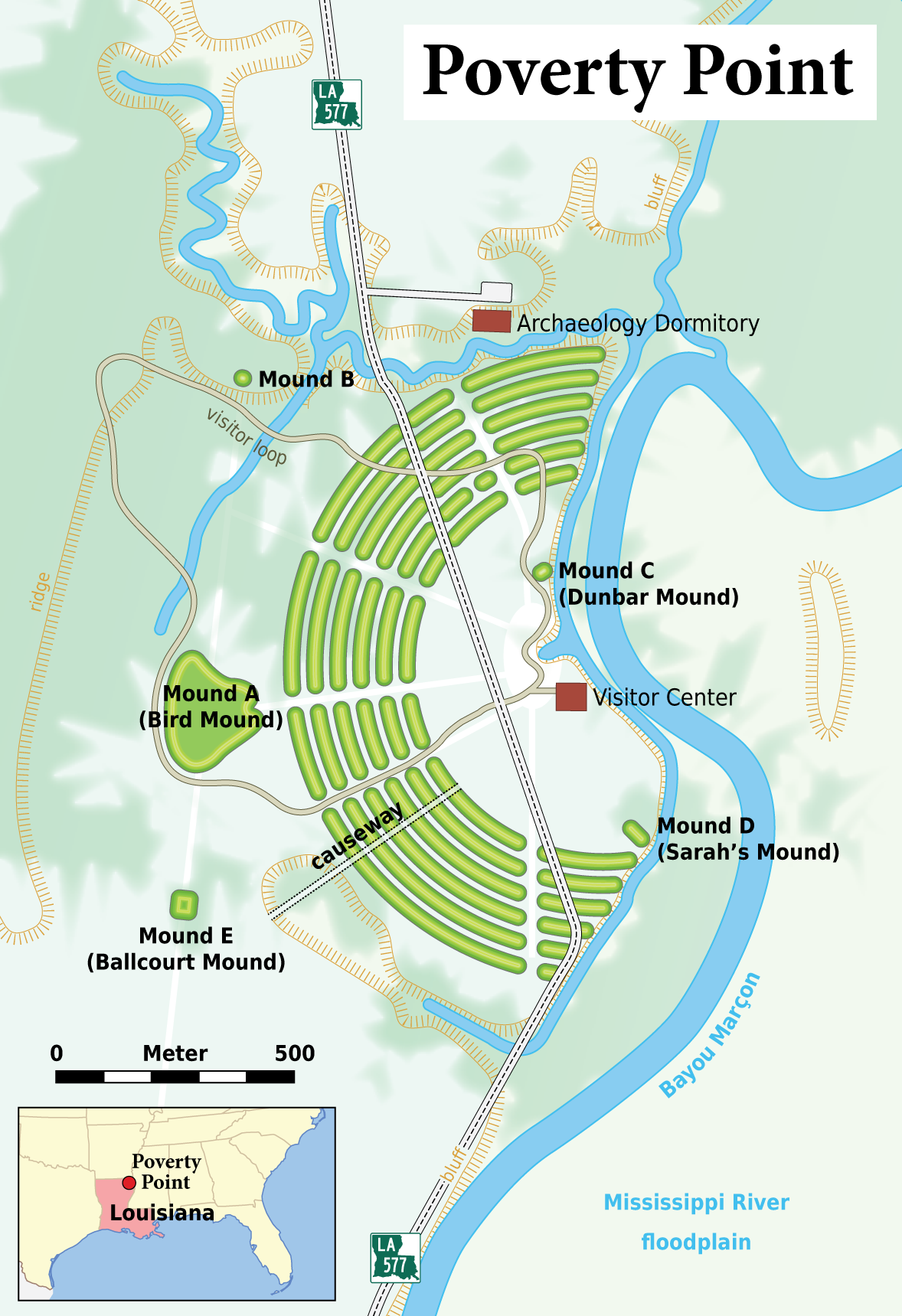
Map of site with 2008 structures

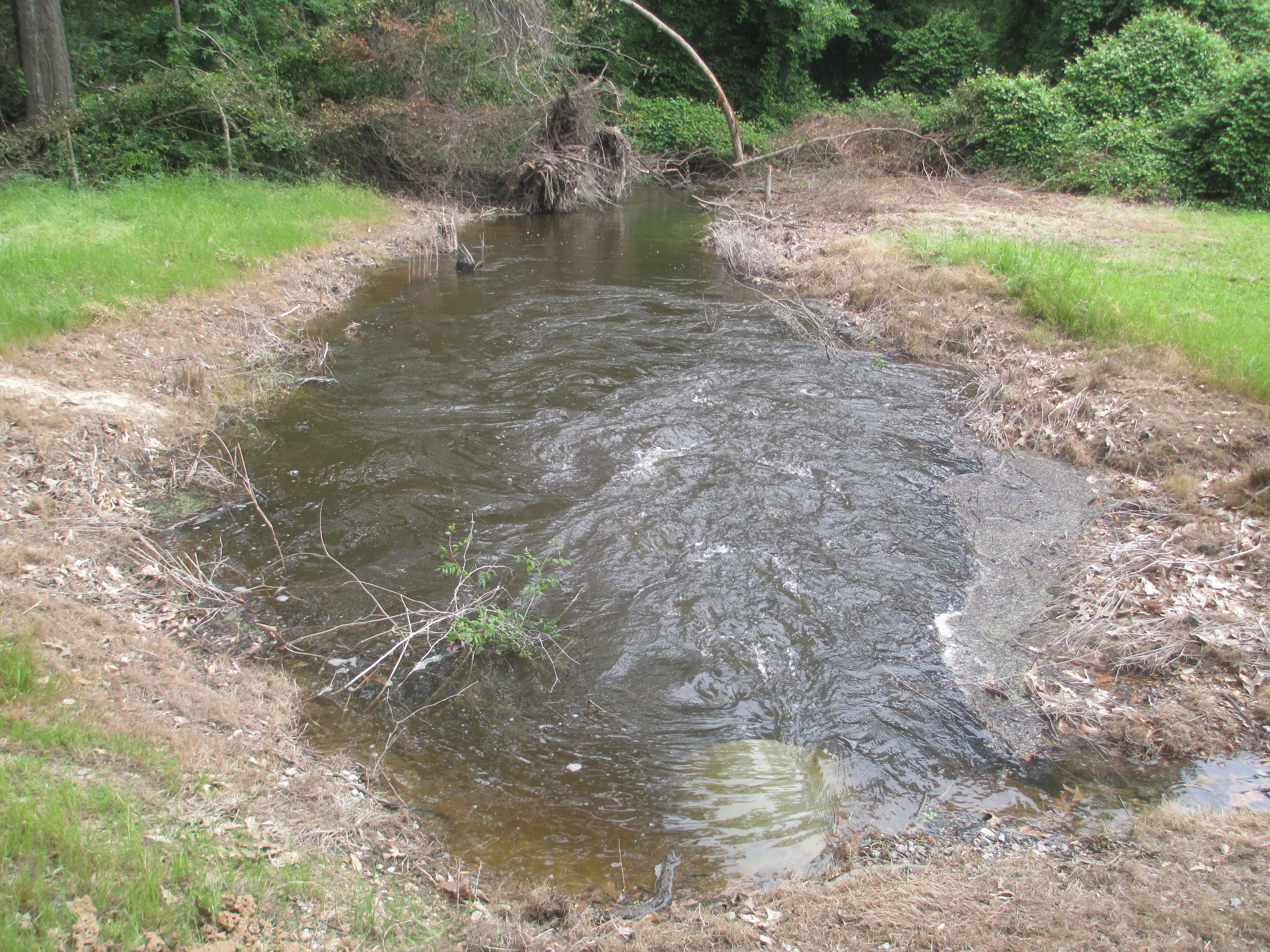
Swale with a flowing stream

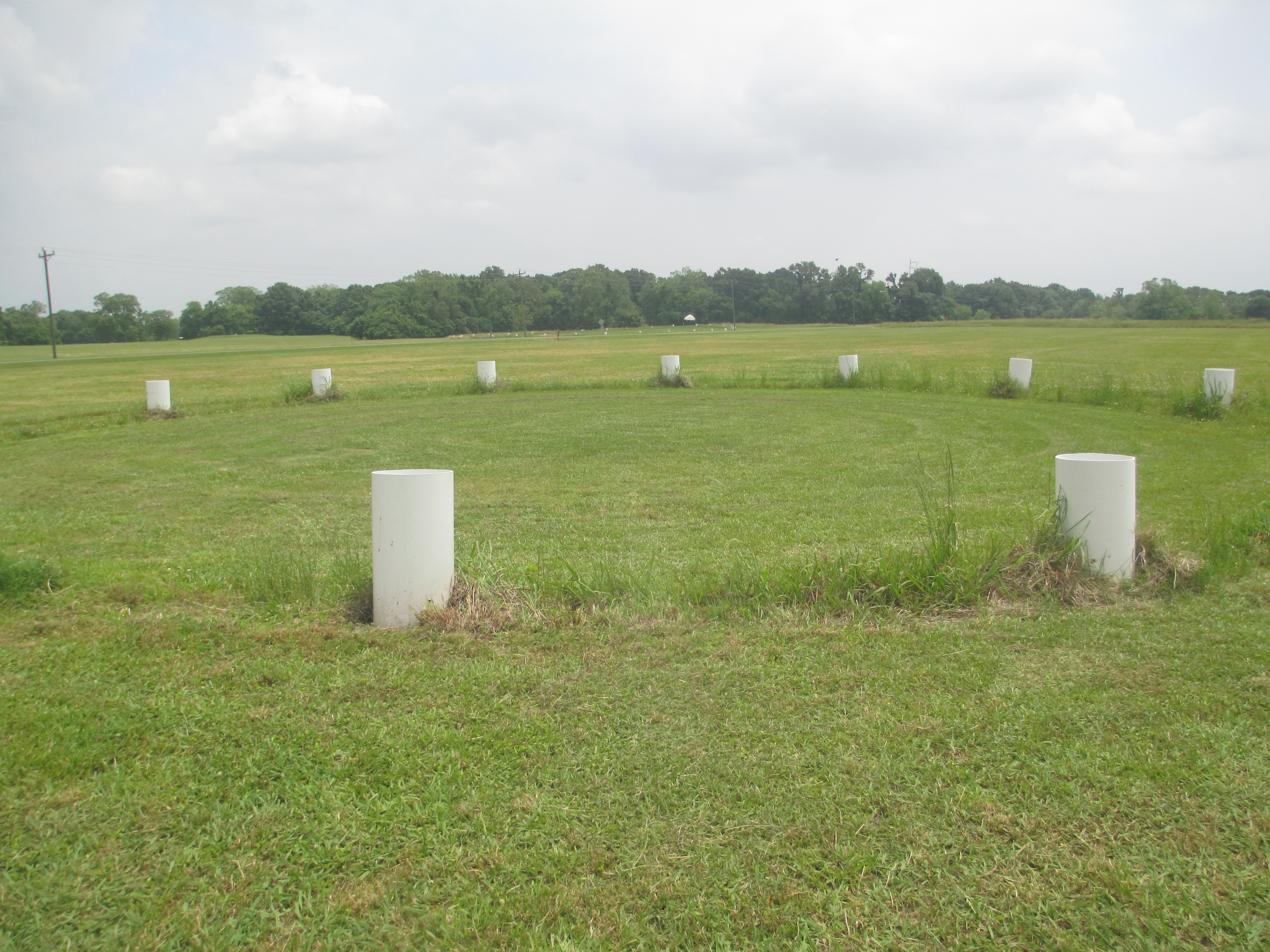
Circular structure

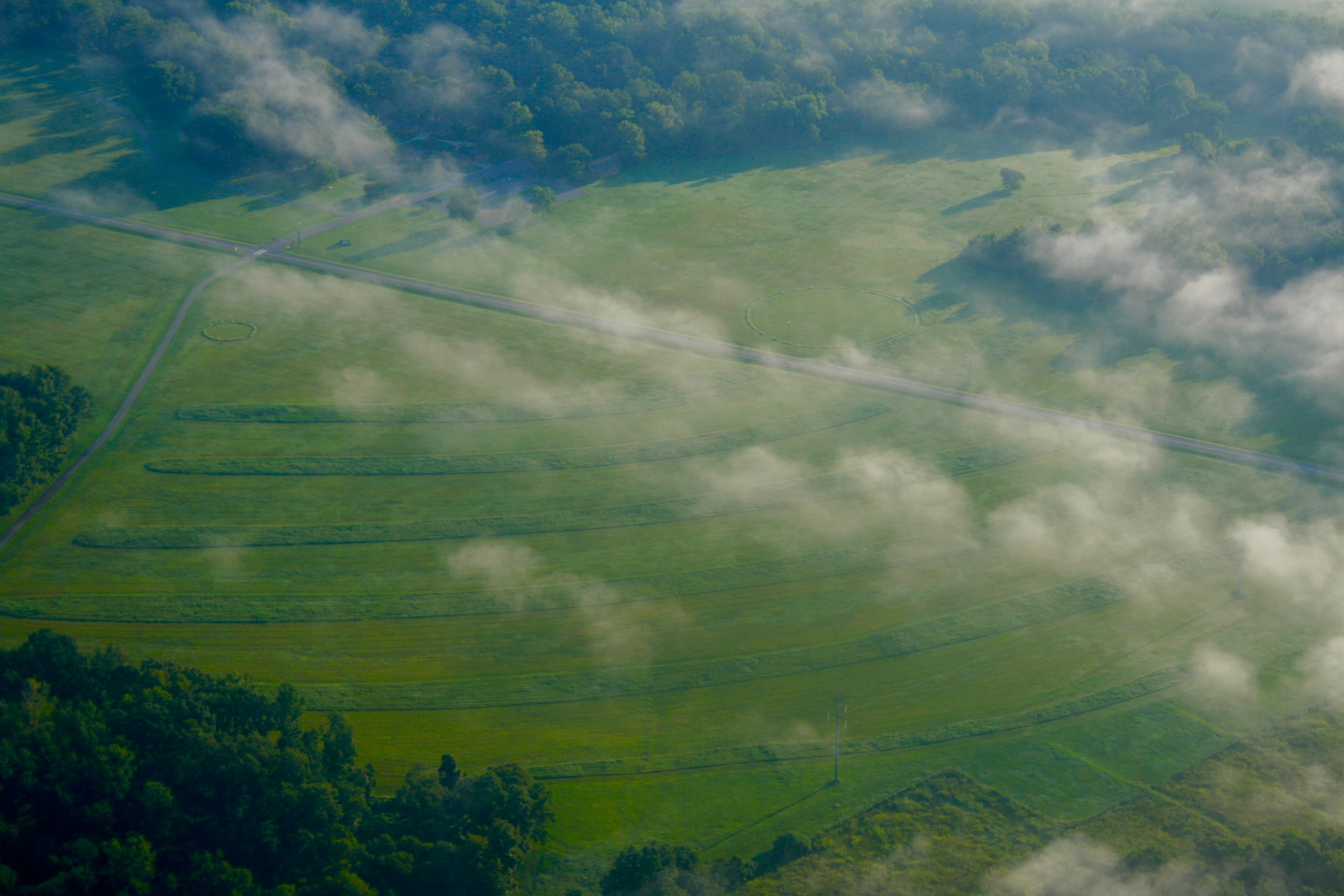
Ridges

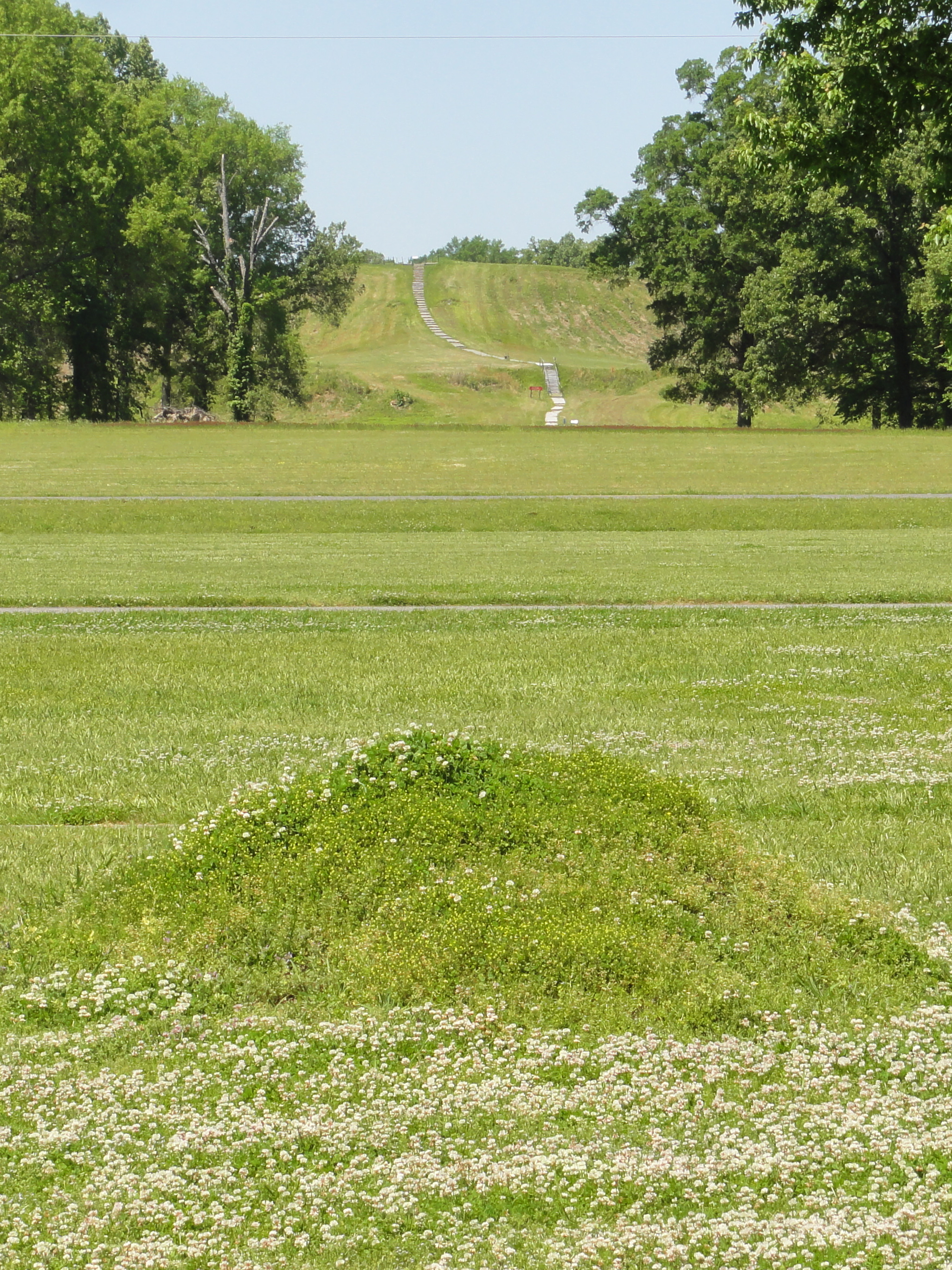
Mounds

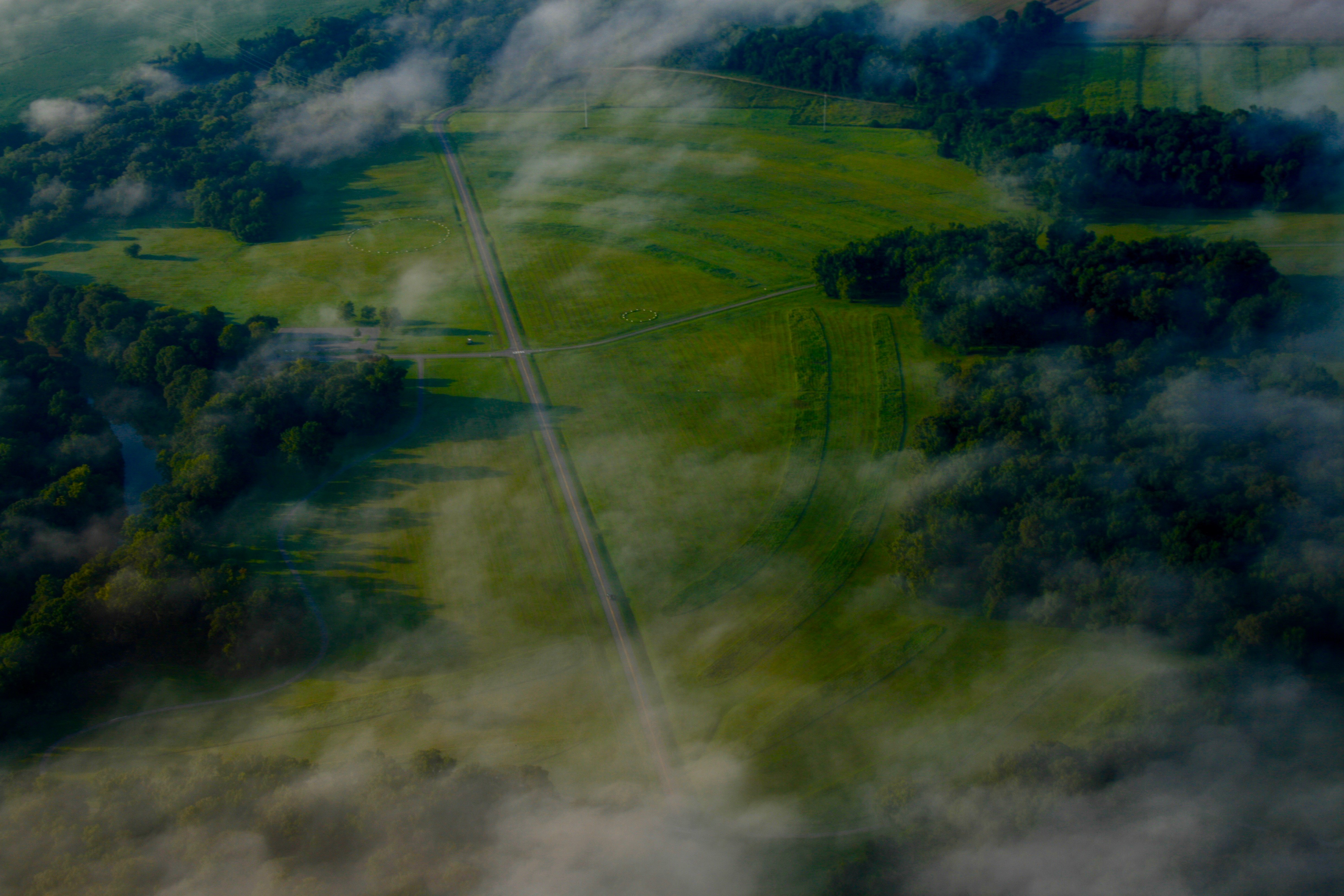
Bayou Marçon waterway at left, ridges at right

Although the earthworks at Poverty Point are not the oldest in the United States (those at Watson Brake were built about 1900 years earlier), they are notable as the oldest earthworks of this size in the Western Hemisphere. In the center of the site is a plaza covering about 15 hectares or 37 acres (150,000 m^{2}). Archeologists believe the plaza was the site of public ceremonies, rituals, dances, games and other major community activities.

The site has six concentric earthworks separated by ditches, or swales, where dirt was removed to build the ridges. The ends of the outermost ridge are 1,204 metres (3,950 ft) apart, which is nearly 3/4 of a mile. The ends of the interior embankment are 594 metres (1,949 ft) apart. If the ridges were straightened and laid end to end, they would compose an embankment of 12 kilometres (7.5 mi) long. Originally, the ridges stood 4 feet (1.2 m) to 6 feet (1.8 m) high and 140 feet (43 m) to 200 feet (61 m) apart. Many years of plowing have reduced some to only 1 foot (0.30 m) in height. Archeologists believe that the homes of 500 to 1,000 inhabitants were located on these ridges.

It was the largest settlement at that time in North America. The site also had a 50 feet (15 m) high, 500 feet (150 m) long earthen pyramid, which was aligned east to west. A large bird effigy mound, measuring 70 feet (21 m) high and 640 feet (200 m) across, is also located on the site.

On the western side of the plaza, archeologists have found some unusually deep pits. One explanation is these holes once held huge wooden posts, which served as calendar markers. Using the sun’s shadows, the inhabitants could have predicted the changing of the seasons. This great building project demanded a sustained investment of human labor, and the organized skill and cultural will to sustain the effort over many centuries. One authority calculated that it would take more than 1,236,007 cubic feet (34,999.8 m^{3}) of basket-loaded soil to complete the earthworks. That would mean 1,350 adults laboring 70 days a year for three years.

== Artifacts ==
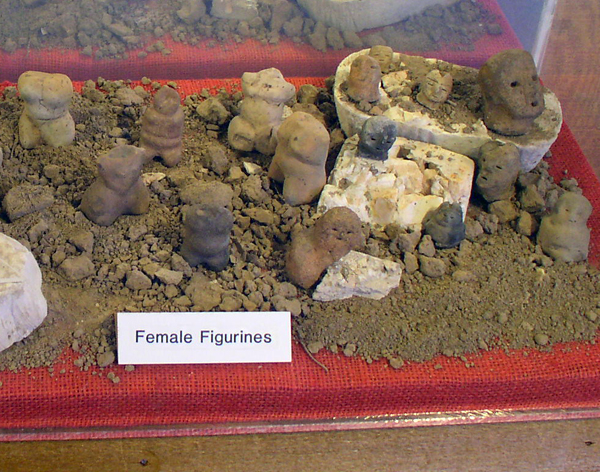
Female effigies, clay

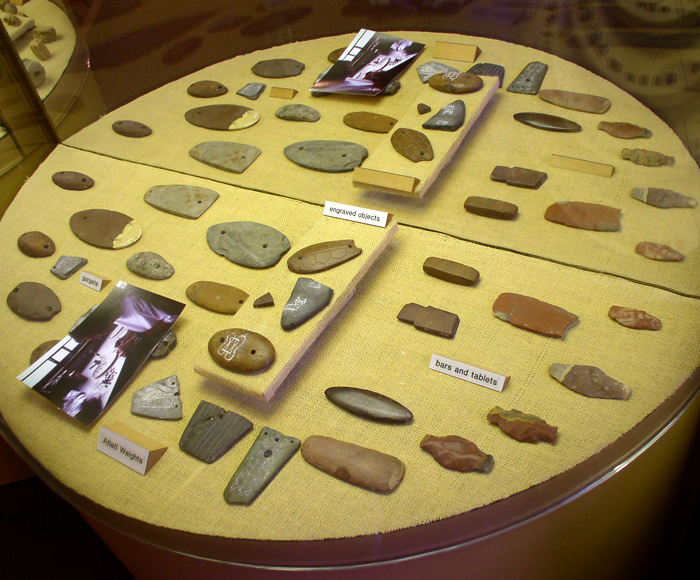
Atlatl weights and carved stone gorgets

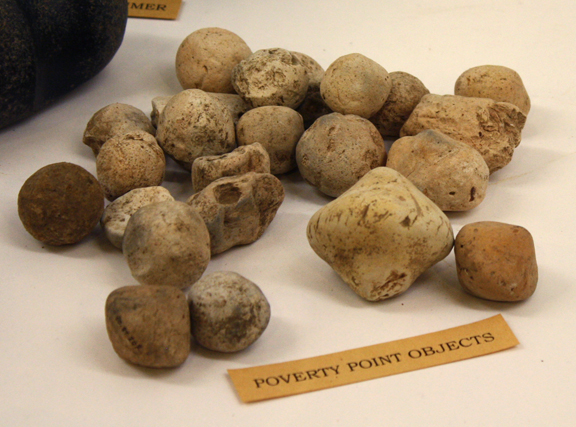
Baked loess objects used in cooking, dating from 1650 and 700 BCE

Archeological excavation has revealed a wealth of artifacts, including animal effigy figures; hand-molded, baked-clay cooking objects; simple thick-walled pottery; stone vessels, spear points, adzes, hoes, drills, edge-retouched flakes, and blades. Stone cooking balls were used to prepare meals. Scholars believe dozens of the cooking balls were heated in a bonfire and dropped in pits along with food. Different-shaped balls controlled cooking temperatures and cooking time.

Crude human figures, forming another category of artifacts, are thought to have been used for religious purposes. Points made of imported gray Midwestern flint were also found. In addition, plummets were fashioned out of heavy iron ore imported from Hot Springs, Arkansas; they served as weights for fish nets. Many of the raw materials used, such as slate, copper, galena, jasper, quartz, and soapstone, were from as far as 620 miles (1,000 km) away, attesting to the distant reach of the trading culture.

The Poverty Point culture developed a tradition of making high-quality, stylized, carved and polished miniature stone beads. Other early cultures in eastern North America rarely used stone to make their beads, opting for softer materials such as shell or bone. The beads depict animals common to the Poverty Point culture's environment, such as owls, dogs, locusts, and turkey vultures.

== See also ==
- Archaeological periods of the Mississippi Valley
