= Clarence Hungerford Webb =

American medical doctor and archaeologist

Clarence H. Webb (August 25, 1902 – January 18, 1991) was an American medical doctor and archaeologist who conducted extensive research on prehistoric sites in the southeastern United States. A pediatrician by profession, he became interested in archaeology on a camping trip with his sons, where he found some small, triangular points. His archaeological research and publications included the study of Caddoan culture, and at several major sites such as Poverty Point and Belcher Mound in Louisiana.

== Early life ==
Webb was born August 25, 1902 near Shreveport, Louisiana. His parents were Frederick and Annie Lou Hungerford Webb Growing up in a rural area, he spent his early life working on family farms in Bayou Pierre in DeSoto and Caddo Parishes. In 1919, he graduated valedictorian from Shreveport High.

In 1923, he received his undergraduate degree from Tulane University and a medical degree in 1925. He participated in sports and was a member of Beta Theta Pi, the Nu Sigma Nu medical honor fraternity, Alpha Omega Alpha, and Stars and Bars. He received a master's degree in pediatrics from the University of Chicago.

== Medical career ==
Webb practiced medicine in Texas, Minnesota, and Illinois from 1929 until 1931 when he received his Master's in Pediatrics from the University of Chicago. After receiving his Master's, Webb moved his family to Shreveport and co-founded the first Well Baby Clinic in the Shreveport Public Health Department. This clinic served the area for fifty years, and Webb remained there until his retirement in 1976. He held teaching positions at four universities and served on the staff at six hospitals.

== Archaeology ==
Webb's interest in archaeology did not occur until 1934 when he accompanied his sons on a Boy Scout trip near Mena, Arkansas. According to friends, this day changed his life. Webb began studying reports and techniques of well-known archaeologists such as James A. Ford. His next move was to contact Edward Neild and Michael Beckman, two Shreveport collectors who became lifelong friends of Webb. In 1935, Webb traveled to Poverty Point and uncovered a cache of about 1,500 stone vessel fragments, which was the first of many visits to the site, either surface collecting or conducting excavations. Even though his first large-scale excavation project was some years in the future, salvage archaeology was occurring in the south during this time under the auspices of New Deal labor relief programs. One of the sites examined was at Marksville, Louisiana, where the project archaeologists, Frank Setzler, aided by James Ford, became Webb's mentors.

Over the next few years, Webb worked on many sites and met well-known archaeologists like Arden R. King, Robert Stuart Neitzel, Edwin Doran, Carlyle Smith, and William Malloy. James Ford and Edwin Doran's interest in the stratigraphic occurrence of potsherds in middens probably influenced Webb's interest in cultural chronology and site descriptions, especially at Poverty Point. In the 1930s, Webb met James B. Griffin, who assisted him in pottery classification. During the same time, the University of Oklahoma began its archaeological program, and Webb made friends with Robert Bell, David Baerreis, and Kenneth Orr. Webb also met Alex Krieger on an excavation in Texas, and the two collaborated on several projects over their careers. Later in the 1930s, Webb began to conduct his excavations, with the field most notably at Poverty Point and the Gahagan Mounds. He conducted projects regularly over the next thirty years. During his work at Poverty Point, Webb created an extensive and well-documented surface collection from the site.

By 1940, he was a charter member of the Society for American Archaeology and joined the Texas Archaeological Society, where he attended annual meetings and participated in paper presentations. Webb organized the first Caddo Conference in 1942, which continues to meet for the study of Caddo culture. His contributions to the understanding of Poverty Point through the early 1980s allowed him to play a major role in the federal and state recognition of the site.

When the Louisiana State Archaeological Society was reactivated in 1970, Webb was chosen as its first president because of his previous contributions to the archaeological societies of Texas, Arkansas, Oklahoma, and Mississippi. In 1974, in Louisiana, an office for State Archaeologist was established, and Webb was the first to be asked to serve on its Archaeological Survey and Antiquities Commission. He served as chairman until he died in 1991.

=== Key excavations ===
Webb did extensive archaeological work in Louisiana and adjoining areas, where the prehistory record was replete with pottery-making and mound-building cultures. This was partly because northern Louisiana's fertile land was suitable for agricultural purposes. Early in his career Webb concluded there was evidence for a fleeting Folsom-Yuma (Clovis) horizon in the state, and he later excavated the later Paleoindian John Pearce site, a San Patrice Site in Caddo Parish, Louisiana.

==== Poverty Point ====
Poverty Point is a Late Archaic period archaeological site located in the lower Mississippi Valley in West Carroll Parish occupied from ca. 1600 to 1000 B.C. It consists of several earthworks and mounds and was created toward the end of the Archaic Period by the Native American Poverty Point culture. Webb conducted extensive work at the site, beginning in the late 1930s and continuing throughout the remainder of his life, writing many papers and generating extensive surface collections of the Late Archaic and Tchefuncte assemblages. Webb's work shed light on the site, which had received minimal study before this due to an absence of major ceramic period occupations. He found zoomorphic locust beads at the site that were made from carved and polished stone, usually red jasper. The beads resembled grasshoppers and cicadas. He proposed that the beads involved an element of magic that spread across the southern states in multicultural contexts. He argued there was no evidence for cultural unity among the sites where the zoomorphic beads appeared.

==== Belcher Mound ====
Because he lived in Shreveport, Webb had long known about the Caddo culture. Located in Caddo Parish, Louisiana, Belcher Mound was excavated by Webb along with some friends and volunteers over five years on weekends. The team spent nearly a decade on the excavation and reporting on this mound. Webb concluded the site represented the ceremonial and possible civil center of a small agricultural community located in the Red River Valley. It was part of the Caddoan culture, people who were primarily farmers, but also fished, hunted, and gathered. They built mounds which were used for ceremonies and contained burials. He noted major changes in house types, construction and usage, pottery, burial customs, some of the tools, ornamentation, and ceremonial tools and customs. They may have hunted using the bow and arrow with small stone points, used small triangular scrapers to scrape hides, and bone tools and ornaments were preferred over shell. Burials were found with ornaments that suggested hereditary social ranking. The center of Caddoan occupation during contact times and throughout their prehistoric development was along Red River, with extensions to other river valleys in the four state area of northern Louisiana, southwestern Arkansas, eastern Texas, and eastern Oklahoma. They maintained trade and cultural contacts with the lower Mississippi Valley tribes of eastern and southern Louisiana for many centuries.

=== Other excavations ===
Other than Poverty Point and Belcher Mounds, Webb initiated or completed excavations at the Gahagan site, the Mounds Plantation site, and the Bellevue Mound between 1935 and 1945. He also conducted excavations and several smaller Caddoan sites along the Red River and its tributaries. Webb also did work on the San Patrice Culture in the Southeast. Around and slightly before 8,000 B.C., artifacts of the Dalton and San Patrice cultures were common in the Southeast. There was speculation that the ancient ancestors of the Caddo-speaking peoples came from among the San Patrice rather than the Dalton peoples, based on the geographic distribution of these early points. These cultures are considered by many archeologists to be among the first of many Archaic cultures in the Southeastern United States. Webb conducted excavations at the John Pearce site with Joel Shiner and Wayne Roberts, which further defined the lithic assemblages found at this San Patrice culture site. It is still to be determined whether or not these points represent separate Clovis and San Patrice components. Webb further defined the San Patrice assemblages as a socio-cultural unit that was similar to Plains Paleoindian, but transitional to Early Archaic.

== Awards ==
Webb received numerous awards during his archaeological and medical careers:

- 1960: honorary LL. D. degree from Centenary College of Shreveport.
- 1962: President of American Academy of Pediatrics.
- 1965: Grulee Award from the American Academy of Pediatrics.
- 1977: first James R. Ford Award for “outstanding contributions in Louisiana archaeology.”
- 1985: first Crabtree Award from the Society of American Archaeology. (This award represents the highest distinction to persons without formal archaeological training who made major contributions to the field).
- 1987: for his numerous accomplishments, the Daughters of the American Revolution chose him as one of the “Outstanding Men in America.”

The Louisiana State University Medical School created an award, in his name, for the Outstanding Clinical Instructor of the Year.

== Personal life ==
Webb married Dorothy Dodd, daughter of Reverend Monroe E. Dodd, pastor of First Baptist Church, in 1926. They had two sons, Clarence Jr. and Elmon Dodd. Webb served on the city of Shreveport commission that wrote the city's charter.

Webb died January 18, 1991, in Shreveport, Louisiana, at eighty-nine years of age.

== Selected publications ==
- "Pottery Types from the Belcher Mound Site". with Monroe Dodd Jr. Bulletin of the Texas Archeological and Paleontological Society, vol. 13 and 14, (1941–42), pp. 88–116.
- "The Bellevue Mound: A Pre-Caddoan Site in Bossier Parish, Louisiana". Bulletin of the Texas Archeological Society, vol. 24 (1953). pp. 18–42.
- Poverty Point: A Late Archaic Site in Louisiana. Anthropological Papers of the American Museum of Natural History, vol. 45, pt. 1 (1956).
- The Belcher Mound: A Stratified Caddoan Site in Parish, Louisiana. American Antiquity, vol. 24, no. 4, pt. 2 (April 1959).
- Teoc Creek: A Poverty Point Site in Carroll County, Mississippi. with John M. Connaway and Samuel O. McGahey. Jackson, Mississippi: Mississippi Department of Archives and History, 1977.
- The Caddo Indians of Louisiana, with Hiram F. Gregory. Louisiana Archaeological Survey and Antiquities Commission Anthropological Study, no. 2 (August 1978).
- The Poverty Point Culture. Geoscience and Man, vol. 17 (1982). Louisiana State University.
- Stone Points and Tools of Northwestern Louisiana. Special Publications of the Louisiana Archaeological Society, no. 1, 2nd edition (January 2000).
