= Poverty Point =

Prehistoric site in Louisiana, US

Poverty Point National Monument
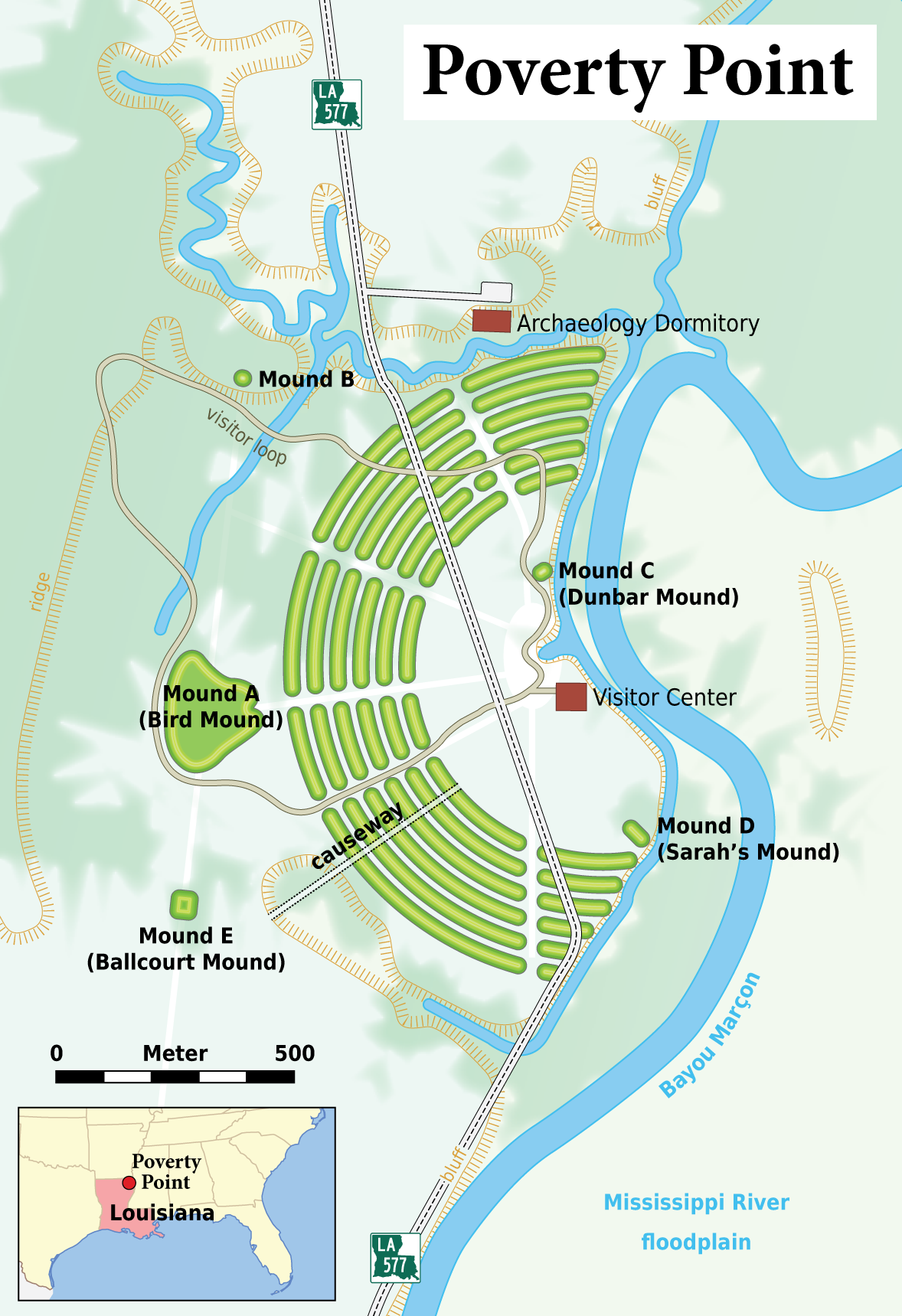
- A map of the Poverty Point site

- Location within Louisiana Location within the United States
- Interactive map of Poverty Point National Monument
- Location: West Carroll Parish, Louisiana, U.S.
- Nearest city: Epps, Louisiana
- Coordinates: 32°38′12″N 91°24′41″W
- Area: 910.85 acres (368.61 ha)
- Authorized: October 31, 1988
- Governing body: Louisiana Office of State Parks
- Website: Poverty Point National Monument

UNESCO World Heritage Site
- Official name: Monumental Earthworks of Poverty Point
- Type: Cultural
- Criteria: iii
- Designated: 2014 (38th session)
- Reference no.: 1435
- Region: Europe and North America

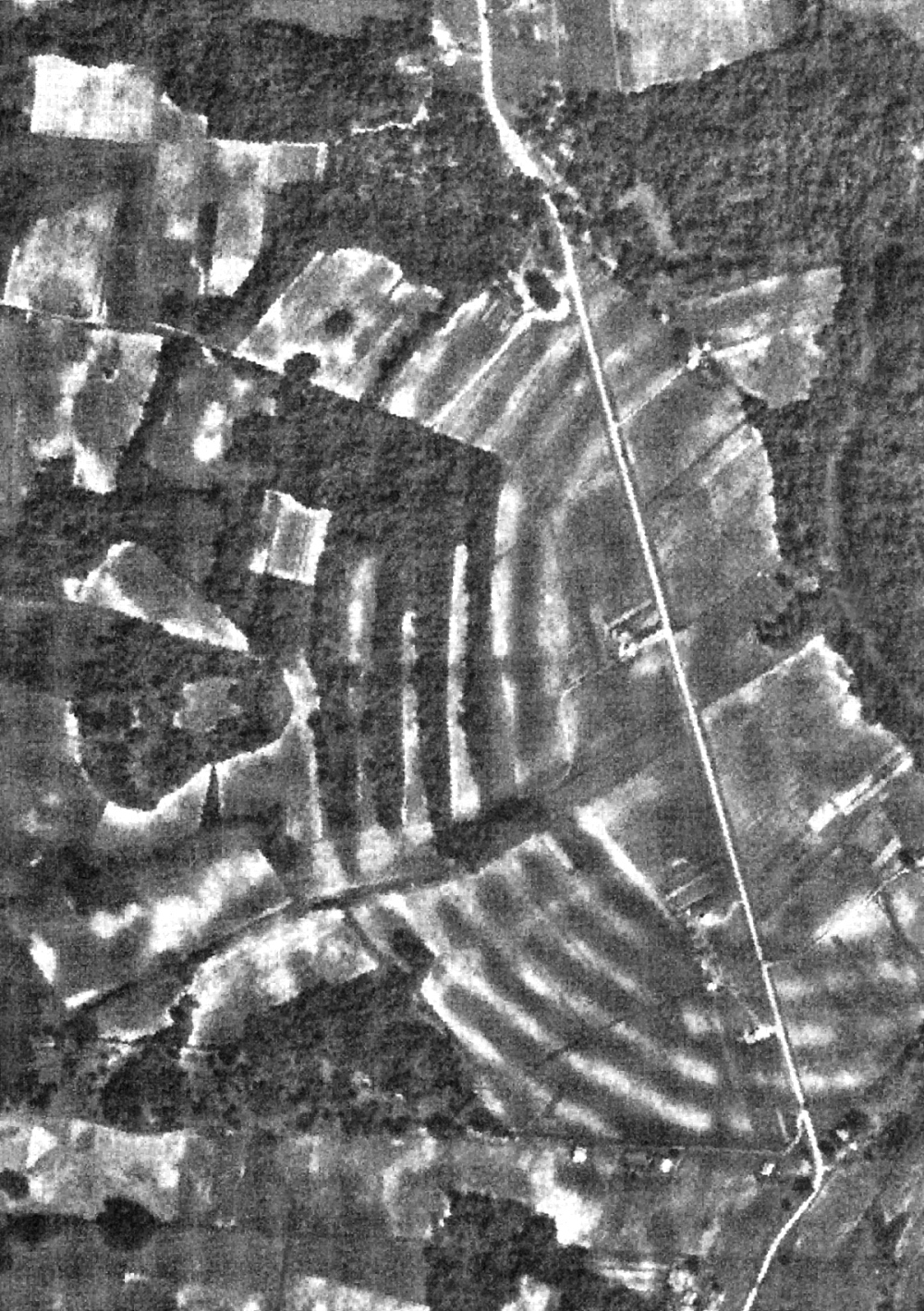
Poverty Point 1938 aerial retouched

Poverty Point State Historic Site/Poverty Point National Monument (French: Pointe de Pauvreté; 16 WC 5) is a prehistoric earthwork constructed by the Poverty Point culture, located in present-day northeastern Louisiana. Evidence of the Poverty Point culture extends throughout much of the Southeastern Woodlands of the Southern United States. The culture extended more than 100 miles (160 km) laterally across the Mississippi Delta and an even greater distance southward to the Gulf Coast, with related or satellite cultures found further afield.

The Poverty Point site has been designated as a state historic site, U.S. National Monument, a U.S. National Historic Landmark, and UNESCO World Heritage Site. The site is 15.5 miles (24.9 km) from the current flow of the Mississippi River, and is situated on the edge of Macon Ridge. The village of Epps developed in the historic period in West Carroll Parish, Louisiana.

The Poverty Point site contains earthen ridges and mounds, built by indigenous people between 1700 and 1100 BCE during the Late Archaic period in North America. Archaeologists have proposed a variety of possible functions for the site, including as a settlement, a trading center, and/or a ceremonial religious complex.

The 402-acre (163 ha) property now operated as the Poverty Point State Historic Site contains "the largest and most complex Late Archaic earthwork occupation and ceremonial site yet found in North America". Euroamericans described the site in the 19th century. Since the 1950s Poverty Point has been the focus of professional archaeological excavations. The earthworks are named after Poverty Point Plantation, a 19th-century slave plantation on the property.

== Site description ==
The monumental earthworks of Poverty Point consist of a series of earthen ridges, earthen mounds, and a central plaza. The earthworks core of the site measures about 345 acres (140 ha), although archaeological investigations have shown that the total occupation area extended for more than three miles (5 km) along the Bayou Macon. The earthworks include six concentric, C-shaped ridges that extend to the edge of the Macon Ridge and several mounds outside and inside of the earthen ridges. These concentric ridges are unique to Poverty Point.

=== Six C-shaped ridges ===
The main part of the monument is the six concentric C-shaped ridges. Each ridge is separated from the next by a swale or gulley. The ridges are divided by four aisles forming earthwork sectors. Three additional linear ridges or causeways connect earthen features in the southern half of the ridges. Today the ridges vary from 0.3 to 6 ft (10 –185 cm) in height relative to the adjacent swales. Archaeologists believe they were once higher in places, but have been worn down through roughly 150 years of agricultural plowing. The slightly rounded crest of each ridge varies from 50 – 80 ft (15–25 m) in width. The width of the intervening swales is 65 – 100 ft (20 – 30 m). The approximate diameter of the outside ridge is three-quarters of a mile (1.2 km), while the innermost ridge's diameter is about three-eighths of a mile (0.6 km). The scale of the ridges is so massive that it wasn't until researchers examined aerial photographs that they were able to recognize the geometric design. Radiocarbon dates suggest that most of the ridges were constructed between 1600 and 1300 BCE.

=== Plaza ===
Enclosed by the innermost concentric ridge and the eastern edge of Macon Ridge is a large, 37.5-acre (17.4 ha), plaza. Although the plaza appears to be a naturally flat area, it has been modified extensively. In addition to filled gullies, archaeologists found that soil was added to raise the level of the ground surface in some areas by as much as 3.3 ft (1 m). In the 1970s, excavations revealed evidence of huge wooden posts in the western plaza. Later geophysical survey identified several complex circular magnetic features, ranging from about 82 ft (25 m) to 206 ft (63 m) in diameter, in the southern half of the plaza. Based on the geophysical data, archaeologists with the University of Louisiana at Monroe and Mississippi State University undertook targeted excavations of some of the circular magnetic features; they found large post pits, indicating the magnetic circles were rings of wood posts. Radiocarbon dates from the post pit fill and from overlying features indicate the post circles were part of the landscape built by Native Americans, even as the earthworks were under construction.

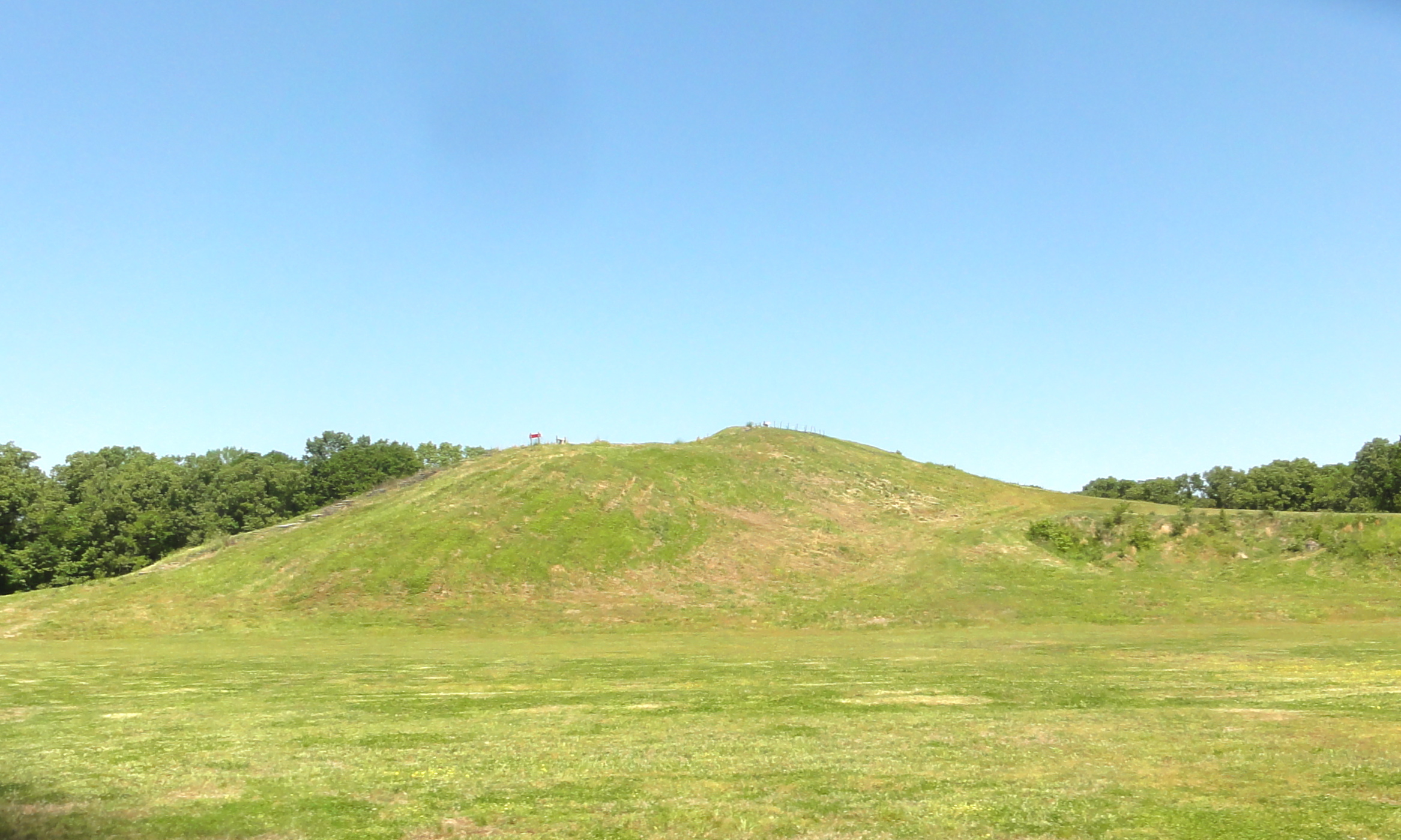
Mound A at Poverty Point

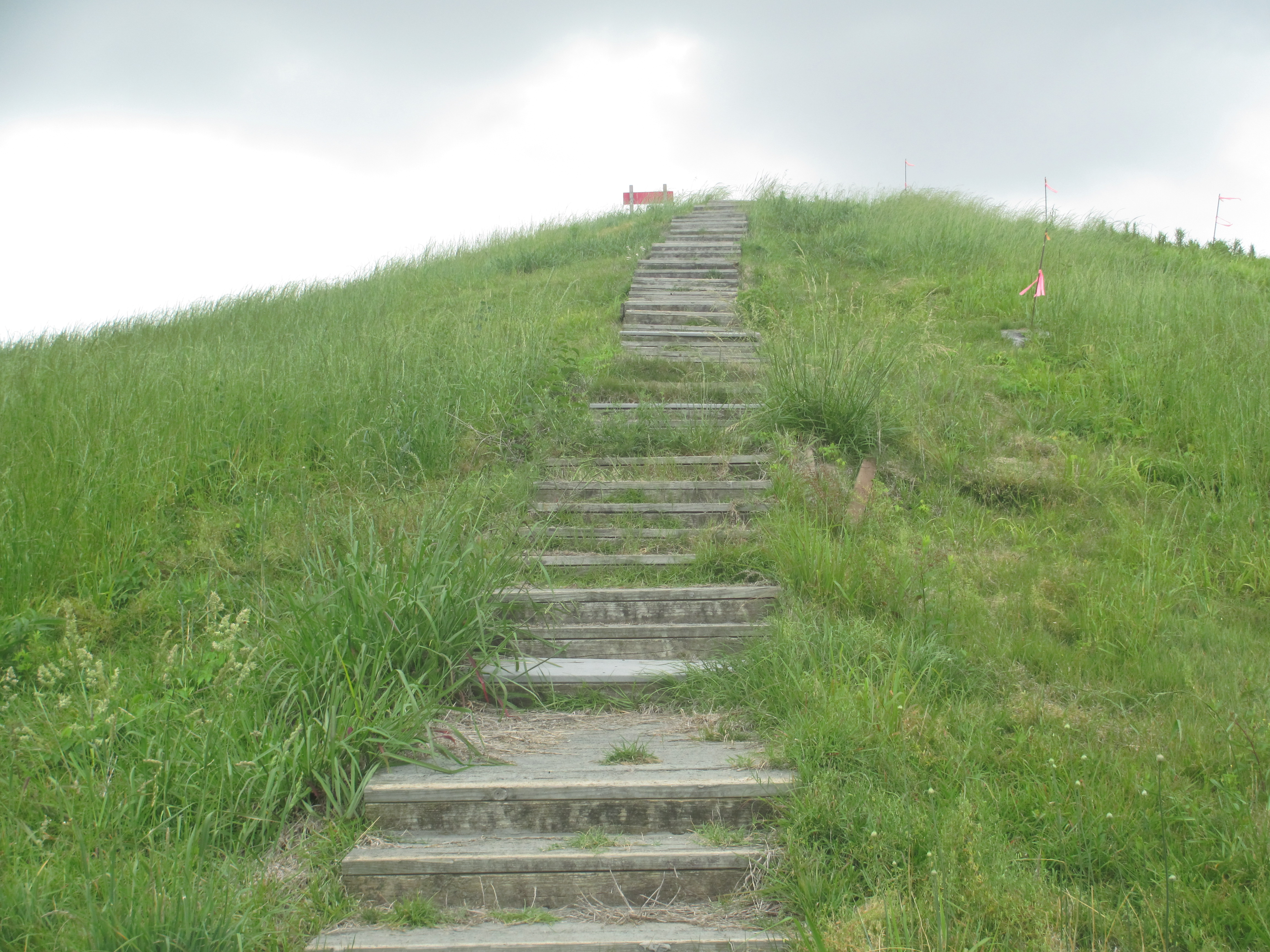
Steps (since removed) to top of Mound A

=== Mound A ===
The earthen mounds are the most visible earthworks at the site. The largest of these, Mound A, is 72 ft (22 m) tall at its highest point and about 705 x 660 ft (215 x 200 m) at its base. Mound A is located to the west of the ridges, and is roughly T-shaped when viewed from above. Some have interpreted Mound A as being in the shape of a bird or as an "Earth island" representing the cosmological center of the site.

Researchers have learned that Mound A was constructed quickly, probably over a period of less than three months. Prior to construction, the vegetation covering the area of Mound A was burned. According to radiocarbon analysis, this burning occurred between 1450 and 1250 BCE. The prehistoric builders immediately covered the burnt area with a layer of silt, followed quickly by the main construction effort. There are no signs of construction phases or weathering of the mound fill even at microscopic levels, indicating that construction proceeded in a single massive effort over a short period. In total volume, Mound A is made up of approximately 8,400,000 cubic feet (238,000 cubic meters) of fill, making it the second-largest earthen mound (by volume) in eastern North America. It is second in overall size to the later Mississippian-culture Monks Mound at Cahokia, built beginning about 950-1000 CE in present-day Illinois near the Mississippi River.

Shallow borrow pits are located near Mound A. Presumably the Poverty Point people carried dirt from those borrow pits and from elsewhere on the site to build the mound.

=== Mound B ===
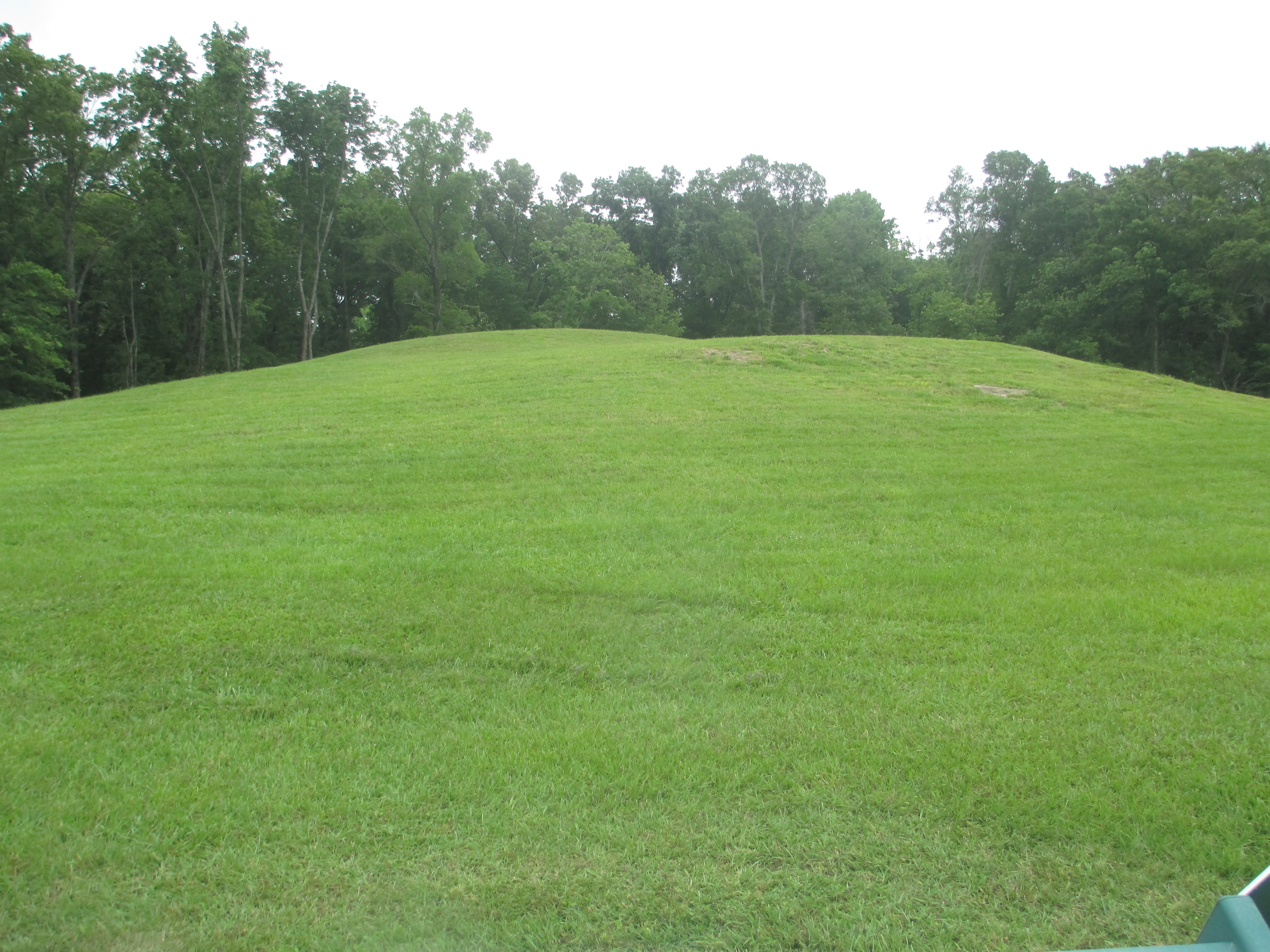
Mound B field

Mound B is located north and west of the six concentric ridges and 2050 ft (625 m) north of Mound A. The mound is roughly conical in form and is approximately 21 ft (6.5 m) in height with a 180 ft (55 m) basal diameter. Dating to sometime after 1700 BCE, Mound B was the first earthwork built at Poverty Point. Built in several stages, charcoal, fire pits, and possible postmolds were found at various levels within the mound. The impressions of woven baskets were preserved in the fill of an upper level of the mound construction. The final stage of the mound construction was a conical silt loam lens that covered the entire mound surface. During excavations in the mid-1950s, a human bone was reported within an ash lens at the base of the mound. At the time, this finding was reported as evidence of a cremation. However, recent research failed to find any evidence of the ash lens. Researchers suggest instead the reported lens represents a fine gray silt common to E horizon soils on the Macon Ridge and often found beneath mounds. The identification of the bone (reported as the proximal end of an infant's femur) has also been disputed and is not curated in any known collection from the site.

=== Mound C ===
Mound C is located inside the plaza area near the eastern edge of Macon Ridge. Mound C is 6.5 ft (2 m) in height, about 260 ft (80 m) long, and today is 80 ft (25 m) wide. The width is truncated by erosion along the eastern edge. There is a depression that divides the mound, which is thought to have been created by a 19th-century wagon road which proceeded northward to the old town of Floyd, Louisiana. Multiple radiocarbon dates for Mound C bracket the entire occupation of the site, but one radiocarbon test result from beneath the base of the mound suggests Mound C is one of the earliest constructions at the site. Mound C is composed of several thin layers of distinct soils with small amounts of accumulated debris, or midden, between them, indicating they were added over time. The uppermost level gave the mound its final dome shape.

=== Mound D ===
Mound D is a rectangular earthwork having a flat summit that today contains a historic cemetery associated with the Poverty Point Plantation. This mound is about 4 ft (1.2 m) tall and 100 x 130 ft (30 x 40 m) at its base and is situated on one of the concentric ridges. Several lines of evidence suggest that Mound D was built, at least in part, by the Coles Creek culture nearly 2000 years after the Poverty Point culture occupation of the site. First, Coles Creek culture ceramics were recovered near Mound D. Second, Coles Creek culture ceramics were recovered 40 cm below the ground surface near Mound D. Third, optically stimulated luminescence analyses on soils beneath and within the mound, which determine the date the soils were last exposed to sunlight, are consistent with a Coles Creek culture mound constructed on top of a Poverty Point ridge. The mound is also known as Sarah's Mound because Sarah Guier was buried in the mound.

=== Mound E ===
Mound E is sometimes referred to as the Ballcourt Mound. The Ballcourt designation comes from "two shallow depressions on its flattened top which reminded some archaeologists of playing areas in front of outdoor basketball goals, not because of any suggestion of actual activities at Poverty Point."

Mound E is located 1330 ft (405 m) south of Mound A and is a rectangular flat-topped structure with rounded corners and a ramp extending from the northeast corner. Mound E is 13.4 ft (4 m) in height and 360 x 295 ft (110 x 90 m) at its base. The profile of an excavation unit on the edge of Mound E revealed five construction stages that were corroborated by series of soil cores recovered across the mound surface. No features were recorded in the excavations and only a small number of artifacts were recovered. Several of the recovered artifacts were of nonlocal chert, such as novaculite, characteristic of the Poverty Point site raw material assemblage. Until recently, dating of Mound E relied on a similarity with the construction of Mound B and their relatively similar soil development. In 2017, a small piece of charcoal was recovered in a soil core taken from the base of the mound ramp. This charcoal, from the base of the mound, provided a radiocarbon date suggesting construction sometime after 1500 BCE.

=== Mound F ===
A sixth mound was discovered at Poverty Point in 2013. Known as Mound F, it is located outside and to the northeast of the concentric ridges. Mound F is about 5 ft (1.5 m) tall and 80 x 100 ft (24 by 30 m) at its base. A radiocarbon date on charred wood from the mound base indicates it was built sometime after ca 1280 BCE, making it the last Archaic mound added to Poverty Point.

=== Lower Jackson and Motley mounds ===
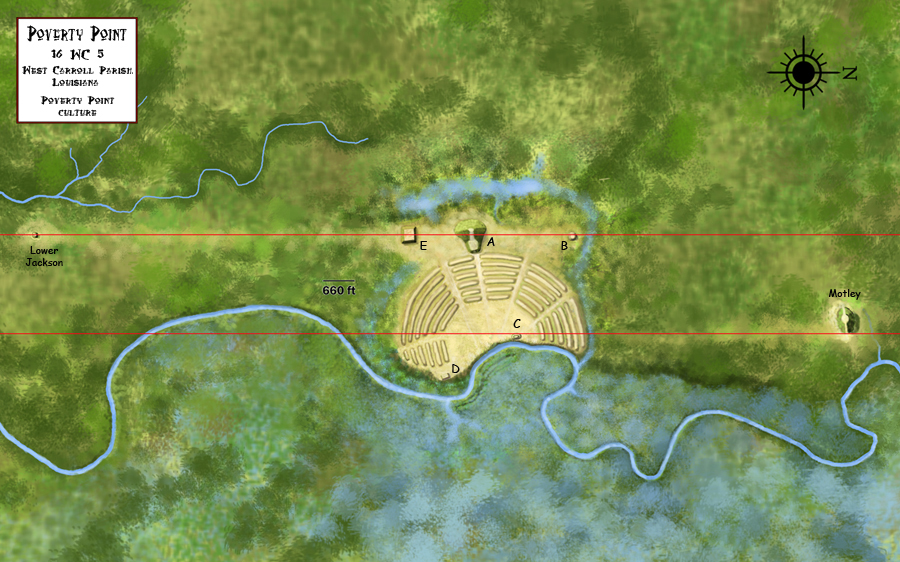
An overview of the Poverty Point site showing the locations of the nearby Motley and Lower Jackson mounds. Note North is to the right.

Approximately 1.8 miles (2.9 km) south of the Poverty Point site center is the Lower Jackson Mound (16WC10) a conical structure 10 ft (3 m) in height and 115 ft (35 m) in diameter at its base. For many years, archaeologists believed the Lower Jackson Mound was built during the same time as the Poverty Point site. However, modern radiocarbon dates from the base of the Mound demonstrate that the Lower Jackson Mound was built ca. 3900 to 3600 BC which predates the Poverty Point earthworks by about 1500 years. Artifacts typical of the early date, such as baked loess blocks and Evans projectile points, were recovered near the mound. Lower Jackson Mound is on the same north–south line as the later Poverty Point Mounds E, A, and B.

Approximately 1.2 miles (2.2 km) to the north of the Poverty Point earthworks is the Motley Mound (16WC7), which is 52 ft (16 m) in height with a base that measures 560 x 410 ft (170 x 125 m). Motley Mound has some similarity in form to Mound A, however, the cultural affiliation of this earthwork remains speculative.

== History ==
=== Construction ===
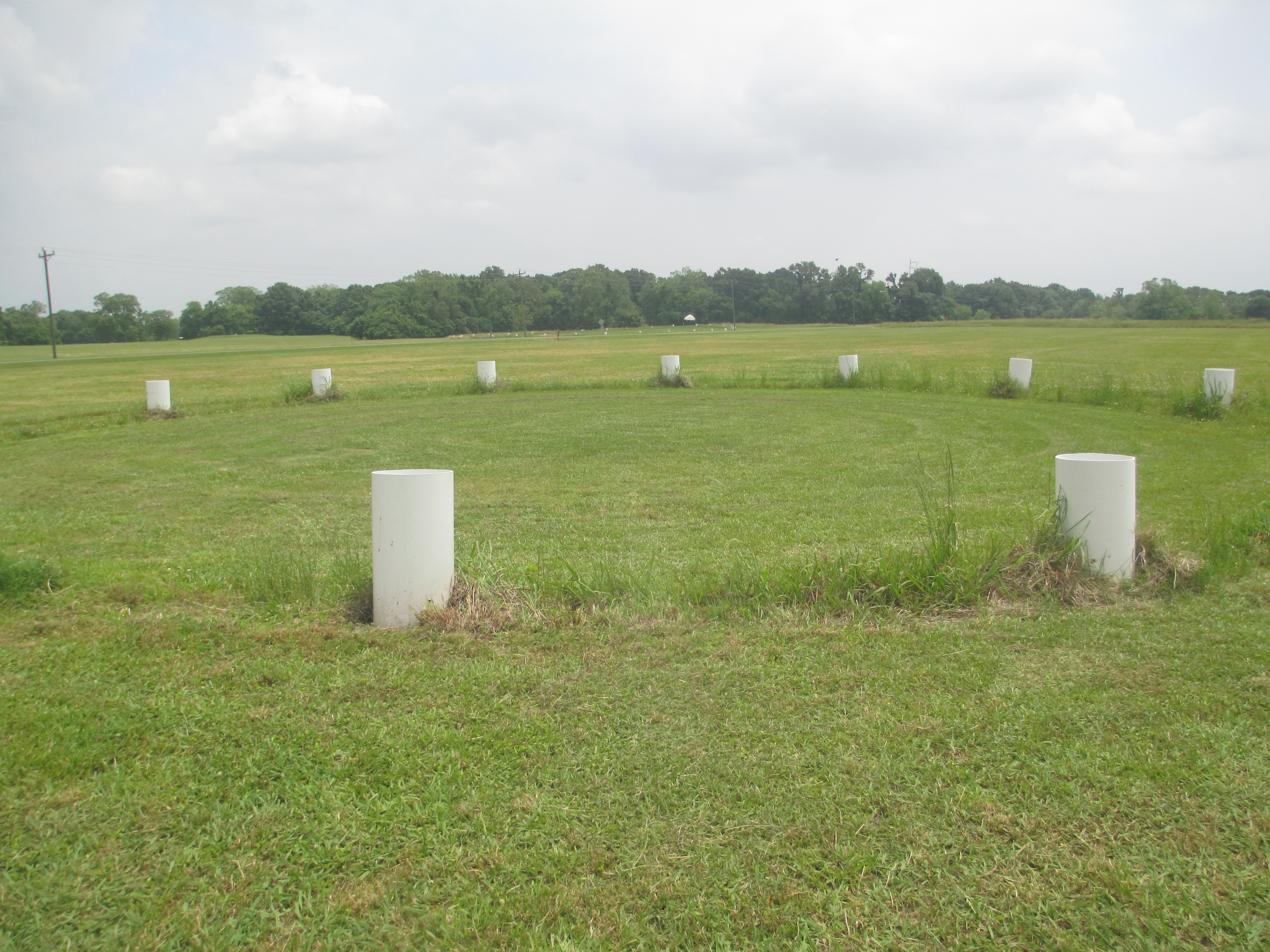
Barrels outline circular structures in the 37.5-acre (17.4 ha) plaza at Poverty Point

Poverty Point was not constructed all at once. The final form appears to have been the product of successive generations over a considerable period of time. The exact sequence and timeframe of earthwork construction is not precisely known. Radiocarbon dating of the site has produced a wide variety of results, but recent syntheses suggest earthwork construction began as early as 1800 BCE and continued until as late as 1200 BCE.

Archaeological excavations determined that prior to the construction of the earthworks, prehistoric workers leveled the land around the site and filled in gullies and other low places to create the flat central plaza and surfaces on which to build the mounds and ridges. The main building material was loess, a type of silt loam soil which is easy to dig but erodes when exposed to water. For this reason, clay may have been used to cap the loess constructions to protect the surfaces from erosion. The earthworks were constructed by dumping basket loads of dirt in piles and then filling in the gaps between them. The baskets, depending on the size of the bearer, could hold between 30–50 lb (13.6–22.7 kg) of dirt, suggesting that men, women, and children participated in the construction.

The number of individuals involved in the construction of Poverty Point is unknown, although archaeologist Jon L. Gibson provides multiple scenarios for how long it would have taken to build the earthwork depending on the number and intensity of individual efforts. For example, he estimated that the earthwork could have been produced in a century by three generations if one hundred individuals spent six or seven days a month on the construction project. Gibson also suggests that workers lived on-site during construction, possibly setting up temporary homes on top of the very earthworks that they were building. Most archaeological excavations of the ridges at Poverty Point consist of small 3.3 ft × 3.3 ft (1 m × 1 m) units that cannot reveal the extent of an entire household. An exception is the 1980–1982 Louisiana State University excavations that explored a 16 ft × 98 ft (4.9 m × 29.9 m) trench placed on the Northwest Ridge 1. The trench excavation revealed multiple sequential levels of domestic activity over time. Archaeologists have interpreted this zone as possible evidence for more long-term habitation of the site.

Changes in temperature, precipitation, and increased flooding, may have caused an ecological imbalance that led to the abandonment of Poverty Point. Archeologists use this change as a time boundary between the Archaic and later Woodland periods.

=== Purposes ===
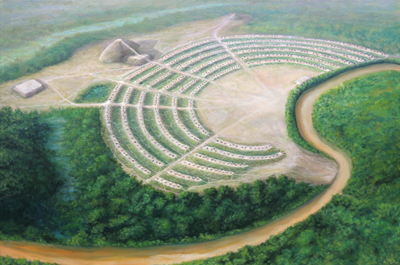
Artist's conception of the completely constructed site.

Archaeologists have long debated the functions of the Poverty Point site. One of the main questions has been whether it was used for a settlement or only for periodic events. Archaeologists postulate that houses were constructed on top of the concentric ridges. Postholes along with hearths and earth ovens have been found on the ridges, indicating the presence of buildings and associated activities. Other archaeologists believe that regular residence would have produced more postholes. Gibson and others note the postholes could have been destroyed by the historic plowing that took place on much of the site and also note the limited excavations that would reveal posthole patterns of houses.

Archaeologists such as Sherwood Gagliano and Edwin Jackson support the interpretation that Poverty Point was a site where groups came to meet and trade on an occasional basis. Gibson believes there is evidence of too much rubbish left by original inhabitants for only occasional habitation, and that it would be implausible to build such a massive earthwork for use only as a trading center.

Some archaeologists interpret Poverty Point as having religious symbolism and importance. Archaeologist William Haag, who excavated at the site in the 1970s, interpreted the aisles that divide the ridge sectors as having astronomical significance aligned to the solstices. Astronomer Robert Purrington believes the ridges at Poverty Point were geometrically, rather than astronomically, aligned. The discrepancy between Haag and Purrington's conclusions stems from having chosen different centers for the site, leading to different angles for the aisles. Researchers have also studied historic and contemporary Native American religious beliefs for parallels. Gibson believes that the ridges were built with their arcs against the west to keep malevolent spirits of evil and death out of the complex.

=== Poverty Point people ===
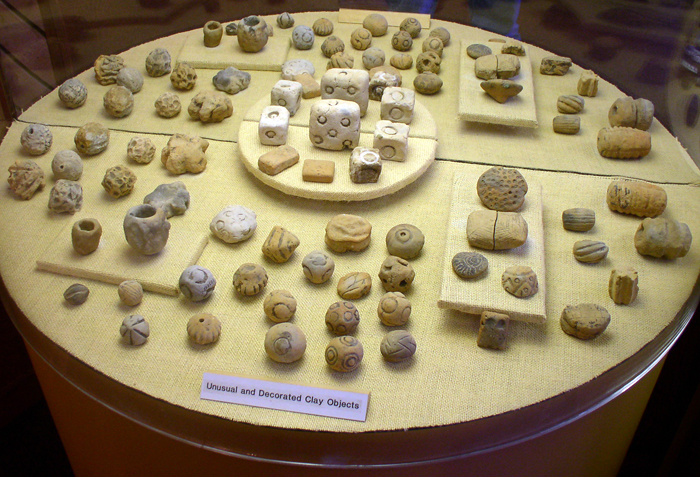
Decorative objects formed from loess soil, then fired, found at the Poverty Point site

The people of the Poverty Point culture who constructed the earthworks were hunter-fisher-gatherers rather than agriculturalists. They are an example of a complex hunter-gatherer society that constructed large-scale monuments. The vast majority of other prehistoric monuments, ranging from Stonehenge in England to Khufu's Great Pyramid at Giza in Egypt, were constructed by agricultural societies, in which crop surpluses allowed greater density of population and stratification of society.

The people who lived at Poverty Point were Native Americans, descendants of the immigrants who possibly came to North America across the Bering Strait land bridge approximately 20,000 to 23,000 years ago. The people identified with the Poverty Point culture developed a distinct set of cultural traits different from other contemporary inhabitants in the Lower Mississippi Valley. Time, cultural change, and the lack of written records prevent researchers from identifying the people of Poverty Point as ancestors to any specific historic or modern tribe.

The food sources of the people at Poverty Point came from the local animals and plant life in the region. The Poverty Point people's food was acquired through fishing, gathering, and hunting. Poverty Point subsistence was broad-based due to the different seasonal foods that were available. Their diet consisted of large mammals like deer, small mammals like possum, various fish and turtles, mollusks, nuts, fruits, berries, and aquatic roots.

==== Artifacts ====
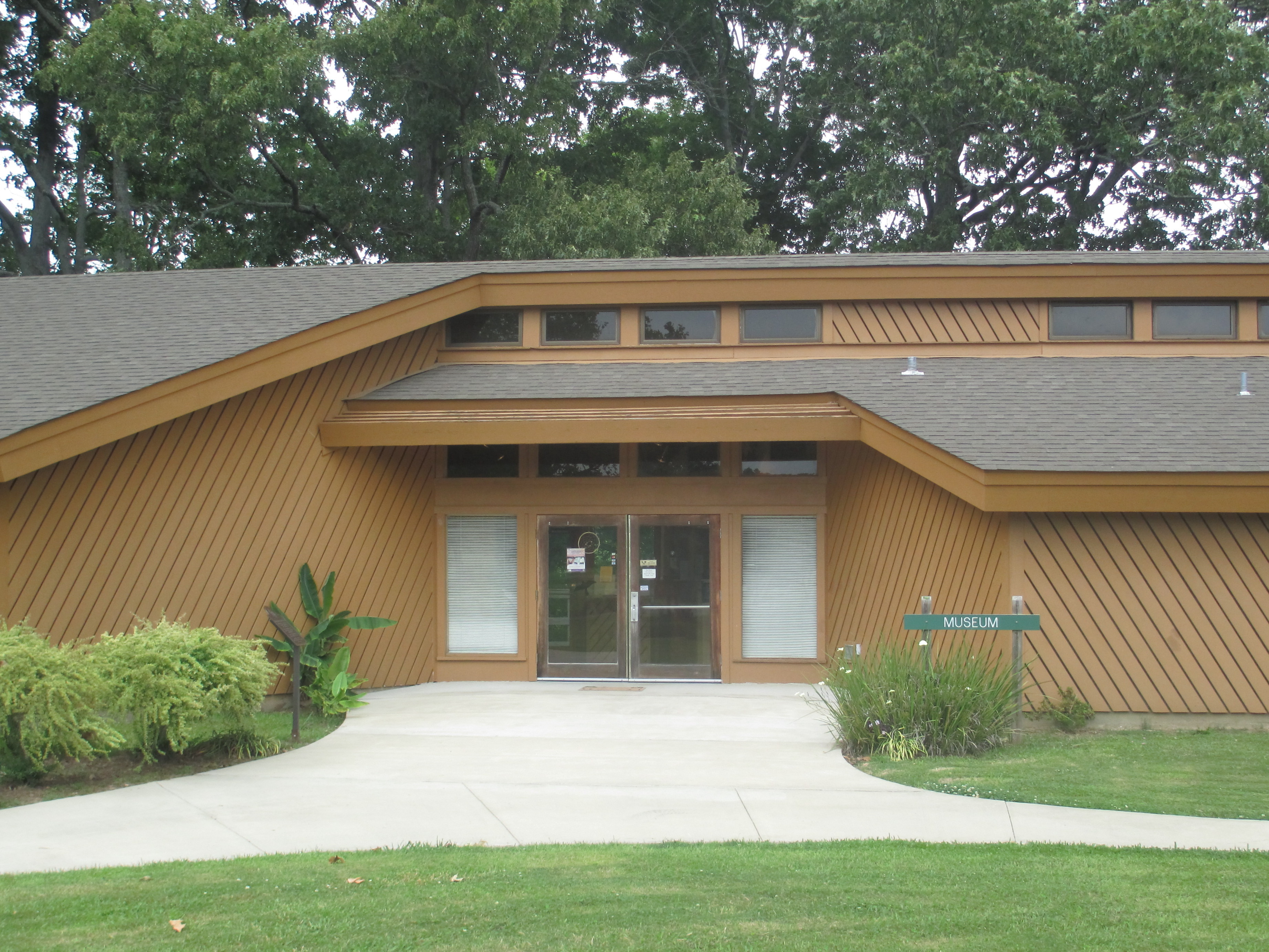
Museum at Poverty Point

The vast majority of artifacts recovered at Poverty Point are small, baked shapes made of loess, found in a wide variety of forms and referred to as "Poverty Point Objects" or PPOs. Except for unique specialized forms, archaeologists generally conclude the fired earth objects were used in cooking, based on the artifacts recovery context and supported by experimental archaeology. When placed in earth ovens, the objects were shown to hold heat and aid in cooking food.

The inhabitants of Poverty Point produced small amounts of pottery, creating a variety of different types such as fiber-tempered, grog-tempered, and untempered with both the Wheeler and Old Floyd Tchefuncte design styles as decoration. More commonly, however, they imported stone vessels from other peoples, made of steatite from the foothills of the Appalachian Mountains.

Most of the Poverty Point tools appear to have been made on-site, as there is evidence of debris from their manufacturing process found across the ridges. An analysis of artifacts recovered from the ridges demonstrates that individual ridges and sectors of the earthwork complex were used for specialized activities. For example, based on the analysis of projectile points and production debris, the north sector of the earthwork was the favored location for manufacturing tools and the South sectors were the location where the manufactured projectile points were used as tools. Beads, pendants and other lapidary items were recovered primarily in the West sector. However, clay figurines are evenly distributed throughout the ridge system. Based on the analysis of artifacts recovered from successive strata of ridge construction, there are clear changes in artifact styles through time. For example, cylindrical grooved Poverty Point Objects are the earliest form of the artifact type produced and biconical forms occur later in time.

There is no naturally occurring stone at Poverty Point. Based on the distant geological sources of different kinds of stone used to make lithic artifacts recovered at Poverty Point, archaeologists conclude that the inhabitants were active in trade with other Native Americans. For example, a disproportionate number of projectile points were made from raw materials naturally occurring in the Ouachita and Ozark mountains, and in the Ohio and Tennessee river valleys. Other materials derived from trade included soapstone from the southern Appalachian Mountains of Alabama and Georgia, and galena from Missouri and Iowa. Archaeologists assumed that the presence of copper artifacts indicated trade with copper-producing tribes in the upper Great Lakes region. However, modern scientific analyses demonstrate that at least some of the copper artifacts recovered from Poverty Point were made from materials available in the southern Appalachian Mountains, where soapstone or steatite vessels at Poverty Point are also sourced.

== Discovery, excavation and tourism ==
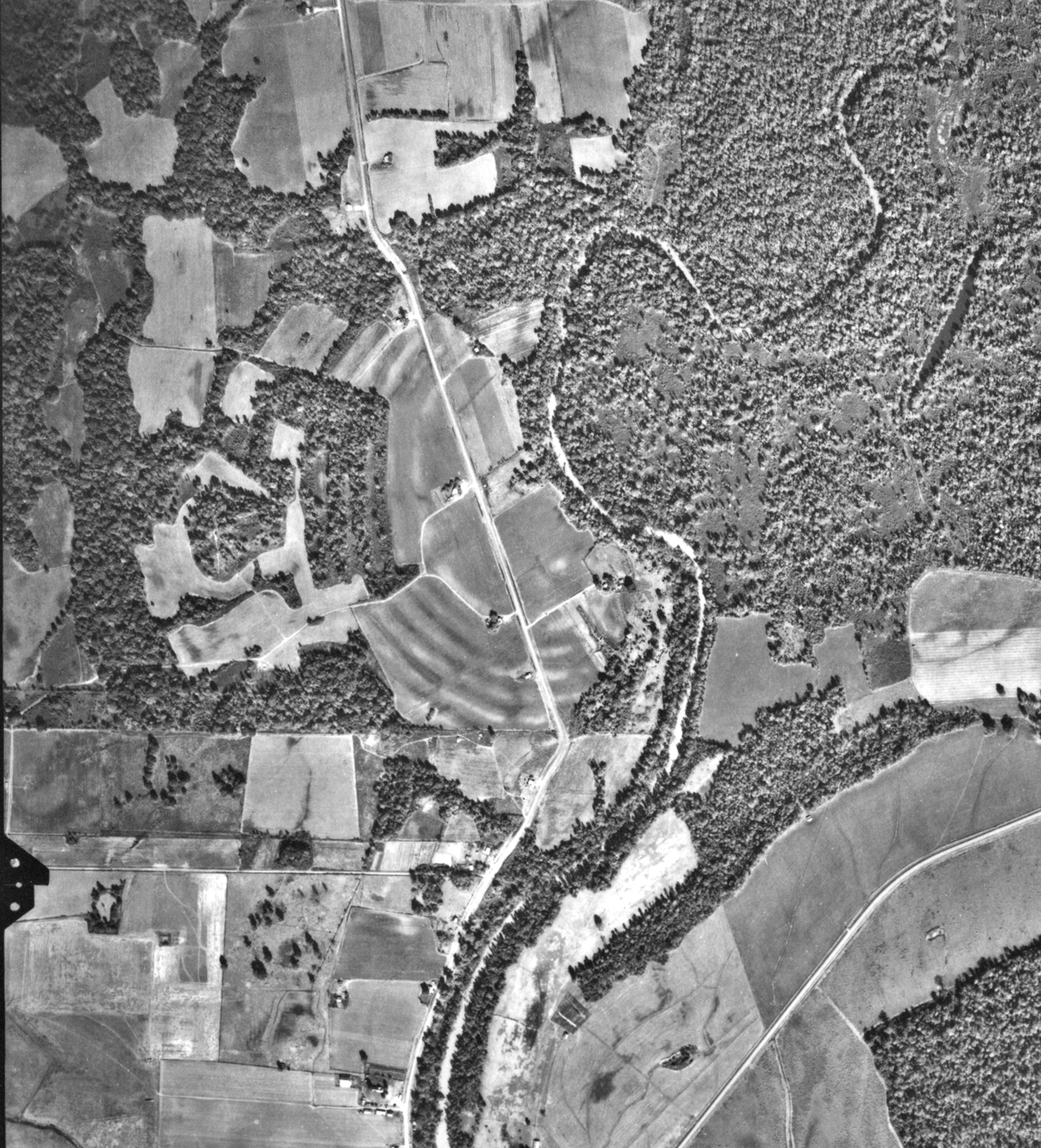
An aerial view of the earthworks at Poverty Point. Excerpt from USDA Agricultural Stabilization and Conservation Service aerial photograph CTK-2BB-125. Aerial photograph taken November 11, 1960.

=== Discovery and archaeological excavation ===
In the 1830s, Jacob Walter, an American explorer searching for lead ore in the area, came across Poverty Point and wrote about it in his diary:

On my arrival at the place of my destination, on bayou Mason at which place I had been informed lead ore had been found. But on examination I soon discovered how the lead ore came to this place. & with this discovery, all hope of finding a lead mine disapate [sic]. Instead of a lead mine, I found myself on the site of an old Indian town. The surface of the earth at this place, for several acres around, were strewed in grate profusion, with fragments of Indian crockery. & a large number clay made by the indians for edible purposes indicating the fact that the inhabitants who located the town were a tribe of clay eating indians. The clay balls (Poverty Point Objects) were the size of a green walnut & had been baked in fire. Thus disappointed in the discovery of a lead mine, I mounted my horse. I rode out to look & see what the country looked like in the vicinity of this old town site. I soon discovered a mound of colossal size (Mound A). The figure of the base of this superstructure was a rectangle twice as long as wide & about 1000 long by 500 broad & 150 feet in altitude with top or terrace, of 20 feet wide & 500 feet long ...

The property was purchased as a farm in 1843 by Philip Guier of Kentucky. He and his wife, Sarah lived on and farmed the property. By 1851, the operation was known as Poverty Point Plantation. The Poverty Point name is believed to have been influenced by a place near the Guier's previous residence in Kentucky. Sarah Guier was buried in Mound D.

The first published account of the site was in 1873 by Samuel Lockett, who served as an officer in the Confederate Army during the American Civil War. During the early 20th century, archaeologists took an interest in the site. Poverty Point was investigated and described by Clarence B. Moore in 1913, by Gerard Fowke of the Smithsonian Institution in 1926, by Clarence H. Webb in 1935, and by Michael Beckman in 1946. Three excavation seasons in 1952, 1953 and 1955 were undertaken by James A. Ford and Clarence Webb, leading to the publication of Poverty Point, a Late Archaic Site in Louisiana in 1956.

Excavations have continued at the site into the 21st century. These research efforts include Sharon Goad's (1980–1982) excavation trench on Northwest Ridge 1, Jon Gibson's (1983–1995) excavations at numerous ridge locations across the site, Glen Greene's (1983–1992) research on soil development and cultural landscaping of the site, and other archaeologists conducting limited site research. In the early 2000s T.R. Kidder and Anthony Ortmann conducted research on various mounds at the site and completed a topographic survey of the Poverty Point site. Michael Hargrave and Berle Clay conducted a large area geophysical survey from 2006 to 2012, using magnetic gradiometry and resistivity to investigate the plaza and ridge system. Since 2006, Rinita Dalan has measured magnetic susceptibility of cores and downed cored holes to understand features identified by the gradiometer surveys as well as the construction of the ridges and plaza. The Louisiana Division of Archaeology established the Station Archaeology Program at Poverty Point in 1996 to oversee, coordinate, and conduct site research. The program remains active and has conducted numerous excavations at the site along with curating and analyzing collections from previous excavations at Poverty Point.

=== Public access and site maintenance ===
In 1960, John Griffin, who at the time was the Southeast Regional Archaeologist for the National Park Service, suggested to the Federal government that Poverty Point be declared and established as a national monument. At first the United States Congress declined to support the protection, fearing the unpopularity of acquiring the land from local landowners. The site was designated as a National Historic Landmark on June 13, 1962.

In 1972, the State of Louisiana purchased a 400-acre (1.6 km^{2}) section of the site. In 1976, the state opened the site to the public as the Poverty Point State Commemorative Area. The state built a museum devoted to interpreting the earthworks and the artifacts uncovered there. In 1988, Congress designated the site as a U.S. national monument.

Poverty Point National Monument is open for visitors daily from 9 a.m. to 5 p.m. except for Thanksgiving, Christmas Day, and New Year's Day. As the site is managed by the Louisiana Office of State Parks, a National Parks pass is not accepted for admission. Louisiana works with the Vicksburg U.S. Army Corps of Engineers division in developing plans for erosion control.

In 2013, Lieutenant Governor Jay Dardenne, the ex officio head of the Louisiana Department of Culture, Recreation and Tourism, requested $750,000 in emergency state funding to limit erosion at Poverty Point. The erosion which threatens the prehistoric earthworks is caused by Harlin Bayou in the northern part of the site. The funding was approved.

=== UNESCO World Heritage Site designation ===
In January 2013, the United States Department of the Interior nominated Poverty Point for inclusion on the UNESCO World Heritage List. State Senator Francis C. Thompson of Delhi in Richland Parish said the matter is not "just a local or even state issue [but] of international importance. The prestige of having a World Heritage Site in our region and state would be of great significance both culturally and economically."

On June 22, 2014, the UNESCO World Heritage Committee inscribed Poverty Point as a World Heritage Site at its meeting in Doha, Qatar. Lieutenant Governor Jay Dardenne sent a two-person delegation to Qatar to assist delegates from the U.S. Departments of the Interior and State in providing information about Poverty Point to the World Heritage Committee as they considered its nomination to the World Heritage List. The designation made Poverty Point the first World Heritage Site in Louisiana and the 22nd in the United States.

== See also ==
- Cahokia – UNESCO-designated mound complex in Illinois
- Effigy Mounds National Monument – Mound complex in Iowa
- Hopewell Ceremonial Earthworks – UNESCO-designated mound complex in Ohio
- LSU Campus Mounds – Mound complex in Louisiana
- Marsden Mounds – Archaeological site in Louisiana, US
- Mound Builders – Pre-Columbian cultures of North America
- Toltec Mounds Archaeological State Park – in Arkansas
- Watson Brake – Archaeological site in Louisiana, US
- List of National Historic Landmarks in Louisiana
- List of national monuments of the United States
- List of World Heritage Sites in the United States
- National Register of Historic Places listings in West Carroll Parish, Louisiana
