= Tchefuncte site =

Archaeological site of the prehistoric Tchefuncte culture

Tchefuncte Site
- Location within Louisiana today
- 30°19′55.56″N 90°1′33.38″W
- Periods: Tchula period
- Cultures: Tchefuncte culture
- Location: Mandeville, St. Tammany Parish, Louisiana; US

History
- Built: 500 BCE
- Abandoned: 1 CE

Site notes
- Architectural style: shell middens
- Tchefuncte Site
- U.S. National Register of Historic Places
- Area: less than one acre
- NRHP reference No.: 00000717
- Added to NRHP: June 22, 2000
- Excavation dates: 1938, 1941, 1986
- Archaeologists: Clarence Johnson, Edwin Doran, Richard Weinstein, Charles Pearson, Dave Davis Civilian Conservation Corps, Coastal Environments, Inc., Tulane University
- Responsible body: State of Louisiana

The Tchefuncte Site (/tʃəˈfʌŋktə/ chə-FUNK-tə; 16ST1) is an archaeological site that is a type site for the prehistoric Tchefuncte culture period. It is located in the southeast section of Fontainebleau State Park near Mandeville, St. Tammany Parish, Louisiana.

The site was inhabited from 500 BCE to 1 CE during the Tchula period. Major excavations were directed by Clarence Johnson in 1938 and Edwin Doran in 1941.

== Site description ==
The Tchefuncte Site is located in the marsh a half-mile north of Lake Pontchartrain in eastern Louisiana. The site originally contained two oval-shaped shell middens, designated Midden A and Midden B. Midden A is about 52 meters long, 15 m wide, and 1.5 m thick. Midden B was approximately 46 m (151 ft) long and 33 m (108 ft) wide, but it is no longer in existence. The middens were composed mainly of shells of the brackish-water clam Rangia cuneata. At the time of the occupation just to the east of the site was a large bayou of fresh water emptying into the lake, and shortly after the occupation it shifted its course to a point about three quarters of a mile farther east.

== Excavations ==
The site was partially destroyed by commercial dredging before 1938. In 1938 construction crews wanted to use shell from the middens for road construction. Before this was done, Clarence Johnson, a historian for the Civilian Conservation Corps directed excavation of the north half of Midden B. The south half had already been destroyed by the commercial dredging. Johnson then turned his material and notes over to the Louisiana Archaeological Survey in Baton Rouge.

In 1941 further excavations of Midden B and Midden A were under the direction of Edwin B. Doran Jr. The results of these investigations were published in 1945 by James A. Ford and George I. Quimby, entitled "The Tchefuncte Culture: An Early Occupation of the Lower Mississippi Valley". This monograph used information from the Tchefuncte Site and other Tchefuncte culture sites (e.g., Little Woods (16OR1), Big Oak Island(16OR6), Copell (16VM102), and the Lafayette Mounds(16SM17)), and demonstrated that the site was occupied primarily by Tchefuncte cultural groups (c. 500 BCE to 1 CE) and helped establish Tchefuncte as the type site for the culture.

In 1986, Richard Weinstein and Charles Pearson of Coastal Environments, Inc., and Dave Davis of Tulane University excavated portions of Midden A as part of a field school for the Louisiana Archaeological Society. In 2000, archaeologists from the Regional Archaeology Program mapped the site for a National Register of Historic Places nomination.

== Tchefuncte culture ==
The Tchefuncte culture lasted from 600 BCE until 200 CE. Long-distance trade was much less important than during the preceding Poverty Point culture, but a trade network still existed between the areas now part of Louisiana, western Mississippi, coastal Alabama, eastern Texas, Arkansas, and southeastern Missouri. Their houses were probably temporary circular shelters having a frame of light poles covered with palmetto, thatch, or grass mixed with mud.

=== Food ===
The Tchefuncte culture people were primarily hunter-gatherers who lived in small hamlets in the Lower Mississippi Valley and Gulf Coast region between 1000 BCE and 200 CE. They lived in coastal areas and lowlands, usually near slow-moving streams. Their main food included a variety of seafoods, such as clams, alligators, and fish, but surprisingly not crabs or crawfish which were likely to have been available and abundant. They also hunted deer, raccoons, and some migratory birds.

=== Pottery ===
The Tchefuncte culture were the first people in Louisiana to make large amounts of pottery. Ceramics from the Tchefuncte culture have been found in sites from eastern Texas to eastern Florida, and from coastal Louisiana to southern Arkansas. Pottery was made by coiling clay into a shape and then smoothing it to form a container. Many shapes of pots were made, characteristically with "footed" bases. Vessels often featured designs created by pressing fingernails, twigs, or tools into the surface. After decorating, the pots were fired by slow baking. The use of a temper in the pottery to strengthen and keep it from cracking or shrinking unevenly had not yet been developed. The development of ceramic technology led to improved food management, better storage and cooking techniques. Ceramic pots also allowed stewing and other new cooking techniques to be experimented with and developed for the first time.

=== Chronology ===
In the cultural chronology of North American archaeological periods, the Tchefuncte culture was preceded by the Poverty Point culture, and was eventually succeeded by the Marksville culture.

== See also ==
- Mississippi Valley Cultures - List and table of archaeological periods
- Woodland period
