= Tchula period =

Archaeological period in North America

The Tchula period is an early period in an archaeological chronology of North America. It covers the early development of permanent settlements, agriculture, and large societies.

The Tchula period (800 BCE – 200 CE) encompasses the Tchefuncte and Lake Cormorant cultures during the Woodland period around the coastal plains of what is now Louisiana and northward into the region that became southern Arkansas and east into the Yazoo Basin in present-day Mississippi.
