= E. Wyllys Andrews IV =

American archaeologist

- Born: December 11, 1916; Chicago, Illinois, US
- Died: July 3, 1971 (aged 54); New Orleans, Louisiana, US

Academic background
- Education: Harvard University

Academic work
- Discipline: Archeology
- Sub-discipline: Maya civilization
- Institutions: Tulane University Middle American Research Institute

Edward Wyllys Andrews IV (December 11, 1916 – July 3, 1971) was an American archaeologist noted for research into Maya civilization. During his career with Tulane University's Middle American Research Institute, Andrews focused on Mayan ruins, rediscovering several sites and leading investigations into Balankanche, Kulubá, Coba, and more.

== Early life ==
From his childhood Andrews collected geological and paleontological artifacts and developed an interest in Maya culture in his teens. His grandfather and great-grandfather were noted medical doctors in Chicago, Illinois and his father was also born in Chicago.

At the age of 15 he began studying archaeology in Mesa Verde in an archaeological excavation with Byron Cummings.

== Education ==
In 1933, he enrolled at the University of Chicago where he worked at the Field Museum on the subject of Maya hieroglyphics and herpetology. He accompanied Sylvanus G. Morley to Chichen Itza, Yucatan.

He enrolled at Harvard University where he earned his doctorate in 1942. By the age of 21, he had published five scientific papers, mainly on Maya hieroglyphics.

During World War II, Andrews served in the United States Navy and after the war joined the Central Intelligence Agency.

== Career ==
After the war, Andrews returned to his archaeological duties at the Mesoamerican Research Institute at Tulane University. For the academic year 1950–1951 he was a Guggenheim Fellow. Andrews devoted the last 40 years of his life to the study of the Mayan civilization, dedicating particular focus to the north of the peninsula, as in the Dzibilchaltún site that he had already visited before the war. He was the first to conjecture that this archaeological site was a large Mayan urban center and not a set of sites in a large archaeological area as originally thought.

== Research and discoveries ==
Andrews worked on several Maya sites including:

- Dzibilchaltún
- Balankanche
- Kulubá
- Coba

== Legacy ==
Andrews died in New Orleans on July 3, 1971. His son, E. Wyllys Andrews V served as director of the Middle American Research Institute at Tulane, from 1975 until 2009 and continued as an emeritus professor.
