= Bayou Grande Cheniere Mounds =

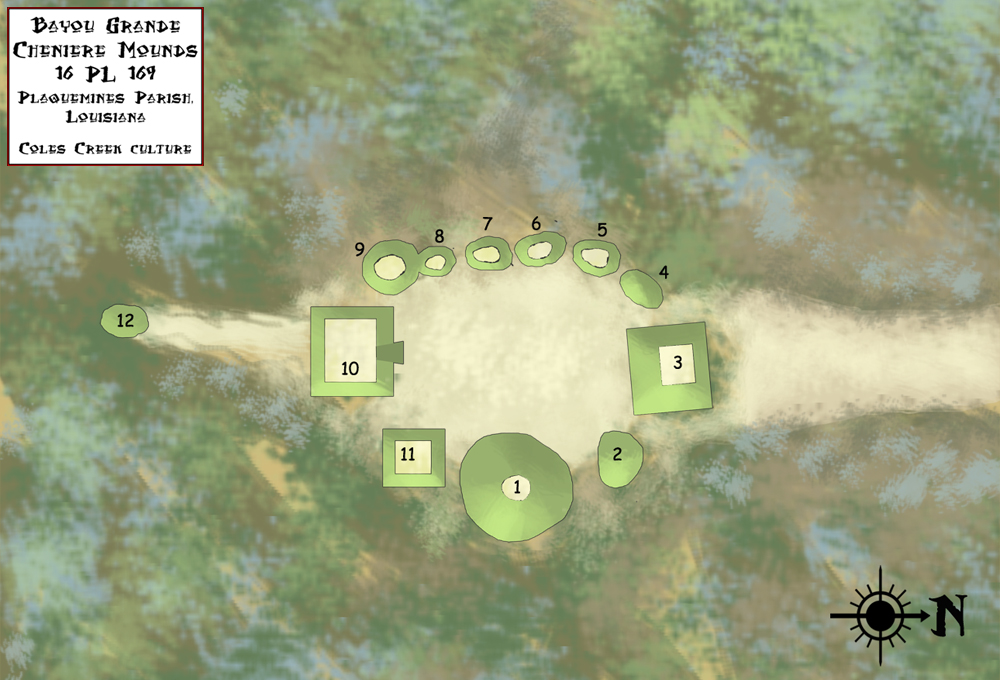
- Layout of mounds at the Bayou Grande Cheniere Mounds

- Location within Louisiana today
- 29°29′46.68″N 89°47′33.324″W
- Cultures: Coastal Coles Creek culture
- Location: Plaquemines Parish, Louisiana, USA
- Region: Plaquemines Parish, Louisiana

History
- Built: 700 CE
- Abandoned: 1200 CE

Site notes
- Excavation dates: 1926, 2003

Bayou Grande Cheniere Mounds (16 PL 159) is an archaeological site in Plaquemines Parish near the southeast corner of Louisiana. Built by the Coastal Coles Creek culture, it was inhabited from 875 to 1200 CE, from the Early Coles Creek period to the Coles Creek/Plaquemine period.

== Description ==
The site is located on a natural levee of Bayou Grande Chenière and has twelve mounds, eleven arranged around a central plaza and one 75 metres (246 ft) to the south, connected to the main group by a constructed landform. The site was connected by a manmade causeway to Bayou Grande Chenière. The elliptical plaza measures 100 feet (30 m) on its north-south axis by 75 feet (23 m) east-west. Mound 1, the largest, is a conical mound measuring 60 feet (18 m) and located on the eastern edge of the plaza. The southern edge of the plaza is bounded by Mound 10 and the northern edge by Mound 3, both are platform mounds. The western edge of the plaza is a string of interconnected small mounds, Mounds 4 to 9.

The site is unusual in its size and number of mounds. Typically Coastal Coles Creek settlements had three mounds arranged around a plaza. The site's plan and large scale are most like the large Coles Creek settlement in Avoyelles Parish, the Greenhouse site.

== Excavations ==
Henry Collins, Jr., an assistant entomologist for the Smithsonian Institution, first excavated the site in 1926. The mound site was mapped by McGimsey in 2000. Dr. Rebecca Saunders, Timothy Schilling, and seven students from Louisiana State University conducted field excavations at the site in January 2003. Pottery found during excavations was dated from 875 to 1200 CE during the Bayou Ramos (700-875 CE), Bayou Cutler (875-1000 CE) and St. Gabriel (1000-1200 CE) phases, spanning the Early Coles Creek period to the Transitional Coles Creek/Plaquemine period for the eastern delta. No material from earlier than the Troyville culture were found, nor were any materials from after the Plaquemine period.

In the late 2000s NASA's Stennis Space Center, in partnership with the US Army Corps of Engineers New Orleans District and Tulane University, undertook an archaeological survey of the southeastern Louisiana marshes, including the Bayou Grande Chenière site. This survey discovered the manmade causeway leading from the site to the bayou.

== See also ==
- Morgan Mounds
- Little Pecan Island Site
- Culture, phase, and chronological table for the Mississippi Valley
