= Middle American Research Institute =

- Established: 1924
- Location: Tulane University, Dinwiddie Hall, 3rd floor, New Orleans, Louisiana, U.S.
- Coordinates: 29.935012°N 90.122190°W
- Type: Archaeology museum
- Director: Marcello Canuto
- Website: liberalarts.tulane.edu/mari

The Middle American Research Institute was established at Tulane University in 1924.

== Mission ==
The Middle American Research Institute seeks to study and safeguard the culture and history of the areas of Mesoamerica and lower Central America. The Institute supports education and research in archaeology, ethnography, ethnohistory, linguistics, and art history throughout Mexico and Central America. The Middle American Research Institute seeks to disseminate the results of its scholarship to academics, students, educators, and the public.

== History ==
=== Directors ===
==== William E. Gates (1924–1926) ====
The Department of Middle American research started at Tulane in 1924 with William E. Gates as its director. Samuel Zemurray, president of the Cuyamel Fruit Company, generously donated $300,000 to “support the new Department of Middle American Research in the university, and supply money for an archaeological expedition.” Additionally, Zemurray bought Gates’ private library of original sources on the prehistory of Mexico and linguistics of the Maya area. At its beginning, the department was housed in a part of Dinwiddie Hall with a library containing 2,500 pieces, mostly from Gate's private collection. These texts would one day become the core of Tulane's Latin American Library. In 1925, Gates hired field archaeologist Frans Blom to lead the Department's first expedition into the Mexican hinterland. The report of the First Tulane Expedition, Tribes and Temples, became the Department's first publication. More staff hires included Ralph Roys, and Oliver La Farge.

==== Frans Blom (1926–1940) ====
Following disputes between members of the Department of Middle American Research and the president of Tulane, Frans Blom took over in the position of Director of the Department. In this position, Blom decided to promote “archaeology as the major function of the department.”

During Blom's time as director, he led multiple extensive expeditions to Latin America. In his own words, Blom describes the first expedition: “We discovered twenty-four ruined cities hitherto unrecorded by scientists… To sum up the matter in a few words, the work that we have begun in Central America will put Tulane University on the map as having the greatest department in the country on Maya Indian study.” Throughout his time with the Department, Blom participated in four major expeditions covering areas and topics including Guatemalan ancestral ritual calendars, investigations of Mayan ritual cycles at Jacaltenango, and a long trek from the southern coast of Chiapas to Chichen Itza on the Yucatán. Tulane's location in New Orleans (a major port city servicing Latin America) meant that the Department was often frequented by researchers on their way into the field.

The Department of Middle American Research became known internationally when reproductions of architecture from the Nunnery Quadrangle at Uxmal, discovered during the Institute's expeditions, were displayed at the World's Fair of 1933. These early expeditions account for most of the Institute's current anthropological collections.

In 1938 the Department of Middle American Research was renamed the Middle American Research Institute. Blom's career at the Institute lasted until he was asked to resign for health reasons in November 1941.

==== Robert Wauchope (1942–1975) ====
Robert Wauchope taught archaeology at the University of Georgia and then directed the Laboratory of Anthropology and Archaeology at the University of North Carolina-Chapel Hill. Following World War II, Wauchope came to the Middle American Research Institute to pursue his research at Zacualpa in the Guatemalan highlands. During Wauchope's time as director, the Institute became increasingly integrated with Tulane. Researchers took roles as professors, and projects spanned multiple departments within the university. Wauchope was praised for his “revitalization of the Middle American Research Institute in less than a decade.”

In 1954, he became President of the Society for American Anthropology, and in 1957 Wauchope was named the general editor for the Handbook of Middle American Indians. The Handbook became the “most ambitious single project of scholarly editing ever undertaken at Tulane.” The project was funded by the National Science Foundation, and strived to create an encyclopedia of all current knowledge of North and South American Indians. Wauchope was responsible for organizing the content of more than three hundred authorities who submitted articles. This work was done with the help of Margaret Harrison, an editor of the handbook. The University of Texas Press published the handbook between 1957 and 1974.

During the 1960s the Middle American Research Institute began, once again, to focus more heavily on anthropology as opposed to multi-disciplinary research.

After over three decades as the Middle American Research Institute's Director, Wauchope retired, passing on the responsibility to the son of an old friend and coworker, E. Wyllys Andrews V.

==== E. Wyllys Andrews V (1975–2009) ====
Andrews began his time with the Middle American Research Institute as the director of the Program of Research on the Yucatán Peninsula from 1972-1974. He soon followed in the footsteps of his father, archaeologist E. Wyllys Andrews IV, who worked with M.A.R.I. at the site of Dzibilchaltun in Yucatán, Mexico until 1971. Andrews took over as Director of the Middle American Research Institute in 1975.

Andrew's main goal was to publish the archaeological research of the Institute from the archaeological program in Yucatán from the 1950s through the 1970s. Such publications include Excavations at Dzibilchaltun, Yucatán, Mexico and Prehistoric Maya Settlement Patterns at Becan, Campeche, Mexico. This continued focus on publication and field research led to a tripling of the number of graduate students working in Maya archaeology.

In the late 1970s Andrews gathered grants to begin research on Maya farming settlements around Komchen, Mexico. Work at Komchen revealed trade networks spanning into the highlands of Guatemala.

The principal excavations of the Lenca archaeological site of Quelepa were also carried out under his direction from 1967–1969.

The Copan Acropolis Archaeological Project was directed by Andrews from 1990 to 1994 following the director Robert J. Sharer of the Museum of Archaeology and Anthropology at the University of Pennsylvania. Work focused on variation in material culture and behavior within the Late Classic royal residence. This was achieved through ceramic and obsidian artifact analysis, study of sculpture, and investigations of El Cementerio

==== Marcello A. Canuto (2009–present day) ====
Marcello Canuto is the current director of Tulane University's Middle American Research Institute. His field work focuses on the areas of La Corona in Guatemala and the El Paraíso valley in Honduras, where he studies the socio-political organization of the prehispanic Maya.

During his time as director the Institute's home, Dinwiddie Hall, was renovated. This renovation allowed the Institute the opportunity to build a larger modern exhibit gallery, as well as digitized storage systems for archives and collections. The Middle American Research Institute is also working on community outreach through the continuation of the Tulane Maya Symposium as well as school group visits, and updated exhibits.

== Research ==
Since the Institute was founded a century ago, M.A.R.I. has sponsored archaeological, linguistic, historical, and ethnographic research in Mesoamerica. In the early 1900s, expeditions focused on Mexico, and have since expanded to include research in Guatemala, Honduras, Belize, and El Salvador.

Recently, the Middle American Research Institute has received some attention for Dr. Canuto's role as director of excavations at La Corona in Guatemala. For this research, Canuto was awarded the National Geographic Society grant. Other recent findings include a broken stone monument at the site of El Achiotal, which speaks of the anniversary of an Early Classic king installed by Siyaj K'ak' from the Valley of Mexico, discovered by graduate student Luke Auld-Thomas in 2015, as well as a 6 foot tall stucco mask. Francisco Estrada-Belli, a Research Assistant Professor at the Middle American Research Institute, discovered an impressive stucco frieze in Holmul, Guatemala in 2013. Additionally, Marc Zender is an epigrapher studying Maya hieroglyphic writing and comparative writing systems, and he also teaches and studies on the linguistics of Mesoamerican languages.

== Visiting the museum ==
The Middle American Research Institute gallery is open to the public Monday through Friday from 9am to 4pm at Tulane University, Dinwiddie Hall, 3rd Floor, New Orleans, LA 70118.

For further information contact the Institute at mari@tulane.edu or (504)-865-5110.

== Exhibits Gallery ==
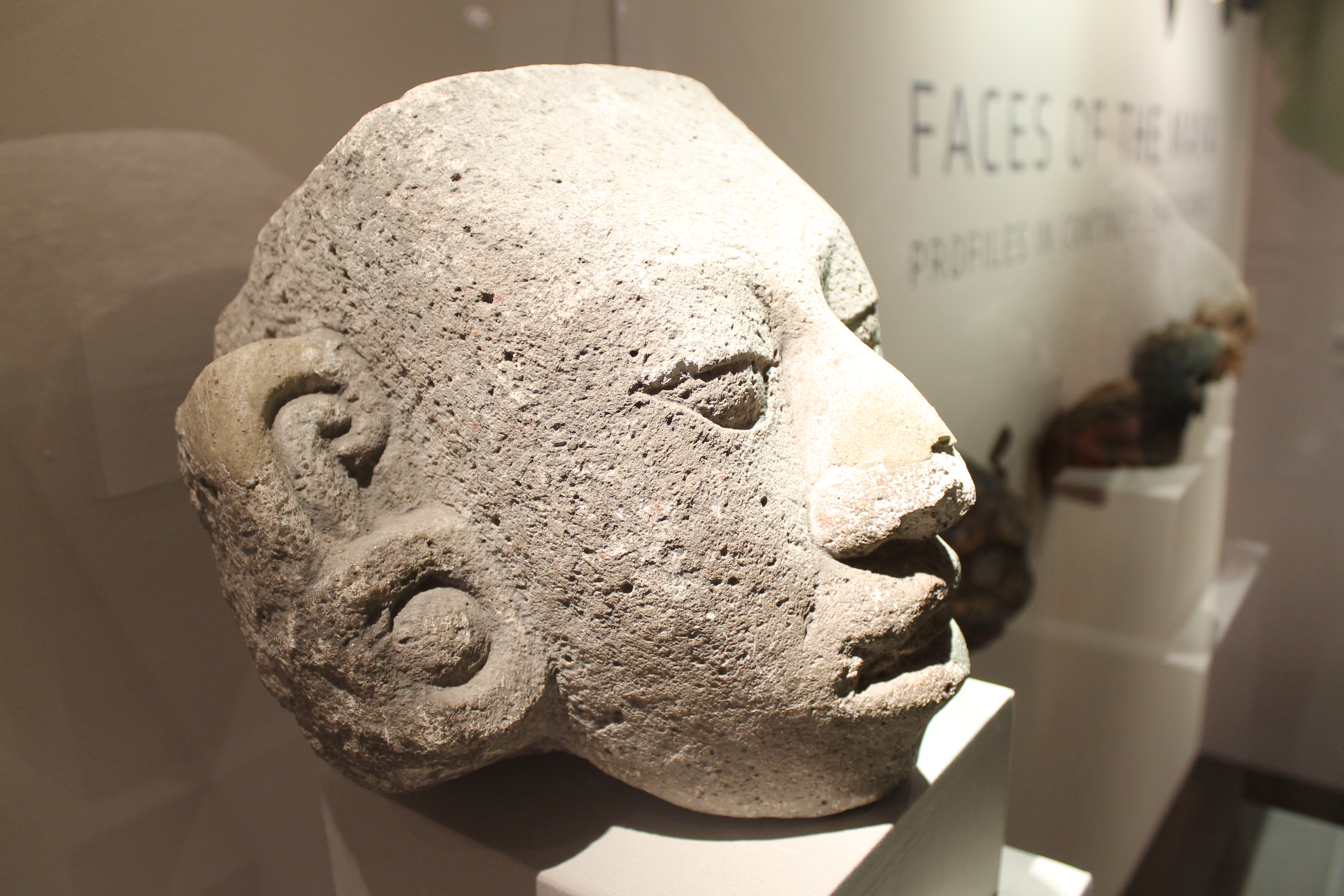
Carved stone head from the Late Classic Period. From Copan, Honduras.

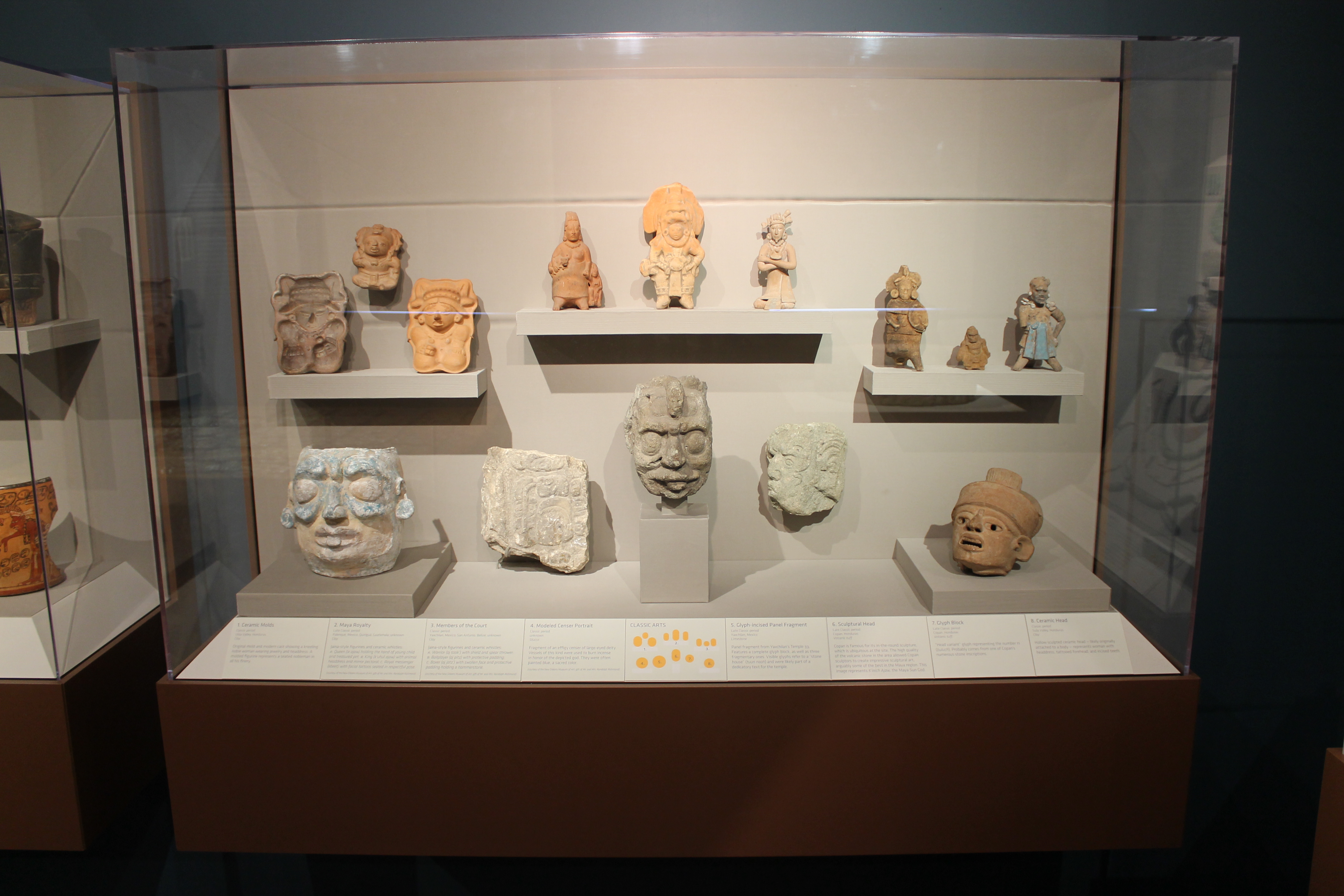
Non-Maya Preclassic: Figurines and Pendants.

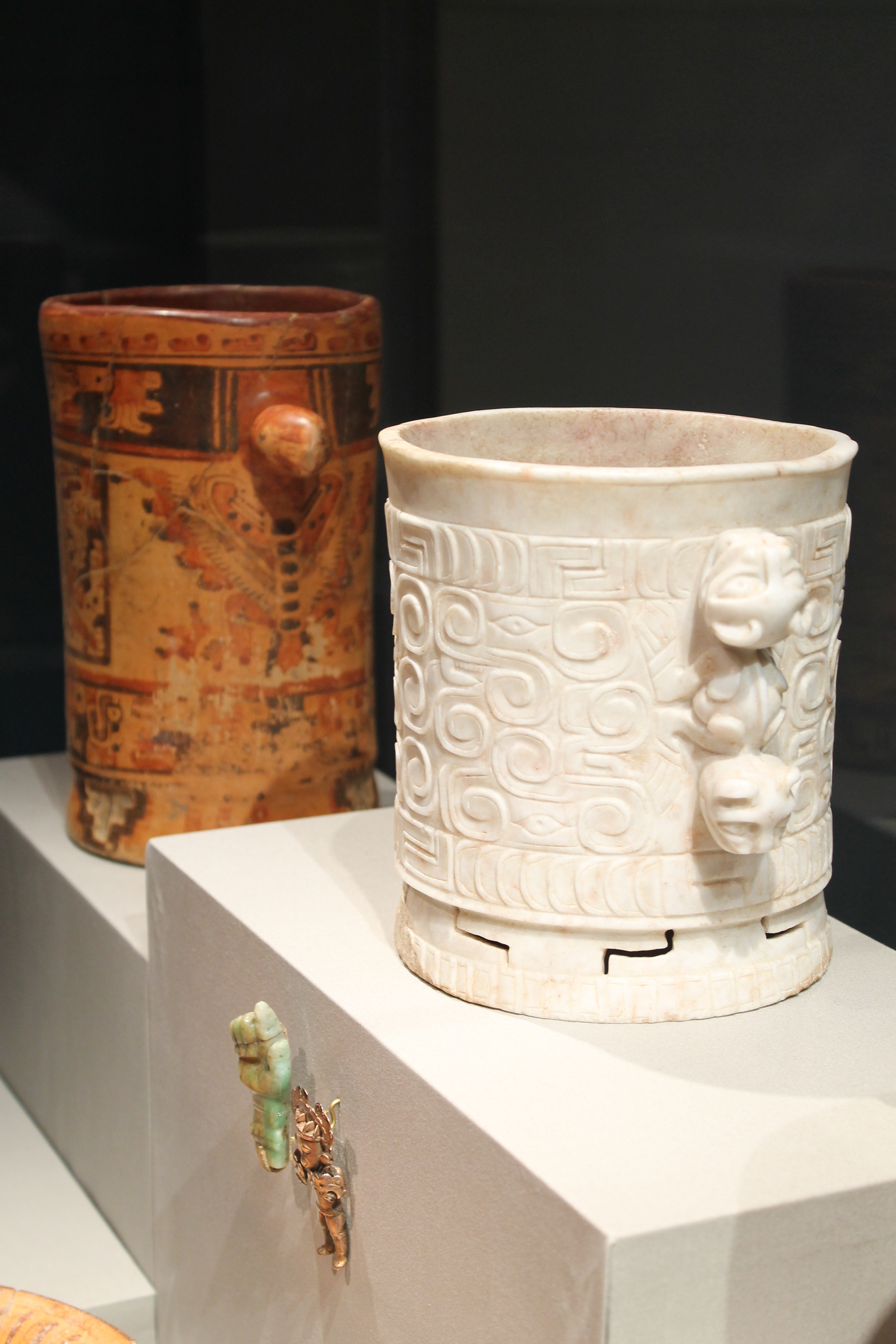
Cylindrical vessels: Ulúa Marble Vases; Ulúa Polychrome Vessel with Eagle-Head Handles from the Classic period. From Honduras

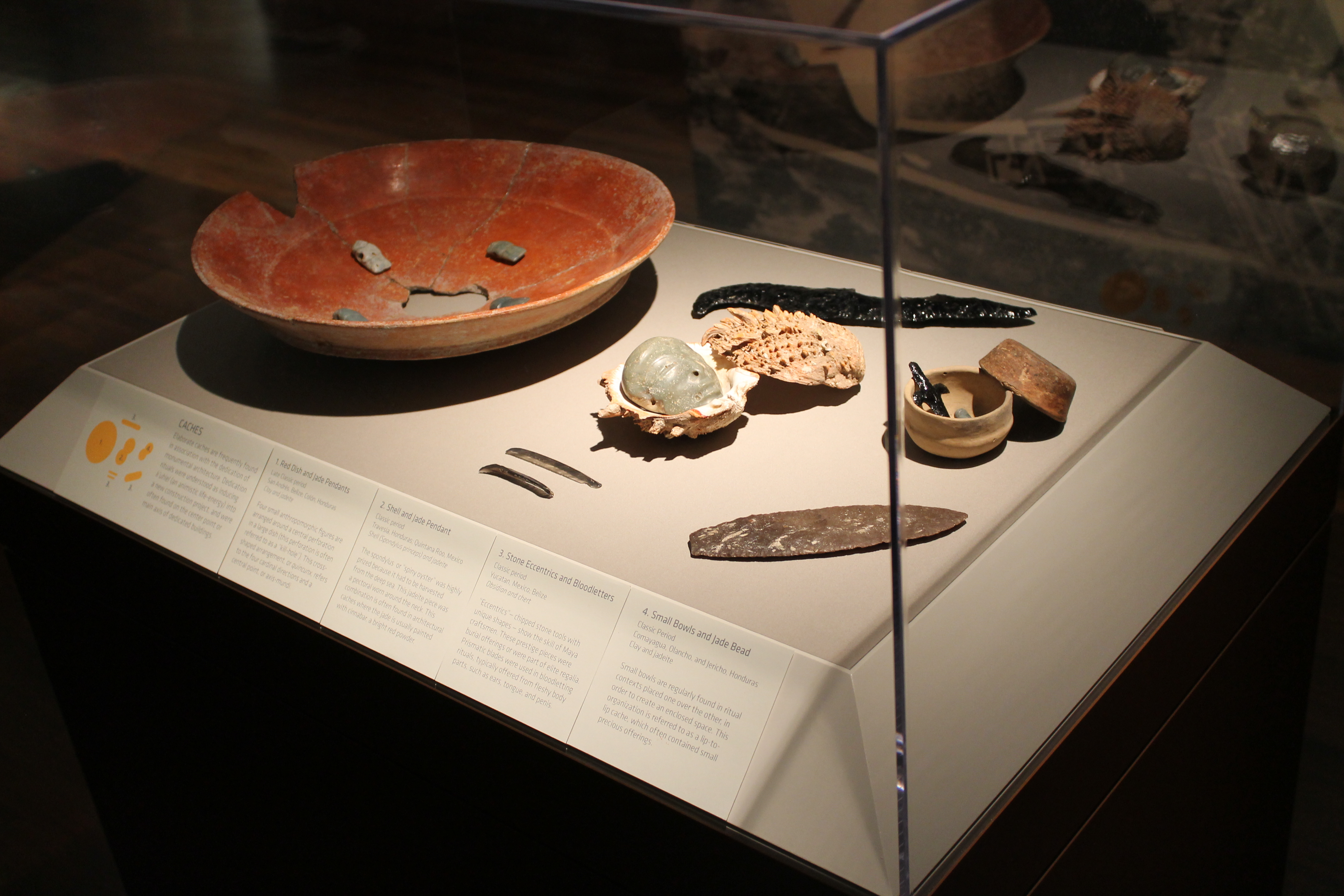
Red Dish and Jade Pendants; Shell and Jade Pendant; Stone Eccentrics and Bloodletters; Small Bowls and Jade Bead

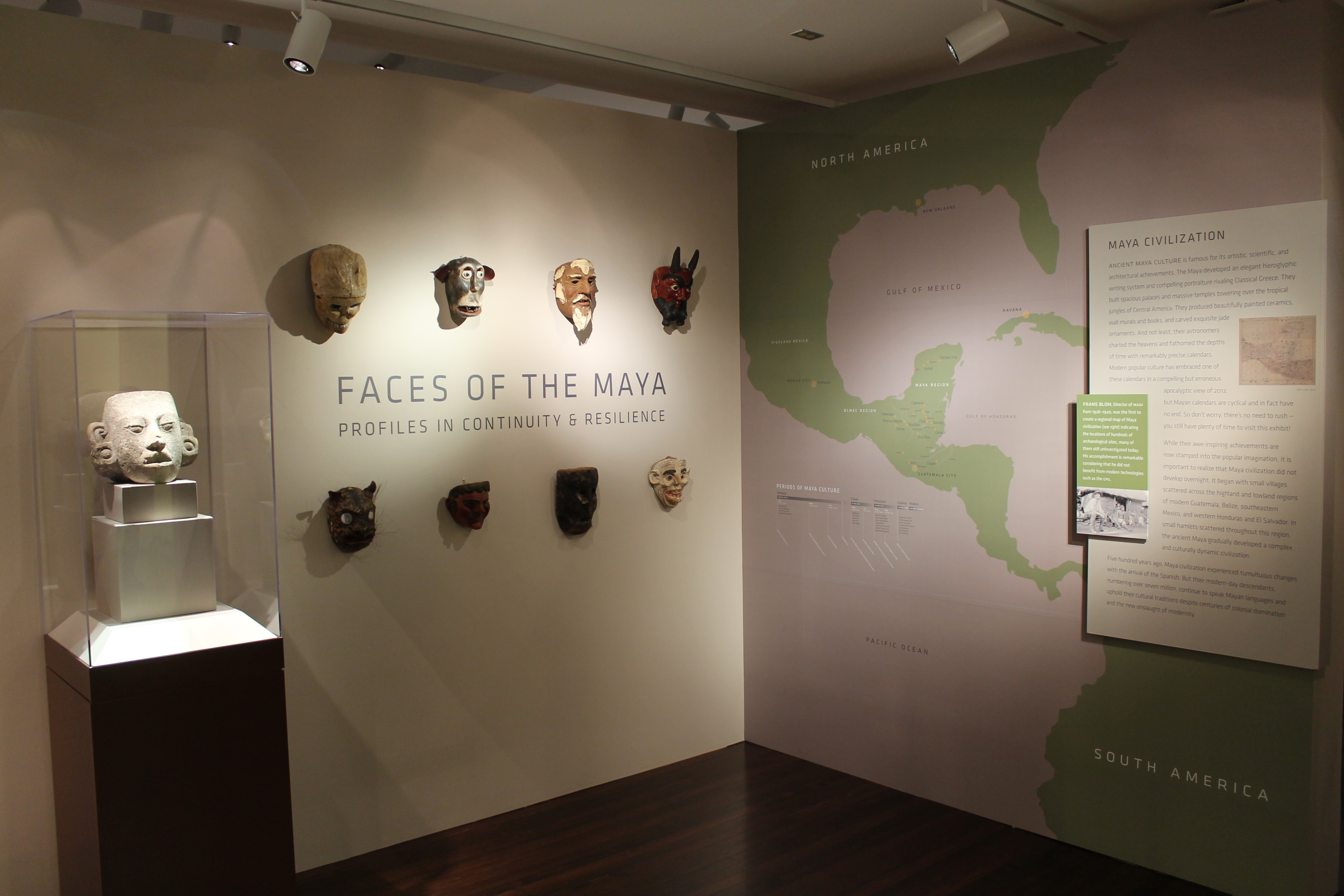
Entrance wall with map of Mesoamerica and exhibit name

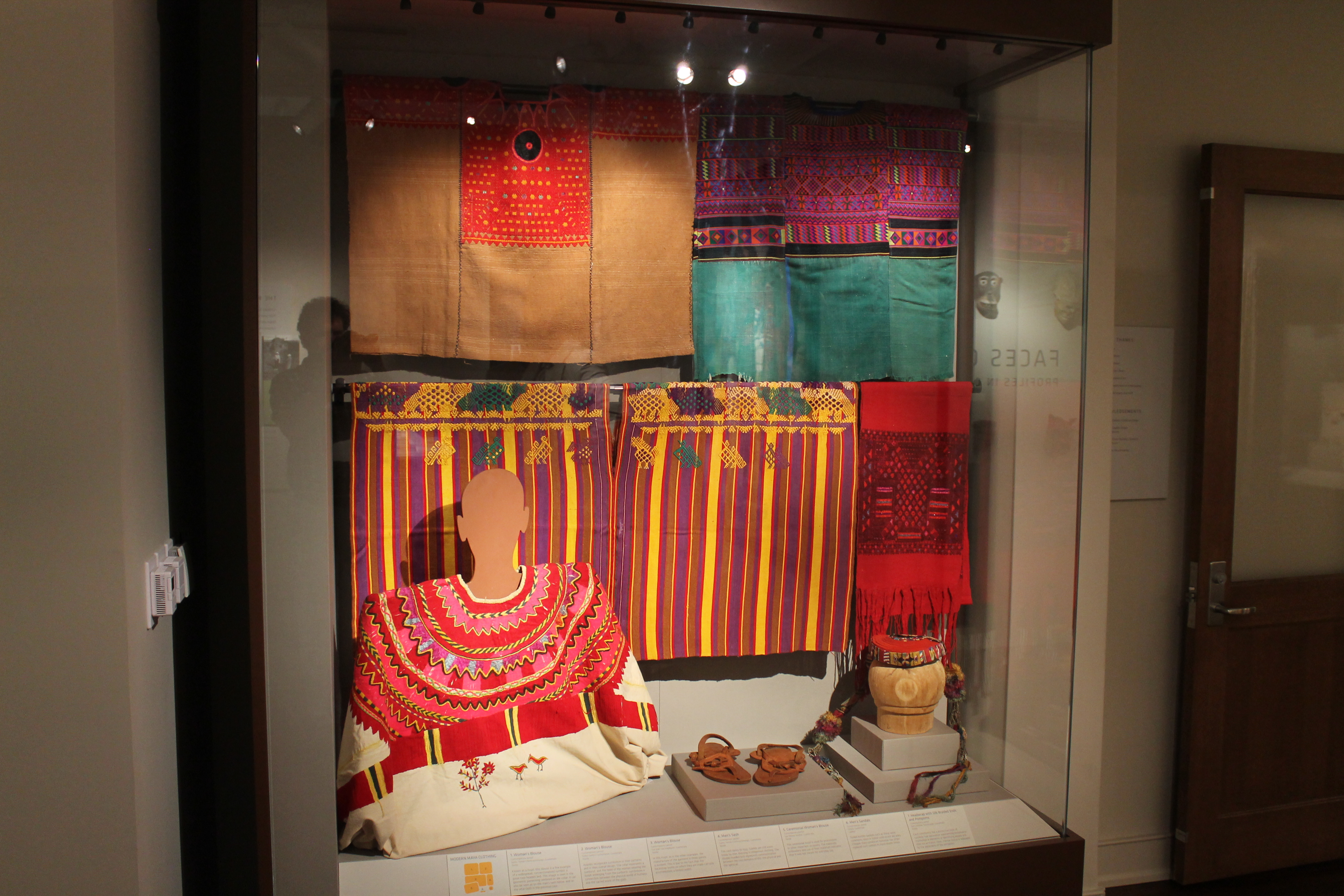
Guatemalan textiles from the Modern Period

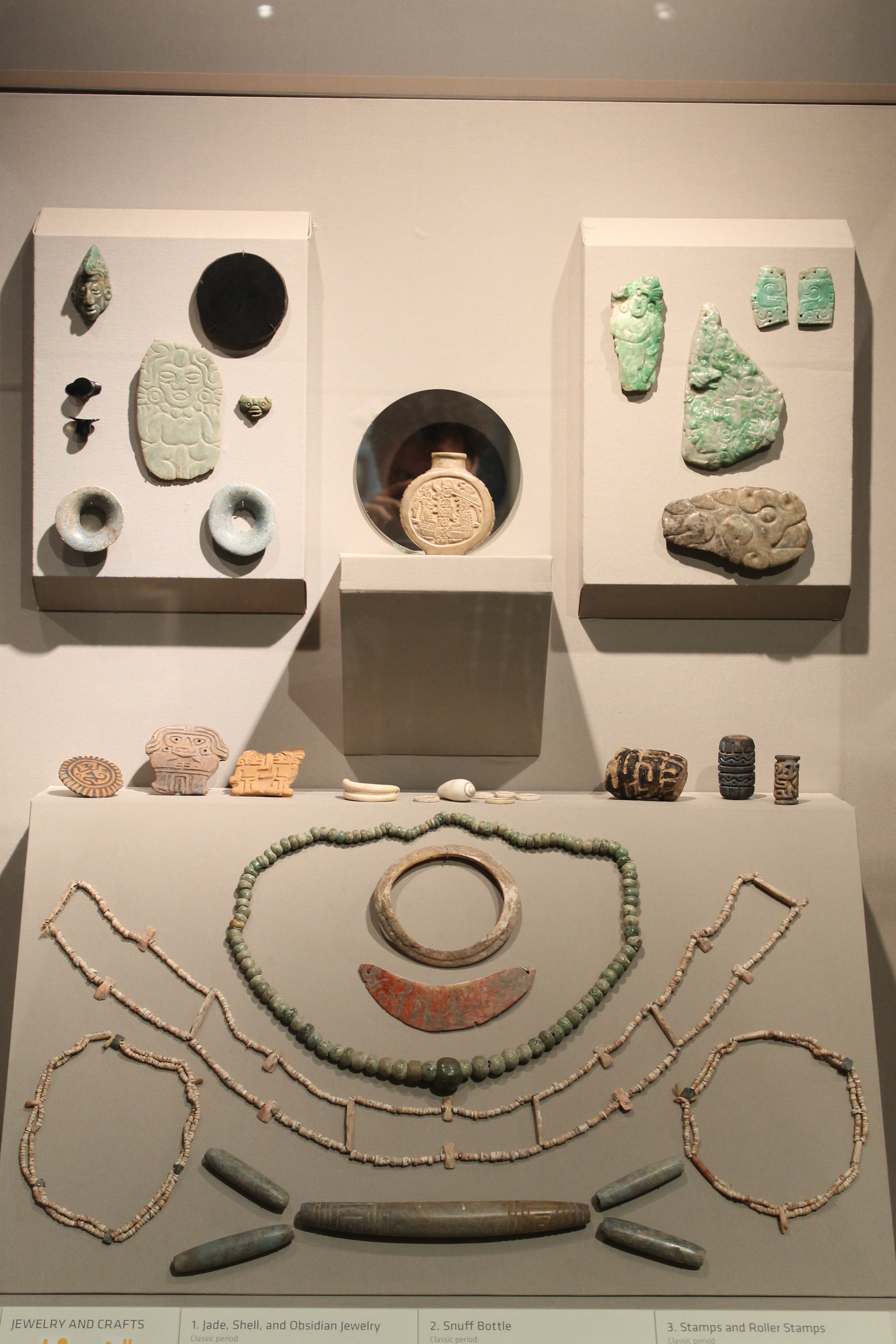
Jade, Shell, and Obsidian Jewelry; Snuff Bottle; Stamps and Roller Stamps

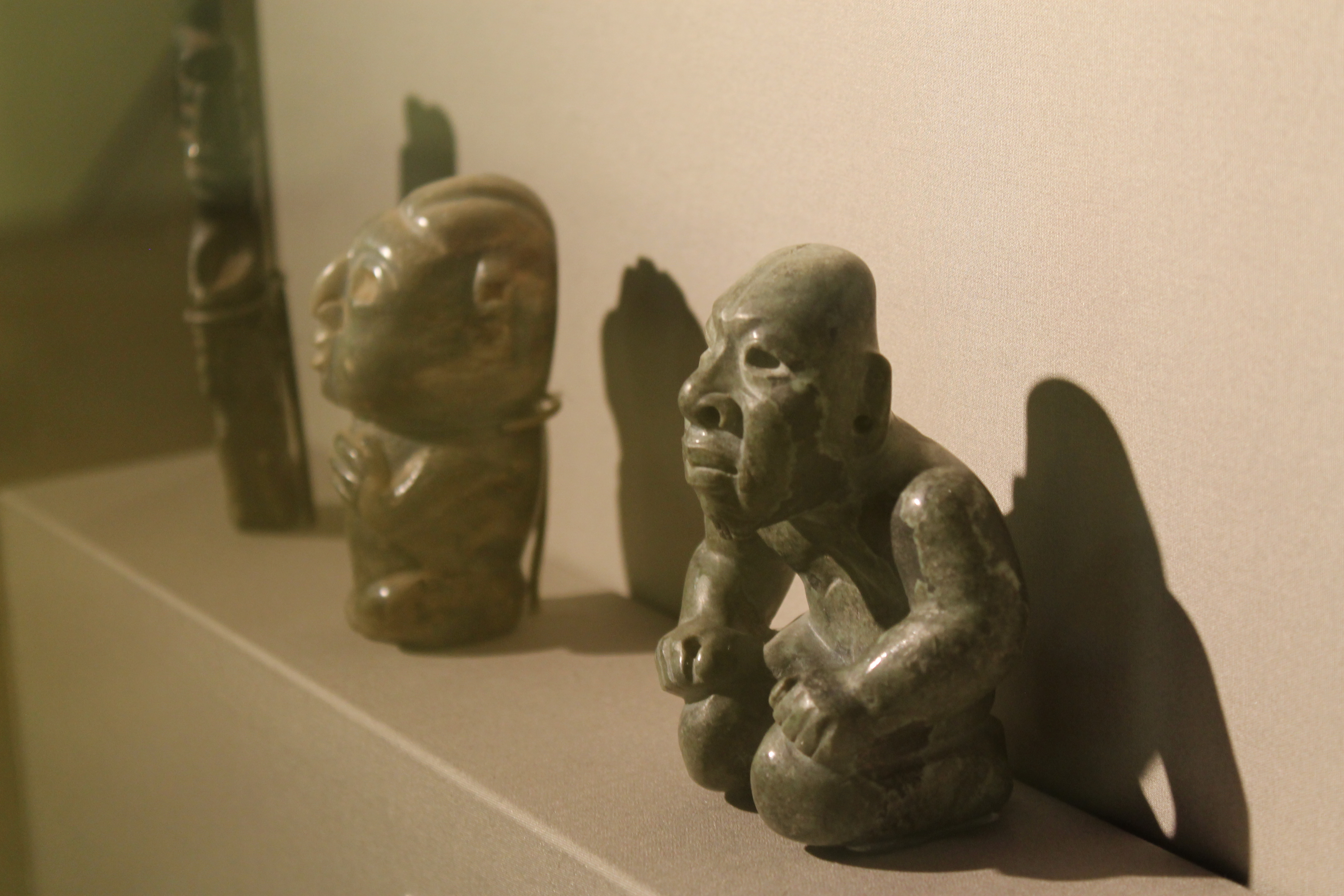
Olmecoid figurine from the Middle Preclassic period. From La Lima, Honduras

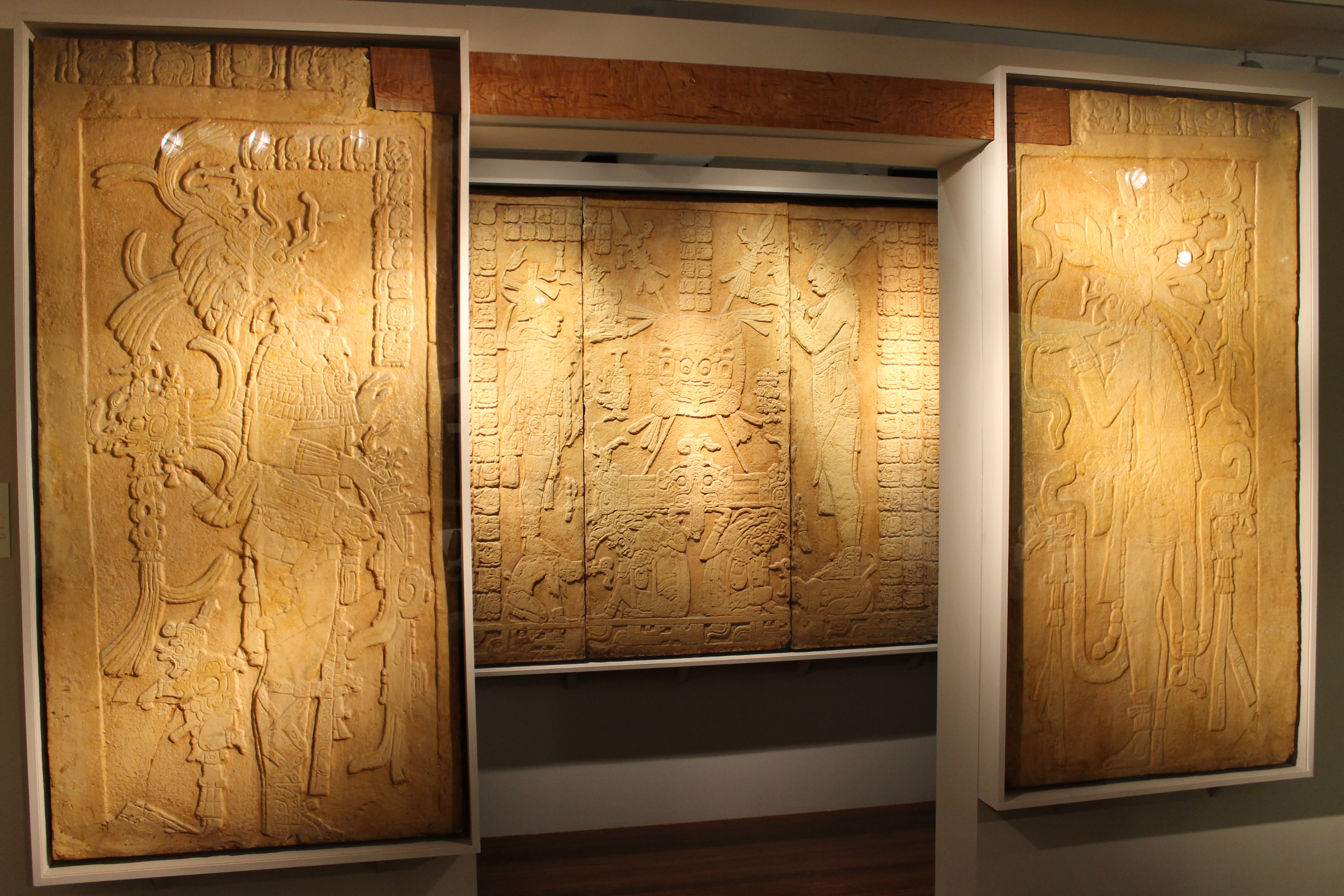
Casts of carved panels from the "Temple of the Sun", Palenque.

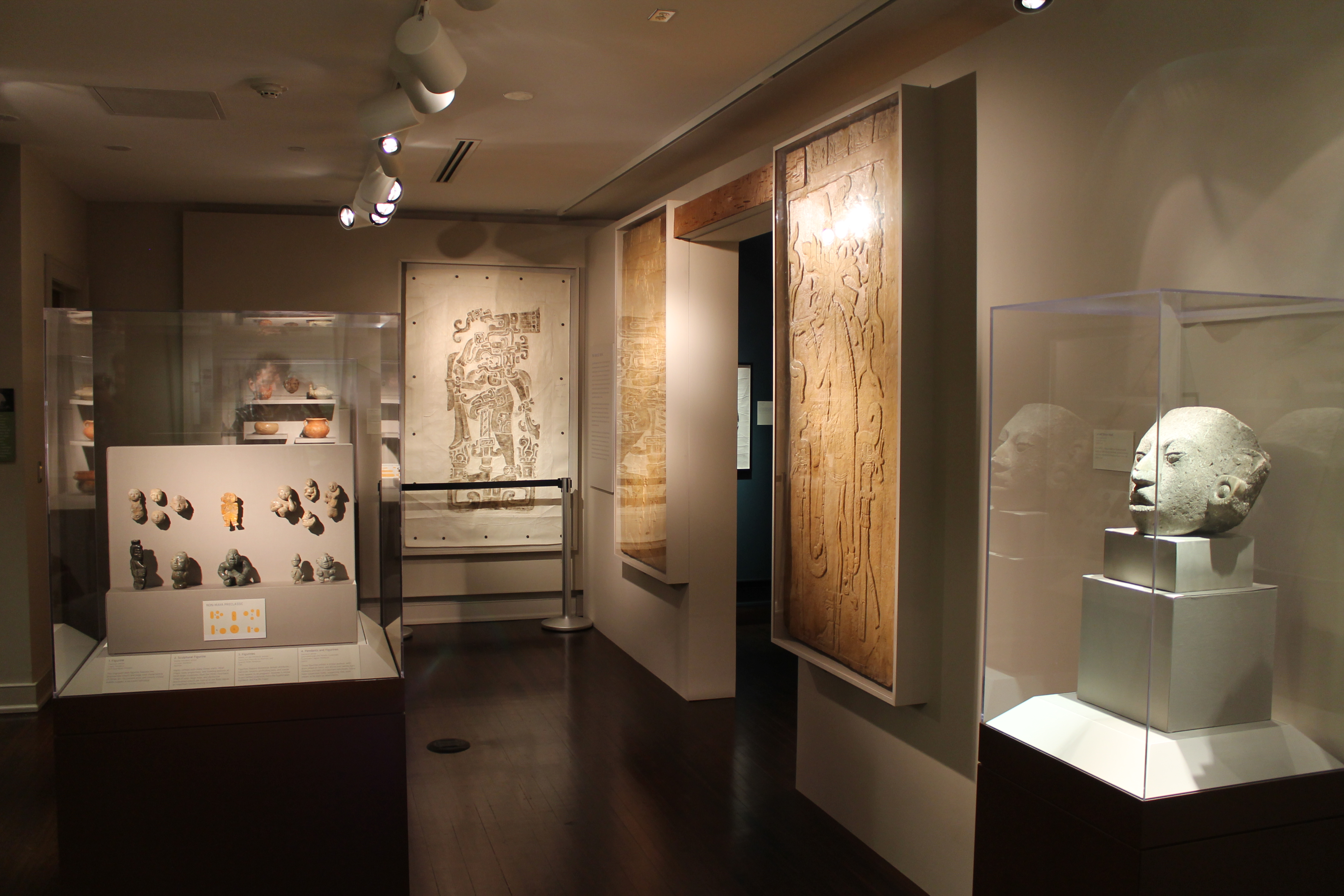
General shot of exhibit room 1

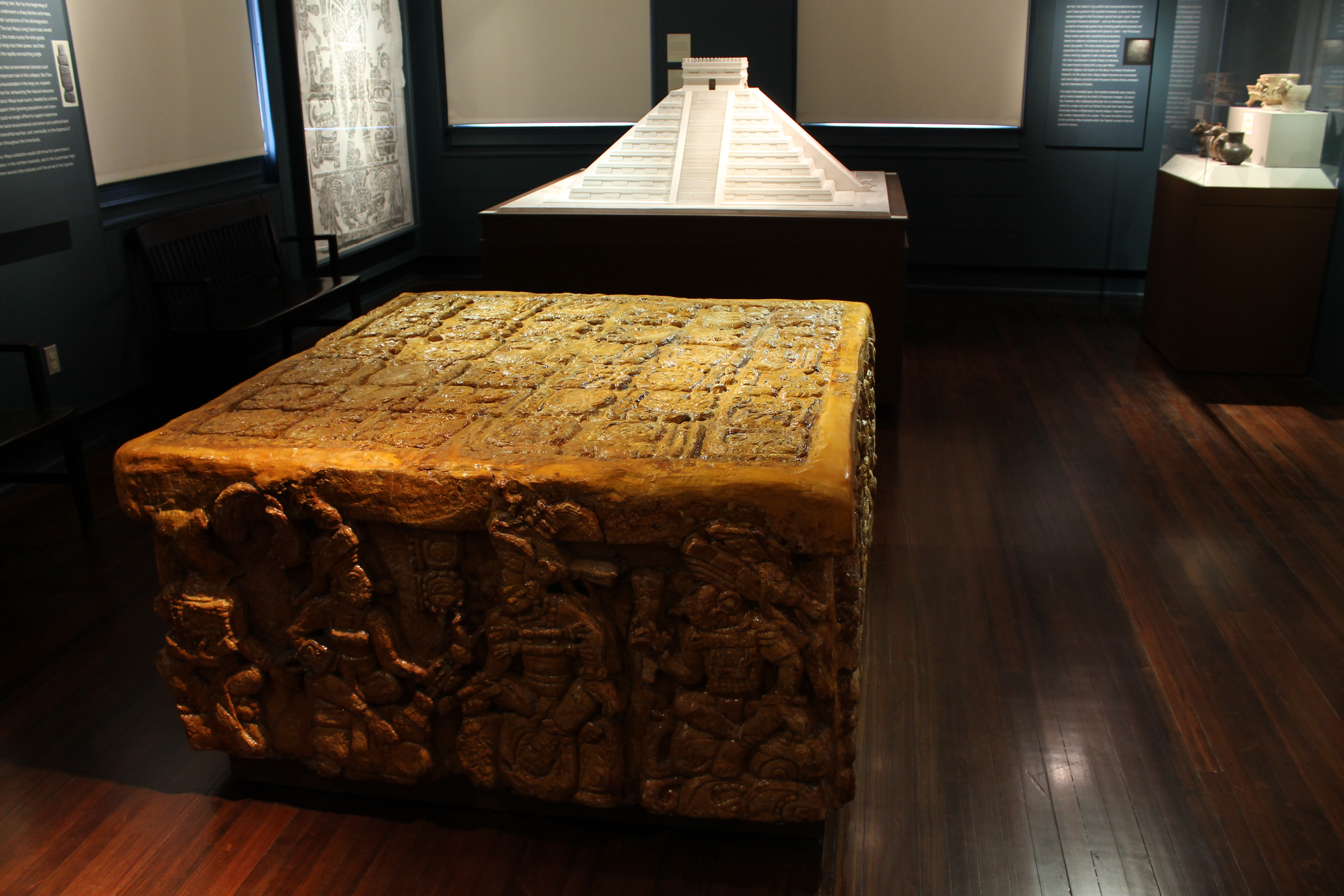
Altar Q (Late Classic period, Copan, Honduras) and El Castillo (Terminal Classic period, Chichen Itzá, Mexico)

== Collections ==
Archaeological artifacts, ethnographic materials, and miscellanea comprise the M.A.R.I. physical collection. M.A.R.I. curates objects from all over the world with emphasis on collections from Middle America. Stone tools from the United States, Honduran pot sherds, Egyptian coffins, Mexican masks, Guatemalan textiles, Amazonian featherwork, and the iconic Tulane pennant exemplify the range of materials in the collection.

== Archives ==
The Institute houses an extensive archive of primary and secondary sources including Institute correspondence, maps, journals, and photographs. The archive spans the entirety of the Americas including the Pepper Collection of photographs from the U.S. Southwest; field journals, maps, and photos from the Institute's early expeditions in Middle America; and miscellaneous personal archives donated to the Institute by scholars interested in Mesoamerican archaeology and ethnography. Records concerning the acquisition and documentation of the physical collection are also included in the archives.

== Tulane Maya Symposium ==
Starting in 2002, the Stone Center at Tulane University began hosting an annual Tulane Maya Symposium. The Middle American Research Institute took over this program in 2010. Yearly, a weekend is dedicated to workshops and talks centered on the study of the Maya civilization of Mexico and Central America, with each year focusing on a specific theme in Maya studies. This effort in scholarship reflects the mission statement of the Institute, promoting both education and research.

== External sources ==
Middle American Research Institute Official Site: http://mari.tulane.edu/

Barr, Kenneth. Find amazing relics of Mayas’ empire. The New York Times, 20 August 1925, p. 1, 6.

Barr, Kenneth. Tales of Maya Indians recounted by explorer. The New York Times 30 August 1925, p. XX6, New York.

Brunhouse, Robert L. Pursuit of the Ancient Maya: Some Archaeologists of Yesterday. University of New Mexico Press, Albuquerque. 1975.

Kelker, Nancy L., and Karen O. Bruhns. Faking Ancient Mesoamerica. Left Coast Press, Walnut Creek, California. 2010.

McVicker, Donald. Institutional Autonomy and Its Consequences: The Middle American Research Institute at Tulane University. Histories of Anthropology Annual 4:34–57. 2008.

New York Times. Tulane explorers find sacred island. 29 March, p. E4, New York. 1925.

New York Times. Mayan ruins found near Puerto. 2 April, p. 14, New York. 1925.

New York Times. Marvels in tomb of Maya monarch. 21 August, p. 1, 6, New York. 1925.

New York Times. Back with relics of ancient Mayas. 24 November, p. 13, New York. 1925.

Wauchope, Robert. Lost Tribes and Sunken Continents: Myth and Method in the Study of American Indians. University of Chicago Press, Chicago. 1962.

Wicks, Robert S., and Roland H. Harrison. Buried Cities, Forgotten Gods: William Niven's Life of Discovery and Revolution in Mexico and the American Southwest. Texas Tech University Press, Lubbock. 1999.
