= Morgan Mounds =

- Location within Louisiana today
- 29°38′50.82″N 92°26′7.656″W
- Cultures: Coastal Coles Creek culture
- Location: Pecan Island, Louisiana, USA
- Region: Vermilion Parish, Louisiana

History
- Built: 700 CE
- Abandoned: 1000 CE

Site notes
- Architectural style: Platform mounds
- Excavation dates: 1926, 1979, 1986
- Archaeologists: Henry B. Collins, Ian Brown, Richard Fuller,

Morgan Mounds (16 VM 9) is an important archaeological site of the Coastal Coles Creek culture, built and occupied by Native Americans from 700 to 1000 CE on Pecan Island in Vermilion Parish, Louisiana. Of the 45 recorded Coastal Coles Creek sites in the Petite Anse region, it is the only one with ceremonial substructure mounds. These indicate that it was possibly the center of a local chiefdom.

== Description ==
The site is located on the only significant high ground in the marshy area, Pecan Island, a bifurcated backridge of alluvial deposits known as a "chenier". The geologic feature formed about 4000 to 6000 years ago when the shifting of the Mississippi Delta stranded ancient beaches. The area was a rich environment with abundant marine resources from brackish and freshwater marshes and woodland resources from the forests on the cheniers (named by the early French settlers for the oak trees or "chênes" that grew on them). Much of the indigenous local population did not live permanently at the Morgan site in prehistoric times, but in scattered hamlets and homesteads, often identified by the shell middens left behind at the edges of lakes and streams. The site originally included four ceremonial platform mounds arranged around the four sides of a central rectangular plaza.

The mounds themselves were built in stages over an extended period, with gaps in between construction phases. These stages included a pre-mound midden, indicating people were living at the site before the construction of mounds. Later residents raised a mound over this area, and built a separate structure at its summit. This earthwork construction was a sophisticated engineering feat, using the loose and gritty sand and crushed shell material of the chenier, mixed with the scooped-up topsoil of the midden, to construct a stable rectangular embankment. This embankment was then filled in with more of the loose chenier material of sand and crushed shell. The use of the embankment created structures stable enough to last more than 1000 years without collapsing. The mound was overlain with a protective cap of silty, gray clay taken from a local bayou.

At a later date, a second building episode enlarged and raised the mound higher, with the eventual height of Mound 1 reaching more than 4 metres (13 ft). Another structure was built on the new summit. The structure at the summit was a 9 metres (30 ft) in diameter circular building, with many interior partitions and a large central hearth. The building was constructed of wooden posts set into the mound summit surface and covered with a layer of daub or clay, creating a relatively permanent structure. Multiple post holes at the site suggest the structures may have been rebuilt more than once.

== Inhabitants ==
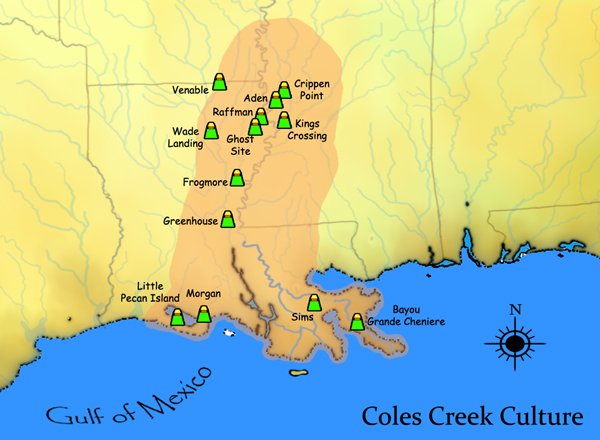
A map showing the extent of the Coles Creek cultural period and some important sites

The inhabitants of the Morgan Mounds seem to have been an anomaly in the area. Before the building of Morgan, starting in about 700 CE, the local population were thinly scattered hunter-gatherers, who did not build large settlements or ceremonial mounds like their northern neighbors of the Troyville culture (400 to 700 CE) of the same time period. Ceramic analysis indicates that while they were a part of Coles Creek tradition during the Coastal Coles Creek period, these people traded with and were more influenced by the peoples of the Weeden Island cultures of the Gulf Coast and Florida panhandle than they were by the Coles Creek of northern Louisiana and Mississippi.

Excavations at the site have found ceramic workshops and examples of elite pottery and other goods. Examination of midden deposits on the mound summits and flanks and elsewhere at the site indicates that those who lived on top of the mounds enjoyed more and better food resources than the people who did not live atop the mounds, further indicating their elite status. Based on his excavations at the site in 1986, Dr. Ian Brown has speculated that the sudden appearance of substructure mound building, new pottery styles, and a burgeoning elite class may have signaled a population intrusion or, at the very least, an inspiration from outside the area, although this has not yet been confirmed.

== Excavations ==
The first archaeological investigations of the site were in 1926, undertaken by Henry B. Collins, Jr., assistant entomologist for the Smithsonian Institution. He found several different varieties of pottery at the site, as well as human burials, some of which showed signs of artificial cranial deformation with pronounced fronto-occipital flattening of the skull. The southernmost mound, Mound 4, was leveled in the mid-1950s during the construction of LA 82. The site was next surveyed in 1979 by Dr. Ian Brown and Richard S. Fuller, Jr. for the Lower Mississippi Survey undertaken by the Peabody Museum of Archaeology and Ethnology. After plans for leveling of some of the mounds by the landowner in 1985, and the subsequent discovery of the "Morgan effigy" in Mound 2 fill dirt, emergency salvage archaeology was undertaken at the site in 1986 by Brown, Richard Fuller, and Diane Fuller.

=== Morgan effigy ===
A carved deer antler figure known as the "Morgan effigy" was found in fill dirt taken by the landowner in 1985 from one of the mounds. The artistic stylization of the small sculpture shows it to have been a human death figure. The presence of bones in the same fill dirt means it may have been interred with a prominent member of the community. It is the only known Coles Creek culture artwork to be found that is not made from ceramic. The effigy is part of a permanent display at the Alliance Center in nearby downtown Abbeville, Louisiana. A drawing of it is used as the logo for the Vermilion Historical Society.

=== Nearby sites ===
Other smaller non-mound sites in the area have also produced material from the Coastal Coles Creek period. Investigations in 1946 by Robert Wauchope at the Little Pecan Island Site (16 CM 43), near Grand Chenier, Louisiana in Cameron Parish, produced ceramic chronologies dating to between 800 and 1100 CE. A number of flexed burials were also found at the site.

== See also ==
- Bayou Grande Cheniere Mounds
- Culture, phase, and chronological table for the Mississippi Valley
