= Little Pecan Island Site =

- Location within Louisiana today
- 29°47′41.676″N 92°47′37.896″W
- Cultures: Coastal Coles Creek culture
- Location: Grand Chenier, LouisianaUSA
- Region: Cameron Parish, Louisiana

History
- Built: 800 CE
- Abandoned: 1100 CE

Site notes
- Excavation dates: 1946
- Archaeologists: Robert Wauchope

The Little Pecan Island Site (16 CM 43) is an archaeological site of the Coastal Coles Creek culture, occupied by Native Americans from 800 to 1100 CE near Grand Chenier, Louisiana in Cameron Parish. Investigations by Robert Wauchope in 1946 produced a number of flexed burials and ceramic chronologies which helped determine the age and cultural affiliation of the site.

The site is situated on a low sandy ridge about 3 miles (4.8 km) in length and less than 1,500 feet (460 m) in width at its maximum extent and is surrounded on its north and east by Little Pecan Lake. It lies about 5 miles (8.0 km) to the northeast from Grand Chenier Ridge.

== See also ==
- Morgan Mounds
- Culture, phase, and chronological table for the Mississippi Valley
