= Kulubá =

Ancient Maya city

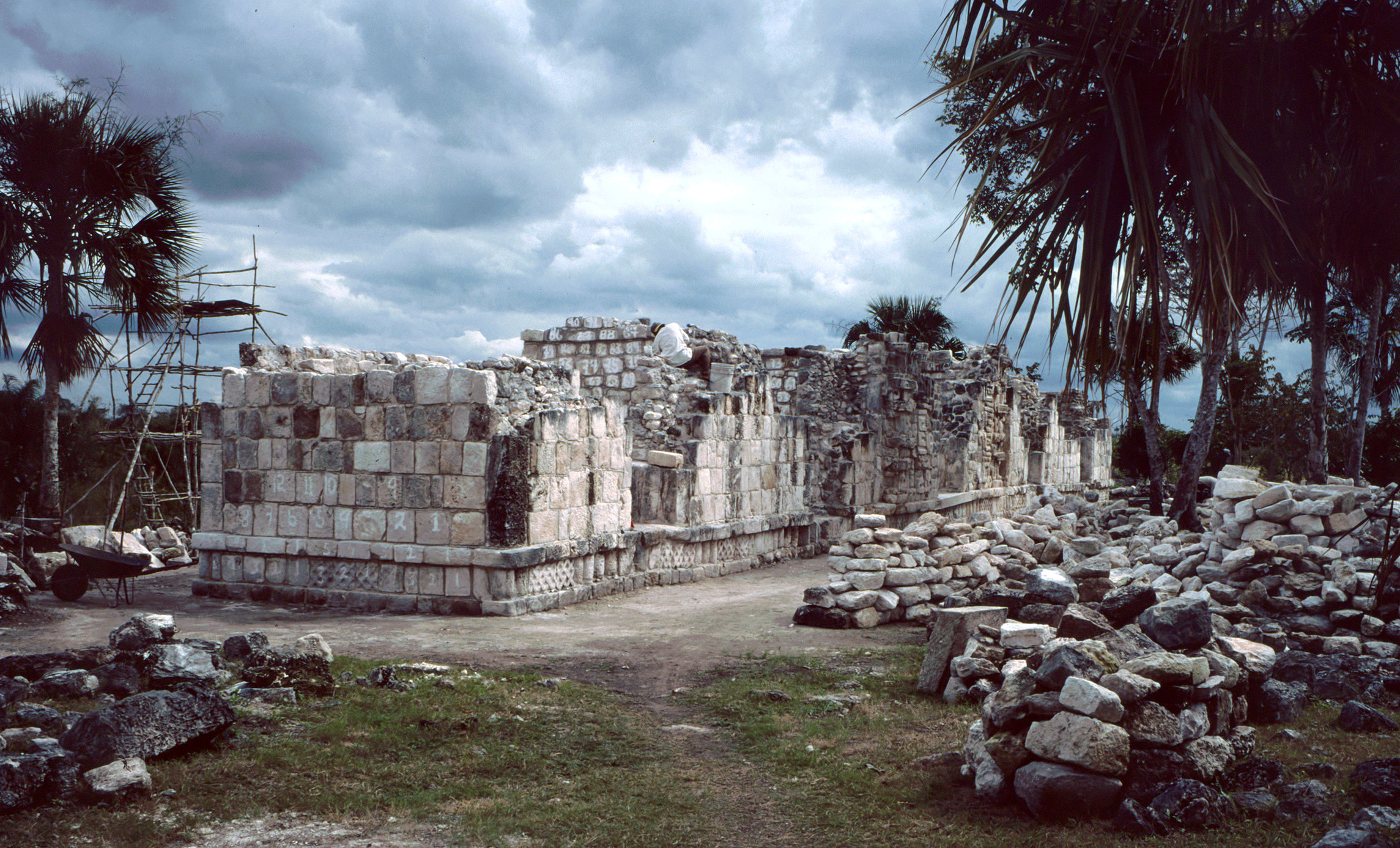
- Restoration of the site underway

- Location within Mesoamerica Kulubá (Yucatán (state))
- 21.0728767°N 87.8466797°W
- Periods: Late Classic to Early Postclassic
- Cultures: Maya civilization
- Location: Yucatán, Mexico
- Region: Yucatán

Kulubá is an ancient Maya civilization city and archeological site in Mexico. It is located in Tizimín Municipality, northeast Yucatan, Mexico. The site contains a palace, an altar, ruins of two residences, and a round structure believed to be an oven. The palace measures 6 metres (20 ft) tall, 55 metres (180 ft) long and 15 metres (49 ft) wide, and is believed to have been inhabited between 600-1050 CE.

A 1,000-year old Maya palace was discovered in Kulubá in 1939, by American archeologist Wyllys Andrews.

== Etymology ==
According to the Mayan language specialist, William Brito Sansores (The writing of the Maya, 1981), the name Kulubá, consists of the words K'ulu', which refers to a species of wild dog, and ha', water, that is, "water of kulu"

Transliteration of the Maya language has yielded several spelling variations. The name Kulubá has been commonly used in the 21st century. Andrews titled his initial article 'Culuba', starting with a C and omitting any accent on the a.

== Site contents ==
Kulubá consists of three main architectural structures. They are believed to be residential sets of important lineages. Next to these have been stone alignments that were probably the foundations of large wooden structures. The site is about 6 kilometres (3.7 mi) in diameter and some 300 smaller structures had been discovered by 2009.

=== Group C ===
The main structure, called Group C, was discovered in the winter of 1939–1940. It is built on a base of two meters high and measures 70 by 80 metres (230 by 260 ft). The main building is the Masquerade Palace, a vaulted creak divided into six rooms. The main frieze has been lost, but it is known that in the corners there were Snakes of Toltec style and that the panels of the walls contained Chaac masks, with a clear influence of Chichen Itza .

=== Group B ===
On one platform stands the six-room building, the partially well-preserved back of which has a facade design that combines many elements of the Puuc style, but in a form that can be found both in the late Uxmal style and in Chichen Itza. For this purpose, the crumpled sembfelt sembrooms of the tripartite plinth are as characteristic as the cascades of Chaac masks, which are not, as in the Puuc style, related to striking architectural points, such as entrances and corners, and the division of the upper wall surface into fields with different décor. The south side of the building is badly damaged and no longer has any recognizable facade details.

At the right angle to the described building is another one with five rooms, from which the entrance to the middle is reminiscent of the Chenes-style snake-mouthed portals. The tripartite base with alternating smooth surfaces, sifting groups and fields with slanted grids corresponds to the mammalian style of the Puuc.

=== Group A ===
The only well-preserved structure of this group consists of five rooms in a row, with another arranged behind the larger central space. This floor plan is common in Chaac style. The facade decoration of the entire wall surfaces with cladding stones, which have a roughly horseshoe-shaped pattern, is atypical.

== History of rediscovery ==
The first modern rediscovery efforts began in the winter of 1939 to 1940, with Wyllys Andrews' trip to the Yucatan specifically to explore the site. In 1965, Victor Segovia Pinto visited the site, and in 1980, the INAH Yucatan Center began restoration. In 2017 and 2018, significant funds were allocated to its restoration. Scientists were exploring a possible reforestation of the area to protect it from weather damage.
