= Zacualpa =

Zacualpa Sacualpa
- Municipality
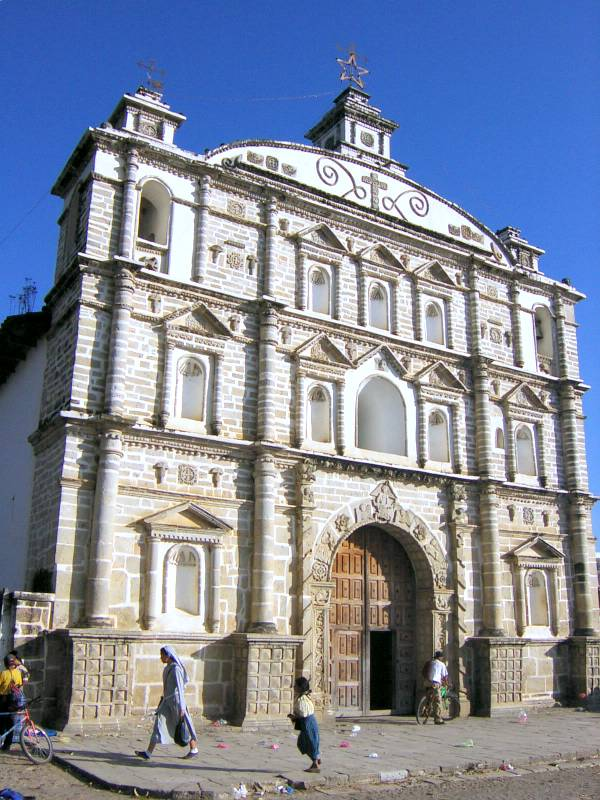
- Main church

- Location in Guatemala
- Coordinates: 15°01′38″N 90°52′40″W
- Country: Guatemala
- Department: El Quiché
- Municipality: Zacualpa

Government
  - Type: Municipal

Area
  - Municipality: 137 km^{2} (53 sq mi)
- Elevation: 1,486 m (4,875 ft)

Population (Census 2018)
  - Municipality: 32,750
  - Density: 239/km^{2} (619/sq mi)
  - Urban: 5,603
  - Ethnicities: K'iche' Ladino
  - Religions: Roman Catholicism Evangelicalism Maya
- Climate: Cwb

Zacualpa (Spanish pronunciation: [saˈkwalpa]) is a town and municipality in the Guatemalan department of El Quiché.

== Etymology ==
Many place names in Guatemala, including the name of the country, are Nahuatl names imposed by the conquering Spaniards, using words given to them by their Mexican allies. Sac in Maya means white, however, and the legend is that the white sediments in the banks and hills above the Polochic River are the origin of Sac Wal B'a. As of 1850, the British were calling Zacualpa, Sacualpa. Both spellings are still found informally.

== History ==
=== Pre-colonial ===
Zacualpa has its origins as a prominent Maya city in the Guatemalan highlands. Much of the research surrounding the site was undergone by American archaeologist Robert Wauchope who excavated the site from 1935–36 and again in 1947. Based on ceramic analysis, Zacualpa existed as early as the regional "Balan phase" (317 - 633) and was contemporaneous with the influential Maya cities of the Middle Classic (550-700). It later survived the events leading to the classic Maya collapse and features in the Postclassic as the early capital of the Chajoma, a Kaqchikel-speaking Maya people, recorded in the Annals of the Cakchiquels. The kingdom of the Chajoma was at one point considered one of the main three powers in the highlands, alongside the K'iche of Q'umarkaj and the Kaqchikel proper at Iximche. In the early 1400s, Iximche began a campaign of expansion which threatened the Chajoma as the Kaqchikel began annexing Chajoma towns. Relocating their capital to more defensive positions, the Chajoma moved first to the town of Ochal and then to the site known as Jilotepeque Viejo around 1450, but were still conquered by the Kaqchikels shortly afterward. Meanwhile, the now-small town of Zacualpa had been taken by Q'umarkaj around 1425.

=== Monastery and doctrine of the Dominican Order ===
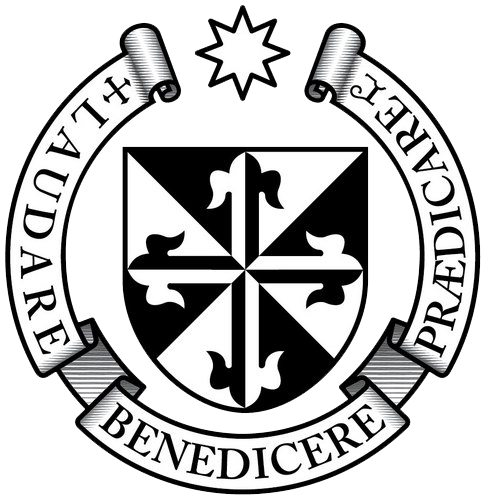
Dominican Order coat of arms.

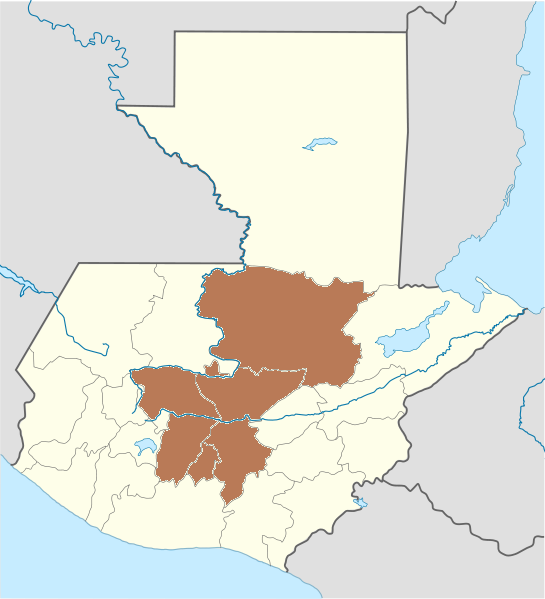
Dominican Order convents during the Spanish colony en Guatemala and the approximate area of their surrounding doctrines

After the conquest, the Spanish crown focused on the Catholic indoctrination of the natives. Human settlements founded by royal missionaries in the New World were called "Indian doctrines" or simply "doctrines". Originally, friars had only temporary missions: teach the Catholic faith to the natives, and then transfer the settlements to secular parishes, just like the ones that existed in Spain at the time; the friars were supposed to teach Spanish and Catholicism to the natives. And when the natives were ready, they could start living in parishes and contribute with mandatory tithing, just like the people in Spain.

But this plan never materialized, mainly because the Spanish crown lost control of the regular orders as soon as their friars set course to America. Shielded by their apostolic privileges granted to convert natives into Catholicism, the missionaries only responded to their order local authorities, and never to that of the Spanish government or the secular bishops. The orders local authorities, in turn, only dealt with their own order and not with the Spanish crown. Once a doctrine had been established, the protected their own economic interests, even against those of the King and thus, the doctrines became Indian towns that remains unaltered for the rest of the Spanish colony.

The doctrines were founded at the friars discretion, given that they were completely at liberty to settle communities provided the main purpose was to eventually transfer it as a secular parish which would be tithing of the bishop. In reality, what happened was that the doctrines grew uncontrollably and were never transferred to any secular parish; they formed around the place where the friars had their monastery and from there, they would go out to preach to settlements that belong to the doctrine and were called "annexes", "visits" or "visit towns". Therefore, the doctrines had three main characteristics:

1. they were independent from external controls (both ecclesiastical and secular)
2. were run by a group of friars
3. had a relatively larger number of annexes.

The main characteristic of the doctrines was that they were run by a group of friars, because it made sure that the community system would continue without any issue when one of the members died.

In 1638, the Dominican Order split their large doctrines —which meant large economic benefits for them— in groups centered around each one of their six monasteries; Zacualpa's doctrine was assigned to the Sacapulas Convent. In 1754, the Dominican Order had to transfer all of their doctrines and convents to the secular clergy, as part of the Bourbon reforms.

=== 21st century ===
On 8 October 2015, the elected mayor from LIDER, Sabino Ervin Calachij Gutiérrez, and his father, former mayor Ernesto Calachij Riz, were sent to prison along three other suspects accused of tentative first degree murder.

== Climate ==
Zacualpa has a subtropical highland climate (Köppen: Cwb)

Climate data for Zacualpa
Month	Jan	Feb	Mar	Apr	May	Jun	Jul	Aug	Sep	Oct	Nov	Dec	Year
Mean daily maximum °C (°F)	20.0 (68.0)	21.3 (70.3)	22.6 (72.7)	23.4 (74.1)	23.1 (73.6)	21.8 (71.2)	21.6 (70.9)	22.0 (71.6)	21.8 (71.2)	21.0 (69.8)	20.8 (69.4)	20.4 (68.7)	21.7 (71.0)
Daily mean °C (°F)	14.4 (57.9)	15.1 (59.2)	16.2 (61.2)	17.2 (63.0)	17.7 (63.9)	17.3 (63.1)	16.9 (62.4)	16.7 (62.1)	16.8 (62.2)	16.2 (61.2)	15.3 (59.5)	14.7 (58.5)	16.2 (61.2)
Mean daily minimum °C (°F)	8.8 (47.8)	8.9 (48.0)	9.9 (49.8)	11.1 (52.0)	12.4 (54.3)	12.9 (55.2)	12.2 (54.0)	11.5 (52.7)	11.8 (53.2)	11.5 (52.7)	9.9 (49.8)	9.1 (48.4)	10.8 (51.5)
Average precipitation mm (inches)	11 (0.4)	7 (0.3)	14 (0.6)	36 (1.4)	95 (3.7)	252 (9.9)	192 (7.6)	182 (7.2)	200 (7.9)	133 (5.2)	52 (2.0)	10 (0.4)	1,184 (46.6)
Source: Climate-Data.org

== Geographic location ==
Zacualpa is completely surrounded by Quiché Department municipalities:

== See also ==
- List of places in Guatemala

== Notes and references ==
=== Bibliography ===
- Belaubre, Christopohe (2001). "Poder y redes sociales en Centroamérica: el caso de la Orden de los Dominicos (1757-1829)" (PDF). Mesoamérica (in Spanish). 41. Archived from the original (PDF) on 21 January 2015.
- Carmack, Robert M. (2001). "La Verdadera Identificación de Mixco Viejo". Kik'aslemaal le K'iche'aab': Historia Social de los K'iche's [Social History of the K'iche's: The True Identification of Mixco Viejo] (in Spanish). Guatemala: Iximulew. pp. 143–176. ISBN 99922-56-19-2. OCLC 47220876.
- Fox, John W. (2008) [1987]. Maya Postclassic state formation. Cambridge, UK and New York, USA: Cambridge University Press. ISBN 978-0-521-10195-0. OCLC 297146853.
- Juarros, Domingo (1818). Compendio de la historia de la Ciudad de Guatemala (in Spanish). Guatemala: Ignacio Beteta.
- Hill, Robert M. II (1996). "Eastern Chajoma (Cakchiquel) Political Geography: Ethnohistorical and archaeological contributions to the study of a Late Postclassic highland Maya polity". Ancient Mesoamerica. 7. New York: Cambridge University Press: 63–87. doi:10.1017/s0956536100001292. ISSN 0956-5361. OCLC 88113844.
- Hill, Robert M. II (June 1998). "Los Otros Kaqchikeles: Los Chajomá Vinak". Mesoamérica (in Spanish). 35. Antigua Guatemala: El Centro de Investigaciones Regionales de Mesoamérica (CIRMA) in conjunction with Plumsock Mesoamerican Studies, South Woodstock, VT: 229–254. ISSN 0252-9963. OCLC 7141215.
- van Oss, Adriaan C. (1986). Catholic Colonialism: A Parish History of Guatemala, 1524-1821. Cambridge, UK: Cambridge University Press. ISBN 9780521527125.
