= Balankanche =

Maya cave site in Yucatán, Mexico

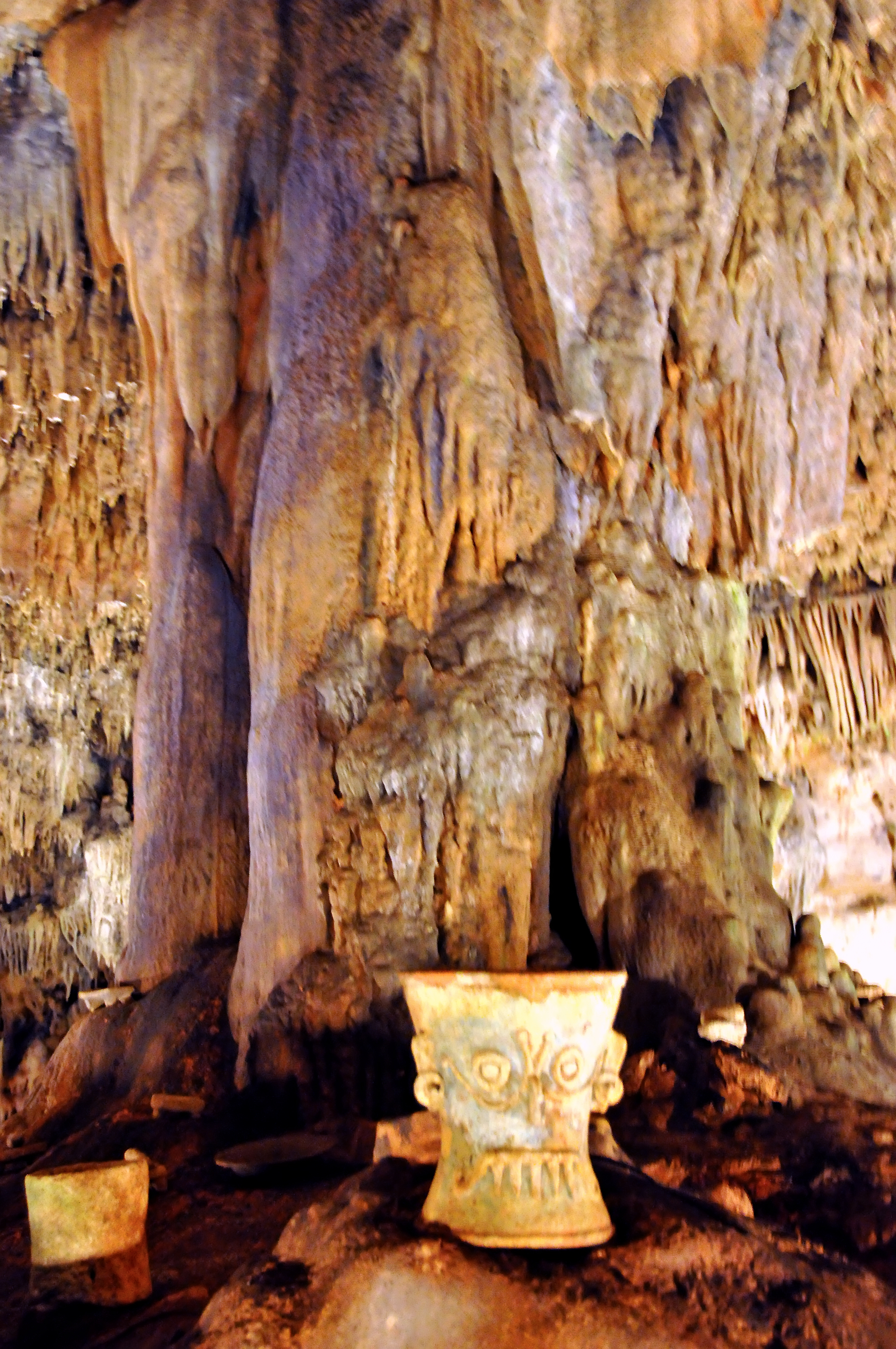
Postclassic censer with Tlaloc face

Balankanche (also Balancanche, Balaamcanche, Balaancanche) is an ancient Maya cave site lying at short distance from the archaeological Maya-Toltec city of Chichen Itza, Yucatan. For more than two thousand years, it has been the focus of rituals dedicated to the Maya rain god, Chaac, and, in the Post-Classic period, also to his Toltec counterpart, Tlaloc. The cave complex was visited by Edward Thompson and Alfred Tozzer in 1905 and has since 1932 been explored and studied by various Mexican and US scholars. Small buildings and platforms surrounded the cave's entrance; inside, stairs, walls, altars and ritual displays of ceramics (especially censers) and small stone implements were discovered. The site has been made accessible for tourists.

Plan of the Balankanche caves

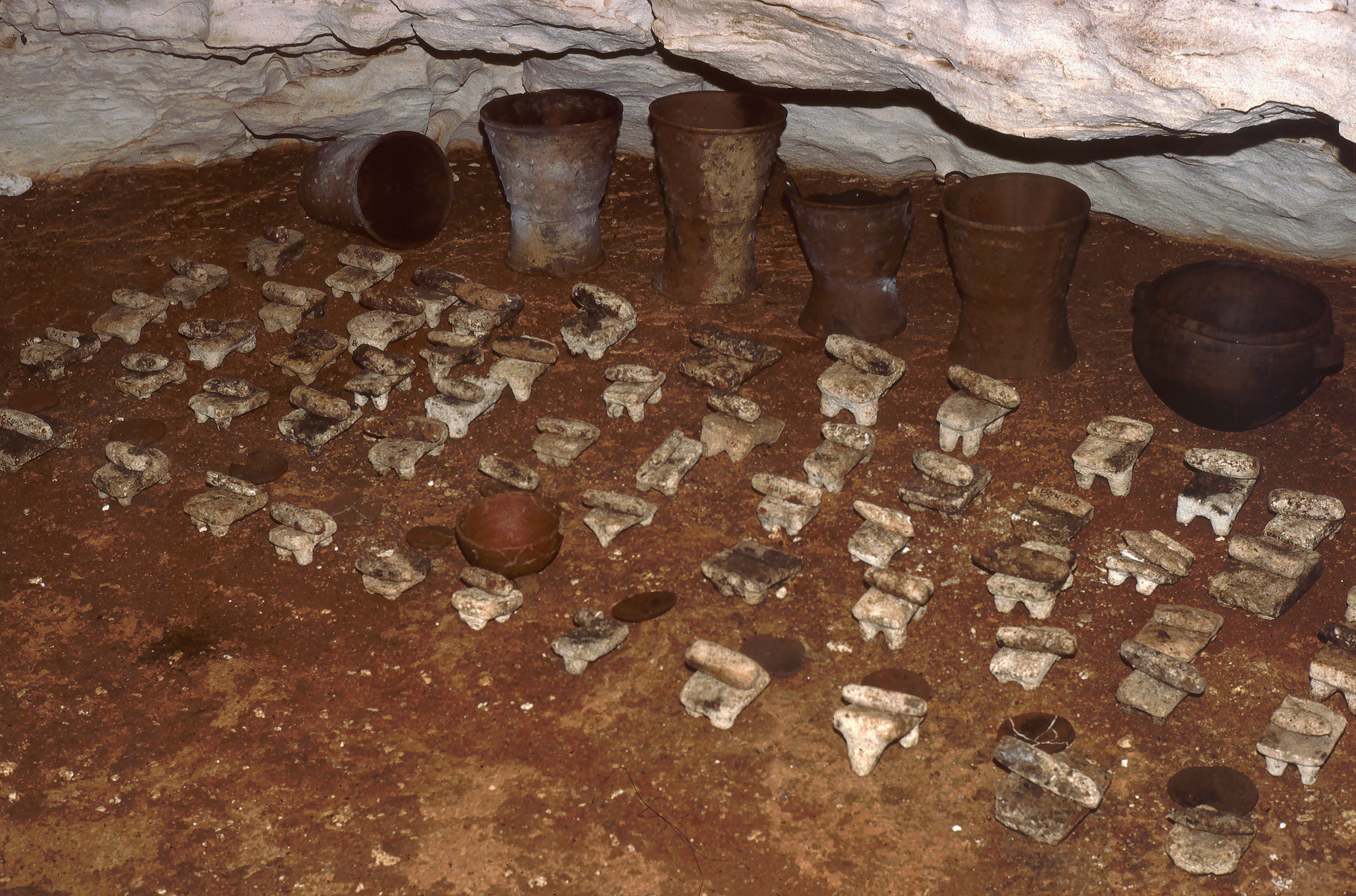
Miniature stone implements for processing the maize

== Bibliography ==
- Bruce Rogers, Grutas de Balancanche. // AMCS Activities Newsletter No. 27 , May 2004. pp. 79–83.
- E. Wyllys Andrews IV. Balankanche, Throne of the Tiger Priest. Tulane University, 1970. ISBN 0-939238-36-5.
- Grutas de Balancanché / Balancanche Caves 24/ I /'10 on YouTube
