= Robert Wauchope (archaeologist) =

Robert Wauchope (December 10, 1909 – January 20, 1979) was an American archaeologist and anthropologist, whose academic research specialized in the prehistory and archaeology of Latin America, Mesoamerica, and the Southwestern United States.

== Personal life ==
Wauchope was born to George Armstrong Wauchope and Elizabeth Bostedo Wauchope in Columbia, South Carolina on December 10, 1909. In 1941, he married Elizabeth (Betty) B Brown. Betty and Robert were married until his death. They later had two children, Kenneth (deceased) and Betsy. Wauchope died on January 26, 1979, in New Orleans, Louisiana where he had been residing for more than thirty years. After his passing, his body was donated to Tulane University to help further their research. Wauchope is also an uncle of underwater archaeologist George F. Bass.

== Education ==
Wauchope attended high school in South Carolina where he took an early interest in archaeology while on his way to becoming an Eagle Scout. Upon graduating high school, he attended University of South Carolina. While attending school here, he was nominated as a Rhodes Scholar in the year 1927. Wauchope did not win, but the nomination was all the honor. From the university, Wauchope received a bachelor's degree in English in the year 1931. Later that same year, he enrolled at Harvard University and continued his interests in archaeology. In 1938, he received his PhD in Anthropology from Harvard and afterward began teaching . In 1948, Wauchope received an honorary degree of doctor of laws from the University of South Carolina while he was working for Tulane University.

== Professional career ==
Upon his graduation from Harvard, Wauchope became a professor at the University of Georgia teaching anthropology courses, as well as Southeastern prehistory. He held this position for 18 months between the years 1939 and 1941. He is noted for being the first archaeology professor at the University of Georgia. He also developed and ran the first archaeology laboratory at the university. Shortly after his time at the University of Georgia, he was hired at the University of North Carolina-Chapel Hill. Here he served as an associate professor of anthropology, as well as the director of the Laboratory of Anthropology and Archaeology. In 1942, once he had left North Carolina, Wauchope started his career at Tulane University located in New Orleans, Louisiana. However, once World War II began, the Office of Strategic Services (OSS) started to hire many Harvard graduates. Wauchope happened to be one of these graduates and he served with the OSS in the Mediterranean area until the end of the war. He still held his position at Tulane during the time of his service.

Wauchope spent the rest of his professional career at Tulane. Here, he served as the director of the Middle American Research Institute (M.A.R.I.) from his first year in 1942 until 1975. Though he stepped down as the M.A.R.I. director, he continued to teach at the university for two more years, officially retiring in 1977. During his time at Tulane, Wauchope taught a multidisciplinary Middle America research program with weekly seminars, working with other Latin America scholars at Tulane. He also changed the focus of M.A.R.I. from archaeological research back to anthropology during the 1960s. Wauchope was also credited with building a foundation and picking early staff for Tulane University. In 1967, he took lead in separating the sociology and anthropology departments. To this day, the two are still separate and seen as different career paths due to the work that Wauchope did in the 60s. Wauchope was respected for his long and eventful time with the university.

When Wauchope stepped down as the director of M.A.R.I., he passed on his duties to one of his former co-worker's son named E. Wyllys Andrews V. Andrews ended up serving as director longer than Wauchope did by one year. Today, Tulane University honors Wauchope by not only including him on their M.A.R.I. website and Wikipedia page, but also by having an award in his name. This award is named the Robert Wauchope Award for Excellence in Anthropology.

== Field work ==
Wauchope's field work began shortly after graduating high school when he wrote Alfred V. Kidder and asked to join him on excavations at Pecos, New Mexico. Kidder accepted Robert's request and invited him to be an assistant at the Forked Lightning Ruin site. He joined Kidder in New Mexico after attending college for one semester. Wauchope also accompanied Kidder in 1927 when they attended the first Pecos conference where he met H.S and C.B Cosgrove. They were both a part of the museum staff at Harvard University. When they met Wauchope, they invited him to their 1928 and 1929 excavations at Stallings Island, Georgia. Here, he assisted them in excavating the area surrounding the Savannah River.

In 1932, the Carnegie Institution for Science sent him to, once again, assist Alfred V. Kidder, but this time in Uaxactun, Guatemala. Wauchope is noted for his extensive work on house mounds here. The study of these sites is one of the most extensive of its kind, pertaining to household archaeology of the Maya area and modern Maya houses. This trip is where his earliest publications come from. His work here was the first of its kind and is still one of the most important surveys of Mayan housing that is available to archaeologists. After this excavation, he went on to do two more research trips for the Carnegie Institute. One nine-month endeavor to conduct archaeological and ethnological surveys of more Mayan houses in Yucatán, Campeche, Quintana Roo, and Guatemala. In the years 1935 and 1936, Wauchope was involved in archaeological research in the Guatemalan Highlands around Zacualpa.

While teaching at the University of Georgia, Wauchope was approached by the Works Progress Administration (WPA) and was put in charge of a group of other WPA employees to conduct surveys of all known archaeological sites of Northern Georgia. He surveyed over 200 sites north of Macon, and excavated 23 sites in Macon, Savannah, Stallings Island, and at Etowah. In addition to setting up the state's first detailed archaeological site file. While he was surveying with his team, he discovered one of the most densely packed archeological sites that lie within the state of Georgia and of North America. This is called Nacoochee Valley and he spent nearly a year here before returning full time to his teaching position. He played a large part in developing the ceramic sequence for north Georgia during the two years he was there.

In 1947, Wauchope decided to continue his work from the years 1935 and 1936. He returned to Zacualpa in Guatemala to finish his research of the central highlands area. He was still at Tulane University at this time and his research helped to further the Middle American Research Institute (M.A.R.I) program. After his field work in 1947, he did not participate in anymore until his final years serving as the director of the M.A.R.I program in 1974 and 1975. Even though he was not directly involved in the field work, the M.A.R.I program furthered their work in the field in Wauchope's absence. With his final work, he returned to Guatemala where he had spent much of his career. Here he studied many different cities at small sites located near Asunción Mita.

== Published works ==
At Tulane, the M.A.R.I published more than 60 volumes of work. 31 of these published volumes were either edited or written by Wauchope. During the 1950s, Wauchope was asked to be the general editor of Handbook of Middle American Indians. The Handbook was assembled at Tulane. The last four of which were guides to sources on Middle American (more currently called Mesoamerican) ethnohistory. It was published by the University of Texas Press from 1964 to 1976 with Margaret Harrison and Howard F. Cline both doing additional edits to the Handbook. These 16 volumes were amongst the M.A.R.I program's most notable pieces. Many of his works come directly from his fieldwork and other research he had done over his time as an archaeologist or professor. His research done in Guatemala was amongst some of his first publications. His work was and is a part of the basis for anthropology and archaeology academia.

Some of Wauchope's most well-known works include:

- House Mounds of Uaxactun, Guatemala; Published 1934,
- Modern Maya Houses: A Study of Their Archaeological Significance; Published in 1938 and Republished in 2007,
- Excavations at Zacualpa, Guatemala; Published in 1949,
- Implications of Radiocarbon Dates from Middle and South America; Published in 1954,
- Ten Years of Middle American Archaeology Annotated Bibliography and News Summary. 1948-1957; Published in 1961,
- They Found Buried Cities: Exploration and Excavation in the American Tropics; Published in 1965,
- Archaeological Survey of Northern Georgia with a Test of Some Cultural Hypotheses; Published in 1966,
- The Indian Background of Latin American History; Published in 1970,
- Zacuapla, El Quiche, Guatemala, An Ancient Provincial Center of the Highland Maya; Published in 1975, and
- Lost Tribes and Sunken Continents: Myth and Method in the Study of American Indians; Published in 1975.

With all other publications, Wauchope's total number of papers, books, editor titles, and publishing director titles total up to over 200. This includes multiple pieces that were published posthumously. Many of his works were published by universities such as University of Chicago, Tulane University, and Cambridge University.
