= Tell el-Hesi =

Archaeological site in Southern District, Israel

- תל חסי (Hebrew)
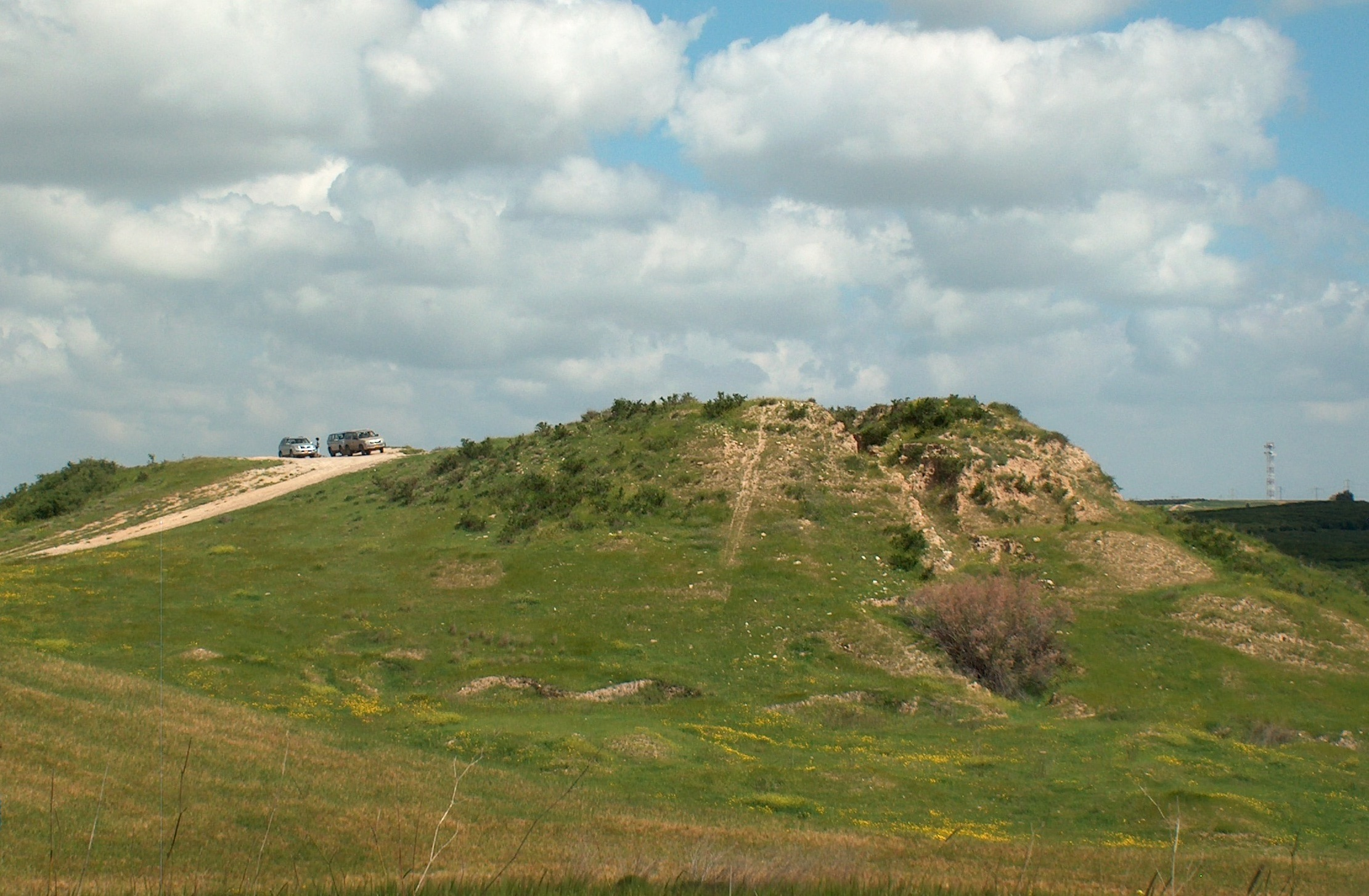
- Tell el-Hesi

- Location within Israel
- 31°32′52″N 34°43′49″E
- Type: Settlement
- Location: Southern District, Israel
- Region: Levant

Site notes
- Condition: In ruins

Tell el-Hesi (Hebrew: תל חסי), or Tell el-Hesy, is a 10 hectares (25 acres) archaeological site in Israel. It was the first major site excavated in Palestine, first by Flinders Petrie in 1890 and later by Frederick Jones Bliss in 1891 and 1892, both sponsored by the Palestine Exploration Fund (PEF). Petrie's excavations were one of the first to systematically use stratigraphy and seriation to produce a chronology of the site. Tell el-Hesi is located southwest of the modern Israeli city of Qiryat Gat.

== History ==
The site was occupied from the Pre-Pottery Neolithic period to the Hellenistic period, though not continuously.

=== Early Bronze Age ===
==== Early Bronze IIIA ====
Tell el-Hesi had its main occupation in the Early Bronze Age. Settlement seems to have started at the beginning of the EB IIIA or earlier. Radiocarbon dating of emmer samples calibrated to 2890-2590 and 2900-2620 BC. By the EB IIIA (c. 2750-2500 BCE) the fortified city that reached a size of 10 hectares (25 acres). It was located along the Wadi el-Hesi which was a stream at the time. The economy was based on animal husbandry (cattle herding) and grain production, at it may have been a center for trade. There were workshops for incised bone tubes.

- Contemporary with the 3rd and 4th dynaties of Egypt.

=== Late Bronze Age ===
It then fell into disuse until the middle of the 2nd millennium during the Late Bronze Age when it was rebuilt, staying in use for around a thousand years. A military trench system was dug into the top of the mound during the 1948 Arab–Israeli War.

=== Speculations about city name ===
Petrie identified Tell el-Hesi as the Biblical site of Lachish, and Bliss accepted this identification, but it is no longer accepted. In 1924 William F. Albright proposed that Tell el-Hesi was Biblical Eglon, an identification still accepted by Yohanan Aharoni in the 1970s. This identification, too, is unlikely and the site should be considered unidentified.

== Archaeology ==
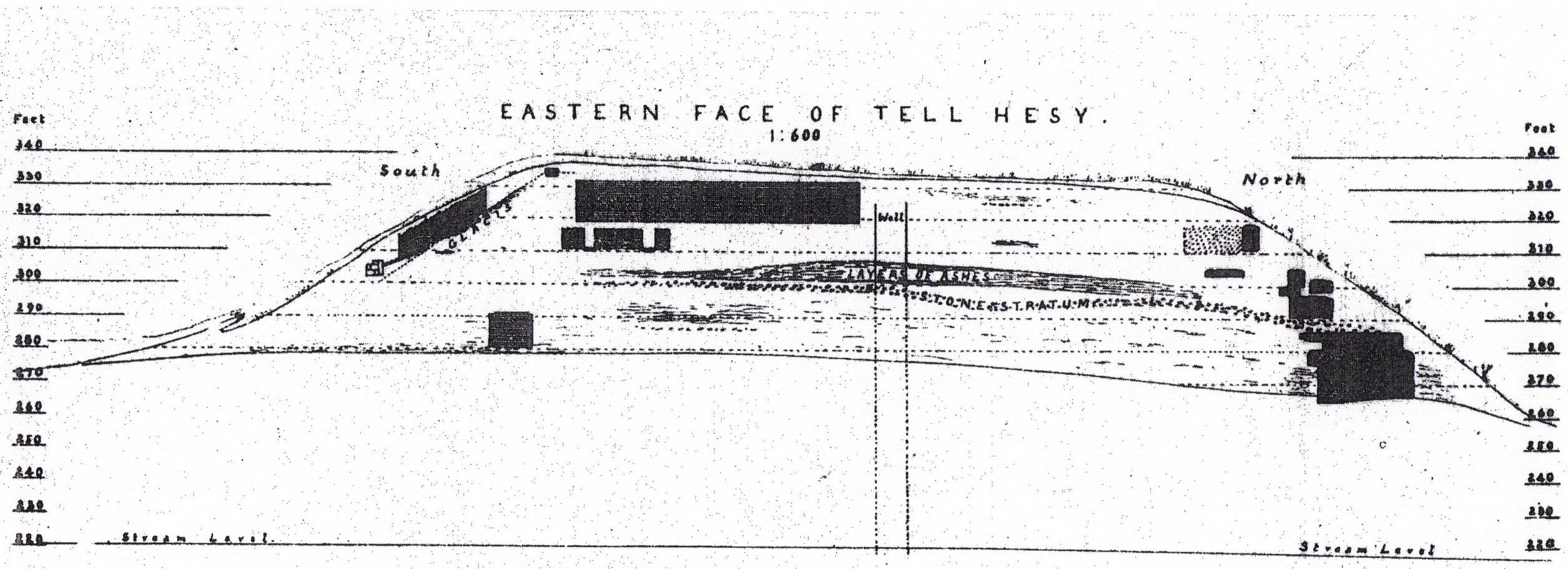
Cross section through the mound, after Flinders Petrie

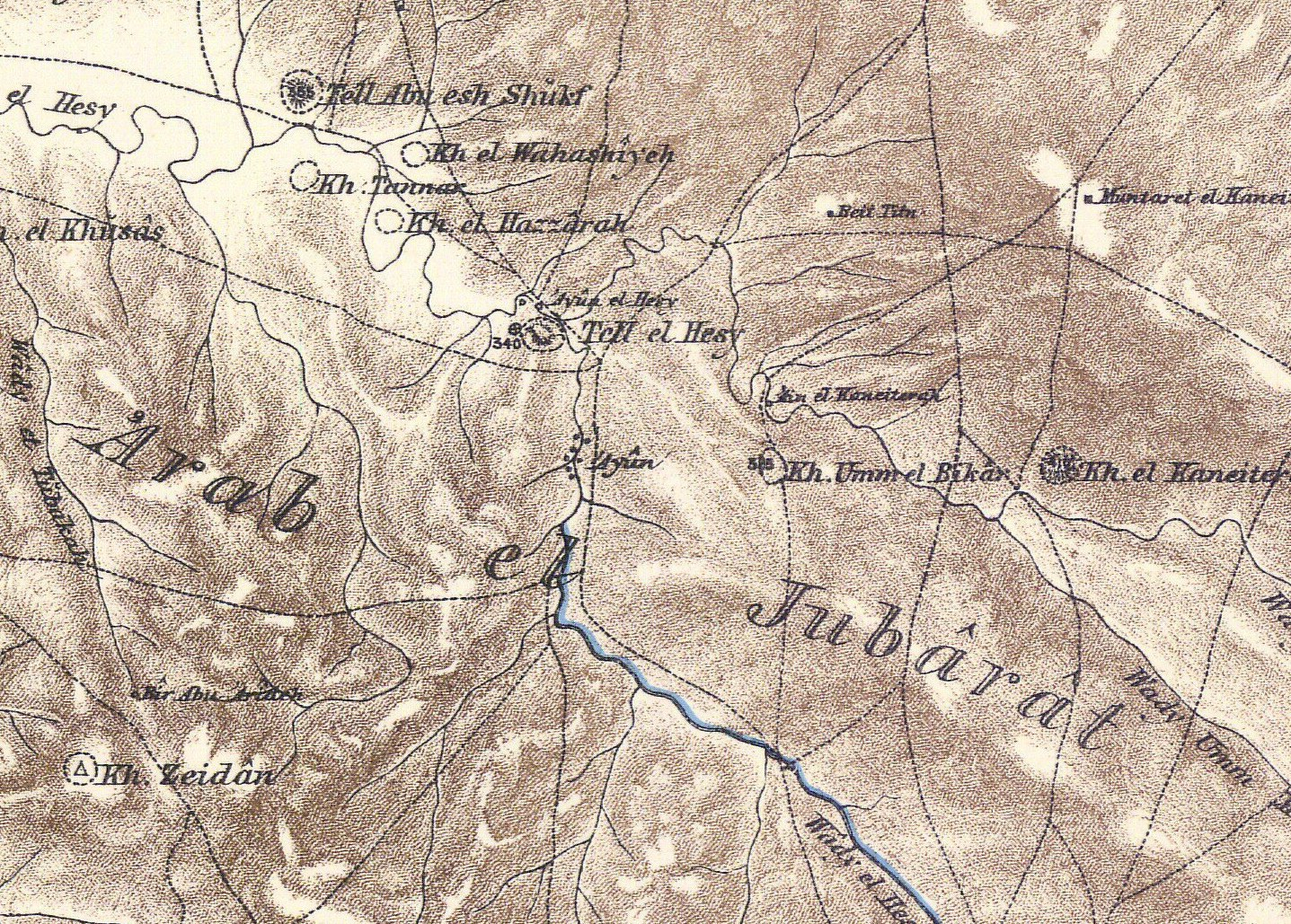
Tell el Hesy in the PEF Survey of Palestine, 1880

The site was first described in 1838 by Edward Robinson. It is 61 meters above the land in the East and 18 meters high in the other directions. The mound was roughly square with 61 meters on a side in Robinson's time but has been reduced by excavations and military action.

It was originally excavated between 1890 and 1892 by the PEF during five excavation seasons. The first season was under Petrie. After brief training under Petrie at Meydum in Egypt, Bliss began four seasons of work at Tell el-Hesi. Using Petrie's ceramic sequence and the pioneering concept of a sequence of 'cities', Bliss was able to establish not only the archaeology of this specific site, but the sequential framework for Levantine archaeology. Bliss opened a large wedge on the northeast corner of the upper tell, still visible today and known as "Bliss's Cut". The final reports were published in 1891 and 1894. Among other discoveries was the remains of what was identified as a blast furnace, with slag and ashes, which was dated to 1500 BC. If the theories of experts are correct, the use of the hot-air blast instead of cold air was known at an extremely early age. Aside from some inscribed pottery of various periods, the significant epigraphic find was a single cuneiform tablet. This tablet is closely related to the Amarna Letters and mentions a person noted as the governor of Lachish in those letters.

A second series of excavations began in 1970, at the behest of the American Schools of Oriental Research and its President G. Ernest Wright, the Joint Archaeological Expedition to Tell el-Hesi. The original core staff of directors for the project included John Worrell - Director; Lawrence Toombs - Senior Archeologist, Phillip King - Administrative Director, Tom Frank - Education Director, and W. J. Bennett Jr. and Lawrence Stager as Field Directors. The team excavated at the site from 1970 to 1983 for eight summer seasons. The project emphasized excavation in two parts of the site: the acropolis and its associated wall system (Fields I and III), and the Early Bronze III (EB III) wall system of the lower city (Fields V, VI, and IX).

Excavations on top of the tel revealed Late Ottoman infant jar-burials often associated with nomads or itinerant workers of Egyptian origins.

In 2004, the Cobb Institute of Archaeology at Mississippi State University initiated the Hesi Regional Survey project, which concluded in 2010. The "Phase IV" investigations of a nearby satellite site named Khirbet Summeily began in 2011; excavations are co-directed by Dr. James Hardin and Dr. Jeffrey Blakely and most recently occurred during the summer of 2023.

== See also ==
- Lachish
- Cities of the ancient Near East

== Bibliography ==
- Blakely, Jeffrey A.; Toombs, Lawrence E. (1985). The Joint Archaeological Expedition to Tell el-Hesi. Eisenbrauns. ISBN 978-0-931464-54-6.
- Dahlberg, Bruce T.; O'Connell, Kevin G. (29 November 1989). Tell El-Hesi: The Site and the Expedition. Eisenbrauns. ISBN 978-0-931464-57-7.
- Conder, C.R.; Kitchener, H.H. (1883). The Survey of Western Palestine: Memoirs of the Topography, Orography, Hydrography, and Archaeology. Vol. 3. London: Committee of the Palestine Exploration Fund. (pp. 261290-291)
- Eakins, J. Kenneth; Spencer, John R.; O'Connell, Kevin G. (June 1993). Tell El-Hesi: The Muslim Cemetery in Fields V and Vi/IX. Eisenbrauns. ISBN 978-0-931464-78-2.
- Guérin, V. (1869). Description Géographique Historique et Archéologique de la Palestine. Vol. 1: Judee, pt. 2. Paris, L'Imprimerie Imp. (p. 296 )
- Palmer, E.H. (1881). The Survey of Western Palestine: Arabic and English Name Lists Collected During the Survey by Lieutenants Conder and Kitchener, R. E. Transliterated and Explained by E.H. Palmer. Committee of the Palestine Exploration Fund. (p. 379)
- Robinson, E.; Smith, E. (1841). Biblical Researches in Palestine, Mount Sinai and Arabia Petraea: A Journal of Travels in the year 1838. Vol. 2. Boston: Crocker & Brewster.
- Shaw, Bynum; Paschal, George Washington; Wake Forest University (1988). Tell El-Hesi: The Site and the Expedition. Wake Forest University. ISBN 978-0-918401-01-4.
- Toombs, Lawrence E.; O'Connell, Kevin G. (1985). Tell el Hesi: modern military trenching and Muslim cemetery in field I, strata I-II. Wilfrid Laurier Univ. Press. ISBN 978-0-88920-134-7.
- Geoffrey E. Ludvik, Jeffrey A. Blakely. (2020) The Early Bronze Age of Tell el-Hesi and its environs: From Petrie's initial discovery to today's understanding. Palestine Exploration Quarterly 152:4, pages 304–331.
- Kara Larson, James W. Hardin, Sara Cody. (2020) Cultural Modification Analyses on Faunal Remains in Relation to Space Use and Direct Provisioning from Field VI EBIIIA Tell el-Hesi. Palestine Exploration Quarterly 152:4, pages 365–388.
