= Sub Rosa (Pocahontas, Mississippi) =

Historic house in Mississippi, United States

- U.S. National Register of Historic Places
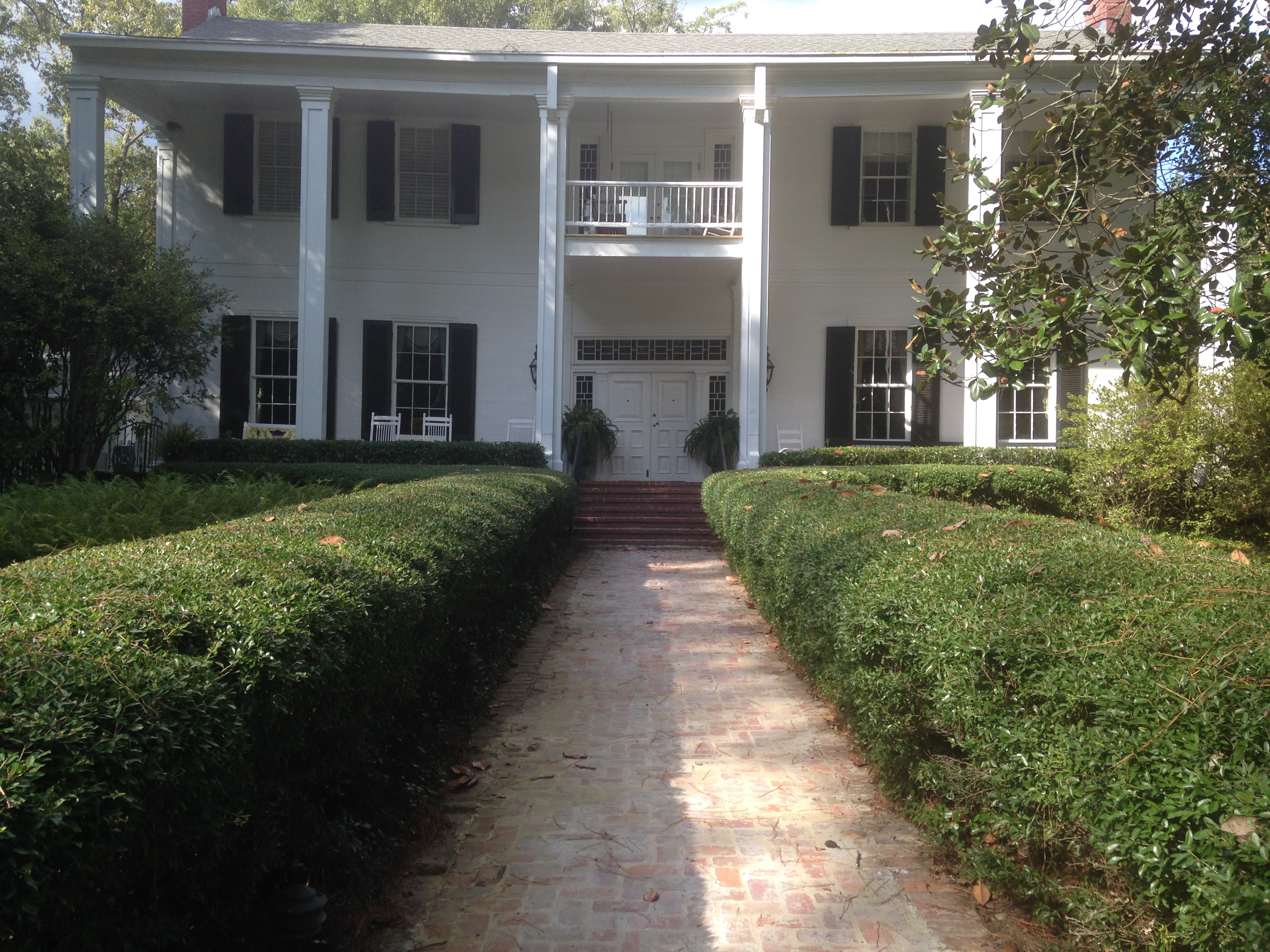
- Sub Rosa in 2016

- Location within Mississippi Location within the United States
- Nearest city: Pocahontas, Mississippi
- Area: 40 acres (16 ha)
- Built: 1854
- Architectural style: Greek Revival
- NRHP reference No.: 75001046
- Added to NRHP: April 28, 1975

Sub Rosa is a historic mansion in Pocahontas, Mississippi, U.S.. It was built for John and Margaret Greaves from 1852 to 1854, and it was designed in the Greek Revival architectural style. In 1870, in the aftermath of the American Civil War, the Greaves moved to Los Angeles, California and rented Sub Rosa to Jim Bostick. The house has been listed on the National Register of Historic Places since April 28, 1975.
