= Cobb Institute of Archaeology =

Research institute of Mississippi State University

Coordinates: 33.4548°N 88.7876°W

- Founders: Cully A. Cobb, Lois Dowdle Cobb
- Established: 1971
- Address: 340 Lee Blvd., Mississippi State, MS 39762
- Location: Mississippi State University, Starkville, Mississippi, United States
- Website: cobb.msstate.edu

The Cobb Institute of Archaeology is a non-degree granting unit within the College of Arts and Sciences at Mississippi State University (MSU). It was established in 1971 with a goal of promoting archaeological research and education at Mississippi State University. The Lois Dowdle Cobb Museum of Archaeology and its artifact collections are included in the Institute's facilities, and many of the Institute's staff have formal cross-affiliations with the Department of Anthropology and Middle Eastern Cultures. The Institute's archaeological research projects cover a wide geographic and temporal range, but focus on the cultures of the Near East and the Southeastern United States. Through collaboration with academic departments on campus, the Institute offers a wide range of opportunities for undergraduate and graduate students at Mississippi State University to engage in archaeological-related research and learning activities.

== Foundation and endowment ==
The Cobb Institute of Archaeology was established in June 1971 by Mississippi State University alumnus Cully A. Cobb and his wife, Lois Dowdle Cobb. An initial donation of just over $1 million in stock of the Ruralist Press for endowment support was made in 1971, and an additional $500,000 was donated in order to fund the construction of a building (in a letter written to then-University President William L. Giles) in July 1972. On April 14, 1973, the groundbreaking ceremony took place, and the building was officially dedicated in October 1975. Mr. Cobb died in May 1975, shortly before the Institute formally opened, but left a bequest in his will which continues to fund research there.

== Mission ==
The research staff at the Institute have focused their energies on a variety of archaeological excavations in the Middle East and the Southeastern United States, often collaborating with the Department of Anthropology and Middle Eastern Cultures at Mississippi State University to offer opportunities for student involvement in fieldwork.

== Directors ==
- E. Jerry Vardaman 1972–1988
- Joe D. Seger 1988–2014
- Michael L. Galaty 2015–2017
- Evan Peacock 2017–2018
- James W. Hardin 2018–present

== Research activities ==
Since its inception, the Cobb Institute has provided funding and assistance for archaeological research and fieldwork in the Near East, the Mediterranean Basin, the Southeastern United States, and the Caribbean.

=== Near Eastern archaeology ===
In 1980, the Roman Nabataean site of Elusa (Haluza), located in southern Israel, was the first Middle Eastern archaeological project to be sponsored by the Cobb Institute. The Hebrew University in Jerusalem was involved in one of the research seasons. In order to achieve better cooperative results, the Hebrew University provided a teaching program for the MSU students. In 1982, Jack D. Elliott, Jr. completed an associated research volume titled The Elusa Oikoumene: A Geographical Analysis of an Ancient Desert Ecosystem which the Cobb Institute published and distributed.

Joe D. Seger organized the "Lahav Research Project" (LRP) in 1974. There are four phases in this project. The first phase of the work was performed from 1976 to 1980, and the sponsorship of this phase was provided by the University of Nebraska at Omaha; the second and third phases were conducted by the Cobb Institute auspices during the period 1983–1989 and 1992–1999, respectively; and the fourth phase began in 2007 with the sponsorship of Emory University. Throughout the process, the American Schools of Oriental Research has been working with the Institute. In all phases, staff members, subscribers, and worker participants provided financial support to the consortium institutions.

The following are some of the results of this project:

- A detailed excavation report on stratigraphic data was found in the eastern side of Tel Halif
- Nine flint cores, including Canaan-style blade and sheet scraper ("fan scrapers")
- About 800 ceramic figurines, majority of them belonged to the Persian era, and some of them belonged to the Iron second period of Judah
- Many modified and whole pottery vessels were discovered in the fourth Field of Tel Halif
- On behalf of the Israel Antiquities Authority, Paul F. Jacobs directed salvage work in 1985. A three-week excavation was carried out in an area at the foot of Tel Halif, which later extended to the fields of Kibbutz Lahav. This salvage work was established as a result of the planning to build a home in the Kibbutz.

Since 2011, Dr. James Hardin has co-directed excavations at Khirbet Summeily, a satellite of Tell el-Hesi. A field school ran from 2015–2017, and returned in 2023. The field school will continue when conditions permit. The site was found by a survey field school. GIS and photogrammetry has been done at the site as well.

Surveys in Morocco have been conducted in and around Bizmoune Cave for Middle and Late Stone Age archaeological sites. This project is led by Dr. Shane Miller. Surveys have been ongoing since 2022 and have been in partnership with the University of Arizona and Institut National des Sciences de l'Archéologie et du Patrimoine (INSAP). The survey around the cave has produced multiple findings of Middle and Late Stone Age artifacts as well as slag of unknown origins. Excavations within the cave started in 2024.

=== North American archaeology ===
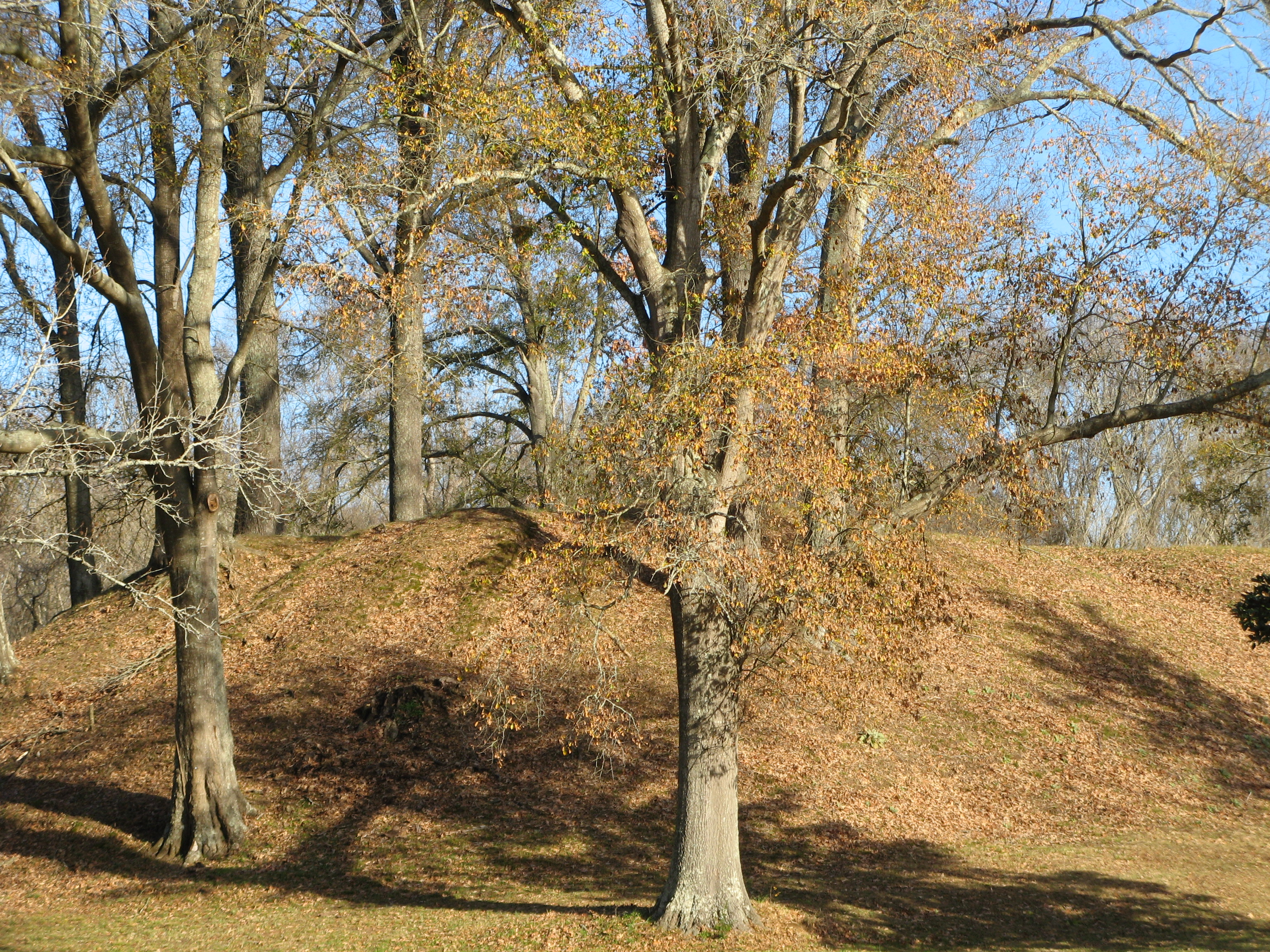
View of the Pocahontas Mound A, located in a park along U.S. Route 49 near Pocahontas in Hinds County, Mississippi, United States.

During the summer of 2004, Cobb Institute crews conducted excavations at Mound A at the Pocahontas Mounds site in Hinds County, Mississippi. The goals of the fieldwork were to delimit the site boundaries and to locate intact cultural deposits, so that the construction of a new visitor center and rest stop would not impact the site. Two mounds (A and B) at the site have been added to the National Register of Historic Places; it was occupied during both the Late Archaic and Mississippian periods.

Researchers at the Cobb Institute have conducted several archaeological investigations at the Lyon's Bluff site (22OK520). The site was first excavated by Moreau Chambers in the 1930s; Mississippi State's involvement began with Richard Marshall in the 1960s and continued with field schools supervised by Janet Rafferty and Evan Peacock in 2001 and 2003. Research in the site picked up again in 2022 with surveys and excavations and are ongoing. The fieldwork conducted at Lyon’s Bluff in 2024 is part of a collaborative effort between the Chickasaw Nation and the Cobb Institute of Archaeology at Mississippi State University to better understand the cultural landscape of northeast Mississippi, the Chickasaw homeland, during the Mississippian (AD 1000–1540) through Contact (AD 1540–1650) periods. In 2021 a National Park Service grant helped the Cobb Institute work to assess and return ancestral remains found at Lyon’s Bluff in coordination with the Native American nations of Mississippi. Dr. Shawn Lambert and co-principal investigators, Dr. Anna Osterholtz and Dr. Molly Zuckerman, consulted with all Native American nations who have cultural and historical connections to Mississippi in order to repatriate and return remains back to their respective descendant communities. This project helped showcase the value of respecting and implementing tribal cultural protocols into archaeological practice.

The Grand Village of the Natchez, also known as the Fatherland archaeological site (22Ad501), is one of the most extensively investigated sites in Mississippi. The Cobb Institute participated in fieldwork at the site during the 2019 and 2021 seasons. The project aimed to evaluate a recent map-based reconstruction of the 1730 battlefield using landscape features still visible as well as eighteenth-century maps to propose possible locations for battlefield features and ‘missing’ mounds no longer present. Investigations at the Grand Village employed remote sensing, coring, and excavation techniques. In 2024, artifacts and associated documents from the project were transferred to MDAH, who also curated materials from earlier excavations at the site. Digital files, including remote-sensing and GIS data are being archived at MDAH and the Cobb Institute of Archaeology. This project, located in Natchez Mississippi, was a collaborative effort among Mississippi State University (MSU), the University of North Carolina at Chapel Hill (UNC), the Grand Village of the Natchez Indians (GVNI), the Mississippi Department of Archives and History (MDAH), and the University of Mississippi (UM). Field investigations were conducted through the Center for Archaeological Research at UM, and the final report was completed at MSU’s Cobb Institute of Archaeology. This project was funded by the National Park Service’s American Battlefield Protection Program (ABPP).

The Butler Mound site (22LO500), in Lowndes County, is a Mississippian Period mound on a bluff above the Tombigbee River. Ongoing fieldwork conducted at Butler is part of a collaborative effort among Chickasaw Nation (CN), the Florida Museum of Natural History at the University of Florida (UF), and the Cobb Institute of Archaeology at Mississippi State University (MSU) to better understand the cultural landscape of northeast Mississippi, the Chickasaw homeland, during the Mississippian (AD 1000–1540) through Contact (AD 1540–1650) periods. Investigations at Butler can provide important information about Mississippian polities in the region prior to and at the time of Contact, although it appears that the site was not occupied during the Contact period A gradiometer survey of open areas around the mound was conducted at Butler in 2016 and 2017. Fieldwork was conducted at Butler in Summer 2017 as part of the Chickasaw Explorers program. In 2022 fieldwork continued with the goal of providing an opportunity for the Chickasaw Explorers to assist in significant archaeological field research, ascertaining the density and cultural content of archaeological deposits present at the site, and classifying artifacts, ecofacts, and features recovered for the purpose of developing interpretations. Research at the Butler Mound Site is ongoing with the 2025 Mississippi State AMEC survey field school.

== Curation ==
The Cobb Institute manages a separate 6,000-square-foot curation facility that allows for storage and analysis of archaeological research collections and records. It is one of two facilities in Mississippi that meets the requirements for curating federal collections. Its large storage area has special environmental controls and security systems.

The interior of the curation building consists of a work space of laboratory, washroom, shower bathroom, a large storage area for collections, and two front offices. The collection has two storage spaces. All shelves are made up of commercial grade adjustable steel. The lower floor is constructed of cast concrete and includes many early artifact collections and all archaeological records, the upper layer holds all atlas, negative plate, lantern slide, reports, and recent collections of artifact. The collection space has a total area of approximately 7,000 cubic feet and can accommodate approximately 6,500 TEUs, and space in some collections can also be used to store items in the process, photo filing cabinets and supplies. Two separate HVAC systems provide environmental control for curatorial laboratories and repositories: one for collections storage space and one for office and laboratory area. Annual temperature and humidity control is provided by a closed collections system. 68 degrees Fahrenheit is the standard temperature and 50% relative humidity is the standard humidity.

The campus, local police and the fire department are the main sources of security for this curation, and security measures are theft and fire alarm systems. The Intrusion Detection System consists of a motion detector, high frequency break detector, an infrared and door switches, the fire alarm system consists of detector of smoke and heat located strategically, and a flow monitor on a wet pipe sprinkler system. In addition, some of the laboratory and office areas are separated from the collections area by a two-hour firewall, and the campus police responded to the burglar alarms to alert collections staff who needed to enter . Access is limited to the director of the institute, the curator and the collection manager, who have the key and access code, except for the above persons, no one is allowed to enter the collections storage room unless they have written permission.

=== Activities ===
The Cobb Institute of Archaeology values public outreach and public archaeology, and participates in a variety of outreach opportunities throughout the year. The institute hosts lectures on topics of both the American Southeast and the Ancient Near East. Science Night at the Museums is a major annual event on the Mississippi State University campus, which features exhibits and opportunities for all ages to engage in archaeology. Dr. Tim Frank and Dylan Karges have hosted mock excavations for the public as an introduction to the discipline. The Cobb Institute also hosts several child-friendly outreach events with the local community.

=== Lois Dowdle Cobb Museum of Archaeology ===
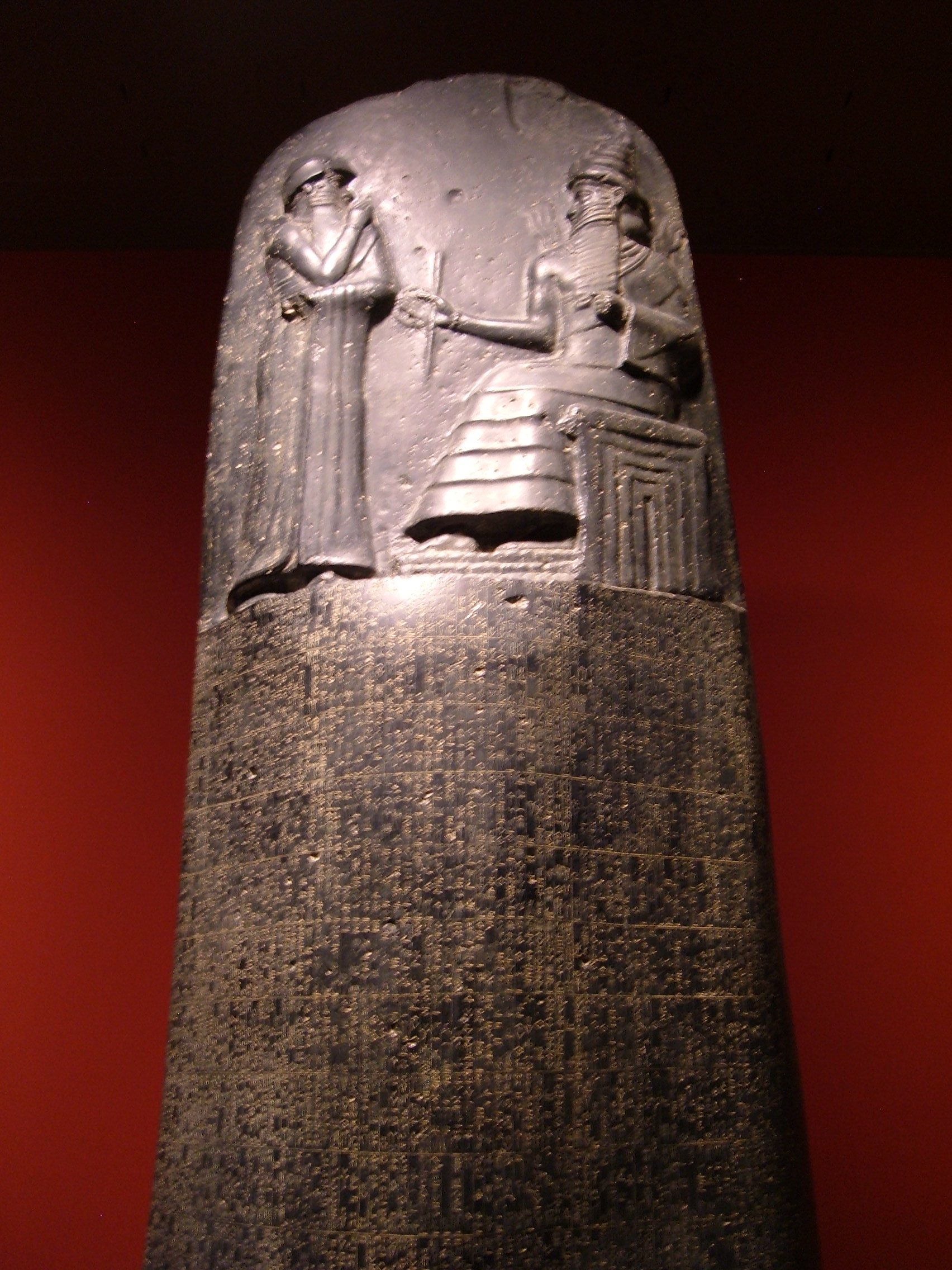
Code of Hammurabi replica stele REM

The research results of the Cobb Institute will be presented in The Lois Dowdle Cobb Museum of Archaeology. This museum not only serves as a display platform for the Cobb Institute, but also provides a lot of help for the research work of the Cobb Institute. Relevant exhibition activities will be held regularly to promote and achieve teaching results. The Lois Dowdle Cobb Museum of Archaeology mainly displays artifacts related to the Middle East and the Mediterranean.

Partial collection list：

- Ancient Eastern sculptures
- Replica of the Code of Hammurabi
- Replica of the Mesha Stele
- Replica of the Black Obelisk of Shalmaneser III
- Replica of the Rosetta Stone
- Ancient coins

== Cultural resource management services ==
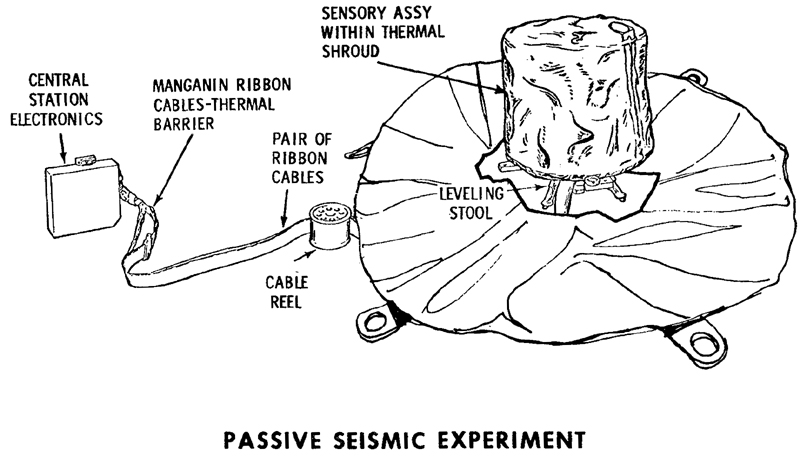
ALSEP Passive Seismic Experiment

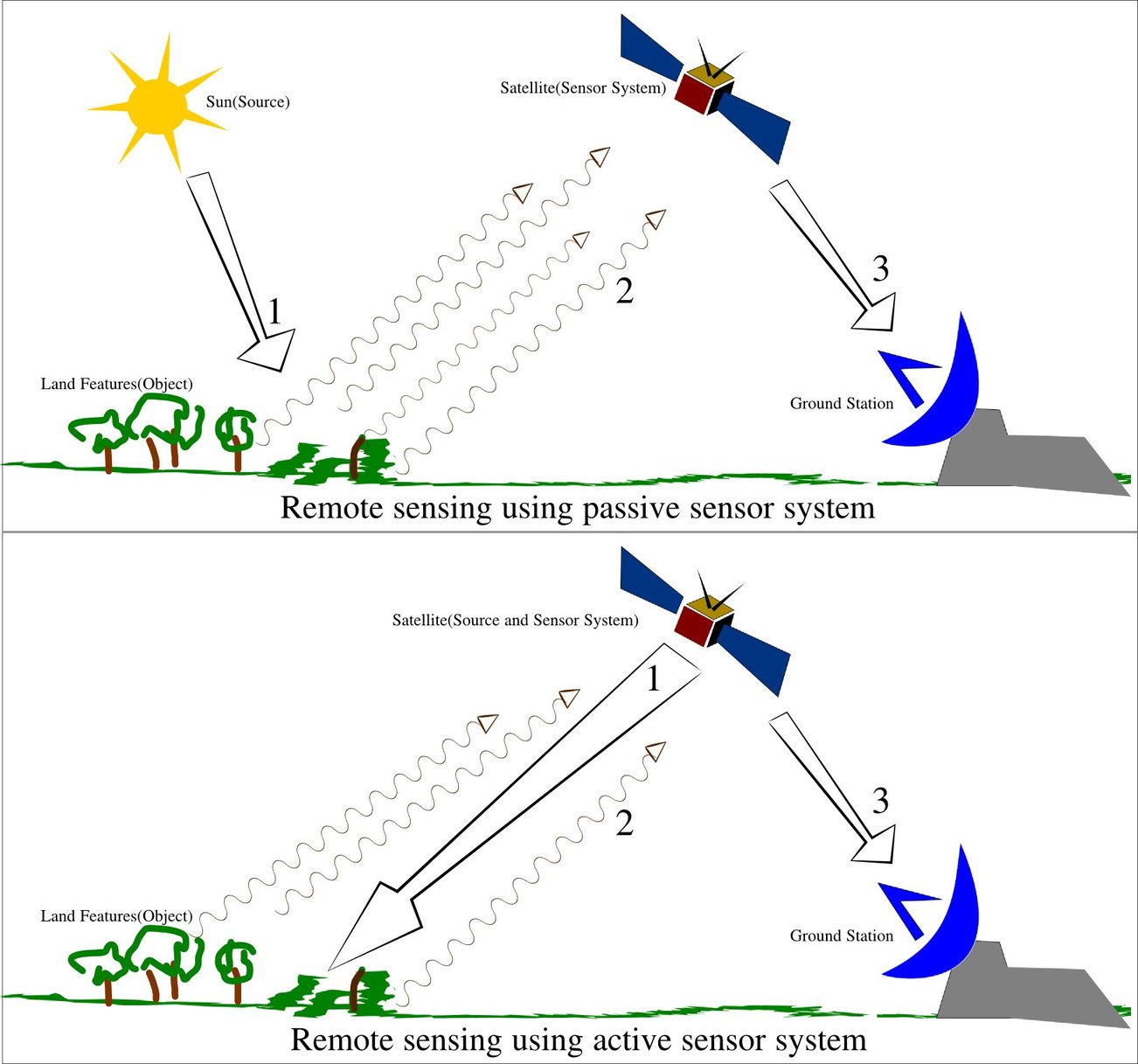
Remote Sensing Illustration

The Professional protection history personnel from this institute are in charge of perform this cultural resource management services, and the main purpose of the service is to help clients who want to develop projects, such as companies and developers, government agencies and citizens, to satisfy the law and provide assistance of the relationship between clients and local, state and federal agencies and tribes.

Some cultural resource management projects that The Office of Public Archaeology engaged:

- Seismic surveys
- Mines
- Linear pipeline surveys

Compliance services:

- Historic and archival research
- Geophysical/remote sensing survey
- Cultural resource survey
- Archaeological testing

== See also ==
- Machaerus
