= Joe Seger =

Archaeological and Biblical scholar with a focus on Jordan and Israel

Joe D. Seger (born 1935) is emeritus professor and former director of the Cobb Institute of Archaeology at Mississippi State University (1988–2014). He received his B.A. in History, Philosophy, and Religion from Elmhurst College in 1957, his B.D. in Old Testament and Philosophy of Religion from Eden Theological Seminary in 1960, and his Th.D. in Archaeology, Near Eastern Languages and Literature, and Old Testament History and Religion from Harvard University in 1965.

Seger served as Chairman of the Humanities Program at the University of Nebraska Omaha (1976–1981); served as president on the board of the W. F. Albright Institute of Archaeological Research in Israel (1988–1994), and as president on the board of the American Schools of Oriental Research (1996–2002); beginning 1975, served as the project director for the Lahav Research Project excavations at Tel Halif in Israel along with Paul F. Jacobs and Oded Borowski, and was Director of Phase II work at Gezer (1971–74). He was awarded the Alumni Merit Award by Elmhurst College in 2007 and has published 15 books and over 150 articles and reviews.
