= Pocahontas, Mississippi =

- Unincorporated community
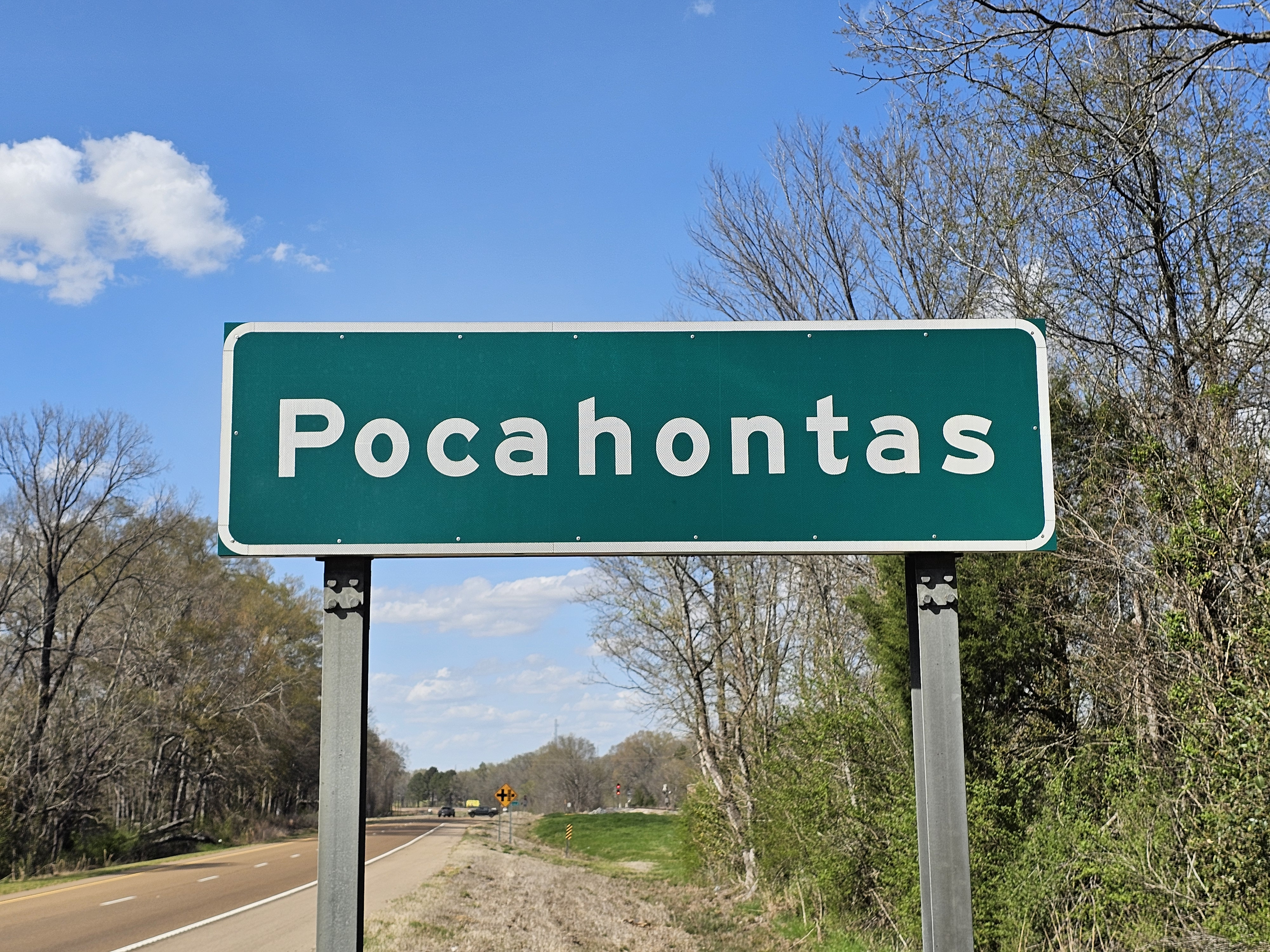
- Highway Sign in Pocahontas

- Location within Mississippi Location within the United States
- Coordinates: 32°28′28″N 90°17′10″W
- Country: United States
- State: Mississippi
- County: Hinds
- Elevation: 243 ft (74 m)
- Time zone: UTC-6 (Central (CST))
  - Summer (DST): UTC-5 (CDT)
- ZIP code: 39072
- Area code: 601
- GNIS feature ID: 676161

Pocahontas is an unincorporated community located in northern Hinds County, Mississippi on U.S. Route 49. It is located 5 miles (8.0 km) south of Flora and 9 miles (14 km) north of Jackson and part of the Jackson Metropolitan Statistical Area. Pocahontas has a ZIP code 39072.

== History ==
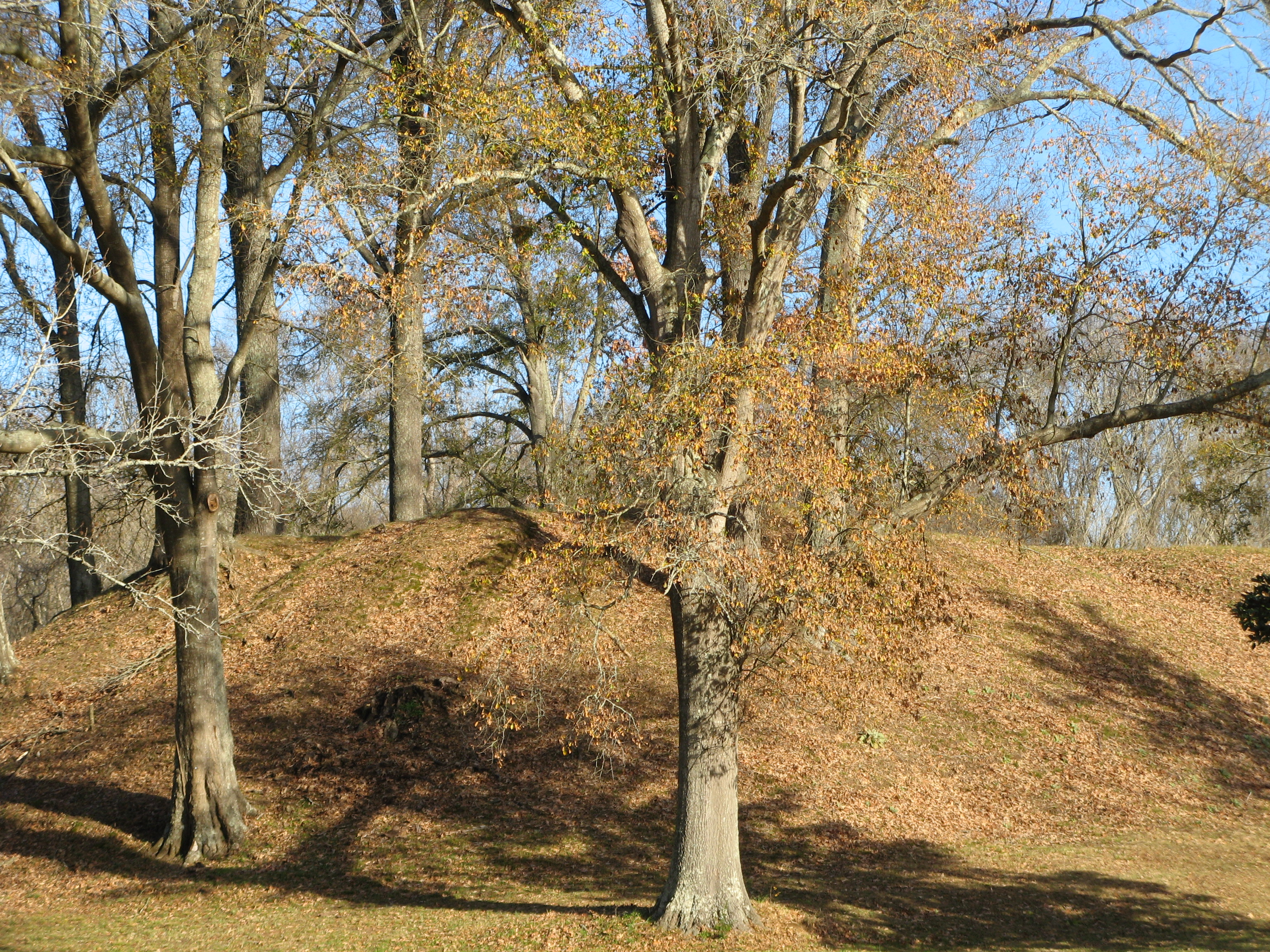
Pocahontas Mound A, located in a roadside park in Pocahontas, is listed on the National Register of Historic Places

Pocahontas was founded in the 1880s, and named after Pocahontas, the Native American Indian woman. Pocahontas is located on the Canadian National Railway.

Two sites in Pocahontas are listed on the National Register of Historic Places: Pocahontas Mounds and Sub Rosa.

== Notable people ==
- Gene Porter, jazz musician
- Arthur Guyton (1919–2003), physiologist, died in Pocahontas

== Transportation ==
Amtrak’s City of New Orleans, which operates between New Orleans and Chicago, passes through the town on CN tracks, but makes no stop. The nearest station is located in Jackson, 9 miles (14 km) to the south.
