= Pocahontas Mounds =

Archaeological site in Hinds County, Mississippi

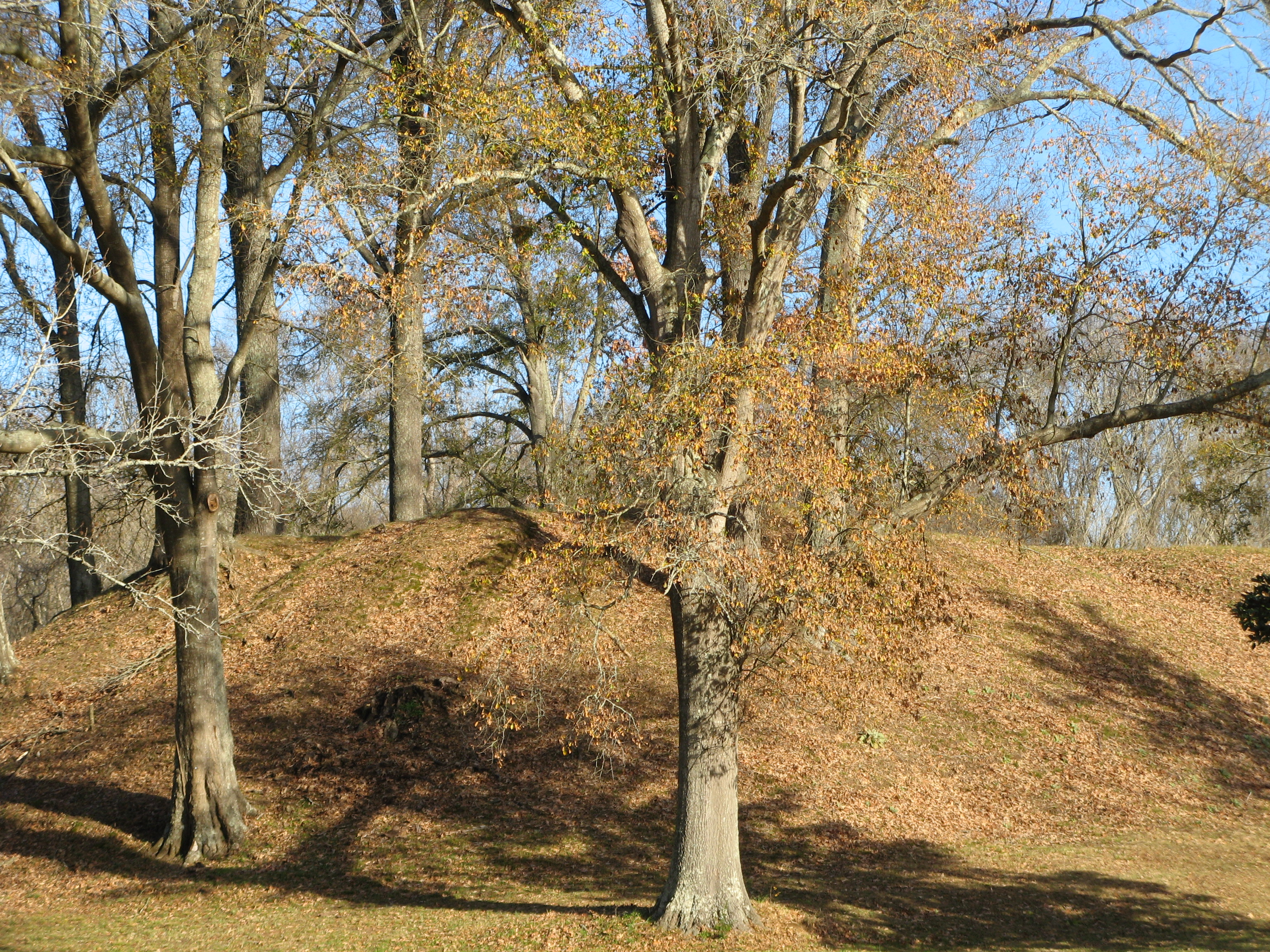
- Pocahontas Mound A

- Location within Mississippi today
- 32°28′9.37″N 90°17′17.81″W
- Cultures: Coles Creek culture, Plaquemine Mississippian culture
- Location: Pocahontas, Mississippi, Hinds County, Mississippi, US
- Region: Hinds County, Mississippi

History
- Built: 800 AD
- Abandoned: 1300 AD

Site notes
- Architectural styles: platform mound, plaza, tumulus
- Excavation dates: 2004
- Archaeologists: James A. Ford
- Pocahontas Mound A
- U.S. National Register of Historic Places
- Mississippi Landmark
- NRHP reference No.: 69000365

Significant dates
- Added to NRHP: November 25, 1969
- Designated USMS: March 5, 1986
- Pocahontas Mound B
- U.S. National Register of Historic Places
- NRHP reference No.: 72000694
- Added to NRHP: April 11, 1972

Pocahontas Mounds (22 HI 500) is an archaeological site from the Plaquemine Mississippian culture in Hinds County, Mississippi, dating from 800 to 1300 CE. Two mounds from the site were added to the NRHP on two separate occasions, Pocahontas Mound A on November 25, 1969, as NRIS number 69000365 and Pocahontas Mound B on April 11, 1972, as NRIS number 72000694. The mounds are listed on the Mississippi Mound Trail.

== Description ==
The site consists of two mounds, a rectangular platform mound and a mortuary mound, and an associated village area. The site was occupied from 800 to 1300 CE by peoples of the Coles Creek and Plaquemine Mississippian cultures, although evidence found during excavations in 2004 showed that the site was occupied briefly in the Middle-Late Archaic period about 4000-1000 BCE. The platform mound, Mound A, is about 175 feet (53 m) in width and 22 feet (6.7 m) in height. It was described in the late 1930s by archaeologist James A. Ford as being 250 feet (76 m) by 350 feet (110 m) at its base and 25 feet (7.6 m) in height. Archaeological investigations found the remains of a typical Mississippian-period thatched, clay-plastered log-post structure on the mounds summit, which was once a ceremonial temple or residence of a chief. Located 1,200 feet (370 m) northwest of Mound A is Mound B, a steep-sided conical mound 75 feet (23 m) in diameter and 10 feet (3.0 m) in height.

At the time of Ford's writing Mound B was included within the grounds of a local school and could not be excavated. Various kinds of artifacts have been recovered from the site through site survey collections and excavations, including Mississippian-culture copper ear-spools, Mississippian culture pottery, flint chips and numerous burials in the surrounding fields. A fragmentary bird effigy bowl and a human effigy ceramic pipe were found at the burial mound by children from the school. The pottery found at the site is very similar to that found at the Anna site.

New excavations took place in June 2004 under the direction of Jeffrey Alvey for the Cobb Institute of Archaeology and funded by the Mississippi Department of Transportation. In 2008, a roadside park was opened at Mound A as a combined rest stop area and educational center explaining the site's cultural and historical importance.

== Location ==
The site is used as a roadside park along U.S. Route 49, near its junction with Interstate 220.
