= Tel Halif =

Archaeological site in Israel

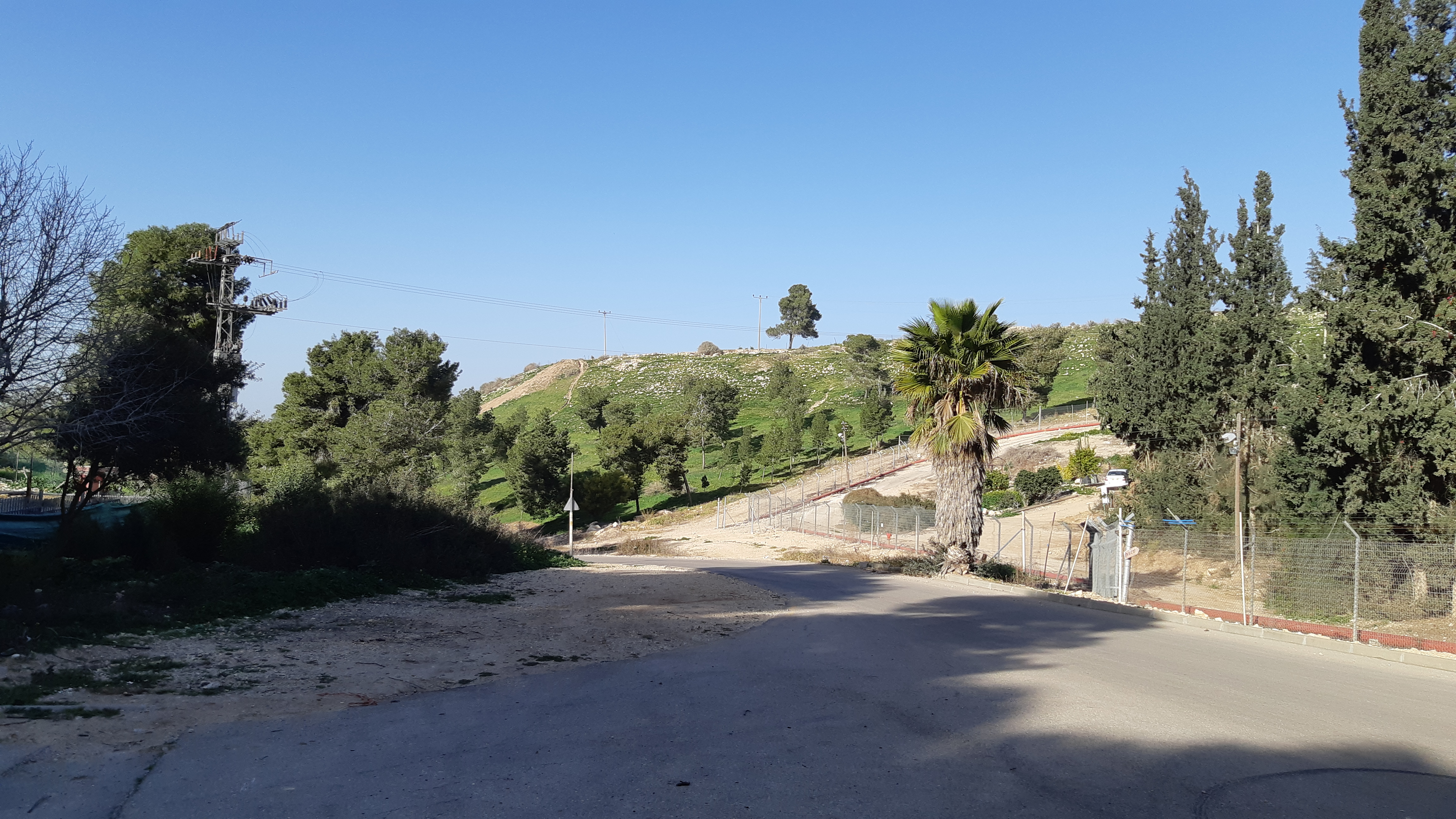
- Tel Halif, a view from south
- Interactive map of Tel Halif
- 31.383062°N 34.866140°E
- Location: Negev, Israel

Tel H̱alif, formerly Tel H̱alifa (Hebrew: תל חליף, Arabic name: Tel el-Khuweilifeh) is an archaeological site, a mound (tell) in northern Negev area, west from kibbutz Lahav, Israel.

== Identification ==
Albrecht Alt suggested that it is the location of the biblical town of Ziklag. Other evidence suggests Rimmon. Nadav Na'aman has suggested identifying this as the site of biblical Hormah.

== History ==
=== Iron Age ===
==== Iron I ====
Tel Halif was a small town inhabited by Israelites during the Iron Age I.

==== Iron II ====
It had a casemate wall and typical pillar-courtyard houses in the 9th–8th centuries BCE. William G. Dever estimates that the town's population was 200 in the 10th century and about 300 in the 9th and 8th centuries BCE. Rock-cut bench tombs were found nearby, and they represent burial practices typical to the 8th century BCE.

Archaeological evidence uncovered a house destroyed during the 701 BCE Assyrian invasion, and the town saw brief reoccupation in the early 7th century before being abandoned under Persian rule.

== Excavations ==
Excavcations around Tel Halif was among the research activities of the Cobb Institute of Archaeology as part of the Lahav Research Project arranged by Joe Seger in 1974.

== See also ==
- Battle of Tel el Khuweilfe
