= Martin Cheairs House =

Historic house in Tennessee, United States

- U.S. National Register of Historic Places
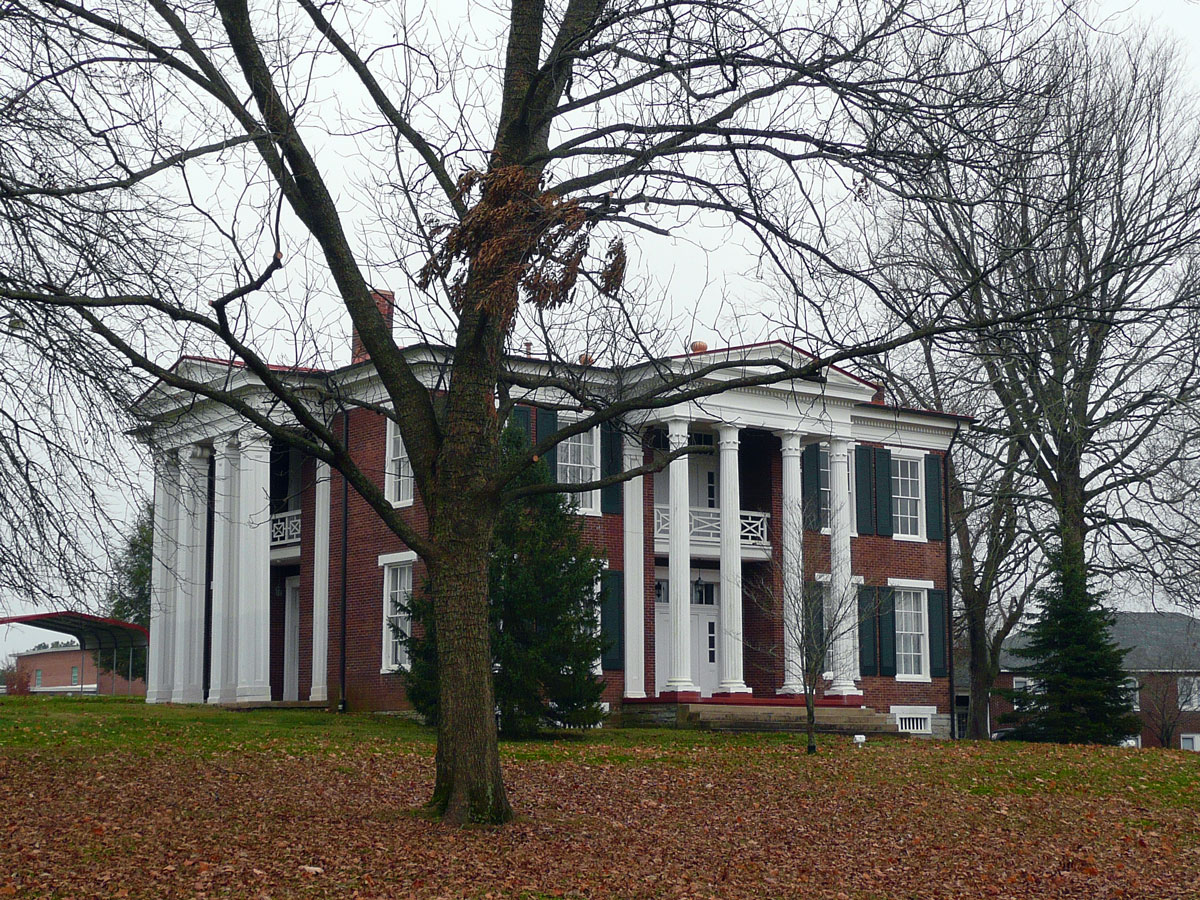
- The Martin Cheairs House in 2009

- Location within Tennessee Location within the United States
- Location: U.S. 31, Spring Hill, Tennessee
- Coordinates: 35°44′53″N 86°55′54″W
- Area: 1 acre (0.40 ha)
- Built: 1851
- Built by: Nathan Vaught
- Architectural style: Greek Revival
- NRHP reference No.: 76001787
- Added to NRHP: December 12, 1976

The Martin Cheairs House is a historic mansion in Spring Hill, Tennessee, United States.

== History ==
The mansion was built in the 1850s for Martin Cheairs, whose brother lived at the Rippavilla Plantation. Both mansions were designed in the Greek Revival architectural style.

During the American Civil War, General Earl Van Dorn of the Confederate States Army used the mansion as his headquarters (after he had left White Hall). He was murdered in the house in 1863.

Union Major General David S. Stanley used this house as his headquarters on the night of November 29, 1864, as his Fourth Army Corps pressed north, toward Franklin, Tennessee.

== Architectural significance ==
It has been listed on the National Register of Historic Places since December 12, 1976.
