= Adairius Barnes =

American football player (born 1994)

No. 38
- Position: Cornerback

Personal information
- Born: April 30, 1994 (age 32); Vicksburg, Mississippi, U.S.
- Listed height: 5 ft 10 in (1.78 m)
- Listed weight: 188 lb (85 kg)

Career information
- High school: Port Gibson (Port Gibson, Mississippi)
- College: Louisiana Tech
- NFL draft: 2016: undrafted

Career history
- Detroit Lions (2016–2017)

Career NFL statistics
- Total tackles: 7
- Stats at Pro Football Reference

Adairius Damone Barnes (born April 30, 1994) is an American former professional football player who was a cornerback in the National Football League (NFL). He played college football for the Louisiana Tech Bulldogs.

== Early life ==
Barnes attended Port Gibson High School where he lettered in football, track & field, baseball, and basketball. As a junior in 2010, he rushed the ball 17 times for 214 yards and five touchdowns, while recording 27 receptions for 647 yards and three touchdowns. As a senior in 2011, he rushed the ball 24 times for 390 yards and four touchdowns. he also was 15-of-28 for 428 yards and three touchdowns. He also recorded 22 receptions for 512 yards and six touchdowns. Also that season he recorded 45 tackles, 11 pass deflections, one interception, one forced fumble, four punt returns for 47 yards and two kickoff returns for 25 yards. For the season, he was ranked 24th on the Top 50 players in Mississippi. He was also named the team's best offensive player.

== College career ==
Barnes then attended Louisiana Tech. As freshman in 2012, he recorded five tackles (three solo), he also recorded one reception on a fake punt from Ryan Allen. As a sophomore in 2013, he appeared in all 12 games with 11 stars. he recorded 49 tackles (31 solo), one sack, a team leading four interceptions, one forced fumble and seven passes defensed. For the season, he was named All-Conference USA honorable mention. In 2014 as a junior, he recorded 46 tackles (30 solo), four tackles-for-loss, nine passes defensed, and five interceptions. As a senior in 2015, he recorded 50 tackles (39 solo), 1.5 tackles-for-loss, one interception, one forced fumble and one fumble recovery. For the season, he was named All-Conference USA honorable mention and second-team All-Louisiana.

== Professional career ==
Pre-draft measurables
Height	Weight	40-yard dash	10-yard split	20-yard split	20-yard shuttle	Three-cone drill	Vertical jump	Broad jump	Bench press
5 ft 10 in (1.78 m)	179 lb (81 kg)	4.55 s	1.56 s	2.59 s	4.08 s	6.82 s	41 1/2 in (1.05 m)	10 ft 6 in (3.20 m)	14 reps
All values from Louisiana Tech pro day.

After going unselected in the 2016 NFL draft, Barnes signed with the Detroit Lions. He made the Lions' final roster after the preseason and played in seven games recording seven tackles before being waived on December 15, 2016 and re-signed to the practice squad. He was promoted back to the active roster on January 3, 2017.

On September 2, 2017, Barnes was waived by the Lions and was signed to the practice squad the next day. He was released on November 10, 2017, but was re-signed on November 22. He was released again on December 14, 2017, but was re-signed five days later. He signed a reserve/future contract with the Lions on January 1, 2018. He was waived by the Lions on April 19, 2018.
