= Hugh M. Foley =

Hugh M. Foley (January 25, 1847 – 1896) was an American teacher, storekeeper, minister, farmer, newspaper publisher, and politician in Mississippi. He served as a Wilkinson County Board of Supervisor, and in the Mississippi House of Representatives from 1870 to 1873. He was Black, and a Republican.

== Life and career ==
Hugh M. Foley was born on January 25, 1847, in Wilkinson County, Mississippi. He was educated in Adams County, Mississippi, where his father was from.

In 1869, Foley was ordained as an African Methodist Episcopal Church minister. He published the Vindicator newspaper in Port Gibson. He testified in 1876 about election issues, including intimidation and violence. In 1889, he relocated to New Jersey.
