= McGregor (Port Gibson, Mississippi) =

Historic house in Mississippi, United States

- U.S. National Register of Historic Places
- Location within Mississippi Location within the United States
- Location: SR 547, Port Gibson, Mississippi
- Coordinates: 31°56′32″N 90°58′37″W
- Area: 4.5 acres (1.8 ha)
- Built: 1835
- Built by: Peter Aaron Van Dorn
- Architectural style: Greek Revival
- MPS: Port Gibson MRA
- NRHP reference No.: 79003424
- Added to NRHP: July 22, 1979

McGregor, located on SR 547 in Port Gibson, Mississippi, USA, is a country house built in 1835. It was designed in the Greek Revival style. It is privately owned and not open to the public.

The one-and-a-half story house was designed and/or built by the planter and judge Peter Aaron Van Dorn (1773–1837) for one of his daughters, likely as a wedding present. The gable-frame wooden residence in built on the center hall plan. It has inset galleries along the north (front) and south (rear) facades. About 1850, an ell was added to the west facade.

Van Dorn was born in New Jersey in 1773 had a law degree from Princeton. He moved to the Mississippi Territory at the age of 21. He settled in Port Gibson about 1811, setting up a law practice, marrying and becoming involved in local civic affairs. After Mississippi was admitted as a state, Van Dorn was appointed a judge on the Orphan's Court. He also owned a 1,000-acre plantation on the Yazoo River. About 1830, he had built his own fine residence, known as Van Dorn House, on a hill in Port Gibson. It also is listed on the National Register of Historic Places.

McGregor was listed on the National Register of Historic Places in 1979 The listing included a contributing building on a 4.5-acre (1.8 ha) area.

== See also ==
- Van Dorn House
- Earl Van Dorn
