= Joseph Dunbar =

Joseph Dunbar may refer to:

- Joseph Dunbar (scientist)
- Joseph Dunbar (politician)
