= Edward W. Hawthorne =

American cardiologist (1921–1986)

- Born: November 30, 1921; Alcorn State, Mississippi, U.S.
- Died: October 7, 1986 (aged 64); Washington, D.C., U.S.
- Education: Howard University (BS, MD); University of Illinois Chicago (MA, PhD)
- Occupation: Cardiologist
- Spouse: Eula Roberts (m. 1948)
- Children: 5
- Awards: Member of the National Academy of Medicine (1972)
- Scientific career
- Workplaces: Howard University

Edward William Hawthorne (November 30, 1921 – October 7, 1986) was an American cardiologist and academic administrator. After getting his degrees at Howard University and University of Illinois Chicago, he returned to Howard as part of the faculty and was head of their physiology and biophysics departments and their Graduate School of Arts and Sciences. Hawthorne was a 1972 member of the National Academy of Medicine. His work in cardiology included research on heart surgery and applied mathematics.

== Biography ==
Edward William Hawthorne was born on November 30, 1921, on the campus of Alcorn Agricultural and Mechanical College. His father was Baptist minister Edward William Hawthorne, who died when he was a child, and his mother was Port Gibson High School teacher Charlotte Bernice Killian. His mother divorced and remarried to Howard professor Riley F. Thomas. He graduated from Dunbar High School.

After briefly attending Fisk University, Hawthorne transferred to Howard University for cheaper tuition. earning his BS in biology in 1941 there. After getting an MD at Howard in 1946, he became interested in cardiology while working at Freedmen's Hospital as an intern (1946–1947). He later moved to University of Illinois Chicago, where he obtained his MS in 1949 and PhD in 1951.

In 1951, Hawthorne returned to Howard as part of the faculty. He was one of the developers of both Howard physiology programs for master degrees and doctorates. He served as head of the Department of Physiology (1958–1969) and of Physiology and Biophysics (1969–1974). From 1969 to 1972, he was an editorial board member for the Journal of Medical Education.

Hawthorne's cardiological work focused on research to improve heart surgery amidst the discovery of valve replacement. He helped start Howard's Cardiovascular Renal Research Group, which "attracted and trained many African-American cardiovascular physiologists". He and Walter C. Bowie directed a research project – which received a $15,085 United States Public Health Service grant in 1951 – involving the use of horse hearts to study cardiology, and his research even intersected with applied mathematics, having proposed that the left ventricle was a non-prolate ellipsoid. He once called his academic research "a personal vendetta against ignorance".

On January 18, 1955, he was elected to the Washington Academy of Sciences "in recognition of his work on renal physiology". He was appointed Fellow of the American College of Cardiology in 1969, and elected to the National Academy of Medicine in 1972. In 1984, the Heart House Auditorium hosted a symposium on myocardial hypertrophy in his honor.

In 1962, Hawthorne became assistant dean of Howard University College of Medicine, serving until 1967, when he was promoted to associate dean (in turn serving until 1970), and in 1974 became dean of the Graduate School of Arts and Sciences. He served as vice-president of the American Heart Association from 1969 to 1972, as well as a board member of the AHA's Washington, D.C. chapter from 1966 to 1971. He was president of the John A. Andrew Clinical Society from 1965 to 1966 and the Association of Former Interns and Residents of Freedmen's Hospital from 1971 to 1972, as well as executive secretary of the latter from 1957 to 1969.

Hawthorne married nurse Eula Roberts in 1948. The couple had four daughters and a son.

Hawthorne suffered from polio when he was seven, and by the 1970s it had progressed to a point where he had to use a wheelchair. He died on October 7, 1986, in Washington, D.C., aged 64.

== Bibliography ==
- Scarupa, Harriet (January 1983). "The Intellectual Voyages Of Edward W. Hawthorne". New Directions. Vol. 10, no. 2.
