= Van Dorn House =

Historic house in Mississippi, United States

- U.S. National Register of Historic Places
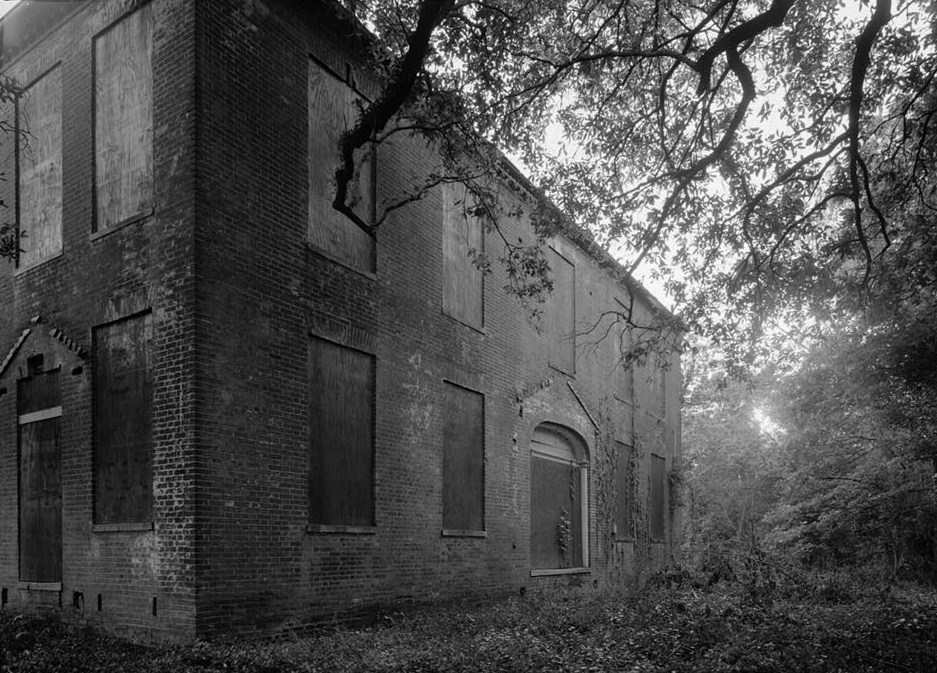

- Location within Mississippi Location within the United States
- Location: Van Dorn Dr., Port Gibson, Mississippi
- Coordinates: 31°56′24″N 91°2′15″W
- Area: 5.6 acres (2.3 ha)
- MPS: Port Gibson MRA
- NRHP reference No.: 71000446
- Added to NRHP: June 21, 1971

The Van Dorn House is a historic hilltop residence in Port Gibson, Mississippi built circa 1830 for Peter Aaron Van Dorn and his wife. He was a lawyer from New Jersey who made his fortune in this area, having a practice, gaining political appointments, and becoming a cotton planter. This was the home for years for his large family in Port Gibson, including son Earl Van Dorn. The latter was a career U.S. Army officer who joined the Confederate Army after the start of the Civil War, ultimately reaching the rank of Major General.

A historic marker onsite gives the home's date as ca. 1830 and the style as Federal architecture. The residence was added to the National Register of Historic Places on June 21, 1971. The owners donated the house and surrounding 5.1 acres to the State of Mississippi Department of Archives and History by December 1972. In 1979 a revised site survey, due to the need to protect the site from development of the surrounding area, expanded the historically relevant site to about 20 acres. The house is located on Van Dorn Drive, named after the father.

== Peter Van Dorn ==
Peter Van Dorn was of Dutch descent, born in 1773 and raised in Peapack, New Jersey with nearly a dozen siblings. He was educated at what became Princeton University, studying law. He married and moved to Virginia, where there were many families with ties to Princeton. After his first wife died here, he migrated to the Mississippi Territory when he was 21 years old.

He began to practice law in Natchez, Mississippi. Territorial Governor Claiborne appointed him as marshal of Natchez in 1804. Many prospective settlers and their slaves traveled southward along the Natchez Trace, a historic trail from what became Nashville, Tennessee to Natchez.

Van Dorn moved north from Natchez to Port Gibson, which he helped to develop, as well as the surrounding Claiborne County alongside the Trace and bordered by the Mississippi River. Governor Claiborne appointed Peter Van Dorn as clerk of the court for Claiborne County in 1810. In 1816 he was appointed as the clerk of the territory's new House of Representatives (which later became the state legislature).

In 1821 the relatively new Mississippi legislature created an Orphan Court system (handling probate matters) and appointed Peter Van Dorn to the circuit including Claiborne County. That same year, the legislature decided to create a new state capital at Jackson, Mississippi. Van Dorn was among the commissioners appointed to plan it. In April 1822 they submitted a plan using a "checkerboard" pattern advocated by Thomas Jefferson, in which city blocks alternated with parks and other open spaces, giving the appearance of a checkerboard (although not always followed by later developers).

Van Dorn also became a planter in Mississippi, owning a cotton plantation on the Yazoo River and the numerous enslaved African Americans to work it. In 1826 he bought the land in Port Gibson for his town house.

After settling in Port Gibson, about 1812 Van Dorn had married Sophia Donelson Caffery, daughter of a prominent Tennessee family. They had nine children together. She died in early 1831.

Sophia's grandfather Col. John Donaldson had been an aide to General George Washington during the American Revolutionary War. He moved to what became Tennessee, where he helped found Fort Nashborough (which later became Nashville). Sophia's aunt Rachel Donelson Caffery had married Andrew Jackson, but died before he was elected as president. Jackson later visited the Van Dorn home in Port Gibson on various trips along the way to New Orleans. This family connection gained son Earl Van Dorn a federal appointment to West Point, the catalyst for his military career.

Peter Van Dorn in 1830 traveled to New York and Washington, D.C., with 14-year-old daughter Octavia; they met President Jackson at the White House. Donelson Caffery, a nephew in Louisiana through his wife's family, became a prominent sugar planter, Confederate officer, and was elected by the state legislature as a U.S. Senator after the American Civil War. Sophia's sister Sarah Caffery Walker was the mother of John George Walker (1821-1893), who also became a Confederate general.

Peter Aaron Van Dorn also designed McGregor. The house was in the Greek Revival architecture style, built in 1835 for one of his daughters. It was listed on the NRHP in 1979.

== Major General Earl Van Dorn ==
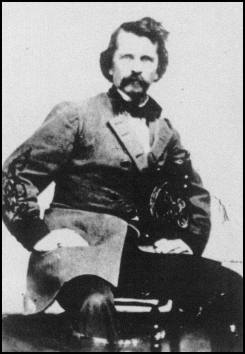
Portrait of Major-General Earl Van Dorn

Earl Van Dorn was born September 17, 1820, on his family's plantation near Port Gibson. He lived in the Port Gibson town house for part of his childhood. As was typical of planter's sons, he was educated privately. As noted, his mother died in early 1831. His father died in 1837, drowning en route to inspect a plantation on the Yahoo River. The younger Van Dorn gained a federal appointment to attend the U.S. Military Academy at West Point, New York, graduating in 1842 and beginning a military career.

He married in 1842, to a woman from a prominent Alabama planter family. They had a son and daughter together. Earl Van Dorn won promotions during the Mexican-American War and Seminole War, and became the commanding officer at the border garrison at Mason, Texas by 1860. Supporting secession, he resigned his U.S. Army commission following President Lincoln's election and joined the Confederate Army. He rose to become a Confederate general in the American Civil War.

Earl Van Dorn was known as a womanizer and was said to have fathered three illegitimate, or natural, children. He was called "the terror of ugly husbands". He was fatally shot on May 7, 1863, in Spring Hill, Tennessee, by Dr. George B. Peters, who was often away because of his service as a legislator and had been told that his wife was allegedly having an affair with the general. Peters had caught his much younger wife and Van Dorn embracing in April. Peters escaped through Confederate lines following the killing and reached Union-held Nashville. He was subsequently arrested by Confederate authorities but was ultimately released and never tried for shooting Van Dorn.

Both Peter Aaron Van Dorn and Earl Van Dorn were buried in Wintergreen Cemetery in Port Gibson. It is recognized as an historic cemetery and listed on the National Register of Historic Places.

One of Earl Van Dorn's sisters, Emily Van Dorn, later wrote A Soldier's Honor: With Reminiscences of Major-General Earl Van Dorn, in an effort to clear her brother's name.

== See also ==
- National Register of Historic Places listings in Claiborne County, Mississippi
- Confederate Army of West Tennessee
