= Port Gibson High School =

United States historic high school in Mississippi, US

Location
- 159 Old Highway 18 #1; Port Gibson, (Claiborne County), Mississippi 39150; United States
- 31.9631°N 90.9476°W

Information
- Type: Public high school
- Established: 1924
- School district: Claiborne County School District
- Principal: Eddwin Smith
- Staff: 24.91 (FTE)
- Enrollment: 374 (2023-2024)
- Student to teacher ratio: 15.01
- Colors: Navy Blue, Columbia Blue, and White
- Mascot: Blue Wave
- Website: www.claiborne.k12.ms.us

Port Gibson High School is a public high school in unincorporated Claiborne County, Mississippi, with a Port Gibson. It opened in 1924. It is part of the Claiborne County School District. The student body is 99 percent African American. The old Port Gibson High School campus is now used by Port Gibson Middle School and is listed on the National Register of Historic Places.

The school's district includes all of Claiborne County, including the employee residences of Alcorn State University.

== History ==
Port Gibson High School was for whites only prior to integration. Black students had to go to Alcorn College High School or to Claiborne County Training School. In 1942 the latter got classes after the 10th grade.

Port Gibson High School had a librarian and a music program.

After it was integrated almost all the white students left the school.

In 1995, Glendora Alexander-Muhammad who taught business education and computer science at Port Gibson High School planned to accompany 30 school girls to the Women in Science and Technology ( WIST ) program event.

== Sports ==
Blue Waves are the school mascot.

== Alumni ==
- Joseph Dunbar, a doctor and diabetes researcher
- Colonel Magruder
- Adairius Barnes, football player
- Robert Turner (defensive back)
- Jay Disharoon, state legislator
- Yolanda Moore, basketball player

== See also ==
- Chamberlain-Hunt Academy
- List of high schools in Mississippi
