= White Hall (Spring Hill, Tennessee) =

Historic house in Tennessee, United States

- U.S. National Register of Historic Places
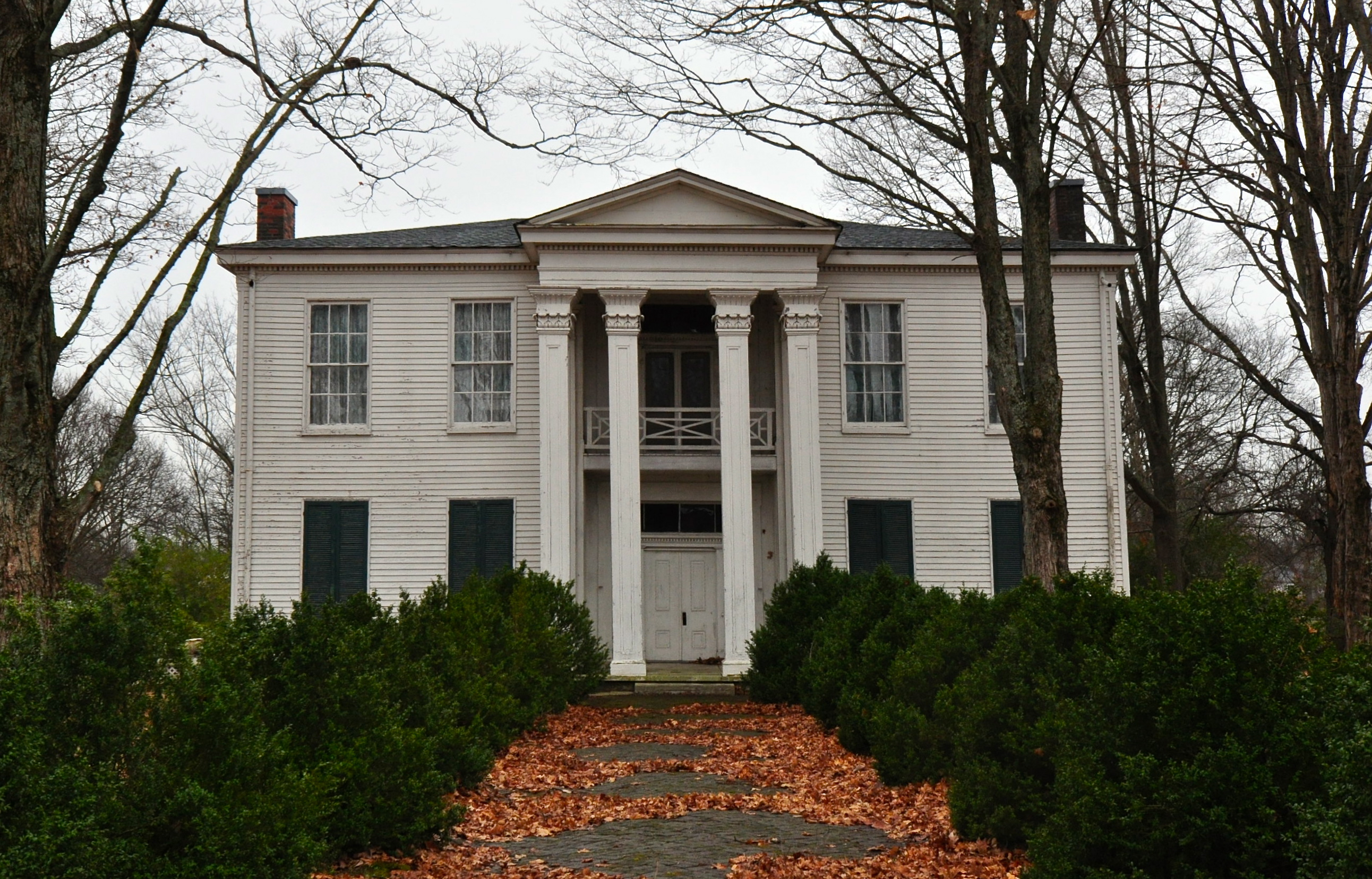
- White Hall in 2013

- Location within Tennessee Location within the United States
- Location: Duplex Rd., Spring Hill, Tennessee
- Coordinates: 35°45′8″N 86°55′32″W
- Area: 1.08 acres (0.44 ha)
- Built: 1844
- Architect: White, Henry
- Architectural style: Greek Revival
- NRHP reference No.: 84003661
- Added to NRHP: April 5, 1984

White Hall is a historic mansion in Spring Hill, Tennessee, USA.

== History ==
The two-story mansion was completed in 1844. It was designed in the Greek Revival architectural style. It was built for Dr. Aaron C. White, a physician and planter, by his brother Henry White. Dr. White's father was General William C. White who was once in a duel with Sam Houston.

During the American Civil War, the mansion was used as military headquarters for General Earl Van Dorn of the Confederate States Army. By 1863, General Van Dorn moved to the Martin Cheairs House, where he was murdered by the jealous Dr. James Bodie Peters a week later for an alleged affair with Dr. Peter's wife. Some historians speculate that Earl's murder by Peters was a ruse in order to gain favor of the North which occupied Peter's family land in Arkansas. Supporting arguments include the fact that Peter's was able to flee unimpeded and gates through fields were left open beforehand. Meanwhile, in the aftermath of the Battle of Franklin in 1864, soldiers serving under Confederate General Nathan Bedford Forrest were treated by Dr. White at White Hall.

== Architectural significance ==
It has been listed on the National Register of Historic Places since April 5, 1984.
