= Temple Gemiluth Chessed =

Synagogue in Port Gibson, Mississippi

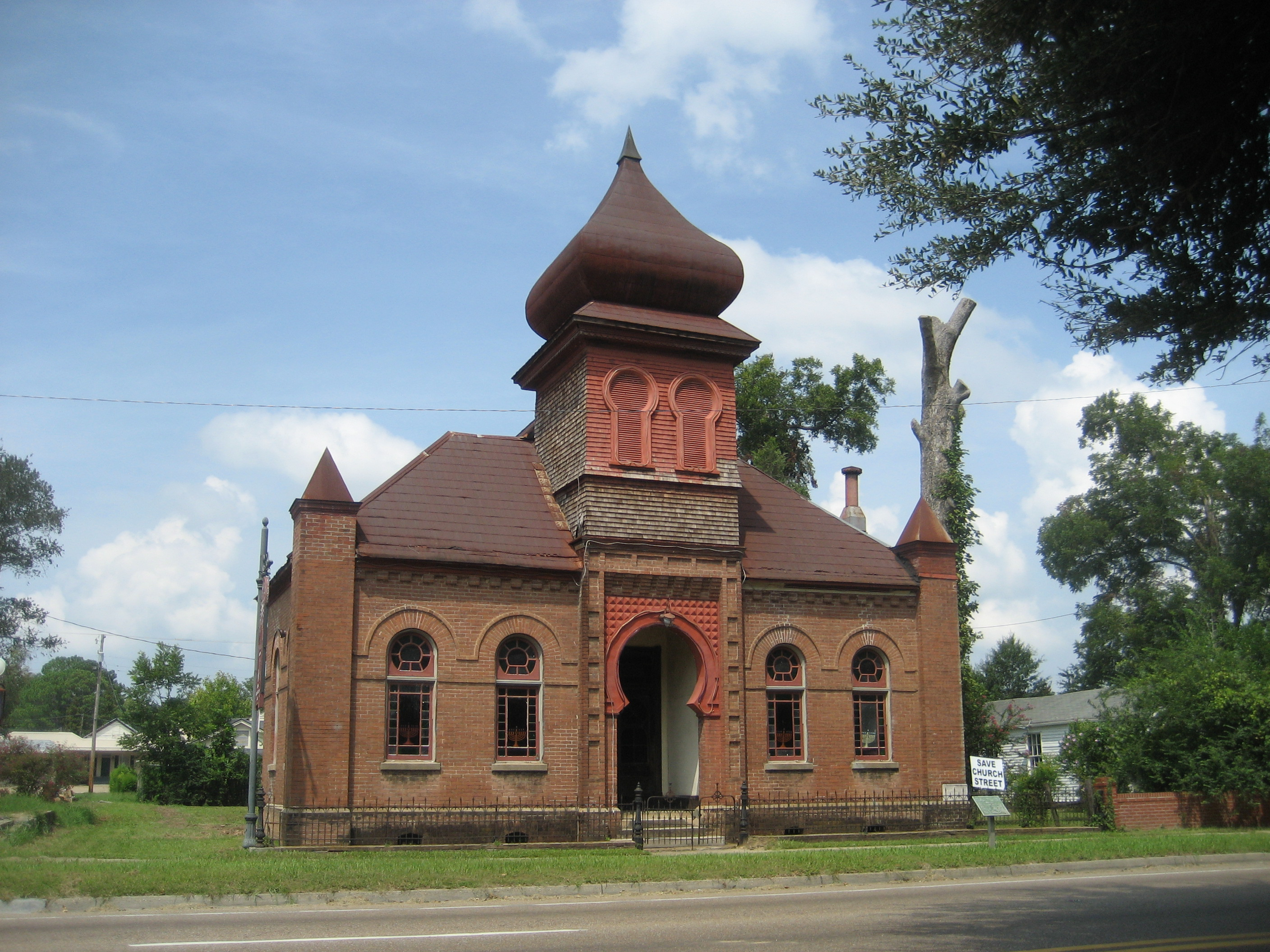
- The former synagogue, in 2008

- Location of the former synagogue in Mississippi

Religion
- Affiliation: Reform Judaism (former)
- Ecclesiastical or organisational status: Synagogue (1892–1986)
- Status: Closed; abandoned

Location
- Location: 706 Church Street, Port Gibson, Mississippi
- Country: United States
- Coordinates: 31°57′33″N 90°58′58″W

Architecture
- Architects: Bartlett and Budemeyer
- Type: Synagogue architecture
- Style: Moorish Revival
- General contractor: J. F. Barnes
- Established: 1870 (as a congregation)
- Groundbreaking: 1891
- Completed: 1892
- Construction cost: $7,000
- Materials: Red brick

Temple Gemiluth Chessed (transliterated from Hebrew as "Acts of Loving Kindness") is a former Reform Jewish congregation and synagogue, located at 706 Church Street, in Port Gibson, Mississippi, in the United States. Built in 1892, it is the oldest congregation in the state and the only building completed in the Moorish Revival style. The congregation was founded in 1870 by a community of Jewish immigrants from German states and Alsace-Lorraine. Due to declining population as people moved to larger urban areas, the congregation closed in 1986.

== History ==
The Port Gibson Jewish community was established in the 1840s by Ashkenazi immigrants from the German states and Alsace-Lorraine. Working first as peddlers, they founded the Port Gibson Jewish cemetery in 1870 and built the synagogue in 1892 on Church Street. According to an 1887 deed, the Hebrew Benevolent Society of Port Gibson, incorporated in 1870, purchased the land for $300.

It is the oldest surviving synagogue in the state and the only building of this architectural style. There were about 50-60 Jewish families during the peak of population at the beginning of the twentieth century. By then most of the men worked as merchants and cotton brokers.

With the decline of the Mississippi River towns in the later twentieth century, the Jewish community dwindled as the next generations moved to larger cities. The congregation closed in 1986. They donated their Torah and artifacts to the Museum of the Southern Jewish Experience in Utica, Mississippi.

Threatened with demolition for other development, the synagogue was sold and purchased by non-Jews, who preserved the building.

== Description ==
The exterior features the unusual combination of a Moorish-style keyhole doorway surmounted by a Russian-style cupola. The windows in the turret supporting the dome are also in Moorish keyhole style. The windows on the brick main floor of the building appear from the exterior as simple arched windows.

The interior incorporates elements of the Moorish Revival style. Colored-glass panels form Moorish keyhole-shaped windows within arched masonry openings, creating the appearance of Moorish windows without elaborate brickwork. The niche for the aron kodesh is framed by a horseshoe arch.

== See also ==
- History of the Jews in the United States
- List of the oldest synagogues in the United States
