= Clement Sulivane =

American politician

- Born: August 20, 1838; Port Gibson, Claiborne County, Mississippi, U.S.
- Died: November 9, 1920 (aged 82); Cambridge, Dorchester County, Maryland, U.S.
- Occupations: Lawyer, politician
- Spouse: Delia Bayly Hayward
- Children: Earl Van Dorn Sulivane; Vans Murray Sulivane; Ruth Sulivane
- Parent(s): Vans Murray Sulivane; Octavia Van Dorn
- Relatives: Earl Van Dorn (uncle); William Vans Murray (uncle); Peter Aaron Van Dorn (maternal grandfather)
- Military career
- Allegiance: Confederate States of America (1861–1865)
- Branch: Confederate States Army
- Service years: 1861–1865
- Rank: Aide-de-camp (CSA)

Clement Sulivane (1838–1920) was an American Confederate soldier, lawyer, journalist and politician. He served in the Maryland Senate from 1878 to 1880.

== Early life ==
Clement Sulivane was born on August 20, 1838, in Port Gibson, Mississippi. His father was Vans Murray Sulivane and his mother, Octavia Van Dorn. His maternal grandfather was Peter Aaron Van Dorn (1773–1837). One of his uncles was Earl Van Dorn. Another uncle was William Vans Murray.

He was educated at a preparatory school in Northampton, Massachusetts. He attended Princeton University in Princeton, New Jersey, and graduated from the University of Virginia in Charlottesville, Virginia, in 1857. He studied the Law, and was admitted to the bar in 1860.

During the American Civil War of 1861–1865, he served in the Confederate States Army as an aide-de-camp to his uncle, Earl Van Dorn. He later wrote The Fall of Richmond.

== Career ==
Sulivane worked as a lawyer and journalist in Cambridge, Maryland. He then served in the Maryland Senate from 1878 to 1880.

== Personal life ==
Sulivane married Delia Bayly Hayward, the daughter of William Richard Hayward and Eliza Ennalls Eccleston. They had three children:

- Earl Van Dorn Sulivane (1869–1950).
- Vans Murray Sulivane (1873–1938).
- Ruth Sulivane (1874–1953).

== Death ==
Sulivane died on November 9, 1920, in Cambridge, Maryland.
