= Samuel Reading Bertron =

American banker (1865–1938)

Samuel Reading Bertron Jr.
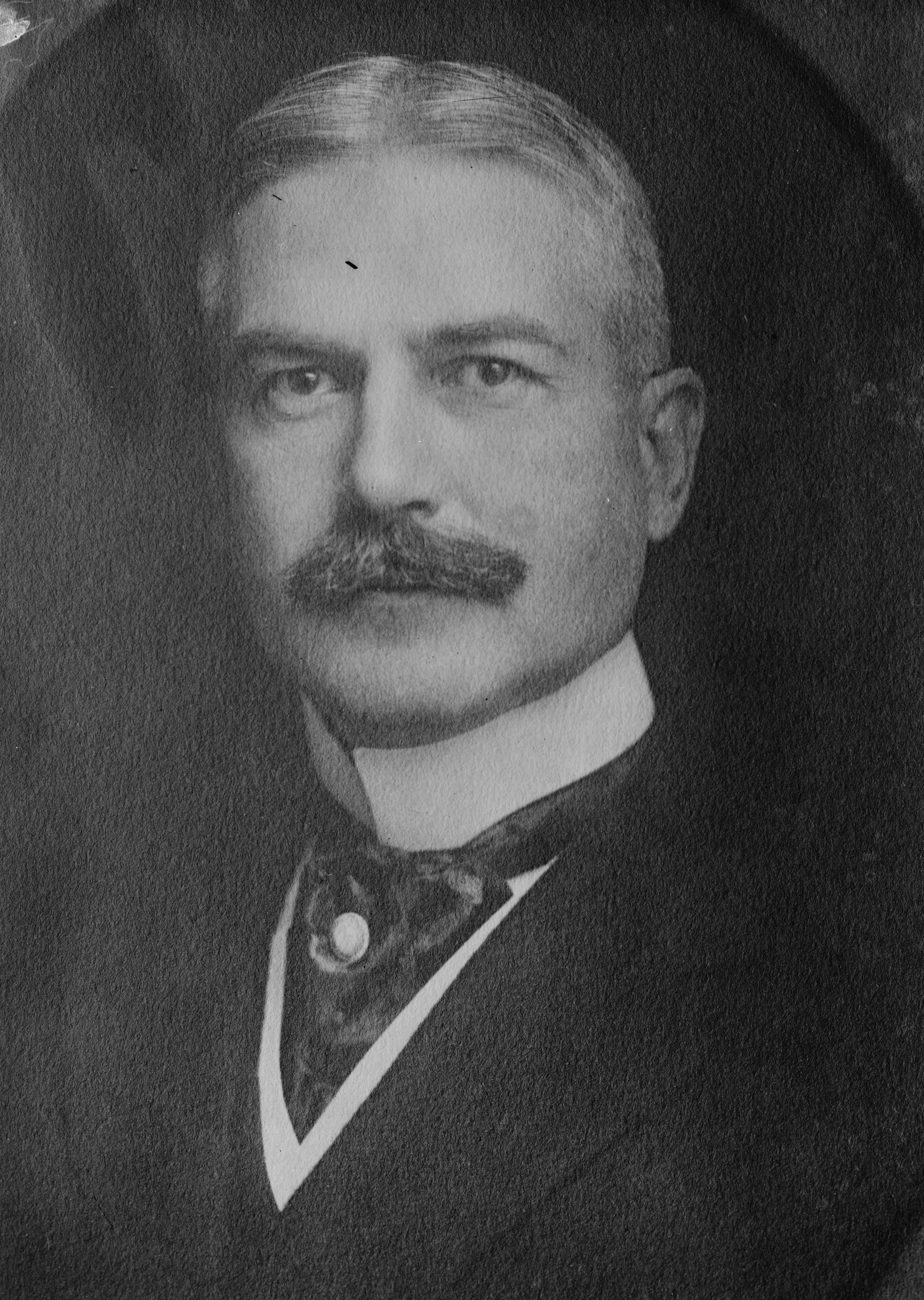
- Bertron in 1917
- Born: February 26, 1865; Port Gibson, Mississippi
- Died: June 30, 1938 (aged 73); Cove Neck, New York
- Education: Yale University
- Parent(s): Samuel Reading Bertron Sr. Ottilie Mueler

Samuel Reading Bertron Jr. (February 26, 1865 – June 30, 1938) was an American banker.

== Biography ==
Bertron was born on February 26, 1865, in Port Gibson, Mississippi. His father was a Philadelphia-born and Princeton University-educated Presbyterian minister, Samuel Reading Bertron Sr. (1806–1878), and his mother was a German immigrant, Ottilie Mueler (1830–1903).

Rev. S.R. Berton moved to Port Gibson, Mississippi, in 1835, where he preached in a variety of churches and institutions. The senior Bertron had three wives and five children. Rev. Bertron's wives were Caroline Christie (March 25, 1818 – April 13, 1839), Catherine McRae Crane, widow of Alfred Thomas Barnes (died 1849), and Ottilie Mueler. The first two wives died in childbirth. Bertron Jr. had three sisters and a brother. Rev. Bertron's five children from the three wives were: Mary, Clara, Annie, Francis, and Samuel Jr. The last was the only child of Rev. Bertron and his third wife, whom he married in 1857. Rev. Bertron died in the yellow fever epidemic of 1878.

Bertron Jr. was educated at Yale University. While at Yale, he was a member of Skull and Bones and played for the Yale Bulldogs football team in 1883 and 1884. According to family stories, Bertron's education was paid for by the McIlhenny family on the proviso that he return to Port Gibson, Mississippi, after his graduation in 1885 and work for them. According to the Quarter-centenary Record of the Class of 1885 at Yale University, Bertron returned to Port Gibson after graduating. He was admitted to the bar in Mississippi in 1886. Bertron's rise in business was meteoric. He was transferred to the East Coast Branch of the Equitable Mortgage Company in Boston in 1889. He was then transferred to the New York City office in 1892. There he was admitted to the bar for New York. Bertron gave up his law practice and left Equitable in 1894 to work for an investment company. In time, the company became his.

Bertron met his wife, Caroline Maury Harding, in Port Gibson. They were married in 1888. Their one child, a daughter, Elizabeth Maury Bertron, married Snowden Andrews Fahnestock in 1910.

While in New York, Bertron was active as a part-time diplomat. In 1912, he helped with peace negotiations between Italy and Turkey. In 1917, he was appointed to join the Root commission to Russia, led by Elihu Root. He appeared before the Federal Electric Railways Commission.

Bertron died on June 30, 1938, in Cove Neck, New York. He was buried at Wintergreen Cemetery in Port Gibson, Mississippi.
