= Peter Aaron Van Dorn =

American lawyer (1773–1837)

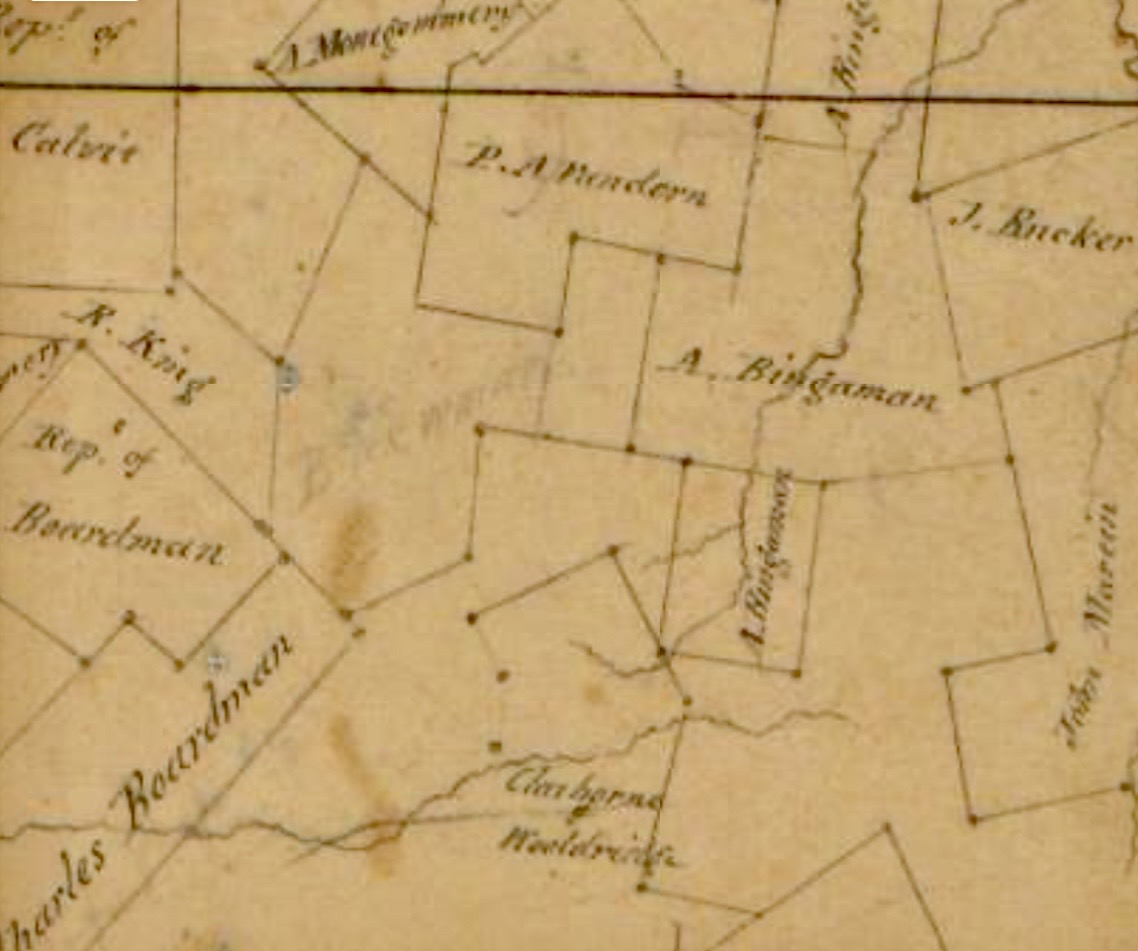
- 1810 map showing property of P. A. Van Dorn and neighbors
- Born: September 12, 1773; Peapack, New Jersey
- Died: February 12, 1837 (aged 63); Mississippi
- Resting place: Wintergreen Cemetery, Port Gibson, Mississippi
- Education: Princeton University
- Occupations: Lawyer, planter
- Spouse: 2, including Sophia (Donelson Caffery) Van Dorn
- Children: Mary Van Dorn; Jane Van Dorn; Octavia Van Dorn; Earl Van Dorn; Aaron Van Dorn; Mabella Van Dorn; Sarah Van Dorn; Emily Van Dorn; Jacob Van Dorn
- Parent(s): Aaron Van Dorn; Ghacy Schenck
- Relatives: Clement Sulivane (grandson)

Peter Aaron Van Dorn (September 12, 1773 – February 12, 1837) was an American lawyer, judge and cotton planter in Mississippi. Born and raised in New Jersey, with a law degree from Princeton, as a young man he migrated to the Mississippi Territory, where he made his career and fortune. He became a major planter with a plantation on the Yazoo River, a law practice in Port Gibson, and a seat as a judge on the Orphan's Court. He was one of the founders of Jackson, Mississippi, designated as the capital when it became a state.

== Early life ==
Peter Aaron Van Dorn was born on September 12, 1773, near Peapack, New Jersey. He descended from the ethnic Dutch Van Doorn family. Members of this family were elevated to the Dutch nobility in the 19th century. Emigrants to the New World became wealthy farmers, particularly in Monmouth and Somerset counties in New Jersey. His father was Aaron Van Dorn (1744-1830) and his mother, Ghacy Schenck (1748-1820).

He studied theology and law at the College of New Jersey (now Princeton University), graduating in 1795.

== Career in Mississippi ==
Van Dorn first moved to Virginia. After his first wife died there, he moved to the Mississippi Territory at the age of twenty-one.

He became a lawyer in Natchez. In 1804, Territorial Governor William C. C. Claiborne appointed Van Dorn as Marshal of Natchez.

Shortly after, he moved to Port Gibson, Mississippi, forty miles north of Natchez. It had river access and was also on the Natchez Trace, a major route between this area and what became Nashville in Middle Tennessee. Established as the county seat, Port Gibson became a major regional trading center for the cotton-based economy. Van Dorn established a private law practice in Port Gibson and served as clerk of the Circuit Court from about 1810. In 1817, he became Clerk of the Mississippi House of Representatives. He later was appointed as a judge on the Orphan's Court, established after Mississippi became a state. He also acquired a plantation on the Yazoo River, where several of his children were born.

Influenced by Northern practice, Van Dorn was a proponent of establishing public schools in Mississippi, but these were not established until authorized by the biracial legislature during the Reconstruction era after the Civil War. In 1821, he served on a commission alongside Dr William Lattimore and General Thomas Hinds to decide upon the location of the future state capital, Jackson, Mississippi. The new town's plan followed a 'checkerboard' plan suggested by Thomas Jefferson, whereby residential plots would be interspersed by parks and green spaces.

He built what became known as the Van Dorn House, completed about 1830 as his town house in Port Gibson. It was listed on the National Register of Historic Places in 1972.

He designed another house, McGregor, in Port Gibson as a wedding present for one of his daughters. Completed in 1835, it was designed in the Greek Revival architecture style. It was listed on the NRHP in 1979.

Van Dorn also built a house in Grand Gulf, ten miles away from Port Gibson. It was destroyed in the Battle of Grand Gulf in 1863 during the American Civil War. The Grand Gulf Military State Park now encompasses the former property of this house. Additionally, Van Dorn owned a cotton plantation on the Yazoo River and the numerous enslaved African Americans needed to work it.

Van Dorn was a prominent freemason, in the Washington Lodge No. 3 of Port Gibson, Mississippi.

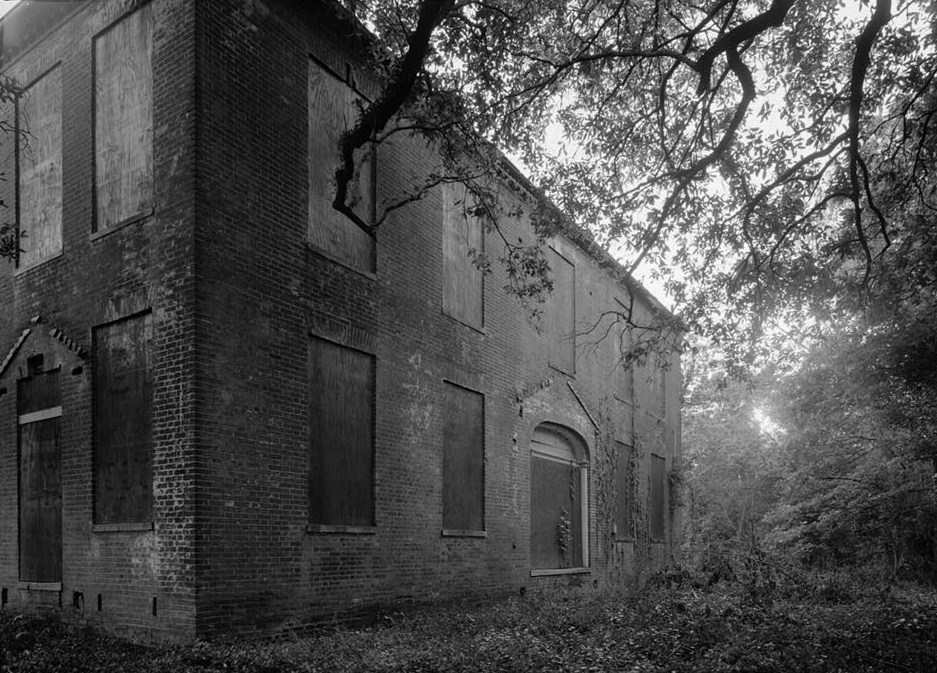
The Van Dorn House in Port Gibson, Mississippi.

=== Personal life ===
Van Dorn's first wife, with whom he had no children, died when they were living in Virginia. On August 18, 1811, after he had moved to Port Gibson, Mississippi and become established, he married Sophia Donelson Caffery. She was the granddaughter of explorer and revolutionary Col. John Donelson, who founded Fort Nashborough. This later developed as Nashville, Tennessee. She was also the niece of Rachel Jackson, President Andrew Jackson's wife. The Van Dorns had nine children before her death in late 1830 or early 1831:

- Mary Van Dorn Lacy (1812–1837)
- Jane Van Dorn Vertner (1815–1870)
- Octavia Van Dorn Ross Sullivane (1816–1897). Her son Clement Sulivane (1838-1920), served in the Confederate States Army (C.S.A.) as aide de camp to his uncle Earl Van Dorn (below) and later was elected to the Maryland Senate.
- Sophia Mabella Van Dorn (1819–1836)
- Earl Van Dorn (1820–1863) attended West Point and became a U.S. Army officer; after the Civil war broke out, he joined the C.S.A., becoming a general during the war. He was killed by a man who thought he was having an affair with his wife.
- Aaron Van Dorn (1822–1874)
- Sarah Ross Van Dorn (1825–1828)
- Emily Donelson Van Dorn Miller (1827–1909)
- Jacob Van Dorn (1829–1837)

== Death ==
Van Dorn wrote and dated his will in 1830. He died on February 12, 1837, at his plantation near the Yazoo River. He was buried with Masonic honors in the Wintergreen Cemetery in Port Gibson, Mississippi. Daniel Vertner was the sole executor of his will.
