= Irwin Russell (poet) =

American poet

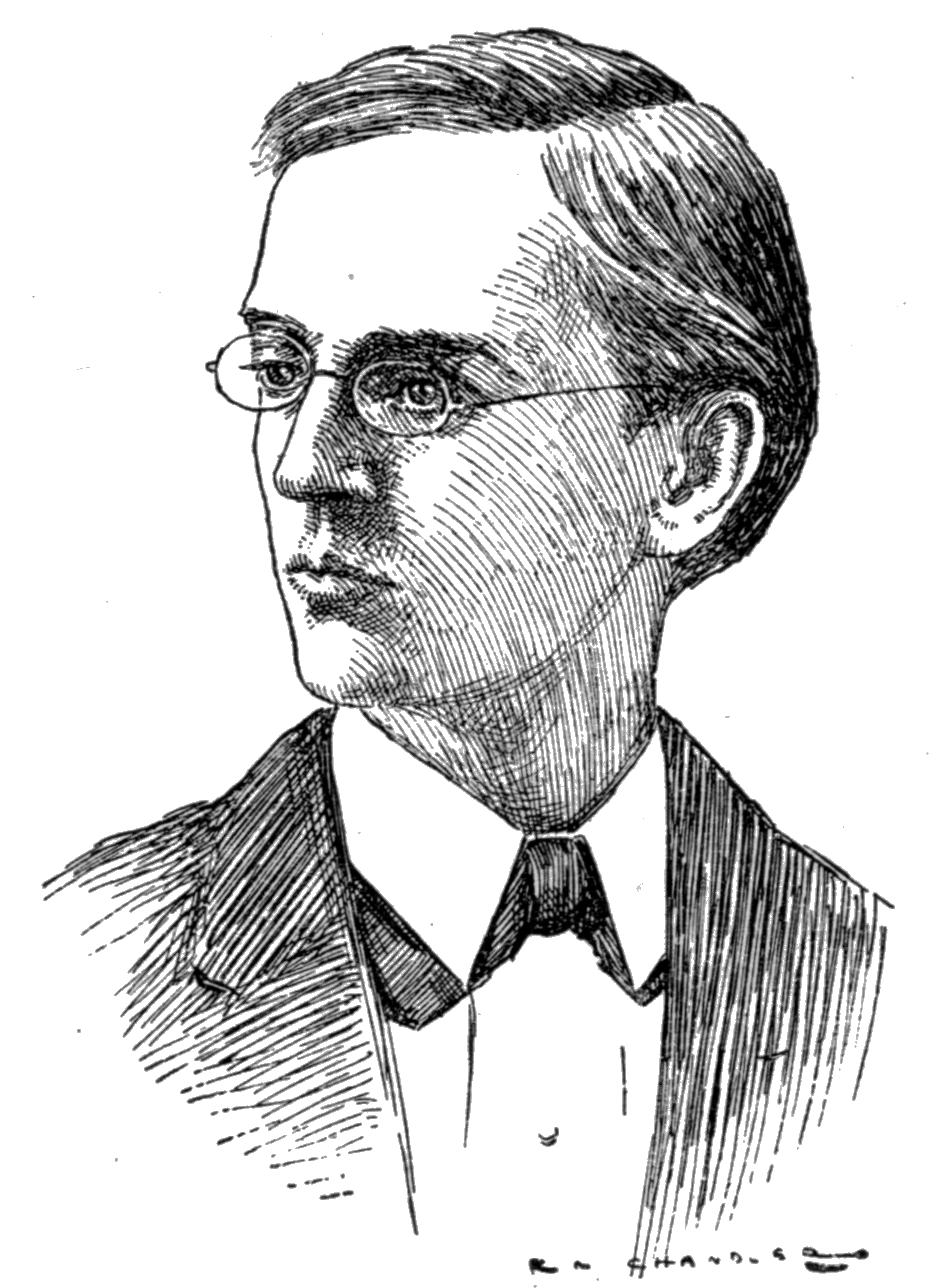
- Born: June 3, 1853; Port Gibson, Mississippi, U.S.
- Died: December 23, 1879 (aged 26); New Orleans, Louisiana, U.S.
- Occupation: Poet

For the American entertainment lawyer, see Irwin Russell.

Irwin Russell (June 3, 1853 - December 23, 1879) was an American poet. His poems were published in Scribner's Magazine and The Times-Democrat. His bust was installed in the Mississippi State Capitol in 1907. He wrote "humorous, sympathetic pictures of the quaintly sage and irresponsibly happy old-time plantation negro."
