= Claiborne County School District =

School district in Mississippi, US

Address
- 404 Market Street Port Gibson, Mississippi, 39150; United States

District information
- Type: Public
- Grades: PK–12
- Schools: 4
- NCES District ID: 2801020

Students and staff
- Students: 1,135 (2025–2026)
- Teachers: 88.00 (on an FTE basis) (2025–2026)
- Staff: 110.10 (on an FTE basis) (2025–2026)
- Student–teacher ratio: 12.90 (2025–2026)

Other information
- Website: www.claiborne.k12.ms.us

The Claiborne County School District is a public school district based in Port Gibson, Mississippi, US (Office located at 404 Market St A, Port Gibson). The district's boundaries parallel that of Claiborne County. They include the employee residences of Alcorn State University.

== Schools ==
- Port Gibson High School
- Port Gibson Middle School
- A. W. Watson Jr. Elementary School

== Demographics ==
=== 2006-07 school year ===
There were a total of 1,899 students enrolled in the Claiborne County School District during the 2006–2007 school year. The gender makeup of the district was 50% female and 50% male. The racial makeup of the district was 99.53% African American and 0.47% White. 99.9% of the district's students were eligible to receive free lunch.

=== Previous school years ===
School Year	Enrollment	Gender Makeup		Racial Makeup				
School Year	Enrollment	Female	Male	Asian	African American	Hispanic	Native American	White
2005-06	1,969	51%	49%	–	99.90%	–	–	0.10%
2004-05	1,864	50%	50%	–	99.57%	–	–	0.43%
2003-04	1,600	51%	49%	0.06%	99.69%	–	–	0.25%
2002-03	1,866	50%	50%	0.05%	99.41%	–	–	0.54%

== Accountability statistics ==
	2006-07	2005-06	2004-05	2003-04	2002-03
District Accreditation Status	Accredited	Accredited	Accredited	Accredited	Accredited
School Performance Classifications
Level 5 (Superior Performing) Schools	0	2	1	1	0
Level 4 (Exemplary) Schools	1	1	1	2	2
Level 3 (Successful) Schools	1	0	1	0	1
Level 2 (Under Performing) Schools	1	0	0	0	0
Level 1 (Low Performing) Schools	0	0	0	0	0
Not Assigned	0	0	0	0	0

== See also ==
- List of school districts in Mississippi
- Chamberlain-Hunt Academy - Private school in Port Gibson
