= Camp Van Dorn =

Military installation in Mississippi

Coordinates: 31.070404°N 90.987510°W

Camp Van Dorn is a former military installation in Centreville, Mississippi, in both Wilkinson and Amite counties. Established in 1942 during World War II, the base was named for Confederate General Earl Van Dorn from Mississippi. Holding up to 30,000 troops for training, it operated until 1946, after which it was declared surplus to government needs.

In 1950, a certificate of clearance was issued. Since then most of the large property has been sold to a variety of landowners. Today the large property is used mostly for timberland and some ranching, but there is potential for other development.

== History ==
The US Army acquired 41,543 acres of land in Wilkinson and Amite counties, Mississippi, to construct a camp for basic and advanced divisional infantry training. It operated from 1942-1946.

As the Army built up its forces, in 1943 some 30,000 soldiers were being trained and serving at Camp Van Dorn. They included about 3,000 African Americans of the 364th Regiment, another 3,653 black troops, and the remainder of the troops were white. The small town of Centerville nearby had 1200 residents.

=== Ordnance and related training ===
During World War II, the installation was established as a U.S. Army basic and advanced divisional infantry training camp. Ordnance training took place at multiple ranges and designated impact areas across the camp. Troop training included use of bayonets, mines, booby traps, bazookas, grenades, rifles, machine guns and field artillery."

== Postwar years ==
After World War II, Camp Van Dorn was declared surplus and clearance activities were conducted. The Army issued a certificate of clearance in 1950: it recommended that two former impact areas be restricted to surface use only. All other inspected artillery and bombing ranges could be used for any suitable purpose. Ownership of the former Camp Van Dorn land was transferred by the War Assets Administration by October 1950. Since the 1990s the Army has been concerned about ordnance finds and other hazards at this and other formerly used defense sites (FUDS).

In the early 21st century, the lands within the former Camp Van Dorn are owned by many private individuals. Most of the land is used for pasture and timberland, and there are some scattered private residences. However, land use was changing rapidly. There appeared to be potential for oil and gas development, and small residential ranches.

Because current standards and technology support a higher level of environmental cleanup of former munitions areas, Defense developed the Defense Environmental Restoration Program for Formerly Used Defense Sites (FUDS) such as Camp Van Dorn. In 2015 the United States Army Corps of Engineers (ACE) announced that it would be conducting a remedial investigation at the former Camp Van Dorn. It was to start in 2016 and estimated to take six months, based on a review of written documentation and use of geophysical mapping and related methods. Depending on what was found, remedial alternatives would be identified.

== See also ==
- List of World War II prisoner-of-war camps in the United States
