= Joseph Dunbar (scientist) =

American scientist and medical doctor

Joseph Dunbar (born 1944) is an American scientist Ph.D. in Physiology whose specialization is diabetes. His major research interests are the relationships between insulin and glucagon and their physiology.

Dunbar was born in Vicksburg, Mississippi, on August 27, 1944, to college-educated parents. His mother was a teacher, his father was an agricultural specialist who worked for the US government. He attended Alcorn College High School and graduated from Port Gibson High School, in 1960, where he took available advanced science courses. Like both his parents he attended Alcorn State University, where (encouraged by his biology and chemistry teachers) he decided to become a scientist. After graduating college, he taught music in a high school, and the following year enrolled at Texas Southern University, graduating in with a MS in biology in 1966, and he stayed on for a year as a biology instructor. During that time he married Agnes Estorge; the two married in 1967. They have two daughters Andrea Denise (1971) and Erica Kaye (1975). In 1967, he enrolled in the doctoral program at Wayne State University, and began his career working in diabetes research. Other notables are Chairman Dept. Physiology Wayne State University(WSU) School of Medicine (SOM)(1998-2007);Assoc. VP Research WSU 2008-2016; Director of Medical Student Research(2016-2021) and Principal Investigator of multiple diabetes research and student training programs. He is currently a Professor in the Department of Physiology at Wayne State University.
