= Jay Disharoon =

American politician and lawyer (1949 – 2014)

James Dudley "Jay" Disharoon (March 10, 1949 – June 10, 2014) was an American lawyer and politician.

Born in Jackson, Mississippi, Disharoon grew up in Port Gibson, Mississippi and went to Port Gibson High School. He served in the United States Army. Disharoon received his bachelor's degree from Mississippi State University and his Juris Doctor degree from University of Mississippi School of Law. He served in the Mississippi House of Representatives, from 1976 to 1980, as a Democrat and then in the Mississippi State Senate from 1980 to 1988. Disharoon and his son Jamie were killed in a traffic accident in Jackson, Mississippi.
