= Wintergreen Cemetery =

Historic cemetery in Claiborne County, Mississippi, US

- U.S. National Register of Historic Places
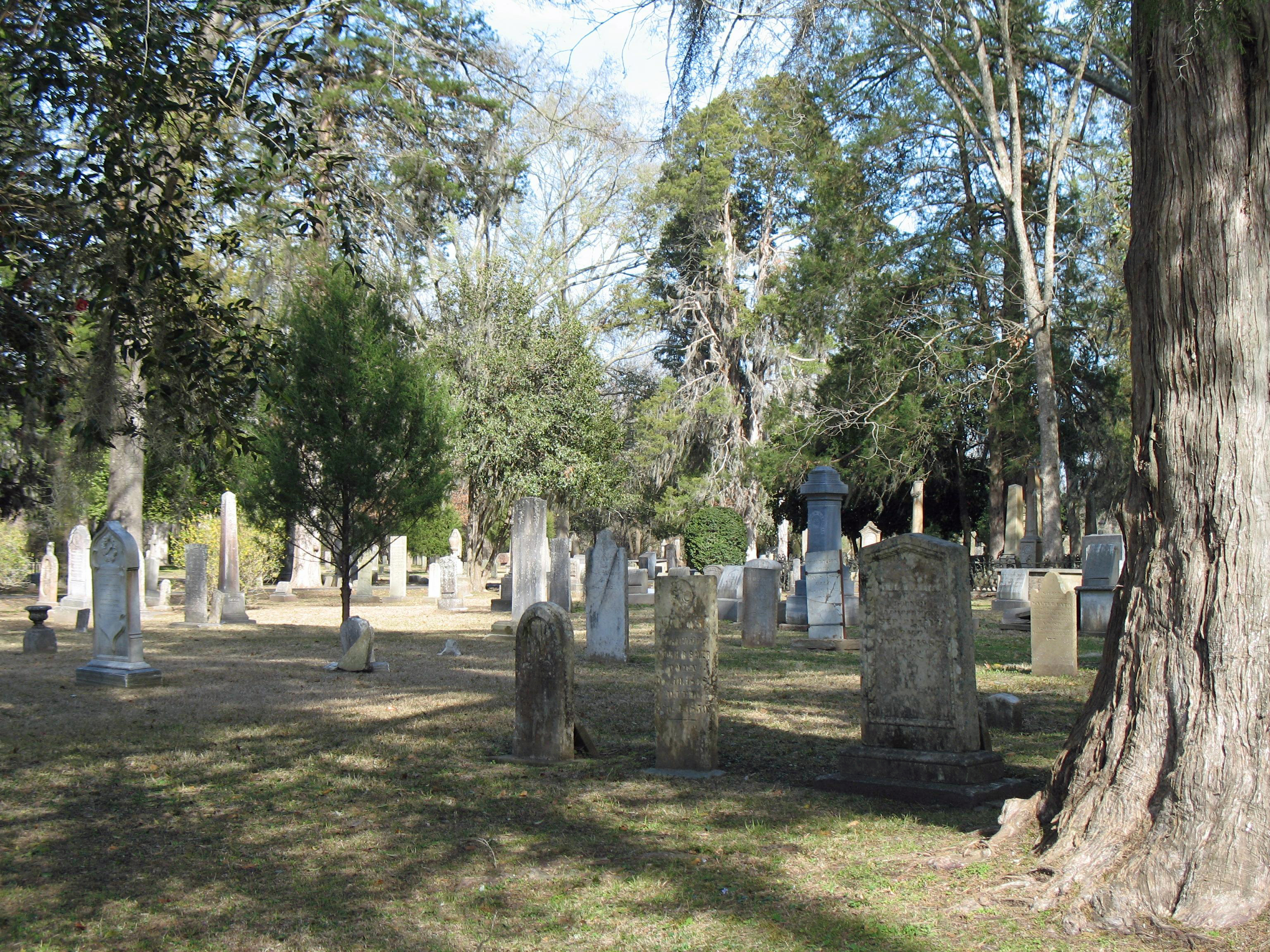

- Location within Mississippi Location within the United States
- Location: E. Greenwood St., Port Gibson, Mississippi
- Coordinates: 31°57′06″N 90°58′45″W
- Area: 8 acres (3.2 ha)
- MPS: Historic Cemeteries of Port Gibson TR
- NRHP reference No.: 79003414
- Added to NRHP: July 22, 1979

Wintergreen Cemetery is a historic cemetery in Port Gibson, Mississippi. It was added to the National Register of Historic Places on July 22, 1979. It is located at East Greenwood Street.

== Notable burials ==
- Samuel Reading Bertron (1865–1938), banker
- Benjamin G. Humphreys (1808–1882), Civil War general
- James G. Spencer (1844–1926), US Representative
- Earl Van Dorn (1820–1863), Civil War general
- Peter Aaron Van Dorn (1773–1837) lawyer and plantation owner, father of Earl, above.

== See also ==
- National Register of Historic Places listings in Claiborne County, Mississippi
