= Port Gibson, Mississippi =

- City
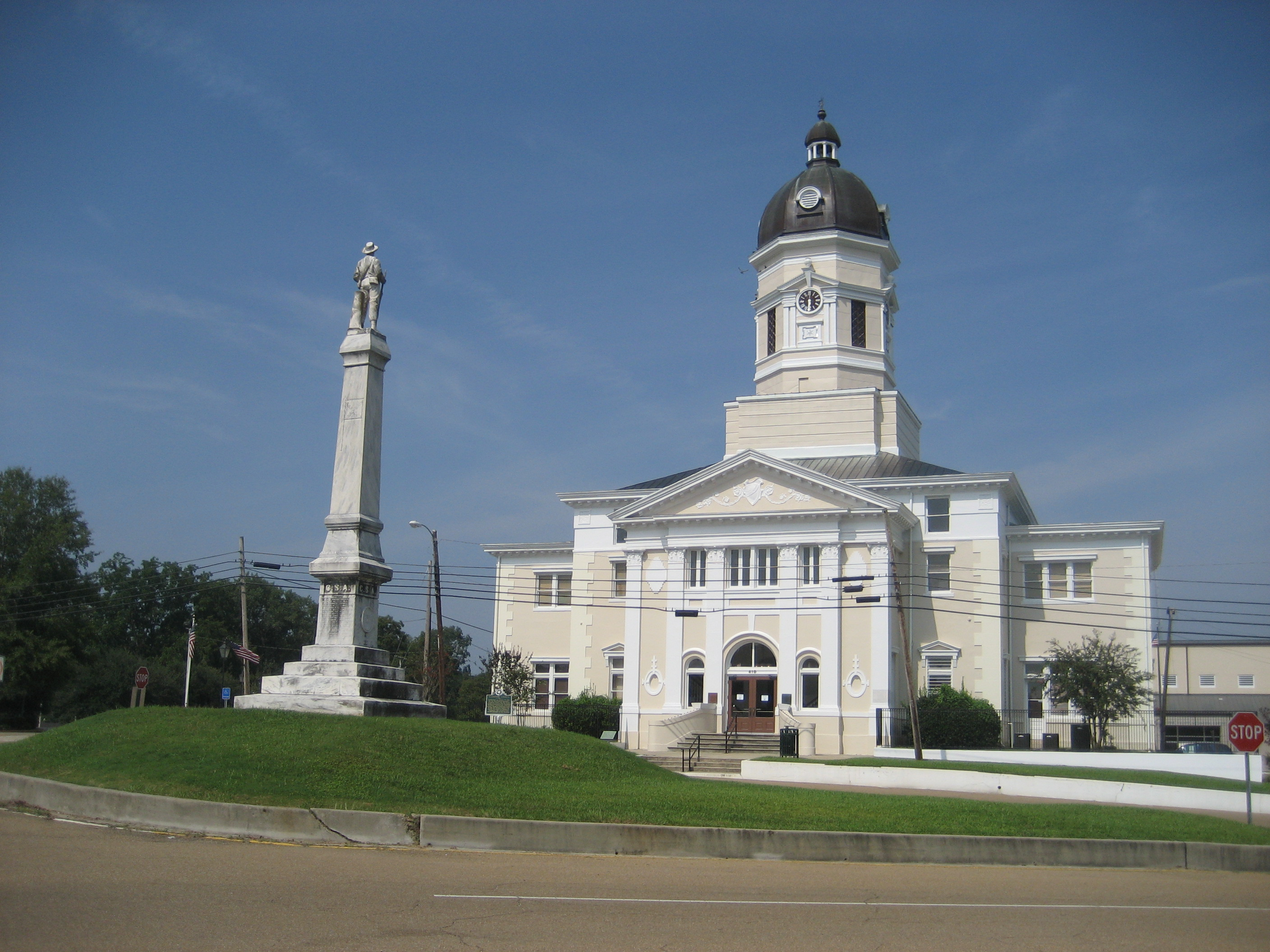
- Claiborne County Courthouse and Confederate monument in Port Gibson

- Flag
- Motto: "Too beautiful to burn"
- Location of Port Gibson, Mississippi

- Location in the United States
- Coordinates: 31°57′22″N 90°58′59″W
- Country: United States
- State: Mississippi
- County: Claiborne

Government
  - Mayor: Willie A. White

Area
  - Total: 1.76 sq mi (4.55 km^{2})
  - Land: 1.76 sq mi (4.55 km^{2})
  - Water: 0 sq mi (0.00 km^{2})
- Elevation: 118 ft (36 m)

Population (2020)
  - Total: 1,269
  - Density: 723.1/sq mi (279.18/km^{2})
- Time zone: UTC-6 (Central (CST))
  - Summer (DST): UTC-5 (CDT)
- ZIP code: 39150
- Area code: 601
- FIPS code: 28-59560
- GNIS feature ID: 0676254

Port Gibson is a city and the county seat of Claiborne County, Mississippi, United States. As of the 2020 census, Port Gibson had a population of 1,269. It is bordered on the west by the Mississippi River.

The first European settlers in Port Gibson were French colonists in 1729. In 1795, Pinckney's Treaty established the area as United States territory, and the town was chartered in 1803, the same year that France's land across the Mississippi was acquired in the Louisiana Purchase. To develop cotton plantations in the area after Indian Removal of the 1830s, planters who moved to the state brought with them or imported thousands of enslaved Africans from the Upper South, disrupting many families. Well before the Civil War, the majority of the county's population were enslaved.

Several notable people are natives of Port Gibson. The town saw action during the American Civil War. Port Gibson has several historical sites listed on the National Register of Historic Places (National Register of Historic Places listings in Claiborne County, Mississippi).

In the twentieth century, Port Gibson was home to The Rabbit's Foot Company. It had a substantial role in the development of blues in Mississippi, operating taverns and juke joints now included on the Mississippi Blues Trail.

In the second half of the twentieth century many jobs in agriculture were lost because of industrialization, which, combined with a lack of other jobs, has led to a substantial loss of population and to poverty in the city and the surrounding county. Port Gibson's population peaked in 1950. The last major employer, the Port Gibson Oil Works, a cottonseed mill, closed in 2002.

== History ==
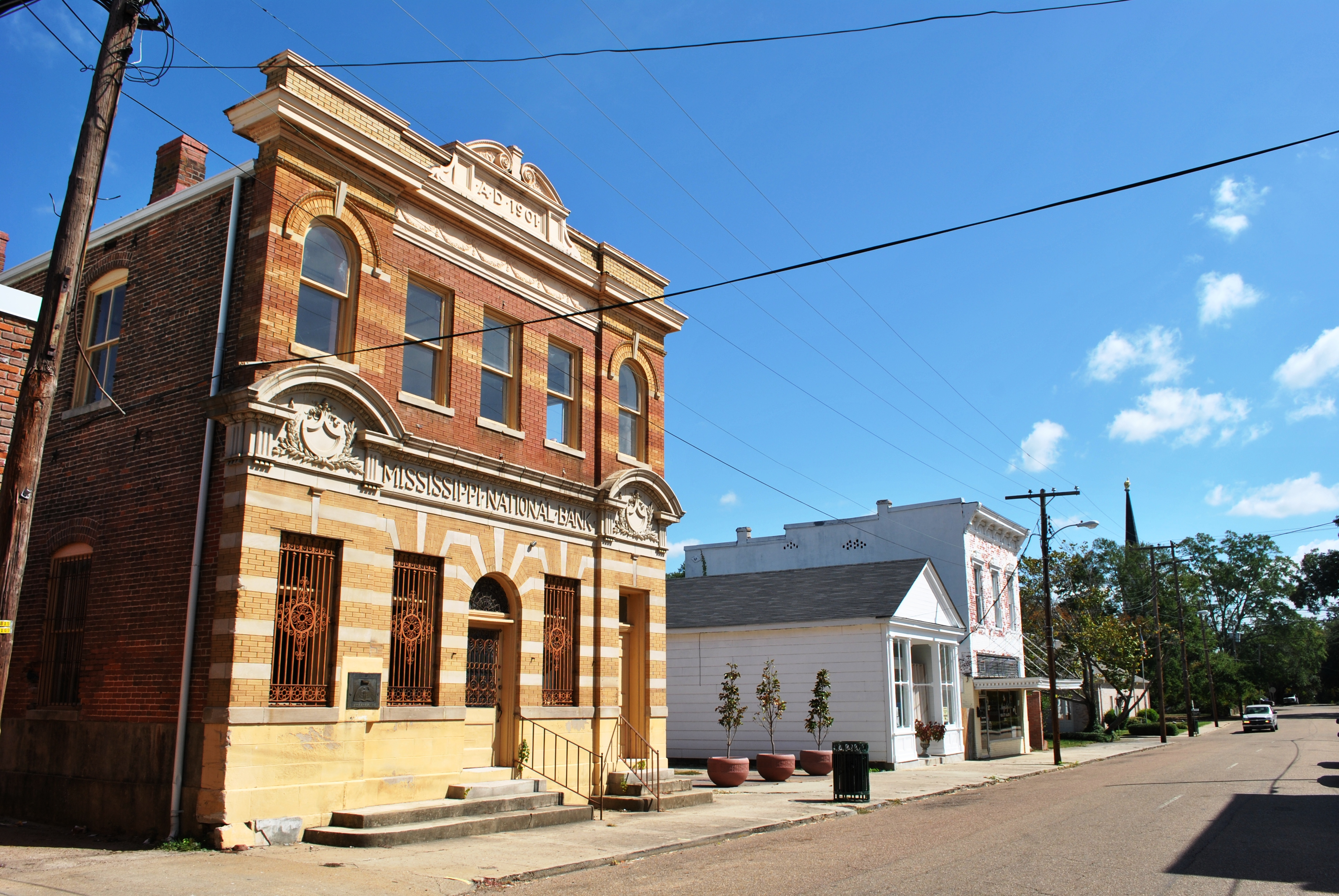
Market Street-Suburb Ste. Mary Historic District

Port Gibson is the third-oldest European-American settlement in Mississippi. Its development began in 1729 by French colonists and was then within French-claimed territory known as La Louisiane. The British acquired this area after the French ceded their colonies east of the Mississippi River in 1763, following their defeat in the Seven Years' War.

Following the U.S. acquisition of former French territory through the Louisiana Purchase of 1803, more Americans entered the area. Port Gibson was chartered as a town that year on March 12, 1803. The federal government carried out Indian Removal in the 1830s, pushing the Five Civilized Tribes, including the Choctaw and Chickasaw peoples, west of the Mississippi River to Indian Territory. It took over their lands in the Southeast for sale and development by European Americans.

Planters developed cotton plantations in the fertile river lowlands of the Mississippi Delta and other riverfront areas, dependent on the labor of enslaved Africans, initially brought from the Upper South. The African Americans comprised a majority in the county before the Civil War, and this continued.

With international demand high for cotton, such planters prospered. As the planter population increased, they founded the Port Gibson Female College in 1843 to educate their daughters. The college later closed and one of its buildings now serves as the city hall. Similarly, they founded Chamberlain-Hunt Academy in 1879, a military preparatory boarding school which became co-ed in 1971. CHA was the legacy of Oakland College founded in 1830 in nearby Lorman. Oakland was closed during the Civil War and the Oakland campus was sold to the State of Mississippi to create Alcorn A&M College, the first land-grant college for African Americans. Chamberlain-Hunt closed its doors in 2014. In 1990, the first African American students graduated from Chamberlain-Hunt.

Port Gibson was the site of several clashes during the American Civil War and figured in Union General Ulysses S. Grant's Vicksburg Campaign. He was attempting to gain control over the Mississippi River. The Battle of Port Gibson occurred on May 1, 1863, and resulted in the deaths of more than 200 Union and Confederate soldiers. The Confederate defeat resulted in their losing the ability to hold Mississippi and defend against an amphibious attack.

=== Later nineteenth century to present ===
Reportedly, many of the historic buildings in the town survived the Civil War because Grant proclaimed the city to be "too beautiful to burn". These words appear on the sign marking the city limits.

Despite postwar economic upheaval, the city continued as a center of trade and economy associated with cotton. In 1882, the Port Gibson Oil Works started operating, established as one of the first cottonseed oil plants in the United States. This historic industrial building was listed on the National Register of Historic Places in 1979. The mill finally closed in 2002.

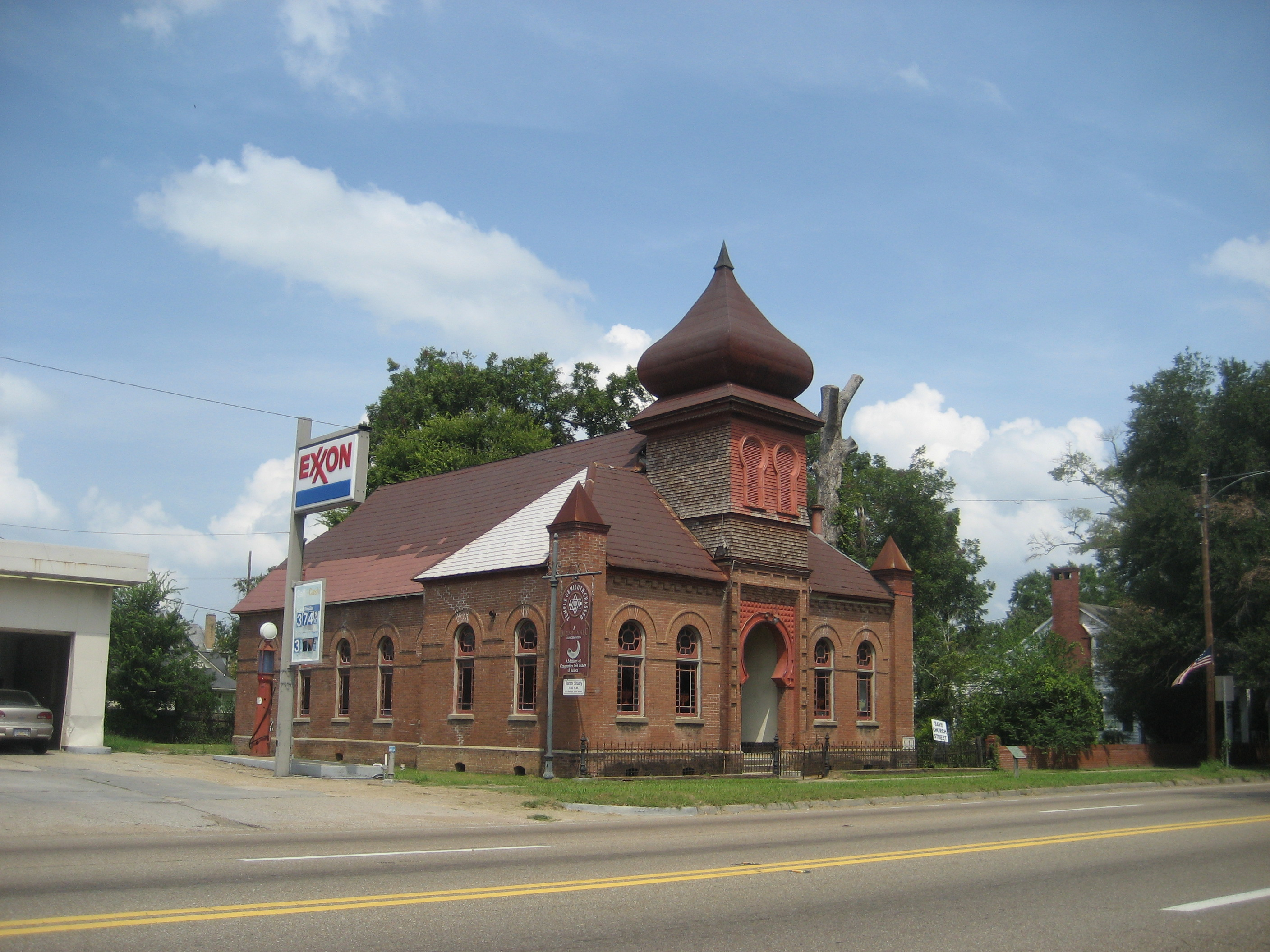
Gemiluth Chessed synagogue

Gemiluth Chessed synagogue, built in 1892, had an active congregation when the town was thriving as the county seat and a trading center. It had attracted nineteenth-century Jewish immigrants from the German states and Alsace-Lorraine. After starting as peddlers, the later generations of men became cotton brokers and merchants. This is the oldest synagogue and the only Moorish Revival building in the state. It is topped by a Russian-style dome. As the economy changed, the Jewish population gradually moved to larger cities and areas offering more opportunity, and none remain in Port Gibson.

The Rabbit's Foot Company was established in 1900 by Pat Chappelle, an African-American theatre owner in Tampa, Florida. This was the leading traveling vaudeville show in the southern states, with an all-black cast of singers, musicians, comedians, and entertainers.

After Chappelle's death in 1911, the company was taken over by Fred Swift Wolcott, a white planter. After 1918, he based the touring company at his plantation near Port Gibson, with offices in town. He continued to manage it until 1950, when he sold it. The Rabbit's Foot Company remained popular, but as some white performers joined and used blackface, it was no longer considered "authentic".

In 2002 the New York Times characterized Port Gibson as 80 percent black and poor, with 20 percent of families living on incomes of less than $10,000 a year, according to the 2000 Census.

== Legacy ==
A Mississippi Blues Trail marker was placed in Port Gibson to commemorate the contribution the Rabbit's Foot Company made to the development of the blues in Mississippi, in its decades of operation after the founder's death.

In 2006, an exhibition, The Blues in Claiborne County: From Rabbit Foot Minstrels to Blues and Cruise, was shown in Port Gibson, exploring the history of the show, with artifacts and memorabilia.

== Other National Register of Historic Places buildings and sites ==
- Van Dorn House, completed c. 1830, built by Peter Aaron Van Dorn, a lawyer, planter, and judge
- McGregor, house designed in Greek Revival style by Van Dorn (above) for one of his daughters, completed 1835
- Windsor Ruins, 23 columns of a plantation house that burned c. 1890, located about ten miles southwest of the city that have been featured in two motion pictures
- Wintergreen Cemetery, historic cemetery with burials of notable residents

== Geography ==
According to the United States Census Bureau, the city has a total area of 1.8 square miles (4.7 km^{2}), all land.

=== Climate ===
Port Gibson has a humid subtropical climate (Köppen Cfa) with long, hot summers and short, mild winters.

Climate data for Port Gibson, Mississippi (1991–2020, extremes 1893–present)
| Month | Jan | Feb | Mar | Apr | May | Jun | Jul | Aug | Sep | Oct | Nov | Dec | Year |
|---|---|---|---|---|---|---|---|---|---|---|---|---|---|
| Record high °F (°C) | 88 (31) | 87 (31) | 94 (34) | 94 (34) | 99 (37) | 104 (40) | 104 (40) | 107 (42) | 105 (41) | 97 (36) | 89 (32) | 84 (29) | 107 (42) |
| Mean maximum °F (°C) | 75.7 (24.3) | 78.4 (25.8) | 83.6 (28.7) | 86.7 (30.4) | 91.0 (32.8) | 94.5 (34.7) | 96.7 (35.9) | 97.5 (36.4) | 95.2 (35.1) | 89.9 (32.2) | 81.7 (27.6) | 76.9 (24.9) | 98.4 (36.9) |
| Mean daily maximum °F (°C) | 59.5 (15.3) | 63.7 (17.6) | 71.0 (21.7) | 77.9 (25.5) | 84.9 (29.4) | 90.5 (32.5) | 92.9 (33.8) | 93.4 (34.1) | 89.1 (31.7) | 80.1 (26.7) | 69.1 (20.6) | 61.5 (16.4) | 77.8 (25.4) |
| Daily mean °F (°C) | 47.6 (8.7) | 50.9 (10.5) | 58.4 (14.7) | 65.2 (18.4) | 73.2 (22.9) | 79.8 (26.6) | 82.3 (27.9) | 82.2 (27.9) | 77.2 (25.1) | 66.6 (19.2) | 55.9 (13.3) | 49.8 (9.9) | 65.8 (18.8) |
| Mean daily minimum °F (°C) | 35.7 (2.1) | 38.1 (3.4) | 45.9 (7.7) | 52.5 (11.4) | 61.5 (16.4) | 69.1 (20.6) | 71.8 (22.1) | 70.9 (21.6) | 65.3 (18.5) | 53.1 (11.7) | 42.7 (5.9) | 38.1 (3.4) | 53.7 (12.1) |
| Mean minimum °F (°C) | 19.7 (−6.8) | 23.5 (−4.7) | 27.4 (−2.6) | 36.0 (2.2) | 46.3 (7.9) | 58.8 (14.9) | 64.5 (18.1) | 63.0 (17.2) | 50.8 (10.4) | 36.7 (2.6) | 26.5 (−3.1) | 22.6 (−5.2) | 17.8 (−7.9) |
| Record low °F (°C) | −5 (−21) | −7 (−22) | 15 (−9) | 26 (−3) | 34 (1) | 45 (7) | 51 (11) | 51 (11) | 35 (2) | 23 (−5) | 15 (−9) | 4 (−16) | −7 (−22) |
| Average precipitation inches (mm) | 6.10 (155) | 5.06 (129) | 6.01 (153) | 5.45 (138) | 4.47 (114) | 4.05 (103) | 3.94 (100) | 3.56 (90) | 3.75 (95) | 4.11 (104) | 4.44 (113) | 5.32 (135) | 56.26 (1,429) |
| Average snowfall inches (cm) | 0.2 (0.51) | 0.2 (0.51) | 0.1 (0.25) | 0.0 (0.0) | 0.0 (0.0) | 0.0 (0.0) | 0.0 (0.0) | 0.0 (0.0) | 0.0 (0.0) | 0.0 (0.0) | 0.0 (0.0) | 0.0 (0.0) | 0.5 (1.3) |
| Average precipitation days (≥ 0.01 in) | 9.9 | 8.4 | 8.8 | 7.6 | 7.9 | 8.9 | 9.4 | 8.3 | 6.8 | 5.8 | 7.4 | 8.8 | 98.0 |
| Average snowy days (≥ 0.1 in) | 0.1 | 0.0 | 0.1 | 0.0 | 0.0 | 0.0 | 0.0 | 0.0 | 0.0 | 0.0 | 0.0 | 0.0 | 0.2 |
Source: NOAAIEM

== Demographics ==
Historical population
| Census | Pop. | Note | %± |
|---|---|---|---|
| 1890 | 1,524 | | — |
| 1900 | 2,113 | | 38.6% |
| 1910 | 2,252 | | 6.6% |
| 1920 | 1,691 | | −24.9% |
| 1930 | 1,861 | | 10.1% |
| 1940 | 2,748 | | 47.7% |
| 1950 | 2,920 | | 6.3% |
| 1960 | 2,861 | | −2.0% |
| 1970 | 2,589 | | −9.5% |
| 1980 | 2,371 | | −8.4% |
| 1990 | 1,810 | | −23.7% |
| 2000 | 1,840 | | 1.7% |
| 2010 | 1,567 | | −14.8% |
| 2020 | 1,269 | | −19.0% |
U.S. Decennial Census

=== Racial and ethnic composition ===
Port Gibson city, Mississippi – Racial and ethnic composition Note: the US Census treats Hispanic/Latino as an ethnic category. This table excludes Latinos from the racial categories and assigns them to a separate category. Hispanics/Latinos may be of any race.
| Race / Ethnicity (NH = Non-Hispanic) | Pop 2000 | Pop 2010 | Pop 2020 | % 2000 | % 2010 | % 2020 |
|---|---|---|---|---|---|---|
| White alone (NH) | 357 | 225 | 122 | 19.40% | 14.36% | 9.61% |
| Black or African American alone (NH) | 1,460 | 1,320 | 1,122 | 79.35% | 84.24% | 88.42% |
| Native American or Alaska Native alone (NH) | 1 | 0 | 0 | 0.05% | 0.00% | 0.00% |
| Asian alone (NH) | 4 | 9 | 0 | 0.22% | 0.57% | 0.00% |
| Native Hawaiian or Pacific Islander alone (NH) | 0 | 0 | 0 | 0.00% | 0.00% | 0.00% |
| Other race alone (NH) | 0 | 5 | 0 | 0.00% | 0.32% | 0.00% |
| Mixed race or Multiracial (NH) | 5 | 1 | 20 | 0.27% | 0.06% | 1.58% |
| Hispanic or Latino (any race) | 13 | 7 | 5 | 0.71% | 0.45% | 0.39% |
| Total | 1,840 | 1,567 | 1,269 | 100.00% | 100.00% | 100.00% |

As of the 2020 United States census, there were 1,269 people, 554 households, and 290 families residing in the city.

== Education ==
Port Gibson is served by the Claiborne County School District. Port Gibson High School is the comprehensive high school of the district.

The Chamberlain-Hunt Academy, a private military boarding school, opened in Port Gibson in 1879. It was promoted as a Christian school in the late twentieth century. Nonetheless, it suffered declining enrollment and closed in 2014.

== Notable people ==
- Samuel Reading Bertron, banker
- Cleo W. Blackburn, educator
- Pete Brown, golfer, first African American to win on the PGA Tour
- Jay Disharoon, lawyer and Mississippi legislator
- Lil Green, blues and R&B singer and songwriter
- Henry Hughes, lawyer, sociologist, state senator, and Confederate colonel
- Yolanda Moore, former professional basketball player and girls basketball coach
- Jacob S. Raisin, rabbi
- Irwin Russell, poet
- Bob Shannon, high school football coach, known for his work in East St. Louis, Illinois
- V. C. Shannon, born in Port Gibson in 1910, one-term member of the Louisiana House of Representatives from Shreveport, serving from 1972 to 1974
- J. D. Short, Delta blues guitarist, singer, and harmonicist
- James G. Spencer, U.S. Representative from 1895 to 1897
- Clement Sulivane, Confederate officer, politician, and member of the Maryland Senate from 1878 to 1880
- Earl Van Dorn, Confederate Civil War general
- Peter Aaron Van Dorn, lawyer, judge, plantation owner, and one of the founders of Jackson, Mississippi
- James E. Winfield (1944–2000), civil rights attorney, city prosecutor, and politician; born in Port Gibson
- F. S. Wolcott (1882–1967), minstrel show proprietor

== See also ==
- NAACP v. Claiborne Hardware Co.
