= Earl Van Dorn =

Confederate States Army general

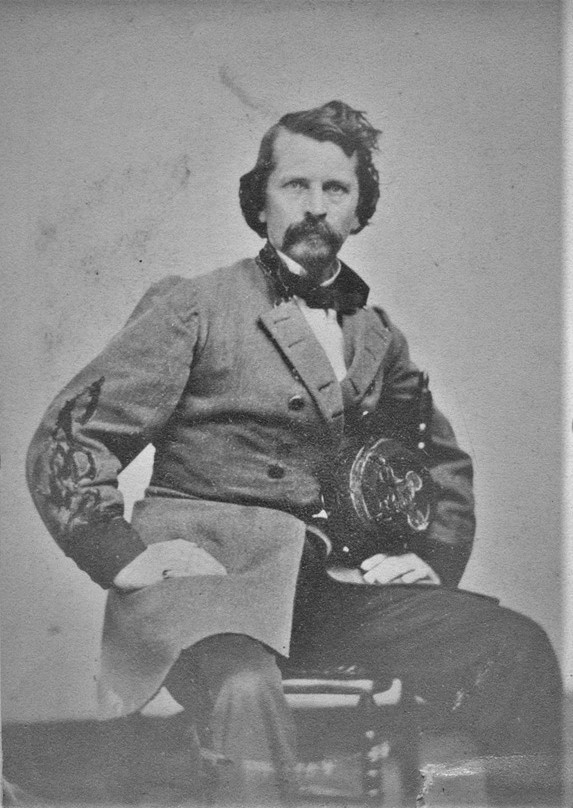
- Van Dorn in uniform, c. 1862
- Born: September 17, 1820; Claiborne County, Mississippi, U.S.
- Died: May 7, 1863 (aged 42); Spring Hill, Tennessee, U.S.
- Burial place: Wintergreen Cemetery, Port Gibson, Mississippi, U.S.
- Military career
- Allegiance: United States; Confederate States
- Branch: United States Army; Confederate States Army
- Service years: 1842–1861 (U.S.); 1861–1863 (C.S.)
- Rank: Major (U.S.); Major-General (C.S.)
- Nicknames: "Buck" and "Damn Born"
- Commands: Trans-Mississippi Department; Army of the West; Army of the Potomac; Army of Mississippi
- Conflicts: Mexican–American War; Siege of Fort Texas; Battle of Monterey; Siege of Vera Cruz; Battle of Contreras; Battle of Cerro Gordo; Battle of Churubusco; Battle for Mexico City; American Indian Wars; Seminole Wars; Comanche Wars; American Civil War; Battle of Pea Ridge; Second Battle of Corinth; Holly Springs Raid; Battle of Thompson's Station; First Battle of Franklin

Earl Van Dorn (September 17, 1820 – May 7, 1863) was a Confederate Major General who started his military career as a United States Army officer and became famous for successfully leading two defenses of a Native American settlement from the Comanche. He joined Confederate forces in 1861 after the Civil War broke out and was a major general when he was killed in a private conflict.

A great-nephew of Andrew Jackson, he received an appointment to the United States Military Academy, graduating in 1842. Earl Van Dorn was known for fighting with distinction during the Mexican–American War and in defense of Native-American settlements against the attacking Comanche in the West in addition to his impressive victories as a cavalry commander during the American Civil War.

Although he opposed the secession of slave states in 1861, Van Dorn sided with the Confederacy in the ensuing civil war. Fighting in the Western Theater as a major general, he captured the Union transport ship Star of the West at Matagorda Bay, forcing the first surrender of the Civil War—a move that drew national attention and led President Lincoln to label him a pirate.

He was later appointed commander of the Trans-Mississippi District. At the Battle of Pea Ridge, Arkansas, in early March 1862, Van Dorn was commanding infantry rather than cavalry, which was his expertise, and was defeated by a smaller Union force. He had abandoned his supply wagons for speed, leaving his men under-equipped in cold weather. At the Second Battle of Corinth in October 1862, he was again commanding infantry. The battle was later described by Confederate President Jefferson Davis as an "impossibility" because many soldiers Van Dorn had inherited were starving and diseased. Davis said that Van Dorn handled the command "masterfully".

Van Dorn scored two additional notable successes as a cavalry commander, capturing a large U.S. supply depot in the Holly Springs Raid, embarrassing U.S. General Ulysses S. Grant by saving Vicksburg and protecting the Confederacy's main port.

His next success was the Battle of Thompson's Station, Tennessee.

Van Dorn's reputation was restored but short-lived. In May 1863, he was shot dead at his headquarters at Spring Hill by a doctor who claimed that Van Dorn had carried on an affair with his wife.

== Early life and career ==
Van Dorn was born near Port Gibson, Mississippi, on September 17, 1820. His parents were Sophia Donelson Caffery, a niece of Andrew Jackson, and Peter Aaron Van Dorn, a lawyer who had moved from New Jersey years earlier. He had eight siblings, including sisters Emily Van Dorn Miller and Octavia Van Dorn (Ross) Sulivane. His sister Octavia had a son, Clement Sulivane, who became a captain in the CSA forces and served on Van Dorn's staff; he later was promoted to lieutenant colonel.

In 1838, Van Dorn enrolled in the United States Military Academy at West Point. His mother's connection to Andrew Jackson secured him an appointment there. He graduated 52nd out of 68 cadets in the class of 1842 with the low rank largely due to 163 demerits given for failing to salute in passing, tobacco, and profanity. He was appointed a brevet second lieutenant in the 7th U.S. Infantry Regiment on July 1, 1842, and began his army service in the Southern United States.

After graduation, in December 1843, he married Caroline Godbold, daughter of a prominent Alabama planter family. They had two children together: son Earl Van Dorn Jr. (1855–?) and daughter Olivia (1852–1878).

Van Dorn and the 7th were on garrison duty at Fort Pike, Louisiana, in 1842–43, and were stationed at Fort Morgan, Alabama, briefly in 1843. He did garrison duty at the Mount Vernon Arsenal in Alabama from 1843 into 1844. He was ordered to Pensacola harbor in Florida from 1844 to 1845, during which Van Dorn was promoted to second lieutenant on November 30, 1844.

=== Fame, attractiveness, and womanizing ===
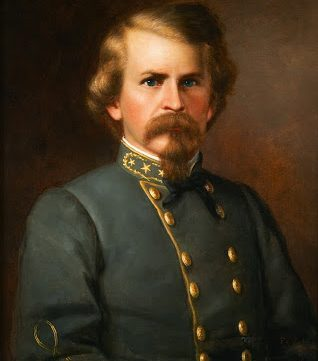
Gen. Earl Van Dorn (colorized)

The blond-haired, blue-eyed Earl Van Dorn had a wide reputation for being desired by women, and this was evident when he traveled. His stardom was compounded following his victories over the Comanche and tales of his heroics in the Mexican-American War. According to historian Arthur B. Carter, "...Van Dorn had ample opportunity to participate in the social life of the community. Handsome, debonair, and polished, he presented a dashing figure in Confederate gray, so it was not surprising that he was a major attraction and the center of attention at public and private events. His knowledge of the social graces, coupled with his upbringing and education, drew attractive women to him, which he apparently did little to discourage."

The New York Times concurred, stating, "It's true that Van Dorn was enormously attractive to many women — one memoirist wrote that 'his bearing attracted, his address delighted, his accomplishments made women worship him.'"

=== War with Mexico ===
Van Dorn was part of the 7th U.S. Infantry when Texas was occupied by the U.S. Army from 1845 into 1846. During the early stages of the Mexican–American War, he was garrisoned at Fort Texas (Fort Brown) in Brownsville, defending the border from the southernmost town in Texas.

Van Dorn saw action at the Battle of Monterrey on September 21–23, 1846, and during the Siege of Vera Cruz from March 9–29, 1847. He was transferred to Gen. Winfield Scott's command in early 1847 and promoted to first lieutenant on March 3. Van Dorn fought well in the rest of his engagements in Mexico, earning himself two brevet promotions for performance; he was appointed a brevet captain on April 18 for his participation at the Battle of Cerro Gordo, and to major on August 20 for his actions near Mexico City, including the Battle of Contreras, the Battle of Churubusco, and at the Belén Gate. Van Dorn was wounded in the foot near Mexico City on September 3, and wounded again during the storming of Belén Gate on September 13.

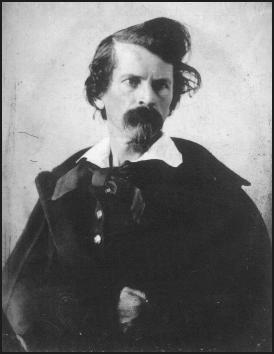
Van Dorn in early life

After the war with Mexico, Van Dorn served as aide-de-camp to Brev. Maj. Gen Persifor F. Smith from April 3, 1847, to May 20, 1848. He and the 7th were in garrison at Baton Rouge, Louisiana, from 1848 into 1849. Later in 1849, they served at Jefferson Barracks in Lemay, Missouri, south of St. Louis. He saw action in Florida against the Seminoles from 1849 to 1850 as the United States tried to dislodge them from the region. Some Seminoles succeeded in evading those efforts and survived in the Everglades; they were the ancestors of two federally recognized Seminole tribes in Florida today. Van Dorn served with the recruiting service in 1850 and 1851.

From 1852 to 1855, Van Dorn was stationed at the East Pascagoula Branch Military Asylum in Mississippi, serving as secretary and then treasurer of the post. He spent the remainder of 1855 stationed at New Orleans, Louisiana, briefly on recruiting service again, and later garrisoned again at Jefferson Barracks. He was promoted to captain in the 2nd Cavalry on March 3, 1855.

Van Dorn and the 2nd were on frontier duty at Fort Belknap and Camp Cooper, Texas, in 1855 and 1856, scouting in northern Texas in 1856 and fought a minor skirmish with Comanche on July 1, 1856. He was assigned to Camp Colorado, Texas, from 1856 to 1857, scouting duty again in 1857, returned to Camp Colorado from 1857 to 1858, and was finally stationed in 1858 at Fort Chadbourne located in Coke County, Texas.

=== Battles Against Comanche ===
Van Dorn saw further action against Native Americans: separately against the Seminole, many of whom had been removed to Indian Territory. He also successfully led an offensive against the Comanche, who attacked new Native American settlements there that the United States had promised to protect. The U.S. military had struggled against the Comanche, but Van Dorn's vanquishing of the Comanche was described as "a victory more decisive and complete in the history of Indian warfare" by General David Emmanuel Twiggs.

He was wounded four separate times while in Indian Territory, including seriously when he commanded the first expedition against the Comanche and took two arrows (one in his left arm and another in his right side, injuring his stomach and a lung) at the Battle of Wichita Village on October 1, 1858. Not expected to live, Van Dorn recovered in five weeks. He led six companies of cavalry and a company of scouts recruited from the Brazos Reservation in a spring campaign against the Comanche in 1859. He located the camp of Buffalo Hump in Kansas (in a valley he erroneously identified as the Nescutunga or Nessentunga) and defeated them on May 13, 1859. His forces killed 49 persons, wounded five, and captured 32 Comanche women.

He served at Fort Mason, Texas, in 1859 and 1860. While at Fort Mason, Van Dorn was promoted to major on June 28, 1860. He was absent from the U.S. Army for the rest of 1860 and into 1861.

== American Civil War ==
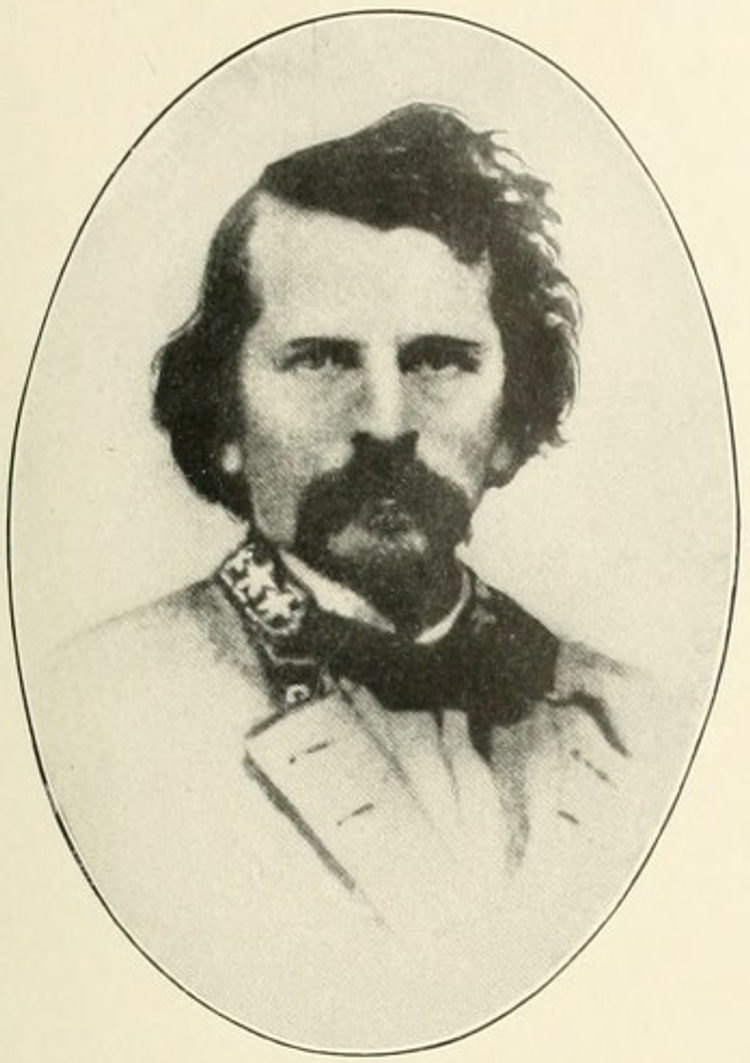
Confederate General Earl Van Dorn

The Van Dorn pattern battle flag.

Van Dorn was initially resistant to the idea of war between Americans and made efforts to prevent its outbreak. Despite his later support for the Confederacy, Van Dorn held onto the hope that the deepening national crisis could be resolved without bloodshed. His reluctance and efforts to prevent the conflict were marked by a certain naivety, as he underestimated the inevitability of the Civil War. This idealism led him to be somewhat delusional about the likelihood of war, as he clung to the belief that a peaceful resolution was still possible even as tensions escalated. As the Civil War began, Van Dorn enlisted in the Confederate States Army. He resigned from his U.S. Army commission, which was accepted effective January 31, 1861. He was appointed a brigadier general in the Mississippi Militia on January 23. In February, he replaced Jefferson Davis as major general and commander of Mississippi's state forces after Davis was selected as the Confederacy's President.

After resigning from the Mississippi Militia on March 16, 1861, Van Dorn entered the Regular Confederate States Army as a colonel of infantry on that same date. He was sent west to raise and lead a volunteer brigade within the new Confederate Department of Texas. On April 11, he was given command of Confederate forces in Texas and ordered to arrest and detain any U.S. troops in the state who refused to join the Confederate Army.

=== Van Dorn declared pirate by Lincoln ===
Leaving New Orleans on April 14 and arriving at Matagorda Bay, Texas, Van Dorn led his men in successfully capturing the Union supply ship, the Star of the West, on April 17, 1861 in the town's harbor. With the motivation of avoiding bloodshed on either side, he assumed command of the ship but allowed the Union troops to keep their firearms, citing that they were all Americans. This resulted in the first surrender of the war on April 17. For this, President Abraham Lincoln declared Van Dorn a pirate under the laws of the U.S. "for seizure of vessels or goods by persons acting under the authority of the Confederate States." He and his forces reached the last remaining regular U.S. Army soldiers in Texas at Indianola, forcing their surrender on April 23. While at Indianola, Van Dorn attempted to recruit the captured U.S. soldiers into the Confederate Army but was largely unsuccessful.

=== Promotion to divisional commander of the Confederate Army of the Potomac ===
Van Dorn was summoned to Richmond, Virginia, and appointed a colonel in the 1st C.S. Regular Cavalry on April 25, leading all of Virginia's cavalry forces. He was quickly promoted to brigadier general on June 5. After being promoted to major general on September 19, 1861, General Van Dorn was made divisional commander of the Confederate Army of the Potomac five days later, leading the 1st Division until January 10, 1862.

Around this time, Confederate President Davis needed a commander for the new Trans-Mississippi District, as two of the leading Confederate generals there, bitter rivals Sterling Price and Benjamin McCulloch, required a leader to subdue their strong personalities and organize an effective fighting force. Both Henry Heth and Braxton Bragg had turned down the post, and Davis selected Van Dorn. He headed west beginning on January 19 to concentrate his separated commands and set up his headquarters at Pocahontas, Arkansas. He assumed command of the district on January 29, 1862.

=== Pea Ridge ===
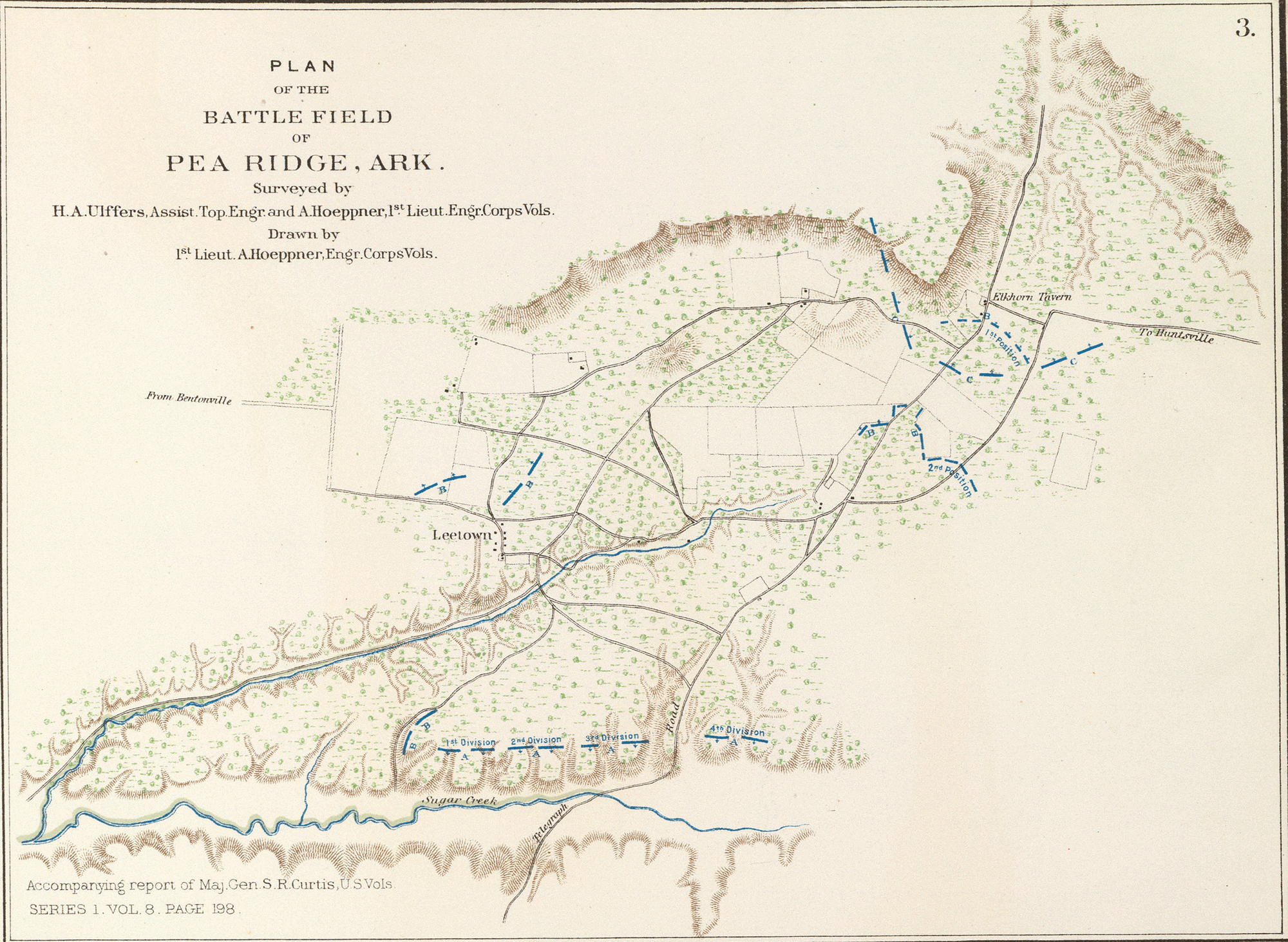
Plan of the battlefield of Pea Ridge

By early 1862, U.S. forces in Missouri had pushed nearly all Confederate forces out of the state. When Van Dorn took command of the department, he had to react with his roughly 17,000-man, 60-gun Army of the West to events already underway. Van Dorn wanted to attack and destroy the U.S. forces, enter Missouri, and capture St. Louis, turning over control of this important state to the Confederacy. He met his now-concentrated force near Boston Mountains on March 3, and the army began moving north the next day.

In the spring of 1862, U.S. Brig. Gen. Samuel R. Curtis entered Arkansas and pursued the Confederates with his 10,500-strong Army of the Southwest. Curtis collected his four divisions and 50 artillery guns and moved into Benton County, Arkansas, following a stream called Sugar Creek. Along it on the northern side, he found an excellent defensive position. He began to fortify it, expecting an assault from the south. Van Dorn chose not to attack Curtis's entrenched position head-on. Instead, he split his force into two, one division led by Price and the other by McCulloch, and ordered them to march north, hoping to reunite in Curtis' rear. Van Dorn left his supply wagons behind to increase their moving speed, which would prove critical.

Several other factors caused the proposed junction to be delayed, such as the lack of proper gear for the Confederates (some said to lack even shoes) for a forced march, felled trees placed across their path, their exhausted and hungry condition, and the late arrival of McCulloch's men. These delays allowed the U.S. commander to reposition part of his army throughout March 6 and meet the unexpected attack from his rear, placing Curtis' forces between the two wings of the Confederate army. When Van Dorn's advance guard accidentally ran into U.S. patrols near Elm Springs, the U.S. soldiers were alerted to his approach.

The Battle of Pea Ridge would be one of the few instances in the American Civil War where the Confederate forces outnumbered the U.S. forces. Just before taking command of the district, Van Dorn wrote to his wife Caroline, saying, "I am now in for it, to make a reputation and serve my country conspicuously or fail. I must not, shall not, do the latter. I must have St. Louis—then Huzza!"

After waiting for McCulloch to join him, Van Dorn grew frustrated and decided to act with what he had on March 7. Around 9 a.m., he ordered Price to attack the U.S. position close to Elkhorn Tavern. Despite Price being wounded, they had successfully pushed the U.S. forces back by nightfall, cutting Curtis' lines of communication. Meanwhile, under orders from Van Dorn to take a different route and hurry his march, McCulloch had engaged part of Curtis' defenses. Early on in the fighting, McCulloch and Brig. Gen. James M. McIntosh were killed, leaving no commander there to organize an effective attack.

When Van Dorn learned of the problems with his right wing, he renewed Price's attacks, saying, "Then we must press them the harder", and the Confederates pushed Curtis back. That night, the junction of Price and what remained of McCulloch's men was made, and Van Dorn pondered his next move. With his supplies and ammunition 15 miles (24 km) away and the U.S. forces between them, Van Dorn maintained his position.

The following day, March 8, showed Curtis and his command in an even stronger position, about a mile back from where they were on March 7. Van Dorn had his men arranged defensively in front of Pea Ridge Mountain. When it was light enough, he ordered the last of his artillery's ammunition fired at the U.S. position to see what the U.S. soldiers would do. The U.S. artillery answered, knocking out most of Van Dorn's guns. Curtis then counterattacked and routed the Confederates, mostly without actual contact between the opposing infantries. Van Dorn decided to withdraw south, retreating through the sparse country for a week and his men living off what little they got from the few inhabitants of the region. The Army of the West finally reunited with their supplies south of the Boston Mountains. In his official report, Van Dorn described his summary of the events at Pea Ridge:

I attempted first to beat the enemy at Elkhorn, but a series of accidents entirely unforeseen and not under my control and a badly-disciplined army defeated my intentions. The death of McCulloch and Mcintosh and the capture of Hebert left me without an officer to command the right wing, which was thrown into utter confusion, and the strong position of the enemy the second day left me no alternative but to retire from the contest.

Casualties from this battle have never been fully agreed upon. Most military historians give figures of about 1,000 to 1,200 total U.S. soldiers and around 2,000 Confederate.

However, Van Dorn detailed significantly different numbers in his official reports. He stated losses of about 800 killed with 1,000 to 1,200 wounded and 300 prisoners (about 2,300 total) for the United States, and only 800 to 1,000 killed and wounded and between 200 and 300 prisoners (about 1,300 total) from his army.

The Confederate defeat at this battle, coupled with Van Dorn's army being ordered across the Mississippi River to bolster the Army of the Tennessee, enabled the United States to regain control of the entire state of Missouri and threaten the heart of Arkansas, left virtually defenseless without Van Dorn's forces. Despite the loss at Pea Ridge, the Confederate Congress would vote its thanks "for their valor, skill, and good conduct in the battle of Elkhorn in the states of Arkansas" to Van Dorn and his men on April 21.

In his report on March 18 to Judah P. Benjamin, then the Confederate Secretary of War, Van Dorn refuted suffering a loss, saying, "I was not defeated, but only foiled in my intentions. I am yet sanguine of success, and will not cease to repeat my blows whenever the opportunity is offered."

=== Siege of Corinth ===
Following Pea Ridge, Van Dorn marched his troops east, with the intention of joining General Albert Sidney Johnston's Army of Mississippi, then consolidating at Corinth, Mississippi, in preparation to confront the Union Army's movement up the Tennessee River. Van Dorn's forces traversed Arkansas and crossed the Mississippi River, but were unable to reinforce Johnston due to adverse weather conditions causing significant fatigue, road obstacles impeded progress, and Bragg sought to engage Grant before the Battle of Shiloh ensued, and Johnston was killed in battle. However, Beauregard was informed that morning that Van Dorn remained in Memphis, making his arrival at the battlefield impractical.

Van Dorn's long-awaited Army of the West arrived at Corinth in mid-April, where it was integrated into the Army of Mississippi, now under General Pierre G.T. Beauregard, and comprised the right of the Confederate line during the Siege of Corinth.

=== Campaign near New Orleans ===
In August 1862, Van Dorn launched an expedition to recapture Baton Rouge, which had fallen to Union forces. The operation proved ill-fated, primarily because of inadequate planning and logistical challenges. During this engagement, the Confederate ironclad Arkansas was lost, reducing naval support for the Confederate campaign along the Mississippi and illustrating the vulnerability of Southern forces in combined operations against fortified Union positions.

Following the setback at Baton Rouge, on September 11, 1862, Confederate President Jefferson Davis issued an order for Van Dorn to proceed eastward from Vicksburg and unite with General Sterling Price's Army of the West, thereby concentrating Confederate forces in the region. Van Dorn was directed to assume command of these combined forces, which were formally redesignated as the Army of West Tennessee. The two forces successfully converged at Ripley, Mississippi, on September 28, 1862, thus forming a consolidated unit.

=== Second Corinth ===
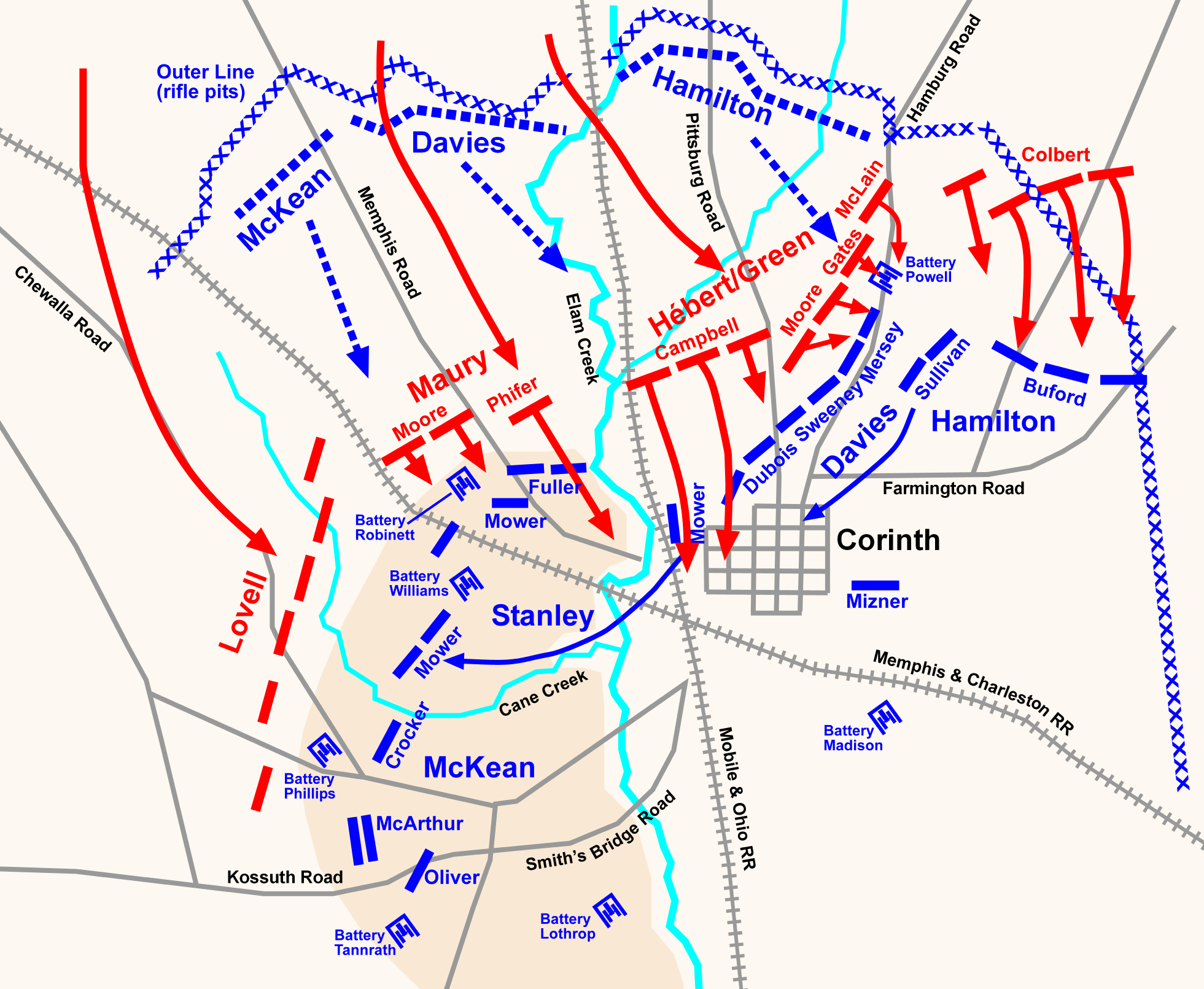
Second Battle of Corinth, actions on October 3–4, 1862

The performance of Van Dorn at the Second Battle of Corinth that autumn led to another U.S. victory. As at Pea Ridge, Van Dorn did well in the early stages of the battle on October 1–2, 1862, combining with Price's men and prudently placing his force that now was roughly equal in size to the U.S. army at about 22,000 soldiers. However, Van Dorn failed to reconnoiter the U.S. defenses, and his attack on Brig. Gen. William S. Rosecrans' strong defensive position at Corinth, Mississippi, on October 3, was bloodily repulsed.

On October 4–5, his command was "roughly handled" along the Hatchie River by U.S. soldiers led by Brig. Gens. Stephen A. Hurlbut and Edward Ord. However, Rosecrans' lack of an aggressive pursuit allowed what was left of Van Dorn's men to escape. Total casualties for the Second Battle of Corinth totaled 2,520 (355 killed, 1,841 wounded, 324 missing) for the U.S. Army and 4,233 (473 killed, 1,997 wounded, 1,763 captured/missing) for the Confederate Army.

After the battle, Van Dorn ordered a retreat, falling back through Abbeville, Oxford, and Water Valley, Mississippi, where he and his staff were nearly captured on December 4, then on to Coffeeville, Mississippi, constantly skirmishing with U.S. cavalry on December 4. Two days later, Van Dorn halted the retreat at Grenada. Following the defeat at Corinth, Van Dorn was sent before a court of inquiry to answer for his performance there. He was acquitted of the charges against him, but Van Dorn would never be trusted with the command of an army again and he was subsequently relieved of his district command.

The battle was later described by Confederate President Jefferson Davis as an "impossibility" due to many soldiers inherited by Van Dorn who were starving and diseased when he took over and Davis went on to say that Van Dorn handled such an impossibility "masterfully".

Eyewitness Captain H.E. Starke echoed Jefferson Davis in stating that this defeat was not the fault of Van Dorn and in a paper Starke wrote about the battle, he referred to Van Dorn as "the bravest of the brave, the knightly Earl Van Dorn." He went on to say, "If the true history of the attack on Corinth should be written, it would furnish a satisfactory excuse for the failure of Van Dorn in that memorable and desperately fought battle; our defeat must be attributed to the facts, that General Bragg saw fit to ignore the plans of Van Dorn, and to concentrate the army, for the purpose of engaging the enemy at Iuka. The result of that battle is well known; our force was reduced from 30,000 effective men to less than 17,000. But Van Dorn, with this small force, successfully stormed the works of this Gibraltar of Mississippi, defended by 35,000 men, composed of the flower of the entire Federal army, and commanded by their favorite general Grant. I say successfully, because in the face of the strongest and most formidable works, protected by the most powerful field-guns then in use, and supported by 35,000 bayonets, Van Dorn, with less than 17,000 men succeeded in capturing the works and driving its defenders back into the town, with great slaughter, where they were forced to take refuge in the houses. But this success was gained by the loss of nearly one-half of our number in killed and wounded, which weakened our army to such an extent that the largely reinforced enemy were enabled to repulse, and after a stubborn hand-to-hand fight drive us out of the fortifications. This battle ended the West Tennessee campaign, but did not end the brilliant exploits of Van Dorn."

== Strategic Deception and the Prevention of Bloodshed at Galveston ==
In late 1862, General Earl Van Dorn played a crucial role in the Confederate recapture of Galveston, Texas, demonstrating his strategic ingenuity and desire to minimize casualties. According to Arthur B. Carter's biography, "The Tarnished Cavalier: Major General Earl Van Dorn, C.S.A.," Van Dorn instructed Major General John B. Magruder in the use of deceptive tactics to overstate Confederate strength. These tactics included the strategic placement of troops and the use of "Quaker guns"—logs painted to resemble cannons—to create the illusion of a larger and more equipped force. Van Dorn also had a rider go to the Union side and invite a trusted advisor of the commanding officer, Colonel Isaac S. Burrell, to come to the Confederate lines to inspect their illusory strength with a promise of his safety in doing so. This psychological strategy successfully convinced the Union forces to surrender without significant bloodshed, highlighting Van Dorn's ability to achieve military objectives while preventing unnecessary loss of life.

== Return to cavalry command ==
=== Holly Springs Raid ===
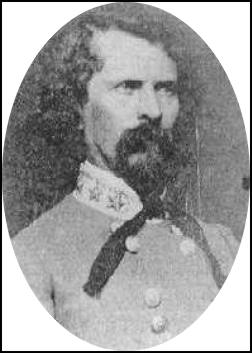
Earl Van Dorn in his Confederate general officer's uniform

General Van Dorn proved to be more effective and even brilliant as a cavalry commander, a role in which he was never beaten. He led the Holly Springs Raid, which thwarted Ulysses S. Grant's first Vicksburg Campaign plans. Van Dorn was upset at being relieved by General John C. Pemberton, and wanted to regain his honor. Obtaining Pemberton's permission, Van Dorn planned a secret raid against Grant, not even telling his soldiers. On December 16, 1862, Van Dorn, with 2,500 fighting cavalry left Grenada, fording the Yalobusha and riding northeast. At dawn on December 20, Van Dorn and his cavalry struck Holly Springs, capturing 1,500 U.S. soldiers while destroying at least $1,500,000 worth of U.S. supplies. U.S. post commander Colonel Robert C. Murphy was captured. Six hundred Illinois U.S. cavalry escaped. Local Confederate women at Holly Springs cheered Van Dorn as a celebrity conqueror, proclaiming "the Glorious Twentieth".

Grant had not been caught unaware of Van Dorn's raid but was, instead, outmaneuvered. Grant had placed his U.S. cavalry on a 24-hour watch to protect his supply line. U.S. cavalry commander T. Lyle Dickie had warned Grant that Van Dorn had left Grenada and was headed northeast. Grant had warned commanders of Van Dorn's raid by telegraph post to no avail. Colonel Murphy had been warned by Grant twice that Van Dorn was headed his way, but did nothing to prepare for battle. Grant's wife Julia and son Jesse were not in Holly Springs during Van Dorn's raid. They had left the night before to meet with Grant at Oxford.

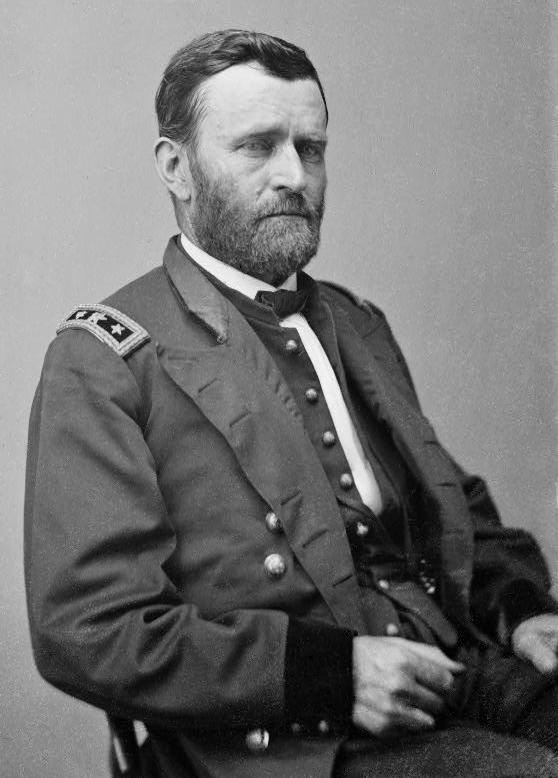
U.S. General Ulysses S. Grant

Van Dorn's raid directly coincided with Grant's General Order No. 11, issued by Grant less than 72 hours earlier, that expelled Jews as a class from Grant's military district. Grant had believed Jewish traders violated cotton trade regulations by the U.S. Treasury Department. Van Dorn's raid destroyed and disrupted U.S. communications lines. Additionally, Confederate General Bedford Forrest, on an earlier raid, starting December 10, had destroyed communication lines and fifty miles of the Mobile and Ohio Railroad behind Grant's front line. Van Dorn's cavalry raid delayed the implementation of Grant's General Order No. 11 for weeks, saving many Jews from potential expulsion.

After victory in Holly Springs, Van Dorn and his men then followed the Mobile and Ohio Railroad, fought unsuccessfully at Davis's Mills, skirmished near Middleburg, Tennessee, passed around Bolivar, and returned to their Grenada base by December 28. The successful raid helped Van Dorn regain his reputation that was lost at Second Corinth.

The attacks of both Van Dorn and Forrest caused Grant to withdraw his troops to Grand Junction, Tennessee, his U.S. army living off the countryside. With the telegraph lines destroyed by Van Dorn and Forrest, Grant could not communicate his withdrawal to Sherman, who was repulsed at Chickasaw Bluffs on December 29.

Although Grant was humiliated by devastating raids of both Van Dorn and Forrest, he was not fired, owing to Grant's previous victories at Fort Henry, Fort Donelson, Shiloh, Iuka, and Corinth. President Lincoln did, however, revoke Grant's controversial General Order No. 11. Grant was thwarted in his first attempt to capture Vicksburg, but after Van Dorn was murdered, he succeeded on his second attempt on July 4, 1863. He later incorporated the U.S. Cavalry as a separate fighting unit under U.S. General Phil Sheridan, during the Overland Campaign, in 1865.

=== Appointed cavalry commander ===
On January 13, 1863, Van Dorn was appointed to command all cavalry in the Department of Mississippi and East Louisiana. Then Gen. Joseph E. Johnston ordered him to join the Army of Tennessee, operating in Middle Tennessee. Van Dorn and his force left Tupelo, Mississippi, passed through Florence, and reached the army on February 20 at Columbia, Tennessee. Van Dorn set up his headquarters at Spring Hill at White Hall and assumed command of all of the surrounding cavalry. Army commander Gen. Braxton Bragg sent Van Dorn to protect and scout the left of the army, screening against U.S. cavalry.

=== Battle of Thompson's Station ===
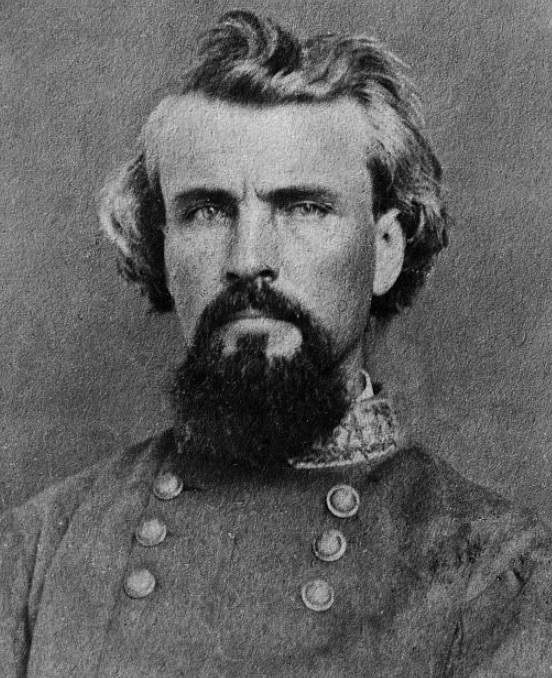
Confederate General Bedford Forrest

Van Dorn was also victorious at the Battle of Thompson's Station on March 5, 1863. There a Union brigade, under Col. John Coburn, left Franklin to reconnoiter to the south. About four miles short of Spring Hill, Coburn attacked a Confederate force composed of two regiments and was repulsed. Van Dorn then sent Brig. Gen. William Hicks Jackson's dismounted soldiers to make a direct frontal assault, while Brig. Gen. Nathan Bedford Forrest's troopers followed Van Dorn's orders and went around Coburn's left and into the Union rear. After three charges were beaten back, Jackson finally carried the U.S. position, as Forrest captured Coburn's wagon train, blocking the road to Columbia and the only escape route for Union soldiers. Nearly out of ammunition as well as surrounded, Coburn surrendered.

"Van Dorn [had] learned his lessons well from his bitter experiences at Pea Ridge and Corinth. With Sheridan not far away, he had wisely not divided his cavalry and had let the enemy come to him. His intelligence information was correct, as was his understanding of the terrain and road network where the action was fought. His plan of battle, based on the concept of drawing Coburn as far from Franklin as possible, was successful, thus making it all the more difficult for that officer to either escape or be reinforced. The Battle of Thompson's Station was important in that it prevented a union of Coburn's and Sheridan's forces and [it] marked Van Dorn as a promising and skillful leader of cavalry and mounted infantry. His popularity, already on the rise after the dark days of Corinth, was increased even more by the victory that March day in 1863. A mobile correspondent was soon to report the following, 'As Van Dorn rode along the column after the strife had ceased, cheer upon cheer greeted him from the enthusiastic soldiery, who under his daring direction had achieved the victory, and he is undoubtedly held high at the present moment in the estimation of his forces, and this confidence is well deserved.'"

==== First Battle of Franklin ====
On March 16, 1863, Van Dorn was placed in command of the cavalry corps of the Army of Tennessee and fought his last fight April 10 at the First Battle of Franklin, skirmishing with the cavalry of Gordon Granger and losing 137 men to Granger's 100 or so. This minor action caused Van Dorn to halt his movement and rethink his plans, and subsequently, he returned to the Spring Hill area. Forrest, commanding one of Van Dorn's cavalry brigades, criticized his judgment as a general, and an angered Van Dorn challenged Forrest to a duel. However, Forrest talked him out of it, reminding him of how important to the Confederacy they both were.

== Death ==
=== Alleged affair ===
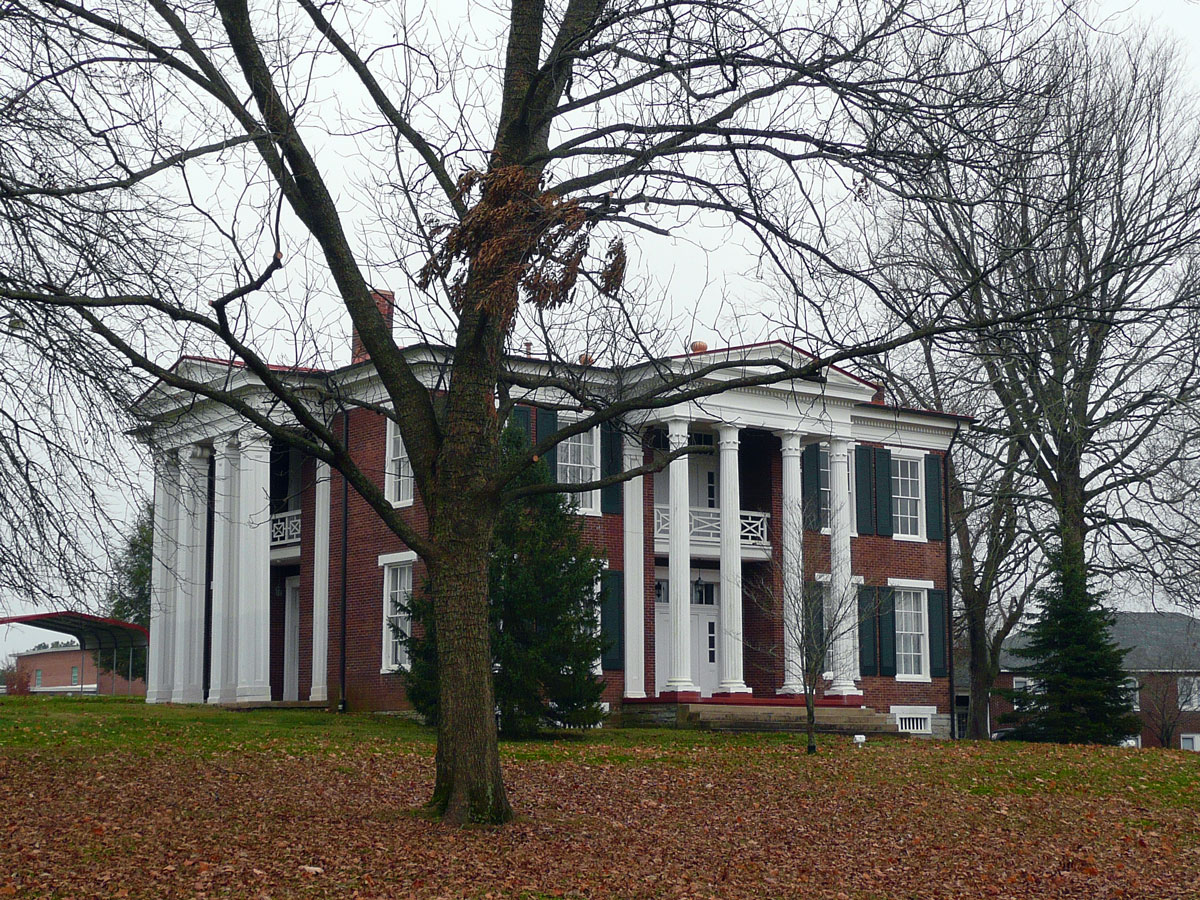
Martin Cheairs Mansion in Spring Hill, Tennessee, site of Van Dorn's shooting

Van Dorn's womanizing, rather than a military battle, led to his death. Van Dorn made his headquarters in the home of Martin Cheairs in Spring Hill, Tennessee. Ever the ladies' man, he attracted the attention of Jesse Helen Kissack Peters, the wife of a prominent local physician and state legislator, Dr. George B. Peters. Mrs. Peters, the fourth wife of Dr. Peters and nearly 25 years his junior, was described by locals as "bored" by her husband's long journeys away from home. Gossip quickly spread around town about Van Dorn's visits to Mrs. Peters' home and the couple's frequent unchaperoned carriage rides together.

When Dr. Peters returned home on April 12, he was mocked by local townsfolk for being a cuckold. Peters said he would shoot Van Dorn or any of his staff who set foot on his property. Eventually, the doctor hid outside his house one night and saw Van Dorn arrive. Peters rushed inside and found Van Dorn and his wife in a passionate embrace. He threatened to shoot Van Dorn on the spot, but the general pleaded for mercy if he would spare Mrs. Peters from any responsibility in the incident. Dr. Peters accepted this offer.

=== Homicide ===
A few weeks later, on the morning of May 7, Dr. Peters went to the Cheairs mansion. Van Dorn's security staff recognized him, as he frequently stopped to obtain passes through the Confederate lines, and let him inside. Peters walked into Van Dorn's office, where the general was writing at his desk, pulled out a pistol, and shot him in the back of the head. A few minutes later, the daughter of Martin Cheairs ran outside, saying that Peters had shot Van Dorn. The general's staff found him unconscious but still alive. The shot was fatal, and Van Dorn died four hours later, never having regained consciousness. Peters alleged that he had pulled a pistol aiming for Van Dorn's forehead but that Van Dorn moved at the last minute; however, the bullet wound was in the back, not the side, of Van Dorn's head.

The small caliber pistol round had traversed Van Dorn's brain and lodged behind his forehead. He suffered cerebral herniation and eventual cardiac and respiratory arrest. Those searching for Peters horse trail found that stone walls had been broken down all the ways to the woods. Peters was later arrested by Confederate authorities but was never brought to trial for the killing. In defense of his actions, Dr. Peters stated that Van Dorn had "violated the sanctity of his home." Condemnation of Van Dorn in the southern United States was widespread, as the code of honor ran strong in the region for certain behaviors. Confederate general St. John Liddell, a brigadier in the Army of Tennessee, said there was little sympathy to be had for Van Dorn. However, the claim of "little sympathy" was contradicted by eyewitness accounts of the funeral and letters to Van Dorn's family as recorded in A Soldier's Honor by Emily Miller, which suggest broad sorrow and sympathy from the majority.

=== Funeral ===
An eyewitness writes: "As we watched the immense procession of soldiers, the hearse drawn by six white horses, its gorgeous array of white and black plumes, that bore the grand casket in which the dead hero lay, we thought with sorrow of the handsome face still in death and the heart-broken wife thus cruelly widowed."

"Van Dorn's troopers would remember with fervent admiration his appearance as dawn arose on Dec. 20 and they waited with him just outside the town. 'Seated on his fine black mare, holding his hat above his head,' one recounted, 'I thought him as fine a figure as I had ever seen.' Colonel Griffith, whose plan Van Dorn had executed to perfection, wrote that 'I felt as if I could charge hell and capture the devil.'

Upon learning of Van Dorn's death, General W.H. Jackson, who served with Van Dorn in the Battle of Thompson's Station, wrote, "Upon the battle field, he was the personification of courage and chivalry. No knight of the olden time ever advanced to the contest more eagerly, and after the fury of the conflict had passed away, none was ever more generous and humane to the sufferers than he. As a commanding officer he was warmly beloved and highly respected; as a gentleman his social qualities were of the rarest order - for goodness of heart, he had no equal. His deeds have rendered his name worthy to be enrolled by the side of the proudest in the Capital of the Confederacy, and long will be sacredly and proudly cherished in the heards of his command."

=== Aftermath ===
Some conspiracy theories have been spoken about Van Dorn's death, including the possibility that Dr. Peters was motivated more by politics than the sanctity of his marriage. As a state legislator, Peters had earlier taken the oath of loyalty to the United States in Memphis, and although he divorced his wife soon after her affair was revealed, the couple reconciled years later and the federal government later returned Peters's land in Arkansas, which had been confiscated some time before the shooting of Van Dorn. Van Dorn's sister Emily later wrote a memoir defending her brother and blaming Peters' loyalty to the United States in the war as the real reason for shooting him.

General Van Dorn was one of the three major generals in the American Civil War who died violently from personal problems. The others were U.S. Major General William "Bull" Nelson, shot as the result of a feud with then Brigadier General Jefferson C. Davis in September 1862, and Confederate Major General John A. Wharton, shot as the result of an argument with Colonel George Wythe Baylor in April 1865.

Van Dorn's body was initially transported and buried in the graveyard of his wife's family in Alabama. At his sister's request, it was returned to Mississippi and reburied next to their father at Wintergreen Cemetery in their hometown of Port Gibson.

Van Dorn's childhood home, the Van Dorn House in Port Gibson, Mississippi, is listed on the National Register of Historic Places.

== Legacy ==
Controversial throughout his life, Van Dorn as a military commander was an exceptional leader of small to medium-sized groups of soldiers, particularly cavalry in which he was masterful, but was out of his element with infantry commands. Military historian David L. Bongard described him as "aggressive, brave, and energetic..." Military historian Richard P. Weinert summarized Van Dorn: "A brilliant cavalry officer, he was a disappointment in command of large combined forces."

According to the Mobile Register on the day of Van Dorn's death, "Gen. Van Dorn was every inch a soldier and just beginning to reap the reward of public confidence and praise. His loss will be severely felt in that branch of the service of which he was so complete a master."

If General Van Dorn chosen to consolidate his 16,000-man force into a singular, coordinated offensive, rather than dividing it into two distinct wings, a decisive breakthrough might have been achieved. Such a unified assault could have significantly influenced the outcome at Pea Ridge. Historians indicate that Van Dorn's failure to execute a single, concentrated blow was a pivotal factor in the Confederate defeat and the Union's subsequent consolidation of Missouri and northern Arkansas.

Historian Arthur Carter wrote of Van Dorn, "Van Dorn had a fearless and dashing nature, coupled with a love of danger throughout his life. During the prewar days in Texas, he had shown remarkable ability as a cavalry officer and Indian fighter. Later, his talent as a leader of mounted troops came to the forefront when he proved his true value to the Confederacy by leading the successful raid on Holly Springs, Mississippi, in December of 1862. His career was resurrected with his appointment as a cavalry commander at a time when the Confederate mounted arm was coming into its own in the West in 1862. By December of that year, Van Dorn appears to have matured as a soldier, giving the impression that he had learned to curb his impatience and recognize the value of intelligence and reconnaissance. This is evident in the action at Thompson's Station, Tennessee, the following March, when instead of dashing headlong into an attack on his adversary, he allowed the enemy to come to him. Van Dorn was controversial in life as well as in death. He had ardent supporters, particularly among the Texans, who, in the words of Lt. Col. Arthur Freemantle of the Coldstream Guards, considered Van Dorn to be the 'beau ideal' at the time of his death. In contrast, his detractors, such as Sen. Phelan of Mississippi, accused him of 'womanizing' and debauchery. Van Dorn's fatal weakness was his attraction to beautiful women, a weakness that would prove to be his undoing."

Some contemporary historians or commentators have suggested that Confederate General Earl Van Dorn, known for his aggressive cavalry tactics and personal pursuit of fame, might have been more suitably killed on the battlefield during the Vicksburg campaigns rather than at his headquarters in Spring Hill, Tennessee.

Military historian and biographer John C. Fredriksen described him as "a brave and capable soldier, but he proved somewhat lacking in administrative ability." Fredriksen said that Van Dorn belonged in cavalry command, where he was "back in his element" and "demonstrated flashes of brilliance" with that branch of the service. Fredriksen believed Van Dorn's successes at Holly Springs and Thompson's Station in the spring of 1863 proved he was one of the leading cavalry leaders in the Confederacy. He said that his death cost the Confederacy a "useful leader at a critical juncture of the Vicksburg campaign", noting that Van Dorn was the senior major general in the Confederate States Army when he was killed. Physically short, impulsive, and highly emotional, Van Dorn was also a noted painter and writer of poetry. He was respected for his horsemanship and was known as a lover of women. A reporter dubbed him "the terror of ugly husbands" shortly before Van Dorn was killed.

It is written that "Van Dorn had ample opportunity to participate in the social life of the community. Handsome, debonair, and polished, he presented a dashing figure in Confederate gray, so it was not surprising that he was a major attraction and the center of attention at public and private events."

In 2026, a historical romance film titled The Legend of Van Dorn was released, dramatizing the final chapter of General Van Dorn’s life. Directed by Shane Stanley and written by Lee Wilson, who also portrays Van Dorn, the film was featured at the Cannes Film Festival. It depicts Van Dorn’s military accomplishments, personal relationships, and his assassination in Spring Hill, Tennessee.

== Honors ==
- CSS General Earl Van Dorn, a side-wheel river steamer in the Confederate States Navy, was named for him in early 1862. After destroying most of the River Defense Fleet in U.S. battles, this steamer was burned in June 1862 to prevent its capture by U.S. forces.
- In 1906, the Daughters of the Confederacy of Claiborne County erected a monument to Confederate soldiers in front of the county courthouse in Port Gibson. It is topped by a portrait statue of Van Dorn.
- In 1942, the U.S. Army established Camp Van Dorn, a training camp near Centreville, Mississippi, in Wilkinson and Amite counties for troops during World War II, naming it in his memory. It operated until 1946.

== See also ==
- List of American Civil War generals (Confederate)
- John Donelson § Descendants
