= National Register of Historic Places listings in Marion County, Mississippi =

Location of Marion County in Mississippi

This is a list of the National Register of Historic Places listings in Marion County, Mississippi.

This is intended to be a complete list of the properties and districts on the National Register of Historic Places in Marion County, Mississippi, United States. Latitude and longitude coordinates are provided for many National Register properties and districts; these locations may be seen together in a map.

There are 10 properties and districts listed on the National Register in the county.

This National Park Service list is complete through NPS recent listings posted March 14, 2025.

== Current listings ==
	Name on the Register	Image	Date listed	Location	City or town	Description
1	Broad Street-Church Street Historic District	Broad Street-Church Street Historic District	July 8, 2008 (#08000672)	Roughly bounded by High School St. on the west and Pine Ave. on the east along Sumrall Rd. and Broad St. 31°15′16″N 89°49′23″W	Columbia	
2	Columbia Country Club		January 14, 2015 (#14001156)	28 Golf Course Rd. 31°15′57″N 89°49′52″W	Columbia	
3	Columbia North Historic District	Columbia North Historic District	August 20, 2009 (#09000625)	Roughly bounded by High School and N. Main Sts. on the west and Park and Branton Aves. on the east 31°15′15″N 89°49′46″W	Columbia	
4	Downtown Columbia Historic District		June 27, 1997 (#97000633)	Roughly bounded by Broad and Church Sts. and Meak, Honey, and Beef Alleys; also 704 and 706 Honey Alley; 31°15′07″N 89°50′06″W	Columbia	704/706 Honey Alley represents a boundary increase of September 9, 1998
5	Ford House	Ford House	June 21, 1971 (#71000457)	South of Sandy Hook on Old Columbia-Covington Rd. 31°00′44″N 89°47′11″W	Sandy Hook	
6	Keys Hill Historic District	Keys Hill Historic District	June 14, 1982 (#82004836)	Broad St. 31°15′06″N 89°48′55″W	Columbia	
7	Lampton-Thompson-Bourne House	Lampton-Thompson-Bourne House	November 5, 1998 (#98001335)	423 Church St. 31°15′13″N 89°49′51″W	Columbia	
8	Marion County Courthouse and Jail	Marion County Courthouse and Jail	March 3, 1995 (#95000178)	Courthouse Square; 31°15′02″N 89°50′06″W	Columbia	
9	Superintendent's Home at Columbia Training School	Superintendent's Home at Columbia Training School	July 14, 1995 (#95000787)	1730 Mississippi Highway 44; 31°15′56″N 89°48′02″W	Columbia	
10	U.S. Post Office	U.S. Post Office	April 7, 1981 (#81000329)	815 Main St. 31°15′15″N 89°50′08″W	Columbia	

== See also ==
- List of National Historic Landmarks in Mississippi
- National Register of Historic Places listings in Mississippi
