= National Register of Historic Places listings in Sunflower County, Mississippi =

Location of Sunflower County in Mississippi

This is a list of the National Register of Historic Places listings in Sunflower County, Mississippi.

This is intended to be a complete list of the properties and districts on the National Register of Historic Places in Sunflower County, Mississippi, United States. Latitude and longitude coordinates are provided for many National Register properties and districts; these locations may be seen together in a map.

There are 5 properties and districts listed on the National Register in the county.

This National Park Service list is complete through NPS recent listings posted March 14, 2025.

== Current listings ==
| | Name on the Register | Image | Date listed | Location | City or town | Description |
|---|---|---|---|---|---|---|
| 1 | Dockery Farms Historic District | Dockery Farms Historic District | March 31, 2006 (#06000250) | Mississippi Highway 8, E. 33°43′44″N 90°36′46″W | Dockery | |
| 2 | Heathman Plantation Commissary | Heathman Plantation Commissary | November 14, 2012 (#12000923) | Heathman Rd. 33°26′26″N 90°43′07″W | Indianola vicinity | |
| 3 | Indianola Historic District | Indianola Historic District | November 30, 2009 (#09000356) | Roughly bounded by Percy St. on the north, Front to Adair on the west to Roosevelt, Roosevelt east to Front Extended and north 33°27′02″N 90°39′06″W | Indianola | |
| 4 | Ruleville Depot | Ruleville Depot | July 15, 1999 (#99000841) | Eastern side of the railroad tracks at the junction of East Floyce Street and North Front Street; 33°43′38″N 90°33′09″W | Ruleville | Constructed 1930, closed as railroad depot 1978 |
| 5 | Woodburn Bridge | Woodburn Bridge | November 16, 1988 (#88002492) | Spans the Big Sunflower River on a county road southeast of Indianola; 33°23′15″N 90°42′21″W | Indianola | Constructed c. 1916, abandoned c. 1985 |

== See also ==
- List of National Historic Landmarks in Mississippi
- National Register of Historic Places listings in Mississippi
