= National Register of Historic Places listings in Scott County, Mississippi =

Location of Scott County in Mississippi

This is a list of the National Register of Historic Places listings in Scott County, Mississippi.

This is intended to be a complete list of the properties and districts on the National Register of Historic Places in Scott County, Mississippi, United States. Latitude and longitude coordinates are provided for many National Register properties and districts; these locations may be seen together on a map.

There are 6 properties and districts listed on the National Register in the county.

This National Park Service list is complete through NPS recent listings posted April 24, 2026.

== Current listings ==
	Name on the Register	Image	Date listed	Location	City or town	Description
1	Forest Downtown Historic District		January 15, 2014 (#13001083)	Roughly bounded by RR tracks, Front, 3rd, Raleigh & Smith Sts. 32°21′46″N 89°28′27″W	Forest	
2	Hillsboro Methodist Church and Cemetery		June 5, 2017 (#100001030)	Old Highway 35 N. 32°27′16″N 89°30′47″W	Hillsboro	
3	Lake Railroad Station	Lake Railroad Station	July 19, 1984 (#84002346)	Brook St. 32°20′35″N 89°19′42″W	Lake	
4	Moore Lookout Tower		October 28, 1999 (#99001283)	County Road 503; 32°19′07″N 89°29′49″W	Forest	
5	Roosevelt State Park	Roosevelt State Park	December 1, 1997 (#97001436)	2149 Mississippi Highway 13, S. 32°18′49″N 89°40′45″W	Morton	
6	US Post Office-Forest	US Post Office-Forest	March 18, 1993 (#80004884)	313 E. 2nd St. 32°21′46″N 89°28′22″W	Forest	

== See also ==
- List of National Historic Landmarks in Mississippi
- National Register of Historic Places listings in Mississippi
