= National Register of Historic Places listings in Greene County, Mississippi =

Location of Greene County in Mississippi

This is a list of the National Register of Historic Places listings in Greene County, Mississippi.

This is intended to be a complete list of the properties and districts on the National Register of Historic Places in Greene County, Mississippi, United States. Latitude and longitude coordinates are provided for many National Register properties and districts; these locations may be seen together in a map.

There are 2 properties and districts listed on the National Register in the county.

This National Park Service list is complete through NPS recent listings posted September 26, 2025.

== Current listings ==
	Name on the Register	Image	Date listed	Location	City or town	Description
1	Leaf River Bridge	Leaf River Bridge	November 16, 1988 (#88002478)	Spans the Leaf River north of McLain on a county road 31°07′39″N 88°49′01″W	McLain	Constructed in 1907
2	Vernal Presbyterian Church	Vernal Presbyterian Church	November 18, 2002 (#02001389)	455 McInnis-Vernal Road; 31°02′04″N 88°36′42″W	Lucedale	Constructed 1906 to 1908

== See also ==
- List of National Historic Landmarks in Mississippi
- National Register of Historic Places listings in Mississippi
