= National Register of Historic Places listings in Union County, Mississippi =

Location of Union County in Mississippi

This is a list of the National Register of Historic Places listings in Union County, Mississippi.

This is intended to be a complete list of the properties and districts on the National Register of Historic Places in Union County, Mississippi, United States. Latitude and longitude coordinates are provided for many National Register properties and districts; these locations may be seen together in a map.

There are 5 properties and districts listed on the National Register in the county.

This National Park Service list is complete through NPS recent listings posted March 14, 2025.

== Current listings ==
	Name on the Register	Image	Date listed	Location	City or town	Description
1	B.F. Ford School		June 17, 2022 (#100007845)	507 Oak St. 34°29′03″N 89°00′24″W	New Albany	
2	Ingomar Mound	Ingomar Mound	June 9, 1978 (#78001632)	Address restricted	Ingomar	
3	New Albany Downtown Historic District	New Albany Downtown Historic District	November 1, 1996 (#96001266)	Roughly bounded by W. and E. Main, Camp St., and the former St. Louis – San Francisco railroad tracks 34°29′38″N 89°00′31″W	New Albany	
4	New Albany Historic District		August 30, 2024 (#100010772)	Roughly bounded to the north by properties fronting the north side of Mississippi Street; to the east 1 by properties fronting the east side of North and Garfield Streets; to the south by Standish Street and properties fronting the south side of Ford Street; 34°29′48″N 89°00′06″W	New Albany	
5	Union County Courthouse	Union County Courthouse	August 10, 1990 (#90001222)	Bankhead St. between Court and Camp Aves. 34°29′33″N 89°00′26″W	New Albany	

== See also ==
- List of National Historic Landmarks in Mississippi
- National Register of Historic Places listings in Mississippi
