= National Register of Historic Places listings in Wayne County, Mississippi =

Location of Wayne County in Mississippi

This is a list of the National Register of Historic Places listings in Wayne County, Mississippi.

This is intended to be a complete list of the properties and districts on the National Register of Historic Places in Wayne County, Mississippi, United States. Latitude and longitude coordinates are provided for many National Register properties and districts; these locations may be seen together in a map.

There are 2 properties and districts listed on the National Register in the county. Another property was once listed but has been removed.

This National Park Service list is complete through NPS recent listings posted August 8, 2025.

== Current listings ==
	Name on the Register	Image	Date listed	Location	City or town	Description
1	Downtown Waynesboro Historic District	Downtown Waynesboro Historic District	March 26, 2012 (#12000157)	Roughly bounded by Station, Spring, Wayne, & Court Sts. 31°40′32″N 88°38′43″W	Waynesboro	
2	Yellow Creek Bridge	Yellow Creek Bridge	November 16, 1988 (#88002493)	Spans Yellow Creek on a county road northwest of Waynesboro; 31°41′49″N 88°40′13″W	Waynesboro vicinity	

=== Former listing ===
	Name on the Register	Image	Date listed	Date removed	Location	City or town	Description
1	Waynesboro Bridge		November 16, 1988 (#88002494)	April 7, 2004	Spanned Chickasawhay River on Old US 84; 31°41′44″N 88°40′11″W	Waynesboro vicinity	Collapsed November 2, 2002

== See also ==
- List of National Historic Landmarks in Mississippi
- National Register of Historic Places listings in Mississippi
