= National Register of Historic Places listings in Lamar County, Mississippi =

Location of Lamar County in Mississippi

This is a list of the National Register of Historic Places listings in Lamar County, Mississippi.

This is intended to be a complete list of the properties and districts on the National Register of Historic Places in Lamar County, Mississippi, United States. Latitude and longitude coordinates are provided for many National Register properties and districts; these locations may be seen together in a map.

There are 2 properties and districts listed on the National Register in the county.

This National Park Service list is complete through NPS recent listings posted March 14, 2025.

== Current listings ==
	Name on the Register	Image	Date listed	Location	City or town	Description
1	Old Municipal Courtroom and Jail	Old Municipal Courtroom and Jail	April 14, 2000 (#00000379)	405 Pine Street at Railroad Avenue; 31°24′56″N 89°32′40″W	Sumrall	Constructed in 1907
2	U.S. Post Office	U.S. Post Office	April 7, 1981 (#81000328)	104 Heber Ladner Drive; 31°00′01″N 89°27′11″W	Lumberton	Constructed 1931-32

== See also ==
- List of National Historic Landmarks in Mississippi
- National Register of Historic Places listings in Mississippi
