= National Register of Historic Places listings in Issaquena County, Mississippi =

Location of Issaquena County in Mississippi

This is a list of the National Register of Historic Places listings in Issaquena County, Mississippi.

This is intended to be a complete list of the properties and districts on the National Register of Historic Places in Issaquena County, Mississippi, United States. Latitude and longitude coordinates are provided for many National Register properties and districts; these locations may be seen together in a map.

There are 5 properties and districts listed on the National Register in the county.

This National Park Service list is complete through NPS recent listings posted October 23, 2026.

== Current listings ==
	Name on the Register	Image	Date listed	Location	City or town	Description
1	Aden Site (22Is509;22M3)	Aden Site (22Is509;22M3)	December 14, 1988 (#88002698)	Address restricted	Valley Park	
2	Unita Blackwell House		March 9, 2022 (#100007426)	139 Rosebud St. 32°54′03″N 91°03′07″W	Mayersville	
3	Grace Archeological Site	Grace Archeological Site	March 21, 2002 (#02000206)	Address restricted	Grace	
4	Mayersville Archeological Site	Mayersville Archeological Site	April 29, 1980 (#80002250)	Address restricted	Mayersville	
5	Railroad Section Foreman's House		December 30, 1999 (#99001615)	No. 3 Railroad Road; 32°38′10″N 90°51′54″W	Valley Park	Constructed c. 1882

== See also ==
- List of National Historic Landmarks in Mississippi
- National Register of Historic Places listings in Mississippi
