= National Register of Historic Places listings in Mississippi =

There are more than 1,400 properties and districts in Mississippi that are listed on the United States National Register of Historic Places, distributed among all of the state's 82 counties.

The locations of National Register properties and districts (at least for all showing latitude and longitude coordinates below), may be seen in an online map by clicking on "Map of all coordinates".

This National Park Service list is complete through NPS recent listings posted November 6, 2026.

== Listings by county ==
The following are approximate tallies of current listings by county. These counts are based on entries in the National Register Information Database as of March 13, 2009 and new weekly listings posted since then on the National Register of Historic Places web site. There are frequent additions to the listings and occasional delistings and the counts here are approximate and not official. New entries are added to the official Register on a weekly basis. Also, the counts in this table exclude boundary increase and decrease listings which modify the area covered by an existing property or district and which carry a separate National Register reference number.

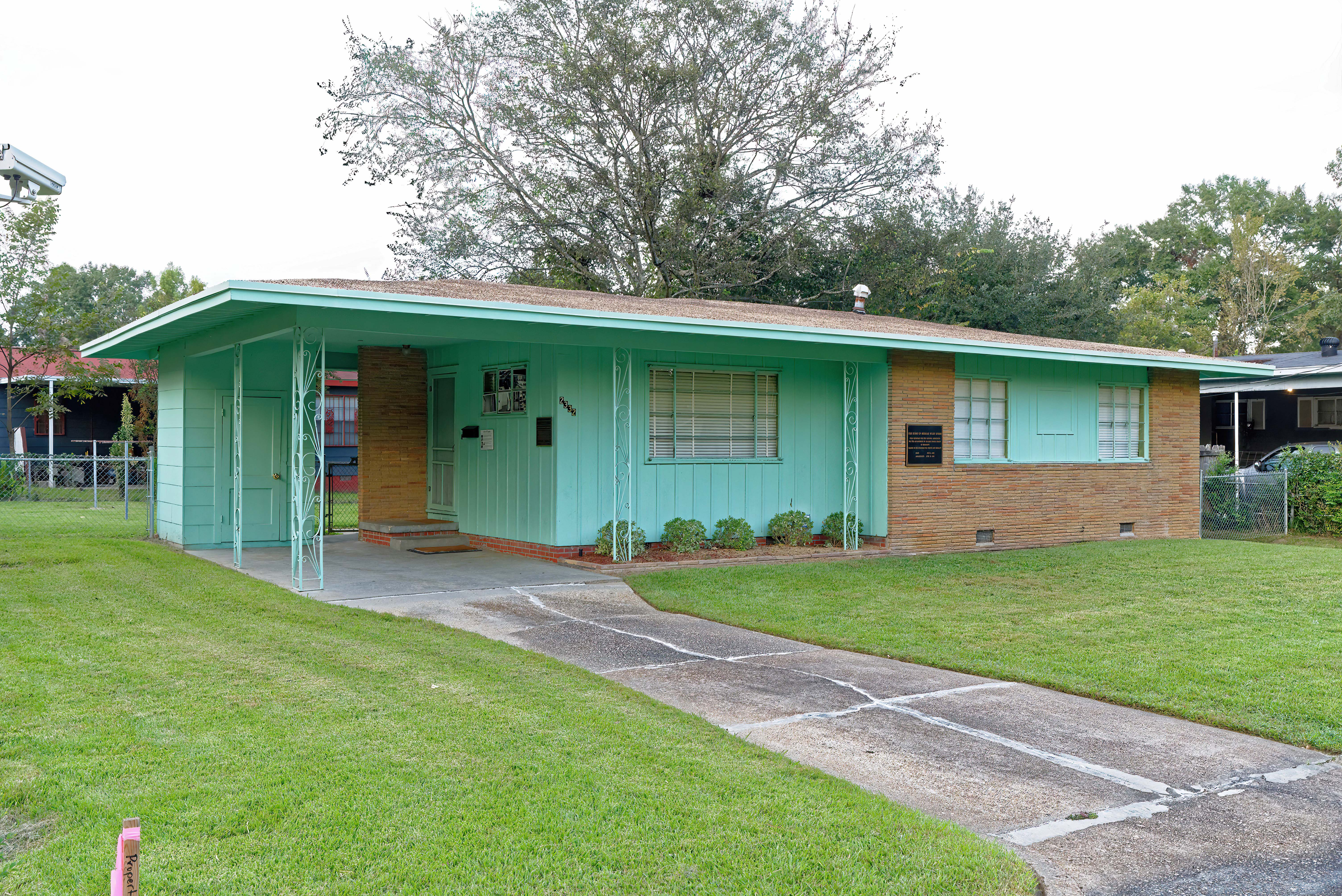
Medgar and Myrlie Evers Home National Monument in Hinds County

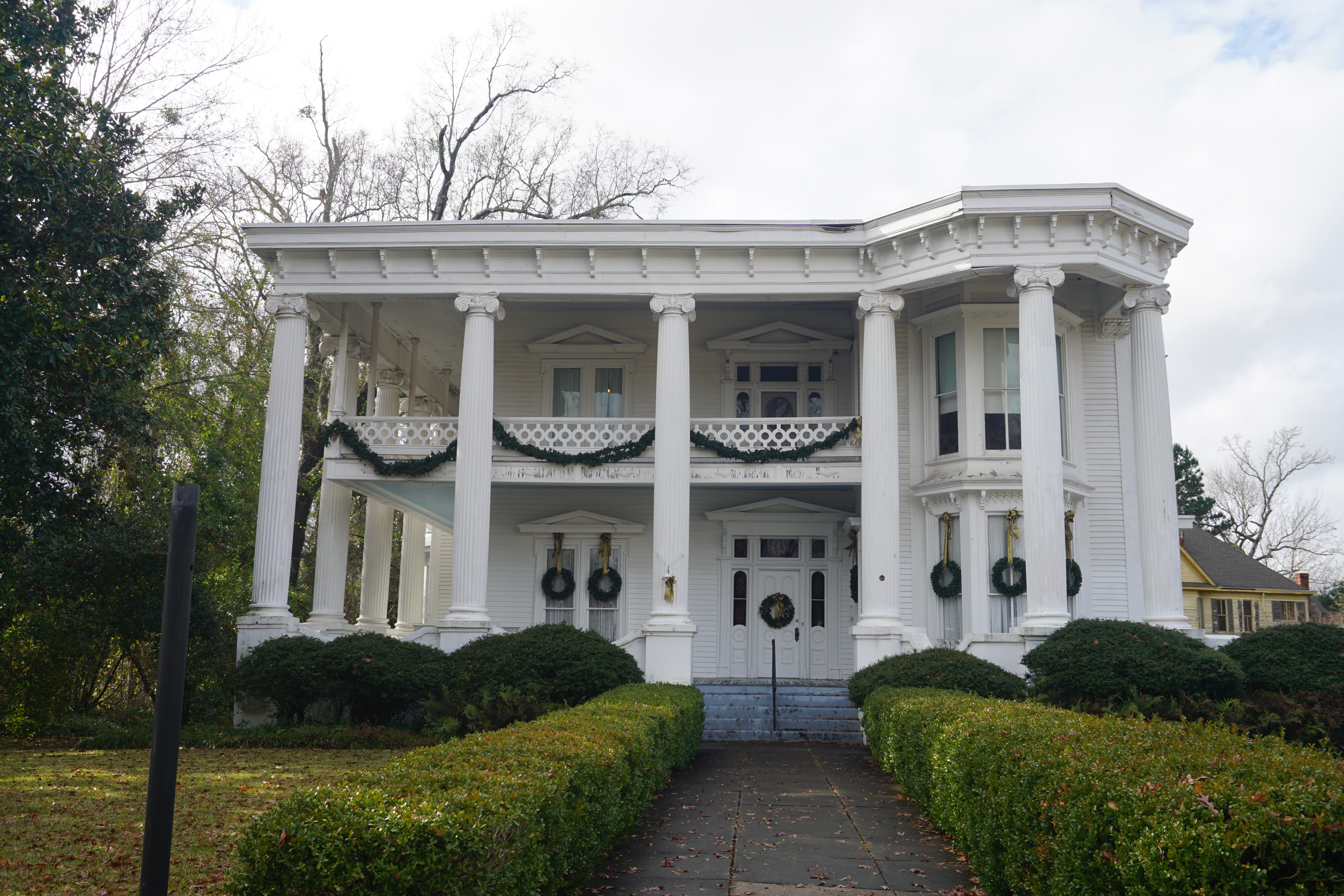
Merrehope in Meridian

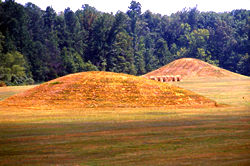
Pharr Mounds in Ittawamba County

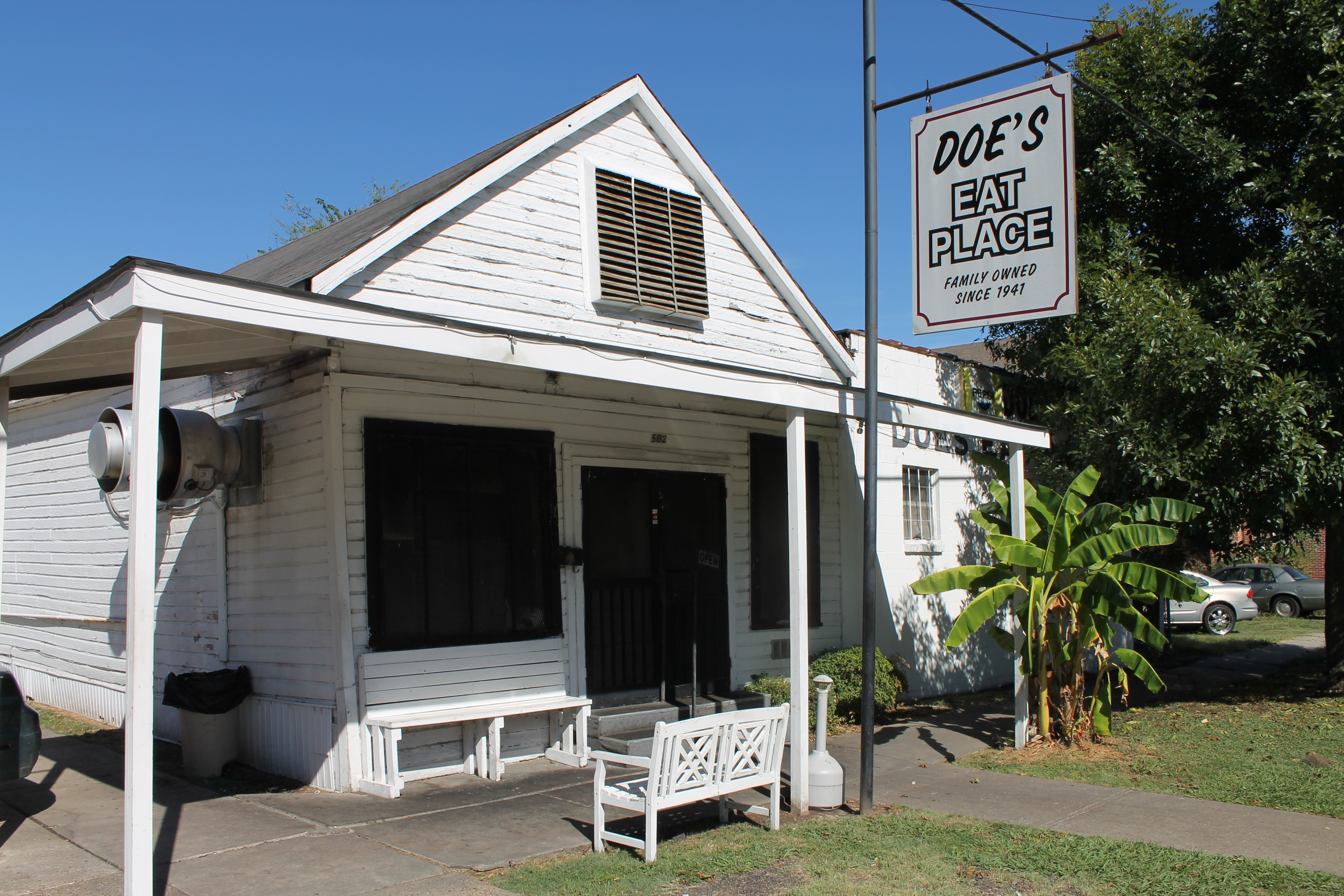
Doe's Eat Place in Washington County

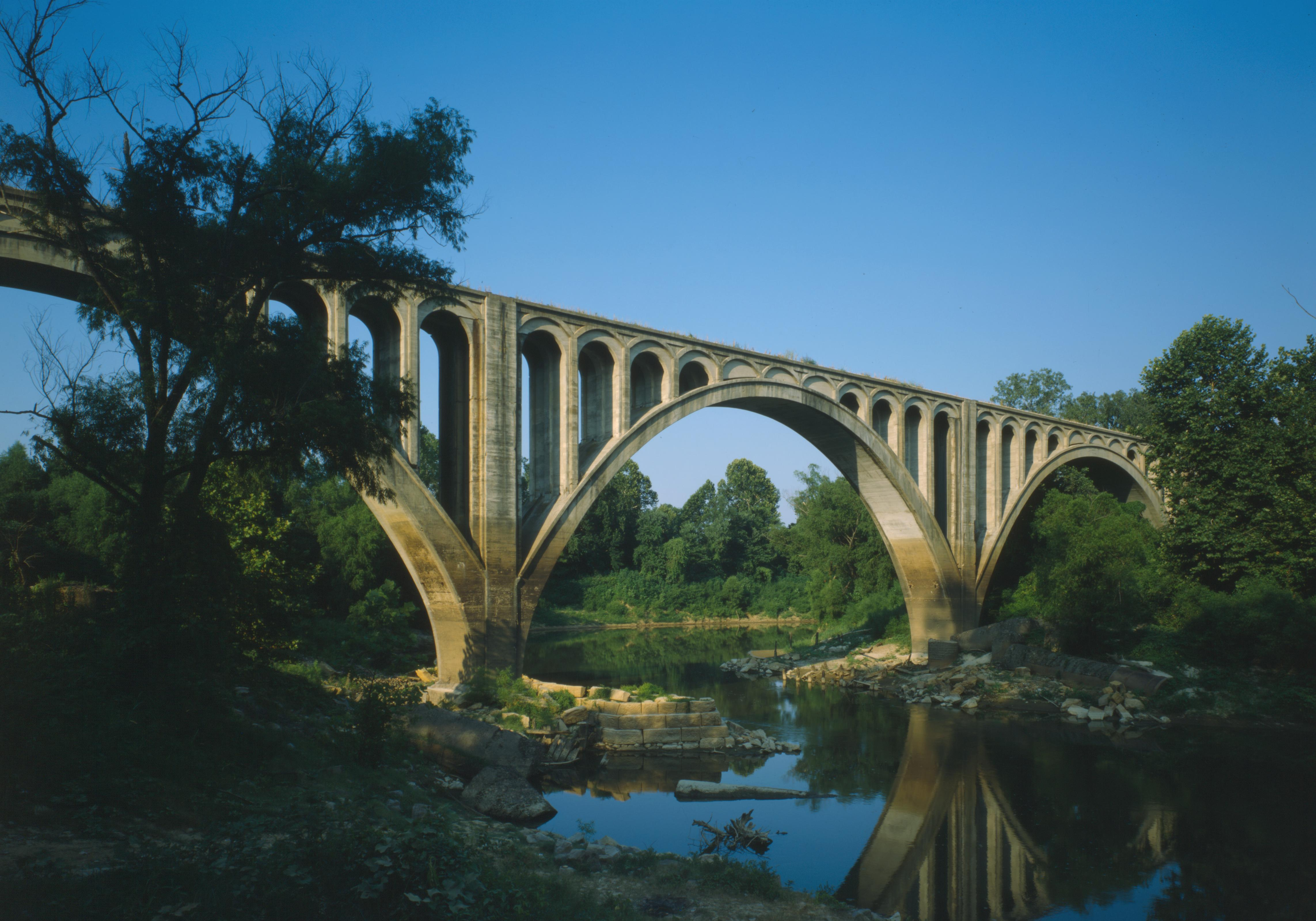
Big Black River Railroad Bridge in Hinds County.

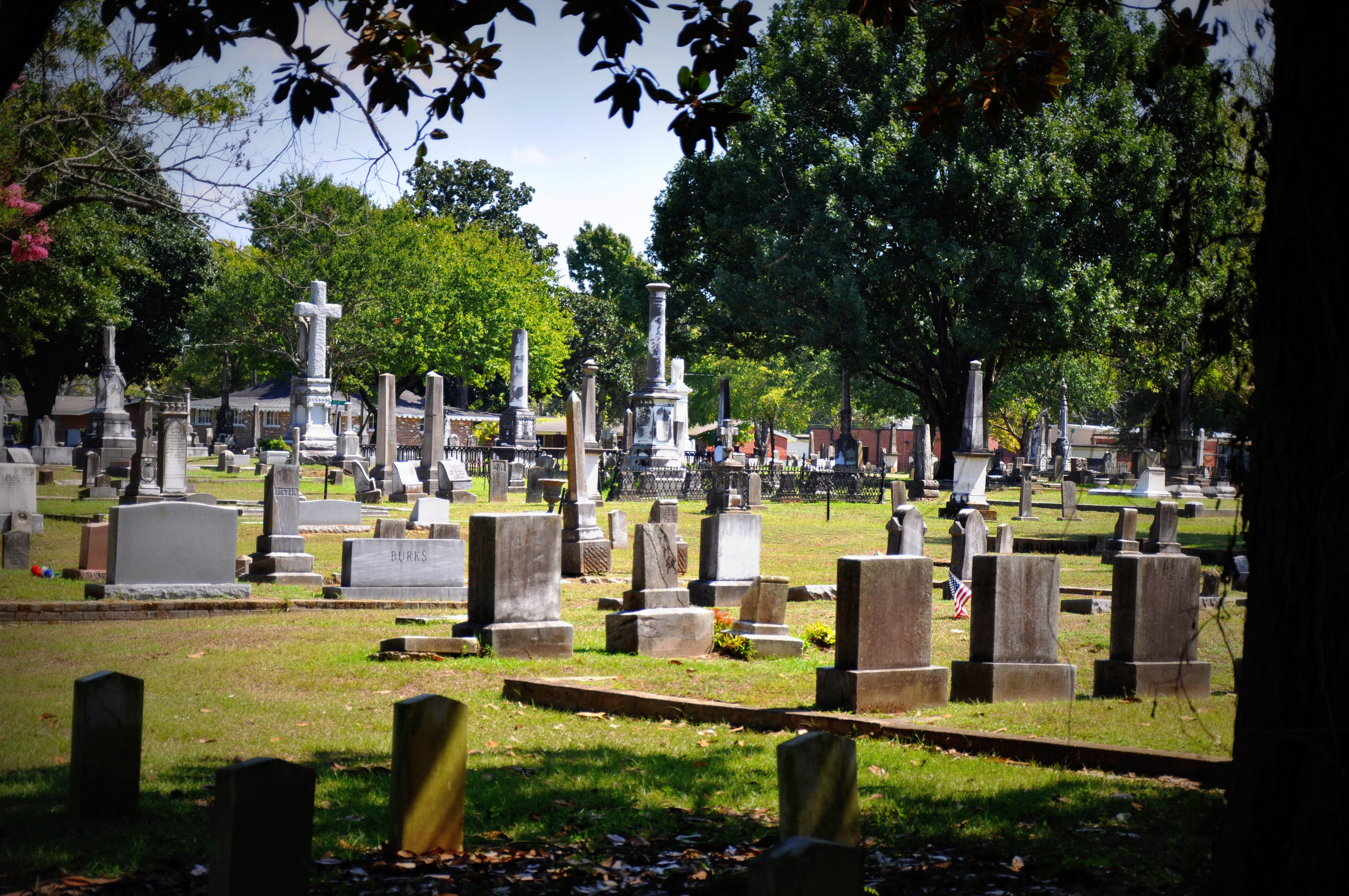
Friendship Cemetery in Lowndes County

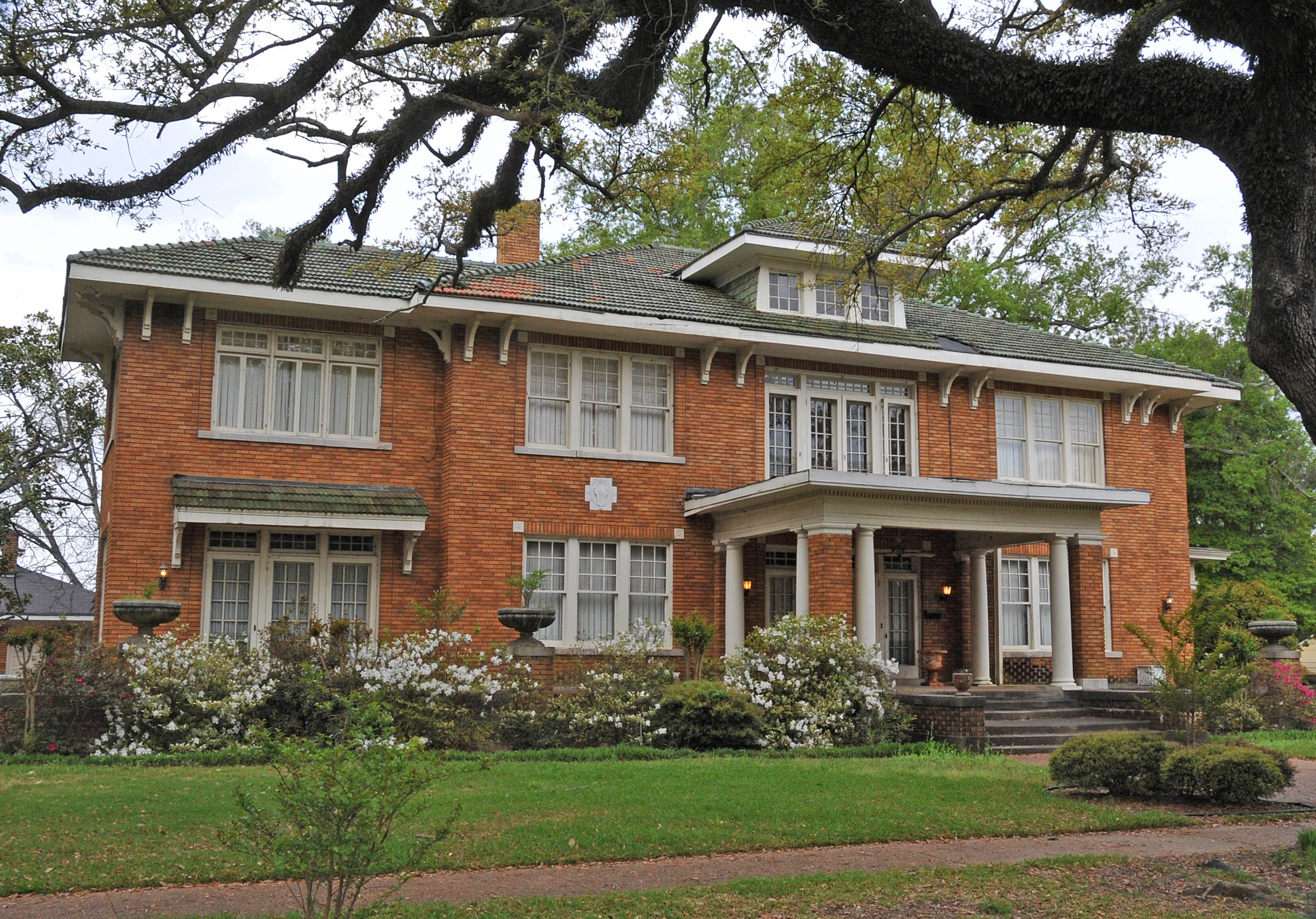
Southworth House in Leflore County

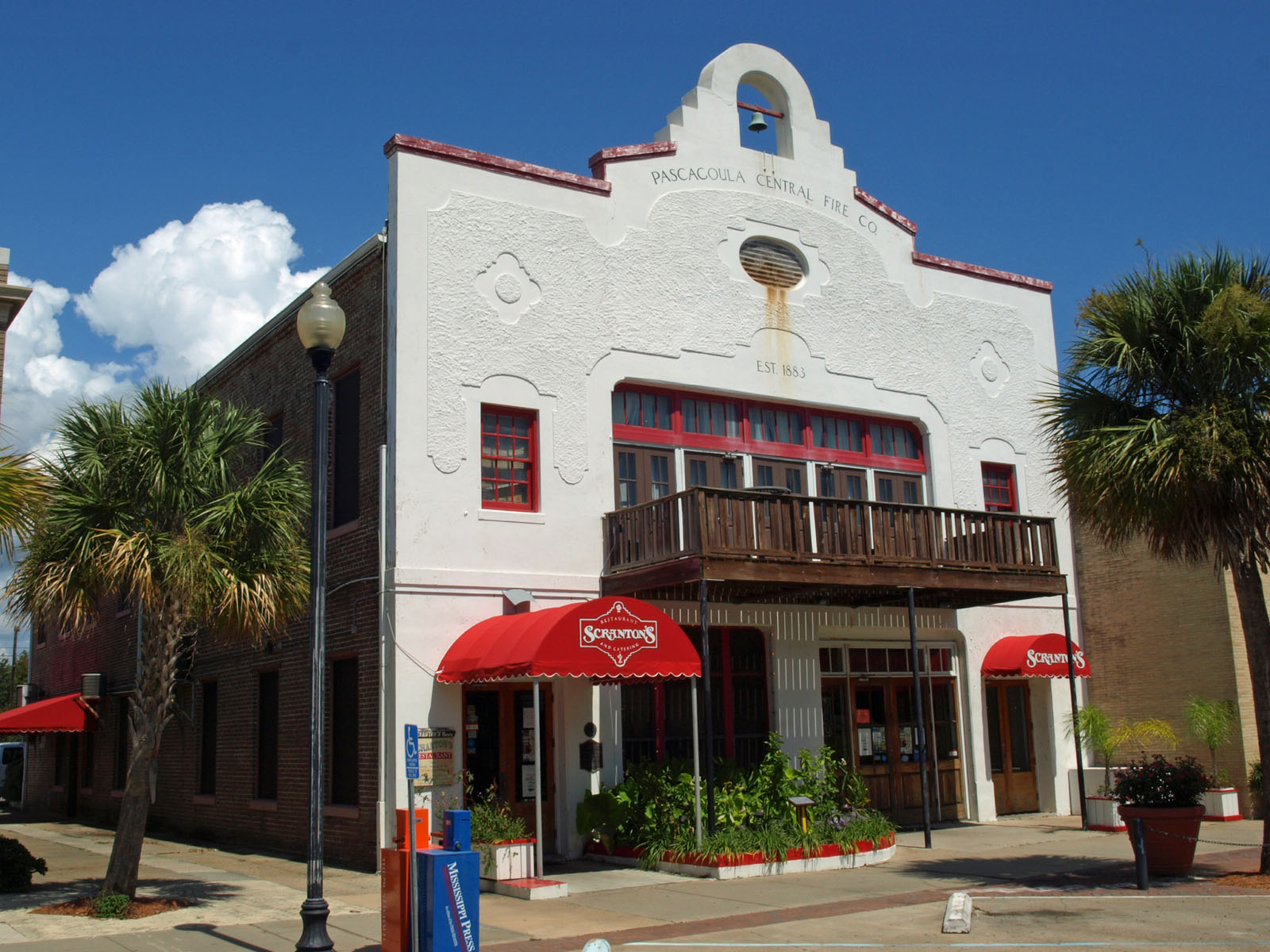
Pascagoula Central Fire Station No. 1 in Jackson County

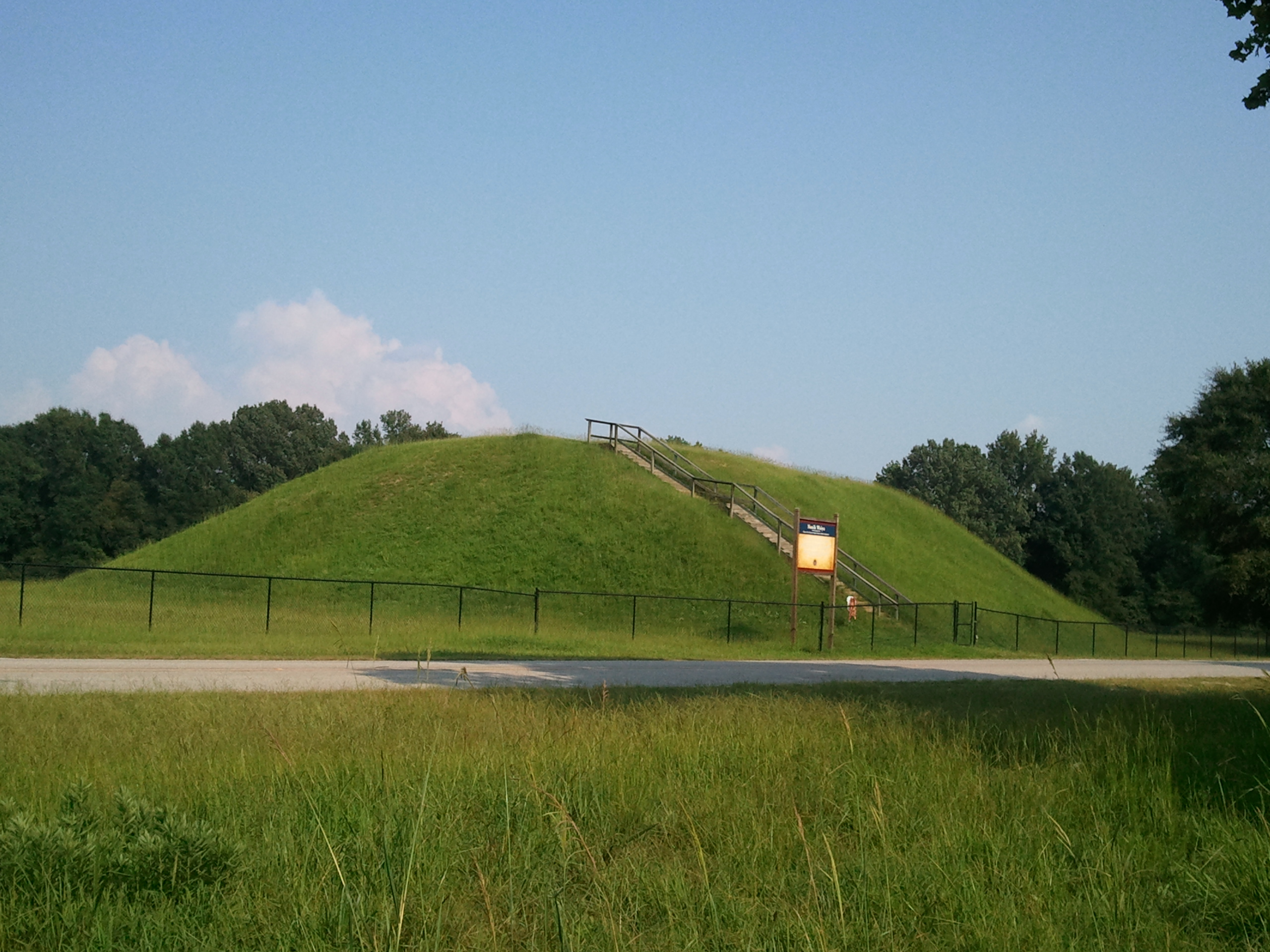
Nanih Waiya in Neshoba County

	County	# of Sites
1	Adams	125
2	Alcorn	22
3	Amite	19
4	Attala	20
5	Benton	2
6	Bolivar	16
7	Calhoun	2
8	Carroll	13
9	Chickasaw	10
10	Choctaw	6
11	Claiborne	36
12	Clarke	51
13	Clay	29
14	Coahoma	23
15	Copiah	35
16	Covington	3
17	DeSoto	13
18	Forrest	20
19	Franklin	5
20	George	1
21	Greene	2
22	Grenada	16
23	Hancock	19
24	Harrison	55
25	Hinds	129
26	Holmes	17
27	Humphreys	6
28	Issaquena	5
29	Itawamba	1
30	Jackson	69
31	Jasper	5
32	Jefferson	26
33	Jefferson Davis	5
34	Jones	13
35	Kemper	6
36	Lafayette	17
37	Lamar	2
38	Lauderdale	46
39	Lawrence	31
40	Leake	5
41	Lee	28
42	Leflore	39
43	Lincoln	17
44	Lowndes	34
45	Madison	31
46	Marion	10
47	Marshall	22
48	Monroe	37
49	Montgomery	8
50	Neshoba	7
51	Newton	7
52	Noxubee	13
53	Oktibbeha	25
54	Panola	30
55	Pearl River	3
56	Perry	2
57	Pike	29
58	Pontotoc	3
59	Prentiss	2
60	Quitman	5
61	Rankin	16
62	Scott	6
63	Sharkey	8
64	Simpson	4
65	Smith	1
66	Stone	1
67	Sunflower	5
68	Tallahatchie	11
69	Tate	10
70	Tippah	3
71	Tishomingo	17
72	Tunica	8
73	Union	5
74	Walthall	6
75	Warren	78
76	Washington	25
77	Wayne	2
78	Webster	3
79	Wilkinson	16
80	Winston	8
81	Yalobusha	4
82	Yazoo	16
(duplicates)		(8)
Total:		1,523

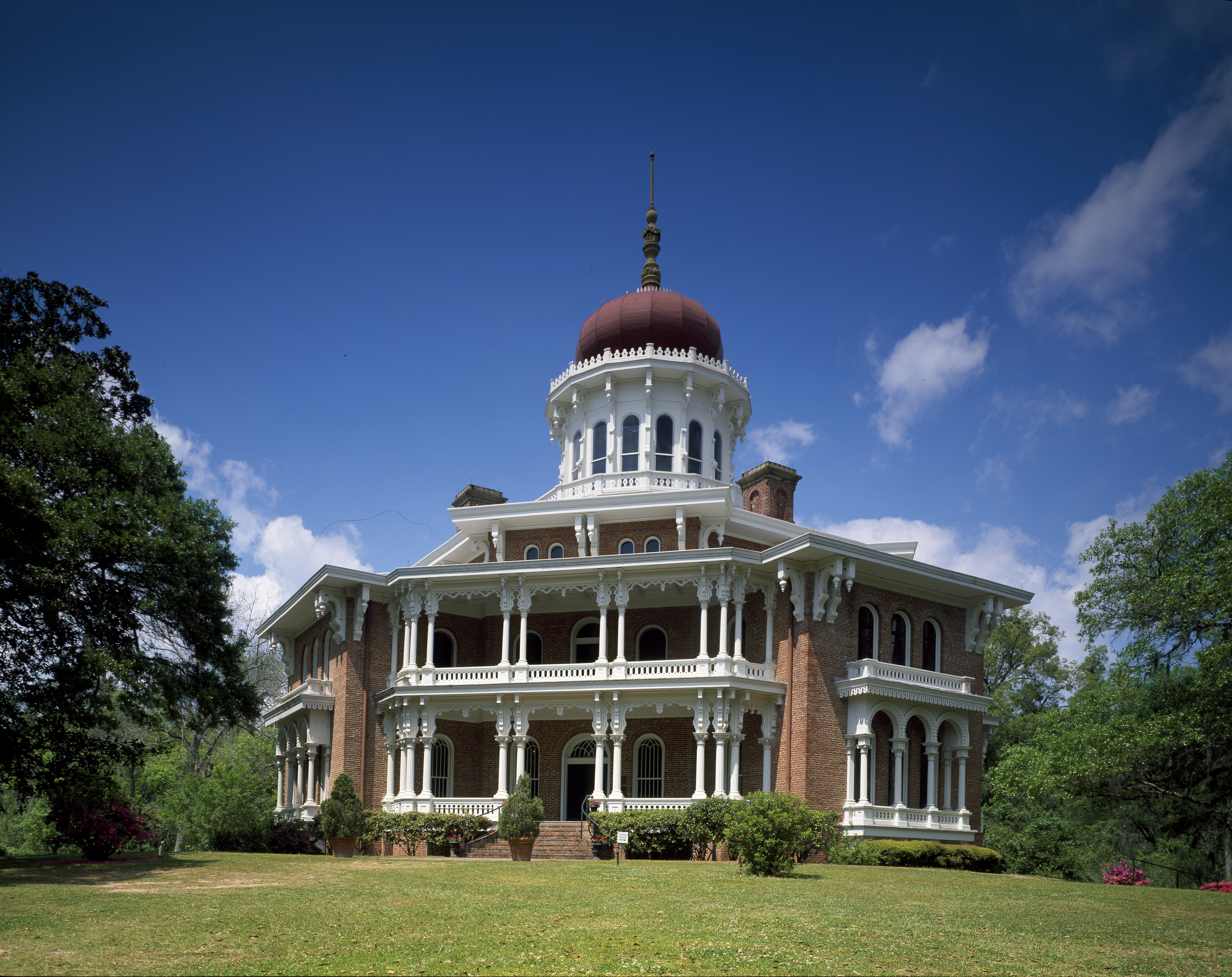
Longwood in Adams County.

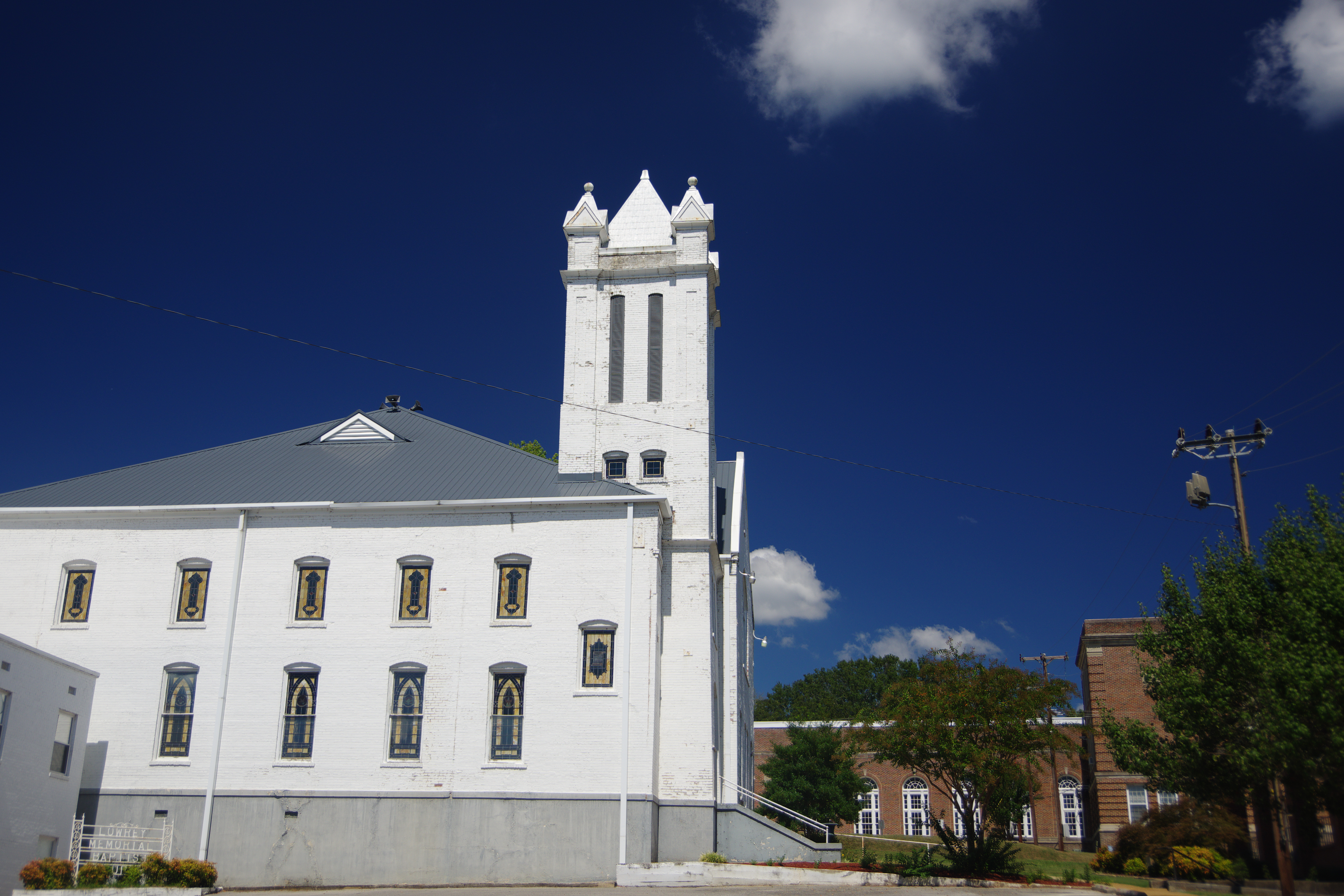
Blue Mountain Christian University in Tippah County.

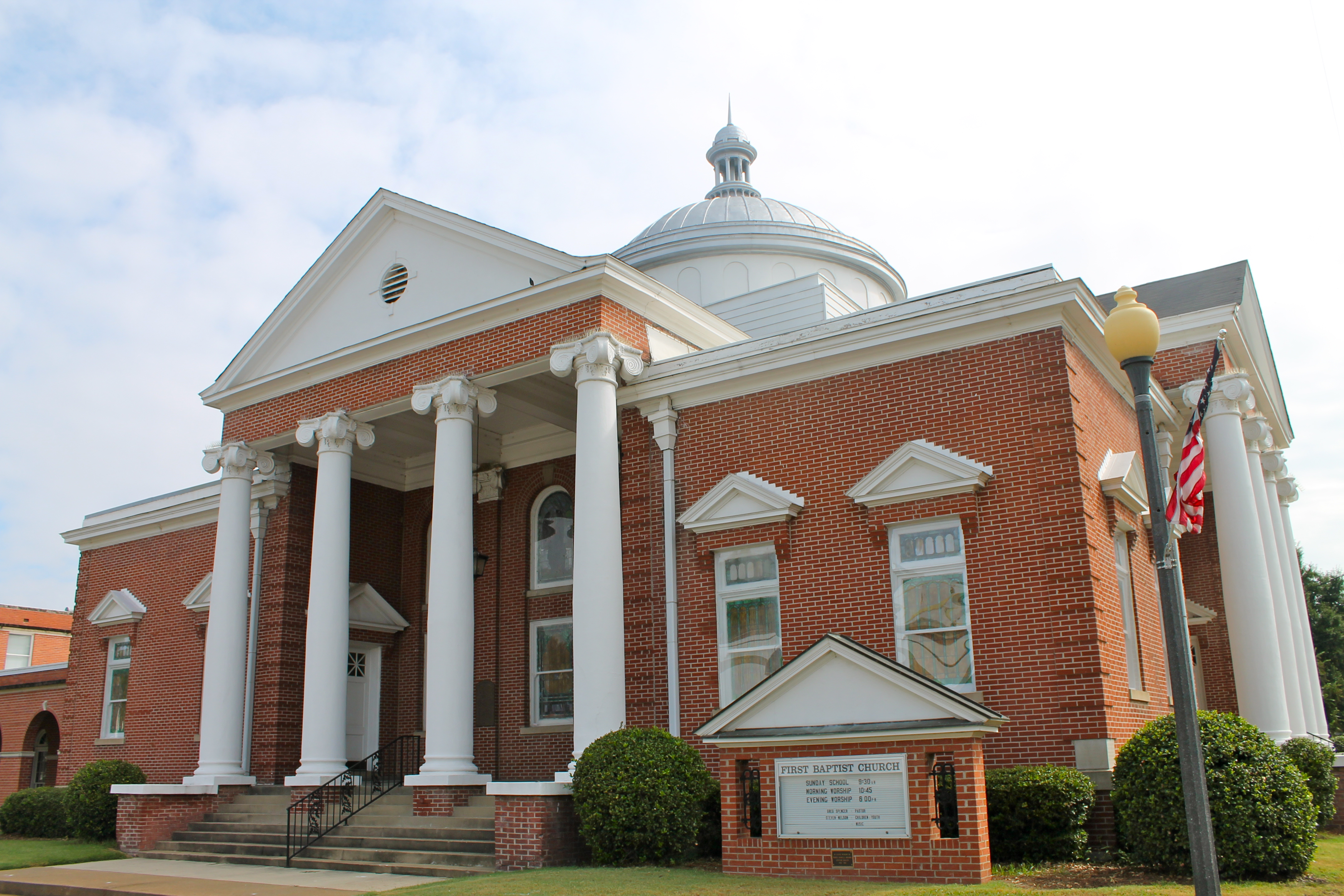
Indianola Historic District in Sunflower County.

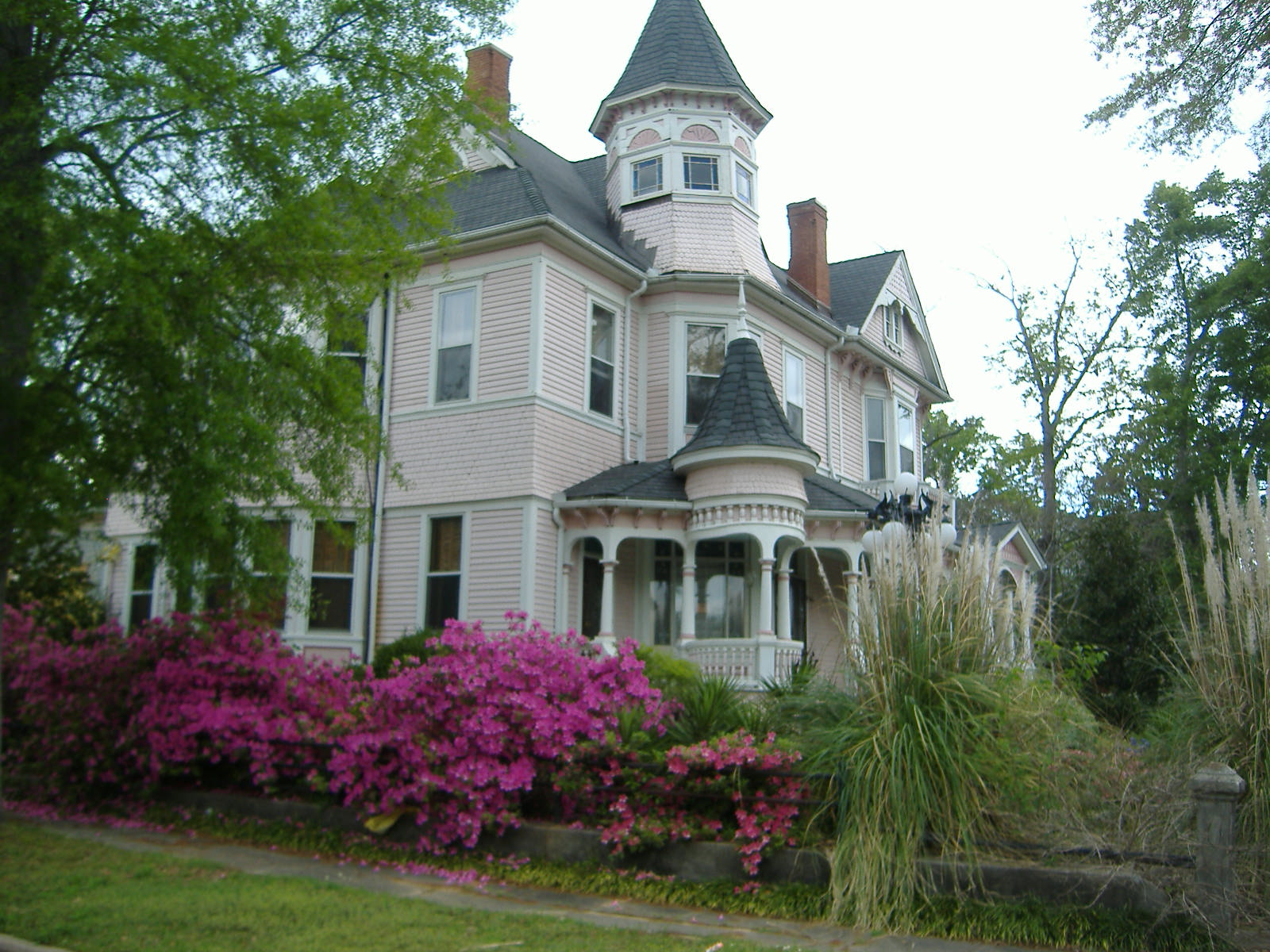
The Elson-Dudley House in Lauderdale County.

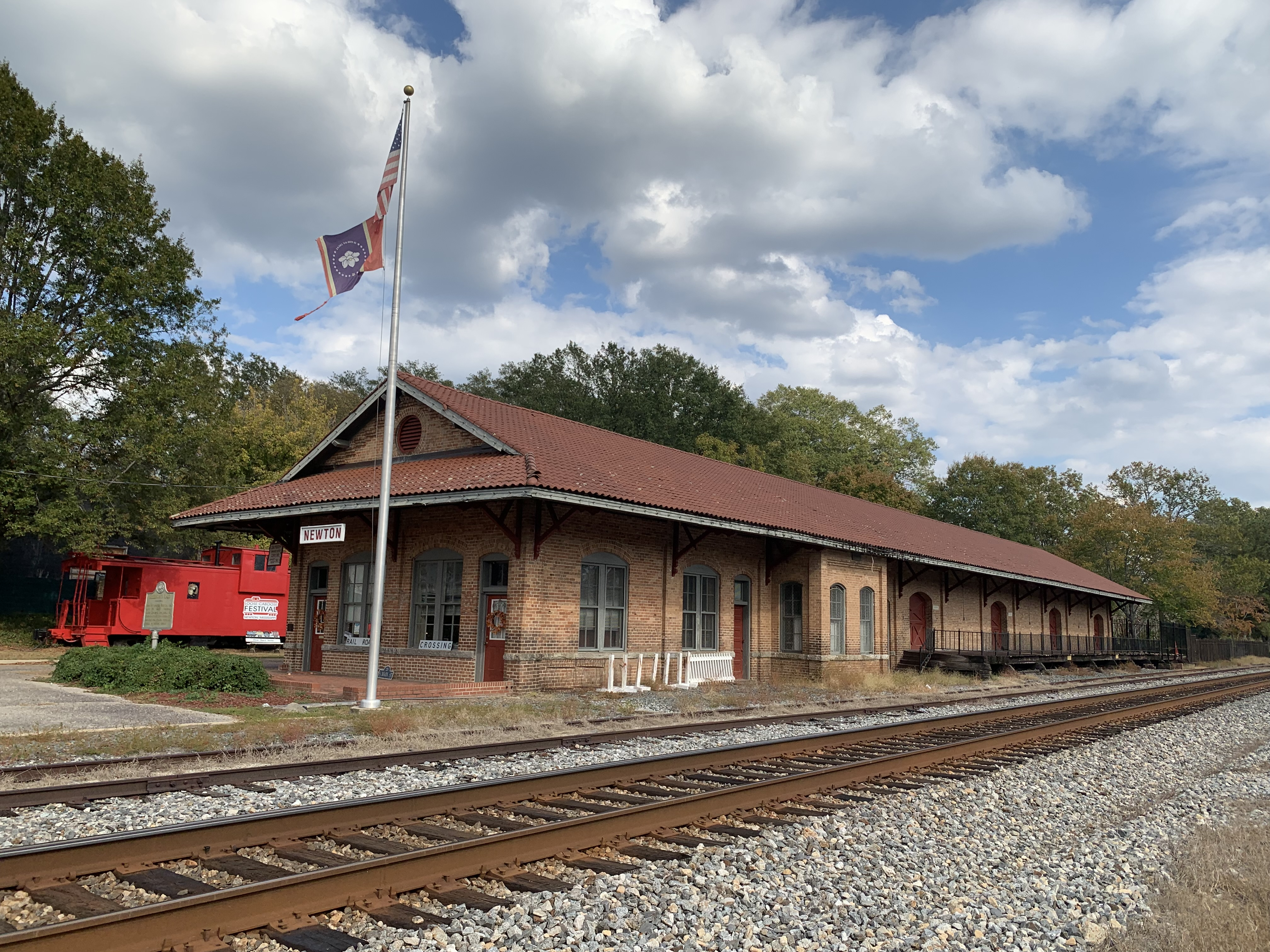
Alabama and Vicksburg Railroad Depot in Newton County

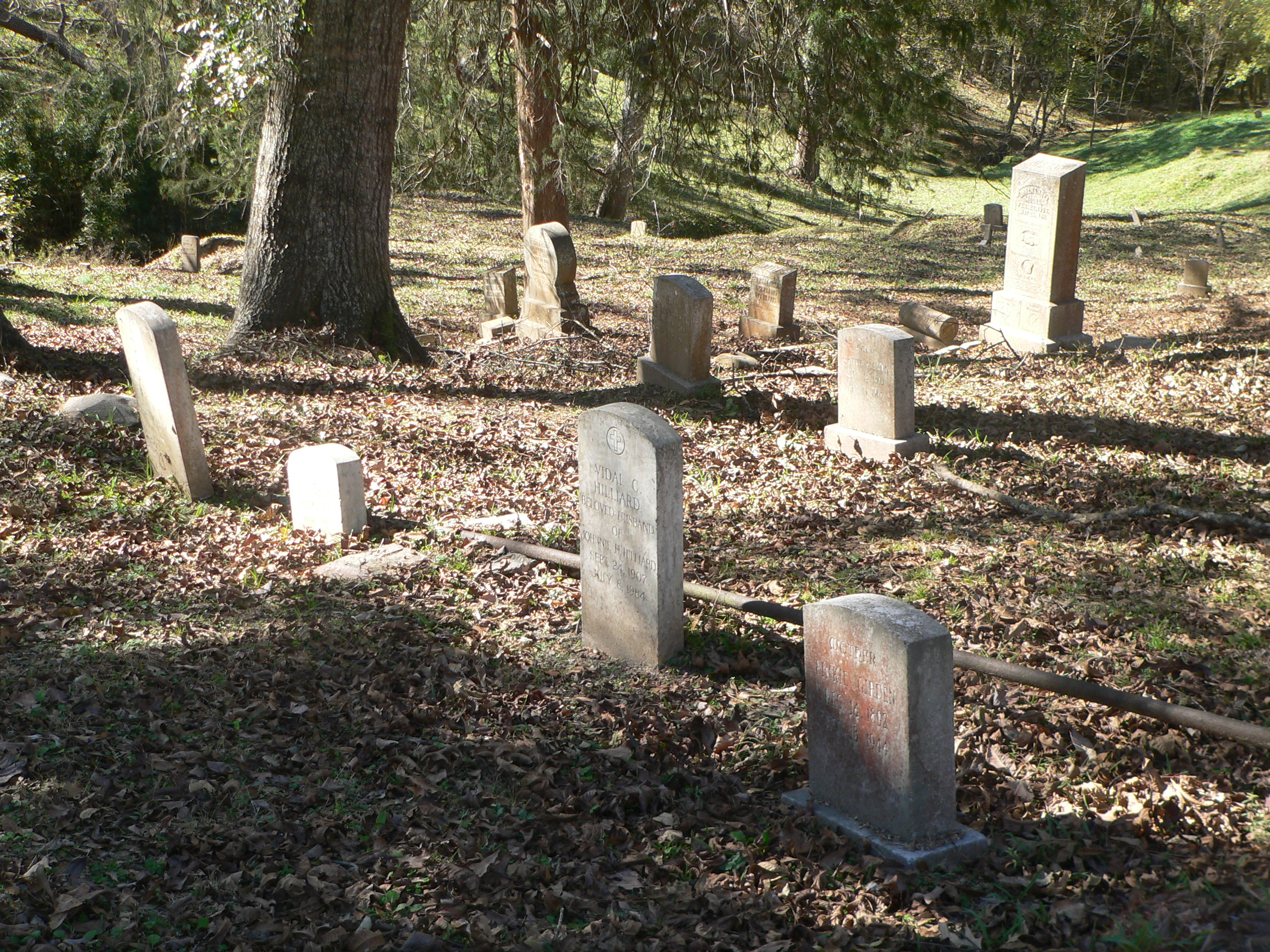
Beulah Cemetery in Warren County

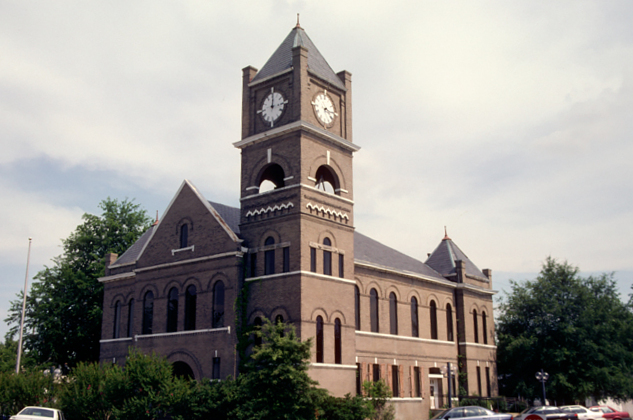
County Courthouse in Tallahatchie County

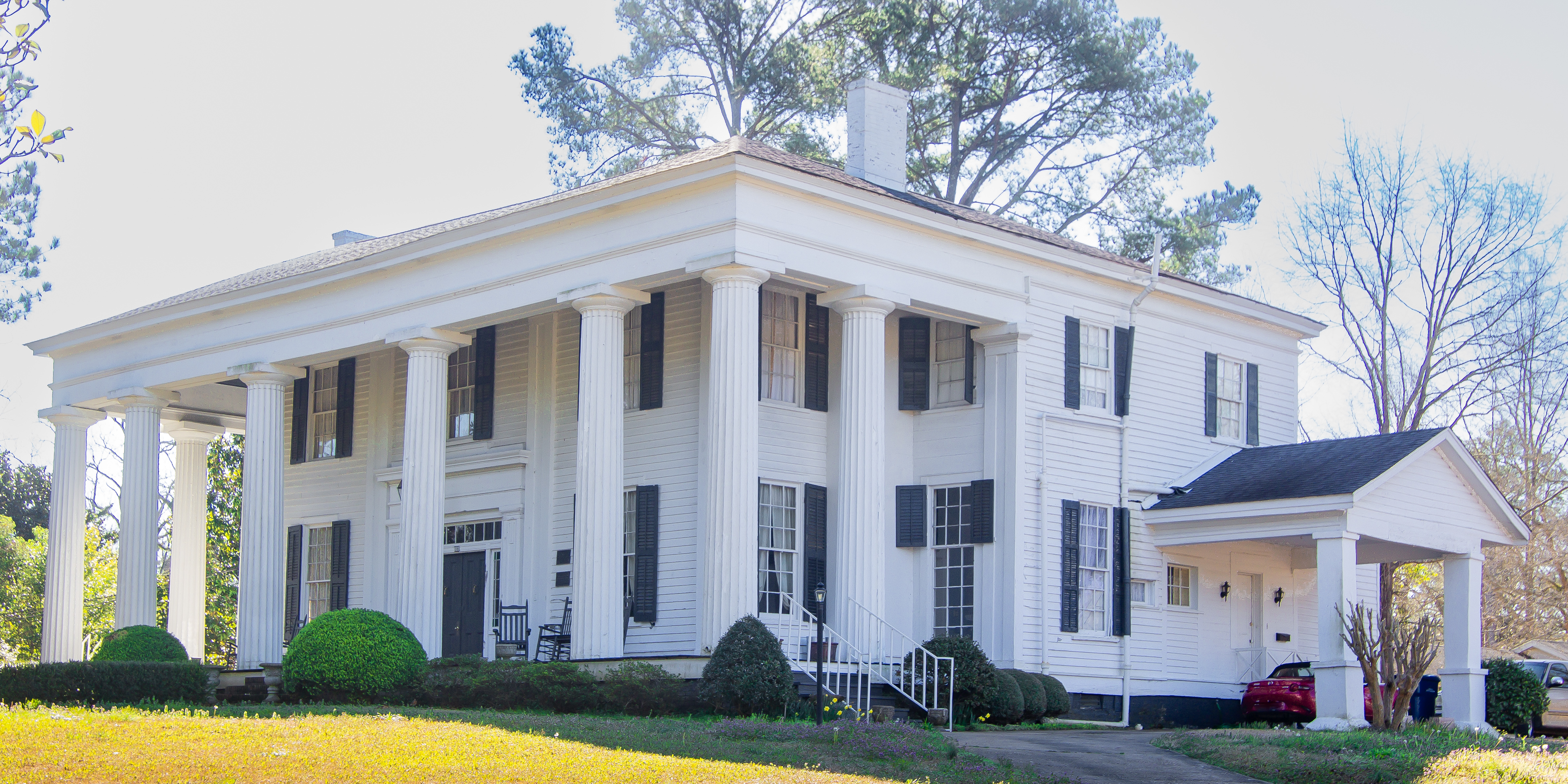
Reuben Davis House in Monroe County

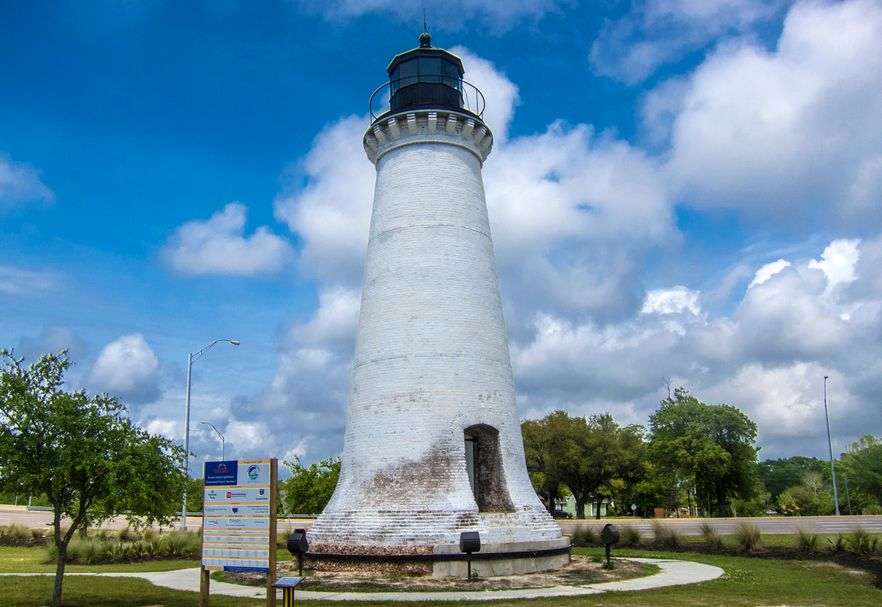
Round Island Lighthouse in Jackson County

== See also ==
- List of National Historic Landmarks in Mississippi
- List of Mississippi Landmarks
- List of historical societies in Mississippi
