= National Register of Historic Places listings in Calhoun County, Mississippi =

Location of Calhoun County in Mississippi

This is a list of the National Register of Historic Places listings in Calhoun County, Mississippi.

This is intended to be a complete list of the properties and districts on the National Register of Historic Places in Calhoun County, Mississippi, United States. Latitude and longitude coordinates are provided for many National Register properties and districts; these locations may be seen together in a map.

There are 2 properties and districts listed on the National Register in the county.

This National Park Service list is complete through NPS recent listings posted October 23, 2026.

== Current listings ==
	Name on the Register	Image	Date listed	Location	City or town	Description
1	New Liberty School	New Liberty School	August 15, 1997 (#97000895)	Junction of County Roads 427 and 428; 33°53′08″N 89°13′30″W	Vardaman	Constructed 1908, used as school until 1952, converted to Community center
2	West Mound	West Mound	December 2, 1992 (#92001626)	Address restricted	Slate Springs	Prehistoric ceremonial site, 1499-500 AD

== See also ==
- List of National Historic Landmarks in Mississippi
- National Register of Historic Places listings in Mississippi
