= National Register of Historic Places listings in Jasper County, Mississippi =

Location of Jasper County in Mississippi

This is a list of the National Register of Historic Places listings in Jasper County, Mississippi.

This is intended to be a complete list of the properties and districts on the National Register of Historic Places in Jasper County, Mississippi, United States. Latitude and longitude coordinates are provided for many National Register properties and districts; these locations may be seen together in a map.

There are 5 properties and districts listed on the National Register in the county.

This National Park Service list is complete through NPS recent listings posted October 23, 2026.

== Current listings ==
	Name on the Register	Image	Date listed	Location	City or town	Description
1	Archeological Site No. 22-Js-572	Archeological Site No. 22-Js-572	November 10, 1993 (#93001150)	Address restricted	Bay Springs	
2	Archeological Site No. 22JS587	Archeological Site No. 22JS587	March 17, 1994 (#94000175)	Address restricted	Bay Springs	
3	Graham House		April 10, 2008 (#08000265)	36 County Road 1824; 32°07′43″N 88°59′28″W	Rose Hill	Constructed c. 1860; Destroyed by tornado 2011
4	Old Jasper County Jail		March 7, 1994 (#94000147)	Mississippi Highway 503; 32°01′48″N 89°02′11″W	Paulding	Constructed c. 1895
5	Montrose Presbyterian Church	Montrose Presbyterian Church	May 9, 2003 (#03000388)	County Road 20; 32°07′24″N 89°14′12″W	Montrose	Constructed c. 1910

== See also ==
- List of National Historic Landmarks in Mississippi
- National Register of Historic Places listings in Mississippi
