= National Register of Historic Places listings in Jefferson Davis County, Mississippi =

Location of Jefferson Davis County in Mississippi

This is a list of the National Register of Historic Places listings in Jefferson Davis County, Mississippi.

This is intended to be a complete list of the properties and districts on the National Register of Historic Places in Jefferson Davis County, Mississippi, United States. Latitude and longitude coordinates are provided for many National Register properties and districts; these locations may be seen together in a map.

There are 5 properties and districts listed on the National Register in the county.

This National Park Service list is complete through NPS recent listings posted March 14, 2025.

== Current listings ==
	Name on the Register	Image	Date listed	Location	City or town	Description
1	1907 House		February 14, 1979 (#79001321)	East of Prentiss on Fort Stephens Road; 31°35′34″N 89°51′32″W	Prentiss	Constructed c. 1820, modified 1907
2	John Fielding Holloway House		October 28, 1994 (#94001252)	U.S. Route 84, about 450 feet east of its junction with Mississippi Highway 541, in Mount Carmel community 31°38′42″N 89°47′17″W	Mount Carmel	Constructed c. 1873
3	Jefferson Davis County Courthouse	Jefferson Davis County Courthouse	November 10, 1994 (#94001308)	Junction of North Columbia Avenue and 3rd Street; 31°36′02″N 89°51′55″W	Prentiss	Constructed in 1907
4	Prentiss Normal and Industrial Institute Historic District		May 16, 2016 (#16000282)	292 J.E. Johnson Rd. 31°35′04″N 89°51′24″W	Prentiss	
5	Stephen H. Wilkes House		December 20, 2006 (#06001176)	1522 South Williamsburg Road; 31°26′06″N 89°44′57″W	Bassfield	Constructed c. 1825

== See also ==
- List of National Historic Landmarks in Mississippi
- National Register of Historic Places listings in Mississippi
