= National Register of Historic Places listings in Benton County, Mississippi =

Location of Benton County in Mississippi

This is a list of the National Register of Historic Places listings in Benton County, Mississippi.

This is intended to be a complete list of the properties and districts on the National Register of Historic Places in Benton County, Mississippi, United States. Latitude and longitude coordinates are provided for many National Register properties and districts; these locations may be seen together in a map.

There are two properties listed on the National Register in the county.

This National Park Service list is complete through NPS recent listings posted July 18, 2025.

== Current listings ==
	Name on the Register	Image	Date listed	Location	City or town	Description
1	J. W. Crawford & Co. General Store		June 18, 2025 (#100011933)	1187 Spruce St. 34°36′49″N 89°11′19″W	Hickory Flat	
2	Davis' Mills Battle Site	Davis' Mills Battle Site	October 2, 1973 (#73001002)	Off Mississippi Hwy 7; 34°58′43″N 89°15′07″W	Michigan City	American Civil War battle site, fought December 21, 1862

== See also ==
- List of National Historic Landmarks in Mississippi
- National Register of Historic Places listings in Mississippi
