= National Register of Historic Places listings in Pearl River County, Mississippi =

Location of Pearl River County in Mississippi

This is a list of the National Register of Historic Places listings in Pearl River County, Mississippi.

This is intended to be a complete list of the properties and districts on the National Register of Historic Places in Pearl River County, Mississippi, United States. Latitude and longitude coordinates are provided for many National Register properties and districts; these locations may be seen together in a map.

There are 3 properties and districts listed on the National Register in the county.

This National Park Service list is complete through NPS recent listings posted October 30, 2026.

== Current listings ==
	Name on the Register	Image	Date listed	Location	City or town	Description
1	Shaw Homestead		January 24, 2019 (#100003345)	1214 Barth Rd. 30°41′45″N 89°21′03″W	Poplarville vicinity	
2	Tiger Hammock Site 22 PR 594	Tiger Hammock Site 22 PR 594	August 1, 1985 (#85001679)	Address restricted	Picayune	
3	The Hermitage		September 7, 2016 (#16000616)	1 River Rd. 30°32′29″N 89°41′40″W	Picayune	

== See also ==
- List of National Historic Landmarks in Mississippi
- National Register of Historic Places listings in Mississippi
