= National Register of Historic Places listings in Perry County, Mississippi =

Location of Perry County in Mississippi

This is a list of the National Register of Historic Places listings in Perry County, Mississippi.

This is intended to be a complete list of the properties and districts on the National Register of Historic Places in Perry County, Mississippi, United States. Latitude and longitude coordinates are provided for many National Register properties and districts; these locations may be seen together in a map.

There are 2 properties and districts listed on the National Register in the county.

This National Park Service list is complete through NPS recent listings posted March 14, 2025.

== Current listings ==
	Name on the Register	Image	Date listed	Location	City or town	Description
1	Mahned Bridge	Mahned Bridge	November 24, 1997 (#97001379)	Mahned Road over the Leaf River; 31°13′28″N 89°05′06″W	New Augusta	Constructed 1903, closed to vehicle traffic c. 1980s
2	Old Augusta Historic Site	Old Augusta Historic Site	April 24, 1979 (#79001334)	Along the Leaf River north of New Augusta; 31°13′28″N 89°02′59″W	New Augusta	Founded 1812, abandoned 1902-06

== See also ==
- List of National Historic Landmarks in Mississippi
- National Register of Historic Places listings in Mississippi
