= National Register of Historic Places listings in Tallahatchie County, Mississippi =

Location of Tallahatchie County in Mississippi

This is a list of the National Register of Historic Places listings in Tallahatchie County, Mississippi.

This is intended to be a complete list of the properties and districts on the National Register of Historic Places in Tallahatchie County, Mississippi, United States. Latitude and longitude coordinates are provided for many National Register properties and districts; these locations may be seen together in a map.

There are 11 properties and districts listed on the National Register in the county.

This National Park Service list is complete through NPS recent listings posted October 30, 2026.

== Current listings ==
	Name on the Register	Image	Date listed	Location	City or town	Description
1	Allison Mound (22Tl1024)	Allison Mound (22Tl1024)	December 14, 1988 (#88002708)	Address restricted	Webb	
2	Black Bayou Bridge		March 21, 2011 (#11000112)	2nd St. 33°49′26″N 90°17′38″W	Glendora	
3	Buford Site (22Tl501)		October 15, 1986 (#86002797)	Southeastern quarter of the southwestern quarter of Section 36, Township 25 North, Range 2 West; 33°59′14″N 90°21′28″W	Sumner	
4	Dell Bullion Mound (22Tl998)	Dell Bullion Mound (22Tl998)	December 14, 1988 (#88002706)	Address restricted	Grenada	
5	Dr. Tandy and Sarah Harrison House	Dr. Tandy and Sarah Harrison House	January 24, 2019 (#100003346)	112 S. Panola St. 34°00′23″N 90°03′25″W	Charleston	
6	Jacks Site	Jacks Site	March 24, 1978 (#78001630)	Address restricted	Philipp	
7	Lamb-Fish Bridge		May 17, 1982 (#82004631)	Northwest of Charleston; 34°01′20″N 90°11′32″W	Charleston	
8	Mitchell and McLendon General Merchants		September 23, 2025 (#100012270)	1027 Jackson Ave; 34°07′02″N 89°56′22″W	Enid	
9	Murphey-Jennings House		March 25, 1982 (#82004632)	307 Walnut St. 33°58′01″N 90°22′10″W	Sumner	
10	Spivey Site		December 6, 1978 (#78001629)	Address restricted	Crowder	
11	Tallahatchie County Second District Courthouse	Tallahatchie County Second District Courthouse	March 6, 2007 (#07000149)	108 Main St. 33°58′13″N 90°22′10″W	Sumner	

== See also ==
- List of National Historic Landmarks in Mississippi
- National Register of Historic Places listings in Mississippi
