= National Register of Historic Places listings in Prentiss County, Mississippi =

Location of Prentiss County in Mississippi

This is a list of the National Register of Historic Places listings in Prentiss County, Mississippi.

This is intended to be a complete list of the properties and districts on the National Register of Historic Places in Prentiss County, Mississippi, United States. Latitude and longitude coordinates are provided for many National Register properties and districts; these locations may be seen together in a map.

There are 2 properties and districts listed on the National Register in the county.

This National Park Service list is complete through NPS recent listings posted May 23, 2025.

== Current listings ==
	Name on the Register	Image	Date listed	Location	City or town	Description
1	Downtown Booneville Historic District	Downtown Booneville Historic District	November 5, 1998 (#98001337)	Roughly bounded by Church, College, Court, 1st, Hotel, Main, Market, and Mill Sts. 34°39′21″N 88°33′48″W	Booneville	
2	Pharr Mounds	Pharr Mounds	February 23, 1978 (#78000346)	Mile 286.7 on the Natchez Trace Parkway; 34°27′58″N 88°24′58″W	Kirkville	Extends into Itawamba County

== See also ==
- List of National Historic Landmarks in Mississippi
- National Register of Historic Places listings in Mississippi
