= National Register of Historic Places listings in Smith County, Mississippi =

Location of Smith County in Mississippi

This is a list of the National Register of Historic Places listings in Smith County, Mississippi.

This is intended to be a complete list of the properties and districts on the National Register of Historic Places in Smith County, Mississippi, United States. Latitude and longitude coordinates are provided for many National Register properties and districts; these locations may be seen together in a map.

There is 1 property listed on the National Register in the county.

This National Park Service list is complete through NPS recent listings posted March 14, 2025.

== Current listings ==
	Name on the Register	Image	Date listed	Location	City or town	Description
1	Taylorsville Signal Office and Watkins General Store		November 6, 1986 (#86003056)	326 Eureka St. 31°49′42″N 89°25′39″W	Taylorsville	

== See also ==
- List of National Historic Landmarks in Mississippi
- National Register of Historic Places listings in Mississippi
