= National Register of Historic Places listings in George County, Mississippi =

Location of George County in Mississippi

This is a list of the National Register of Historic Places listings in George County, Mississippi.

This is intended to be a complete list of the properties and districts on the National Register of Historic Places in George County, Mississippi, United States. Latitude and longitude coordinates are provided for many National Register properties and districts; these locations may be seen together in a map.

There is 1 property listed on the National Register in the county.

This National Park Service list is complete through NPS recent listings posted March 14, 2025.

== Current listings ==
| | Name on the Register | Image | Date listed | Location | City or town | Description |
|---|---|---|---|---|---|---|
| 1 | Bilbo Basin Shell Deposit Site | | February 25, 1992 (#92000039) | Eastern side of the Pascagoula River, southwest of Lucedale; 30°49′21″N 88°44′34″W | Lucedale | |

== See also ==
- List of National Historic Landmarks in Mississippi
- National Register of Historic Places listings in Mississippi
