= National Register of Historic Places listings in Itawamba County, Mississippi =

Location of Itawamba County in Mississippi

This is a list of the National Register of Historic Places listings in Itawamba County, Mississippi.

This is intended to be a complete list of the properties and districts on the National Register of Historic Places in Itawamba County, Mississippi, United States. Latitude and longitude coordinates are provided for many National Register properties and districts; these locations may be seen together in a map.

There are 2 properties and districts listed on the National Register in the county.

This National Park Service list is complete through NPS recent listings posted August 21, 2026.

== Current listings ==
	Name on the Register	Image	Date listed	Location	City or town	Description
1	Pharr Mounds	Pharr Mounds	February 23, 1978 (#78000346)	Mile 286.7 on the Natchez Trace Parkway; 34°27′58″N 88°24′58″W	Kirkville	Extends into Prentiss County

== See also ==
- List of National Historic Landmarks in Mississippi
- National Register of Historic Places listings in Mississippi
