= National Register of Historic Places listings in Sharkey County, Mississippi =

Location of Sharkey County in Mississippi

This is a list of the National Register of Historic Places listings in Sharkey County, Mississippi.

This is intended to be a complete list of the properties and districts on the National Register of Historic Places in Sharkey County, Mississippi, United States. Latitude and longitude coordinates are provided for many National Register properties and districts; these locations may be seen together in a map.

There are 8 properties and districts listed on the National Register in the county.

This National Park Service list is complete through NPS recent listings posted October 30, 2026.

== Current listings ==
	Name on the Register	Image	Date listed	Location	City or town	Description
1	Cary Site (22Sh507)	Cary Site (22Sh507)	December 14, 1988 (#88002705)	Address restricted	Cary	
2	Dr. Early Colman and Ann Foote Clements House		March 30, 2026 (#100012865)	228 West Race Street; 32°54′21″N 90°52′58″W	Rolling Fork	
3	Georgianna		January 28, 2019 (#100003353)	SW of jct. of Powell & Cary-Blanton Rds. 32°47′30″N 90°57′09″W	Cary vicinity	
4	Leist A Site (22Sh520;22N1)		December 14, 1988 (#88002700)	3 miles (4.8 km) north of the confluence of the Big and Little Sunflower Rivers; 32°39′40″N 90°43′48″W	Rolling Fork	
5	Rolling Fork Mounds		October 18, 1974 (#74001065)	Southwest of Rolling Fork; 32°53′47″N 90°52′44″W	Rolling Fork	
6	Savory Site (22-Sh-518)	Savory Site (22-Sh-518)	July 28, 1988 (#88001141)	Address restricted	Holly Bluff	
7	Spanish Fort Site (22SH500)		April 6, 1988 (#88000234)	Spanish Fort Rd., south of Holly Bluff; 32°45′17″N 90°43′30″W	Holly Bluff	
8	Tucker House		March 20, 2024 (#100009021)	12862 US 61; 32°48′39″N 90°55′30″W	Cary	

== See also ==
- List of National Historic Landmarks in Mississippi
- National Register of Historic Places listings in Mississippi
