= Commercial Bank and Banker's House =

- U.S. National Register of Historic Places
- U.S. National Historic Landmark
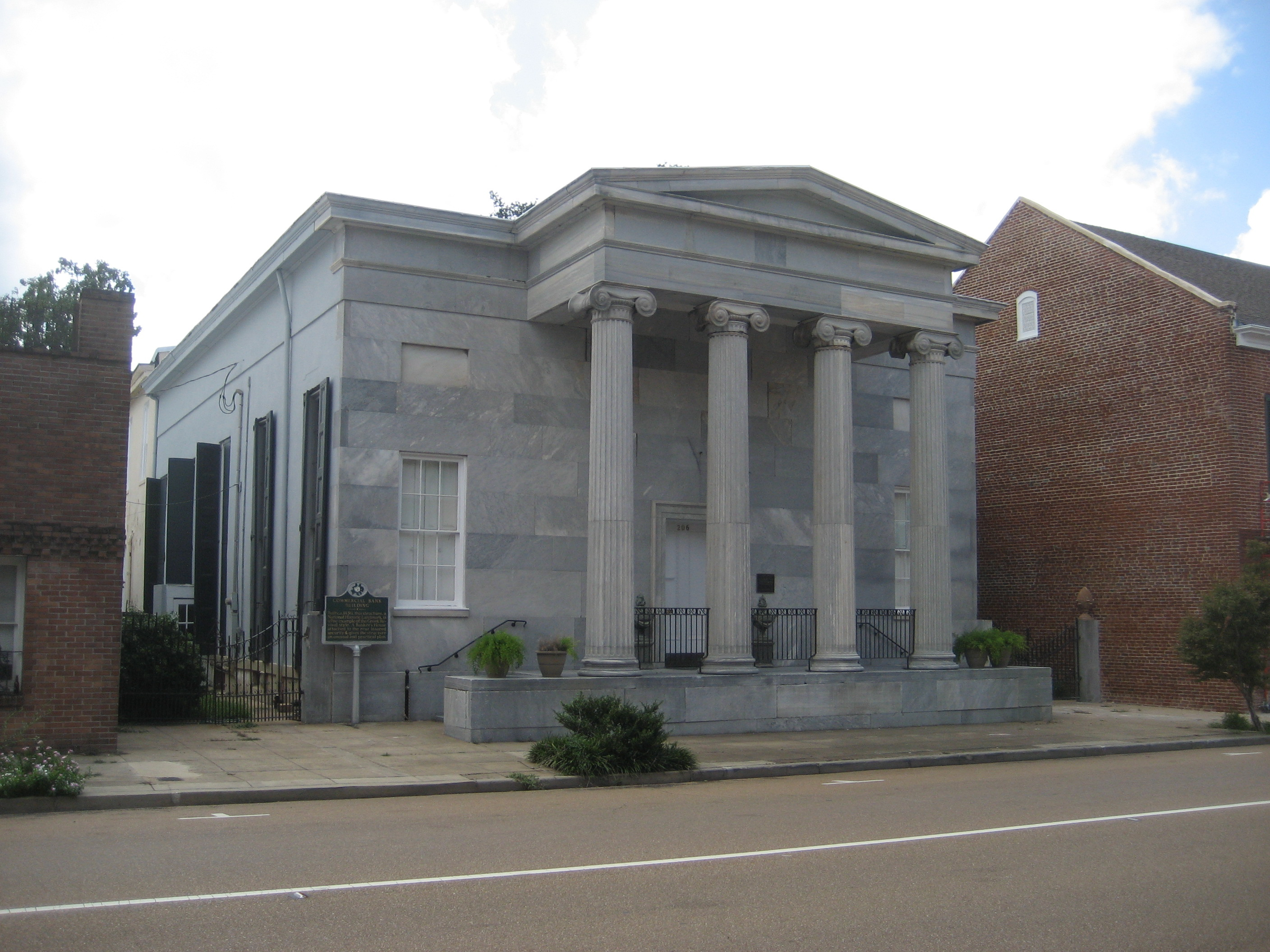
- Front of the Commercial Bank

- Location within Mississippi Location within the United States
- Location: 206 Main Street and 107 South Canal Street, Natchez, Mississippi
- Coordinates: 31°33′38.98″N 91°24′18″W
- Built: 1838
- Architectural style: Greek Revival
- NRHP reference No.: 74002252

Significant dates
- Added to NRHP: May 30, 1974
- Designated NHL: May 30, 1974

The Commercial Bank and Banker's House is an unusual combination building, housing both a bank premises and the principal banker's residence, at 206 Main Street and 107 Canal Street in Natchez, Mississippi. Built in 1833, it is a remarkably high-quality and well-preserved example of Greek Revival architecture. It was designated a National Historic Landmark in 1974. The bank portion of the building, used for a time by a Christian Science congregation, is presently vacant, while the house portion is a private residence. Both buildings have carved limestone used extensively, columns, lintels, window sills, and the entire facade is carved limestone, with the walls being 20" thick brick construction with scored plaster to have the appearance of large limestone blocks.

== Description and history ==
The Commercial Bank and Banker's House are a single structure that occupies what are now two separate properties. The two parcels form an "L" shape surrounding an unrelated commercial building at the southern junction of South Canal and Main Streets in downtown Natchez. The bank portion of the building faces Main Street, while the house faces South Canal Street, with an intervening front yard. The bank portion is a tall single-story building, with a facade of dressed marble. Its side walls, and those of the house, are finished in stuccoed brick. The bank facade has a Greek Temple projection, with four Ionic columns supporting a full entablature and gabled pediment. The columns are set on a low plinth, with side-facing stairs providing access to the main entrance.

The house facade is five bays wide, with a center entrance sheltered by a simpler portico. This one has two Doric columns supporting a detailed entablature, with a wrought iron balcony railing above. The house's interior features hand-carved door and window surrounds. It has 28" high baseboards and large doors throughout. The rooms are large for this time period.

The Commercial Bank was chartered in 1833, and this unique building was constructed soon afterward. For security reasons, it was designed to contain both the bank and the banker's residence. Levin R. Marshall, who lived at the suburban Natchez Richmond estate, helped found the bank and served as president for several years. he is believed to have developed this residence for use as a townhouse for himself and his family. The house also features Italian marble mantels throughout, both upstairs and downstairs, which is unusual because wood mantels are typically used in less public spaces.

The bank portion of the building has seen a variety of uses over its history, including serving as a Christian Science center in the 1970s. It presently stands empty. The house portion is a private residence. which, in the past, was used as a school for girls and, for many years, as a boarding house. Local tradition claims that outlaw Jesse James once stayed there. It had a complete renovation in 2021/2022.

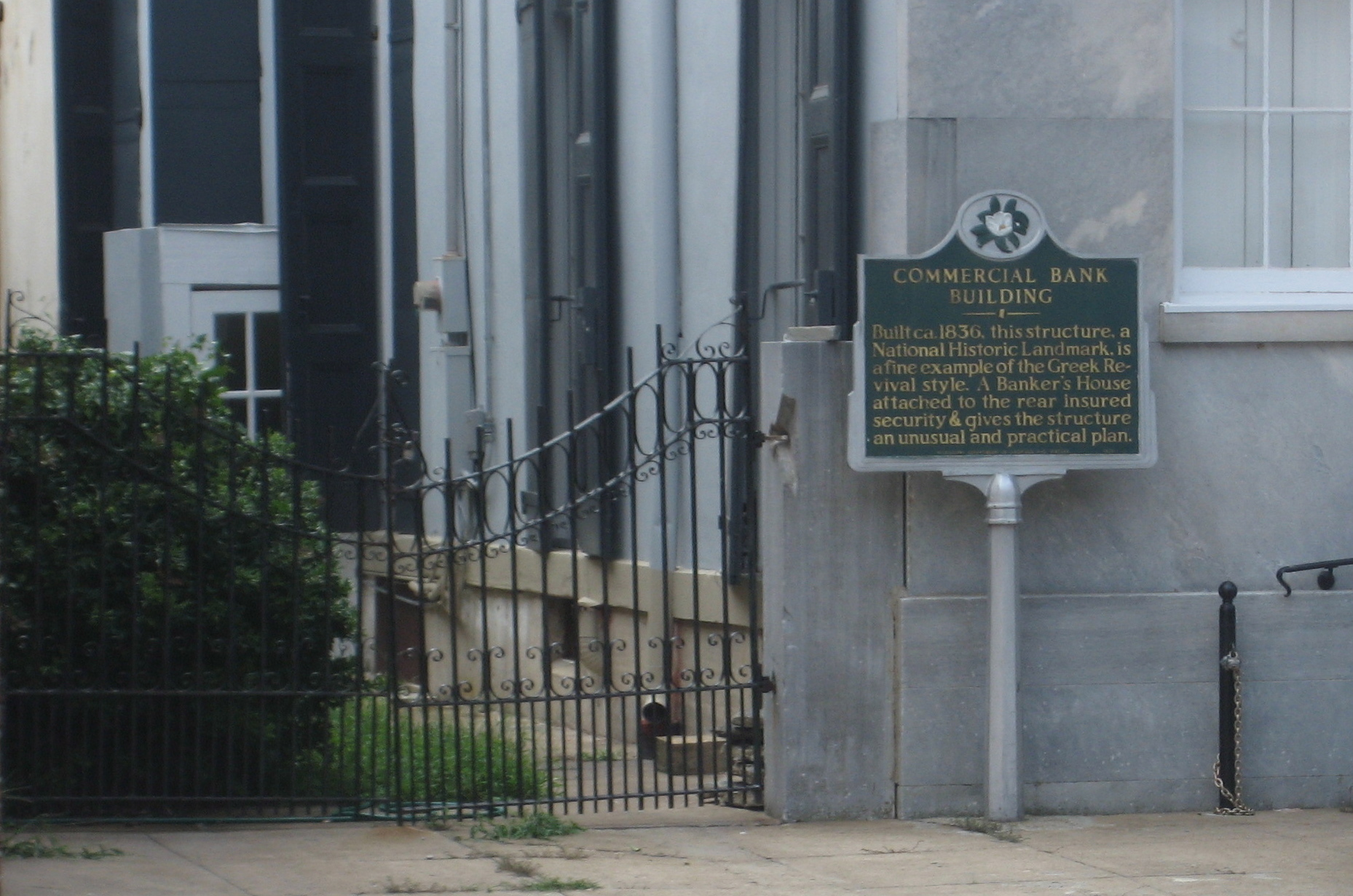
Historic plaque on front of bank, 206 Main Street

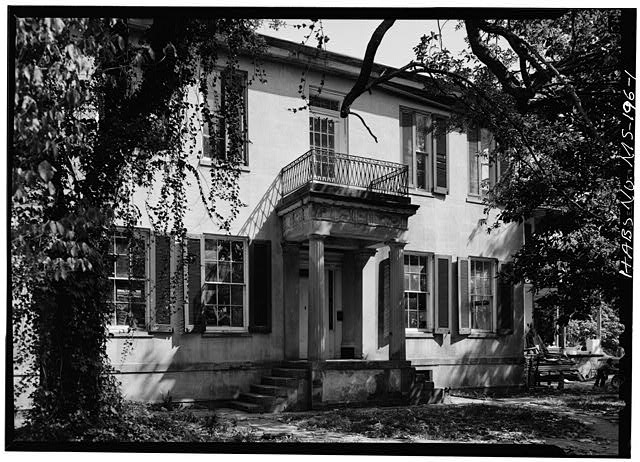
Banker's House, 107 Canal Street, front, HABS photo 1972

== See also ==
- List of National Historic Landmarks in Mississippi
- National Register of Historic Places listings in Adams County, Mississippi
