= Richmond (Natchez, Mississippi) =

Historic house in Mississippi, United States

- U.S. National Register of Historic Places
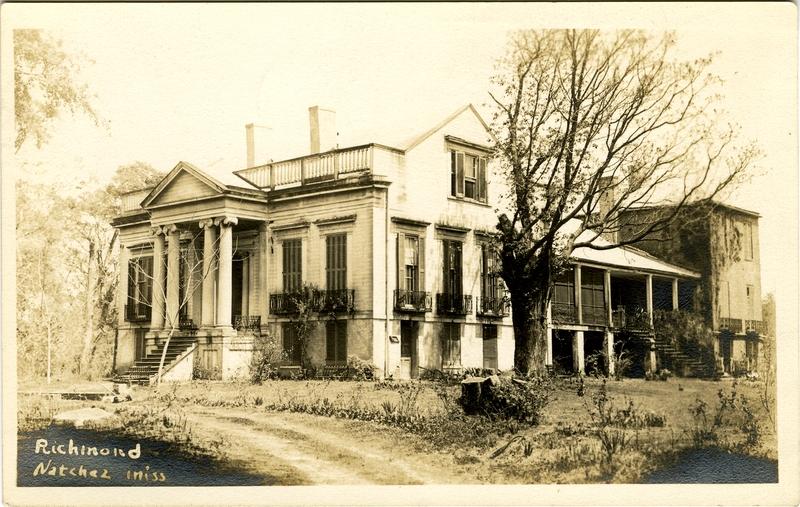

- Location within Mississippi Location within the United States
- Location: Government Fleet Road, Natchez, Mississippi
- Coordinates: 31°32′47″N 91°24′33″W
- Area: 4 acres (1.6 ha)
- Built: 1810
- Architectural style: Greek Revival
- NRHP reference No.: 78001584
- Added to NRHP: November 16, 1978

Richmond (also known as Marshall House) is a historic mansion in Natchez, Mississippi. It was the nineteenth century private residence of a leading businessman and agricultural landowner in Natchez.

== Location ==
The mansion is located on Government Fleet Road, also called Canal Street South, in Natchez, Adams County, Mississippi. The nearby terrain contains deep bayous and is heavily forested.

== History ==
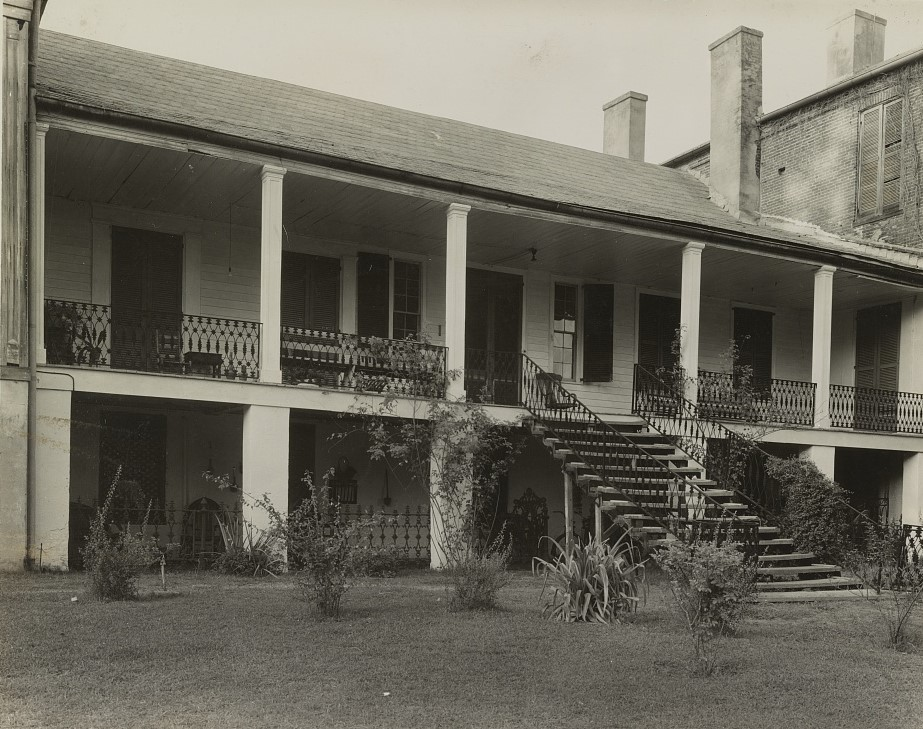
Richmond, by Frances Benjamin Johnston, 1938

The property was originally owned by Juan St. Germaine, a Native American interpreter. Local and family tradition claim a first construction date of 1784 for the mansion, though other sources use a ca. 1800-1810 date based on details of the original interior's Federal style woodwork.

In 1832, the property was purchased for $7,500 by Levin R. Marshall, a wealthy banker and planter who was the first president of the Commercial Bank. Shortly after, the furniture, which is still there, was shipped from New York City. Improvements were made in 1832, and by 1840, the house had been extended to the west with an addition in the Greek Revival architectural style. A third section was added in 1860.

Marshall was a wealthy businessman and invested in agriculture, by the start of the Civil War he had 2,500 acres in Adams County alone, worked by 150 slaves and another 32 servants at the Richmond mansion. His total holdings exceeded 25,000 acres in three states. His son, George, married a daughter of the very rich planter David Hunt and resided at Lansdowne. Richmond passed to Marshall's widow upon his death at age 69 in 1870, and was still occupied by the Marshall family in 2011.

== Heritage significance ==
Richmond has been listed on the National Register of Historic Places since November 16, 1978. Its primary significance is as the home of Levin R. Marshall and the role he played in the economic history of Natchez. The mansion is said to have been one of the most significant Greek Revival residences and was one of the first such in Natchez.
