= John Ford (minister) =

John Ford (February 27, 1767 – February 14, 1826) was a pioneering Methodist minister and political leader in South Carolina and in the Mississippi Territory.

He was born in Marion District, South Carolina on February 27, 1767, the son of James and Ann Townsend Ford. Little is known of his early life except that he obtained his ministerial license while living in South Carolina. John Ford married Catharine Ard, daughter of Thomas Ard, in Robeson County, North Carolina, in March 1790 and the couple resided in South Carolina for the next eight years.

Around 1798 the Ford family moved to the frontier of the Mississippi Territory and lived in the Natchez District until around 1805. Around 1809, the family built the famed John Ford Home, a three-story wood-frame structure on the Pearl River. The house was built at Fordsville (now known as the Sandy Hook, Mississippi Community), in Marion County, Mississippi, several miles south of the county seat of Columbia, Mississippi, where the Ford family took up the plow and started farming.

John Ford served two terms in the legislature of South Carolina and after moving to the Mississippi Territory was one of two delegates from Marion County, Mississippi to the first Mississippi Constitutional Convention in 1817 and a signer of the state's first constitution. The other delegate was Dougald McLaughlin.

The John Ford home was the site of the first Mississippi Methodist Conference in 1814 and the Pearl River Convention of 1816, which recommended partitioning the Mississippi Territory into the present-day states of Alabama and Mississippi. By the 1840s the Ford Home was sold to William Rankin and family, and successive generations of that family occupied this historic home for over one hundred years. Today the John Ford home is owned by the Marion County Historical Society and is a tourist attraction.
