= Sandy Hook, Mississippi =

- Unincorporated community
- Location within Mississippi Location within the United States
- Coordinates: 31°2′11″N 89°48′17″W
- Country: United States
- State: Mississippi
- County: Marion
- Elevation: 141 ft (43 m)
- Time zone: UTC-6 (Central (CST))
  - Summer (DST): UTC-5 (CDT)
- ZIP codes: 39478
- GNIS feature ID: 677389

Sandy Hook is an unincorporated community in Marion County, Mississippi, United States.

Sandy Hook is located on the former Illinois Central Gulf Railroad.

The John Ford Home is located in Sandy Hook. The home, built by John Ford in 1809, was the site of two Mississippi Methodist Conferences in 1814 and 1818 and the Pearl River Convention on Mississippi statehood in 1817. The home was surrounded by a stockade during the Creek War as protection for local settlers against attacks by Native Americans.

On April 19, 2020, Sandy Hook was hit by an EF4 tornado.

One of the few still-operating collections of the ShowBiz Pizza Place animatronic band The Rock-afire Explosion is operated in Sandy Hook at Smitty's Super Service Station.
