= John Ford Home =

Historic house in Mississippi, United States

- Ford House
- U.S. National Register of Historic Places
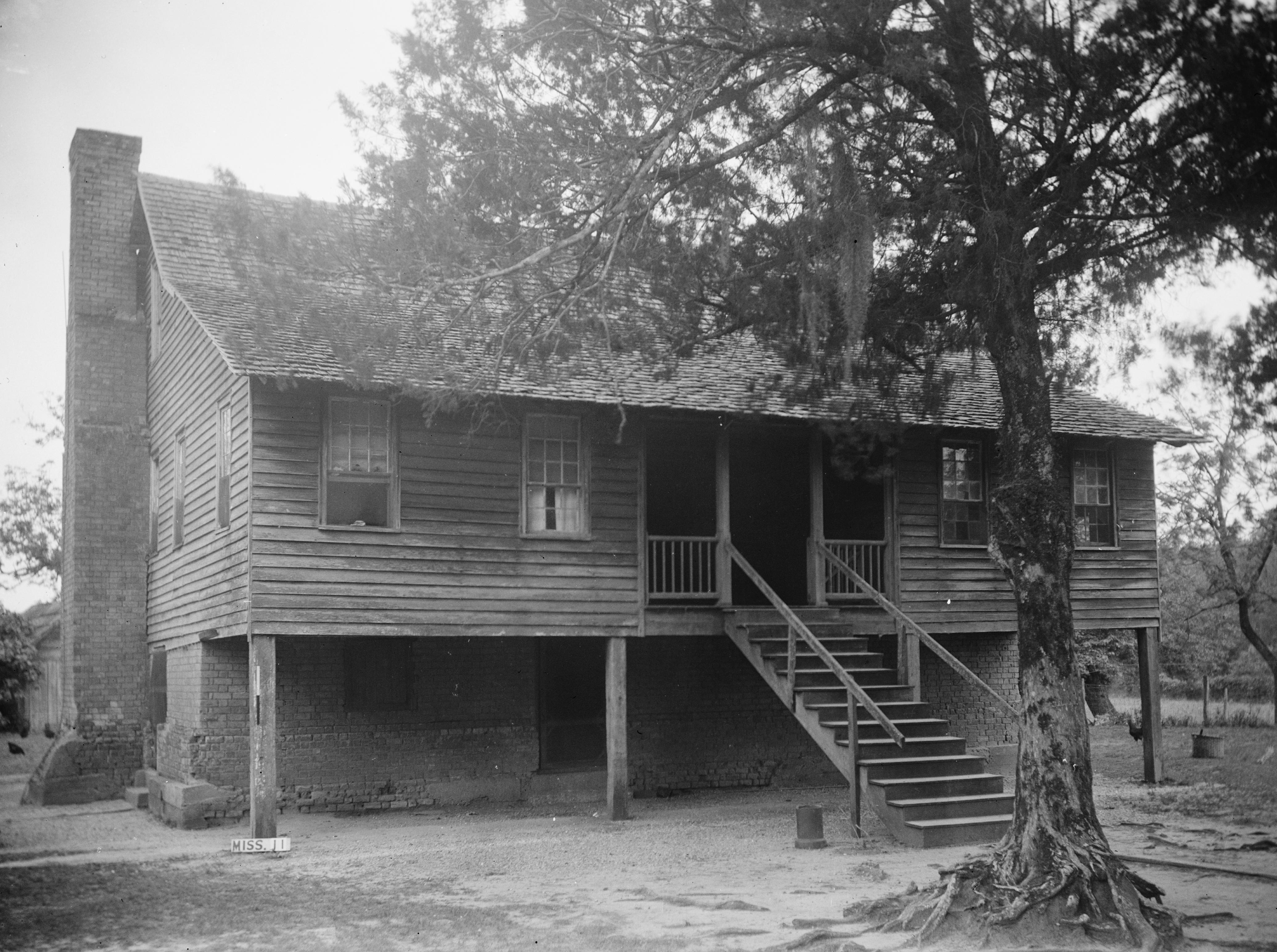

- Location within Mississippi Location within the United States
- Nearest city: Sandy Hook, Mississippi
- Coordinates: 31°0′44″N 89°47′11″W
- Area: 6 acres (2.4 ha)
- Built: 1810
- NRHP reference No.: 71000457
- Added to NRHP: June 21, 1971

The John Ford Home (also known as Ford Stockade or Ford's Fort) is a historic landmark located in Marion County, Mississippi, approximately 20 miles south of the city of Columbia, near the community of Sandy Hook. Built in 1809 by an early settler of the area, Reverend John Ford, the home is recognized by the National Register of Historic Places as an example of an "elevated frontier-style" structure that was common at the time in the Mississippi Valley along the Pearl River. The home is currently preserved by the Marion County Historical Society, and is available for public view.

== History ==
Reverend John Ford, an early settler of Marion County, Mississippi, built an elevated frontier-style home in 1809, 20 miles south of Columbia, Mississippi, on a parcel of land that would eventually encompass approximately 2,000 acres. Ford and his wife made their home available to travelers, most notably General Andrew Jackson who stayed in the Ford's home in 1814 in advance of his involvement in the Battle of New Orleans. Ford's home was the site of two Mississippi Methodist Conferences in 1814 and 1818, and the Pearl River Convention on statehood. The home was purchased by the Marion County Historical Society in 1962, and was listed on the National Register of Historic Places on 21 June 1971

== Tourism ==
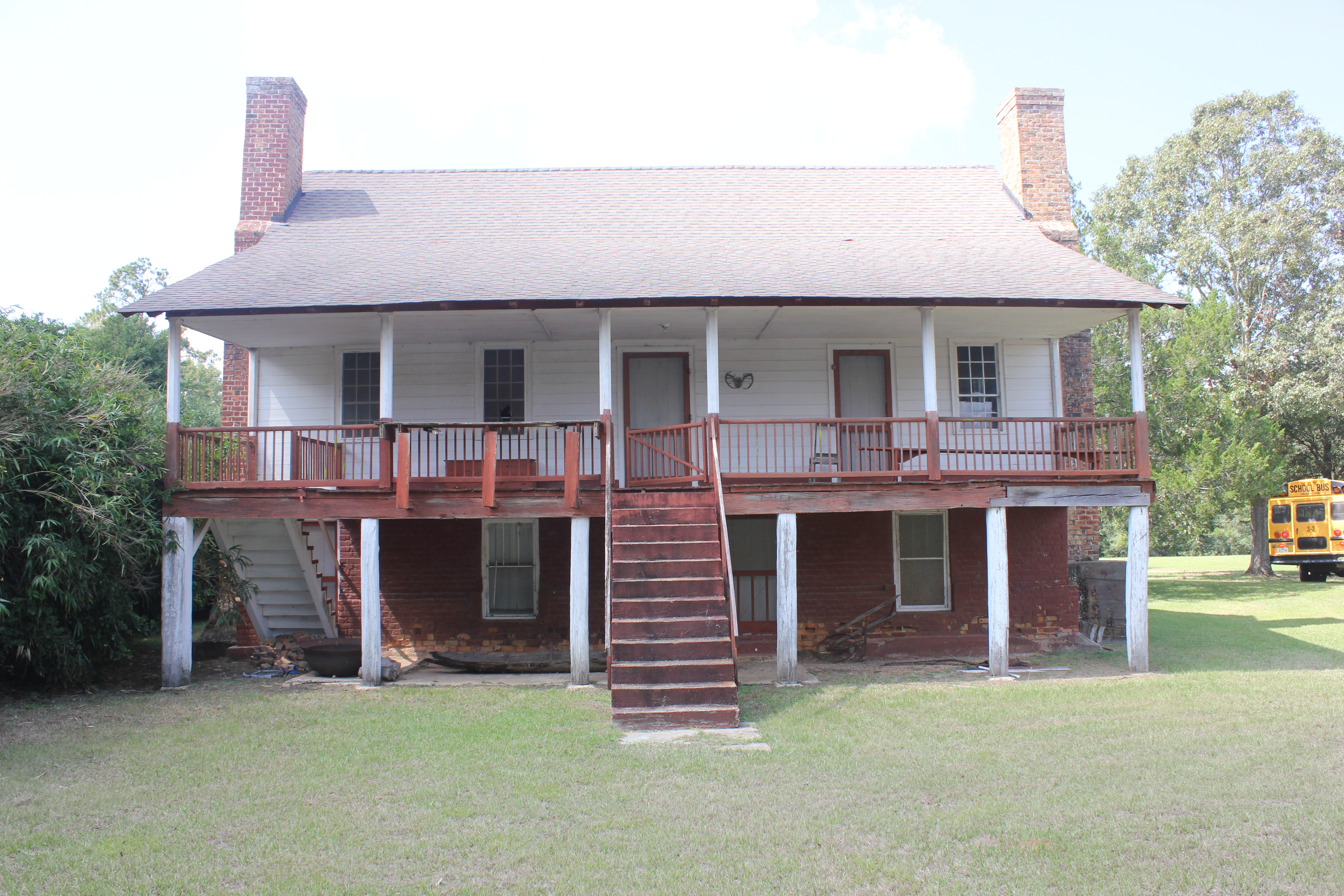

The John Ford Home is preserved in its original condition by the Marion County Historical Society, and is available for public view by appointment.
