= Ruleville station =

- Ruleville Depot
- U.S. National Register of Historic Places
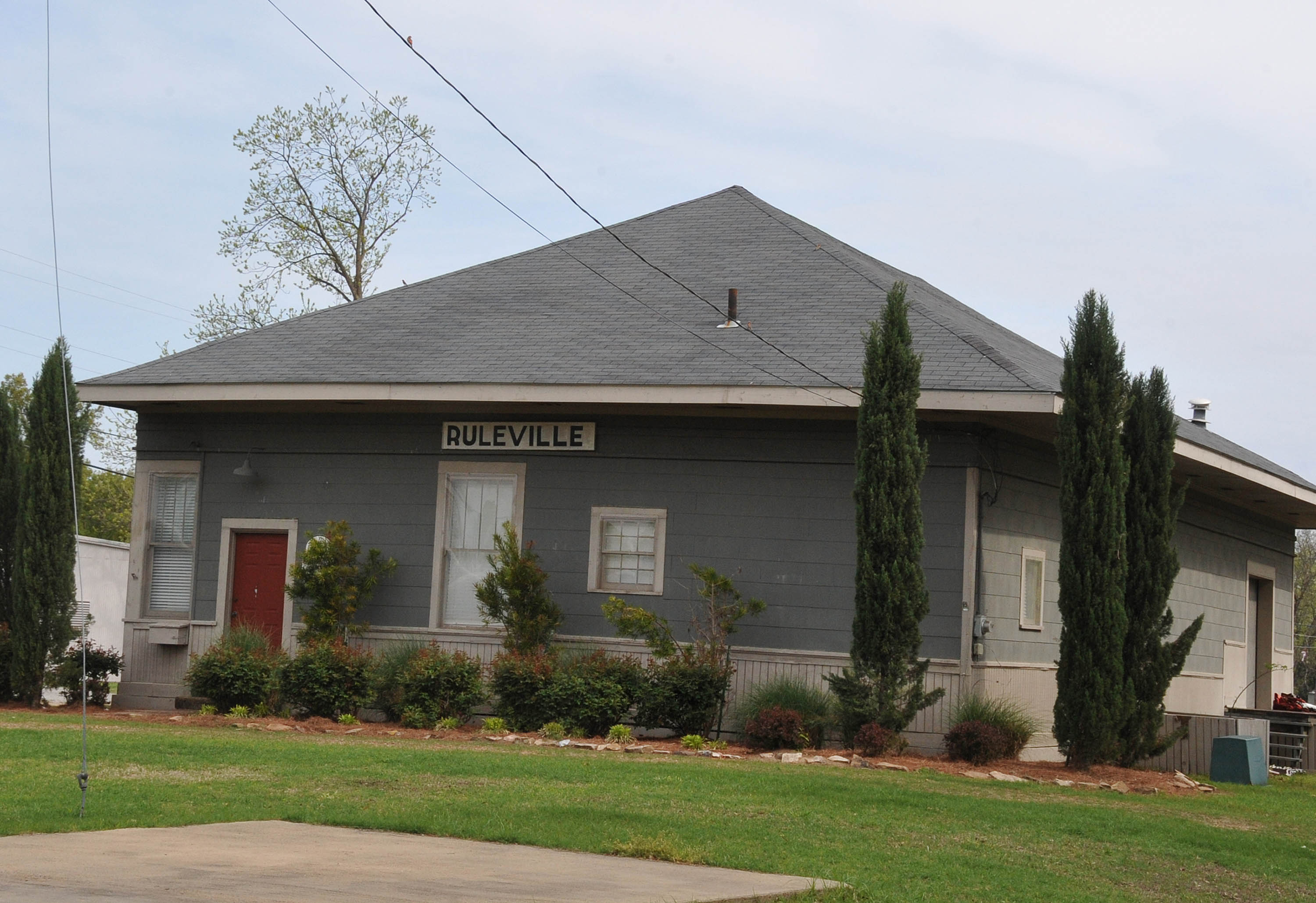

- Location within Mississippi Location within the United States
- Location: E side of RR tracks, jct. of E. Floyce St. and N. Front St., Ruleville, Mississippi
- Coordinates: 33°43′38″N 90°33′9″W
- Area: less than one acre
- Built: 1930
- Architectural style: vernacular depot
- NRHP reference No.: 99000841
- Added to NRHP: July 15, 1999

Ruleville Depot is a historic railroad depot on the east side of railroad tracks at the junction of East Floyce Street and North Front Street in Ruleville, Mississippi. It was constructed in 1930 by the Yazoo and Mississippi Valley Railroad following its purchase by the Illinois Central Railroad. Railway service to Ruleville began in 1897, when the Yazoo Delta Railroad built a line to the city; the original 1897 depot was replaced in 1913 after a tornado hit it, and the 1913 building was in turn replaced by the 1930 building. The station received both passenger and freight service, with two passenger trains and multiple freight trains serving the station each day. Passenger service to the station ended in the 1950s, and the station closed entirely in 1978. It is currently owned by the Ruleville Chamber of Commerce.

The station was added to the National Register of Historic Places on July 15, 1999.
