= Leaf River Bridge (Greene County, Mississippi) =

- U.S. National Register of Historic Places
- Mississippi Landmark
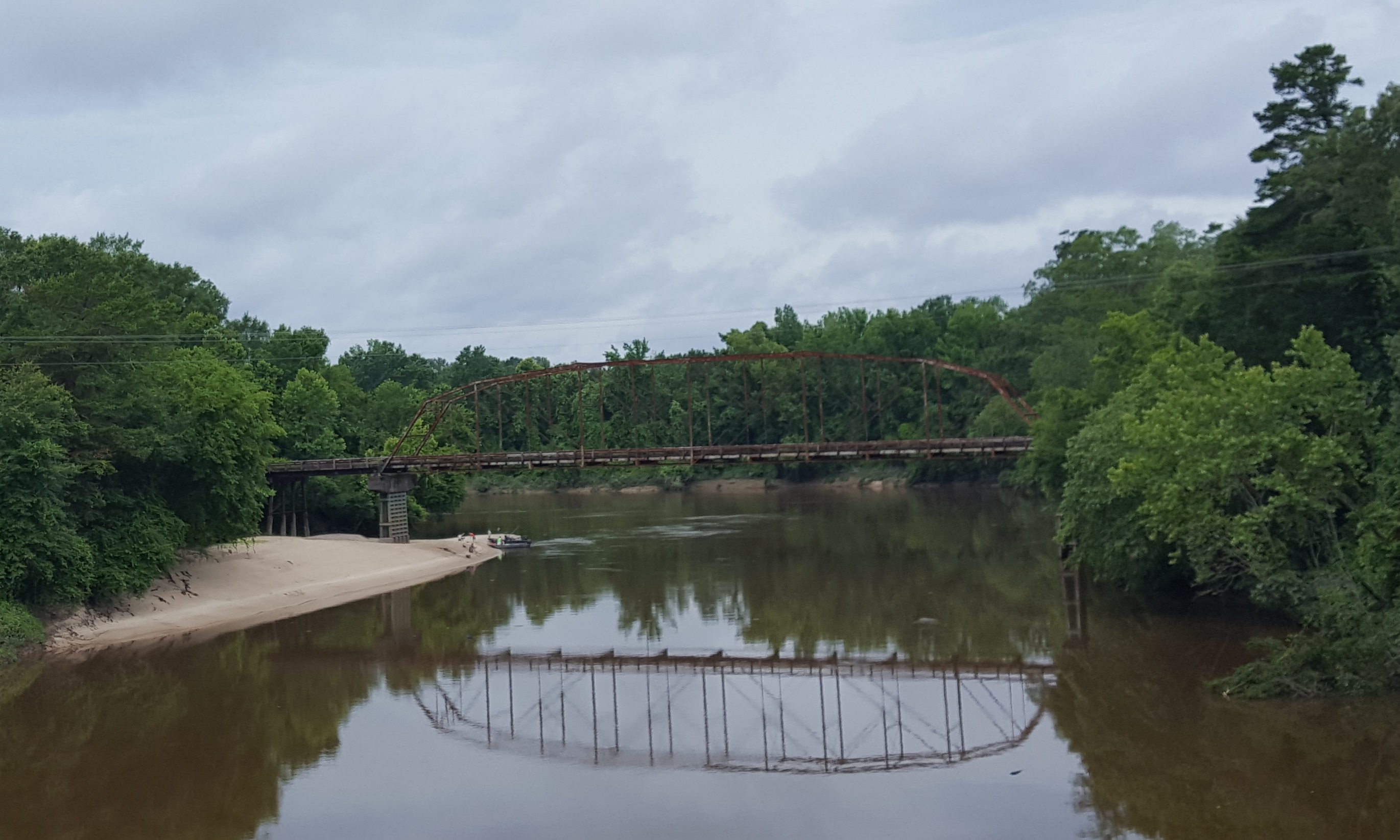
- Leaf River Bridge in 2017

- Location within Mississippi Location within the United States
- Nearest city: McLain, Mississippi
- Coordinates: 31°07′39″N 88°49′01″W
- Built: 1907
- Architectural style: Pennsylvania through truss
- NRHP reference No.: 88002478
- USMS No.: 041-MCL-6001-NR-ML

Significant dates
- Added to NRHP: November 16, 1988
- Designated USMS: August 4, 1987

The Leaf River Bridge was constructed in 1907 and spans the Leaf River in Greene County, Mississippi. When a new bridge was constructed across the Leaf River on a county road (old Mississippi Highway 24) north of McLain, the old bridge was removed from service and access was terminated. The 1907 bridge was declared a Mississippi Landmark in 1987 and was added to the National Register of Historic Places in 1988.

== Description ==
The 383-foot (117 m) bridge was constructed with a single Pennsylvania through truss span that measures 221 feet (67 m) in length. The width is 18 feet (5.5 m) with a 13-foot (4.0 m) deck. Vertical clearance is 14 feet (4.3 m) above the deck.
