= Lake Railroad Station =

Historic train station in Mississippi, US

- U.S. National Register of Historic Places
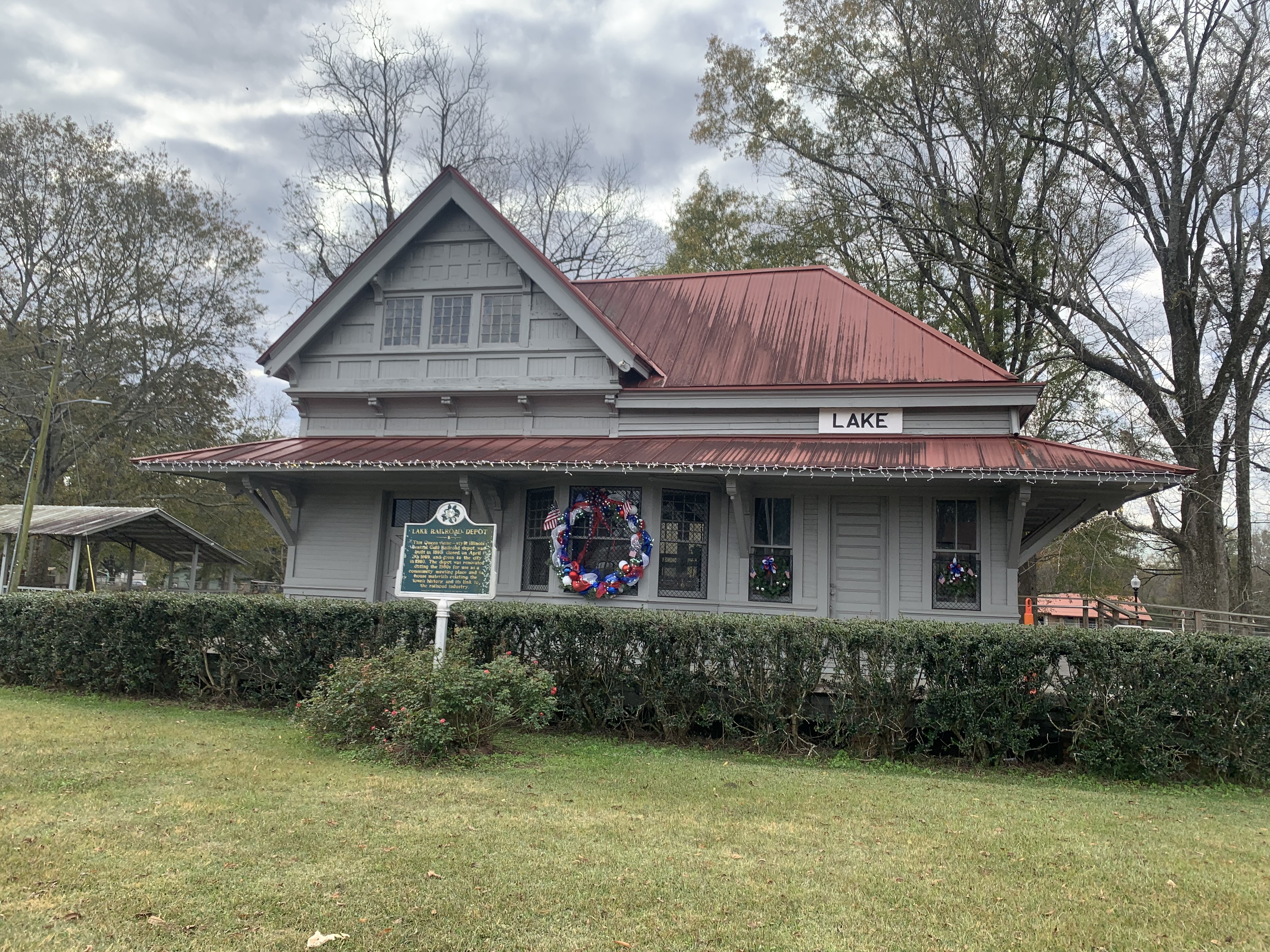
- Lake Railroad Station

- Location within Mississippi
- Location: Brook St., Lake, Mississippi
- Coordinates: 32°20′35″N 89°19′42″W
- Area: 1 acre (0.40 ha)
- Built: 1890
- Architectural style: Queen Anne
- NRHP reference No.: 84002346
- Added to NRHP: July 19, 1984

Lake Railroad Station is a historic train station located in Lake, Scott County, Mississippi. It was added to the National Register of Historic Places on July 19, 1984, for its architectural and historical significance.

== Description ==
The Lake Railroad Station is a small, Queen Anne-style building originally constructed around 1890. It features ornate details uncommon among rural Mississippi railroad stations, such as intricate cutwork on vergeboards, multi-textured wood surfaces, milled brackets, and a bay window in the station master's office. The interior is finished with tongue and groove wood paneling, painted in shades of light and dark gray.

Initially built as a passenger station, it included segregated waiting rooms on either side of the station master's office. These were later converted into freight and shared passenger spaces. The building includes a second-story storage area accessible by ladder.

== History ==
The station was first relocated in 1971 when it was sold by the railroad with the condition that it be removed from the property. It was later returned near its original site as part of a preservation and restoration effort led by local preservationists. In the mid-20th century, the station served as a vital hub for transportation and community activities. It was officially closed on April 30, 1969.

The Lake Railroad Station is one of the few surviving examples of Queen Anne-style depots in Mississippi and is considered one of the most architecturally significant buildings in the town of Lake.

== Significance ==
The station is significant for its association with the development of the Southern Railway and its role in the founding of Lake. It is a rare example of Queen Anne architecture applied to a railroad depot.
