= Indianola Historic District =

Historic district in Mississippi, United States

- U.S. National Register of Historic Places
- U.S. Historic district
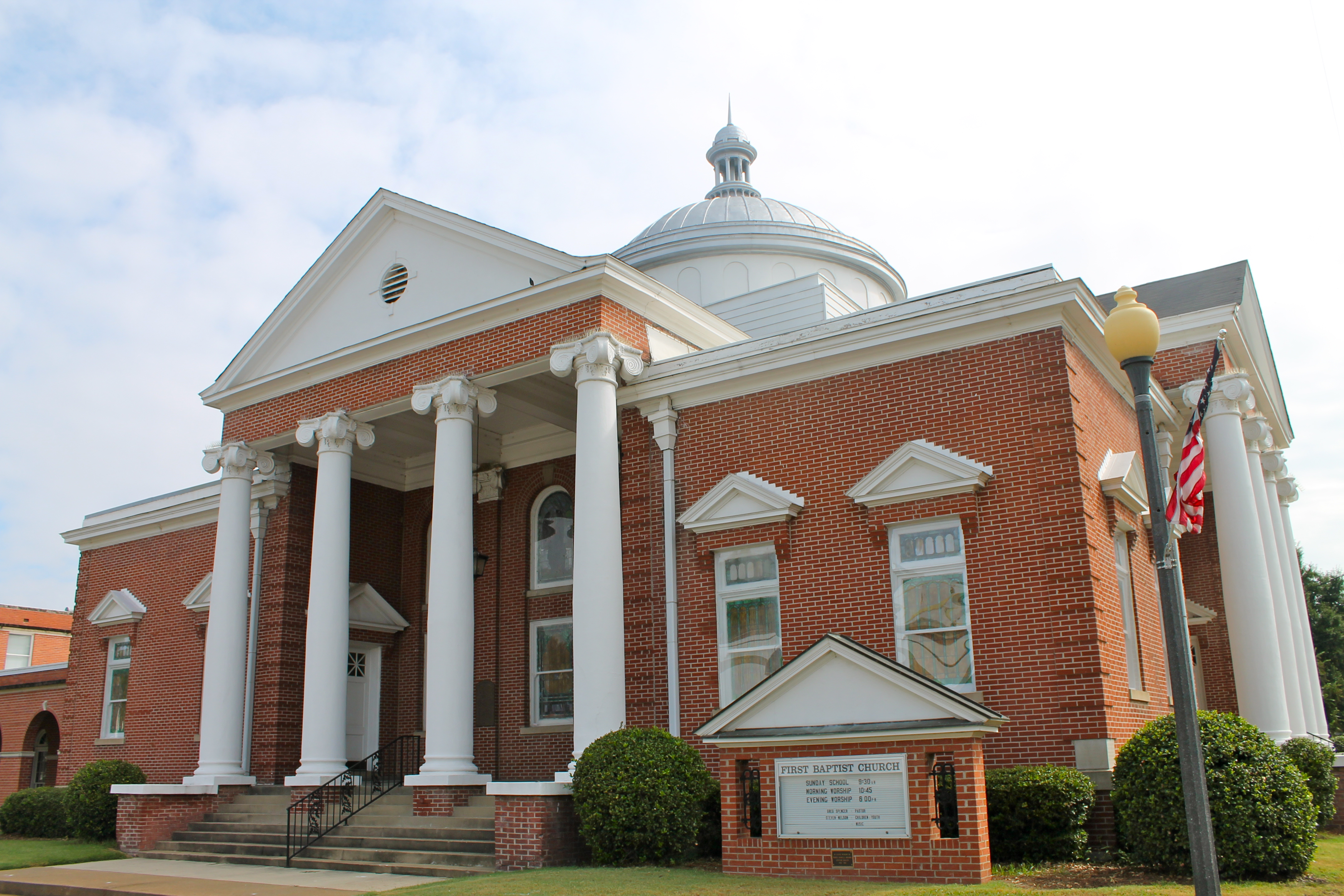
- First Baptist Church

- Location within Mississippi Location within the United States
- Interactive map showing the location of Indianola Historic District
- Location: Roughly bounded by Percy St. on the N., Front to Adair on the W. to Roosevelt, Roosevelt E. to Front Extended and N., Indianola, Mississippi
- Area: 160 acres (65 ha)
- Architectural style: Queen Anne, Tudor Revival
- NRHP reference No.: 09000356
- Added to NRHP: November 30, 2009

Indianola Historic District is a historic district in Indianola, Mississippi. The district is roughly bounded by Percy Street on the north, Front to Adair on the west to Roosevelt, Roosevelt on the east to Front Extended and north.

The district features Queen Anne style and Tudor Revival architecture. The area was added to the National Register of Historic Places in 2009.
