= List of National Historic Landmarks in Mississippi =

This is a List of National Historic Landmarks in Mississippi. It includes current National Historic Landmarks (NHLs), and also National Park Service areas in Mississippi that overlap.

== Key ==
| | National Historic Landmark |
| ^{†} | National Historic Landmark District |
| ^{#} | National Historic Site, National Historical Park, National Memorial, or National Monument |
| ^{*} | Delisted Landmark |

== List ==
There are 40 National Historic Landmarks in Mississippi. Five of these are also State Historic Sites. For consistency, the sites are named here as designated under the National Historic Landmark program. A cross-reference list of all seven State Historic Sites is provided further below, which uses different names for some sites. The NHLs are concentrated in 17 of Mississippi's 82 counties. Thirteen are in Adams County alone.

| | Landmark name | Image | Date designated | Location | County | Description |
|---|---|---|---|---|---|---|
| 1 | Ammadelle | Ammadelle | May 30, 1974 (#74001064) | Oxford; 34°22′21″N 89°31′06″W | Lafayette | Italianate villa built in 1859, designed by Calvert Vaux. |
| 2 | Anna Site | Anna Site | September 14, 1993 (#93001606) | Natchez; 31°41′43″N 91°20′59″W | Adams | A Plaquemine culture archaeological site. |
| 3 | Arlington | Arlington | May 30, 1974 (#73000999) | Natchez; 31°33′10″N 91°23′33″W | Adams | Early historic home. |
| 4 | Auburn | Auburn | May 30, 1974 (#74001047) | Natchez; 31°32′44″N 91°23′27″W | Adams | Early historic home. |
| 5 | Beauvoir | Beauvoir | November 7, 1993 (#71000448) | Biloxi; 30°23′33″N 88°51′46″W | Harrison | Post-war home and library of Confederate President Jefferson Davis, damaged by Hurricane Katrina in 2005, restored by 2008. |
| 6^{†} | Champion Hill Battlefield | Champion Hill Battlefield | May 5, 1977 (#71000450) | Bolton; 32°19′12″N 90°32′33″W | Hinds | A turning point of the American Civil War. |
| 7 | Commercial Bank and Banker's House | Commercial Bank and Banker's House | May 30, 1974 (#74002252) | Natchez; 31°33′41″N 91°24′19″W | Adams | Unusual dual-function building. |
| 8^{†} | Siege and Battle of Corinth Sites | Siege and Battle of Corinth Sites | May 6, 1991 (#91001050) | Corinth, MS and Hardeman County, TN; 34°56′02″N 88°31′19″W | Alcorn | Corinth battlefield - Corinth and Hardeman County, TN |
| 9 | Dancing Rabbit Creek Treaty Site | Dancing Rabbit Creek Treaty Site | June 19, 1996 (#73001024) | Macon; 33°00′36″N 88°45′15″W | Noxubee | Gathering place of Choctaw Indians, site of 1830 treaty leading to their relocation west of the Mississippi River. |
| 10 | Dunleith | Dunleith | December 2, 1974 (#72000684) | Natchez; 31°32′59″N 91°23′57″W | Adams | A Natchez mansion built in 1855. |
| 11 | Emerald Mound Site | Emerald Mound Site | December 29, 1989 (#88002618) | Stanton; 31°38′10″N 91°14′50″W | Adams | A Plaquemine culture archaeological site. |
| 12 | Medgar and Myrlie Evers Home National Monument | Medgar and Myrlie Evers Home National Monument | February 16, 2017 (#100000791) | Jackson; 32°20′27″N 90°12′45″W | Hinds | Home of civil rights activist Medgar Evers. |
| 13 | William Faulkner House | William Faulkner House | May 23, 1968 (#68000028) | Oxford; 34°21′35″N 89°31′29″W | Lafayette | Well-preserved mansion where author William Faulkner lived and wrote. |
| 14 | Fort St. Pierre Site | Fort St. Pierre Site | July 19, 1964 (#00000263) | Vicksburg; 32°29′44″N 90°47′55″W | Warren | Site of French fort during 1719-1729, important for use in dating other archaeological sites due to its integrity and brief period of use. |
| 15 | Grand Village of the Natchez | Grand Village of the Natchez | July 19, 1964 (#66000408) | Natchez; 31°31′31″N 91°22′54″W | Adams | Village and archaeological site of the Plaquemine culture and their descendants the Natchez . |
| 16 | Hester Site | | January 3, 2001 (#75001051) | Amory | Monroe | Archaeological site, a campsite used by Paleo-Indian and Archaic peoples in 9000-7000 BC. |
| 17 | Highland Park Dentzel Carousel | Highland Park Dentzel Carousel | February 27, 1987 (#87000863) | Meridian; 32°22′28″N 88°43′05″W | Lauderdale | German-American built carousel within Highland Park. |
| 18 | Holly Bluff Site | Holly Bluff Site | July 19, 1964 (#66000412) | Holly Bluff; 32°48′51″N 90°40′59″W | Yazoo | A Plaquemine Mississippian culture archaeological site. |
| 19 | House on Ellicott's Hill | House on Ellicott's Hill | May 30, 1974 (#74001050) | Natchez; 31°33′48″N 91°24′14″W | Adams | NRHP 74001050 |
| 20 | Jaketown Site | Jaketown Site | December 14, 1990 (#73001017) | Belzoni; 33°14′14″N 90°29′13″W | Humphreys | An archaeological site. |
| 21 | Lucius Q. C. Lamar House | Lucius Q. C. Lamar House | May 15, 1975 (#75001048) | Oxford; 34°22′17″N 89°30′58″W | Lafayette | NRHP 75001048 |
| 22 | Longwood | Longwood | December 16, 1969 (#69000079) | Natchez; 31°32′12″N 91°24′17″W | Adams | Unfinished antebellum house. |
| 23^{†} | Lyceum-The Circle Historic District | Lyceum-The Circle Historic District | October 6, 2008 (#08001092) | Oxford; 34°21′58″N 89°32′06″W | Lafayette | District associated with events surrounding the historic court-ordered admission of James Meredith to the University of Mississippi in 1962 |
| 24 | Charles McLaran House | Charles McLaran House | January 3, 2001 (#76001102) | Columbus; 33°29′24″N 88°25′54″W | Lowndes | Greek Revival mansion. |
| 25 | Melrose | Melrose | May 30, 1974 (#74002253) | Natchez; 31°32′35″N 91°22′59″W | Adams | Home within Natchez National Historical Park that achieves "perfection" in Greek Revival design. |
| 26 | Mississippi Governor's Mansion | Mississippi Governor's Mansion | April 24, 1975 (#69000085) | Jackson; 32°18′00″N 90°11′00″W | Hinds | Together with Old Mississippi State Capitol, designed by William Nichols. |
| 27 | Mississippi State Capitol | Mississippi State Capitol | October 31, 2016 (#69000086) | Jackson; 32°17′58″N 90°10′49″W | Hinds | Notable among state capitols for its unity of design and construction, having been built by a single general contracting firm within a single three-year construction program. |
| 28 | Monmouth | Monmouth | June 7, 1988 (#73001001) | Natchez; 31°33′17″N 91°23′09″W | Adams | NRHP 73001001 |
| 29 | I. T. Montgomery House | I. T. Montgomery House | May 11, 1976 (#76001092) | Mound Bayou; 33°52′31″N 90°43′44″W | Bolivar | Former slave Isaiah Montgomery founded successful all-black town here in 1887. |
| 30 | Oakland Memorial Chapel | Oakland Memorial Chapel | May 11, 1976 (#74001057) | Alcorn; 31°52′33″N 91°08′23″W | Claiborne | One of the oldest buildings on Alcorn University campus, the first land grant university for black Americans. It is located within Alcorn State University Historic District. |
| 31 | Old Mississippi State Capitol | Old Mississippi State Capitol | December 14, 1990 (#69000087) | Jackson; 32°17′58″N 90°10′49″W | Hinds | Greek Revival building. |
| 32 | Pemberton's Headquarters | Pemberton's Headquarters | December 8, 1976 (#70000319) | Vicksburg; 32°20′55″N 90°52′42″W | Warren | Confederate General Pemberton's HQ during 47-day siege of Vicksburg, where he decided to surrender the city on July 4, 1863. |
| 33 | Port Gibson Battle Site | | April 5, 2005 (#05000461) | Port Gibson; 31°57′28″N 91°01′08″W | Claiborne | American Civil War site of Battle of Port Gibson. |
| 34 | Rocket Propulsion Test Complex | Rocket Propulsion Test Complex | October 3, 1985 (#85002805) | Bay St. Louis; 30°21′50″N 89°35′14″W | Hancock | built in 1965, played an important role in the development of the Saturn V rocket. |
| 35 | Rosalie | Rosalie | January 19, 1989 (#77000781) | Natchez; 31°33′34″N 91°24′30″W | Adams | An 1823 Natchez mansion that influenced architecture throughout the Lower Mississippi Valley. |
| 36 | Stanton Hall | Stanton Hall | May 30, 1974 (#74002254) | Natchez; 31°33′45″N 91°24′03″W | Adams | |
| 37 | Warren County Courthouse | Warren County Courthouse | May 23, 1968 (#68000029) | Vicksburg; 32°21′01″N 90°52′43″W | Warren | NRHP 68000029 |
| 38 | Waverley | Waverley | May 30, 1974 (#73001004) | West Point; 33°34′09″N 88°30′13″W | Clay | |
| 39 | Eudora Welty House | Eudora Welty House | August 18, 2004 (#02001388) | Jackson; 32°19′08″N 90°10′13″W | Hinds | Home of author Eudora Welty |
| 40 | Winterville Site | Winterville Site | September 14, 1993 (#73001031) | Greenville; 33°29′09″N 91°03′40″W | Washington | A Plaquemine culture archaeological site. |

== Former NHLs in Mississippi ==
There have been no de-designations of Mississippi NHLs, but one NHL object has been moved out of the state and was subsequently delisted:

| | Landmark name | Image | Date designated | Date withdrawn | Locality | County | Description |
|---|---|---|---|---|---|---|---|
| 1 | President (Steamboat) | | December 20, 1989 | July 13, 2011 | Vicksburg | Warren | This steamboat plied the Mississippi River watershed after her construction in 1924. In 2009 she was disassembled and transported overland to St. Elmo, Illinois. This loss of historical integrity prompted the National Park Service to withdraw her landmark designation. |

== National Park Service areas in Mississippi ==
National Historic Parks, National Battlefields, and certain other areas listed in the National Park system are historic landmarks of national importance that are highly protected already, often before the inauguration of the NHL program in 1960, and are then often not also named NHLs per se. There are five of these in Mississippi. The National Park Service lists these five together with the NHLs in the state. They are:

| | Landmark name | Image | Date established | Location | County | Description |
|---|---|---|---|---|---|---|
| 1 | Brices Cross Roads National Battlefield Site | Brices Cross Roads battlefield site | | | | |
| 2 | Natchez National Historical Park | Melrose | | | | |
| 3 | Shiloh National Military Park | Union Cemetery | | | | (shared with Tennessee) |
| 4 | Tupelo National Battlefield | Tupelo National Battlefield Monument | | | | |
| 5 | Vicksburg National Military Park | Illinois Memorial | | | | Includes Vicksburg National Cemetery; shared with Louisiana. |

== See also ==
- National Register of Historic Places listings in Mississippi
- List of National Historic Landmarks by state
- List of National Natural Landmarks in Mississippi
