= Philander Smith (disambiguation) =

Philander Smith may refer to:

- Philander Smith University, a historically black college in Arkansas, United States
- Philander Smith (1809–1882), American real estate developer and philanthropist, namesake of the University
- Philander Smith (Mississippi) (1765–1824), colonial-era settler of the Natchez District
