= Aaron Burr Oaks =

Landmark grove, Mississippi

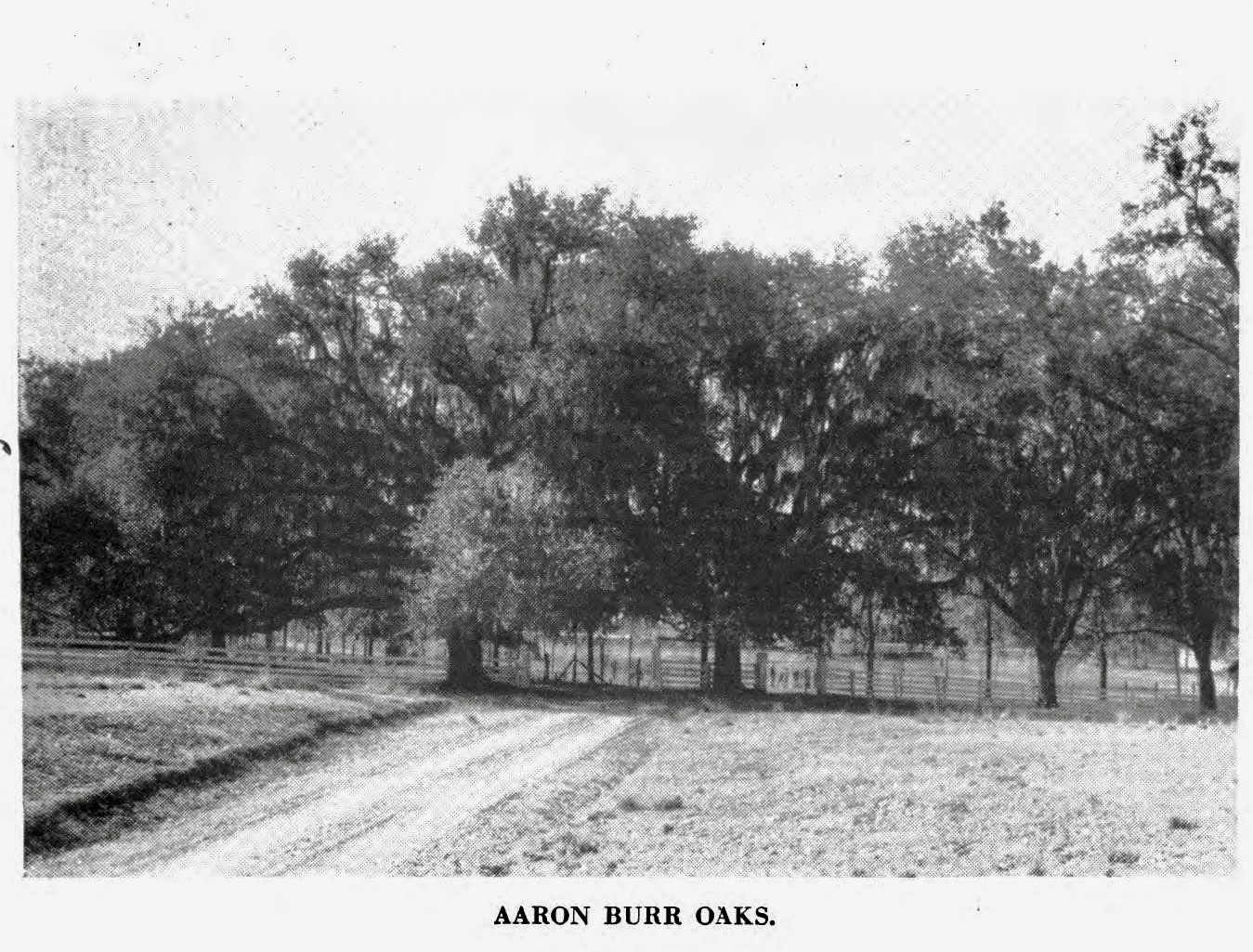
Aaron Burr Oaks photographed c. 1938

The Aaron Burr Oaks are a grove of oak trees on the campus of the now-defunct Jefferson College in Adams County, Mississippi, United States.

== Description ==
They were the site where judges Thomas Rodney and Peter Bryan Bruin held a grand jury inquest (noted nabob Philander Smith was the foreperson) into the conspiracy and treason charges against Aaron Burr in 1807. One of the oaks may have been known as the Mississippi Charter Oak, and a church nearby that had been planted by preacher Lorenzo Dow was the site of the first Mississippi territorial legislature to meet at Washington, Mississippi. Major John Holbrook drilled Jefferson College cadets nearby and his students reportedly exhumed his body when he died and reburied it near these trees, as per his express wishes during his lifetime.
