= Union Church, Mississippi =

- Unincorporated community
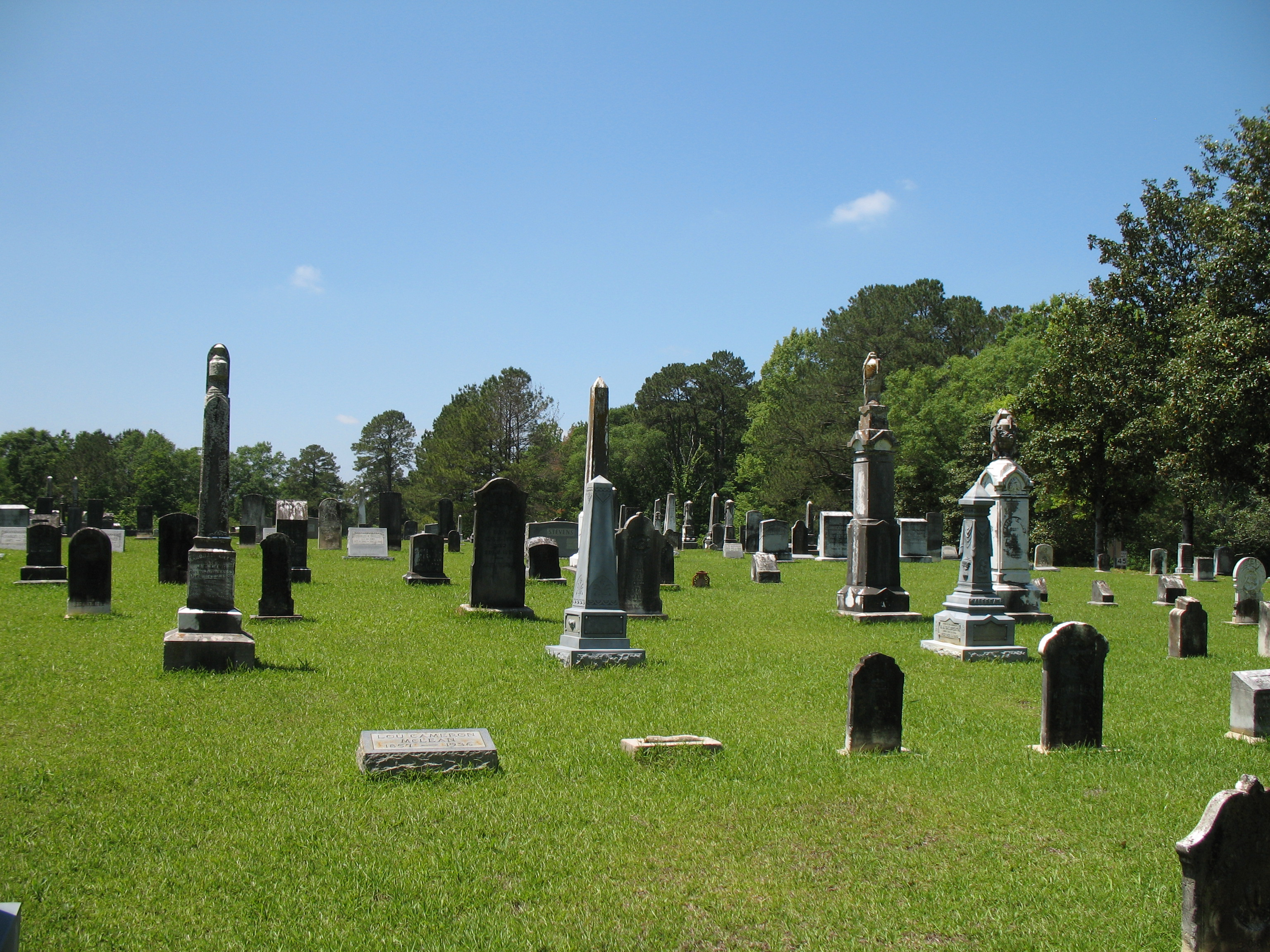
- Union Church Cemetery, Union Church (Jefferson County), Mississippi

- Location within Mississippi Location within the United States
- Coordinates: 31°40′59″N 90°47′15″W
- Country: United States
- State: Mississippi
- County: Jefferson
- Elevation: 479 ft (146 m)
- Time zone: UTC-6 (Central (CST))
  - Summer (DST): UTC-5 (CDT)
- Zip code: 39668
- Area codes: 601 & 769
- GNIS feature ID: 695045

Union Church is an unincorporated community located in Jefferson County, Mississippi, United States. It was a settlement of Scottish people.

== History ==
The community of Union Church was formed primarily by a group of Scotch settlers who left North Carolina around 1805 for the promise of fertile land to be farmed on the eastern banks of the Mississippi River. The town was originally called Scotch Settlement. The founding families were headed by George Torrey, his son Dougald Torrey, Laughlin Currie and Robert Willis.

A post office first began operating under the name Union Church in 1842.

On April 28, 1863, Grierson's Raid was checked in a skirmish at Union Church.

== Churches ==
The community's name bears witness to its history as a "union" of two church congregations. While most of the earliest settlers were Presbyterians, there were a few Methodist families, who, lacking resources to start their own church, worshipped in union with the Presbyterians. There are a number of small country churches in and around Union Church proper, but below are a few of the key congregations in the community's history.

=== Union Church Presbyterian Church ===
The Union Church Presbyterian Church, the third oldest Presbyterian church in the state of Mississippi, was formally organized on March 2, 1817 by Reverend Joseph Bullen, although he began preaching to the community around 1810 or 1811. The first church building was a small log house located about 3 miles from the current church building, on the property of the Buie family, who were founding members of both the church and the town. Some years later, an old Irishman, having no descendants, donated 100 acres to his church, on which the second building was erected. When the congregation outgrew this building, the present sanctuary was built and dedicated by Reverend Angus McCallum in 1852, and the Presbyterians worship there to this day.

=== Hickory Block United Methodist Church ===
Hickory Block is the oldest African American church in the community, believed to have been founded shortly after the close of the Civil War. Prior to that time, many of its members were baptized into the faith to become members in full communion with the Presbyterian Church. There were two services held at the Presbyterian Church on Sundays; a morning service for the white members, and an afternoon service for the servants. Presbyterian Church membership records list by name a number of the "servants" of white church members, baptized into membership between the years 1827 and 1864. Many of the names recorded in those rolls can be found on headstones in the Hickory Block cemetery today. Hickory Block still has an actively worshiping congregation today. It is likely that after receiving emancipation, the black members chose to form their own congregation at Hickory Block.

=== Galatia United Methodist Church ===
Galatia Methodist Church was established in 1859. The Methodists worshiped in the original wooden structure until 2003, when the congregation was officially dissolved due to declining membership.

=== Union Church Baptist Church ===
The Baptist Church was established in 1922, in its original white wooden structure. A new building was erected nearby in 1995, where an active congregation still worships.

== Education ==
In its heyday, Union Church had a grammar school along with an agricultural high school, complete with dormitories, which housed students from mostly nearby communities. The school was established in 1910 and had a working dairy, and an agriculture/shop building. One of the dormitories and the main school building burned. The main school building was reconstructed and burned again prior to its closing in 1955. Part of the school land was acquired by the Presbyterian Church, along with the cafeteria/auditorium, which was used by the community for meetings, etc. In the early 1970s the cafeteria/auditorium was burned by a vagrant who had stayed the night in the auditorium, and started a fire on the heart pine floor in an attempt to warm himself before moving on. The only school building currently remaining was purchased, along with 20 acres, by a native resident and a 1953 graduate of Union Church High School, W.H. "Billy" Covington. He purchased the agriculture building and the remaining dormitory in March 1959, soon after his marriage to Veta Smith Covington. They razed the remaining dormitory, using the material to build four houses in the local area, and remodeled the agriculture structure into a Greek Revival/Colonial style home in 1971, where they reared four sons, and currently reside there today.

== Notable people ==
- Moses "Whispering" Smith, blues harmonicist and singer.
