= Waterman Crane =

Early Mississippi colonist (1761–1826)

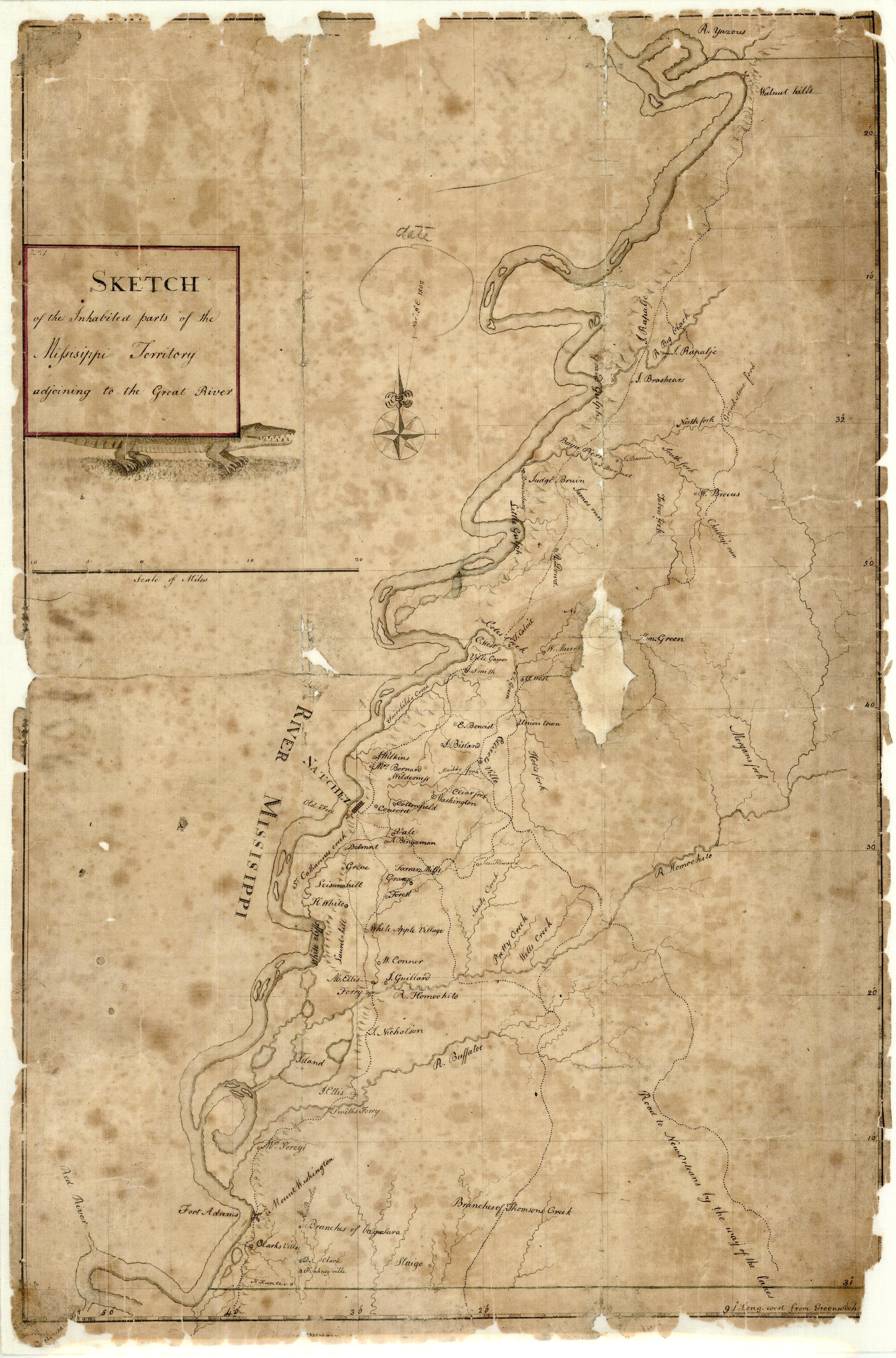
- Natchez District, 1802
- Born: c. 1761; Nova Scotia (?) Connecticut??
- Died: February 1826; Claiborne County, Mississippi

Waterman Crane (c. 1761 – February 1826) was an early colonist of Mississippi in North America. He settled in Bruinsburg, West Florida, in what later became Claiborne County, Mississippi, United States.

== Biography ==
He was originally from Halifax, Nova Scotia. The 1854 history of Mississippi by B. L. C. Wailes, citing Calvin Smith, suggests that Crane arrived during the British West Florida period, as "The large British grant to Lyman of twenty thousand acres was confiscated, but upon application to Grand Pré, the sale of one-half of the tract was arrested, and it was granted to Salome, the daughter of Thaddeus Lyman, left destitute in the country with her grandfather Waterman Crane." When Spanish West Florida became the Mississippi Territory in 1798, Crane swore an oath of allegiance to the United States.

On December 5, 1809, he was one of the organizers of "the school on the fork of Bayou Pierre, in the neighborhood of Port Gibson, under the direction of Henry C. Cox, was erected into an academy, under the name of Madison Academy."

He was a member of Bethel Presbyterian Church. According to a history of Presbyterianism in Mississippi, "The second Presbyterian Church organized in the Mississippi Territory was in the Bayou Pierre settlement, two and a half or three miles southwest from Port Gibson, where the missionaries had established a preaching station. It was organized by Rev. Joseph Bullen and Rev. James Smylie in 1807. The church was called Bayou Pierre and among the families composing its membership we find the names of Waterman Crane and Alexander Armstrong, the last of whom became the first elder in the Port Gibson Church. This church at a later date was dissolved because it was more convenient for some of the members to attend the church at Port Gibson, and for others to attend a second 'Bethel' church, which had been organized in Claiborne County east of Petit Gulf or Rodney, not far from Oakland College." This church played in a role in the founding of the Scotch settlement of Gaelic-speaking Presbyterians in Jefferson County, Mississippi: The colony was established in 1806 when immigrants from the Highlands of Scotland by way of North Carolina inquired with Judge Peter Bryan Bruin of Bayou Pierre about the prospects for settling in Natchez, in what was then Mississippi Territory. One of the visitors, Dugald Torrey, found Bruin in the company of Waterman Crane and a Presbyterian minister he knew from North Carolina known as Rev. Mr. Brown.

According to the Goodspeed history published 1891:

Like the majority of the early settlers he was compelled to undergo many hardships and privations, wore homespun clothing and attended religious services in private houses, or in "God's first temples, the groves." Wild game of various kinds roamed the woods at will, and Mr. Crane became quite a noted hunter...Two of Mr. Crane's sons were killed by the Indians. He was a member of the first board of supervisors of the county, and was noted for his hospitality over a wide extent of territory...The old settlers speak very highly of Waterman Crane, many of whom spent their first night in his house on coming to the territory of Mississippi. He is closely related to many of the first families of the county by the marriage of his sons and daughters.

According to one history of Claiborne County, residents Waterman Crane and William R. Buck "received swords for marked gallantry in the War of 1812."

He was married to Catherine Brashear (1764–1830). Waterman and Catherine Crane are buried in a small family cemetery "somewhere west of Port Gibson, and north of Rodney Road, on a bluff overlooking the Bayou Pierre lowlands."
