= List of impeachment investigations of United States federal judges =

Impeachment is the procedure in which a legislative body, like the United States Congress, can punish or remove government officials from their positions. This is a way for the legislative branch to check and balance the executive and judicial branches and police itself as well. As of December 2019, there have been 66 federal judges or Supreme Court Justices investigated for impeachment. Usually, misbehavior is brought to the attention of a legislator, who may call upon the United States House Committee on the Judiciary to investigate. After a review of its findings, in which case, the entire House takes on the role of grand jury and votes an indictment for “high crimes and misdemeanors". If a majority of the members of the United States House of Representatives vote to impeach, the impeachment is referred to the United States Senate for an impeachment trial. A conviction requires a two-thirds vote in the Senate. The individual may or may not then stand trial in a criminal court as well, before a jury of his peers. While the two procedures can occur together, they never have. In the criminal trial the individual may be punished with fines and/or incarceration.

For a period of nearly 40 years after World War II, the impeachment clause of the United States Constitution was considered moribund. A number of federal judges were targeted for primarily ideological reasons or that of personal malice by U.S. Representatives and these were always "filed away" by the House Judiciary Committee with no further action.

Prior to 2025, only the attempts to impeach Justice William O. Douglas and a scandal in Oklahoma made it to the hearing stage. What might have become serious impeachment proceedings, those against Supreme Court Justice Abe Fortas and Appeals Court Judge Otto Kerner, was followed by the target's immediate resignation before any formal proceedings could actually begin. The Judicial Councils Reform and Judicial Conduct and Disability Act of 1980 empowered the Judicial Conference of the United States to investigate and police the judiciary and, if need be, request that the House of Representatives impeach federal judges. Judicial councils are established in each circuit and investigate complaints and may certify the disability of judges or refer complaints to the Judicial Conference. Most judicial impeachments since then have been based on these requests.

== 18th century ==
=== George Turner – Northwest Territory ===
On May 10, 1796, the House received a report from the Attorney General on the conduct of George Turner a judge in the Northwest Territory, which included demands for bribes, and the wanton levy of fines without trial. The report was referred to a select committee for further action. On February 16, 1797, Judge Turner requested that a hearing on any potential charges be conducted while he was in town. His request was not granted. Then on February 27, Representative Theophilus Bradbury of Massachusetts submitted the select committee report and a resolution recommending a hearing be held in the Northwest Territory.

This resolution was tabled by the House. However Judge Turner resigned just a few months later.

== 19th century ==
=== John Pickering – District of New Hampshire ===
On February 4, 1803, the House received a report from President Jefferson regarding the conduct of Judge John Pickering of the District of New Hampshire. A select committee was appointed to investigate the matter and submitted its report to the House on February 18. On March 2, the House passed a resolution impeaching Judge Pickering. On October 20, the House appointed a select committee to draft articles of impeachment. The select committee submitted four articles of impeachment to the House on December 27, and on December 30, articles were formally adopted. The Senate began the impeachment trial against Judge Pickering on January 4, 1804.

On March 12, 1804, the Senate convicted Judge Pickering on all four articles and removed him from office.

=== Samuel Chase – United States Supreme Court ===
On January 5, 1804, a resolution was introduced appointing a select committee to investigate U.S. Supreme Court Associate Justice Samuel Chase. The resolution was approved on January 7, 1804. The select committee recommended impeachment in a report submitted to the House on March 6, 1804. On March 13, 1804, the report was approved and a select committee was appointed to draft the impeachment articles.

The House adopted the select committee's eight articles on March 26, 1804, one of which involved Chase's handling of the trial of John Fries. Two more focused on his conduct in the political libel trial of James Callender. Four articles focused on procedural errors made during Chase's adjudication of various matters, and an eighth was directed to his "intemperate and inflammatory (…) peculiarly indecent and unbecoming (…) highly unwarrantable (…) highly indecent" remarks while "charging" or authorizing a Baltimore grand jury. The Democratic-Republican-controlled United States Senate began the impeachment trial of Chase in early 1805, with Vice President Aaron Burr presiding.

All the counts involved Chase's work as a trial judge in lower circuit courts. In that era, Supreme Court justices had the added duty of serving as individuals on circuit courts, a practice that was ended in the late 19th century. The heart of the allegations was that political bias had led Chase to treat defendants and their counsel in a blatantly unfair manner. Chase's defense lawyers called the prosecution a political effort by his Democratic-Republican enemies. In answer to the articles of impeachment, Chase argued that all of his actions had been motivated by adherence to precedent, judicial duty to restrain advocates from improper statements of law, and considerations of judicial efficiency.

The Senate voted to acquit Chase of all charges on March 1, 1805. He returned to his duties on the court. He is the only U.S. Supreme Court Justice to have been impeached.

The acquittal of Chase – by lopsided margins on several of the counts – is believed to have helped ensure that an independent federal judiciary would survive partisan challenge. As Chief Justice William Rehnquist noted in his book, Grand Inquests, some people expressed opinions at the time of Chase's trial that the Senate had absolute latitude in convicting a jurist it found unfit, but the acquittal set an unofficial precedent that judges would not be impeached based on their performance on the bench. All judges impeached since Chase have been accused of outright criminality.

=== Richard Peters – District of Pennsylvania ===
On January 6, 1804, Judge Peters of the District of Pennsylvania was added, by amendment, to a resolution calling for the investigation of Justice Chase. The resolution was adopted on January 7, 1804. The select committee appointed to conduct the investigation submitted its report to the House on March 6, 1804.

The select committee report, exonerating Judge Peters of any wrongdoing, was adopted by the House on March 12.

=== Harry Innes – District of Kentucky ===
On March 21, 1808, a resolution to investigate Harry Innes of the District of Kentucky was introduced to the United States House of Representatives. The resolution was tabled. On March 31, 1808, they tried again and it was adopted by the House.

A select committee was appointed to conduct the investigation, and it submitted a report, absolving the Judge of all wrongdoing, to the House on April 19, 1808.

=== Peter Bruin – Mississippi Territory ===
On April 9, 1808, At the request of the territorial legislature, Mississippi delegate George Poindexter introduced a resolution calling for the appointment of a special committee to prepare articles of impeachment against Presiding Judge Peter Bruin of the Mississippi Territory. The resolution was tabled. On April 18, the resolution was reconsidered and a special committee, chaired by Poindexter, was appointed to investigate the Judge., who was charged with "neglect of duty and drunkenness on the bench."

Bruin resigned on October 12, 1808, as a consequence of the investigation. The House terminated impeachment proceedings, and Bruin died in 1827.

=== Harry Toulmin – Mississippi Territory ===
On December 19, 1811, as a result of an accusatory letter from Judge Harry Toulmin's district (the Washington District of the Mississippi Territory), a resolution was introduced to investigate the judge's conduct. The resolution was tabled. On December 21, 1811, the resolution was withdrawn, and the original accusatory letter of December 16, 1811, was referred to a select committee for further inquiry.

On January 14, 1812, an attempt to disband the investigating select committee was voted down. The select committee submitted a report absolving Judge Toulmin on May 22, 1812. The report was adopted by the House. Then on January 2, 1817, another letter was read before the House outlining charges of misconduct against Judge Toulmin. The letter was referred to the Judiciary Committee for further investigation.

On February 27, 1817, the Judiciary Committee issued a report finding no evidence to support impeachment. The report was adopted by the House, and the Judiciary Committee was disbanded.

=== Van Ness and Tallmadge – Southern District of New York ===
On April 10, 1818, a resolution was introduced requesting that a special committee be appointed to investigate Judges William P. Van Ness and Matthias B. Tallmadge of the Southern District of New York. The resolution was adopted by the House. Both had been charged with not doing any work. Talmage, claimed that he had so much paperwork left over by his predecessor that he had no time to do anything else, and that his health was so delicate that he needed a long vacation.

On February 17, 1819, the special committee submitted a report to the House recommending no action be taken against either Judge.

=== William Stephens – District of Georgia ===
On April 10, 1818, a special committee was appointed to investigate William Stephens of the District of Georgia.

Judge Stevens resigned during the House investigation, and on November 24, the special committee was disbanded.

=== Charles Tait – Circuit Court, Alabama ===
On March 6, 1822, a complaint against Charles Tait of the District of Alabama was received by the House and referred to the Judiciary Committee. A second complaint was presented on December 27. Mr. Moore then proposed a resolution referring the complaint to the Judiciary Committee for further action. Id. at 465. The resolution was adopted. Id. at 468. On January 28, 1823, the Judiciary Committee submitted a report exonerating Judge Tait. No action was taken before the end of the Congressional Session.

On January 26, 1824, the House received another complaint against Judge Tait. This complaint was tabled.

=== Joseph L. Smith – Supreme Court, Territory of Florida ===
On February 3, 1825, Richard K. Call, Delegate from Florida introduced a resolution calling for the Judiciary Committee to investigate Judge Joseph Lee Smith of the Florida Territory's Supreme Court on the charge that he took bribes and kickbacks. The resolution was adopted.

The investigation went on for years, with the last reference to it being in 1830.

=== Buckner Thruston – Circuit Court, DC ===
Circuit Court Judge John Ness sent a memorial to Congress complaining of D.C. Circuit Court Judge Buckner Thruston's official conduct. The memorial was referred to the Judiciary Committee for investigation. On February 28, 1825, the Judiciary Committee submitted its report to the House.

The report recommended no action be taken against the Judge.

On January 30, 1837, William Brent and Richard Coxe sent another memorial to Congress requesting an investigation of Judge Thruston, who was reputed to be a nasty individual and bad judge. The memorial was referred to the Judiciary Committee. On March 3, 1837, the Judiciary Committee submitted its final report to the House. The report contained witness testimony, but no recommendation for or against impeachment.

No other record regarding the disposition of this report has been found in primary or secondary sources. Presumably, no action was taken before the end of the congressional session.

=== Alfred Conkling – Northern District of New York ===
Martha Bradstreet sent a petition to Congress requesting an investigation of Judge Conkling. The petition was referred to the Judiciary Committee to conduct the investigation. On April 3, 1830, the Judiciary Committee submitted its report to the House.

The report recommended no action be taken against Judge Conkling.

A second set of complaints from citizens of New York was submitted to Congress and referred to the Judiciary Committee for investigation. On March 3, 1841, the Judiciary Committee submitted its report to the House.

The report recommended no action be taken against Judge Conkling.

On August 8, 1848, a third memorial requesting an investigation was sent to Congress by Anson Little. The memorial was presented to the House on January 3, 1849, and referred to the Judiciary Committee for further investigation. On February 13, 1849, the Judiciary Committee submitted its report to the House, The report recommended a full investigation of Judge Conkling, who among other things had presided over a lawsuit he had instigated against another party, be conducted by the next Congress.

No action was taken by the next Congress.

=== James H. Peck – District of Missouri ===
On March 23, 1830, Mr. Buchanon presented a report from the Judiciary Committee recommending that Judge Peck be impeached. On April 21, 1830, debate on the Judiciary Committee report began in the House. Id. at 810. An impeachment resolution was adopted on April 24, 1830.

On April 24, 1830, a select committee was formed to draft the articles of impeachment Five days later, the select committee submitted impeachment articles to the House. On May 1, 1830, the House voted to adopt the articles as presented. That same day, five managers were appointed to prosecute the impeachment before the Senate. On December 13, 1830, the Senate began the impeachment trial.

The trial continued through January 31, 1831, when the Senate voted to acquit Judge Peck.

=== Benjamin Johnson – Arkansas Territory Superior Court ===
William Cummins sent a memorial to Congress requesting an investigation of Judge Johnson. The memorial was referred to the Judiciary Committee for further action. On February 8, 1833, the Judiciary Committee submitted its report to the House: The report found no evidence to support impeachment. The Judiciary Committee also concluded that a territorial judge was not a civil officer subject to impeachment. The Judiciary Committee then recommended no further action be taken against Judge Johnson.

=== Philip K. Lawrence – Eastern District of Louisiana ===
On January 8, 1839, the House received a petition from Duncan Hennan requesting an investigation of Judge Lawrence. The petition was referred to a select committee for further action. On February 11, the select committee submitted its report, The report recommended Judge Lawrence be impeached.

No action was taken, and the Judge remained on the bench until he died in 1841.

=== John C. Watrous – District of Texas ===
On Feb. 13, 1851, a memo requesting an investigation of Judge Watrous was presented to Congress. The memo, which accused the judge of appearing before himself in court among other things, was referred to the Judiciary Committee. On March 3, the Judiciary Committee submitted its report to the House, which recommended the Judiciary Committee be discharged from further consideration because insufficient time remained in the Congressional Session to complete the investigation. A second memo containing charges against Judge Watrous was sent to the House and referred to the Judiciary Committee. On February 28, 1853, the Judiciary Committee submitted its report to the House. The report recommended impeaching the Judge, but it didn't happen.

Another investigation of Judge Watrous was conducted in the 34th Congress. On February 9, 1857, the Judiciary Committee submitted its report recommending Judge Watrous be impeached. However, no further action was taken until January 15, 1858, when a resolution was introduced allowing the Judiciary Committee to further investigate the matter by calling witnesses. The resolution was adopted by the House.

On December 9, 1858, the Judiciary Committee submitted two reports to the House. The majority report recommended Judge Watrous be impeached. The minority, however, found insufficient evidence to warrant impeachment. On December 15, 1858, by a vote of 111 to 97 refused to impeach, finding insufficient evidence to justify the action. This was one of the very few times that the Full House has refused to impeach a Judge after the House Judiciary Committee has recommended a trial in the Senate.

They tried again in 1860, and again the House Judiciary Committee voted out articles of impeachment. However, Texas had seceded from the Union by this time, and in any case the House never got around to it by the time it expired on March 4, 1861.

=== Thomas Irwin – Western District of Pennsylvania ===
During the 35th Congress, 2nd Session, the Judiciary Committee conducted an investigation of Judge Irwin. On January 13, 1859, a resolution authorizing witnesses to be called was adopted by the House.

On January 28, the Judiciary Committee informed the House that Judge Irwin had resigned, and the House voted to discharge the Judiciary Committee from further investigation.

=== West H. Humphreys – Eastern, Middle and Western Districts of Tennessee ===
On March 4, 1862, Rep. Bingham introduced a report from the Judiciary Committee recommending impeachment of Judge Humphreys (D), for publicly calling for secession, giving aid to an armed rebellion, conspiring with Jefferson Davis, serving as a Confederate judge, confiscating the property of Military Governor Andrew Johnson and U.S. Supreme Court Justice John Catron, and imprisoning a Union sympathizer with "intent to injure him. The report was recommitted to the Judiciary Committee. On May 6, 1862, the report was resubmitted to the House. This time the House adopted the committee report and impeached the Judge. On May 14, 1862, the House appointed a select committee to draft the articles of impeachment, and on May 19 the articles were adopted.

The Senate began the impeachment trial on June 26, 1862, and later that day voted to convict and remove Judge Humphreys from office.

=== Mark W. Delahay – District of Kansas ===
An impeachment investigation was conducted by a subcommittee of the House Judiciary Committee into judge Mark W. Delahay regarding conduct that included drunken behavior both on the bench and off the bench. Afterwards, on n February 28, 1873, Benjamin Butler of Massachusetts introduced a resolution to impeach Judge Delahay, citing his "improper personal habits." The resolution was immediately adopted by the House. On March 3, 1873, the Senate announced it was ready to receive the articles of impeachment. The special committee appointed to present the impeachment charges against the Judge then reported to the Senate and announced specific articles of impeachment would follow. Articles of impeachment were written, however they were not adopted and no trial was ever held, as the judge resigned after the House began impeachment proceedings.

=== Charles T. Sherman – Northern District of Ohio ===
On February 22, 1873, Rep. Roberts introduced a resolution to investigate Judge Sherman (R). The resolution was adopted and referred to the Judiciary Committee. and on March 3, the Judiciary Committee submitted a report recommending further investigation of him in the next Congress, and asking to be discharged from further consideration of the matter.

Rep. Potter attempted to persuade the House to consider an impeachment resolution instead of the committee report, but his attempt failed.

=== Richard Busteed – District of Alabama ===
On December 15, 1873, Mr. E. R. Hoar introduced a resolution to investigate Judge Busteed's conduct. The resolution was referred to the Judiciary Committee. 1 On December 17, 1873, the House passed a resolution granting subpoena power to the Judiciary Committee. On June 20, 1874, the Judiciary Committee submitted its report and resolutions for impeachment to the House. No action was taken before the end of the congressional session. Busteed resigned before the full House could vote on the recommendation. Representatives Butler and Wilson emphasized the revived (previously settled by Blount in 1799) but still-minority position that resignation was no bar to later impeachment, yet voted with the rest of the committee to terminate proceedings. On January 7, 1875, sometime after Judge Busteed's resignation, the House Judiciary Committee introduced a resolution calling for the Judge's impeachment.

The resolution did not pass. However, in the next (44th) Congress, a majority of House voted to impeach Belknap despite his having resigned.

=== Edward Durell – District of Louisiana ===
On December 17, 1873, Mr. Wilson introduced a resolution to investigate Judge Durell. The resolution was referred to the Judiciary Committee.

On January 7, 1875, following Judge Durell's resignation, Mr. Wilson made a motion to table the resolution and relieve the Judiciary Committee of its investigation. His motion carried.

=== William F. Story – Western District of Arkansas ===
On February 26, 1874, Rep. James G. Blaine introduced charges against William F. Story (R). These charges were referred to the Judiciary Committee, prompting Judge Story to resign.

The case was never heard of again.

=== Henry W. Blodgett – Northern District of West Virginia ===
On January 7, 1879, Rep. Harrison offered a resolution to investigate Judge Blodgett.). The resolution was referred to the Judiciary Committee.

On March 3, 1879, the Judiciary Committee reported back to the House, recommending no impeachment proceedings against Judge Blodgett. A resolution to table actions against the Judge was introduced and adopted by the House.

=== Samuel B. Axtell – New Mexico Territory Supreme Court ===
Samuel Axtell (D) was alleged to be the most corrupt politician in the Old West, appointed in 1882.

Chief Judge Axtell resigned in May 1885.

=== Alexander "Aleck" Boarman – Western District of Louisiana ===
On April 1, 1890, Rep. William C. Oates of Alabama introduced a resolution to impeach Judge Boarman was sent to the Judiciary Committee. No primary record of this resolution could be found. However, on February 17, 1891, the Judiciary Committee referred to this initial resolution when it introduced an impeachment resolution against the Judge. The House printed and recommitted the resolution to the Judiciary Committee. Two days later, the Judiciary Committee reintroduced a resolution to impeach Judge Boarman. The House agreed to consider the resolution on February 20 at 2:00 p.m. No such action was taken. So, on the 28th, the resolution was again called up for consideration. The vote on the resolution was postponed until the evening session of the House. Again, the intended action did not occur.

On January 30, 1892, the old impeachment resolution was tabled and a new resolution calling for further investigation of Judge Boarman was adopted and referred to the Judiciary Committee. The Judiciary Committee reported back to the House on June 1.

A resolution was passed discharging the Judiciary Committee from further action against the Judge, and the committee report and accompanying evidence was tabled.

=== James G. Jenkins – Seventh Circuit ===
On February 5, 1894, Mr. McGann introduced a resolution to investigate Judge Jenkins. The resolution was referred to the Judiciary Committee. 26 Cong. Rec. 1922 (1894). On March 2, 1894, the Judiciary Committee submitted a report recommending an investigation of the Judge. Id. at 2533–34. On March 6, 1894, Mr. Boatner introduced a resolution to adopt the committee report and to begin the investigation. The resolution was adopted by the House. Id. at 2629. On June 8, 1894, the Judiciary Committee submitted its report of the investigation to the House. The report was referred to the House Calendar. Id. at 5994

No other record regarding the disposition of this report has been found in primary or secondary sources. Presumably, no action was taken before the end of the congressional session.

=== Augustus Ricks – Northern District of Ohio ===
The Central Labor Union of Cleveland, Ohio, sent a memorial to Congress charging Judge Ricks (R) with professional misconduct. The memorial was referred to the Judiciary Committee for a preliminary investigation of the charges. On August 8, 1894, the Judiciary Committee submitted a report recommending a full investigation of Judge Ricks be conducted. No other record regarding the disposition of this report has been found in primary or secondary sources. Presumably, no action was taken before the end of the congressional session. On January 7, 1895, Mr. Johnson offered another resolution calling for an investigation into charges against Judge Ricks. The resolution was adopted and referred to the Judiciary Committee.

The Judiciary Committee recommended impeachment and reported its findings to the House on January 25, 1895. The committee report was referred to the House calendar and ordered printed.

==== Incomplete information ====
These were in the files of the House Judiciary Committee:

- James B. McPherson and James B. Holland Judges, Circuit Court, District of Pennsylvania
- E.S. Farrington Judge, District Court, Nevada
- A.S. Moore Judge of 2d Division, District Court of Alaska
- Ferdinand A. Geiger Judge, District Court, Eastern District of Wisconsin

== 20th century ==
=== Charles H. Swayne – Northern District of Florida ===
On December 10, 1903, Lamar presented a memorial from the Florida Legislature requesting an investigation of Judge Charles Swayne. The resolution was referred to the Judiciary Committee.

Swayne was impeached by the House of Representatives on December 13, 1904. He was accused of filing false travel vouchers, improper use of private railroad cars, unlawfully imprisoning two attorneys for contempt, and living outside of his district. Swayne's trial consumed two-and-a-half months before it ended on February 27, 1905, when the Senate voted acquittal on each of the twelve articles. There was little doubt that Swayne was guilty of some of the offenses charged against him. Indeed, his counsel admitted as much, though calling the lapses "inadvertent."

It was during the long Swayne trial that the suggestion first surfaced that a Senate committee, rather than the Senate as a whole, should receive impeachment evidence. Senator George F. Hoar of Massachusetts proposed that the presiding officer should appoint such a committee. Hoar's proposal would eventually be embodied in Rule XI of the Senate's impeachment rules. In 1905 the resolution was referred to the Rules Committee, which took no action.

The Senate refused to convict Swayne because its members did not believe his peccadilloes amounted to "high crimes and misdemeanors". Swayne thereafter continued serving on the court until his death, in 1907.

=== Lebbeus R. Wilfley – U.S. Court for China ===
In 1906, the U.S. Congress established a special court for the "district of China", based in the Shanghai International Settlement which had vice-regal powers of arrest and imprisonment. With only one judge, the former Attorney General of the Philippines, and no obligation to follow the strictures of the constitution or local law, there were many complaints by American expatriates, especially one by Lorrin A. Thurston, former Attorney General of the Territory of Hawaii, who charged that Judge Wilfley had voided a will by a person leaving some of his money to the Catholic Church because of his prejudice against it. On February 20, 1908, Representative George E. Waldo introduced articles of impeachment against Wilfley and the resolution was referred to the Judiciary Committee. Leaving the court in chaos, Wilfley traveled halfway around the world to attend the hearings in Washington, D.C.

On May 8, the Judiciary Committee submitted a report, H.R. Rep. No. 60-1626, to the House recommending against impeachment, but by the time Wilfley got back to Shanghai, the situation was so poisoned, he resigned and returned to the U.S. for good.

=== Cornelius H. Hanford – U.S. Circuit Judge, Western District of Washington ===
On June 7, 1912, Berger introduced a resolution to investigate Judge Cornelius H. Hanford. The resolution was referred to the Judiciary Committee.

Hanford resigned and the investigation ceased.

=== Robert W. Archbald – Third Circuit, Commerce Court ===
On 13 July 1912, Judge Archibald was impeached by the House of Representatives on 13 Articles by a vote of 223 to 1. Articles I, II, III and VI alleged that Archbald had entered into agreements with litigants at a substantial benefit to himself. Article IV alleged wrongful communication with litigants. Articles V, VII, VIII, IX and X alleged that he had improperly solicited and accepted gifts from litigants. Article XI alleged he had improperly solicited and accepted gifts from attorneys. Article XII alleged he allowed corrupt practices during jury selection. Article XIII alleged a general charge of bringing the Judiciary into disrepute. The offenses alleged in Articles I through XI were connected with holidays in Europe and other gifts received from coal mine workers and railroad officials.

On 16 July, the United States Senate began Archbald's trial. The Senate convicted him of five of the thirteen Articles on 13 January 1913. The Senate then voted to remove him from office and disqualify him from further office by a vote of 39 to 35.

The exact division on each Article is as follows:

	Yeas	Nays
Article I	68	5
Article II	46	25
Article III	60	11
Article IV	52	20

	Yeas	Nays
Article V	66	6
Article VI	24	45
Article VII	29	36
Article VIII	22	42

	Yeas	Nays
Article IX	23	39
Article X	1	65
Article XI	11	51
Article XII	19	46

	Yeas	Nays
Article XIII	42	20

Archbald was convicted on Articles I, III, IV, V and XIII and was accordingly removed from office. Article II gained a majority of votes, but not the two thirds necessary under the U.S. Constitution for conviction.

=== Emory Speer – Southern District of Georgia ===
On August 26, 1913, Rep. Clayton offered a resolution, H.R. Res. 234, to investigate Judge Speer. The resolution was referred to the Rules Committee. Id. at 3795. However, following an objection from the floor, the resolution was held over for consideration until August 27, 1913, at which time it was amended and adopted A Select Subcommittee of the Judiciary Committee conducted the investigation. On October 2, 1914, after reviewing the Subcommittee's findings, the Judiciary Committee submitted a report, to the House. The report was referred to the House Calendar.

The report, which recommended no further action be taken against Judge Speer, was considered and agreed to by the House on October 21.

=== Daniel Thew Wright – Supreme Court of the District of Columbia ===
On March 21, 1914, Mr. Park introduced an impeachment resolution, H.R. Res. 446, against Judge Wright. The resolution was referred to the Judiciary Committee. On April 10, 1914, the Judiciary Committee submitted a report, to the House. The report recommended further investigation and authorized the Judiciary Committee to use Subcommittees as needed. The report was adopted and referred to the Judiciary Committee for further action.

On March 3, 1915, the House agreed with the Judiciary Committee's final report recommending no further action, and discharged the Judiciary Committee from any further investigation of Judge Wright.

=== Alston G. Dayton – Northern District of West Virginia ===
On May 11, 1914, Mr. Neely introduced a resolution, H.R. Res. 512, calling for the investigation of Judge Dayton. The resolution was sent to the Rules Committee. On June 12, 1914, after no further action was taken, Mr. Neely introduced a second resolution, H.R. Res. 541, to investigate impeachment charges against the Judge. This resolution was also sent to the Judiciary Committee. On February 9, 1915, the report, of a Select Subcommittee of the House Judiciary Committee was considered by the House. The House followed the report's recommendation and adopted a resolution authorizing the Judiciary Committee to investigate the Judge. The Judiciary Committee then submitted its report, to the House on March 3, 1915.

The report, recommending no further action against Judge Dayton, was adopted.

=== Kenesaw Mountain Landis – Northern District of Illinois ===
In 1920 Judge Landis left the bench to become Commissioner of Baseball, but neglected to resign and continued to receive his salary, which offended many people. On February 2, 1921, Mr. Welty introduced a resolution, H.R. Res. 665, to investigate the conduct of Judge Landis. The resolution was referred to the Rules Committee. On February 14, 1921, Mr. Welty introduced actual impeachment charges against Judge Landis. These charges were referred to the House Judiciary Committee for investigation.

On March 2, 1921, the Judiciary Committee submitted a report, to the House, and it was referred to the House Calendar. The report recommended a complete investigation be undertaken by the 67th Congress. No action was taken before the end of the Congressional Session. However, on October 17, 1921, Judge Landis was condemned for his actions in a letter from the American Bar Association.

This condemnation letter was referred to the Senate Judiciary Committee.

=== William E. Baker – Northern District of West Virginia ===
On May 22, 1924, a resolution, H.R. Res. 325, to investigate Judge Baker was introduced. Some time earlier the Judiciary Committee had received information concerning misconduct by Judge Baker, and appointed a Subcommittee to review the material. After this review, the Subcommittee recommended a full-scale investigation. The resolution was adopted by the House and referred to the Judiciary Committee for further action. A Select Subcommittee of the House Judiciary Committee was given charge of the investigation. (There is record of the Select Subcommittee obtaining funding for a stenographer on June 7, 1924.) The final Judiciary Committee report, recommended against impeaching Judge Baker. The report by Mr. Dwyer was referred to the House Calendar on February 10, 1925.

No action was taken before the end of the congressional session.

=== George W. English – Eastern District of Illinois ===
On January 13, 1925, Mr. Hawes introduced a resolution, H.R. Res. 402, requesting the Judiciary Committee conduct an investigation of Judge English. The resolution was referred to the Rules Committee. Then on February 3, 1925, Mr. Snell made a motion to refer House Resolution 402 from the Rules Committee to the Judiciary Committee. The motion carried.

On February 10, 1925, Mr. Graham introduced a joint resolution, H.R.J. Res. 347, calling for an investigation of Judge English. The resolution was referred to the Judiciary Committee. The resolution was signed by the President on March 4, 1925. A special committee, consisting of members of the House Judiciary Committee, was then appointed to conduct the investigation. On December 19, 1925, the special committee submitted its report. The report was subsequently referred to the Judiciary Committee, which continued the investigation. Judge English testified before the Judiciary Committee on January 12, 1926.

On March 25, 1926, the Judiciary Committee submitted its report, H.R. Rep. No. 69-653, and articles of impeachment against Judge English. The next day a minority report was printed in the record. On March 30, 1926, the House began debate on the articles of impeachment. On April 1, 1926, the articles of impeachment were adopted. The Senate considered the articles of impeachment on April 23, 1926, and the impeachment trial began with Judge English's answer to the articles on May 3, 1926. House managers then requested time to prepare a response to Judge English. On March 5, 1926, the Senate set November 10 as the date for the trial to resume.

On December 11, 1926, the House took note of Judge English's resignation and requested the Senate drop the impeachment proceedings. The Senate accepted the House recommendation and ended the proceedings on December 13, 1926

John T. Rogers of St. Louis Post-Dispatch won the 1927 Pulitzer Prize for Reporting with his coverage of the inquiry leading to English's impeachment.

=== Frank Cooper – Northern District of New York ===
On January 28, 1927, Congressman Fiorello H. La Guardia brought impeachment charges against Judge Cooper. The charges were referred to the Judiciary Committee for investigation. On March 2, 1927, the Judiciary Committee submitted its report, H.R. Rep. No. 69-2299, recommending no impeachment action be taken against the Judge.

This report was referred to the House Calendar, and the next day a resolution, H.R. Res. 450, adopting the committee report and recommending no impeachment action be taken against the Judge, was passed by the House.

=== Grover Moscowitz – U.S. District Judge, Eastern District of New York ===
On March 4, 1929, a joint resolution, H.R.J. Res. 431, calling for the investigation of Judge Moscowitz was signed by the President. 70 Cong. Rec. 5227 (1929). The resolution created a Select Subcommittee of the House Judiciary Committee to conduct the investigation. Id. at 4839. Following this investigation, the Judiciary Committee submitted a report, H.R. Rep. No. 70-1106, to the House criticizing Judge Moscowitz, but refused to recommend impeachment.

No action was taken before the end of the congressional session.

=== Francis A. Winslow – Southern District of New York ===
On April 15, 1929, Congressman Fiorello H. La Guardia introduced a resolution, H.R. Res. 12, to investigate Judge Winslow. The resolution was referred to the Judiciary Committee. On December 20, 1929, the Judiciary Committee submitted a report, H.R. Rep. No. 71–84, recommending the investigation cease due to Judge Winslow's resignation.

A resolution, H.R. Res. 110, adopting the committee's report recommending the investigation cease due to Judge Winslow's resignation was passed by the House.

=== Harry Anderson – Western District of Tennessee ===
On March 12, 1930, La Guardia introduced a resolution, H.R. Res. 184, requesting that the Attorney General send the Judiciary Committee any available information on Judge Anderson's conduct. The resolution was sent to the Judiciary Committee. On June 2, 1930, a resolution from the Judiciary Committee, H.R. Res. 191, was introduced. The resolution called for a special committee, consisting of five members of the House Judiciary Committee, to be appointed to inquire into Judge Anderson's conduct. The resolution was referred to the "Committee of the Whole House on the State of the Union" and agreed to by the House on June 13, 1930.

On February 18, 1931, the Judiciary Committee submitted a report, H.R. Rep. No. 71-2714, of their findings, and introduced a resolution, H.R. Res. 362, stating insufficient grounds existed for impeachment. The resolution was adopted.

=== Harold Louderback – Northern District of California ===
On May 26, 1932, Congressman Fiorello H. La Guardia introduced a resolution, H.R. Res. 239, requesting a special committee be appointed to investigate Judge Louderback. The resolution was referred to the Judiciary Committee for further action. On May 31, 1932, the Judiciary Committee reported the resolution back to the House without amendment. Id. at 11,700. The resolution was adopted on June 9, 1932.

A special committee was appointed to conduct the investigation and report its findings to the Judiciary Committee. On February 17, 1933, the Judiciary Committee submitted a report, H.R. Rep. No. 72-2065, and a resolution, H.R. Res. 387, requesting the report be adopted. The report found insufficient evidence to warrant impeachment. On February 24, 1933, when the Judiciary Committee report came up for consideration, Mr. LaGuardia introduced the minority report which recommended Judge Louderback be impeached and included five articles of impeachment. With two conflicting reports to consider, a debate arose in the House between those supporting the majority report?s recommendation not to impeach, and those supporting the five articles of impeachment presented in the minority report. When the debate was over, the House agreed to adopt the minority report and its articles of impeachment. The Senate began its impeachment proceedings with Judge Louderback's answer on April 11, 1933. The actual impeachment trial started on May 15, 1933.

On May 24, 1933, the Senate acquitted Judge Louderback on all charges.

=== James Lowell – District of Massachusetts ===
On April 26, 1933, Mr. Smith introduced a resolution, H.R. Res. 120, authorizing the Judiciary Committee to investigate Judge Lowell. The resolution was adopted.

On November 30, 1933, during the investigation, Judge Lowell died.

=== Judge Lindley, James Wilkerson, and Judge Woodward – Northern District of Illinois ===
On June 12, 1933, Mr. Cellers introduced a resolution, H.R. Res. 145, to investigate the "matter of appointments, conduct, proceedings, and acts of receivers, trustees, and referees in bankruptcy." The resolution was referred to the Rules Committee for further action.

Some judges were implicated in the investigation, and their impeachment discussed, but were later exonerated.

=== Joseph Molyneaux – District of Minnesota ===
On January 22, 1934, Mr. Shoemaker introduced a resolution, H.R. Res. 233, authorizing the Judiciary Committee to investigate Judge Molyneaux. The resolution was adopted and referred to the Judiciary Committee. When no action was taken, Mr. Shoemaker introduced another resolution on April 20, 1934. This resolution contained impeachment charges against Judge Molyneaux, and was also referred to the Judiciary Committee.

Presumably, they died in committee.

=== Samuel Alschuler – Seventh Circuit ===
On May 7, 1935, Rep. Everett Dirksen offered a resolution, H.R. Res. 214, to investigate possible impeachment charges against Judge Alschuler. The resolution was referred to the Judiciary Committee. A week later, the House adopted a resolution, H.R. Res. 220, granting the Judiciary Committee authority to hold hearings.

=== Halsted L. Ritter – Southern District of Florida ===
On May 29, 1933, Congressman J. Mark Wilcox of Florida introduced resolution (H. Res. 163) authorizing the House Judiciary Committee to investigate the conduct of Judge Ritter (R) to "determine whether in the opinion of the committee he had been guilty of any high crime or misdemeanor." The resolution was referred to the Judiciary Committee.

On March 2, 1936, the House of Representatives voted to impeach Judge Ritter by 181 votes to 146 on seven articles of impeachment. The proceedings were only the 13th impeachment case in the 147 years of Congress, although it took place just a month after the impeachment of Harold Louderback (who was acquitted in the Senate). The seven articles were:

- Ordering the payment of "exorbitant" legal fees with intent to embezzle. Specifically, the House managers said Ritter engaged in champerty ("a proceeding whereby a person having no legitimate interest in a lawsuit abets it with money or services in the hope of profit") by "corruptly and unlawfully" receiving $4,500 from a former law partner, Albert L. Rankin. The House charged that Ritter had planned with Rankin and others to put Whitehall (the former Henry Morrison Flagler mansion and then a hotel, and now a museum) into receivership, and had given Rankin an "exorbitant fee" of $75,000, keeping $4,500 of it.
- Showing favoritism in bankruptcy cases
- Two charges of practicing law while a judge
- Two charges of tax evasion (by filed false income tax returns in 1929 and 1930)
- Bringing the judiciary into disrepute (accepting free meals and lodging at Whitehall during receivership proceedings)

Ritter's chief defense attorney was Frank P. Walsh. Three House managers prosecuted the case, with Sam Hobbs of Alabama leading. On April 6, 1936, the U.S. Senate began its trial. A motion to disqualify Ritter from all further federal office was defeated unanimously by the Senate. Eleven days after the trial began, the Senate voted to acquit him of all but the last article (bringing the judiciary into disrepute), which he was convicted of 56–28, exactly the two-thirds necessary for conviction under the Constitution.

Ritter was removed from office on April 17, 1936.

Ritter challenged the conviction in the federal Court of Claims on the grounds that the Senate could not convict him on a general charge of bringing the judiciary into disrepute if it was not able to convict him of a specific offense. The Court of Claims dismissed the case and held it did not have jurisdiction because the Senate was given the "sole power" to try impeachments under Clause 6, Section 3 of Article I of the United States Constitution.

=== Albert Johnson – Middle District of Pennsylvania ===
On February 15, 1945, a resolution, H.R. Res. 138, authorizing the Judiciary Committee to investigate impeachment charges against Judge Johnson (and Judge Watson, see below) was adopted by the House. The investigation of Judge Johnson was conducted at both the committee and subcommittee level. (Referenced in a speech by Richard Russell) .). On July 3, 1945, during the Judiciary Committee investigation, Judge Johnson resigned. On July 14, he was called to testify before the Judiciary Committee. Following a poor performance by the Judge during cross examination, the Judge relinquished his retirement salary and withdrew as a witness, thereby mooting the entire process.

The report of the House Judiciary Committee the following year stated that had Johnson not resigned, he would have definitely been impeached.

=== Albert L. Watson – Middle District of Pennsylvania ===
The House Judiciary Committee voted to end the impeachment investigation against Judge Watson on September 20, 1945, and he went on to serve until his death in the 1950s. This would be the last serious impeachment investigation for nearly a quarter-century.

=== William O. Douglas – United States Supreme Court ===
There were two attempts to remove Associate Justice William O. Douglas from office; both of them failed.

==== 1953 attempt ====
On June 17, 1953, infuriated by Douglas' brief stay of execution of Julius and Ethel Rosenberg, Rep. William McDonald Wheeler introduced a resolution, H.R. Res. 290, impeaching Justice Douglas. It was referred to the Judiciary Committee to investigate the charges. The next day, the Judiciary Committee appointed a Special Subcommittee to conduct the investigation. There was a hearing, and on July 7, the committee voted to end the investigation.

No further action was taken.

==== 1970 attempt ====
Justice Douglas was fully committed to his causes. However, because of difficult financial circumstances, he was also forced to maintain a busy speaking and publishing schedule to supplement his income. Never a wealthy man, Douglas became severely burdened financially due to a bitter divorce and settlement with his first wife. He only sank deeper into financial difficulties as settlements with his second and third wives essentially consumed his entire salary as an Associate Justice of the Supreme Court.

Douglas's steps to supplement his income as a result of his financial situation also included the unusual move of becoming president of the Parvin Foundation, established by the "Mob's Accountant" from the sale of the infamous Flamingo Hotel. While Douglas's work at the Parvin Foundation was never found to be illegitimate, his ties with the foundation made him a prime target for then-House Minority Leader Gerald R. Ford. Besides being personally disgusted by Douglas's allegedly illicit lifestyle, Representative Ford was also mindful that Douglas protégé Abe Fortas was forced to resign because of ties to a foundation similar to Parvin. Fortas would later say that he "resigned to save Douglas," thinking that the dual investigations into them would stop with his resignation.

Some scholars, have argued that Ford's impeachment attempt was politically motivated. Those who support this contention note Ford's well-known disappointment with the Senate over the failed nominations of Clement Haynsworth and G. Harrold Carswell to succeed Fortas. Thus, in April 1970, Congressman Ford moved to impeach Douglas in an attempt to hit back at the Senate.

On April 15, 1970, at the instigation of Rep. Gerald Ford, Rep. Jacobs began a second attempt to impeach Justice Douglas. His resolution to impeach the Justice, H.R. Res. 920, was referred to the Judiciary Committee for investigation. The next day seven resolutions, H.R. Res. 922, 923, 924, 925, 926, 927, and 928, requesting an investigation of Justice Douglas were introduced on the floor of the House. All of the resolutions sought the creation of a select committee to conduct the investigation, and all were referred to the Rules Committee for further action. On April 20, 1970, Mr. Wyman introduced resolution, H.R. Res. 936, to investigate Justice Douglas. This resolution was referred to the Rules Committee. On April 28, 1970, Mr. Gooding introduced resolution to investigate Justice Douglas. This resolution was also sent to the Rules Committee. On April 21, 1970, a Special Subcommittee of the House Judiciary Committee was appointed to conduct an investigation under House Resolution 920. It issued a progress report on June 20, 1970.

Despite careful maneuvering by House Judiciary Chairman Emanuel Celler, and an apparent lack of proof of any criminal conduct on the part of Douglas (efforts by Attorney General John N. Mitchell and the Nixon administration to gather evidence to the contrary notwithstanding), Congressman Ford moved forward in the first major attempt to impeach a Supreme Court Justice in the modern era.

The hearings began in late April 1970. U.S. Representative Ford was the main witness; he attacked Douglas's "liberal opinions", his "defense of the 'filthy' film I Am Curious (Yellow), and his ties with the aforementioned Parvin. Additionally, Douglas was criticized for accepting $350 for an article he wrote on folk music in the magazine Avant Garde. The magazine's publisher had served a prison sentence for the distribution of another magazine in 1966 that had been deemed pornographic. Describing Douglas' article, Ford stated, "The article itself is not pornographic, although it praises the lusty, lurid, and risqué along with the social protest of left-wing folk singers". Ford also attacked Douglas for his article in Evergreen magazine, which was infamous for its proclivity for pictures of naked women. The Republican congressmen, however, refused to give the majority Democrats copies of the magazines, prompting Congressman Wayne Hays to remark "Has anybody read the article – or is everybody over there who has a magazine just looking at the pictures?"

When it became clear that the impeachment proceedings would be unsuccessful, they were brought to a close, and no public vote on the matter was taken.

The final report of the Special Subcommittee found no cause for impeachment and recommended no further action be taken. Mr. Wyman criticized this report on December 17, 1970. On December 21, 1970, Mr. Dennis, a member of the Judiciary Committee, criticized his Committee for refusing to even bring the Subcommittee report to a vote.

The effort to impeach Douglas and the struggles over the Fortas, Haynesworth, and Carswell nominations marked the beginning of a more partisan climate during the confirmation process of Supreme Court nominees. In 2019, Professor Joshua Kastenberg at the University of New Mexico School of Law published an examination into the impeachment and concluded that Nixon had several motives in goading Ford to move against Douglas. These motives included revenge for Haynsworth and Carswell as well as a cover for the invasion of Cambodia in late April 1970.

=== Alfred Murrah, Stephen Chandler, and Luther Bohanon ===
Luther Bohanon of the Eastern, Northern, and Western Districts of Oklahoma; Stephen Chandler of the Western District of Oklahoma; and Alfred P. Murrah of the 10th Circuit (which sits in Oklahoma) had been feuding so much that it was becoming a national scandal, and thus, many people in Oklahoma demanded their impeachment to put a halt to it. Thus, on February 21, 1966, Congressman Harold R. Gross requested an investigation of these three Oklahoma judges. A resolution to investigate, H.R. Res. 739, was adopted the next day and sent to the House Judiciary Committee which formed an "Ad Hoc Special Subcommittee on Judicial Behavior" for further action.

The investigation, which lasted until 1968, found that the so-called Chandler Mess was reprehensible, but not criminal.

=== Abe Fortas – United States Supreme Court ===
Associate Justice Abe Fortas had accepted a $20,000 retainer from the family foundation of Wall Street financier Louis Wolfson, a friend and former client, in January 1966. Fortas signed a contract with Wolfson's foundation; in return for unspecified advice, it was to pay Fortas $20,000 a year for the rest of Fortas's life (and then pay his widow for the rest of her life). Wolfson was under investigation for securities violations at the time and it is alleged that he expected that his arrangement with Fortas would help him stave off criminal charges or help him secure a presidential pardon. Wolfson did ask Fortas to help him secure a pardon from President Lyndon B. Johnson, which Fortas claimed that he did not do, and he returned the retainer, but not until Wolfson had been indicted twice. Wolfson was convicted in 1967 of selling unregistered shares, and then the following year he was convicted of perjury and obstruction of justice in connection with an Securities and Exchange Commission investigation into a company he chaired. Wolfson served a year in federal prison following that second conviction. Later, when a request to review Wolfson's conviction came before the Court (which it refused), Fortas recused himself.

Early in 1969, the new Nixon administration became aware of the Wolfson deal when a Life reporter began investigating the story; FBI director J. Edgar Hoover also mentioned a "tax dodge" Fortas had entered into with other judges, and President Richard Nixon concluded Fortas should be "off of there." When Chief Justice Earl Warren was informed of the incident by the new Attorney General John N. Mitchell, he persuaded Fortas to resign to protect the reputation of the Court and avoid lengthy impeachment proceedings, which were in their preliminary stages; Fortas' judicial reputation was also affected by the previous Johnson consultation and American University scandals. Justice Hugo Black also urged Fortas to resign, but when Fortas said it would "kill" his wife, Black changed his mind and urged Fortas not to resign. Soon after impeachment proceedings formally began with a resolution introduced by Rep. H. R. Gross (R-Iowa), Fortas decided resignation would be best for him and for his wife's legal career, and told his colleagues.

He resigned from the Court on May 15, 1969. William J. Brennan, Jr. later said, "We were just stunned." Fortas later said he "resigned to save Douglas," another justice who was being investigated for a similar scandal at the same time.

Although Fortas denied that he ever helped Wolfson, there is good reason to doubt that claim. In 1970, after Fortas had resigned from the Court, Louis Wolfson surreptitiously taped a private telephone call with Fortas. The transcript of this call was (ostensibly) inadvertently disclosed by Wolfson's lawyer, Bud Fensterwald, to Washington Post reporter Bob Woodward in 1977. The Washington Post subsequently published several excerpts from the transcript, including language suggesting that Fortas might have indeed spoken with President Johnson about a pardon for Wolfson, but there is no evidence that this intervention was a quid pro quo rather than a voluntary intervention for a friend.

=== Otto Kerner – Seventh Circuit ===
Kerner had been convicted of bribery, and with all his appeals exhausted, he resigned in July 1974 after being told that the House Judiciary Committee would vote to impeach him immediately after they were done with proceedings against President Richard Nixon.

=== Frank J. Battisti – Northern District of Ohio ===
On January 24, 1978, U.S. Representative John M. Ashbrook introduced an impeachment resolution, H.R. Res. 966, against Judge Battisti. The resolution was referred to the Judiciary Committee., where given the judge's sterling record, it died in committee. However, he tried again on January 5, 1981, with H.RES.12, where it died in committee, again.

=== Nauman Scott – Western District of Louisiana ===
On Feb 19, 1981, U.S. Representative Lawrence P. McDonald introduced an impeachment resolution, H.R. Res. 61. against Judge Scott, over the issue of court mandated busing. The bill was referred to the House Judiciary committee, where it died.

=== Harry E. Claiborne – District of Nevada ===
Claiborne was indicted by a federal grand jury for bribery, fraud, and tax evasion in December 1983. In April 1984, however, the jury deadlocked and a mistrial was declared. He was tried again in July on only the evasion charges and was found guilty the next month, making him the first federal judge ever convicted of crimes while on the bench. Claiborne was sentenced to two years in prison in October, and was in prison from May 1986 to October 1987.

This was an unacceptable state of affairs, and on June 3, 1986, Rep. Peter W. Rodino (D-NJ) offered an impeachment resolution, H.R. Res. 461, against him. The resolution was referred to the Judiciary Committee. Rep. Jim Sensenbrenner introduced a second one H.R. Res. 487, against Judge Claiborne on June 24, which was also sent to the Judiciary Committee.

The Judiciary Committee appointed its Subcommittee on Courts, Civil Liberties, and the Administration of Justice to assist with the investigation, and after a quick hearing, the Judiciary Committee reported its findings to the House on July 16 and on the 22nd, the committee report was debated in the House. The report included four articles of impeachment against Judge Claiborne. On July 22, Claiborne was formally impeached by the House, becoming the first person to be impeached in fifty years.

The trial in the senate was held before a special committee, except for the closing arguments, which were held before the full Senate.

On October 9, 1986, the Senate concluded its trial and Judge Claiborne was convicted on all articles except Article III. The exact division on each Article is as follows:

	Yeas	Nays
Article I	87	10
Article II	90	7
Article III	46	17
Article IV	89	8

=== Alcee L. Hastings – Southern District of Florida ===
In 1981, Judge Alcee Hastings was charged with accepting a $150,000 bribe in exchange for a lenient sentence and a return of seized assets for 21 counts of racketeering by Frank and Thomas Romano, and of perjury in his testimony about the case. He was acquitted by a jury after his alleged co-conspirator, William A. Borders Jr., refused to testify in court (resulting in a jail sentence for Borders).

On March 23, 1987, U.S. Representative Jim Sensenbrenner introduced an impeachment resolution, H.R. Res. 128, against Judge Hastings. The resolution was referred to the Judiciary Committee. On March 31, 1987, the Judiciary Committee's Subcommittee on Criminal Justice met in executive session to discuss Judge Hastings' impeachment inquiry.

In the summer of 1988, the full House of Representatives took up the case; Hastings was impeached for bribery and perjury by a vote of 413–3. He was then convicted in 1989 by the United States Senate, becoming the sixth federal judge in the history of the United States to be removed from office by the Senate. The vote on the first article was 69 for and 26 opposed, providing five votes more than the two-thirds of those present that were needed to convict. The first article accused the judge of conspiracy. Conviction on any single article was enough to remove the judge from office. The Senate vote cut across party lines, with Democratic Senator Patrick Leahy from Vermont voting to convict his fellow party member and Senator Arlen Specter from Pennsylvania voting to acquit.

The Senate had the option to forbid Hastings from ever seeking federal office again, but did not do so. Alleged co-conspirator, attorney William Borders went to jail again for refusing to testify in the impeachment proceedings, but was later given a full pardon by President Bill Clinton on his last day in office.

Hastings filed suit in federal court claiming that his impeachment trial was invalid because he was tried by a Senate committee, not in front of the full Senate, and that he had been acquitted in a criminal trial. Judge Stanley Sporkin ruled in favor of Hastings, remanding the case back to the Senate, but stayed his ruling pending the outcome of an appeal to the Supreme Court in a similar case regarding Judge Walter Nixon, who had also been impeached and removed.

Sporkin found some "crucial distinctions" between Nixon's case and Hastings', specifically, that Nixon had been convicted criminally, and that Hastings was not found guilty by two-thirds of the committee who actually "tried" his impeachment in the Senate. He further added that Hastings had a right to trial by the full Senate.

The Supreme Court, however, ruled in Nixon v. United States that the federal courts have no jurisdiction over Senate impeachment matters, so Sporkin's ruling was vacated and Hastings' conviction and removal were upheld. Four years after his conviction, Hastings was elected to the House of Representatives, in which he continued to sit until his death in 2021.

=== Walter L. Nixon, Jr. – Southern District of Mississippi ===
The case stemmed from Judge Walter Nixon's grand jury testimony and statements to federal officers concerning his intervention in the Mississippi's drug prosecution of Drew Fairchild, the son of Nixon's business partner Wiley Fairchild. He was convicted of perjury and sentenced to prison. He refused to resign and continued to receive his judicial salary.

On March 17, 1988, U.S. Representative Peter W. Rodino (D-NJ) introduced an impeachment resolution, H.RES.407, against Nixon, and it was referred to the House Judiciary Committee, which held hearings on the matter. With the case still to be voted on when the term of the House expired, it died. On February 22, 1989, Representative Jack Brooks (D.-Tex.) introduced another impeachment resolution, H.R. Res. 87; the Judiciary Committee submitted its report, H.R. Rep. No. 101-36, to the House on April 25, 1989. The report included three articles of impeachment against Judge Nixon. On May 10, 1989, the House impeached Nixon by a vote of 417 to 0. The Senate concluded its trial on November 3. Judge Nixon was removed from office after being found guilty of articles I and II by a vote of 89 to 8 and 78 to 19 respectively.

Nixon appealed to a federal district court, which reversed the conviction. This was appealed to the Supreme Court, which found the case non-justiciable.

=== Robert P. Aguilar – Northern District of California ===
On May 19, 1993, Representative Jim Sensenbrenner introduced H.RES.177, impeaching Judge Robert Aguilar, who had been indicted in the late 1980s for racketeering and was convicted in a 1990 retrial. It was referred to the House Judiciary Committee, who left it in limbo while the Judge's appeals played out.

In 1994, the conviction was overturned; the resolution was left to die. Judge Aguilar retired in 1996.

=== Robert F. Collins – Eastern District of Louisiana ===
On May 19, 1993, Representative Jim Sensenbrenner introduced H.RES.176, impeaching Judge Robert Frederick Collins. It was referred to the House Judiciary Committee and died there. Later, in June, Jack Brooks tried again with H RES 207.

With impeachment hearings looming, Collins resigned two months later.

== 21st century ==
=== Manuel L. Real – Central District of California ===
On July 17, 2006, U.S. Representative Jim Sensenbrenner (R-WI), Chairman of the House Judiciary Committee, introduced H.RES.916, calling for an investigation of Judge Manuel Real, and consider impeaching him. The House Judiciary Committee's Subcommittee on Courts, the Internet and Intellectual Property subsequently held a hearing on Real's conduct on September 21.

It did not agree to recommend impeachment.

=== G. Thomas Porteous Jr. – Eastern District of Louisiana ===
Judge Thomas Porteous was not convicted of a crime, but was recommended for removal by the Judicial Council of the Fifth Circuit for egregious misconduct that included receiving gifts from attorneys who came before him, filing false statements in his personal bankruptcy case, and engaging in fraudulent and deceptive conduct concerning his debts and gambling losses.

On June 18, 2008, the Judicial Conference of the United States transmitted a certificate to the Speaker of the United States House of Representatives expressing the Conference's determination that consideration of impeachment of Judge Porteous might be warranted. The certificate stated that there was substantial evidence that Judge Porteous "repeatedly committed perjury by signing false financial disclosure forms under oath," thus concealing "cash and things of value that he solicited and received from lawyers appearing in litigation before him." In a specific case, "he denied a motion to recuse based on his relationship with lawyers in the case (...) and failed to disclose that the lawyers in question had often provided him with cash. Thereafter, while a bench verdict (that is, a verdict by a judge sitting without a jury) was pending, he solicited and received from the lawyers appearing before him illegal gratuities in the form of cash and other things of value," thus depriving "the public of its right to his honest services." The certificate concluded that this conduct "constituted an abuse of his judicial office" in violation of the Canons of the Code of Conduct for United States Judges.

The certificate also stated that there was substantial evidence that Judge Porteous had "repeatedly committed perjury by signing false financial disclosure forms under oath" in connection with his bankruptcy, allowing "him to obtain a discharge of his debts while continuing his lifestyle at the expense of his creditors" and that he had "made false representations to gain the extension of a bank loan with the intent to defraud the bank."

On September 18, 2008, the House Judiciary Committee voted unanimously to proceed with an investigation of the bribery and perjury allegations. On October 15, 2008, House Judiciary Chair John Conyers announced that Alan I. Barron had been hired as Special Counsel to lead an inquiry into Judge Porteous's impeachment. Representatives Adam Schiff (D-CA) and Bob Goodlatte (R-VA) were designated as chair and ranking member, respectively to lead the task force conducting the inquiry.

On January 13, 2009, the House of Representatives passed H.Res. 15 by voice vote, authorizing and directing the Committee on the Judiciary to inquire whether the House should impeach Judge Porteous. The judge tried to get a court to stop the hearing in a lawsuit, but failed. On January 21, 2010, the task force voted unanimously to recommend four articles of impeachment. The Judiciary Committee, later reported the articles to the House, which adopted them on March 11, 2010.

An ad hoc Senate committee heard evidence in September and October 2010; a vote by the full Senate took place on December 8, 2010. Article 1 was passed unanimously, Articles 2 was passed by a vote of 69–27, Article 3 was passed by a vote of 88–8, and Article 4 was passed by a vote of 90–6. An order to forever disqualify the former judge from holding any federal office was passed by a vote of 94–2.

=== Samuel Kent – Southern District of Texas ===
On May 11, 2009, Judge Samuel B. Kent was sentenced to 33 months in prison in a sex abuse case for lying to investigators about sexually abusing two female employees. Dick DeGuerin, Kent's attorney, said the judge was retiring from the bench because of a disability – which would allow him to keep receiving his $169,300-a-year salary. Retired federal judges collect their full salaries for the remainder of their lives; judges who resign get nothing. That did not satisfy the leaders of the House Judiciary Committee, Representatives John Conyers (D-Mich.) and Lamar Smith (R-Tex.), who demanded that Kent resign immediately or face possible impeachment.

Judge Kent submitted his resignation on June 2, 2009, with the provision that it will not take effect for a full year. This angered the membership of the House Judiciary Committee, which voted unanimously on sending four articles of impeachment to the full House of Representatives on June 10, 2009. On June 19, the full House passed the articles unanimously, making Judge Kent the 14th judge to be impeached.

As the Senate trial committee was organizing itself, Kent updated his resignation to be effective a year earlier than originally planned. The trial was thus mooted and proceedings came to an end.

=== Jay Bybee – Ninth Circuit ===
Representative Jerrold Nadler (D-NY), a senior member of the House Judiciary Committee on April 20, 2009, called for the impeachment of Judge Jay Bybee, as Bybee was one of the authors of torture memos written by senior Justice Department lawyers during the Bush Administration. In July of that year, Bybee started a legal defense fund in anticipation of impeachment. In February 2010, after more than a year's delay, the Department of Justice released the Office of Professional Responsibility's report on whether government lawyers who wrote these torture memos violated professional ethics and found what Bybee had done was legal.

No impeachment resolution was ever introduced in the House of Representatives.

=== Mark Fuller – Middle District of Alabama ===
Judge Mark Fuller was arrested on August 9, 2014, after his wife called police and reported her husband was drunk and hitting her while they were at an Atlanta hotel. He later accepted a plea deal that will allow his record to be expunged if he completes a counseling program. The Eleventh Circuit Court of Appeals reassigned all of his cases to other judges for the time being.

The plea deal displeased U.S. Representative Terri Sewell (D-AL), who demanded Fuller resign by November 12, 2014. When he did not, she sent a letter to the chairman and ranking Democrat on the House Judiciary Committee to instigate impeachment proceedings. The process was put on hold while the Judicial Conference of the United States investigated the matter. It announced that he had indeed committed impeachable offenses.

Fuller said he would resign on August 1, 2015, but then said he might change his mind. The House Judiciary Committee stated he would indeed be impeached if he did not resign by the date he originally announced, which he did.

=== Clarence Thomas and Samuel Alito – United States Supreme Court ===
On July 10, 2024, Representative Alexandria Ocasio-Cortez (D-NY), along with 19 cosponsors introduced articles of impeachment for Clarence Thomas (H.Res.1353) and Samuel Alito (H.Res.1354), citing a "pattern of refusal to recuse from consequential matters before the court" among other things.

She added, "Justices Thomas and Alito's years' long pattern of misconduct and failure to recuse in cases bearing their clear personal and financial involvement represents an abuse of power and threat to our democracy fundamentally incompatible with continued service on our nation’s highest court."

The resolutions were referred to the House Judiciary Committee, where they died.

=== Retaliation on behalf of the Trump administration. ===
During the first month of Donald Trump’s second presidency, several Federal judges blocked allegedly illegal actions by the administration and its DOGE agency.

DOGE chief Elon Musk furiously tweeted in response; “Without judicial reform, which means at least the absolute worst judges get impeached, we don’t have real democracy in America,”

Several Congressmembers began impeachment proceedings against a few of them to exact revenge, claiming that they had "used their position for political activism," and they had no power to be a check on the omnipotence of the executive, something President Trump agreed vociferously with on a Truth Social post:

This Radical Left Lunatic of a Judge, a troublemaker and agitator who was sadly appointed by Barack Hussein Obama, ... I’m just doing what the VOTERS wanted me to do. This judge, like many of the Crooked Judges’ I am forced to appear before, should be IMPEACHED!!!

Chief Justice John Roberts was responded with a statement that "For more than two centuries, it has been established that impeachment is not an appropriate response to disagreement", and that "The normal appellate review process exists for that purpose".

House Speaker Johnson replied by pointing out that Congress' authority over the federal judiciary includes the power to eliminate entire district courts.

On April 1, 2025, the House judiciary committee began hearings touching on the subject, and concluded that it wasn’t worth the effort.

The following judges were subject to resolutions that were referred to the judiciary committee:

==== Paul Engelmayer—Southern District of New York ====
In February 2025, Judge Paul A. Engelmayer issued an order keeping Elon Musk’s team out of the federal payments system. Articles of impeachment against Engelmayer, were introduced (H.Res.143) by Wisconsin Rep. Derrick Van Orden. It had no cosponsors and was referred to the Judiciary Committee.Shortly after, Rep Eli Crane(R-AZ) introduced HRes 145, with four cosponsors. This was also referred to the Judiciary committee.

==== John Bates—District Court for the District of Columbia. ====
Several MAGA/DOGE leaders, including Elon Musk, had called for the impeachment of Senior district Judge John Bates, however, on Feb. 24, 2025, Rep. Andy Ogles (R-TN) introduced a resolution (HR 157) anyway. It was referred to the Judiciary Committee.

==== Amir Ali—District Court for the District of Columbia ====
On Feb. 27, 2025 Rep. Andy Ogles introduced an impeachment resolution (HR 174) against Judge Amir Ali for granting a temporary restraining order in the case of Department of State v. AIDS Vaccine Advocacy Coalition.

==== John McConnell Jr.—District of Rhode Island ====
U.S. District Judge John J. McConnell Jr. told the White House that it must abide by the preliminary injunction to halt its funding freeze. A few days later, in mid February, Rep. Andrew Clyde (R-Ga.) announced that he was drafting articles of impeachment against him.

He finally introduced them on March 24, 2025(HR 241) and they were sent to the judiciary committee.

==== Theodore Chuang—District Court for the District of Maryland ====
On March 18, 2025, Judge Chuang ruled that Elon Musk and DOGE exercised unconstitutional authority “in multiple ways” in dismantling the U.S. Agency for International Development (USAID).

About a week later, on March 24, Rep. Ogles introduced HR 246, which was sent to the Judiciary Committee.

==== Adam Abelson— District judge for the District of Maryland ====
Several MAGA/DOGE leaders, including Elon Musk, have been discussing with Rep. Eli Crane as to whether to impeach District Judge Adam Abelson for his rulings on DEI issues.

==== James Boasberg—Chief Judge of the United States District Court for the District of Columbia ====
On March 17, 2025, Rep. Brandon Gill (R-TX) announced his intention to Impeach Judge James Boasberg for blocking Trump’s Use of the Alien Enemies Act. The following day, Rep.Gill (R-Texas) introduced a resolution (H.Res.229) to impeach Judge Boasberg,

==== Charles R. Breyer—District judge for the Northern District of California ====
On June 26, 2025, Rep. Randy Fine (R-FL) introduced H.Res.556 to impeach Judge Charles Breyer for "high crimes and misdemeanors" after Judge Breyer had issued a ruling against the Trump administration in Newsom v. Trump saying that his decision was an "abuse of power."
