= Union Church Presbyterian Church =

Historic church in Mississippi, United States

- U.S. National Register of Historic Places
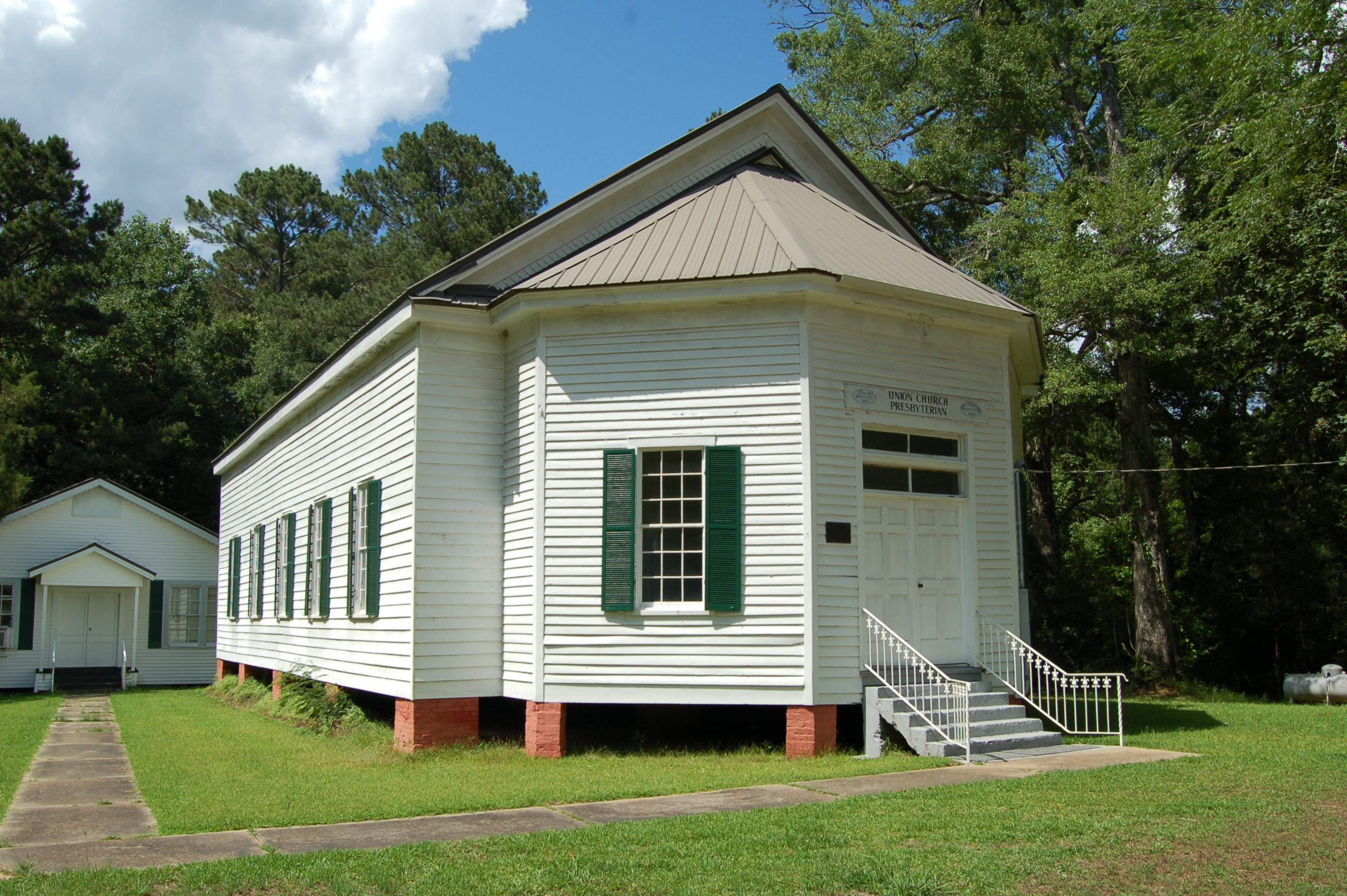

- Location within Mississippi Location within the United States
- Location: MS 550; Union Church, Mississippi
- Coordinates: 31°40′58″N 90°47′26″W
- Area: 22 acres (8.9 ha)
- Built: 1852
- NRHP reference No.: 79001322
- Added to NRHP: July 18, 1979

Union Church Presbyterian Church is a historic church on MS 550 in Union Church, Mississippi. It was the hub of an ethno-linguistic community known as the Scotch settlement.

It was built in 1852 and added to the National Register in 1979.
