= Peter Bryan Bruin =

Mississippi territorial judge (1754–1827)

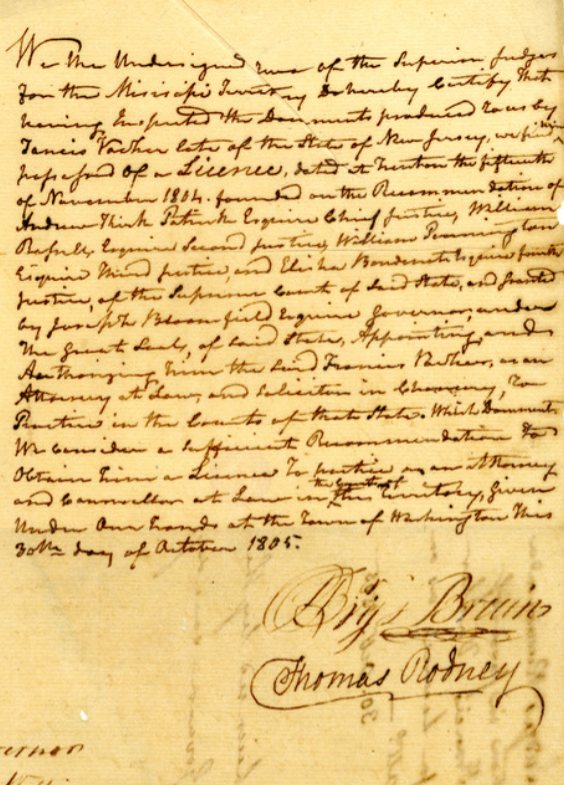
- Bryan Bruin and Thomas Rodney, Superior Judges at Washington approve Francis Vacher for a law license, 1805
- Born: 1754
- Died: January 27, 1827; Bruinsburg, Claiborne County, Mississippi, United States

Peter Bryan Bruin (1754 – January 27, 1827) was a landowner and judge in Mississippi Territory, United States. A veteran of the American Revolutionary War who served as an officer with Daniel Morgan and worked as an aide-de-camp to John Sullivan, he settled in the Natchez District shortly after the conclusion of the American revolution. He was later a host to a young Andrew Jackson and Rachel Donelson Robards, on what may have amounted to their honeymoon circa 1790. In 1798 Bruin was signatory to the "Memorial to Congress by Permanent Committee of the Natchez District," which encouraged the U.S. Congress to annex the Natchez District from Spain and to preserve and extend slavery in the region. After the Mississippi Territory was organized, he was appointed to be a judge by John Adams. Bruin was tangentially connected to Aaron Burr's still-mysterious shenanigans in the lower Mississippi River valley in 1806. In 1808, the Mississippi Territorial Legislature passed a resolution condemning Bruin's conduct on the bench, and delegate George Poindexter requested that the U.S. Congress open an impeachment investigation into Bruin. Bruin resigned his judgeship amidst public charges of alcoholism and dereliction of judicial duty.

The now-extinct settlement at Bruinsburg Landing in Claiborne County was named for him, and Lake Bruin State Park also bears his name.

== Early life ==
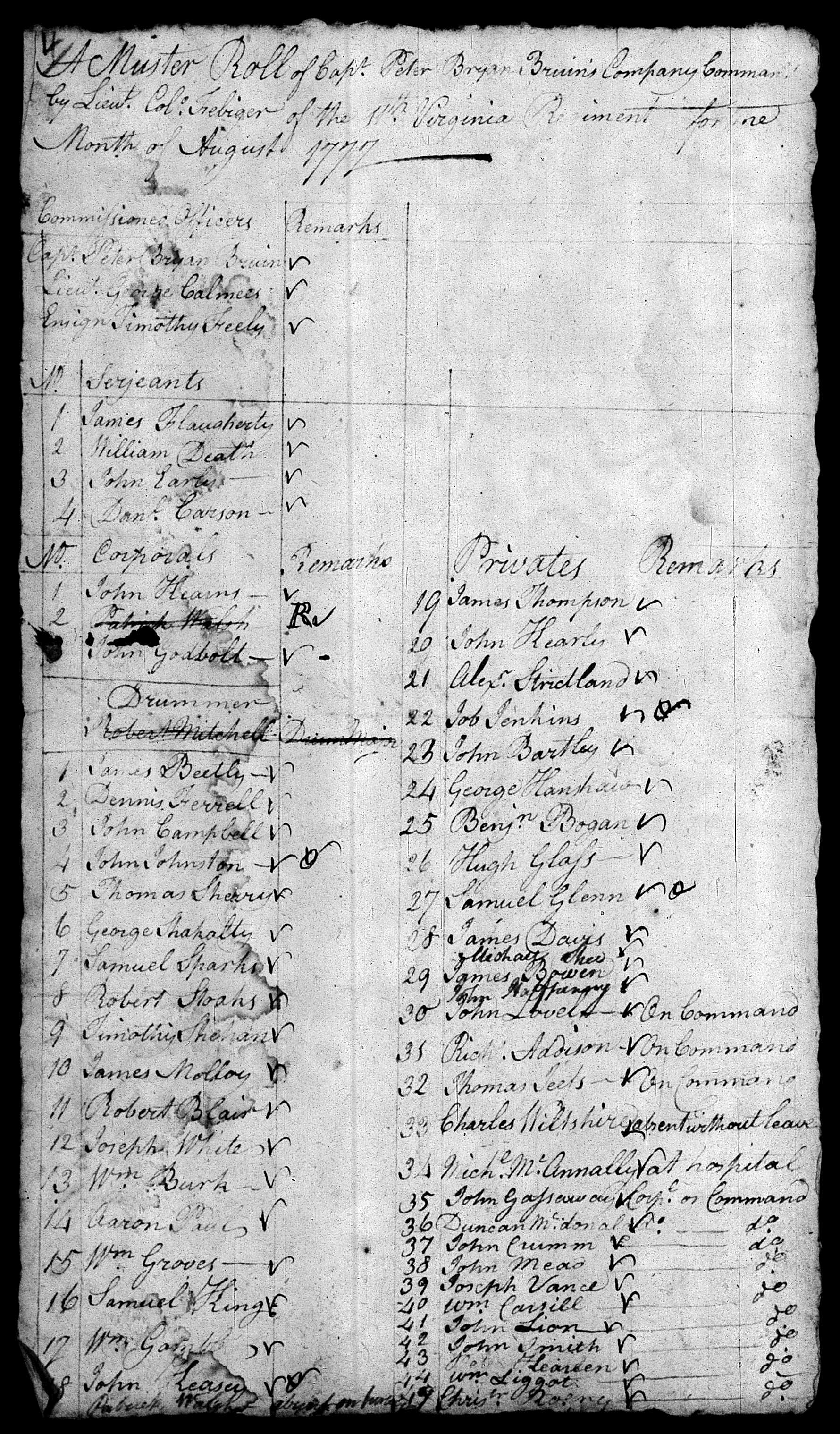
"A muster roll of Capt. Peter Bryan Bruin's Company," 11th Virginia Regiment, August 1777

Peter Bryan Bruin was born in 1754. According to Mississippi historian Dunbar Rowland in 1935, "The young man in early life was a merchant. In the Virginia Colony in 1775 he was a lieutenant of Virginia provincials. He shared in the assault on Quebec, December 31, 1775, was badly wounded at the moment General Montgomery was killed, was made prisoner, and for six months suffered the horrors of the prison ships. Being exchanged on July 19, 1776, he was promoted to major and aide-de-camp to General Sullivan, November 9, 1777, and later was a major in the 7th Virginia to the close of the war." Surviving muster rolls show that Bruin was a company captain in the 11th Virginia Regiment during the American Revolutionary War. According to historian Roger G. Kennedy in 2000, "Bruin joined the Eleventh Virginia Regiment and served with [Aaron] Burr in Canada, where both were wounded. Captured during the retreat from Quebec, he contracted smallpox but survived, was released, and reenlisted under General John Sullivan for a campaign against the Iroquois. Bruin served with the French in their Rhode Island campaign and was with the Virginia Continentals in the siege lines around Yorktown to witness the surrender of Cornwallis." According to the Compiled Service Records of Soldiers who Served in the American Army During the Revolutionary War he served as lieutenant in Capt. Morgan's Company. He may have later applied for a military pension or land-bounty warrant. Bruin was reportedly married in Fauquier County, Virginia in 1781.

== Move to Mississippi ==
Bruin's daughter claimed that she and her father had arrived in Mississippi in 1784. According to Rowland, Bruin came to Natchez in 1788 with his family "and several others...having accepted the colonizing propositions of Minister Gardoquí." According to historian Lawrence Kinnard, "A significant event in the history of Mississippi Valley colonization under Spain was the arrival of Bryan Bruin at New Orleans in 1787. On March 31, he presented a petition to Governor Miró on behalf of himself and a group of Virginia Catholics for permission to settle in West Florida. The governor approved the request and granted to each family a tract of land to be located in unoccupied areas fronting upon the Mississippi or any of the creeks or bayous. Each tract was to consist of eight hundred arpents and a second grant of equal size was promised when the first was under cultivation. At the same time, Miró announced that other Catholic families would be received in the province under the same conditions. He reported his action to his government and by October, 1787, had received a royal order approving it. The project of Bruin was important for two reasons. First, his mission to New Orleans antedated the visit of Wilkinson and the arrival of d’Argés in Spain. Second, as a result of Miró's decision to make liberal grants to Bruin and his associates, it became known that lands might be obtained more easily in Spanish territory than in the United States. Bryan Bruin and his son, Peter Bryan Bruin, became influential planters in West Florida and later received additional grants of land in the valley of the Ouachita." When the Bruins arrived they reportedly came with 35 free whites (23 men, five women, seven children) and 31 enslaved Africans, and "Pedro" Bruin "was granted a total of nearly 3200 acres including an especially valuable 680 acre section between Bayou Pierre and the Mississippi". In 1790 he was approached by Tom Washington of the South Carolina Yazoo Company about being an intermediary between eastern land speculators and Spanish colonial administrators.

== Politics ==
Bruin served as alcalde after British West Florida became Spanish West Florida. In 1797 he was a signatory, along with Gabriel Benoist, Philander Smith, Daniel Clark Sr., Frederick Kimball, William Ratliff, Roger Dixon, and Isaac Gaillard, to a document known as the "Memorial to Congress by Permanent Committee of the Natchez District." The group presented themselves as democratically elected representatives of the white land-owning settlers of Mississippi, and signaled that they would rather be associated with the United States than their current Spanish governors, writing that "...to prevent anarchy, and confusion (when his Catholic Majesty may be pleased to withdraw his troops & cause this Country to be given up to the U.S.) prepare a Constitution or form of Govt for this territory which shall in your wisdom appear the best calculated to ensure to the inhabitants of this settlement in its infant State the blessings of peace safety & good order and that the officers of the new government may have the confidence of the people..." They requested that the U.S. Congress allow the continuation of slavery in the Mississippi lands, writing, "Your memorialists beg leave to represent that great part of the labour in this Country is performed by slaves, as in the Southern States, and without which, in their present situation the farms in this District would be but of little more value to the present occupiers than equal quantity of waste land. From this consideration your Memorialists request that the system of slavery may be continued as heretofore in this territory." Bruin's group was generally composed of merchants who supported the views of Andrew Ellicott. A competing committee organized in September 1797, which was composed largely of plantation owners and "debtors" and was loyal to adventurer Anthony Hutchins, consisted of Abner Green, Thomas Green Sr., Chester Ashley, Daniel Burnet, Landon Davis, Justice King, Dr. John Shaw, and James Stuart.

Andrew Jackson traded slaves at Bruinsburg in the 1790s, and Bruin was said to have hosted Jackson and Rachel Donelson Robards on what was effectively their honeymoon. Bruin was appointed to be a territorial judge by U.S. president John Adams, effective May 7, 1798. Thomas Pickering wrote Winthrop Sargent that Bruin had "been settled at the Natchez for many years. He was an aid-de-camp to General Sullivan in the American War." For his part, territorial governor Winthrop Sargent wrote a letter decrying the state of the territorial judiciary, commenting, "My great source of uneasiness is the want of judges. I pray God Mr. McGuire may soon arrive, or some law character. In a court from which is no appeal, most certainly there should be a law knowledge. Judge Bruin, a worthy and sensible man, is beyond doubt deficient, and Judge Tilton cannot have had more reading and experience [than Bruin]." Judge Bruin generally covered the "Jefferson District" where he was resident, which name carried on after statehood as Jefferson County, Mississippi. Sargent's replacement, William C. C. Claiborne, wrote in 1801, "Judges Tilton and Bruin are amiable gentlemen, not qualified for the position." In August 1805 a man called Williams wrote Thomas Jefferson, "I am happy to know there is a probability of our having a Judge, for I do assure you the Territory Suffers very much in its Judicial Charecter—Judge Bruin is Seldom able to attend the Courts." The following year Thomas Rodney wrote Jefferson that "we have had but Two Judges in this part of the Territory, and One of them Judge Bruin, is very Seldom able to Attend the Courts, so that the Judicial business has required much more of my attention than it could have done." Meanwhile, the so-called Scotch settlement of Jefferson County was established after Judge Bruin welcomed a party of Presbyterian immigrants from the Highlands of Scotland. Bruin's wife Elizabeth died September 17, 1807, and was interred at "Bruin Mount." The funeral ministers were Presbyterians Rev. James Smylie of the Scotch settlement and Rev. Joseph Bullen Jr. missionary to the Chickasaw Nation.

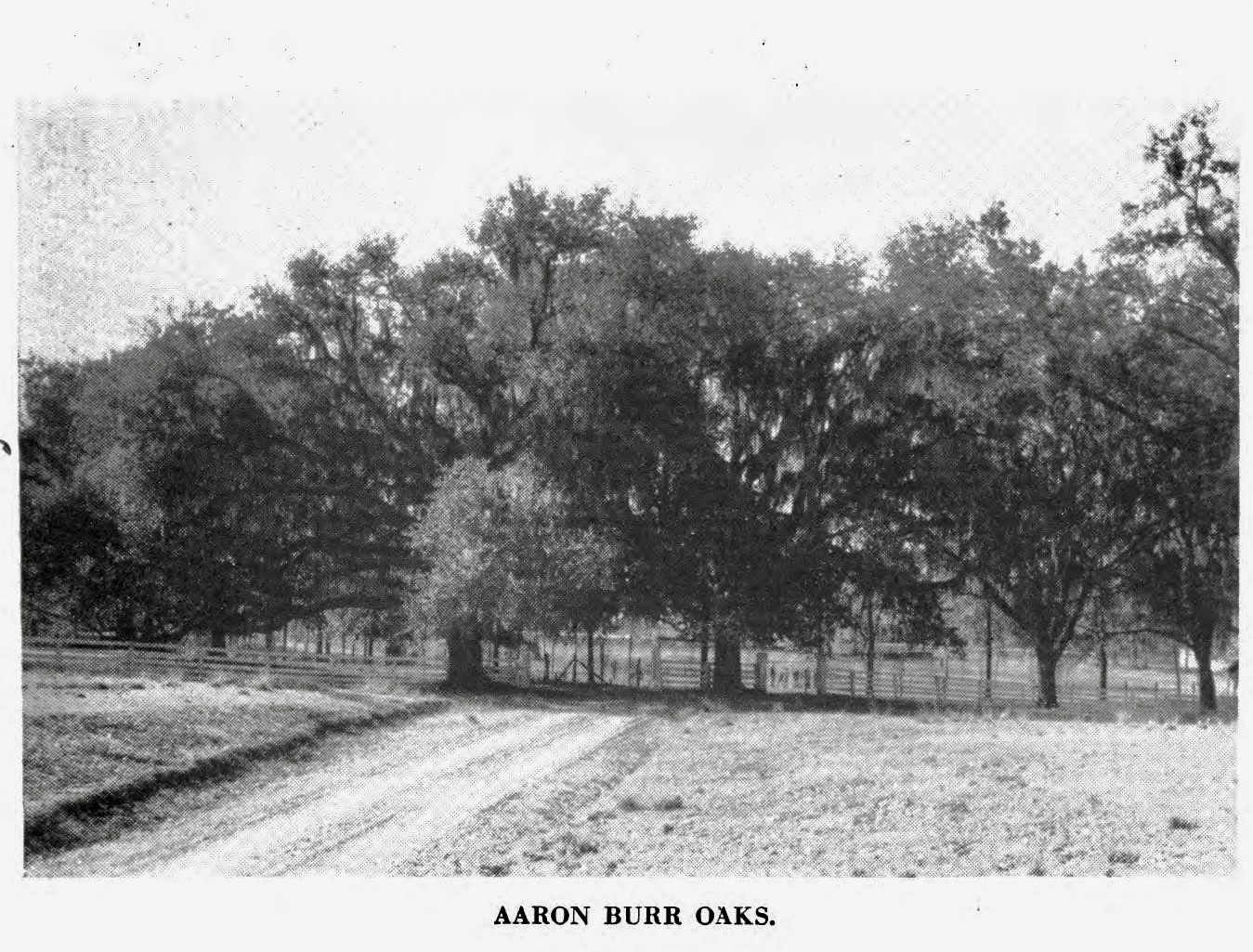
Aaron Burr Oaks at Jefferson College, the grove where the grand jury assembled, photographed circa 1938

In February 1807, at Jefferson College, judges Bruin and Rodney presided over a grand jury in the Burr conspiracy case.

== Impeachment ==
Bruin's already problematic drinking may have worsened after his wife Elizabeth died on September 17, 1807. In March 1808 the Mississippi Territorial Legislature passed a resolution condemning Bruin for having "been much addicted to drunkeness especially during the terms of the Courts, and has frequently appeared on the Bench in such an extreme state of Intoxication as to disqualify him entirely from performing the Solemn and important duties of his Office" resulting in a "manifest injury to the people of this Territory..." The message was passed up the U.S. president who handed it off to the Congress. Territorial delegate George Poindexter asked Congress to investigate and ultimately impeach Bruin, and shared that he had personally seen Bruin asleep on the bench, be awakened by a clerk, and then drowse back into unconsciousness five minutes later. Congress postponed any action on Poindexter's proposal until the next session. Bruin resigned "after thirty-six years of public life" in a letter to U.S. Secretary of State James Madison in October 1808, effective date March 1, 1809. Bruin died at Bruinsburg on January 27, 1827. He was reportedly buried in one of the mounds at Windsor that "was later used as a cemetery for the Daniel and Freeland families."

== Bruin's plantation and settlement ==
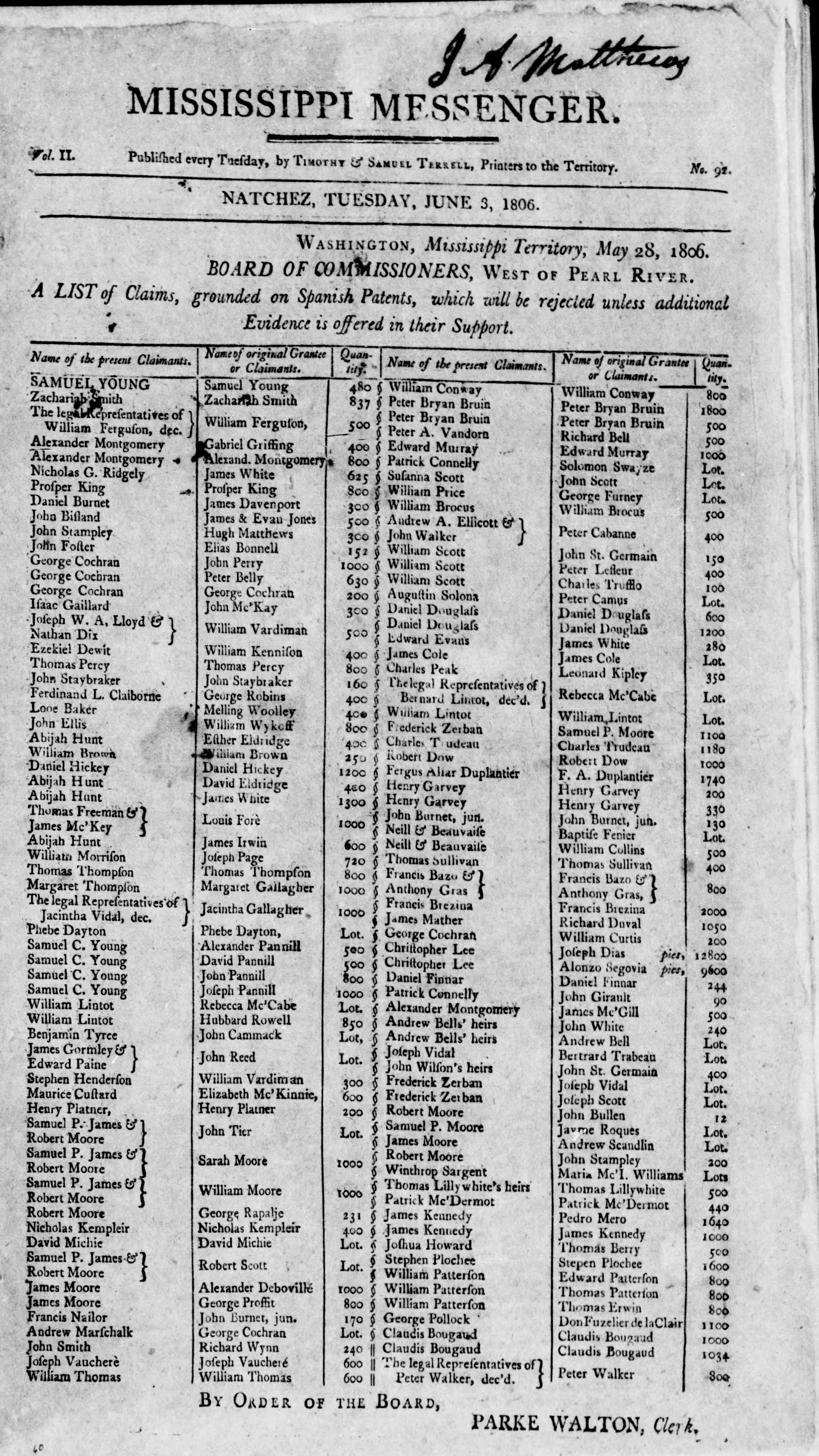
"A LIST of Claims, grounded in Spanish Patents, which will be rejected unless additional Evidence is offered in their Support" The Mississippi Messenger, Natchez, June 3, 1806

The Spanish governor granted Bruin 1,350 acres along Coles Creek. Bruin owned two plantations along the Mississippi River, one in what is now Tensas Parish, Louisiana and one in what is now Claiborne County, Mississippi. He founded Bruinsburg, Mississippi, and Lake Bruin is also named for him. Bayou Pierre ("Peter's River") may also be named for him. Bruinsburg Landing was a notable site in the drama surrounding Aaron Burr's actions in the lower Mississippi River valley in 1807. According to Mississippi historian J. F. H. Claiborne, "Early in January, of the coldest winter ever known here, Colonel Burr, with nine boats, arrived at the mouth of Bayou Pierre, and tied up on the western or Louisiana shore. He crossed over to the residence of Judge Bruin, (whom he had known in the revolutionary war) and there learned, for the first time, that the Territorial authorities would oppose his descent, though his landing on the Louisiana side would seem to indicate that he apprehended some opposition. He immediately wrote to Governor Mead, disavowing hostile intentions towards the Territory or the country; that he was en route to the Ouachitta to colonize his lands, and that any attempt to obstruct him would be illegal and might provoke civil war."

The Bruinsburg plantation on the Mississippi side was later owned by the Evans family. One local historian surmises that the Tensas land later became Albert Bondurant's Pleasant View plantation.

According to abstracts of colonial-era Natchez District court records, Bruin claimed a Spanish land grant but this claim was rejected by the territorial government: "No. 1540. Claimant: Peter B. Bruin, 29 Mar. 1804. Rejected 13 June 1807. Miss. Ter. Claiborne Co. Peter Bryan Bruin claims 800 arpents in sd county on Miss. River by virtue of his having inhabited and cultivated the same ever since 1789. He was at that time 21 years of age and claims sd tract from a certificate of survey from the Spanish Government."

== Family ==
As of 1800 he had a son-in-law named John B. Scott, who was in the "cotton trade" with Wade Hampton and John C. Nightingale. His daughter was married first to a Robert G. Scott (with whom she had a son, William S. Scott of Carroll Parish, Louisiana), and married second to William Briscoe of Claiborne County, Mississippi.

== See also ==
- List of impeachment investigations of United States federal judges
- List of unsuccessful efforts to impeach United States federal officials
- History of slavery in Mississippi
- List of Mississippi Territory judges

== Sources ==
- Buckner, Timothy Ryan (August 2005). Constructing Identities on the Frontier of Slavery, Natchez, Mississippi, 1760–1860 (Thesis). University of Texas at Austin.
- Carter, Clarence Edwin, ed. (1937). Territorial Papers of the United States. Records of the U.S. Department of State. Vol. V: The Territory of Mississippi, 1798–1817. Washington, D.C.: U.S. Government Printing Office. Publication No. 1032 (E173 147) – via HathiTrust; digitized by Google Books from a copy held by the University of California Libraries. This article incorporates text from this source, which is in the public domain.
- Claiborne, John Francis Hamtramck (1880). Mississippi, as a Province, Territory, and State, with Biographical Notices of Eminent Citizens. Jackson, Mississippi: Power & Barksdale – via Internet Archive, Cornell University Library.
- Everton, Muriel (May 1, 2010). Libel in Mississippi, 1798–1832 (Ph.D. thesis). 949 – via University of Southern Mississippi.
- James, D. Clayton (1993) [1968]. Antebellum Natchez (Reprint ed.). Baton Rouge: Louisiana State University Press. ISBN 978-0-8071-1860-3. LCCN 68028496. OCLC 448975.
- Kennedy, Roger G. (2000). Burr, Hamilton, and Jefferson. Oxford University Press. doi:10.1093/acprof:oso/9780195140552.001.0001. ISBN 978-0-19-514055-2. LCCN 99022453. OCLC 181840559.
- McBee, May Wilson (1953). The Natchez Court Records, 1767–1805: Abstracts of Early Records. Ann Arbor, Michigan: Edwards Brothers, Inc. – via Internet Archive, scanned from the collection of the Allen County Public Library Genealogy Center.
- Mitchell, Dennis J. (2014). A New History of Mississippi. Jackson: University Press of Mississippi. ISBN 9781626740198. LCCN 2013044104. OCLC 863127649. Project MUSE book 33980.
- Nelson, Stanley (September 19, 2018). "Judge Bruin's final days on the bench". Concordia Sentinel.
- Rothstein, Morton (1989). "'The Remotest Corner': Natchez on the American Frontier". In Polk, Noel (ed.). Natchez Before 1830. The L. O. Crosby Jr. Memorial Lectures in Mississippi Culture. Jackson: University Press of Mississippi. pp. 92–108. ISBN 978-0-87805-380-3. LCCN 88028046. OCLC 18739746.
- Rowland, Dunbar (1935). Courts, Judges, and Lawyers of Mississippi, 1798–1935. Mississippi Historical Society, and Mississippi Department of Archives and History. Jackson, Mississippi: Press of Hederman Bros. – via HathiTrust, digitized by Google Books from a copy held by the University of Michigan Libraries.
- Soliman, Anthony Albey (June 1, 2018). "For All Such, a Country is Provided": Choctaw Removal, Slave Trading, and Law in Southwestern Mississippi, 1800–1841 (Thesis). San Luis Obispo, California: California Polytechnic State University. doi:10.15368/theses.2018.61.
- Whitaker, Arthur P. (1927). The Spanish-American Frontier, 1783–1795: The Westward Movement and the Spanish Retreat in the Mississippi Valley. Boston: Houghton Mifflin Co. LCCN 27023368. OCLC 951828. OL 1159732W.
