= Scotch settlement (Mississippi) =

Ethno-linguistic enclaves

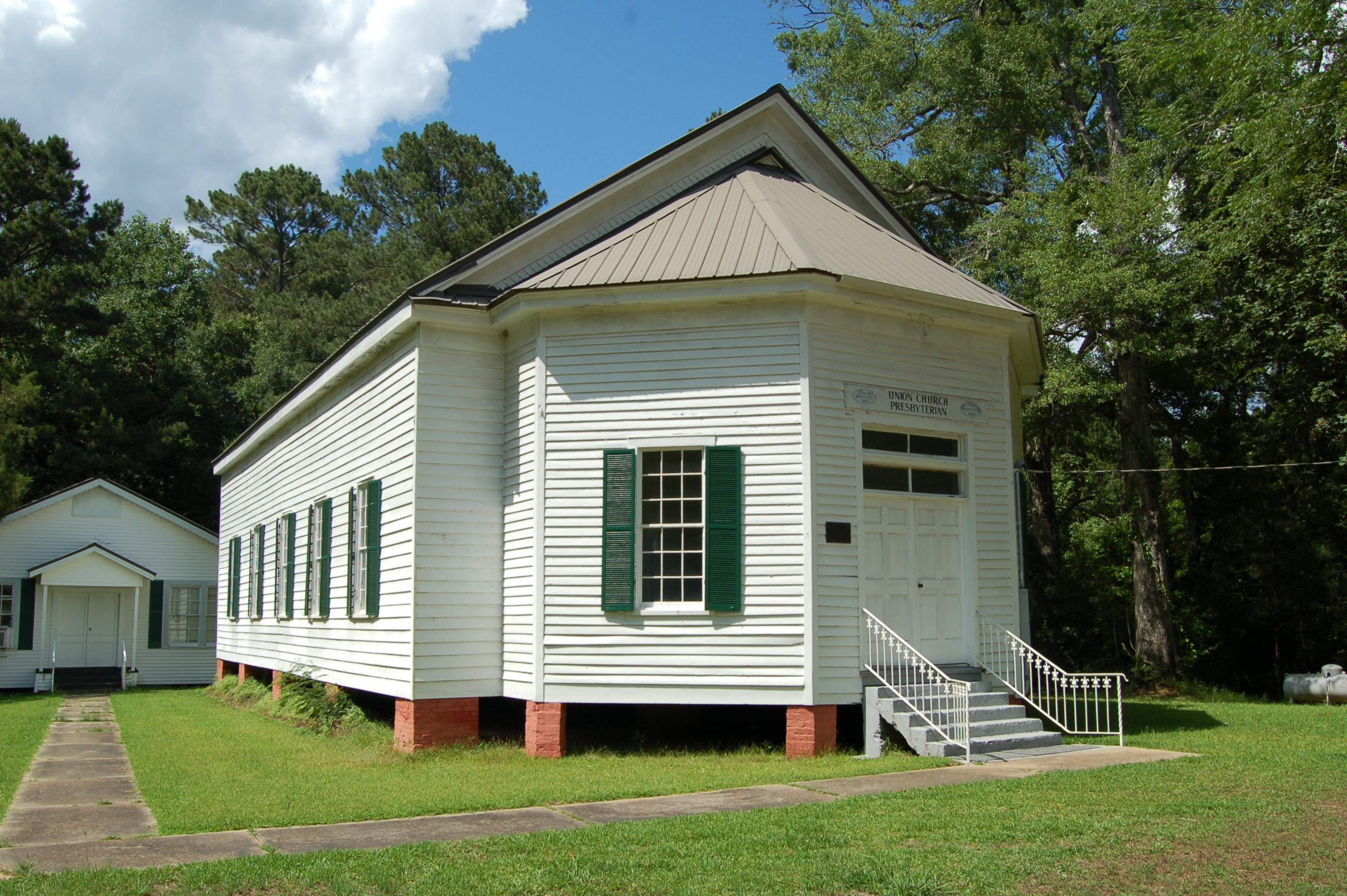
Union Church was the heart of the settlement in Jefferson County.

The so-called Scotch settlement of Mississippi, United States was located in the southeastern section of Jefferson County. There was also a lesser-known Scotch settlement in Wayne County, Mississippi.

== Jefferson County ==
The area considered the Scotch settlement was about 20 miles long and ten miles wide, and extended into what later became Lincoln County, Mississippi. Scottish Gaelic was the common language for at least the first half of the 19th century. The colony was established in 1806 when immigrants from the Highlands of Scotland by way of North Carolina inquired with Judge Peter Bryan Bruin of Bayou Pierre about the prospects for settling in Natchez, in what was then Mississippi Territory. One of the visitors, Dugald Torrey, found Bruin in the company of Waterman Crane and a Presbyterian minister he knew from North Carolina known as Rev. Mr. Brown. They started farming lands in the east end of the county, and "in a few years, over one hundred Highland-Scotch Presbyterian families settled in their vicinity. Most of them spoke the Gaelic language [and] had been taught the Shorter Catechism." Many of the migrants came from Robeson County, North Carolina. Some of the surnames of the settlers were Gilcrist, Baker, Cameron, McIntyre, McLauchlin, McLaurin, Buie, Cato, Brown, Smith, Patterson, Watson, Galbreath, Smylie, Trimble, McClutchie, Farley, Curie, Wilkinson, McCormick, McMillan, McClean, Henderson, McCallum, McCutchens, McIntyre, Montgomery, McPherson, Curry, and Torrey.

According to a history published in 1906, the heyday of the settlement began about 15 years after the founding:

"The period between 1820 and 1830 might be called the romance days of the Scotch settlement. Everything was young, bright, fresh, and full of life and vigor. The country abounded in game and the streams in fish. The lowlands and sometimes the hills were covered with canebrakes. Farming was an easy matter at that day. Burn away the brakes and plant your corn and you would be sure of a harvest. Natchez was the market town for all the country and Union Church was a point on the highway between the eastern counties and Natchez, and in the fall of the year long trains of wagons pulled by teams of heavy oxen were strung out a hundred miles from the interior of the State to the Mississippi River. It is forty-five miles from Union Church to Natchez, and it was a great occasion for a farmer to yoke up his oxen and start to market with the whole week before him for going and returning. Some of the old Scotch were not averse to strong drink, and coming back with a jug of Scotch whisky their animal spirits would be stirred on the way and their home coming would be loudly advertised. But such an one would unfailingly be brought before his brethren in the church and he would be certain of a reprimand and would probably be excommunicated for a while."

However, the success of the settlement was based on widespread ownership of slaves and "to them the civil war with its results was exceedingly disastrous. When their slave property was lost their lands became useless. Their splendid carriages, wagons and teams rapidly disappeared. The price of cotton was not remunerative, the old men gradually died and the young men left the farms, so that the glory of this part of the Scotch settlement is mainly in the past."

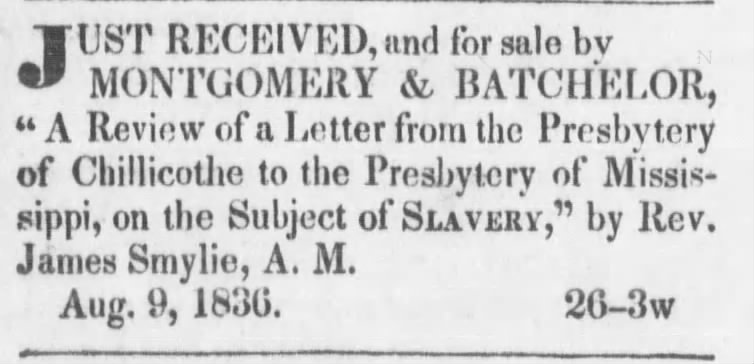
An ad for Smylie's pamphlet in the newspaper of nearby Rodney, Mississippi, 1836

The Rev. James Smylie (1780–1853), whom Harriet Beecher Stowe once castigated for his religiously argued pro-slavery pamphlet, was from this community. Stowe wrote of the domestic slave trade in A Key to Uncle Tom's Cabin, "Mr. Lindsey is going to be receiving, from time to time, all the season, and will sell as cheap as anybody; so there's no fear of the supply falling off...Query: Are these Messrs. Sanders & Foster, and J. W. Lindsey, and S. N. Brown, and McLean, and Woodroof, and McLendon, all members of the church, in good and regular standing? Does the question shock you? Why so? Why should they not be? The Rev. Dr. Smylie, of Mississippi, in a document endorsed by two Presbyteries, says distinctly that the Bible gives a right to buy and sell slaves."

== Wayne County ==
There was also community of immigrants from Scotland in Wayne County, Mississippi. In 1812 the Wayne County Scots established a school where Gaelic was the primary language.
