= Philander Smith (Mississippi) =

Colonial Mississippi settler (1765–1824)

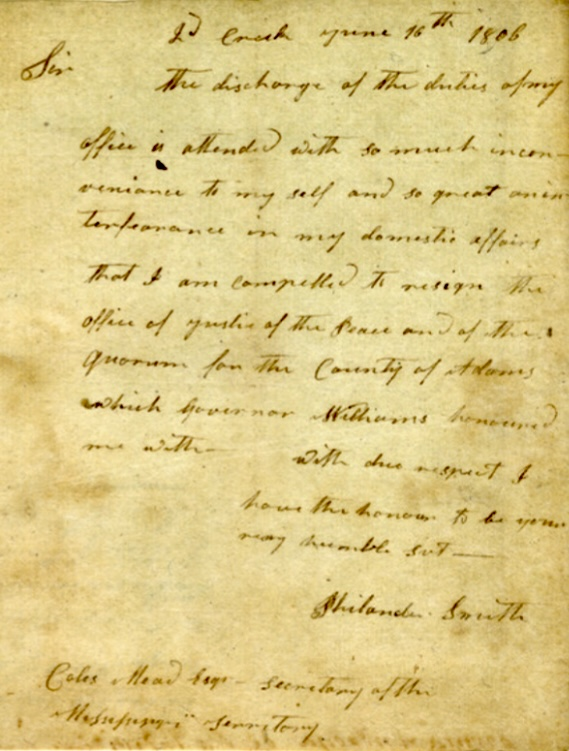
1806 resignation of the office of Justice of the Peace and of the Quorum for Adams County, Mississippi Territory, by Philander Smith of Second Creek, submitted to acting governor Cowles Mead

Philander Smith (January 11, 1765 – June 29, 1824) was a colonial-era settler of the Natchez District of Mississippi in North America. He was involved in the political movement to make the district an American territory rather than a Spanish colony. In 1807, he served as foreperson of the grand jury in the Aaron Burr treason indictment. He served in the Mississippi territorial legislature from 1804 to 1811.

== Biography ==
He arrived in the Natchez District of West Florida with his Loyalist parents in 1776. He was the eighth of 12 children. In 1797, along with Peter Bryan Bruin, Gabriel Benoist, Daniel Clark, Frederick Kimball, William Ratliff, Roger Dixon, and Isaac Gaillard, he signed a document known as the "Memorial to Congress by Permanent Committee of the Natchez District." The group presented themselves as democratically elected representatives of the white land-owning settlers of Mississippi, and signaled that they would rather be associated with the United States than their current Spanish governors, writing that "...to prevent anarchy, and confusion (when his Catholic Majesty may be pleased to withdraw his troops & cause this Country to be given up to the U.S.) prepare a Constitution or form of Govt for this territory which shall in your wisdom appear the best calculated to ensure to the inhabitants of this settlement in its infant State the blessings of peace safety & good order and that the officers of the new government may have the confidence of the people..." They also petitioned Congress to preserve slavery in the Mississippi Territory, writing, "Your memorialists beg leave to represent that great part of the labour in this Country is performed by slaves, as in the Southern States, and without which, in their present situation the farms in this District would be but of little more value to the present occupiers than equal quantity of waste land. From this consideration your Memorialists request that the system of slavery may be continued as heretofore in this territory." In 1798 when the Mississippi Territory was organized he administered the oath of allegiance to several literate white male landowners in his neighborhood, including his brother Calvin Smith.

In 1807 he was foreperson of the Mississippi Territory grand jury in the Aaron Burr conspiracy case. According to historian Thomas P. Abernethy, the "grand jury was said to have been packed so as to consist entirely of Federalists and friends of Burr."

He served in the Mississippi Territorial legislature from 1804 to 1811, and as speaker of the territorial house from 1804 to 1805. He received 80 votes in the 1813 election for Adams County in the territorial assembly.

He was buried in a family cemetery near his former plantation, which was later destroyed by fire, along Second Creek.

== Sources ==
- Abernethy, Thomas Perkins (1949). "Aaron Burr in Mississippi". The Journal of Southern History. 15 (1): 9–21. doi:10.2307/2198070. ISSN 0022-4642. JSTOR 2198070.
- Carter, Clarence Edwin, ed. (1937). Territorial Papers of the United States. Records of the U.S. Department of State. Vol. V: The Territory of Mississippi, 1798–1817. Washington, D.C.: U.S. Government Printing Office. Publication No. 1032 (E173 147) – via HathiTrust; digitized by Google Books from a copy held by the University of California Libraries. This article incorporates text from this source, which is in the public domain.
- Soliman, Anthony Albey (June 2018). "For All Such, a Country is Provided": Choctaw Removal, Slave Trading, and Law in Southwestern Mississippi, 1800–1841 (M.A. thesis). San Luis Obispo, California: California Polytechnic State University. doi:10.15368/theses.2018.61.
