= National Register of Historic Places listings in Claiborne County, Mississippi =

Location of Claiborne County in Mississippi

This is a list of the National Register of Historic Places listings in Claiborne County, Mississippi.

This is intended to be a complete list of the properties and districts on the National Register of Historic Places in Claiborne County, Mississippi, United States. Latitude and longitude coordinates are provided for many National Register properties and districts; these locations may be seen together in a map.

There are 36 properties and districts listed on the National Register in the county, including 2 National Historic Landmarks. Another two properties were once listed but have been removed.

This National Park Service list is complete through NPS recent listings posted October 23, 2026.

== Current listings ==
	Name on the Register	Image	Date listed	Location	City or town	Description
1	Alcorn State University Historic District	Alcorn State University Historic District	May 20, 1982 (#82003098)	Alcorn State University campus 31°52′32″N 91°08′59″W	Lorman	
2	Bayou Pierre Site	Bayou Pierre Site	June 23, 1978 (#78001596)	Address restricted	Port Gibson	
3	Bethel Presbyterian Church	Bethel Presbyterian Church	November 28, 1978 (#78001594)	North of Alcorn on Mississippi Highway 552; 31°54′21″N 91°07′44″W	Alcorn	
4	Buena Vista Cotton Gin		December 27, 1974 (#74001059)	Northeast of Port Gibson; 31°59′23″N 90°54′35″W	Port Gibson	
5	Building at 801 Chinquepin Street		July 22, 1979 (#79003420)	801 Chinquepin St. 31°57′18″N 90°58′41″W	Port Gibson	
6	Canemount	Canemount	December 2, 1982 (#82000572)	North of Alcorn off Mississippi Highway 552; 31°53′40″N 91°07′34″W	Alcorn	
7	Catholic Cemetery	Catholic Cemetery	July 22, 1979 (#79003425)	700 Coffee St. 31°57′21″N 90°58′43″W	Port Gibson	
8	Catledge Archeological Site	Catledge Archeological Site	July 15, 1974 (#74001058)	Address restricted	Alcorn	
9	Centers Creek Mound	Centers Creek Mound	August 14, 1973 (#73001003)	Address restricted	Russum	
10	Chamberlain-Hunt Academy Historic District	Chamberlain-Hunt Academy Historic District	July 22, 1979 (#79003411)	Roughly bounded by U.S. Route 61, the city limits, Woodstock St., and Mississippi Highway 547; 31°56′43″N 90°59′12″W	Port Gibson	
11	Claremont		July 22, 1979 (#79003418)	366 Claremont Dr. 31°56′59″N 90°59′33″W	Port Gibson	
12	Collina	Collina	July 22, 1979 (#79003419)	Greenwood St. Extension; 31°57′15″N 90°59′25″W	Port Gibson	
13	Drake Hill Historic District		July 22, 1979 (#79003412)	Drake Hill Rd. 31°57′36″N 90°59′17″W	Port Gibson	
14	Golden West Cemetery		July 22, 1979 (#79003417)	Rodney Rd. 31°57′26″N 90°59′30″W	Port Gibson	
15	Grand Gulf Military State Park	Grand Gulf Military State Park	April 11, 1972 (#72000689)	6 miles west of Port Gibson; 31°31′58″N 91°03′00″W	Port Gibson	
16	Idlewild	Idlewild	July 22, 1979 (#79003416)	310 Idlewild Dr. 31°57′00″N 90°59′14″W	Port Gibson	
17	Jewish Cemetery	Jewish Cemetery	July 22, 1979 (#79003415)	900 Marginal St. 31°57′22″N 90°58′45″W	Port Gibson	
18	Market Street-Suburb Ste. Mary Historic District	Market Street-Suburb Ste. Mary Historic District	July 22, 1979 (#79003410)	Roughly bounded by Orange, Marginal, Greenwood, and Market Sts. 31°57′27″N 90°58′56″W	Port Gibson	
19	McGregor		July 22, 1979 (#79003424)	Mississippi Highway 547; 31°56′32″N 90°58′37″W	Port Gibson	
20	John Nelson Site	John Nelson Site	June 13, 1974 (#74001060)	Address restricted	Willows	
21	Oakland Chapel	Oakland Chapel	December 27, 1974 (#74001057)	Alcorn State University campus 31°52′33″N 91°08′22″W	Alcorn	
22	Old Brickyard Place		July 22, 1979 (#79003423)	Anthony St. 31°58′09″N 90°59′29″W	Port Gibson	
23	Old Depot Restaurant and Lounge	Old Depot Restaurant and Lounge	July 22, 1979 (#79003421)	1202 Market St. 31°57′20″N 90°59′15″W	Port Gibson	
24	Old Natchez Trace (132-3T)	Old Natchez Trace (132-3T)	November 7, 1976 (#76000161)	Northeast of Port Gibson at milepost 45.8 of the Natchez Trace Parkway; 32°00′10″N 90°53′46″W	Port Gibson	An original segment of the Natchez Trace.
25	Owens Creek Bridge		November 16, 1988 (#88002398)	Spans Owen Creek on an old county road 32°05′29″N 90°43′45″W	Utica	
26	Port Gibson Battle Site		April 5, 2005 (#05000461)	West of Port Gibson; 31°57′28″N 91°01′08″W	Port Gibson	
27	Port Gibson Battlefield		November 3, 1972 (#72000690)	4 miles west of Port Gibson; 31°57′28″N 91°01′08″W	Port Gibson	
28	Port Gibson High School (Old)		May 17, 2016 (#16000285)	161 Ramsey Dr. 31°57′07″N 90°59′13″W	Port Gibson	
29	Port Gibson Oil Works Mill Building		July 22, 1979 (#79003422)	Anthony St. 31°57′55″N 90°59′26″W	Port Gibson	
30	Sacred Heart Roman Catholic Church	Sacred Heart Roman Catholic Church	November 23, 1987 (#73002241)	Grand Gulf Military Monument Park; 32°02′00″N 91°03′11″W	Port Gibson	
31	Smithfield Site	Smithfield Site	June 9, 1978 (#78001595)	Address restricted	Bruinsburg	
32	Van Dorn House	Van Dorn House	June 21, 1971 (#71000446)	Van Dorn Dr. 31°56′24″N 91°02′15″W	Port Gibson	
33	Widow's Creek Bridge		November 16, 1988 (#88002409)	Spans Widow's Creek on a county road 31°56′30″N 91°03′03″W	Port Gibson	
34	Windsor Ruins	Windsor Ruins	November 23, 1971 (#71000447)	12 miles southwest of Port Gibson on Mississippi Highway 552; 31°56′26″N 91°07′46″W	Port Gibson	
35	Windsor Site	Windsor Site	February 7, 1979 (#79003126)	Address restricted	Port Gibson	
36	Wintergreen Cemetery	Wintergreen Cemetery	July 22, 1979 (#79003414)	E. Greenwood St. 31°57′05″N 90°58′45″W	Port Gibson	

== Former listing ==
	Name on the Register	Image	Date listed	Date removed	Location	City or town	Description
1	Hollyrood		July 22, 1979 (#79003413)	January 31, 1992	Old Hwy. 61 S	Port Gibson	Destroyed by fire on March 5, 1990.
2	Valley of the Moon Bridge		June 8, 2005 (#05000561)	September 28, 2017	Willows Rd. at its crossing of Bayou Pierre, 2 miles southeast of Willows; 32°01′03″N 90°52′37″W	Port Gibson	Replaced in 2011.

== See also ==
- List of National Historic Landmarks in Mississippi
- National Register of Historic Places listings in Mississippi
