= Bethel Presbyterian Church (Alcorn, Mississippi) =

Historic church in Mississippi, United States

- U.S. National Register of Historic Places
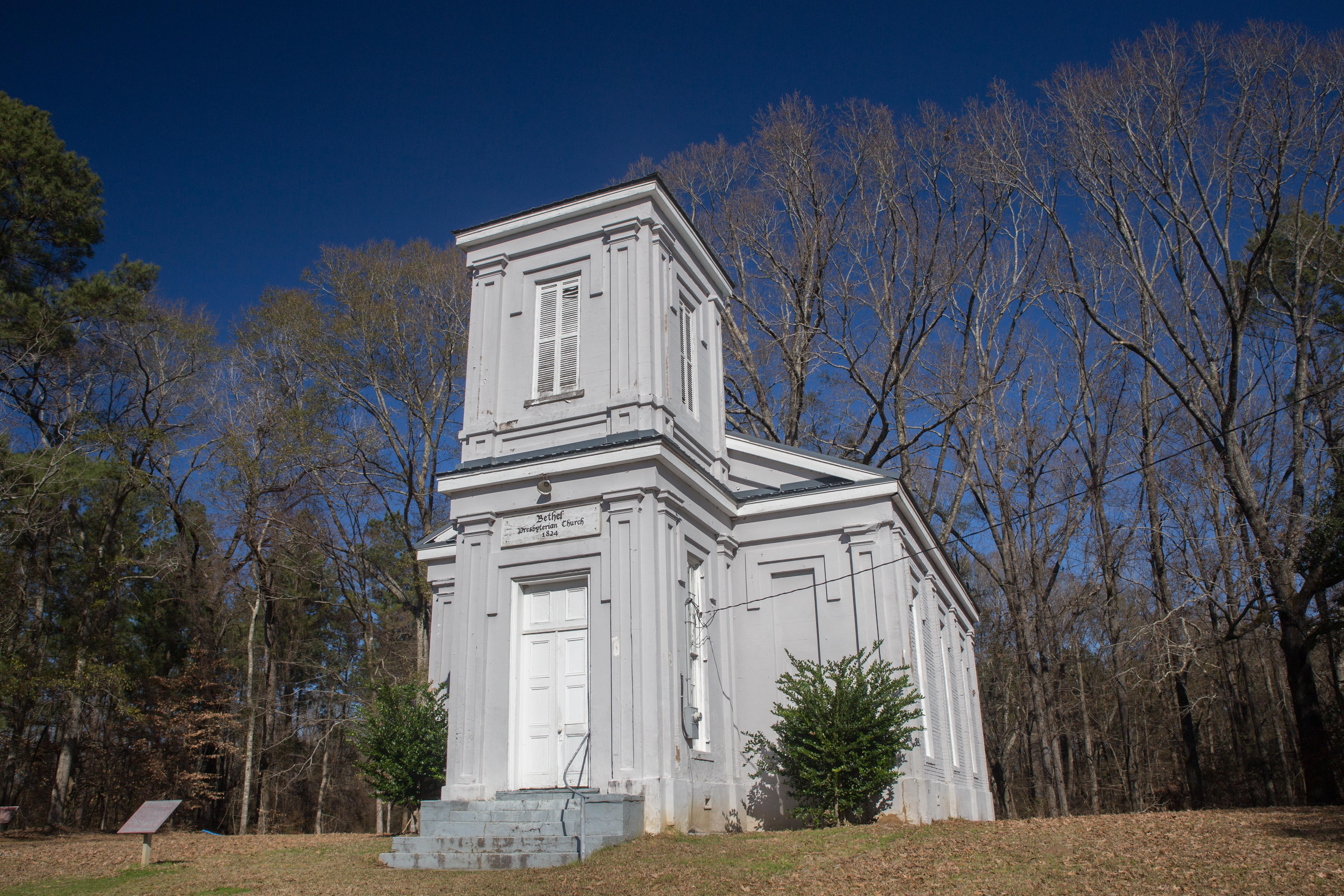

- Location within Mississippi Location within the United States
- Nearest city: Alcorn, Mississippi
- Coordinates: 31°54′21″N 91°7′44″W
- Area: 1.5 acres (0.61 ha)
- Built: 1828
- Architectural style: Greek Revival
- NRHP reference No.: 78001594
- Added to NRHP: November 28, 1978

Bethel Presbyterian Church is a historic Presbyterian church in Alcorn, Mississippi.

== Location ==
The church is located in what is now known as Alcorn in Claiborne County, Mississippi. It is one mile North of the Antebellum Canemount Plantation and nearly three miles South of the former Windsor Plantation, now known as the Windsor Ruins.

== History ==
The congregation was established in 1826. Its pastor was Jeremiah Chamberlain. The current building was built in the 1840s.

== Heritage significance ==
It has been listed the National Register of Historic Places since 1978.
