= Canemount Plantation =

Historic plantation in Lorman, Mississippi, US

Coordinates: 31.894343°N 91.126641°W

The Canemount Plantation is a historic Southern plantation in Lorman, Mississippi.

== Location ==
It is located on Route 2 in the town of Lorman, in Jefferson County, Mississippi. It is one mile north of the town of Alcorn and four miles away the Windsor Ruins. It spans 10,000 acres of land.

== History ==
The plantation mansion was built for the Murdoch family in 1855. It was designed in the Italianate Revival architectural style. Four outbuildings were also built prior to the Civil War, some as early as 1826, including a barn and a slave cabin.

It is now owned by the MDWFP. The state has turned the property into the Canemount Wildlife Management Area. This site has approx. 3500 AC that is now open to the public hunting through WMA draw hunt permits.
