= Augustus McCalib Byrnes =

Augustus McCalib Byrnes (July 21, 1871 – March 22, 1939) was a politician in Mississippi who served in the Mississippi Senate. A farmer, he lived in Carlisle, Mississippi. He was Episcopalian.

He was born in Claiborne County, Mississippi.
