= Alcorn State University Historic District =

Historic district in Mississippi, United States

- U.S. National Register of Historic Places
- U.S. Historic district
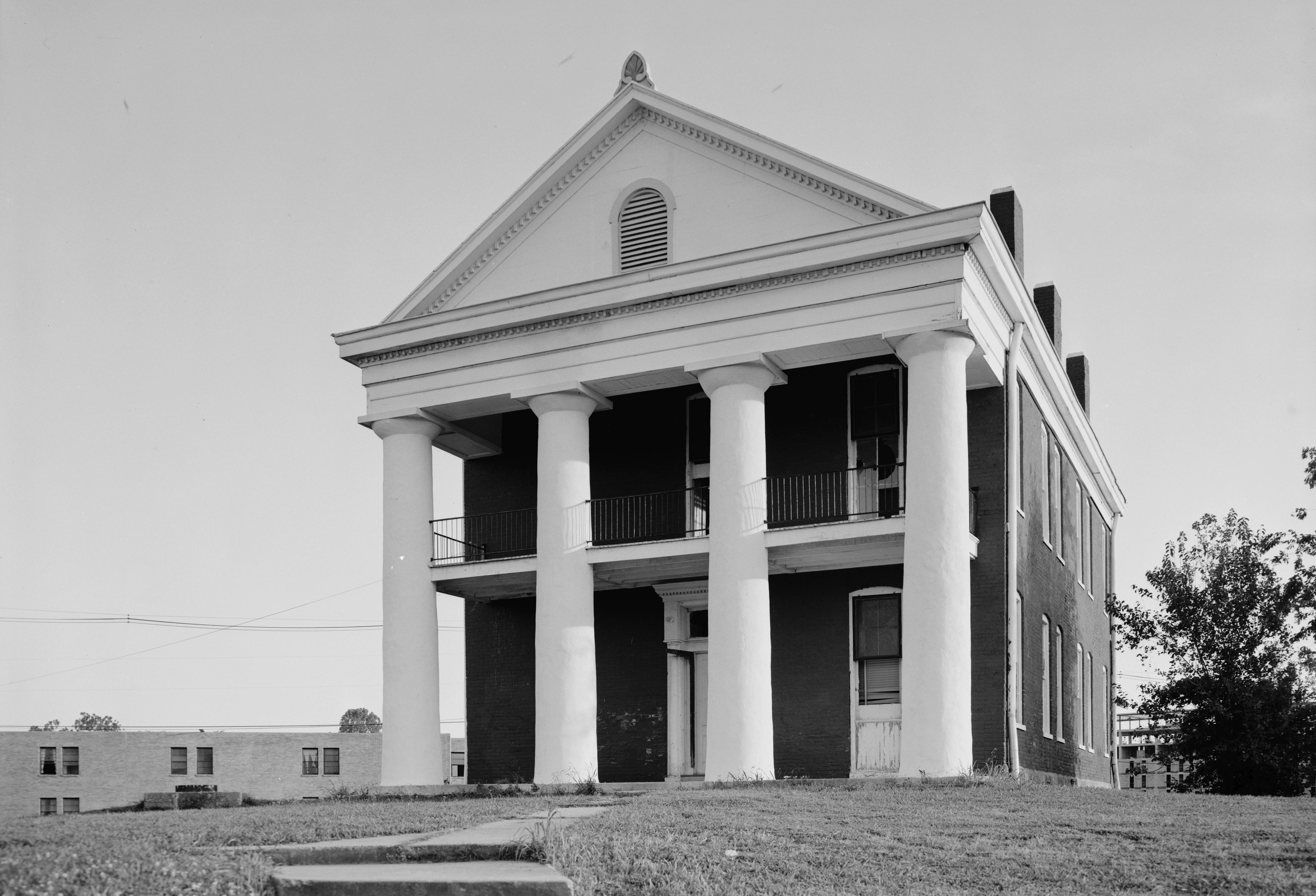
- Main façade of Belles Lettres, 1972

- Location within Mississippi
- Location: Alcorn State University campus, Lorman, Mississippi
- Coordinates: 31°52′32″N 91°8′59″W
- Area: 10 acres (4.0 ha)
- Built: 1838–1939
- Architect: Multiple
- Architectural style: Greek Revival, Federal, Colonial Revival
- NRHP reference No.: 82003098
- Added to NRHP: May 20, 1982

Alcorn State University Historic District is a historic district on the campus of Alcorn State University in rural Claiborne County, Mississippi, northwest of Lorman. It includes Oakland Memorial Chapel, a National Historic Landmark and seven other buildings.

== History ==
Rowan and Martin were two graduates who served as college presidents in the early 1900s and greatly improved the campus. L. J. Rowan was president from 1905 to 1911 and again from 1915 to 1934. J. A. Martin was president from 1911 to 1915.

== Buildings and sites ==
It includes eight contributing buildings:

- Administration Building (1928)
- Harmon Hall (1929)
- Lanier Hall (1939), Colonial Revival.
- Oakland College, Greek Revival:
  - Belles Lettres (c. 1855)
  - Dormitory No. 2 (c. 1855)
  - Dormitory No. 3 (c. 1855)
  - Oakland Chapel (c. 1838)
- President's House (c. 1930)

The 1959 Library and Science Building is an intrusion in the district.

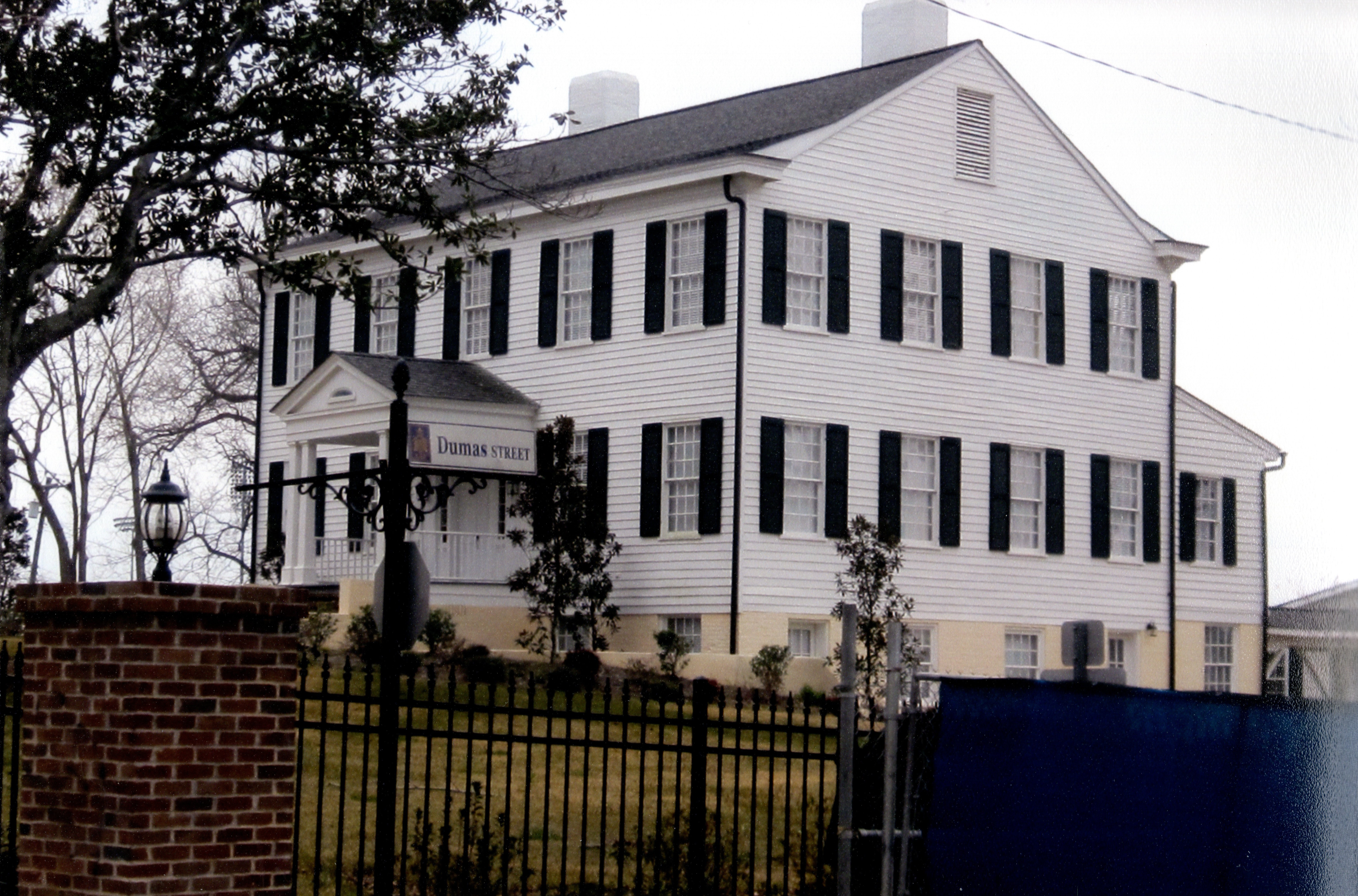
Alcorn State University President's House, 2013

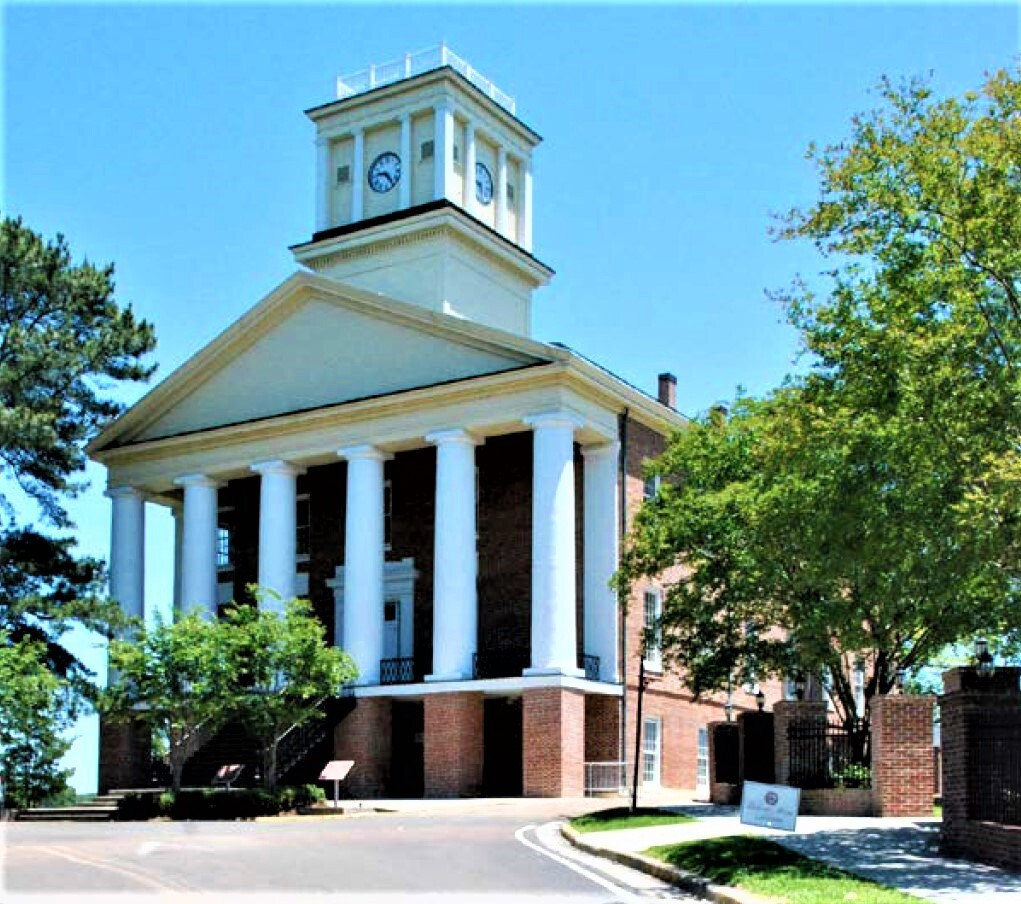
The Oakland Memorial Chapel - now a part of Alcorn State University
