= Henry Dwight =

Henry Dwight may refer to:

- Henry Otis Dwight (1843–1917), American missionary
- Henry W. Dwight (1788–1845), U.S. Representative from Massachusetts

== See also ==
- Henry Dwight Sedgwick, American lawyer and author
