= Canemount =

Historic house in Mississippi, United States

- U.S. National Register of Historic Places
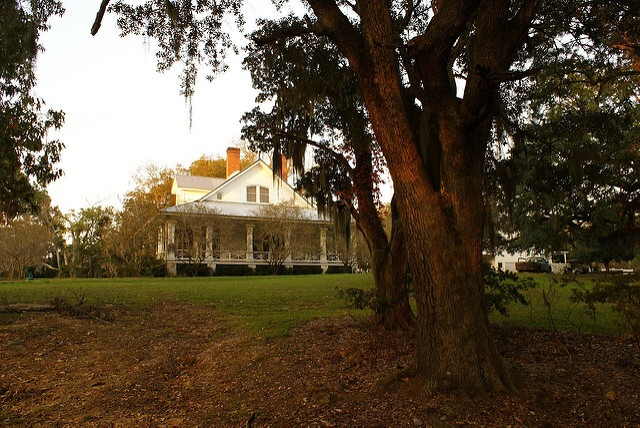
- Canemount in 2014

- Location within Mississippi
- Nearest city: Alcorn, Mississippi
- Coordinates: 31°53′40″N 91°7′34″W
- Area: 8.3 acres (3.4 ha)
- Architectural style: Italianate
- NRHP reference No.: 82000572
- Added to NRHP: December 2, 1982

Canemount is a 1,100-acre plantation with a historic mansion in Alcorn, Mississippi, U.S., a mile and a half away from Alcorn State University. It has been listed on the National Register of Historic Places since December 2, 1982.
