= Manning Ferguson Force =

American judge and soldier (1824–1899)

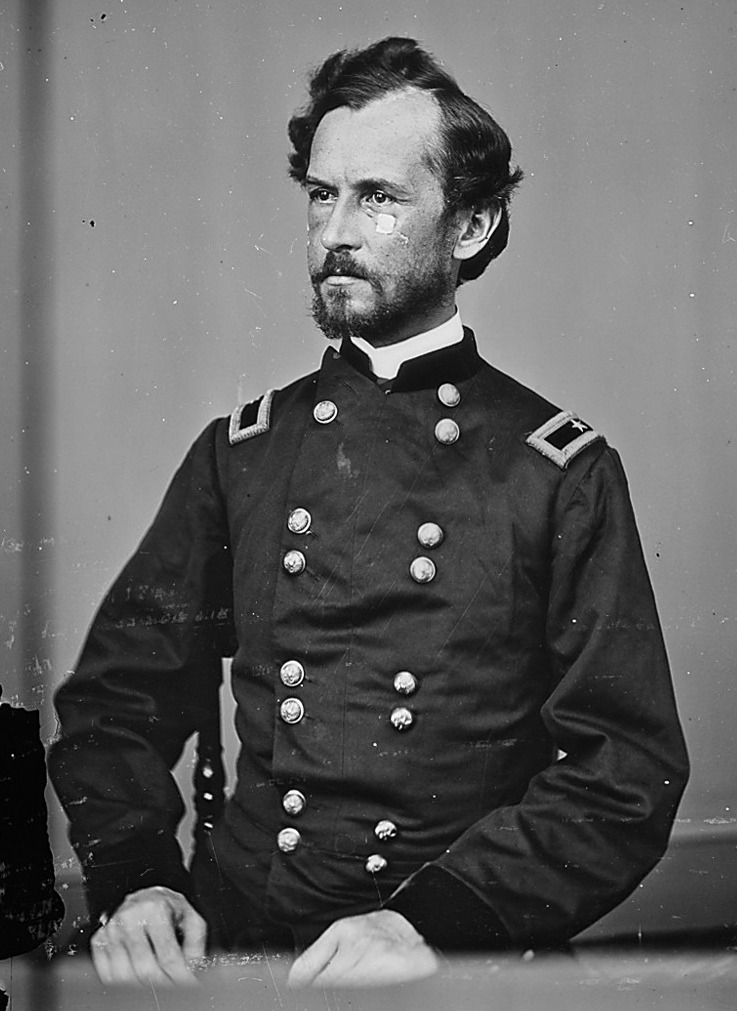
- BGEN Manning Ferguson Force c1864
- Born: December 17, 1824; Washington, D.C.
- Died: May 8, 1899 (aged 74); Cincinnati, Ohio
- Burial place: Spring Grove Cemetery, Cincinnati, Ohio
- Military career
- Allegiance: United States of America; Union
- Branch: United States Army; Union Army
- Service years: 1861–1866
- Rank: Brigadier General; Brevet Major General
- Unit: 20th Ohio Volunteer Infantry Regiment
- Commands: 20th Ohio Volunteer Infantry Regiment
- Conflicts: American Civil War
- Awards: Medal of Honor

Manning Ferguson Force (December 17, 1824 – May 8, 1899) was a lawyer, judge, and soldier from Ohio. He became known as the commander of the 20th Ohio Volunteer Infantry in the Union Army during the American Civil War, and was a recipient of the Army Medal of Honor for gallantry in action. He was awarded this honor in 1892 for his heroism during the Battle of Atlanta, on July 22, 1864. He was a justice of the Superior Court of Cincinnati.

== Early life and career ==
Manning F. Force was born in Washington, D.C., where his father, Peter Force, was the mayor. He turned down an appointment to West Point and went on to attended Harvard College until 1845, and graduated from Harvard Law School in 1848. The following year, Force moved to Cincinnati, Ohio, and began his law practice.

== Civil War ==
With the outbreak of the Civil War in 1861, Force joined the Union forces as major of the 20th Ohio Volunteer Infantry, serving in the Western Theater as part of General James B. McPherson's 17th Corps.

Colonel Force's 20th Ohio bore the brunt of the Battle of Raymond, Mississippi, in the Vicksburg Campaign. Osborn Oldroyd related the number of casualties from the 20th Ohio to his commander:

I took the roll-book from the pocket of our dead sergeant and found that while we had gone in with thirty-two men, we came out with but sixteen— one-half of the brave little band, but a few hours before so full of hope and patriotism, either killed or wounded. Nearly all the survivors could show bullet marks in clothing or flesh, but no man left the field on account of wounds. When I told Colonel Force of our loss, I saw tears course down his cheeks, and so intent were his thoughts upon his fallen men that he failed to note the bursting of a shell above him, scattering the powder over his person, as he sat at the foot of a tree.

Following the Siege of Vicksburg, Force marched on to northern Georgia, where he fought in the Atlanta campaign. He was severely wounded in the face during the Battle of Atlanta and was disfigured for life. For his valor during the Atlanta Campaign, Force was promoted to major general of volunteers in March 1865. Following the Battle of Atlanta, he participated in Sherman's March to the Sea.

The thirty-seven-year-old lawyer began the conflict as a major and ended as a brevetted major general. Sgt. Osborn Oldroyd noted his leadership when he wrote in his diary: As Colonel Force called us to 'Attention' this morning one of the boys remarked, 'I love that man more than ever.' Yes, we have good reason to be proud of our Colonel, for upon all occasions we are treated by him as volunteers enlisted in war from pure love of country. ... " In his memoirs printed after the war, Force stated:

When lying there (in the trenches outside Vicksburg) it sometimes occurred to me, what a transformation it was for these men, full of individuality and self-reliance, accustomed always to act upon their own will, to so completely subordinate their wills to the wills of other men ... Their practical sense had told them an army differs from a mob only in discipline, and discipline was necessary for self-preservation.

== Postbellum activities ==
After the war, Force returned to Cincinnati, where he became a justice of the Superior Court of Cincinnati. He also authored several law books and became a prominent writer as well as a lecturer. He was a companion of the Ohio Commandery of the Military Order of the Loyal Legion of the United States.

In 1892, he received the Medal of Honor.

Manning Force is buried in Spring Grove Cemetery in Cincinnati. His papers and documents are housed in the Manning Ferguson Force Collection of the Rutherford B. Hayes Presidential Center.

=== Medal of Honor citation ===
Rank and organization: Brigadier General, U.S. Volunteers. Place and date: At Atlanta, Ga., July 22, 1864. Entered service at: Cincinnati, Ohio. Born: Washington, D.C. December 17, 1824. Date of issue: March 31, 1892.

Citation:

The President of the United States of America, in the name of Congress, takes pleasure in presenting the Medal of Honor to Brigadier General Manning Ferguson Force, United States Army, for extraordinary heroism on 22 July 1864, while serving with U.S. Volunteers, in action at Atlanta, Georgia. Brigadier General Force charged upon the enemy's works, and after their capture defended his position against assaults of the enemy until he was severely wounded.

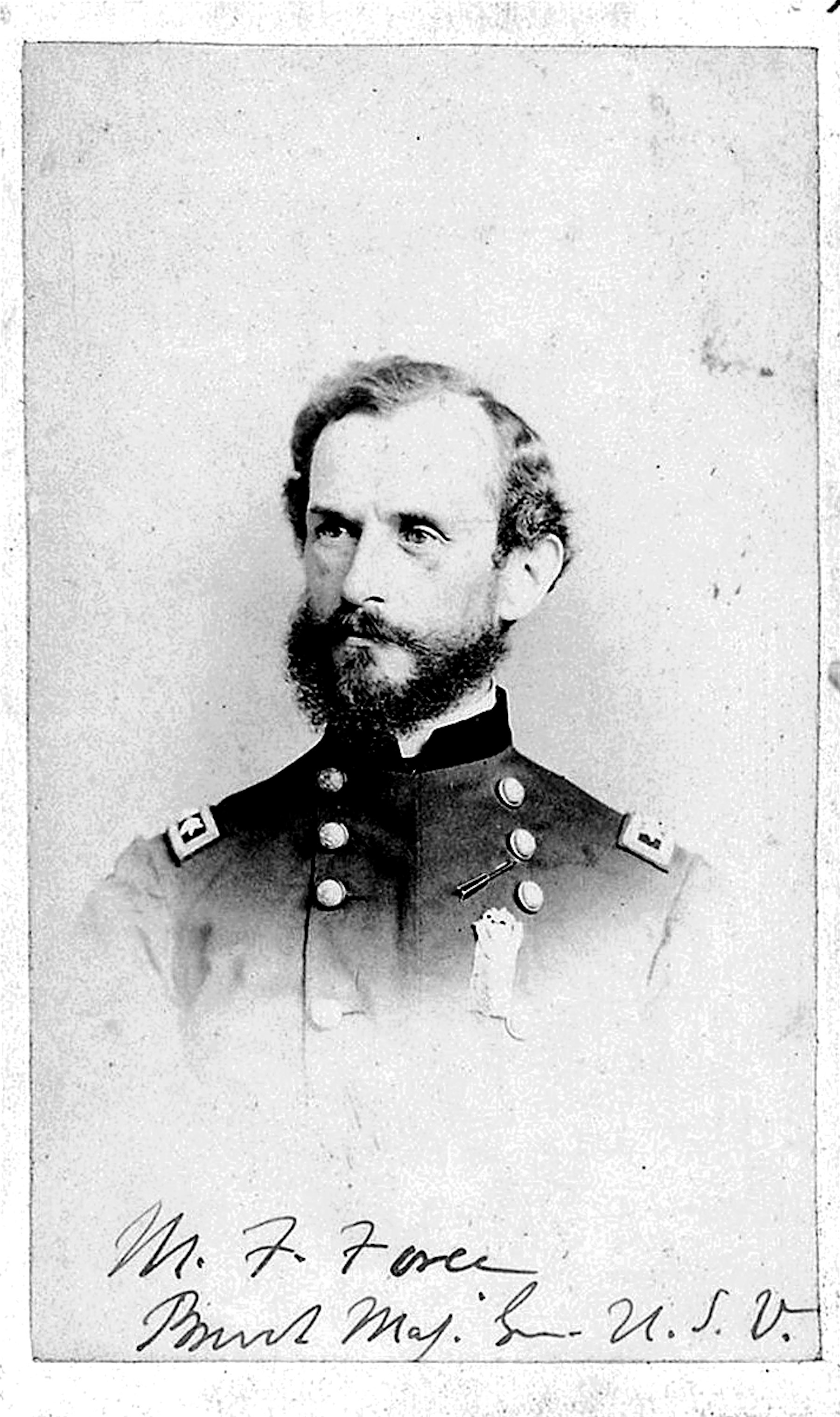
Medal of Honor recipient Manning Ferguson Force, Brevet MGEN USV c1865

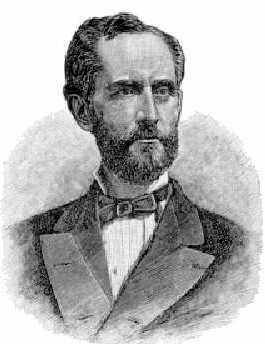
Manning Force, pen and ink from Osborn H. I. Oldroyd, A Soldier's Story of the Siege of Vicksburg, 1885

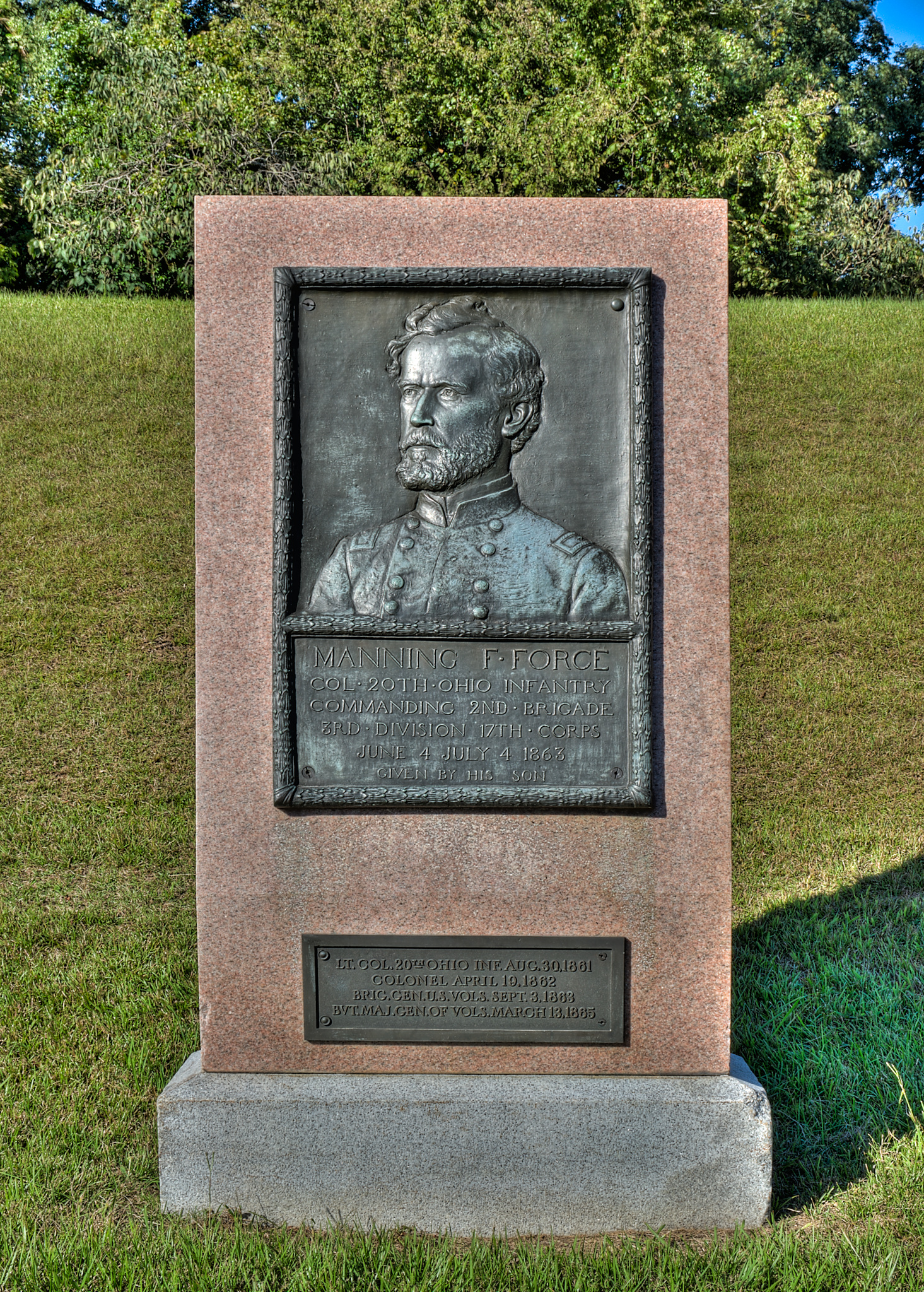
Bust by T.A.R. Kitson at Vicksburg National Military Park

== See also ==
- List of American Civil War Medal of Honor recipients: A–F
- List of American Civil War generals (Union)
