= Henry Otis Dwight =

American missionary and author (1843–1917)

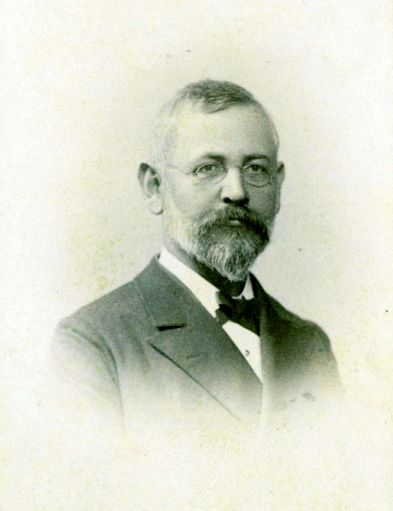
- Henry Otis Dwight, ca. 1875
- Born: June 3, 1843; Constantinople, Turkey
- Died: June 19, 1917 (aged 74); Roselle, New Jersey
- Occupations: missionary, author
- Parent(s): Father: Harrison Gray Otis Dwight; Mother: Mary Lane

Henry Otis Dwight, LL.D. (June 3, 1843 – June 19, 1917), was an American missionary and author.

== Biography ==
Henry Dwight was born in Constantinople, Turkey, the only son of Harrison Gray Otis Dwight. He entered Ohio Wesleyan University but left college in 1861 to enlist in the 20th Ohio Regiment and serve in the American Civil War.

=== Military ===
In the spring of 1863, Dwight was part of Grant's invasion of Mississippi at Bruinsburg on the Mississippi River. The invasion preceded the Battle of Port Gibson, and Union troops had taken control of Windsor mansion, where Dwight sketched the only known drawing of the antebellum home.

During the war, Dwight participated in more than thirty engagements, including the siege of Vicksburg (1863), the Atlanta campaign (1864), and the Savannah Campaign (1864). Shortly before the war ended, Dwight was commissioned a captain and left the military in 1865.

=== Missionary ===
In 1867, Dwight returned to Istanbul as a missionary for the American Board of Commissioners for Foreign Missions, where he edited publications of the Turkish language. For 15 years, in the late 1800s, he was the correspondent in Constantinople for the New York Tribune. During the Armenian Massacres of 1894–1896, Dwight had responsibility for guarding missionary interests in Turkey.

He was ordained a minister in 1880, and returned to the United States in 1901, after resigning his commission as a missionary. In 1897, Dwight was conferred the honorary degree of LL.D. by Amherst College. He edited the Report of the Ecumenical Conference on Foreign Missions (1900) and the Encyclopedia of Missions (1904). He was the author of several books:

- Turkish Life in War Time (1881)
- Treaty Rights of American Missionaries in Turkey (1893)
- Constantinople and its Problems (1901)
- Blue Book of Missions (1905; second edition, 1907)
- A Moslem Sir Galahad (1913; second edition, 1914)

=== Personal life ===
Henry Dwight was married three times: Mary Bliss (m. 1867–d. 1872) to, Ardelle Griswold (m. 1874–d. 1884), and Isabella Bliss (m. 1887–d. 1894). He was the father of one son and five daughters.

Dwight died June 19, 1917, at his home in Roselle, New Jersey.
