= Carlisle, Mississippi =

- Unincorporated community
- Location within Mississippi Location within the United States
- Coordinates: 32°00′10″N 90°47′04″W
- Country: United States
- State: Mississippi
- County: Claiborne
- Elevation: 121 ft (37 m)
- Time zone: UTC-6 (Central (CST))
  - Summer (DST): UTC-5 (CDT)
- Area codes: 601 & 769
- GNIS feature ID: 691750

Carlisle is an unincorporated community in Claiborne County, Mississippi, United States.

The Bayou Pierre, a tributary to the Mississippi River, flows north of the community.

Carlisle is located on the former Natchez, Jackson and Columbus Railroad, completed in 1882. Known locally as "The Little J", the line ran between Jackson and Natchez, and had various owners, including the Illinois Central Railroad, which abandoned it between 1979 and 1981.

Carlisle was once home to a cotton gin and school. Two general stores were also located in Carlisle.

A post office first began operation under the name Carlisle in 1884.

== Education ==
Carlisle is served by the Claiborne County School District.

== Notable people ==
- Augustus McCalib Byrnes, politician
- Ephren Taylor, self-made teen millionaire; accused by U.S. Securities and Exchange Commission in 2012 of running an $11 million Ponzi scheme aimed at African-American churchgoers.
