= Henry Casey =

American Civil War Medal of Honor recipient

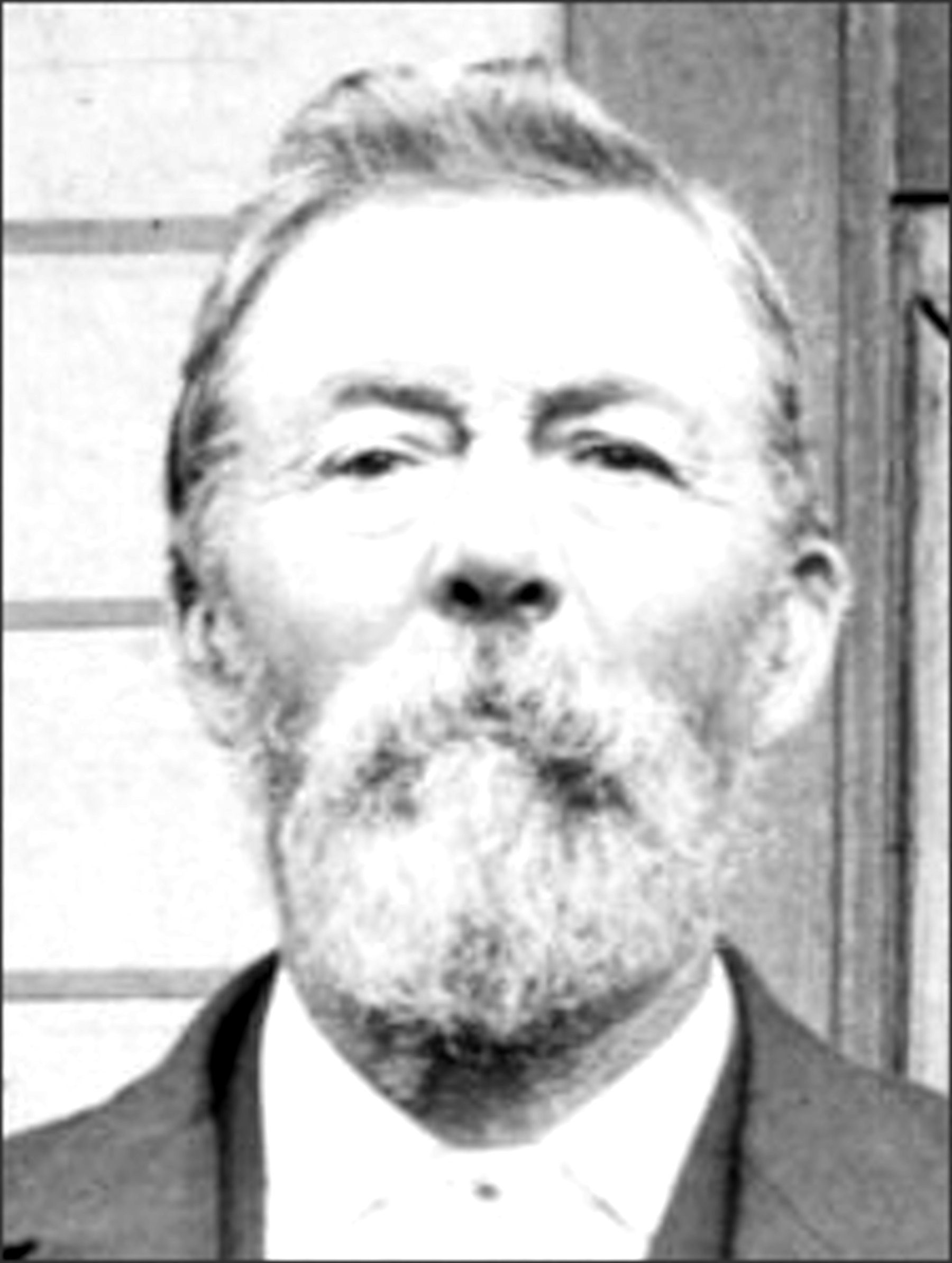
- Casey in 1895
- Born: October 28, 1837; New Geneva, Pennsylvania
- Died: May 9, 1919 (aged 81); Bloomingburg, Ohio
- Burial place: Bloomingburg Cemetery
- Military career
- Allegiance: United States of America
- Branch: United States Army
- Rank: Private
- Unit: 20th Regiment Ohio Volunteer Infantry - Company C
- Conflicts: Battle of Vicksburg
- Awards: Medal of Honor

Private Henry Casey (October 28, 1837 to May 9, 1919) was an American soldier who fought in the American Civil War. Casey received the country's highest award for bravery during combat, the Medal of Honor, for his action during the Battle of Vicksburg in Mississippi on 22 April 1863. He was honored with the award on 23 September 1897.

== Biography ==
Casey was born in New Geneva, Pennsylvania on 28 October 1837. He enlisted into the 20th Ohio Infantry. He died on 9 May 1919 and his remains are interred at the Bloomingburg Cemetery in Ohio.

== Medal of Honor citation ==
Voluntarily served as one of the crew of a transport that passed the forts under a heavy fire.

== See also ==
- List of American Civil War Medal of Honor recipients: A–F
