= Idlewild (Port Gibson, Mississippi) =

Historic house in Mississippi, United States

- U.S. National Register of Historic Places
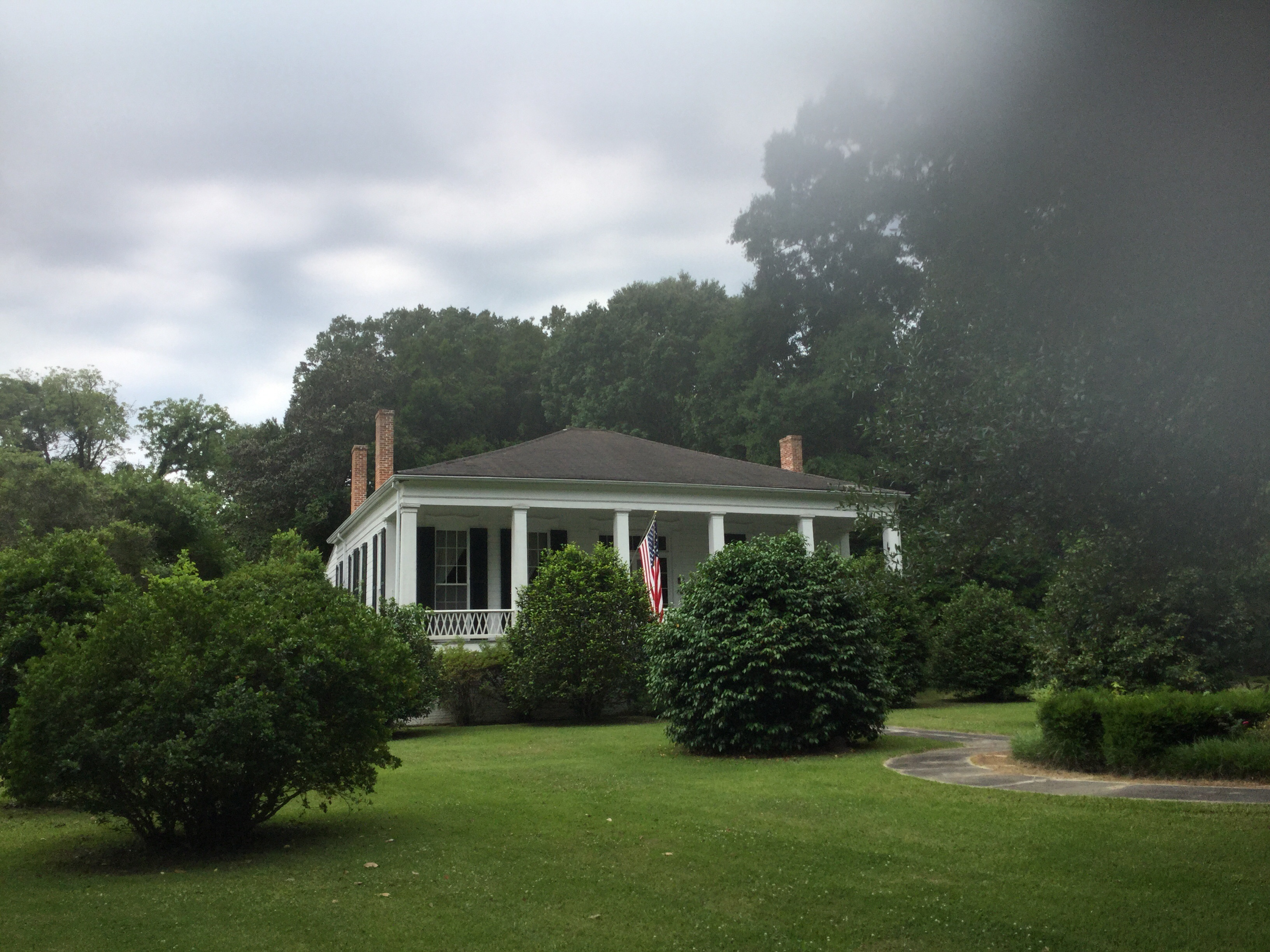
- Idlewild in 2015

- Location within Mississippi
- Location: 310 Idlewild Dr., Port Gibson, Mississippi
- Coordinates: 31°57′0″N 90°59′14″W
- Area: 3 acres (1.2 ha)
- Built: 1830
- Architectural style: Greek Revival
- MPS: Port Gibson MRA
- NRHP reference No.: 79003416
- Added to NRHP: July 22, 1979

Idlewild is a historic house in Port Gibson, Mississippi, U.S. It has been listed on the National Register of Historic Places since July 22, 1979.
