= Peyton, Claiborne County, Mississippi =

Peyton, Mississippi
- Unincorporated community
- Location within Mississippi Location within the United States
- Coordinates: 31°50′16″N 90°48′08″W
- Country: United States
- State: Mississippi
- County: Claiborne
- Elevation: 266 ft (81 m)
- Time zone: UTC-6 (Central (CST))
  - Summer (DST): UTC-5 (CDT)
- GNIS feature ID: 694352

Peyton is an unincorporated community in Claiborne County, Mississippi, United States.

Peyton had a post office from 1900 to 1935.

The Peyton Lookout Tower is located east of the settlement.
