= Port Gibson Battlefield =

- Port Gibson Battle Site
- U.S. National Register of Historic Places
- U.S. National Historic Landmark
- Location within Mississippi Location within the United States
- Nearest city: Port Gibson, Mississippi
- Coordinates: 31°57′28″N 91°1′8″W
- Area: 2,080 acres (840 ha) (1972 listing); 3,400 acres (1,400 ha) (2005 landmark designation)
- NRHP reference No.: 72000690, 05000461

Significant dates
- Added to NRHP: November 3, 1972
- Designated NHL: April 5, 2005

The Port Gibson Battlefield is the site near Port Gibson, Mississippi where the 1863 Battle of Port Gibson was fought during the American Civil War. The battlefield covers about 3,400 acres (1,400 ha) of land west of the city, astride Rodney Road, where Union Army forces were establishing a beachhead after crossing the Mississippi River in a bid to take the Confederate fortress of Vicksburg. The Union victory secured that beachhead and paved the way for the eventual fall of Vicksburg. A 2,080-acre (840 ha) area surrounding part of the site was listed on the National Register of Historic Places in 1972, and a larger area was designated a National Historic Landmark in 2005. In 2009, the battlefield was designated by the Civil War Preservation Trust as one of its Top 10 most endangered Civil War battlefields. In 2011, the Civil War Preservation Trust was renamed the Civil War Trust, which in 2018 became a division of the American Battlefield Trust. The Trust and its partners have acquired and preserved 644 acres (2.61 km^{2}) of the Port Gibson battlefield.

== Description ==
The battlefield area is about 4 miles (6.4 km) west of Port Gibson. The terrain is a tangle of ravines and terraces, caused by the soil type (sedimentary loess) and a history of intensive agricultural use up to the 20th century. The area is now largely wooded, with a scattering of non-historic houses and other buildings, mainly along Rodney Road which roughly bisects the battlefield. The only surviving historic structure is the Shaifer plantation house, which is where the battle began. At the time of the battle in 1863, the terraces of the area would have been in agriculture, with the ravines filled with dense jungle-like growth.

After a number of failed attempts to reach Vicksburg from the north and northeast, Union General Ulysses S. Grant decided to march his army down the west side of the Mississippi River, past Vicksburg, and locate a crossing area from which he could reach the city from the south. A crossing point at Bruinsburg, just south of the mouth of Bayou Pierre, was described as suitable for the army's use, and on April 30, 1863 Grant began what was then one of the largest amphibious military operations in United States history. The initial landing was unopposed, and Grant moved quickly to secure the beachhead, moving troops up the road toward Port Gibson. These met with Confederate defenders under the command of General John S. Bowen at the Shaifer plantation on May 1, with the Union forces victorious in a daylong bloody battle. The victory was key in setting the foundation for Grant's successful conclusion to the Vicksburg Campaign.

The surviving Shaifer plantation house is now owned by the state.

== See also ==
- List of National Historic Landmarks in Mississippi
- National Register of Historic Places listings in Claiborne County, Mississippi
