= Harrison Gray Otis Dwight =

American Congregational missionary (1803–1862)

Harrison Gray Otis Dwight (1803–1862) was an American Congregational missionary.

== Biography ==
Harrison Gray Otis Dwight was born on November 22, 1803, in Conway, Massachusetts. His father was Seth Dwight (1769–1825) and mother was Hannah Strong (1768–1813).

He graduated from Hamilton College in 1825 and went on to study theology at Andover Theological Seminary where he graduated in 1828. He married Elizabeth Barker (1806–1837) on January 4, 1828. She died of bubonic plague in 1837 with her third son. They were both buried in the Protestant cemetery of San Stefano (now Yeşilköy), in Istanbul. He was ordained on July 15, 1829, as a missionary for the American Board of Commissioners for Foreign Missions. He was sent to assist in the Armenian missions serving in Istanbul for over 30 years. He wrote: Christianity Revived in the East (1850). In 1856, Dwight published a "Manual of Christian Theology" in Constantinople in association with George Warren Wood and Rev. Dr. Edward Riggs.

== Family ==
Children from his first marriage to Elizabeth Barker were:

1. James Harrison Dwight was born October 9, 1830, on Malta.
2. William Buck Dwight was born May 22, 1833, at Constantinople, Ottoman Empire.
3. John White Dwight was born December 4, 1834, but died on June 29, 1837.
4. Charles Parmelee Dwight was born February 25, 1837, but died February 18, 1853.

He married Mary Lane (1811–1860) on April 6, 1839. Their children were:

1. Mary Tappan Dwight was born August 19, 1840, but died July 5, 1847.
2. Henry Otis Dwight was born June 3, 1843, and died in 1917.
3. Cornelia Porter Dwight was born November 12, 1846, and also became a missionary to Turkey.
4. Sarah Hinsdale Dwight was born July 17, 1848, married Reverend Edward Riggs, the son of Elias Riggs (1810–1901) in 1869, who also became a missionary to Turkey.
5. Susan Elizabeth Dwight was born February 6, 1851, and died on July 13, 1870.

His older sister Harriet Dwight (1792–1870) married James Dana, and their son was geologist James Dwight Dana (1813–1895). He died on January 25, 1862.
