= Port Gibson Oil Works Mill Building =

- U.S. National Register of Historic Places
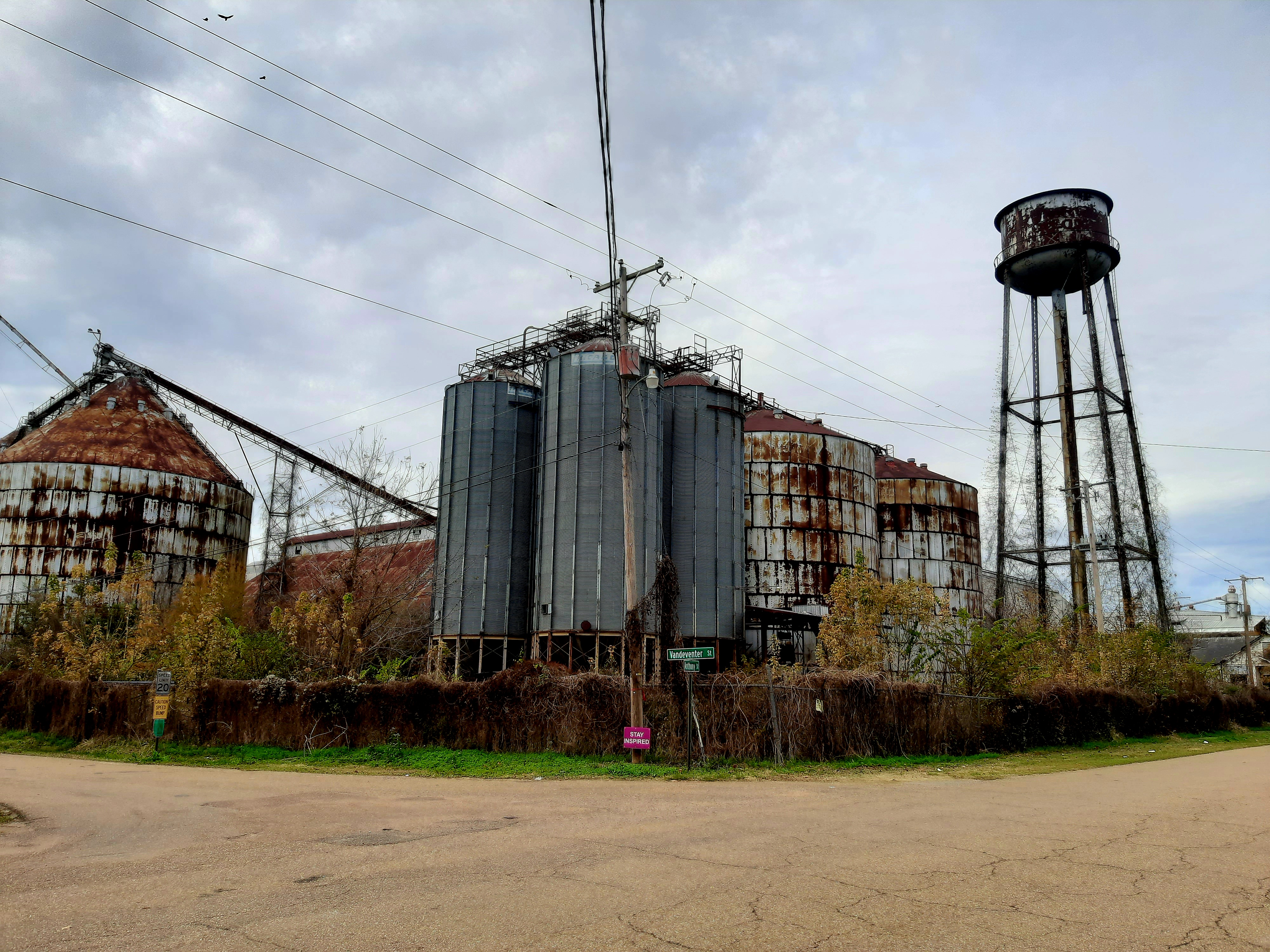
- Port Gibson Oil Works, as seen from the intersection of Anthony St. and Vandeventer St.

- Location within Mississippi Location within the United States
- Location: Anthony Street; Port Gibson, Mississippi
- Coordinates: 31°57′55″N 90°59′26″W
- Area: 6,600 sq ft (610 m^{2})
- Built: 1882
- MPS: Port Gibson MRA
- NRHP reference No.: 79003422
- Added to NRHP: July 22, 1979

The Port Gibson Oil Works Mill Building is a historic industrial building for production of cottonseed oil located in Port Gibson, Mississippi, United States. Beginning operations in 1882, it is one of the earliest cottonseed crushing mills in the U.S. The two-story, brick mill building was still in operation as of 1979. Major parts of the interior machinery had been modernized in 1930 and 1955.

The building was entered on the National Register of Historic Places in 1979.

== See also ==
- National Register of Historic Places listings in Claiborne County, Mississippi
