= Sacred Heart Roman Catholic Church (Port Gibson, Mississippi) =

Historic church in Mississippi, United States

- U.S. National Register of Historic Places
- Mississippi Landmark
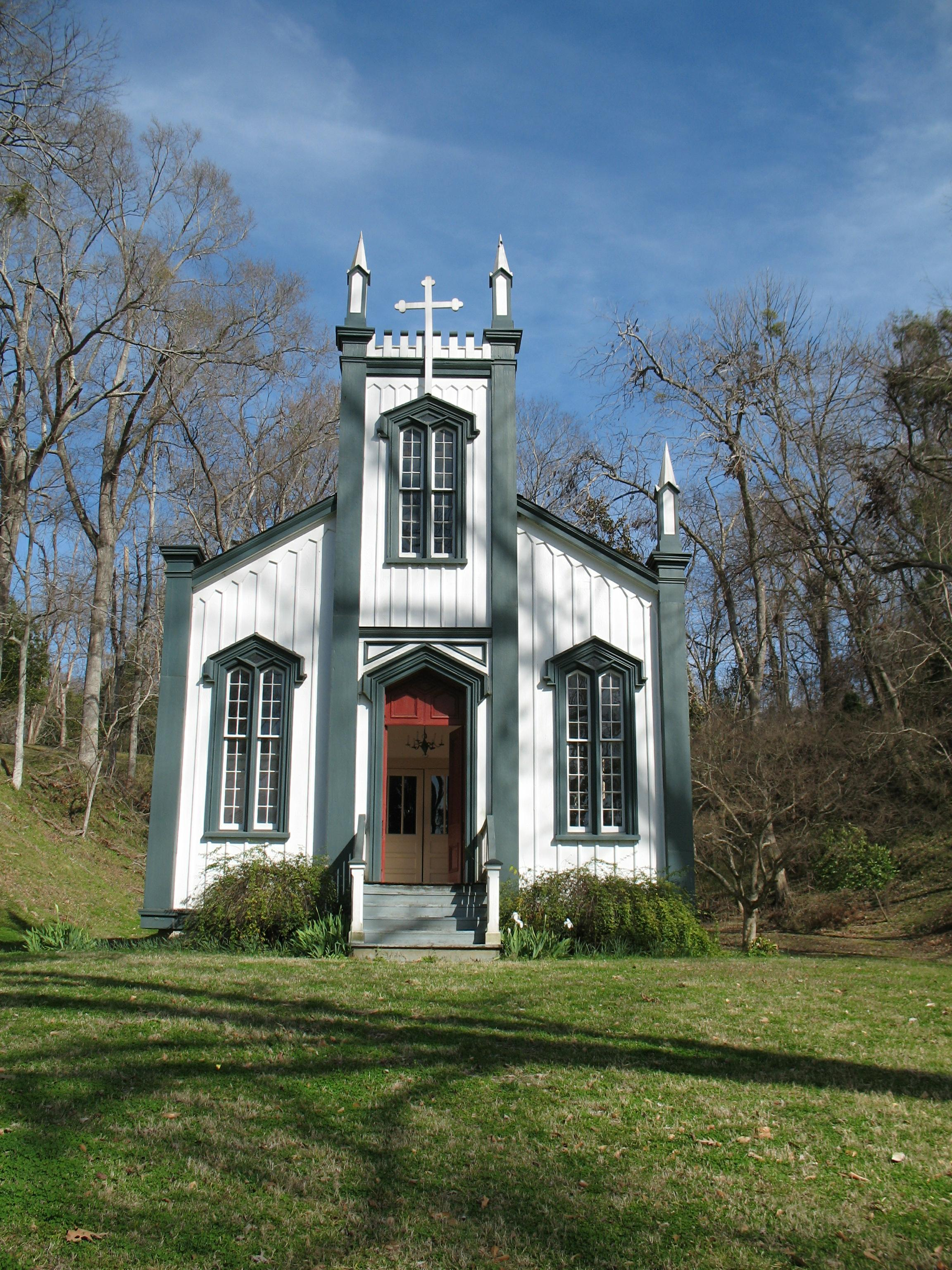
- Sacred Heart Roman Catholic Church in Grand Gulf Military State Park

- Location within Mississippi Location within the United States
- Nearest city: Port Gibson, Mississippi
- Coordinates: 32°2′0″N 91°3′11″W
- Built: 1868
- Architect: Patrick Murphy
- Architectural style: Carpenter Gothic
- NRHP reference No.: 73002241
- USMS No.: 021-GGF-0103-NR-ML

Significant dates
- Added to NRHP: November 23, 1987
- Designated USMS: October 11, 1985

Sacred Heart Roman Catholic Church, also known as Confederate Memorial Chapel and as the Sacred Heart Catholic Church, is a Gothic Revival style Christian church in Port Gibson, Mississippi. It was opened in 1868 as a Roman Catholic parish church but was closed for worship in 1937 due to the decline of the town. In 1983, it was moved and restored as a non-denominational chapel.

== History ==
The church was built in 1868 in the town of Rodney, Mississippi after a request was made by two local Catholic families to the Bishop of Natchez, William Henry Elder, for a place to worship. Local Catholic priests acquired the land in Rodney and the church was built. Due to the small congregation, the church was known as one of the most destitute within the diocese. In the 1870s, the church opened its own school but due to the cost draining church funds, they had to charge tuition fees which the community were not often able to afford. In the 1930s, the town had declined and by 1937, there were only seven regular worshippers attending services. As a result, the church was closed that year with services being discontinued.

The Diocese of Natchez-Jackson signed the deed for the church over to the Rodney Foundation in 1969. This was done for preservation due to it being considered a rare example of Carpenter Gothic architecture in Mississippi. In 1983, the Rodney Foundation donated the building to the state, which moved it to Grand Gulf Military State Park in Port Gibson, Mississippi. Once in the park, the church was restored to its original condition and is now used as a non-denominational chapel.

It was declared a Mississippi Landmark in 1985 and listed on the National Register of Historic Places in 1987.
