= Windsor Ruins =

Historic ruins in Mississippi, United States

- U.S. National Register of Historic Places
- Mississippi Landmark
- Windsor Ruins

- Location within Mississippi Location within the United States
- Location: Claiborne County, Mississippi
- Nearest city: Port Gibson, Mississippi
- Coordinates: 31°56′26″N 91°7′46″W
- Area: 2.1 acres (0.85 ha)
- Built: 1859-61
- Architectural style: Greek Revival, Italianate
- NRHP reference No.: 71000447
- USMS No.: 021-ALC-1001-NR-ML

Significant dates
- Added to NRHP: November 23, 1971
- Designated USMS: October 11, 1985

Windsor Ruins are in Claiborne County, Mississippi, United States, about 10 miles (16 km) southwest of Port Gibson near Alcorn State University. The ruins consist of 23 standing Corinthian columns of the largest antebellum Greek Revival mansion ever built in the state. The mansion stood from 1861 to 1890, when it was destroyed by fire. The 2.1-acre (0.85 ha) site with the columns was added to the National Register of Historic Places in 1971 and was designated a Mississippi Landmark in 1985.

== History ==
=== Background ===
Windsor mansion was located on a plantation that covered 2,600 acres (1,100 ha). As was common in the American South at the time, the mansion was constructed using a combination of skilled New England carpenters, northern masons, and enslaved African Americans between 1859 and 1861 for Smith Coffee Daniell II. He was born in Mississippi and had acquired great wealth by age 30 as a cotton planter. In 1849, Smith Daniell married his cousin Catherine Freeland (1830–1903). The couple had six children, with three surviving to adulthood.

=== Construction ===
Windsor mansion was built facing the Mississippi River, which formed the major transportation route. It was located about 4 mi (6.4 km) east of the river. The architect David Shroder supervised a crew of skilled artisans—carpenters, plasterers, masons, and painters—from Mississippi, northeastern states, and Europe to do finishing work on the mansion.

The footprint for Windsor mansion was set by 29 columns which supported a projected roof line that protected 9 ft (2.7 m) wide verandas on the second and third floors. The 29 columns were constructed of bricks that were covered with stucco. Each column was more than 3.5 ft (1.1 m) in diameter at the base and stood 40 ft (12 m) tall. The columns were constructed atop 10 ft (3.0 m) tall, paneled brick plinths that were almost 5 ft (1.5 m) square. Bricks were made in an onsite kiln. The fluted columns were crowned with ornate, iron Corinthian capitals. The columns were joined at the height of the third floor by ornamental iron balustrades.

Column capitals, balustrades, and four cast iron stairways were manufactured in St. Louis and shipped down the Mississippi River to the Port of Bruinsburg, about 2 mi (3.2 km) west of Windsor mansion.

=== Description ===
Windsor mansion was constructed as a three-story block, consisting of a ground floor basement, with living quarters on the second and third floors. The main block was 64 ft (20 m) on each side. A three-story ell projected from the east side of the main block. The ell measured 59 ft (18 m) by 26.5 ft (8.1 m). Archeological examination suggests that outer walls were constructed of wood covered in stucco. When completed, the 17,000 ft^{2} (1,600 m^{2}) mansion contained three hallways and 23 to 25 rooms, each with its own fireplace. A featured innovation for that time period was the inclusion of two interior bathrooms supplied with rainwater from a tank in the attic. In 1861, cost of construction was about US$175,000 (equal to $6,270,833 today).

The ground floor basement contained a school room, doctor's office, dairy, commissary, and storage rooms. The second floor had a hallway flanked by the master bedroom, a bathroom, two parlors, a study and a library. In the ell off the second floor was the dining room. Connected to the dining room by a dumbwaiter was the kitchen, located on the ground floor. The third floor contained an additional bath and eight more bedrooms. Eight chimneys extended from the slate-covered roof, and a domed cupola with glass walls was constructed above the attic, over the main block of the mansion.

On April 12, 1861, Smith Daniell died at age 34, just weeks after construction of the mansion was completed.

=== Civil War era ===
Once the American Civil War began in 1861, Confederate forces used the Windsor mansion cupola as an observation platform and signal station. In the spring of 1863, as part of his Vicksburg campaign, Union General Ulysses S. Grant and 17,000 Union troops landed at the port of Bruinsburg and took control of Windsor mansion. Following the Battle of Port Gibson, the mansion was used by Union troops as a hospital and as an observation station. The Daniell family was allowed to live on the third floor of the mansion during the Union occupation.

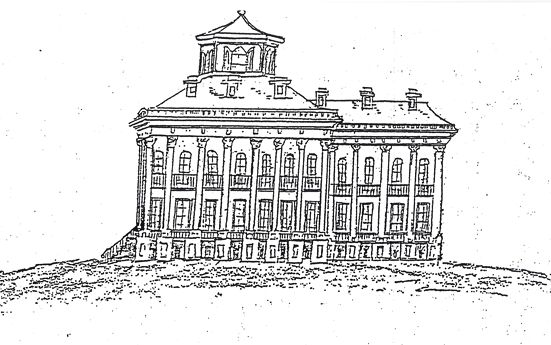
Sketch of Windsor mansion (May 1, 1863)

Windsor mansion survived the war and continued to be used by the Daniell family as a home and for social gatherings in the area. During Reconstruction, the family derived income by leasing part of their vast land holdings.

For more than 100 years, the outward appearance of Windsor mansion was a matter of conjecture. But in the early 1990s, an 1863 sketch of Windsor mansion was discovered in the papers of a former Union officer, Henry Otis Dwight, of the 20th Ohio Infantry. Historians believe that Henry Dwight made the sketch while his unit was encamped on the grounds of the mansion.

=== Fire ===
On February 17, 1890, a fire started on the third floor when a guest dropped ashes from a cigarette or cigar into construction debris left by carpenters who were making repairs. Windsor mansion was destroyed leaving only the columns, balustrades, cast iron stairways, and pieces of bone china.

== Historic site ==
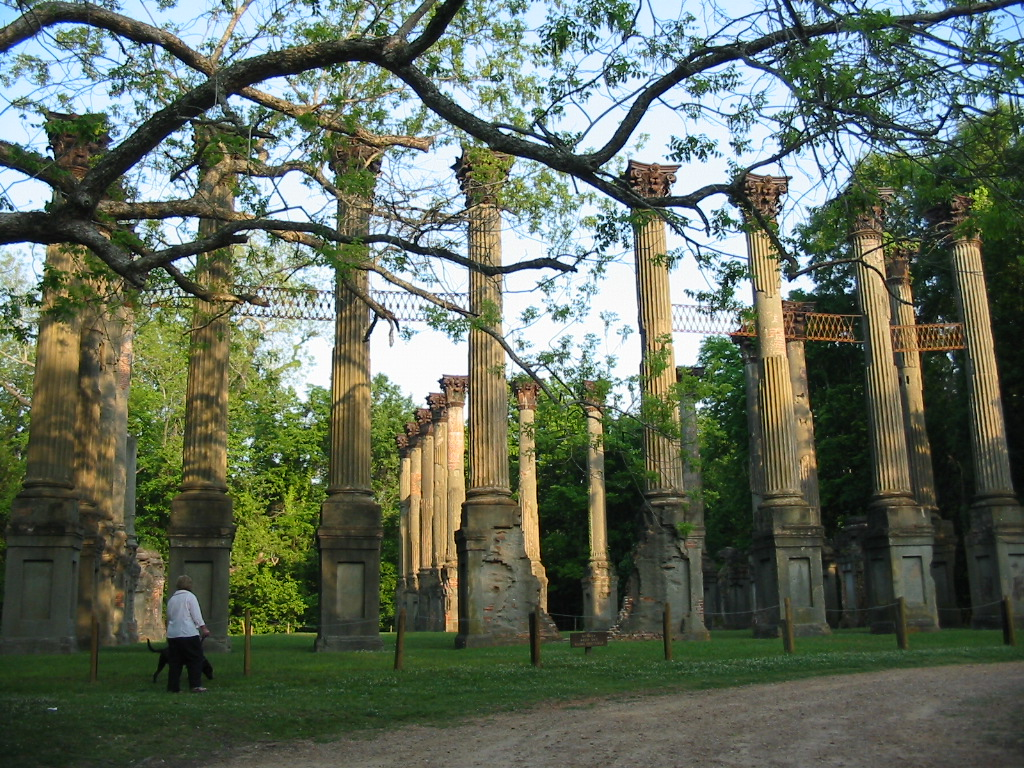
Windsor Ruins in 2007

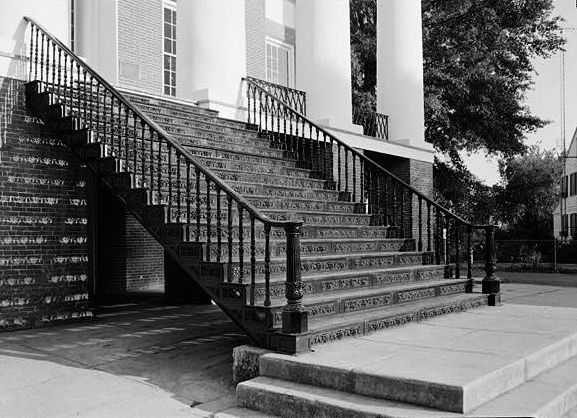
Cast iron stairway from Windsor Ruins, now at the entrance to Oakland Memorial Chapel, Alcorn State University

When Catherine Daniell died in 1903, her daughter, Priscilla Daniell, inherited the mansion property. Priscilla married Joseph Magruder, and the mansion site remained in the Magruder family until 1974, when they donated 2.1 acres (0.85 ha), containing the mansion ruins, to the state of Mississippi. The historic site contains 23 standing columns and 5 partial columns; it is administered by the Mississippi Department of Archives and History.

Through the years, three of the cast iron stairways, that survived the 1890 fire, disappeared from the site. The fourth stairway was moved to Alcorn State University and serves as the entrance to Oakland Memorial Chapel.

North of Windsor Ruins is a cemetery where members of the Daniell and Freeland families have been buried since the early 19th century. The earliest grave is that of Frisby Freeland (1747 – 1819), an American Revolutionary War soldier.

== In popular culture ==
Windsor's ruins have been shown in two motion pictures—Raintree County (1957) and Ghosts of Mississippi (1996).

== See also ==
- The Forks of Cypress
