= Russum, Mississippi =

- Unincorporated community
- Location within Mississippi Location within the United States
- Coordinates: 31°52′39″N 91°00′41″W
- Country: United States
- State: Mississippi
- County: Claiborne
- Elevation: 180 ft (55 m)
- Time zone: UTC-6 (Central (CST))
  - Summer (DST): UTC-5 (CDT)
- ZIP code: 39150
- Area code: 601
- GNIS feature ID: 676972

Russum is an unincorporated community located in Claiborne County, Mississippi, United States. Russum is approximately 4.5 miles (7.2 km) north-northeast of Lorman and approximately 8 miles (13 km) south-southwest of Port Gibson along U.S. Highway 61. Russum is located on the former Yazoo and Mississippi Valley Railroad.

A post office operated under the name Russum from 1884 to 1955.
