= Oakland Memorial Chapel =

Historic church in Mississippi, United States

- U.S. National Register of Historic Places
- U.S. National Historic Landmark
- Mississippi Landmark
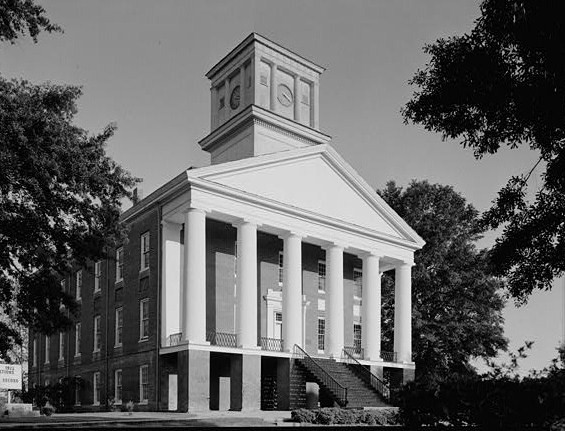
- Main façade of the chapel, 1972

- Location within Mississippi Location within the United States
- Location: Alcorn State University campus, Claiborne County, Mississippi
- Coordinates: 31°52′33″N 91°08′23″W
- Built: 1838
- Architectural style: Greek Revival
- NRHP reference No.: 74001057
- USMS No.: 021-ALC-0003-NHL-ML

Significant dates
- Added to NRHP: December 27, 1974
- Designated NHL: May 11, 1976
- Designated USMS: September 26, 1985

Oakland Memorial Chapel is a historic church and academic building on the campus of Alcorn State University in rural southwestern Claiborne County, Mississippi. Built in 1838 as part of Oakland College, it is one of the oldest surviving buildings at Alcorn State, which took over that defunct school's campus after the American Civil War. Alcorn State was the first land grant university established specifically for the education of African Americans. The chapel was designated a National Historic Landmark in 1976, and a Mississippi Landmark in 1985.

== Description and history ==
The Oakland Memorial Chapel occupies a prominent position on the campus of Alcorn State University, on the southwest side of ASU Drive, one of the rural campus' circulation roads. It is a three-story brick building with a gabled roof. Its ground floor functions as a raised basement, with a colonnade of brick piers supporting a six-column Greek temple portico. The columns are of the Tuscan order, and support an entablature and full gabled pediment. A two-stage square wood-frame tower rises above the roof ridge, with an elaborate second stage featuring fluted Doric columns, and an entablature with trighlyphs, metopes, and mutules. It is crowned by a low balustrade.

Oakland College was founded in 1828 by Reverend Jeremiah Chamberlain as part of a Presbyterian mission to educate the white children of the region. In 1851 Chamberlain, an abolitionist, was assassinated by a supporter of slavery, and the school was closed during the American Civil War. It failed to recover after the war, and closed again soon after reopening. Its assets were sold to the state in 1871. That same year the state established Alcorn State, as the first land grant university specifically for the education of African Americans. It is also believed to be the first state-supported school in the nation to graduate a black woman.

At the time the state acquired the campus, three buildings were standing from the Oakland College period. Of these, the chapel is the best preserved and architecturally the most sophisticated.

The chapel also served as the home gymnasium for the Alcorn State Braves basketball team.

== See also ==
- List of National Historic Landmarks in Mississippi
- National Register of Historic Places listings in Claiborne County, Mississippi
