= Alcorn, Mississippi =

- Unincorporated community
- Location within Mississippi Location within the United States
- Coordinates: 31°52′41″N 91°08′21″W
- Country: United States
- State: Mississippi
- County: Claiborne
- Elevation: 269 ft (82 m)
- Time zone: UTC-6 (Central (CST))
  - Summer (DST): UTC-5 (CDT)
- Area codes: 601 & 769
- GNIS feature ID: 671128

Alcorn is an unincorporated community in Claiborne County, Mississippi, United States. It is the common name given to sites without a name but are around or close to Alcorn State University. Alcorn State University is officially in Lorman, Mississippi by zip code in Jefferson County, Mississippi. A post office operated under the name Alcorn from 1906 to 1954.

Alcorn is the location of four places listed on the National Register of Historic Places:

- Bethel Presbyterian Church
- Canemount
- Catledge Archeological Site
- Oakland Chapel (on the Alcorn State University campus)

== Notable people ==
- Ronnie McNutt American US Army Reserve veteran and suicide victim
