= 20th Ohio Infantry Regiment =

- Active: April 1861 to August 23, 1861 (3 months); August 19, 1861, to July 18, 1865 (3 years)
- Country: United States
- Allegiance: Union
- Branch: Union Army
- Type: Infantry
- Engagements: Battle of Fort Donelson; Battle of Shiloh; Siege of Corinth; Battle of Port Gibson; Battle of Raymond; Battle of Jackson; Battle of Champion Hill; Siege of Vicksburg, May 19 & May 22 assaults; Meridian Campaign; Atlanta campaign; Battle of Kennesaw Mountain; Battle of Atlanta; Siege of Atlanta; Battle of Jonesboro; Battle of Lovejoy's Station; Sherman's March to the Sea; Battle of Nashville (detachment); Carolinas campaign; Battle of Bentonville

The 20th Ohio Infantry Regiment was an infantry regiment in the Union Army during the American Civil War.

== Service ==
=== Three-months regiment ===
The 20th Ohio Infantry Regiment was organized at Columbus, Ohio April through May 1861 in response to President Lincoln's call for 75,000 volunteers and mustered into service on May 23, 1861, under the command of Colonel Charles Whittlesey. The regiment was ordered to western Virginia and attached to Kelley's Command. It participated in action at Richter June 23 and the pursuit of Garnett July 15–16. The regiment then performed duty along Baltimore & Ohio Railroad until August and mustered out on August 23, 1861.

=== Three-years regiment ===
The 20th Ohio Infantry was reorganized at Columbus August 19 through September 21, 1861, and mustered in for three years service on October 21, 1861, under the command of Colonel Charles Whittlesey.

The regiment was attached to 3rd Brigade, 3rd Division, Army of the Tennessee, February to May 1862. 2nd Brigade, 3rd Division, Army of the Tennessee, to July 1862. Unattached, District of Jackson, Tennessee, to November 1862. 2nd Brigade, 3rd Division, Right Wing, XIII Corps, Department of the Tennessee, to December 1862. 2nd Brigade, 3rd Division, XVII Corps, Army of the Tennessee and Army of Georgia, to July 1865.

The 20th Ohio Infantry mustered out of service at Louisville, Kentucky, on July 18, 1865.

=== Detailed service ===
The detailed service of the three-year 20th OVI is as follows:

==== 1861 ====
Moved to Camp King near Covington, Ky., and mustered in October 21. Duty at Covington and Newport, Ky., until February 11, 1862.

==== 1862 ====
Investment and capture of Fort Donelson, Tenn., February 14–16, 1862. Expedition toward Purdy and operations about Crump's Landing, Tenn., March 9–14. Battle of Shiloh, Tenn., April 6–7. Advance on and siege of Corinth, Miss., April 29 – May 30. Guard duty at Pittsburg Landing until June, and at Bolivar, Tenn., until September. Action at Bolivar August 30. Duty in the District of Jackson until November. Grant's Central Mississippi Campaign November 2, 1862, to January 10, 1863. Action at Holly Springs, Miss., December 21, 1862.

==== 1863 ====
Lafayette, Tenn., January 14, 1863. Moved to Memphis, Tenn., January 26, thence to Lake Providence, La., February 22, and duty there until April. Movement on Bruinsburg and turning Grand Gulf April 25–30. Battle of Port Gibson, Miss., May 1. Forty Hills and Hankinson's Ferry May 3–4. Battle of Raymond May 12. Jackson May 14. Champion Hill May 16. Siege of Vicksburg May 18 to July 4. Assaults on Vicksburg May 19–22. Surrender of Vicksburg July 4. Duty at Vicksburg until February 1864. Stevenson's Expedition to Monroe, La., August 20 – September 2, 1863. Expedition to Canton October 14–20. Bogue Chitto Creek October 17.

==== 1864 ====
Regiment reenlisted January 1, 1864. Meridian Campaign February 3 – March 2. Canton February 26. Veterans on furlough March and April. Moved to Clifton, Tenn., then marched to Ackworth, Ga., April 29 – June 9. Atlanta Campaign June 9 to September 8. Operations about Marietta and against Kennesaw Mountain June 10 – July 2. Assault on Kennesaw June 27, Nickajack Creek July 2–5. Howell's Ferry July 5. Chattahoochie River July 6–17. Leggett's or Bald Hill July 20–21. Battle of Atlanta July 22. Siege of Atlanta July 22 – August 25. Flank movement on Jonesboro August 25–30. Sandtown August 28. Battle of Jonesboro August 31 – September 2. Lovejoy's Station September 2–6. Operations against Hood in northern Georgia and northern Alabama September 29 – November 3. March to the sea November 15 – December 10. Siege of Savannah December 10–21.

==== 1865 ====
Campaign of the Carolinas January to April 1865. Pocotaligo, S.C., January 14. Barker's Mills, Whippy Swamp, February 2. Salkehatchie Swamp February 3–5. South Edisto River February 9. North Edisto River February 11–13. Columbia February 16–17. Battle of Bentonville, N.C., March 20–21. Occupation of Goldsboro March 24. Advance on Raleigh April 10–14. Occupation of Raleigh April 14. Bennett's House April 26. Surrender of Johnston and his army. March to Washington, D.C., via Richmond, Va., April 29 – May 20. Grand Review of the Armies May 24. Moved to Louisville, Ky., June.

== Casualties ==
The regiment lost a total of 360 men during service; 2 officers and 87 enlisted men killed or mortally wounded, 4 officers and 267 enlisted men died of disease.

== Commanders ==
- Colonel Charles Whittlesey
- Colonel Manning Ferguson Force
- Captain Francis M. Shaklee – commanded at Vicksburg after Col Force was promoted to brigade command

== Notable members ==
- Private Henry Casey, Company C – Medal of Honor recipient for action at Vicksburg, May 22, 1863
- Brigadier General Manning F. Force – Medal of Honor recipient for action at the battle of Atlanta, July 22, 1864
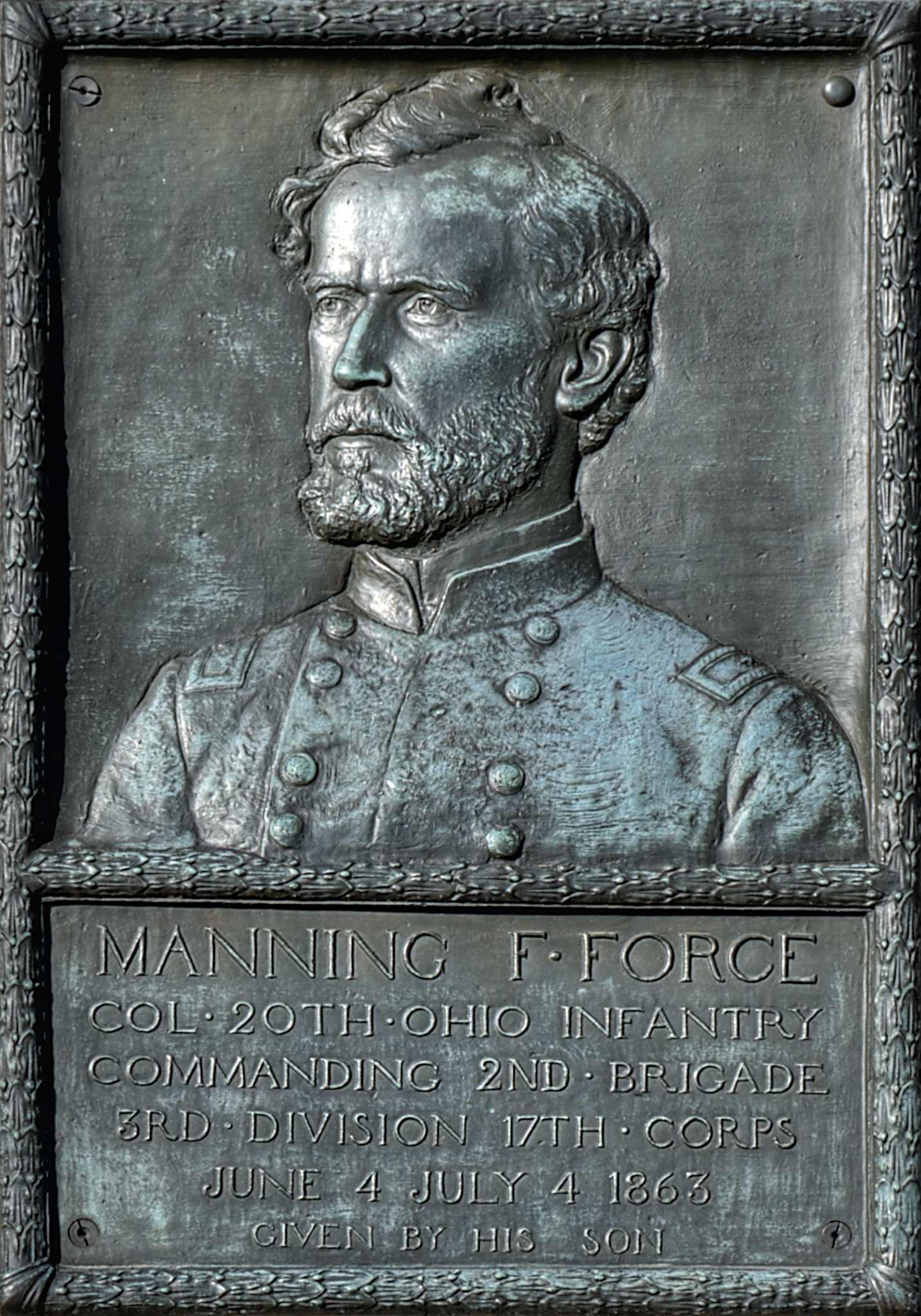
Bronze relief portrait of Manning F. Force at Vicksburg National Military Park

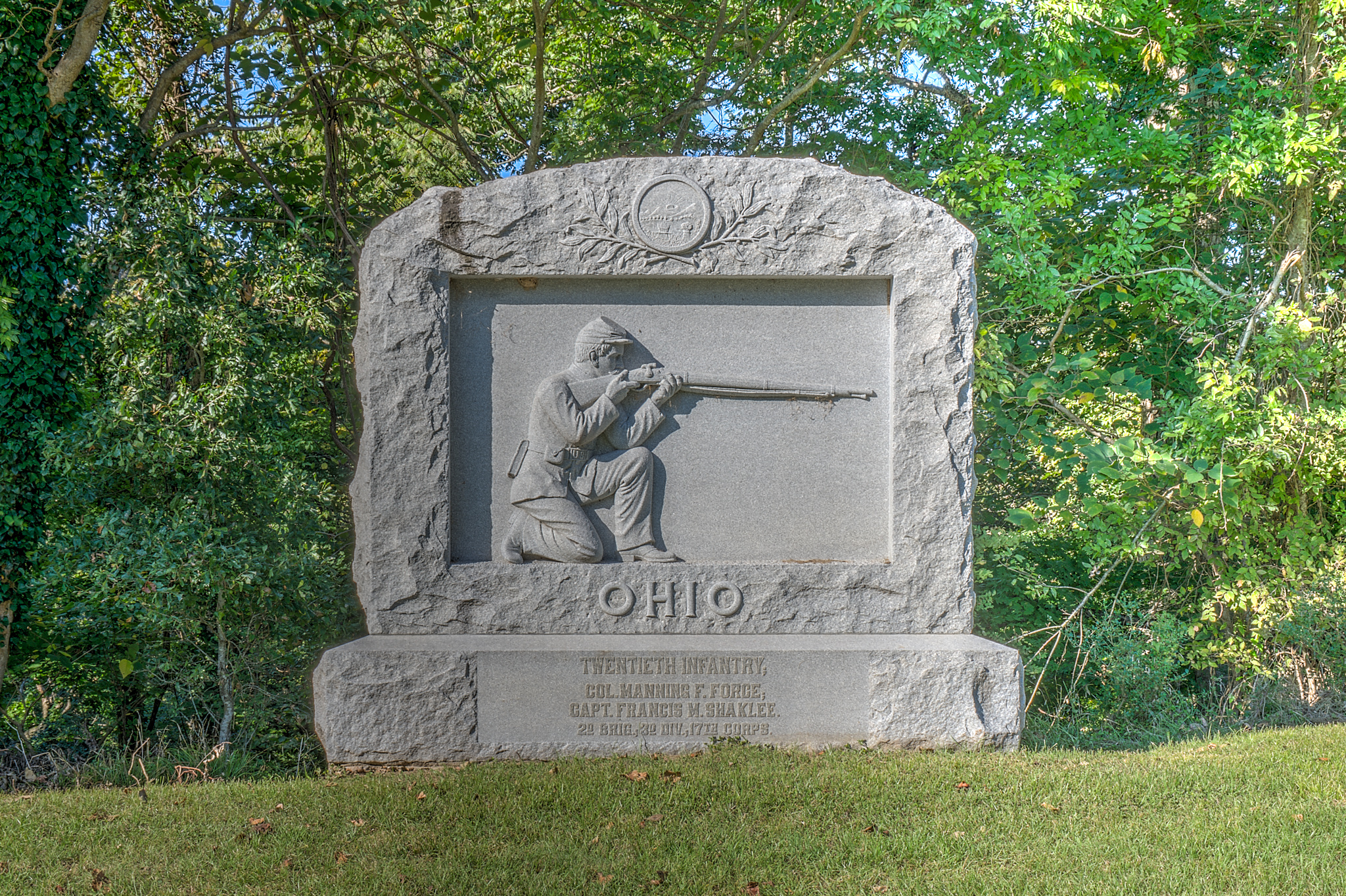
20th Ohio Memorial at Vicksburg National Military Park

== See also ==
- List of Ohio Civil War units
- Ohio in the Civil War
