= Claiborne County, Mississippi =

County in Mississippi, United States

- County
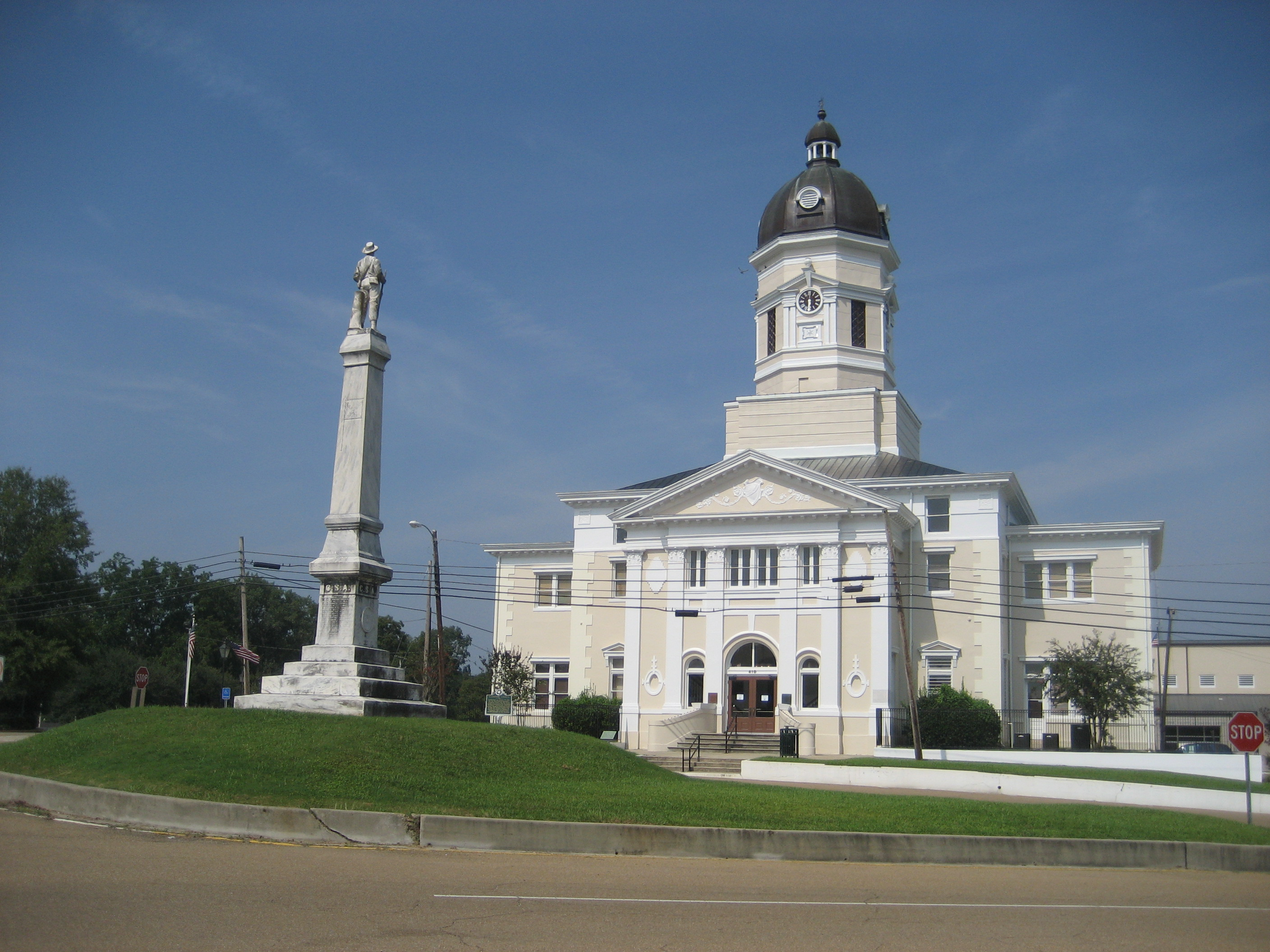
- Claiborne County Courthouse and Confederate Monument in Port Gibson

- Location within the U.S. state of Mississippi
- Coordinates: 31°58′N 90°55′W
- Country: United States
- State: Mississippi
- Founded: 1802
- Named for: William C. C. Claiborne
- Seat: Port Gibson
- Largest city: Port Gibson

Area
  - Total: 501 sq mi (1,300 km^{2})
  - Land: 487 sq mi (1,260 km^{2})
  - Water: 14 sq mi (36 km^{2}) 2.8%

Population (2020)
  - Total: 9,135
  - Estimate (2025): 8,058 ▼
  - Density: 18.8/sq mi (7.24/km^{2})
- Time zone: UTC−6 (Central)
  - Summer (DST): UTC−5 (CDT)
- Congressional district: 2nd
- Website: ccmsgov.us

Claiborne County is a county located in the U.S. state of Mississippi. As of the 2020 census, the population was 9,135. Its county seat is Port Gibson. The county is named after William Claiborne, the second governor of the Mississippi Territory.

Claiborne County is included in the Vicksburg metropolitan area as well as the Jackson, MS Metropolitan Statistical Area. It is bordered by the Mississippi River on the west and the Big Black River on the north.

As of the 2020 Census, this small county has the highest percentage of black or African American residents of any U.S. county, at 88.6% of the population. It also had the lowest median household income of any U.S. county in 2023, at $28,579.

Located just south of the area known as the Mississippi Delta, this area also was a center of cotton plantations and related agriculture along the river, aided by slavery. After emancipation, many generations of blacks have stayed here because of family ties and having made the land their own.

Claiborne County was the center of a little-known but profound demonstration and struggle during the civil rights movement.

== History ==
The county had been settled by French, Spanish, and English colonists, and American pioneers as part of the Natchez District; organized in 1802, it was the fourth county in the Mississippi Territory. European-American settlers did not develop the area for cotton plantations until after Indian Removal in the 1830s, at which time they brought in numerous slaves through the domestic slave trade. In total, this transported one million slaves from the Upper South to the Deep South, disrupting numerous families. Using the slaves, planters developed long plantations that had narrow fronts on the rivers: the Mississippi to the west and the Big Black River to the north, which were the transportation byways. As in other parts of the Delta, the bottomlands areas further from the river remained largely frontier and undeveloped until after the American Civil War. Well before the Civil War, the county had a majority-black population.

Grand Gulf, a port on the Mississippi River, shipped thousands of bales of cotton annually before the Civil War. It received cotton shipped by railroad from Port Gibson and three surrounding counties. The trading town became cut off from the river by its changing course and shifting to the west. Grand Gulf had 1,000 to 1500 residents about 1858; by the end of the century, it had 150 and became a ghost town. Businesses in the county seat of Port Gibson, which served the area, included a cotton gin and a cottonseed oil mill (which continued into the 20th century.) It has also been a retail center of trade.

After the Reconstruction era, Democrats regained power in the state legislature by the mid-1870s; These groups acted as "the military arm of the Democratic Party."

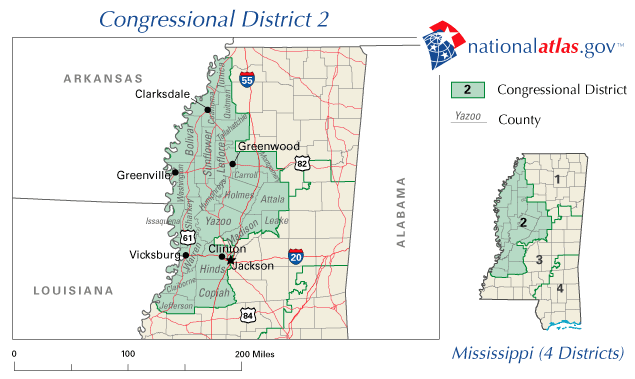
The district from 2003 to 2013

In the late nineteenth century, these Redeemers redefined districts to "reduce Republican voting strength," creating a "'shoestring' Congressional district running the length of the Mississippi River," where most of the black population was concentrated. Five other districts all had white majorities. While party alignments changed in the 20th century, such gerrymandering has persisted to support white political strength. Claiborne County is within the black-majority 2nd congressional district, as may be seen on the map to the right. The state has three other congressional districts, all white majority.

Democrats passed a new constitution in 1890 that included requirements for poll taxes; these and later literacy tests were used in practice to disfranchise most blacks and many poor whites, preventing them from registering to vote. This second-class status was enforced until after the civil rights movement gained passage of the federal Civil Rights Act of 1964 and Voting Rights Act of 1965.

The county's economy continued to be based on agriculture. After the Civil War and emancipation, the system of sharecropping developed. More than 80 percent of African-American workers were involved in sharecropping from the late 19th century into the 1930s, shaping all aspects of daily life for them. A newspaper account of 1907 reported that a "big colony of whites and blacks are preparing to move the latter part of the year to Indian Territory to begin the battle of life over again. The depopulation of Claiborne county is a serious thing. This discontent should be remedied for we have no one to take the place of those people on the farms. The census of 1910 will show a loss of 4000 people from Claiborne county."

=== 20th century to present ===
Excluded from the political process and suffering lynchings and other violence, many blacks left the county and state in the Great Migration. In 1900 whites numbered 4565 in the county, and blacks 16,222. A local history noted many blacks were leaving the county at that time. As can be seen in the Historical Population table in the "Demographics" section below, from 1900 to 1920, the population of the county declined by 41%, more than 8500 persons from the peak of 20,787. Most of these rural blacks migrated to the industrial North and Midwest cities, such as Chicago, to seek jobs and other opportunities elsewhere. Rural whites also migrated out of the South.

Despite the passage of national civil rights legislation in the mid-1960s, African Americans in Claiborne County continued to struggle against white supremacy in most aspects of their lives. The Mississippi State Sovereignty Commission continued to try to spy on and disrupt black meetings. In reaction to harassment and violence, in 1966 blacks formed a group, Deacons for Defense, which armed to protect the people and was strictly for self-defense. They learned the law and stayed within it. After shadowing police to prevent abuses, its leaders eventually began to work closely with the county sheriff to keep relations peaceful. In later years, five of the Deacons worked in law enforcement and two were the first blacks to run for county sheriff.

In the late 1960s, African Americans struggled to integrate schools, and to register and vote. In 1965 NAACP leader Charles Evers (brother of Medgar, who had been assassinated) became very active in Claiborne County and other areas of southwest Mississippi, including Adams and Jefferson counties. He gained an increase in voter registration as well as increasing membership in the NAACP throughout the region. Evers was influential in a developing a moderate coalition of blacks and white liberals in Mississippi. They wanted to develop alternatives to both the Mississippi Freedom Democratic Party and the all-white Democratic Regulars.

In the June 1966 Democratic primary, blacks in Claiborne and Jefferson counties cast decisive majorities, voting for the MFDP candidate, Marcus Whitley, for Congress and giving him victory in those counties. In the November election, Evers led an African-American vote for the Independent senatorial candidate, Prentiss Walker, who won in those counties but lost to incumbent James O. Eastland, a white Democrat. (Claiborne County and southwest Mississippi were then in the Mississippi's 4th congressional district.) Walker was a conservative who in 1964 was elected as the first Republican Congressman from Mississippi in the 20th century, as part of a major realignment of political parties in the South.

To gain integration of public facilities and more opportunities in local businesses, where no black clerks were hired, African Americans undertook an economic boycott of merchants in the county seat of Port Gibson. (Similar economic boycotts were conducted in this period in Jackson and Greenville.) Evers led the boycott, enforced its maintenance, and later negotiated with merchants and their representatives on how to end it. While criticized for some of his methods, Evers gained support from the national NAACP for his apparent effectiveness, from the segregationist Mississippi State Sovereignty Commission for negotiating on certain elements, and from local African Americans and white liberals. The boycott was upheld as a legal form of political protest by the United States Supreme Court.

The economic boycott was concluded in late January 1967, when merchants agreed to hire blacks as clerks. Nearly two dozen people were hired, and merchants promised more courteous treatment and ease of shopping. In addition, by this time 50 students were attending formerly whites-only public schools. In November 1966 Floyd Collins ran for the school board; he was the county's first black candidate for electoral office since Reconstruction. He was defeated, but a majority of blacks carried the county against Democratic Regular candidates for the Senate and Congress, incumbent senator James Eastland and John Bell Williams.

Since 2003, when Mississippi had to redistrict because it lost a seat in Congress, Claiborne County has been included in the black-majority 2nd congressional district. Its voters strongly support Democratic candidates. The three other districts are white majority and vote for Republicans.

== Law enforcement ==
The Claiborne County Sheriff's Department was formed in 1818, when A. Barnes became Claiborne County's first sheriff. Despite having a majority black population, Claiborne has only had three black sheriffs. In 1874, during the period known as Reconstruction, Thomas Bland became the county's first black sheriff. He served for less than a year. It would be over a hundred years before Claiborne would have another black sheriff when Frank Davis took office in 1979. The current Sheriff is Edward "Moose" Goods, who was first elected in 2019 and was re-elected in 2024 with over 60% of votes.

== Politics ==
Claiborne County is overwhelmingly Democratic, and has often stood as the most Democratic county in the entire state of Mississippi.

United States presidential election results for Claiborne County, Mississippi
Year	Republican		Democratic		Third party(ies)	
Year	No.	%	No.	%	No.	%
1912	3	0.74%	399	98.76%	2	0.50%
1916	5	1.13%	435	98.64%	1	0.23%
1920	14	3.37%	401	96.39%	1	0.24%
1924	14	2.26%	605	97.74%	0	0.00%
1928	43	5.73%	708	94.27%	0	0.00%
1932	16	2.19%	713	97.67%	1	0.14%
1936	31	3.85%	774	96.03%	1	0.12%
1940	32	4.11%	737	94.61%	10	1.28%
1944	45	5.96%	710	94.04%	0	0.00%
1948	14	1.81%	19	2.45%	742	95.74%
1952	560	53.03%	496	46.97%	0	0.00%
1956	191	23.24%	339	41.24%	292	35.52%
1960	180	17.37%	205	19.79%	651	62.84%
1964	1,226	93.59%	84	6.41%	0	0.00%
1968	230	6.57%	2,129	60.79%	1,143	32.64%
1972	1,521	41.76%	2,076	57.00%	45	1.24%
1976	1,078	27.99%	2,657	68.98%	117	3.04%
1980	1,129	26.70%	3,032	71.71%	67	1.58%
1984	1,294	28.86%	3,179	70.90%	11	0.25%
1988	1,233	28.35%	3,083	70.89%	33	0.76%
1992	935	21.19%	3,302	74.84%	175	3.97%
1996	784	16.87%	3,739	80.46%	124	2.67%
2000	883	19.13%	3,670	79.52%	62	1.34%
2004	950	17.74%	4,362	81.46%	43	0.80%
2008	748	13.72%	4,682	85.86%	23	0.42%
2012	625	11.40%	4,838	88.22%	21	0.38%
2016	540	12.64%	3,708	86.80%	24	0.56%
2020	603	13.55%	3,772	84.78%	74	1.66%
2024	558	15.76%	2,950	83.31%	33	0.93%

== Geography ==
According to the U.S. Census Bureau, the county has a total area of 501 square miles (1,300 km^{2}), of which 487 square miles (1,260 km^{2}) is land and 14 square miles (36 km^{2}) (2.8%) is water.

=== Major highways ===
- U.S. Route 61
- Mississippi Highway 18
- Mississippi Highway 547
- Mississippi Highway 548
- Natchez Trace Parkway

=== Adjacent counties and parishes ===
- Warren County (north)
- Hinds County (northeast)
- Copiah County (east)
- Jefferson County (south)
- Tensas Parish, Louisiana (west)

=== National protected area ===
- Natchez Trace Parkway (part)

== Demographics ==
Historical population
Census	Pop.	Note	%±
1810	3,102		—
1820	5,963		92.2%
1830	9,787		64.1%
1840	13,078		33.6%
1850	14,941		14.2%
1860	15,679		4.9%
1870	13,386		−14.6%
1880	16,768		25.3%
1890	14,516		−13.4%
1900	20,787		43.2%
1910	17,403		−16.3%
1920	13,019		−25.2%
1930	12,152		−6.7%
1940	12,810		5.4%
1950	11,944		−6.8%
1960	10,845		−9.2%
1970	10,086		−7.0%
1980	12,279		21.7%
1990	11,370		−7.4%
2000	11,831		4.1%
2010	9,604		−18.8%
2020	9,135		−4.9%
2025 (est.)	8,058	▼	−11.8%
U.S. Decennial Census; 1790-1960 1900-1990; 1990-2000 2010-2013

Population declined from 1940 to 1979 as more African Americans left in the Great Migration. After gains from 1970 to 1980, population has declined since 1980 by nearly 25%. Because of limited economic opportunities in the rural county, residents have left.

=== 2020 census ===
Claiborne County, Mississippi – Racial and ethnic composition Note: the US Census treats Hispanic/Latino as an ethnic category. This table excludes Latinos from the racial categories and assigns them to a separate category. Hispanics/Latinos may be of any race.
Race / Ethnicity (NH = Non-Hispanic)	Pop 1980	Pop 1990	Pop 2000	Pop 2010	Pop 2020	% 1980	% 1990	% 2000	% 2010	% 2020
White alone (NH)	3,069	1,976	1,783	1,353	974	24.99%	17.38%	15.07%	14.09%	10.66%
Black or African American alone (NH)	9,081	9,302	9,892	8,072	7,959	73.96%	81.81%	83.61%	84.05%	87.13%
Native American or Alaska Native alone (NH)	1	20	6	9	8	0.01%	0.18%	0.05%	0.09%	0.09%
Asian alone (NH)	29	16	16	40	0	0.24%	0.14%	0.14%	0.42%	0.00%
Native Hawaiian or Pacific Islander alone (NH)	x	x	0	0	0	x	x	0.00%	0.00%	0.00%
Other race alone (NH)	18	0	2	6	8	0.15%	0.00%	0.02%	0.06%	0.09%
Mixed race or Multiracial (NH)	x	x	38	50	114	x	x	0.32%	0.52%	1.25%
Hispanic or Latino (any race)	81	56	94	74	72	0.66%	0.49%	0.79%	0.77%	0.79%
Total	12,279	11,370	11,831	9,604	9,135	100.00%	100.00%	100.00%	100.00%	100.00%

=== 2020 census ===
As of the 2020 census, the county had a population of 9,135. The median age was 34.2 years. 20.9% of residents were under the age of 18 and 15.6% of residents were 65 years of age or older. For every 100 females there were 84.7 males, and for every 100 females age 18 and over there were 80.0 males age 18 and over.

The racial makeup of the county was 10.7% White, 87.5% Black or African American, 0.1% American Indian and Alaska Native, <0.1% Asian, <0.1% Native Hawaiian and Pacific Islander, 0.2% from some other race, and 1.6% from two or more races. Hispanic or Latino residents of any race comprised 0.8% of the population.

<0.1% of residents lived in urban areas, while 100.0% lived in rural areas.

There were 3,289 households in the county, of which 30.6% had children under the age of 18 living in them. Of all households, 27.4% were married-couple households, 23.6% were households with a male householder and no spouse or partner present, and 43.0% were households with a female householder and no spouse or partner present. About 33.5% of all households were made up of individuals and 12.5% had someone living alone who was 65 years of age or older.

There were 3,906 housing units, of which 15.8% were vacant. Among occupied housing units, 73.1% were owner-occupied and 26.9% were renter-occupied. The homeowner vacancy rate was 2.0% and the rental vacancy rate was 13.8%.

=== 2010 census ===
As of the 2010 United States census, there were 9,604 people living in the county. 84.4% were Black or African American, 14.2% White, 0.4% Asian, 0.1% Native American, 0.3% of some other race and 0.6% of two or more races. 0.8% were Hispanic or Latino (of any race).

=== 2000 census ===
As of the census of 2000, there were 11,831 people, 3,685 households, and 2,531 families living in the county. The population density was 24 people per square mile (9/km^{2}). There were 4,252 housing units at an average density of 9 per square mile (3/km^{2}). The racial makeup of the county was 84.11% Black or African American, 15.18% White, 0.05% Native American, 0.14% Asian, 0.10% from other races, and 0.41% from two or more races. 0.79% of the population were Hispanic or Latino of any race.

There were 3,685 households, out of which 34.80% had children under the age of 18 living with them, 36.50% were married couples living together, 26.90% had a female householder with no husband present, and 31.30% were non-families. 28.00% of all households were made up of individuals, and 10.90% had someone living alone who was 65 years of age or older. The average household size was 2.72 and the average family size was 3.35.

In the county, the population was spread out, with 26.30% under the age of 18, 23.10% from 18 to 24, 22.30% from 25 to 44, 17.90% from 45 to 64, and 10.50% who were 65 years of age or older. The median age was 26 years. For every 100 females there were 85.70 males. For every 100 females age 18 and over, there were 81.40 males.

The median income for a household in the county was $22,615, and the median income for a family was $29,867. Males had a median income of $28,777 versus $20,140 for females. The per capita income for the county was $11,244. About 27.90% of families and 32.40% of the population were below the poverty line, including 40.80% of those under age 18 and 28.00% of those age 65 or over.

=== Obesity ===
In 2022, Claiborne County had an obesity rate of 71.2%, making it the most overweight county in Mississippi.

== Communities ==
=== City ===
- Port Gibson (county seat and only municipality)

=== Census-designated place ===
- Alcorn State University
- Hermanville
- Pattison

=== Unincorporated communities ===
- Alcorn
- Carlisle
- Peyton
- Russum

=== Ghost towns ===
- Bruinsburg
- Grand Gulf
- Rocky Springs

== Sites of interest ==
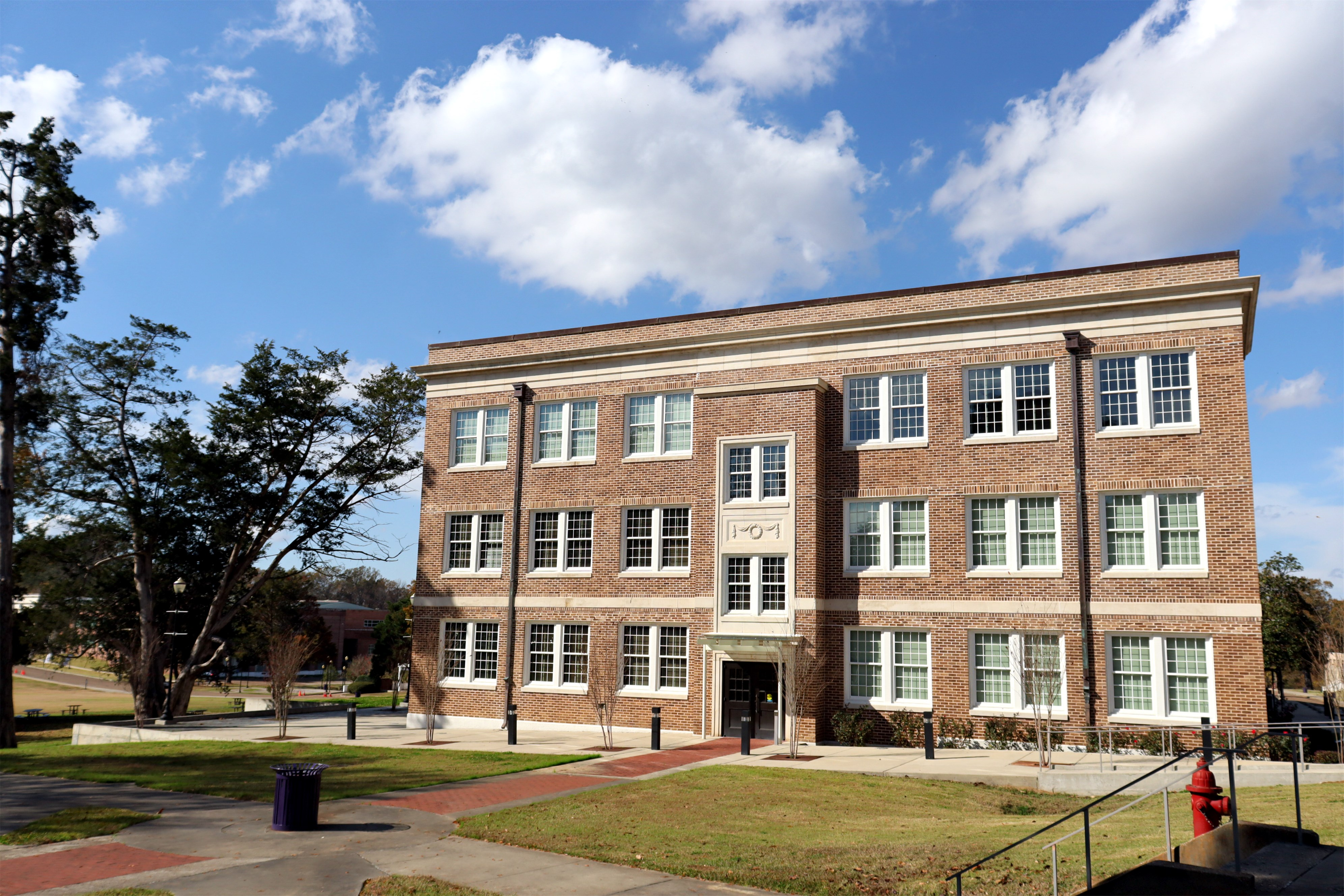
Alcorn State University

- Alcorn State University
- Claiborne County Courthouse
- Grand Gulf Nuclear Generating Station
- Grand Gulf Military State Park (Mississippi)
- Windsor Ruins

== Education ==
All of the county is zoned to the Claiborne County School District.

The county is in the district of Hinds Community College.

== Notable people ==
- Abijah Hunt, New Jersey native and merchant who became a major planter in the area
- David Hunt, nephew of Abijah Hunt who inherited his plantations and businesses, and acquired even more properties, becoming one of 12 planter millionaires in the Natchez District before the American Civil War
- James Monroe Trotter, the first African-American promoted to lieutenant in the US Army during the American Civil War, and first to be hired by the U.S. Postal Service; he was appointed in 1886 as federal Recorder of Deeds in Washington, D.C.
- Joseph Edison Walker, physician and entrepreneur, was born and grew up in Tillman, and founded the Universal Life Insurance Company, one of the largest black-owned insurance companies in the nation.
- Irwin Russell, poet
- Henry Hughes, sociologist
- Thomas C. Healy, painter
- Joshua C. Clark, politician
- Henry T. Ellett, lawyer and secessionist
- Olivia Hastings, women's education advocate
- May Russell, WCTU organizer

== See also ==
- National Register of Historic Places listings in Claiborne County, Mississippi
