= Weir House =

Weir House may refer to:

in New Zealand

- Weir House (Victoria University of Wellington)

in the United States

- Booth-Weir House, McRae, Arkansas, listed on the National Register of Historic Places (NRHP) in White County
- J. Alden Weir Farm Historic District, Ridgefield, Connecticut, NRHP-listed
- Weir Farm National Historic Site, Wilton, Connecticut, NRHP-listed
- John Weir House, Edwardsville, Illinois, NRHP-listed
- William S. Weir Jr. House, Monmouth, Illinois, NRHP-listed in Warren County
- Weir Engine House, Taunton, Massachusetts, NRHP-listed
- Col. John Weir House, Weir, Mississippi, NRHP-listed in Choctaw County
- Weir Greenhouse, New York, New York, NRHP-listed
- Dr. David P. Weir House, Greensboro, North Carolina, NRHP-listed
- Paige-DeCrow-Weir House, Georgetown, Texas, NRHP-listed in Williamson County
