= National Register of Historic Places listings in Choctaw County, Mississippi =

Location of Choctaw County in Mississippi

This is a list of the National Register of Historic Places listings in Choctaw County, Mississippi.

This is intended to be a complete list of the properties and districts on the National Register of Historic Places in Choctaw County, Mississippi, United States. Latitude and longitude coordinates are provided for many National Register properties and districts; these locations may be seen together in a map.

There are 6 properties and districts listed on the National Register in the county.

This National Park Service list is complete through NPS recent listings posted November 6, 2026.

== Current listings ==
	Name on the Register	Image	Date listed	Location	City or town	Description
1	Choctaw Lake Ranger House		July 25, 2001 (#01000753)	Address restricted	Ackerman	Constructed c. 1936
2	Cochran-Pinnix Hotel		November 12, 2026 (#100013590)	22 East Quinn Street; 33°18′35″N 89°10′20″W	Ackerman	
3	Colonel James Drane House		July 21, 1983 (#83000950)	Natchez Trace Parkway; 33°17′43″N 89°24′02″W	French Camp	Constructed c. 1847
4	Janet's Mound		January 11, 1991 (#90002125)	Address restricted	French Camp	
5	Old Natchez Trace (230-3H)		November 7, 1976 (#76000159)	South of Mathiston at Natchez Trace Parkway milepost 198; 33°28′32″N 89°12′04″W	Mathiston	Segment of the Natchez Trace located at a Natchez Trace Parkway interpretive stop.
6	Col. John Weir House		November 7, 1997 (#97001378)	102 Ann Street; 33°15′28″N 89°17′19″W	Weir	Constructed in 1878

== See also ==
- List of National Historic Landmarks in Mississippi
- National Register of Historic Places listings in Mississippi
