= National Register of Historic Places listings in Madison County, Mississippi =

Location of Madison County in Mississippi

This is a list of the National Register of Historic Places listings in Madison County, Mississippi.

This is intended to be a complete list of the properties and districts on the National Register of Historic Places in Madison County, Mississippi, United States. Latitude and longitude coordinates are provided for many of the National Register properties and districts; these locations may be seen together in a map.

There are 31 properties and districts listed on the National Register in the county.

This National Park Service list is complete through NPS recent listings posted July 10, 2026.

== Current listings ==
	Name on the Register	Image	Date listed	Location	City or town	Description
1	John W. Boddie House	John W. Boddie House	May 13, 1982 (#82003106)	Tougaloo College campus 32°24′15″N 90°09′39″W	Tougaloo	Now known as the Robert O. Wilder Building, it is the only remaining structure from the slave plantation that the historically black college was built upon.
2	Boyd Mounds Site (22MD512)	Boyd Mounds Site (22MD512)	July 14, 1989 (#89000784)	Mile 106.9 on the Natchez Trace Parkway; 32°27′13″N 90°04′05″W	Ridgeland	A six mound site that is situated next to a parking area off the Natchez Trace Parkway and is accessible to visitors.
3	Canton Cemetery		January 14, 2015 (#14001155)	S. Lyon St. 32°36′33″N 90°01′45″W	Canton	
4	Canton Courthouse Square Historic District	Canton Courthouse Square Historic District	August 30, 1982 (#82004895)	Center, Liberty, Peace, and Union Sts.; also W. Peace St. 32°36′46″N 90°02′07″W	Canton	W. Peace St. represents a boundary increase of June 29, 1989
5	Canton High School	Canton High School	November 5, 1998 (#98001334)	3380 N. Liberty St. 32°36′58″N 90°02′03″W	Canton	
6	Chapel of the Cross	Chapel of the Cross	June 13, 1972 (#72000698)	6 miles northwest of the junction of Interstate 55 and Mississippi Highway 463; 32°31′18″N 90°11′24″W	Mannsdale	
7	John Curran House		March 2, 1986 (#86000516)	Main St. 32°27′45″N 90°06′59″W	Madison	
8	Doak's Stand Treaty Site		January 30, 1978 (#78003196)	Along Sulphur Springs Rd., northeast of Canton; 32°42′45″N 89°48′57″W	Canton	
9	Dorroh Street Historic District		March 2, 1986 (#86000514)	103, 105, and 115 Dorroh St. 32°27′27″N 90°06′52″W	Madison	
10	East Canton Historic District		April 13, 1998 (#98000274)	Roughly along E. Academy, E. Center, E. Fulton, Lyons, Madison, E. Peace, and Priestly Sts. 32°36′43″N 90°01′37″W	Canton	
11	Fairview School		February 11, 2009 (#08000199)	1278 N. Old Canton Rd. 32°30′17″N 90°02′23″W	Canton	
12	Farr Mercantile Co.-R.B. Price Mercantile Co.		March 2, 1986 (#86000517)	Main and Railroad; 32°27′43″N 90°06′56″W	Madison	
13	Kirkpatrick Dental Office		July 9, 1991 (#91000878)	229 E. Center St. 32°36′50″N 90°01′51″W	Canton	
14	Long Moss Plantation House		March 1, 1996 (#96000180)	305 Quail Rd. 32°39′29″N 89°58′16″W	Canton	
15	Madison County Jail	Madison County Jail	March 28, 1979 (#79001330)	234 E. Fulton St. 32°36′37″N 90°01′53″W	Canton	
16	Madison-Ridgeland Public School	Madison-Ridgeland Public School	March 2, 1986 (#86000518)	Montgomery St. 32°27′37″N 90°06′52″W	Madison	
17	Mississippi Institute of Aeronautics Aircraft Hangars	Mississippi Institute of Aeronautics Aircraft Hangars	August 24, 2005 (#05000910)	Bruce Campbell Field, 7496 Old Canton Rd. 32°26′40″N 90°06′19″W	Madison	
18	Montgomery House	Montgomery House	September 7, 1984 (#84002260)	Main St. 32°27′42″N 90°07′06″W	Madison	
19	Mt. Zion Baptist Church		April 6, 2000 (#00000333)	514 W. North St. 32°36′54″N 90°02′29″W	Canton	
20	Old Natchez Trace and Choctaw Agency Site		February 2, 1995 (#94001579)	Between Interstate 55 and Livingston Rd., west of Ridgeland; 32°25′36″N 90°10′37″W	Ridgeland	Includes a 3.3-mile segment of the Natchez Trace (partially in the Natchez Trace Parkway right of way) and an archeological investigation site at the location that from 1811 to 1823 housed a government agency to the Choctaw.
21	Old Natchez Trace (170-30)	Old Natchez Trace (170-30)	November 7, 1976 (#76000160)	East of Ridgeland at Natchez Trace Parkway milepost 104.6; 32°25′27″N 90°05′19″W	Ridgeland	Two segments of the Natchez Trace located at a Natchez Trace Parkway interpretive stop.
22	Puckshunubbee-Haley Site		May 9, 1984 (#84002264)	Address restricted	Madison	
23	Sedgewood Plantation	Sedgewood Plantation	November 29, 2000 (#00001400)	2607 Virlilia Rd. 32°37′05″N 90°16′26″W	Canton	
24	Charles F. Smith House	Charles F. Smith House	March 7, 1994 (#94000145)	140 Semmes Ave. 32°36′26″N 90°01′59″W	Canton	
25	Strawberry Fields Site (22Md644)		December 22, 1988 (#88002707)	Address restricted	Canton	
26	Strawberry Patch-McKay House	Strawberry Patch-McKay House	March 2, 1986 (#86000515)	Old Canton Rd. 32°26′53″N 90°06′21″W	Madison	
27	Tilda Bogue		December 9, 1983 (#83003965)	Address restricted	Canton	
28	Tougaloo College	Tougaloo College	August 31, 1998 (#98001109)	Tougaloo; 32°24′13″N 90°09′27″W	Tougaloo	
29	White Perch Paradise Site (22MD641)		February 27, 1987 (#87000226)	Address restricted	Goshen Springs	
30	Yazoo & Mississippi Valley Railroad Depot		October 31, 1995 (#95001195)	Vernon St. between the Illinois Central railroad tracks and Main St. 32°32′36″N 90°18′34″W	Flora	
31	Young House	Young House	November 10, 2008 (#08001046)	3463 N. Liberty St. 32°37′19″N 90°02′03″W	Canton	

== See also ==
- List of National Historic Landmarks in Mississippi
- National Register of Historic Places listings in Mississippi
