= Threet =

Threet may refer to:

- Threet, Alabama, a town in Alabama

== People with the surname ==
- Steven Threet, American football quarterback
