= List of Choctaw agencies =

A Choctaw agency is a place where Indian agents work with the Choctaw people (Chahta) on behalf of the U.S. government. There were at least four Choctaw Agencies in the southwestern United States prior to Jacksonian federal Indian Removal.

- Choctaw Agency (Chickasawhay River)
- Choctaw Agency (Pearl River)
- Old Natchez Trace segments listed on the National Register of Historic Places § Old Natchez Trace and Choctaw Agency Site (Madison County, Mississippi)
- Agency, Mississippi (Oktibbeha County)
- Walker's Station, Oklahoma
- Skullyville, in present-day LeFlore County, Oklahoma, established 1832

== See also ==
- List of Chickasaw agencies
