= Victoria House =

Victoria House may refer to:

- Victoria House, Greenwich, a historic school building originally constructed in 1909 for the Royal Army Medical Corps
- Victoria House, London, a building on Bloomsbury Square, constructed in the 1920s
- Victoria House (Victoria University of Wellington), a residential college in New Zealand, established 1907
- Victoria House (film), a 2009 Bollywood film

== See also ==
- Victorian house, an architectural style
