= Col. James Drane House =

Historic house in Mississippi, United States

- U.S. National Register of Historic Places
- Location within Mississippi Location within the United States
- Location: Natchez Trace Pkwy, French Camp, Mississippi
- Coordinates: 33°17′43″N 89°24′2″W
- Area: 1.4 acres (0.57 ha)
- Built: 1846
- Architectural style: Frontier I-House
- NRHP reference No.: 83000950
- Added to NRHP: July 21, 1983

The Colonel James Drane House is a frontier I-house built from 1846 to 1848. It is located on the historic Natchez Trace, at mile marker 180.7 on the modern Natchez Trace Parkway in French Camp, Mississippi, USA. It was built for James Drane, a state politician.

The house was listed on the National Register of Historic Places on July 21, 1983.

The house is an attraction for modern visitors to the Natchez Trace.

See also Old Natchez Trace segments listed on the National Register of Historic Places.

It has been listed on the National Register of Historic Places
