= Boyd Mounds Site =

Archaeological site (Mississippi)

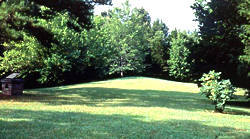

- Location in Mississippi today
- 32°27′11.84″N 90°4′2.86″W
- Cultures: Late Woodland and Early Mississippian period
- Location: Ridgeland, Mississippi, Madison County, Mississippi, USA
- Region: Madison County, Mississippi

Site notes
- Architectural style: burial mounds Number of temples: 6
- Boyd Mounds Site
- U.S. National Register of Historic Places
- Area: 91 acres (37 ha)
- NRHP reference No.: 89000784
- Added to NRHP: July 14, 1989

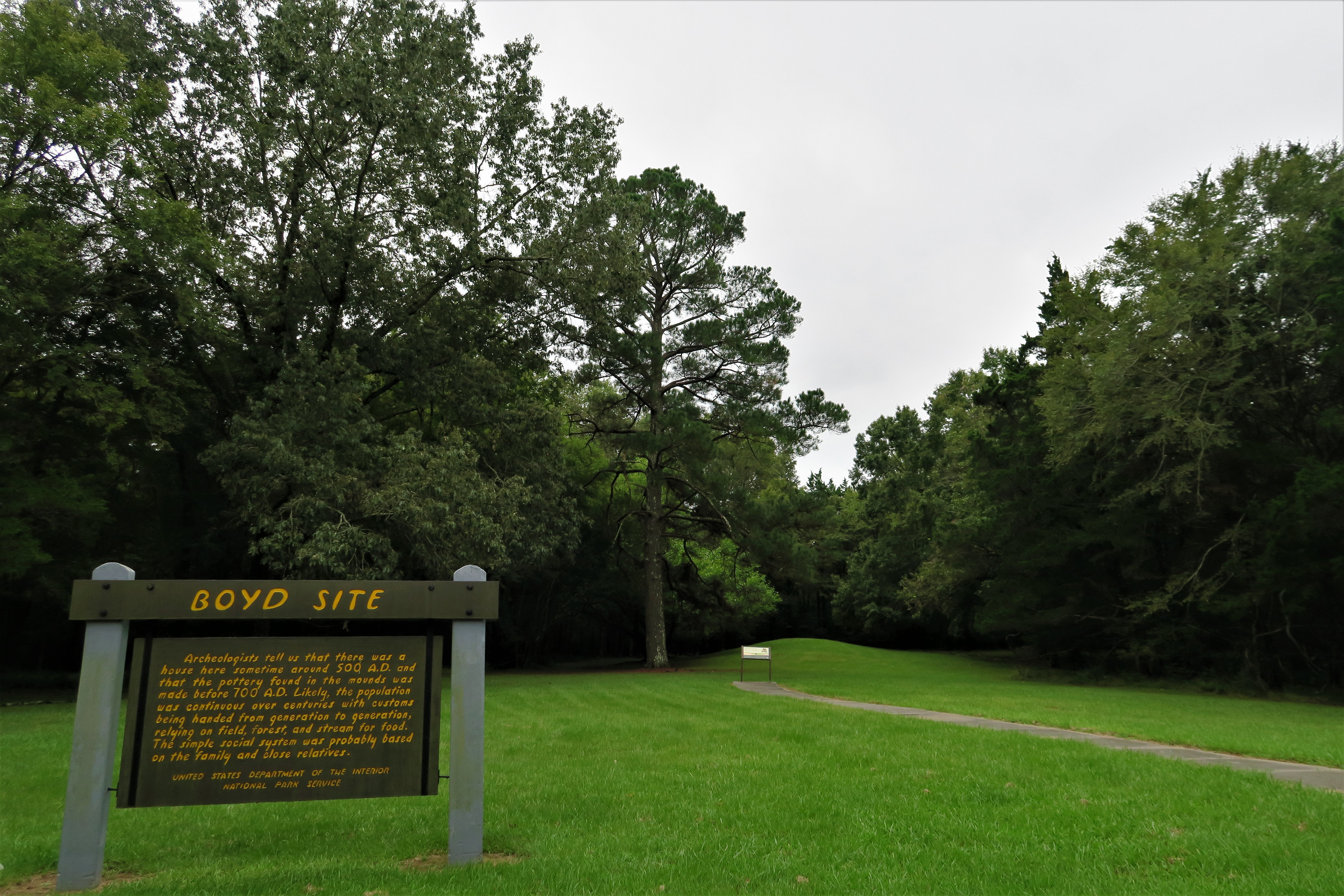
Boyd Mounds

The Boyd Mounds Site (22MD512) is an archaeological site from the Late Woodland and Early Mississippian period located in Madison County, Mississippi near Ridgeland. Many of the mounds were excavated by The National Park Service in 1964. It is located at mile 106.9 on the old Natchez Trace, now the Natchez Trace Parkway. It was added to the NRHP on July 14, 1989 as NRIS number 89000784.

== Description ==
The site consists of six burial mounds dating to the Late Woodland and Early Mississippian period. Of the six mounds at the site, Mound 2 is situated next to a parking area off the Natchez Trace Parkway and is accessible to visitors. Mound 2 is 110 feet (34 m) by 60 feet (18 m) and 4 feet (1.2 m) in height. Excavations done by the National Park Service in the early 1960s showed that the mound was initially two mounds that were constructed side by side but were later joined together when a new layer of earth was added to create a single oblong mound. Excavators also found the remains of forty one individuals, and an array of artifacts such as pottery in the mound.

== See also ==
- List of Mississippian sites
- Old Natchez Trace segments listed on the National Register of Historic Places.
