= List of Chickasaw agencies =

A Chickasaw agency is a place where Indian agents work with the Chickasaw people (Chikashsha) on behalf of the U.S. government. There were at least two Chickasaw Agencies in the southwestern United States prior to Jacksonian federal Indian Removal. The current Chickasaw agency is in Ada, Oklahoma.

- Chickasaw Agency, south of Tokshish and Pontotoc on the Natchez Trace in Mississippi, 1801–1826
- Chickasaw Agency, along the Tennessee River in Alabama, 1826–1839

== See also ==
- List of Choctaw agencies
