= Tokshish, Mississippi =

Landmark in colonial Mississippi

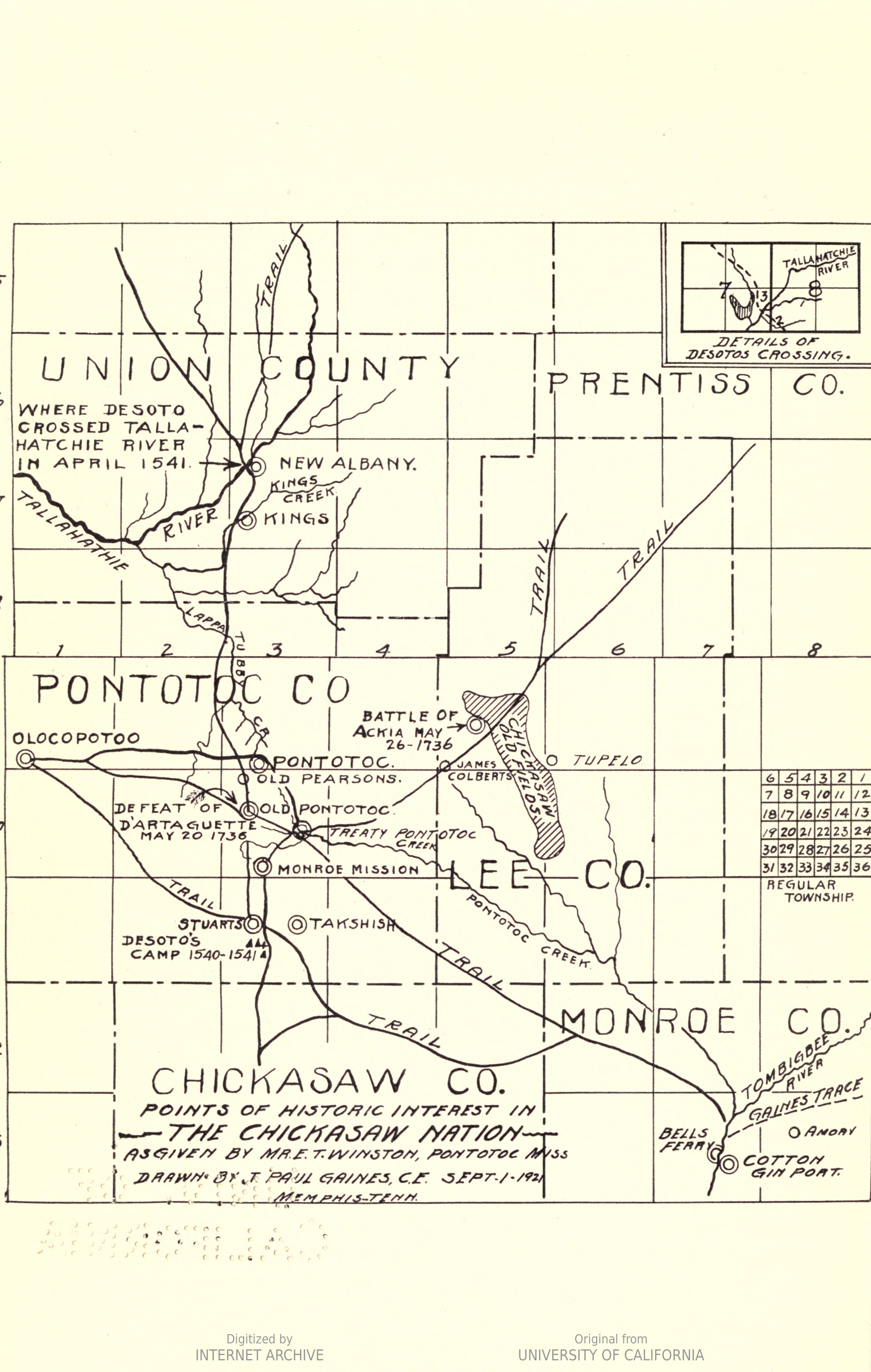
Points of historic interest in the Chickasaw Nation, Mississippi (drawn 1922)

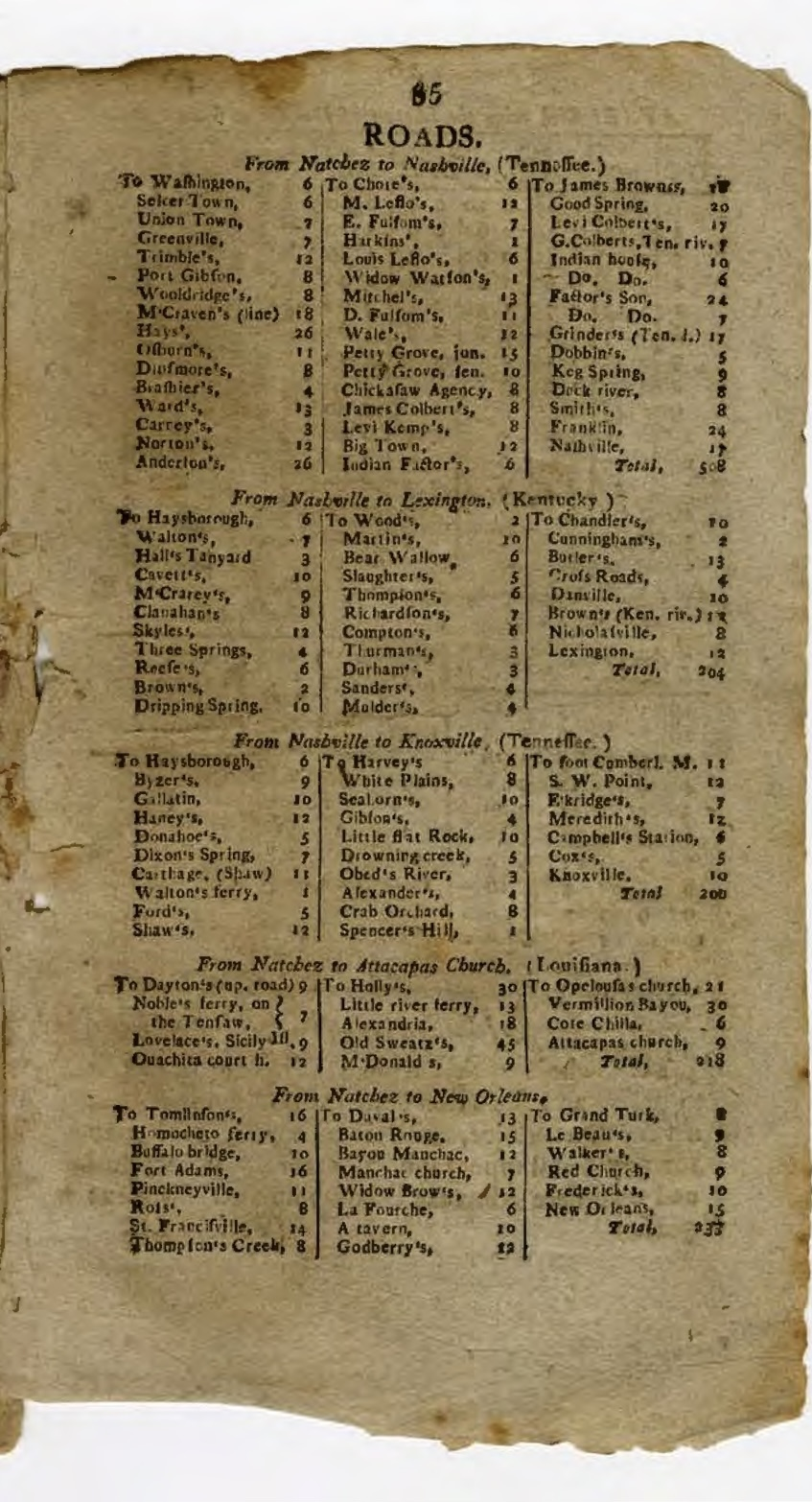
Stops on the Natchez Trace, 1815

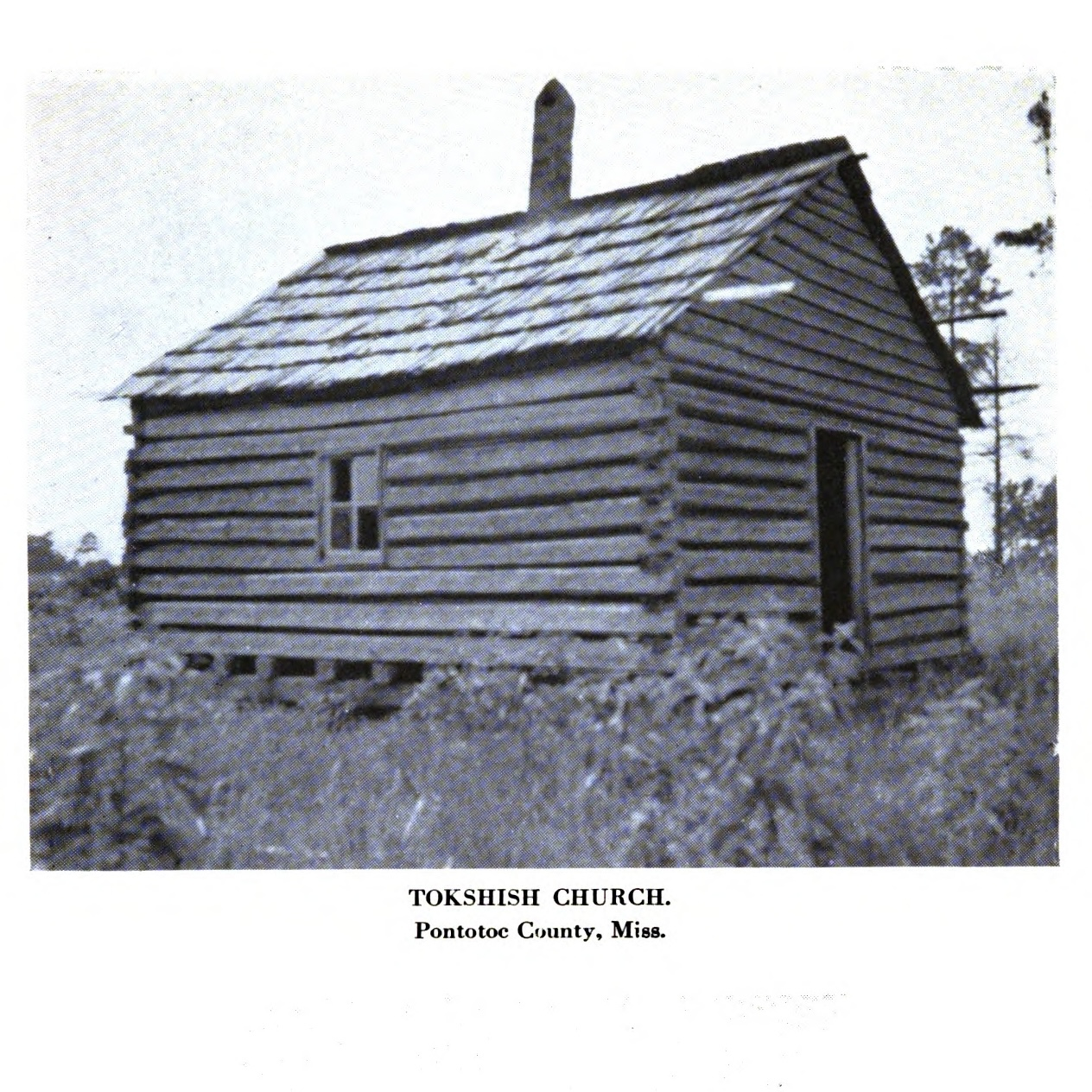
Tokshish Church, 1935

Tokshish, or McIntoshville, is a historic location in Pontotoc County, Mississippi, United States. Originally an 18th century trading post run by John McIntosh for exchange with the Chickasaw people, over time it became a landmark on the Natchez Trace. The placename is derivative of the name McIntosh. Around 1801, McIntoshville, located about 9 mi (14 km) northwest of the Chickasaw agency, became the second official U.S. post office in present-day Mississippi (Natchez being the first). The original McIntosh's son had a tavern that was mentioned in journals of travelers on the road between 1797 and 1803. McIntosh had married the widow of James Colbert; after McIntosh died around 1803 she continued running the tavern.

In April 1803 a traveler reported, "On the trace through the Chickasaw nation in the neighbourhood of M'Intosh's (named after a British agent there before the American revolution) observed a horse grist mill, large felds well fenced and cultivated, abundance of horses, cows, and hogs, corn and provision in great plenty, and here we bought from the Indians the best cured and sweet bacon we found on the road. There are a great many white people in this neighbourhood, among whom the agent acts as magistrate, according to the laws of the United States."

Mississippi judge George Etheridge claimed that William Colbert lived at Tokshish. There was a Chickasaw school at Tokshish before removal. According to historian Dawson Phelps, "The name does not appear on maps published after the late 1830s or after the settlement of the former Chickasaw lands was well under way."

== See also ==
- Treaty of Old Town
- Treaty of Pontotoc Creek
