= Weir House (Victoria University of Wellington) =

Residential college in Wellington, New Zealand

- He Toa Takitini
- Victoria University of Wellington
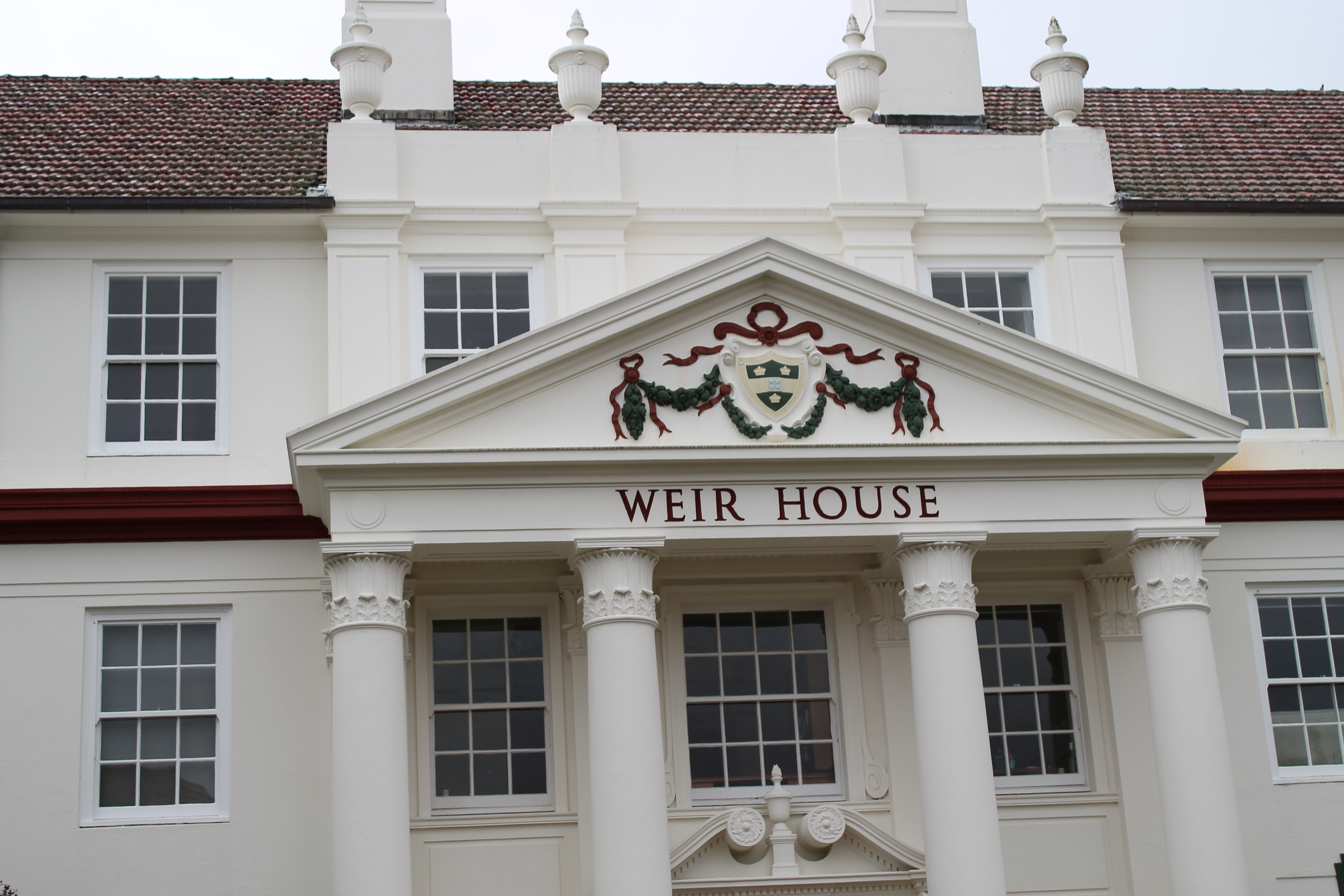
- Main entrance of Weir House

- Location: Gladstone Terrace, Wellington
- Coordinates: 41.283757°S 174.770358°E
- Motto: Ex contubernio robur (Latin)
- Motto in English: Strength through companionship
- Established: 1933
- Head: Leif Hansen
- Deputy Head: Alice Scott
- Administrator: Jess Ogg
- Undergraduates: ~160
- Website: www.victoria.ac.nz/weirhouse/

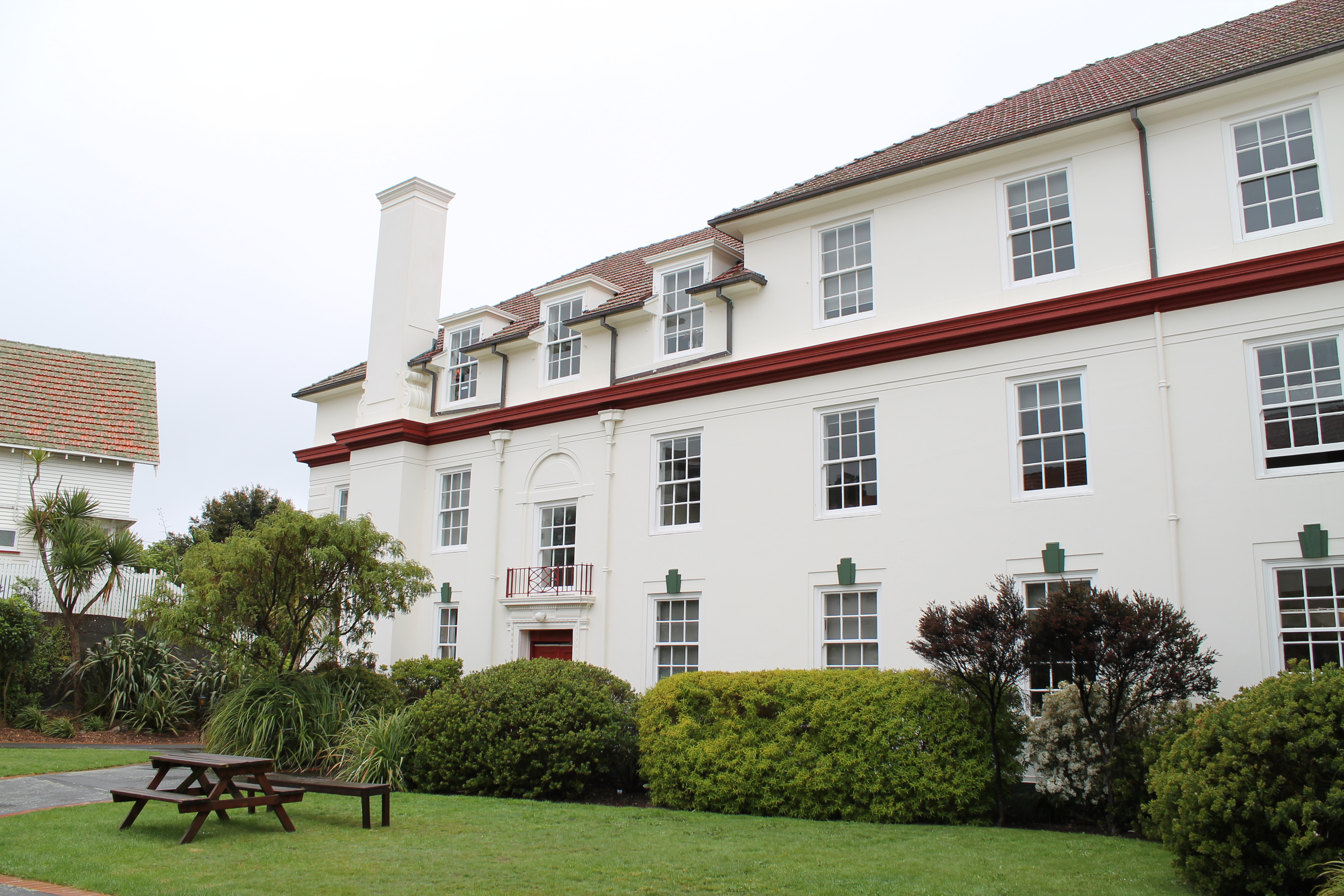
Old wing of Weir House

Weir House is a hall of residence of Victoria University of Wellington, located in the city of Wellington in New Zealand. It is home to over 160 undergraduates, and is the second oldest of the residential colleges, after Victoria House.

== History ==
In 1926, the death of William Weir left the University with an estate of £77,500 to build its first hall of residence for male students. Although work began in 1930, the building had to be redesigned when the Napier earthquake struck in February 1931. On 1 March 1933, the governor-general planted a pohutukawa and officially opened Weir House. Sixty-five students took up residence that year in the original William Weir wing. By 1935, there was a waiting list.

In 1968, the Department of External Affairs funded the James Hutchison Wing as part of the Colombo Plan. This was later renovated and extended in 1994. After litigation due to the will of William Weir stating his money was to be used for a male hall of residence, female students were finally allowed to take up residence at Weir House in 1979 as the hall had built its extension through government funding.

The former Japanese ambassador's residence was acquired and converted to Andrea Brander House in 1987, accommodating students who wish to live in an alcohol free area. In 2006, a new alcohol-free block called Te Whānau was built and has a glass lounge (named Piringa), which is used as a common area.

In 2015 and 2016, Weir House residents' drinking was the cause of media coverage, with near-by Kelburn residents concerned about noise and litter.

In June 2017, Victoria University proposed that the position of Head of Hall across its six halls be cut, and replaced by three Hall General Managers. The cited reason was that students had stated in a survey that pastoral care was not important to them.

Today, students affectionately refer to it as "queer house" due to the large portion of LGBTQ students who live there.

== Notable alumni ==
- Geoffrey Palmer (politician), former Prime Minister of New Zealand
- Conrad Smith, former All Black centre
- Simon Power, former Minister of Justice of New Zealand
- Alan MacDiarmid, recipient of the Nobel Prize for Chemistry in 2000
- Darren Hughes, former Minister of Statistics
- Todd Barclay, former Member of Parliament
- Guy Williams, comedian
- Melanie Lynskey, film and television actor
- Sir Paul Holmes, broadcaster
- Bill Sheat, lawyer and advocate for the arts
