= Old Natchez Trace segments listed on the National Register of Historic Places =

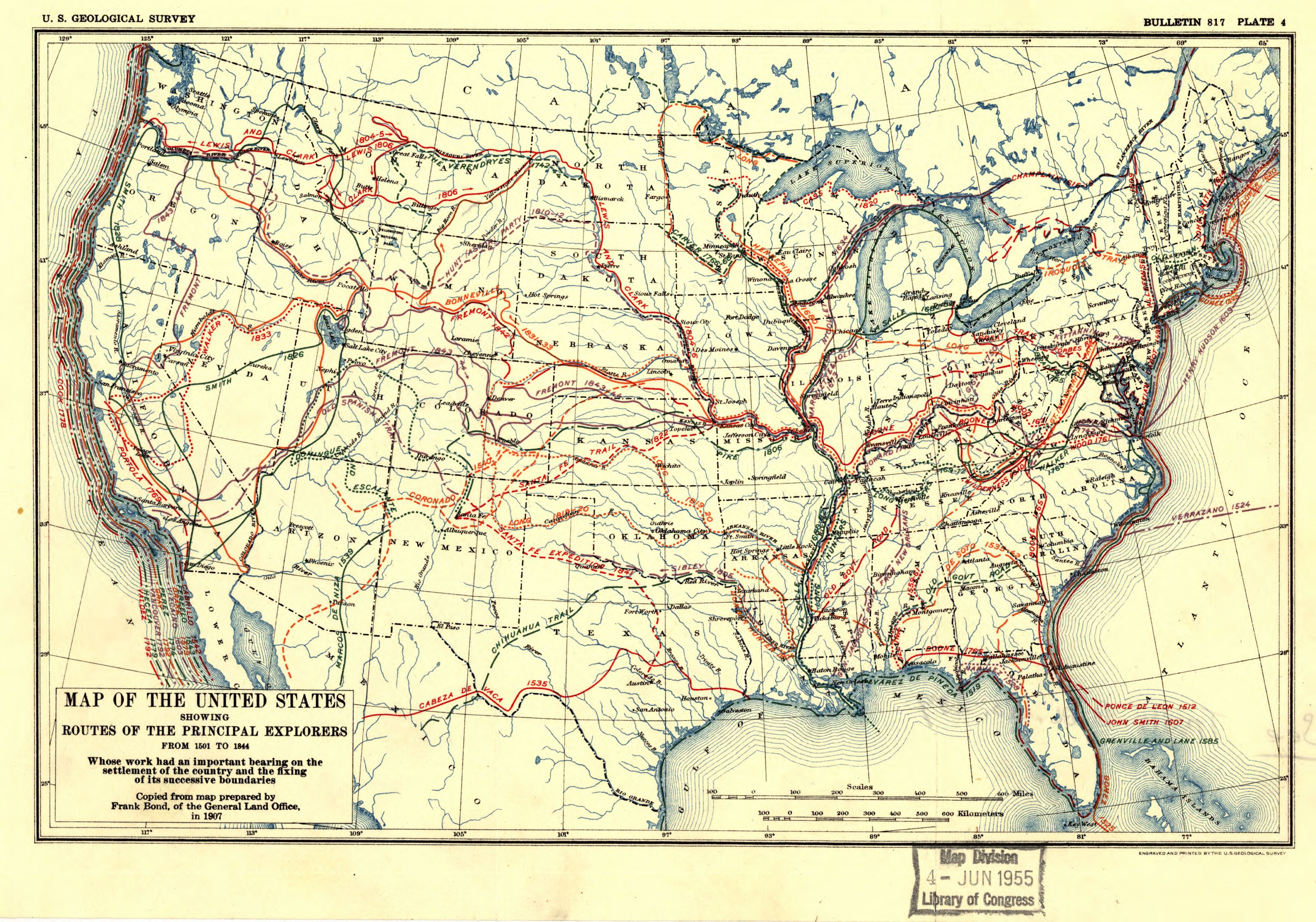
Natchez Trace mapped as "Old Govt. Road" in 1907

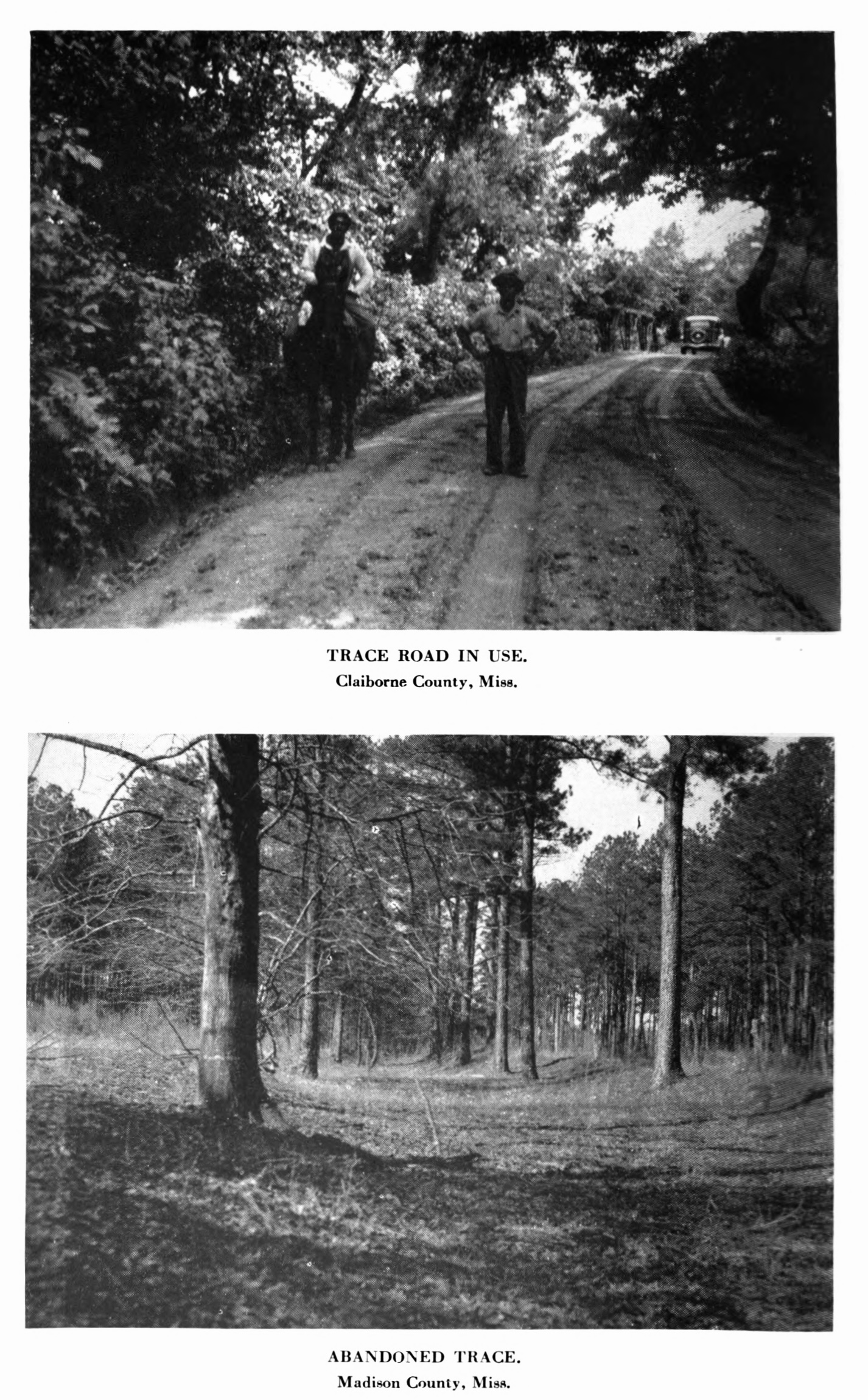
Segments of the Old Natchez Trace in Mississippi photographed for the Parkway survey in the 1930s

Seven segments of the historic Natchez Trace are listed on the National Register of Historic Places (NRHP). Also there are additional NRHP-listed structures and other sites along the Natchez Trace, which served the travelers of the trace and survive from the era of its active use.

== Segments ==
One segment within Tennessee is named simply "Old Natchez Trace". Additionally, several segments in Mississippi and Alabama are listed with the name "Old Natchez Trace", followed by a secondary identifier in parentheses or by an additional name. These listings are:

=== Old Natchez Trace in Tennessee ===
- Old Natchez Trace
- U.S. National Register of Historic Places
- Area: 2,800 acres (1,100 ha)
- NRHP reference No.: 75002125
- Added to NRHP: May 30, 1975

The Old Natchez Trace in Tennessee, is a large length of the Natchez Trace spanning several counties of Tennessee. It is listed on the National Register under the name Old Natchez Trace. The NRHP-listed linear district follows one route of the old Natchez Trace, but does not include other branches. For example, at Old Town in Franklin, Tennessee, a different branch crossed Brown's Creek. The counties spanned by the listing are: Lawrence, Hickman, Wayne, Williamson, Lewis, Davidson, and Maury County, Tennessee.

=== Old Natchez Trace (132-3T) ===
- Old Natchez Trace (132-3T)
- U.S. National Register of Historic Places
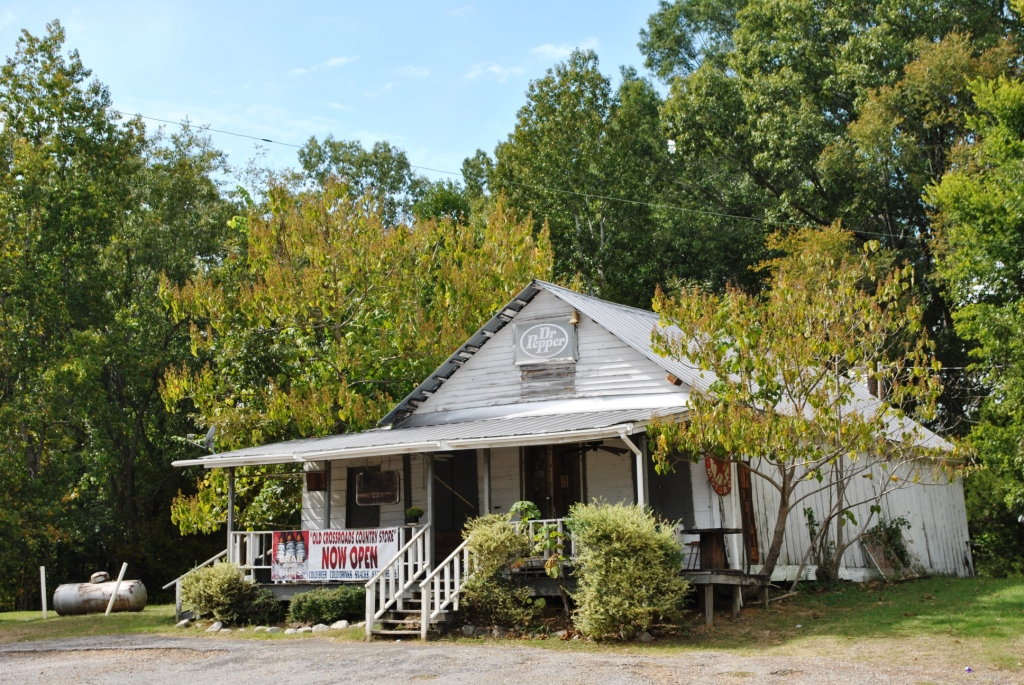
- Nearest city: Port Gibson, Mississippi
- Coordinates: 32°0′10″N 90°53′46″W
- Area: 0.89 acres (0.36 ha)
- Built: 1801
- NRHP reference No.: 76000161
- Added to NRHP: November 7, 1976

Old Natchez Trace (132-3T), located northeast of Port Gibson in Claiborne County, Mississippi, about 0.7 miles north of the Mangum Mound Site at milepost 45.7. The site is also known as the Grindstone Ford. It is an original segment of the Natchez Trace. According to history of Claiborne County, the name comes from "iron stone rock found especially suitable for mill stones. An early traveler on crossing the bayou over this ford spoke of his joy at hearing the heels of his horse ringing on the broad rocky pavement when ascending the bank of this stream from the water after passing more than two years in the stoneless soil of this region." Mrs. Humphreys, mother of future Confederate general and Reconstruction-era governor Benjamin Grubb Humphreys, settled at Grindstone Ford in 1786.

The British traveler Francis Bailey described it in his journal of 1797, "...about sundown got to Grindstone Ford. This is the principal branch of the Bayou Pierre, and is situated about fifty or sixty miles from its mouth. The settlements about are not very numerous. There was formerly a mill built across the stream; but, owing to a curious circumstance, this has shared the fate of all other water-mills in the country: for it must be observed that there are a great many crayfish hereabouts, and these animals undermine all the dams which have ever been built, and soon make a vent for the water, which terminates in the total destruction of the dam. This place is situated about sixty miles from Natchez, and is the most northern frontier settlement in the district. From this place, then, we have to date our departure into the wilderness; and here we have to bid adieu to all marks of civilization till we arrive at the borders of the Cumberland river, in the state of Tennessee, a distance of about six hundred miles." There was post office at Grindstone Ford, initially minded by Daniel Burnett, beginning in 1815. According to Dr. James F. McCaleb writing in 1915, "During the threatened outbreak of the Choctaw and Creek Indians in 1813, the frontier committee erected the Grindstone Ford Fort near Willow Springs, Claiborne county, and the Mississippi panic of 1813 caused by the massacre of Fort Miner hurried the erection of block houses in the Natchez District. The Grindstone Fort became the property of George Lemon who converted it into a ball room in connection with his tavern sometimes called up to 1872, the Lemon Hotel. This fort or ball room had the port holes up to the time it was removed for outer buildings on the farm of J. H. Nelson, but its foundations can still be seen..."

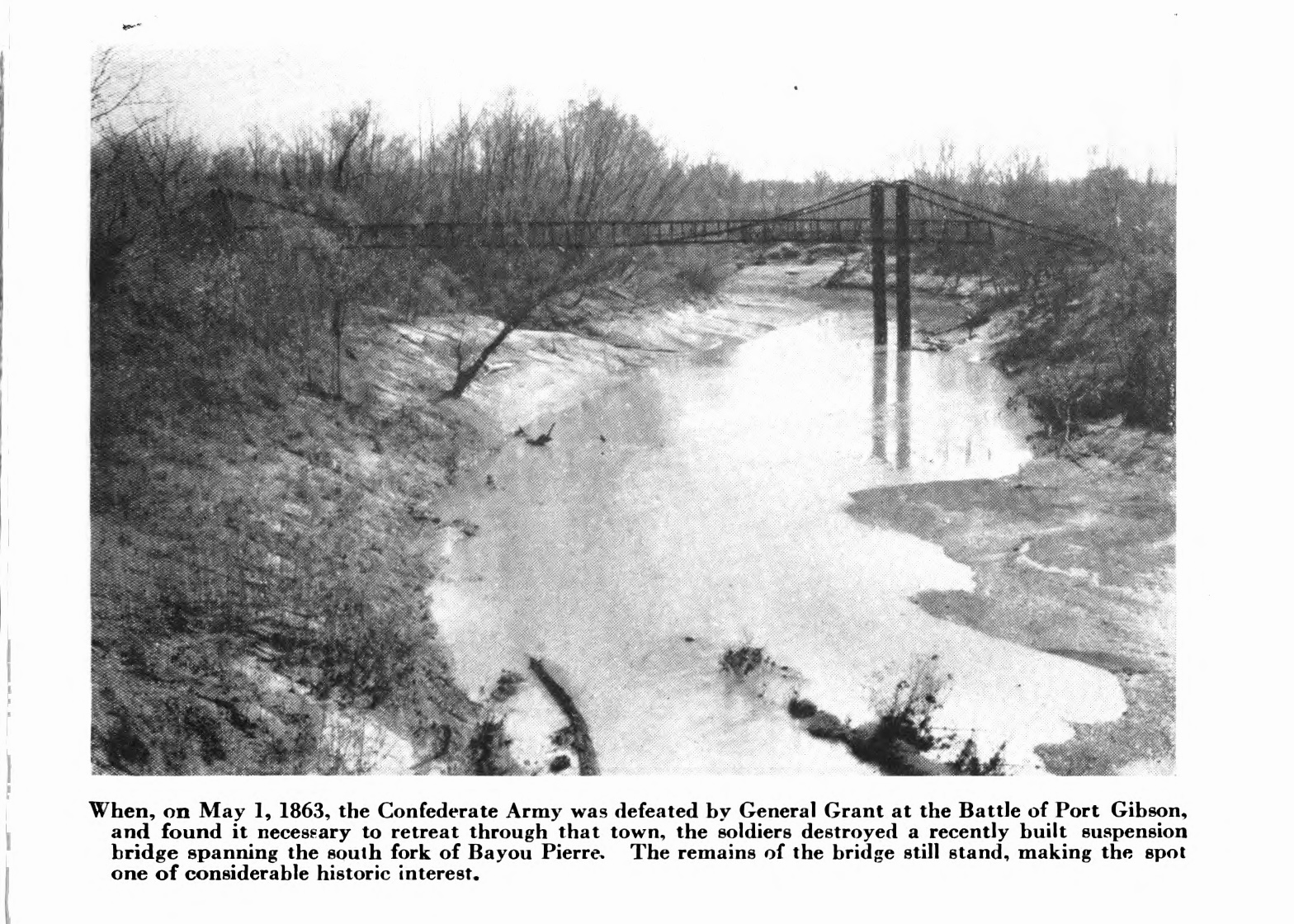
Bayou Pierre 1930s

The presence of the Natchez Road figured in the May 1, 1863 Battle of Port Gibson. In that battle, Union forces under General Ulysses S. Grant's command, having crossed from the Louisiana side of the Mississippi, below Vicksburg, fought their way through a determined resistance by Confederate forces which at first bottled them up. The Natchez Road was not located by the Union forces early in the battle. Confederate General Bowen was concerned throughout the day's battle that Union forces would locate the Natchez Road and march directly upon Port Gibson, around Bowen's flank. Bowen committed forces to attack the much larger Union forces in order to prevent them from finding it. Eventually increasing numbers of Union troops threatened to overwhelm the Confederate forces and retreat was ordered, apparently without any flanking action along the Natchez Road taking place. The Union troops occupied Port Gibson on May 2.

=== Old Natchez Trace (170-30) ===
- Old Natchez Trace (170-30)
- U.S. National Register of Historic Places
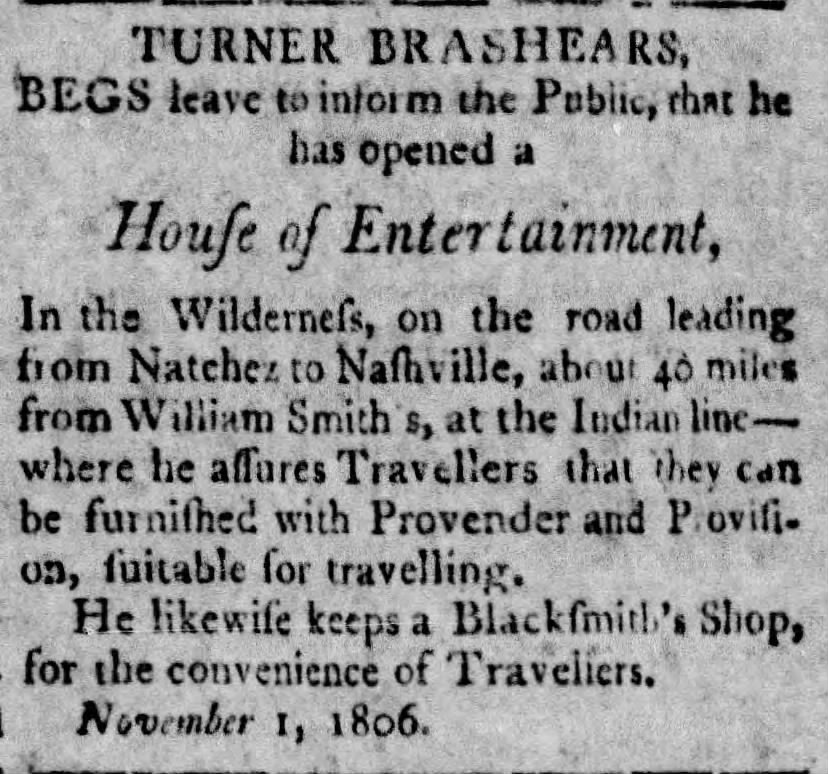
- The Mississippi Messenger, November 11, 1806
- Nearest city: Ridgeland, Mississippi
- Coordinates: 32°25′27″N 90°5′19″W
- Area: 0.41 acres (0.17 ha)
- Built: 1801
- NRHP reference No.: 76000160
- Added to NRHP: November 7, 1976

Old Natchez Trace (170-30), a 0.4-acre (0.16 ha) area listed in 1976. It preserves two separate remnants of the old Trace near milepost 104.5 and includes the site of Brashears' Stand, an inn operated by Turner Brashears from 1806 on. It is located just outside the eastern city limits of Ridgeland, Mississippi. After 1850 it was known as King's Inn.

=== Old Natchez Trace (212-3K 213-3K) ===
- Old Natchez Trace (212-3K 213-3K)
- U.S. National Register of Historic Places
- Nearest city: Kosciusko, Mississippi
- Coordinates: 33°12′46″N 89°27′11″W
- Area: 1.1 acres (0.45 ha)
- Built: 1735
- NRHP reference No.: 76000203
- Added to NRHP: November 7, 1976

Old Natchez Trace (212-3K 213-3K), located northeast of Kosciusko in Attala County, Mississippi, near milepost 174.

=== Old Natchez Trace (230-3H) ===
- Old Natchez Trace (230-3H)
- U.S. National Register of Historic Places
- Nearest city: Mathiston, Mississippi
- Coordinates: 33°28′32″N 89°12′4″W
- Area: 1.03 acres (0.42 ha)
- Built: 1801
- NRHP reference No.: 76000159
- Added to NRHP: November 7, 1976

Old Natchez Trace (230-3H), located southwest of Mathiston in Choctaw County, Mississippi, near milepost 199. It is located south of Mathiston at Natchez Trace Parkway milepost 198. It is a segment of the Natchez Trace located at a Natchez Trace Parkway interpretive stop.

=== Old Natchez Trace (310-2A) ===
- Old Natchez Trace (310-2A)
- U.S. National Register of Historic Places
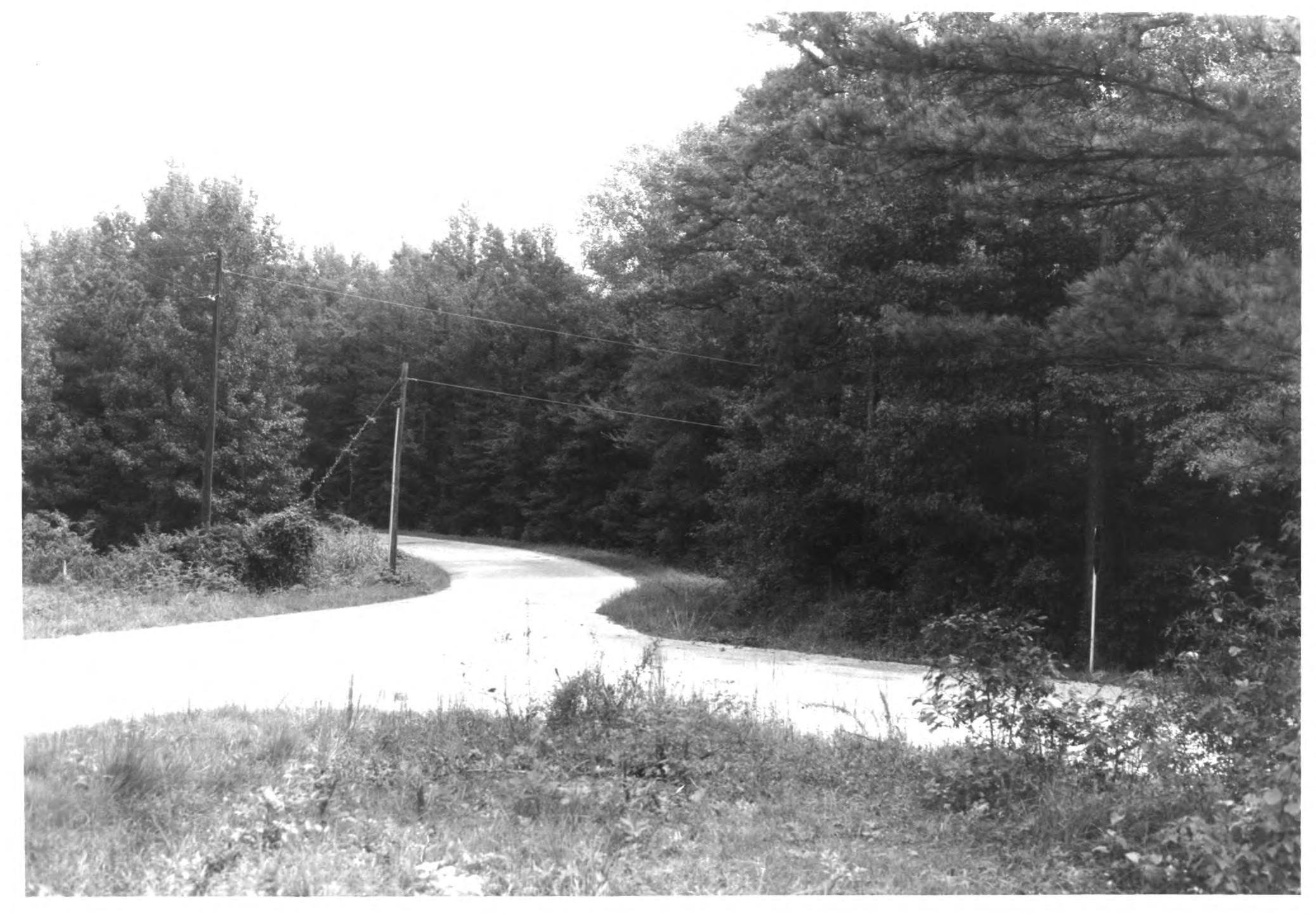
- Paved portion of site 310-2A, along the left
- Nearest city: Florence, Alabama
- Coordinates: 34°55′31″N 87°50′40″W
- Area: 0.86 acres (0.35 ha)
- Built: 1801
- NRHP reference No.: 76000156
- Added to NRHP: November 7, 1976

Old Natchez Trace (310-2A), a 0.86-acre (0.35 ha) area listed in 1976 located 15 miles northwest of Florence, Alabama, off Alabama State Route 20 near milepost 336. It preserves a 400-foot section of the old Natchez Trace that had not been paved as of the mid-1970s, and an 850-foot section that has been paved. The paved portion is part of Lauderdale County's County Route 5. The location is near to, and just southeast of, the Little Zion Church and the Cloverdale School, which in turn are south of the hamlet of Threet, Alabama. Beyond the listed segment, the construction of Highway 20 "obliterated" evidence of the historic Natchez Trace.

=== Old Natchez Trace and Choctaw Agency Site ===
- Old Natchez Trace and Choctaw Agency Site
- U.S. National Register of Historic Places
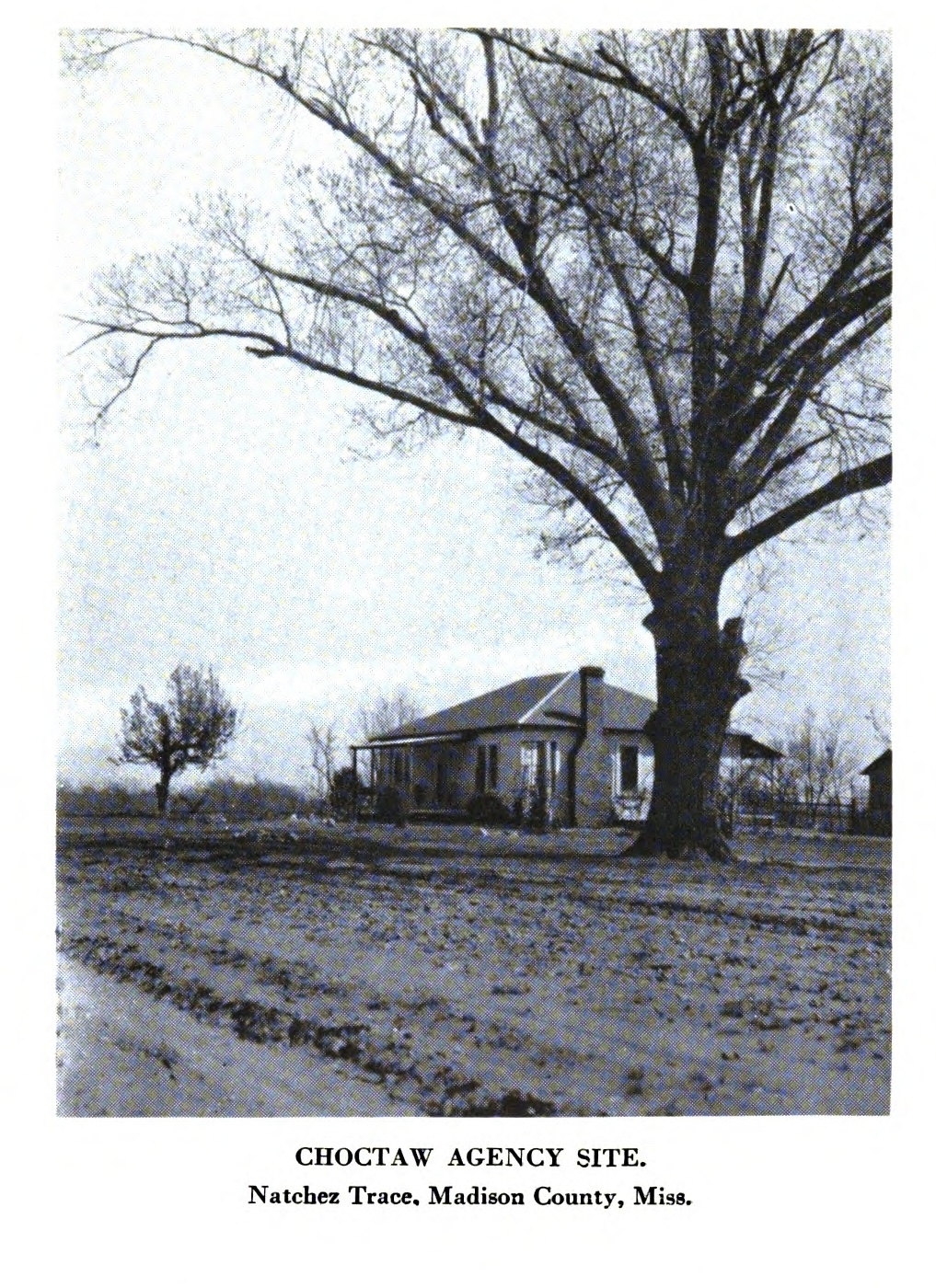
- Site of Choctaw Agency in Madison County Mississippi, photographed c. 1938
- Nearest city: Ridgeland, Mississippi
- Coordinates: 32°25′36″N 90°10′37″W
- Area: 47 acres (19 ha)
- Built: 1801
- NRHP reference No.: 94001579
- Added to NRHP: December 15, 1994

Old Natchez Trace and Choctaw Agency Site, in Ridgeland, Mississippi located at milepost 100.7. This is located between Interstate 55 and Livingston Rd., west of Ridgeland, in Madison County, Mississippi. It includes a 3.3-mile segment of the Natchez Trace (partially in the Natchez Trace Parkway right of way) and an archeological investigation site at the location that from 1811 to 1823 housed a government agency to the Choctaw. According to the 1941 Natchez Trace Parkway survey report, "Before the Treaty of Doak's Stand, the Choctaw Agency was located on the Trace, about 10 miles north of what is now Jackson, or about two miles west of Ridgeland on United States Highway 51. The Agency is not different from other Indian agencies in its historical background. It was the residence of the United States Agent, who, in addition to numerous other duties, for a time at least, checked the passports of travelers over the Trace. Before the inns were established on the Trace, the agencies were havens for the sick and weary travelers. The Choctaw Agency is closely associated with the history of the Trace. No remains of the old agency exist but a modern dwelling marks the site."

== Related NRHP-listed places ==
Also there are additional NRHP-listed structures and other sites along the Natchez Trace. These include:

- Old Town, Franklin, Tennessee, once the site of a Mississippian mound complex and Native American village located adjacent to the Trace and the Harpeth River. and more recently the location of an 1801 bridge built to carry the Natchez Trace road across Brown's Creek and a house built in the 1840s or 1850s. All three properties are listed on the National Register.
- Col. James Drane House, an antebellum house located at mile marker 180.7 on the Natchez Trace Parkway, at French Camp in Choctaw County, Mississippi. The history of this house, from 1846, is mixed up with the history of the trace itself, and the home is a visitor's attraction along the modern Natchez Trace Parkway, which it adjoins.

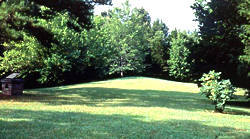
Boyd Mounds Site

- Boyd Mounds Site (22MD512), a mound complex near Ridgeland in Madison County, Mississippi, at Mile 106.9 on the Natchez Trace Parkway, listed on the National Register as an archaeological site. It has six mounds and is situated next to a parking area off the Natchez Trace Parkway, accessible to visitors.
- Janet's Mound, also listed as an archeological site with a restricted address, located at or near French Camp in Choctaw County, Mississippi

== See also ==
- National Register of Historic Places listings in Lauderdale County, Alabama
- National Register of Historic Places listings in Attala County, Mississippi
- National Register of Historic Places listings in Choctaw County, Mississippi
- National Register of Historic Places listings in Claiborne County, Mississippi
- National Register of Historic Places listings in Madison County, Mississippi
- National Register of Historic Places listings in Davidson County, Tennessee
- National Register of Historic Places listings in Hickman County, Tennessee
- National Register of Historic Places listings in Lawrence County, Tennessee
- National Register of Historic Places listings in Lewis County, Tennessee
- National Register of Historic Places listings in Maury County, Tennessee
- National Register of Historic Places listings in Wayne County, Tennessee
- National Register of Historic Places listings in Williamson County, Tennessee
