= Threet, Alabama =

Unincorporated community in Alabama, United States

- Unincorporated community
- Location within Alabama Location within the United States
- Coordinates: 34°57′02″N 87°49′44″W
- Country: United States
- State: Alabama
- County: Lauderdale
- Elevation: 643 ft (196 m)
- Time zone: UTC-6 (Central (CST))
  - Summer (DST): UTC-5 (CDT)
- Area codes: 256 & 938
- GNIS feature ID: 157157

Threet is an unincorporated community in Lauderdale County, in the U.S. state of Alabama. A National Register of Historic Places-listed portion of the Natchez Trace, the Old Natchez Trace (310-2A), is located nearby.
