= Col. John Weir House =

Historic house in Mississippi, United States

- U.S. National Register of Historic Places
- Location within Mississippi Location within the United States
- Location: 102 Ann Street, Weir, Mississippi
- Coordinates: 33°15′28″N 89°17′19″W
- Area: less than one acre
- Built: 1878
- Built by: Col John Weir
- Architect: Bill McCameron
- Architectural style: Greek Revival
- NRHP reference No.: 97001378
- Added to NRHP: November 7, 1997

The Col. John Weir House is a historic house in Weir, Mississippi, U.S.

== History ==
The house was built in 1878 for Colonel John Weir, a veteran of the 3rd Mississippi Battalion of the Confederate States Army during the American Civil War whose family were landowners in the Antebellum Era. The Canton, Aberdeen and Nashville Railroad was built with a stop in Weir in 1883, and Weir donated some of his land to create the small town of Weir, Mississippi in 1884. He also served as its founding postmaster, and continued to live in the house until his death in 1900. The house remained in the Weir family until 1985.

The house was subsequently acquired by the Weir Historical Society. It is now a bed and breakfast.

== Architectural significance ==
The house was designed in the Greek Revival architectural style. It has been listed on the National Register of Historic Places since November 7, 1997.
