= Janet's Mound =

- U.S. National Register of Historic Places
- Nearest city: French Camp, Mississippi
- Area: 0.3 acres (0.12 ha)
- NRHP reference No.: 90002125
- Added to NRHP: January 11, 1991

Janet's Mound, also known as site 22-Ch-520, is an archeological site in the general area of French Camp, Mississippi. Its specific location is not disclosed, but the site is more significant for its location in an area of the state which has few mounds and where little archeological research of mounds has been conducted.

The mound has circumference of approximately 60 metres (200 ft) and is from 1.25 metres (4.1 ft) to 1.75 metres (5.7 ft) high. It appears to have once been conical in shape but has been damaged by a pothole dug by, presumably, amateurs or professionals seeking artifacts.

In 1991, an area of approximately 0.3 acres (0.12 ha) in size including the mound was listed on the National Register of Historic Places, for its potential to yield information in the future. As of its listing date, little was known about the site, beyond that it is associated with the Woodland and/or Mississippian cultures.

Its specific location is not public.
