= Victoria House (Victoria University of Wellington) =

- Victoria University of Wellington
- Location: The Terrace, Wellington
- Coordinates: 41.289897°S 174.771177°E
- Motto in English: Friendship, Community, Success
- Established: 1907
- Former names: Women Student's Hostel Society
- Head: Jason Auva'a
- Undergraduates: 182
- Website: www.vichouse.org

Victoria House is a privately owned residential college of Victoria University of Wellington located in the city of Wellington in New Zealand. It is home to 182 undergraduates, typically first year students. Opened in 1907 as the Women Student's Hostel Society, Victoria House is the oldest hall of residence at Victoria University of Wellington, and the second hall of residence for women students in New Zealand.

== History ==
In the early years of the twentieth century Margaret Wallis (the wife of the Bishop Frederic Wallis, Anglican Bishop of Wellington), Jean Gibb (wife of Rev Dr James Gibb, minister of St John's Presbyterian Church) and a group of other like-minded women recognised the need for a hostel for women who had come to Wellington to undertake study at Victoria University of Wellington and the Wellington Teachers' Training College. This group of women formed the Women Student's Hostel Society, and the outcome of their initial efforts was a two-storied wooden building at 282 the Terrace, which accommodated 29 residents. A kitchen, dining and sitting room, and accommodation for the matron - the person who ran the hostel - were included.

Opened in 1907, this building is still part of Victoria House. Almost immediately the building was finished, the Society purchased the cottage next door (280 The Terrace), using it for additional accommodation. This was the first of many acquisitions of adjacent or nearby properties over the next century. In the mid-1950s, the original building was extensively refurbished and extended over the site of the adjacent cottage, providing a few additional rooms, and improved kitchen facilities, dining room and common room.

Then in the early 1970s, a five-storeyed accommodation block – later called Wallis Wing – was built across the back of all the old houses the Society had acquired from 280 to 288 The Terrace. As before, the opportunity was taken to build a new kitchen and dining room to accommodate the greatly increased numbers of residents, and as a consequence the original hostel building was refurbished once again.

Some of the old houses along The Terrace were subsequently removed to enable construction of the modern buildings now known as Pope House (opened in 1993), and the Bennett Houses. Most recently, 9 Maurice Terrace (behind Wallis Wing) was reconstructed as Hutchison House (2013). In 2014 seismic strengthening was undertaken of Wallis Wing and a progressive refurbishment programme for the building was started, the first stage of which was completed in early 2015.

== Notable alumni ==
- Andrew Little, Mayor of Wellington and former leader of the Labour Party
- Patrick Gower, journalist
- Simon Power, former Minister of Justice (Power was not a resident at the hostel but rather employed as a Deputy Warden)
