= Natchez Trace =

Historic trail in the southern United States

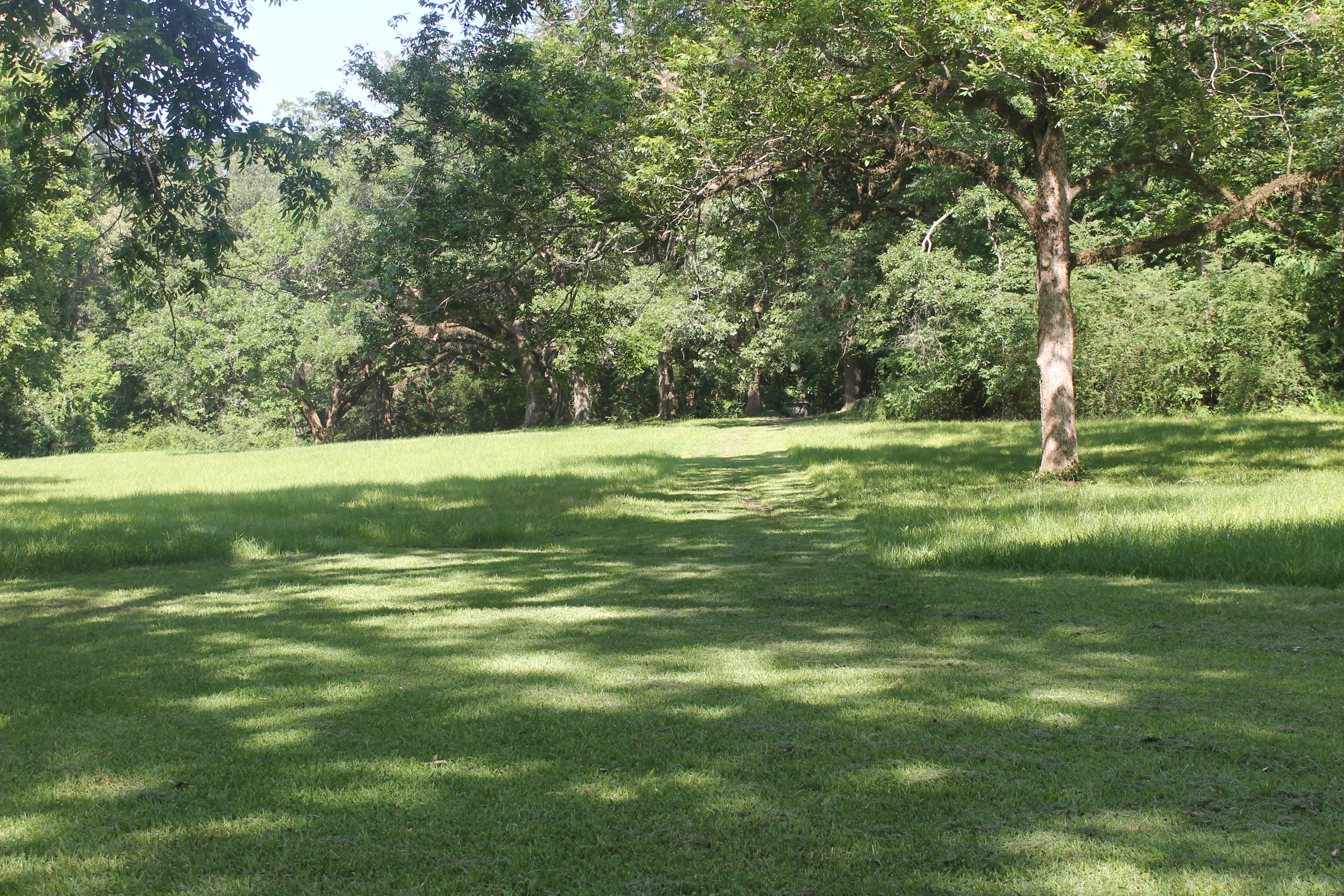
Part of the original Natchez Trace near Natchez, Mississippi

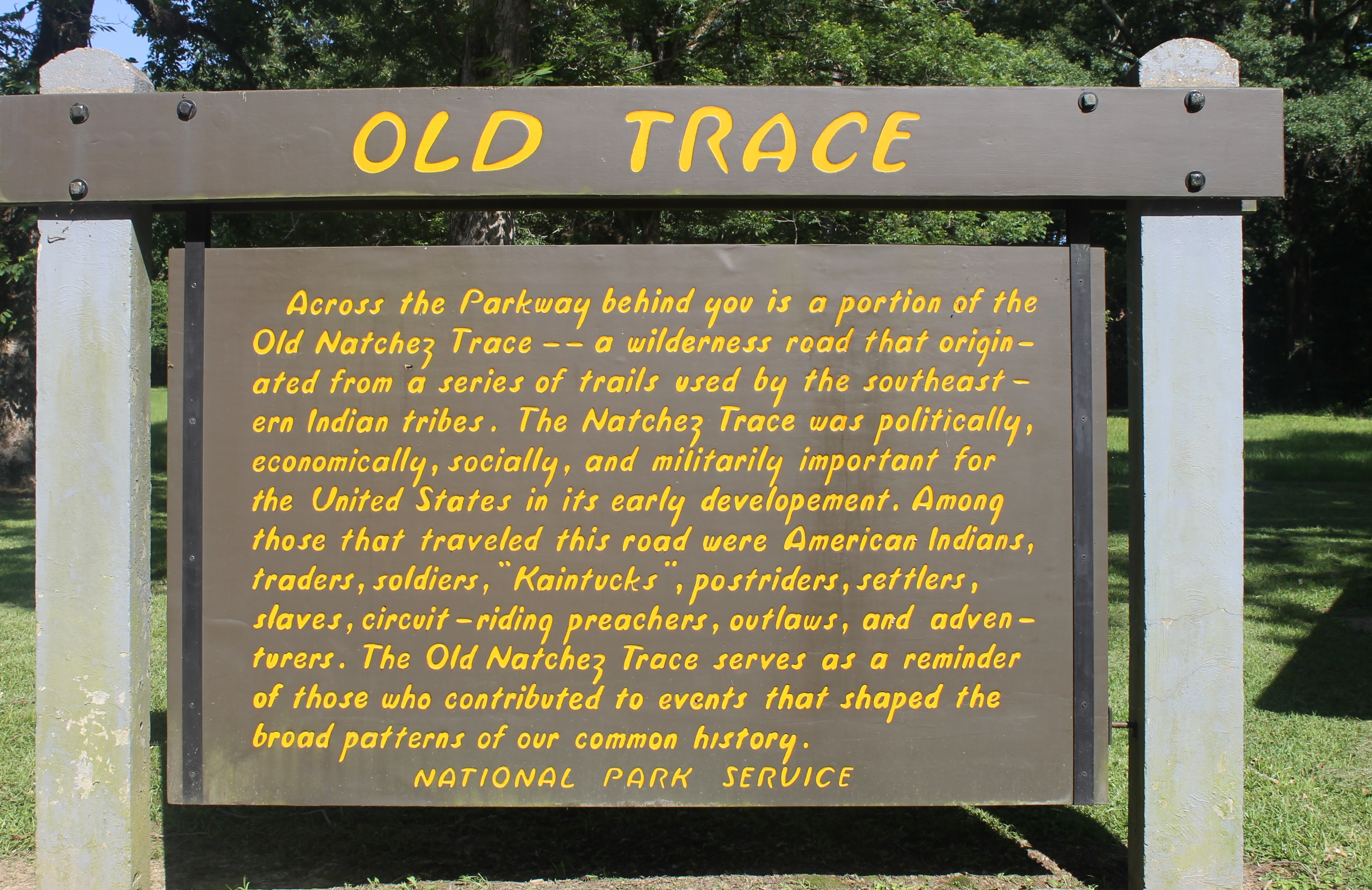
Old Trace historical marker

The Natchez Trace, also known as the Old Natchez Trace, was a historic forest trail within the Southeastern United States which extended roughly 440 miles (710 km) from Nashville, Tennessee, to Natchez, Mississippi, linking the Cumberland, Tennessee, and Mississippi rivers. It also passed through Alabama.

Native Americans created and used the trail for centuries. Early European and American explorers, traders, and immigrants used it in the late 18th and early 19th centuries. European Americans founded inns, also known as "stands", along the Trace to serve food and lodging to travelers. Most of these stands closed as travel shifted to steamboats on the Mississippi and other rivers. The heyday of the Trace began in the 1770s and ended in the 1820s; by the 1830s, the route was already in disrepair and its time as a major interregional commercial route had come to an end.

Today, the path is commemorated by the 444-mile (715 km) Natchez Trace Parkway, which follows the approximate path of the Trace, as well as the related Natchez Trace Trail. Parts of the original trail are still accessible, and some segments are listed on the National Register of Historic Places.

== Origins ==
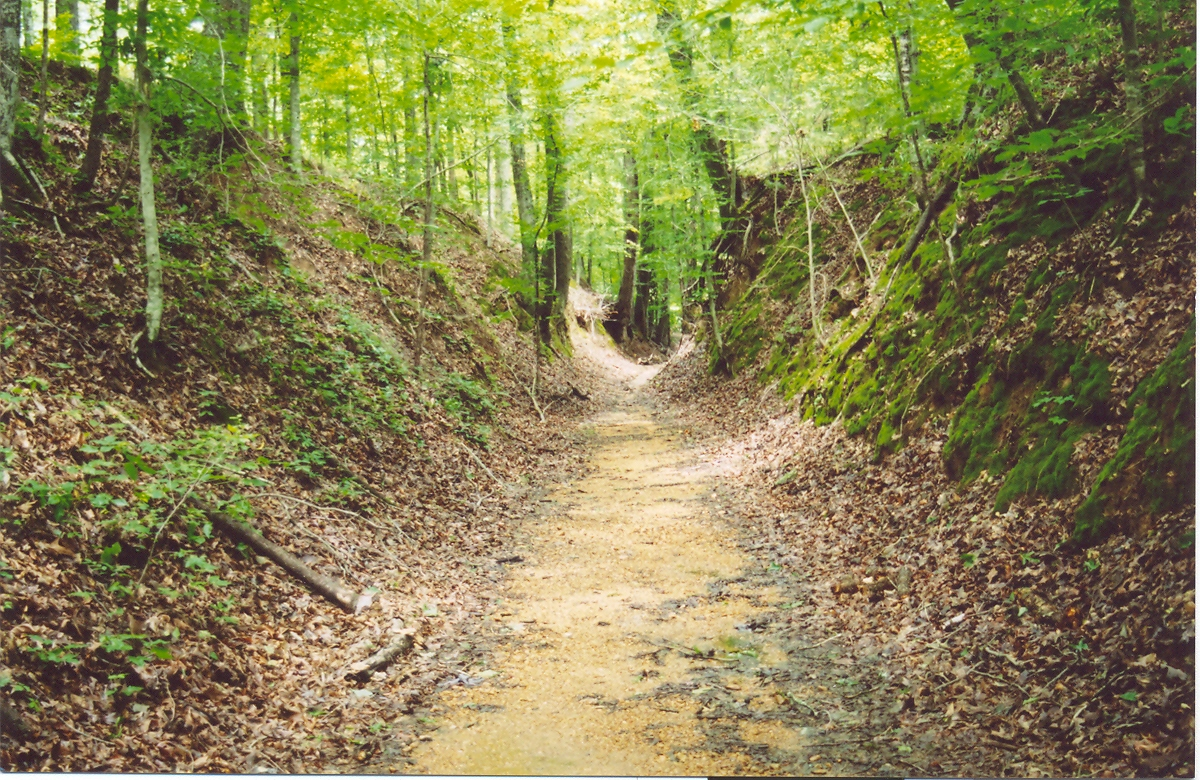
The "Sunken Trace", one of the remaining parts of the old trail

Largely following a geologic ridge line, prehistoric animals followed the dry ground of the Trace to distant grazing lands, the salt licks of today's Middle Tennessee, and to the Mississippi River. Native Americans used many early footpaths created by the foraging of bison, deer, and other large game that could break paths through the dense undergrowth. In the case of the Trace, bison traveled north to find salt licks in the Nashville area.

After Native Americans began to settle the land, they blazed the trail and improved it further until it became a relatively well-established path. Numerous prehistoric indigenous settlements in Mississippi were established along the Natchez Trace. Among them were the 2,000-year-old Pharr Mounds of the Middle Woodland period, located near present-day Tupelo, Mississippi.

The first recorded European explorer to travel the Trace in its entirety was an unnamed Frenchman in 1742, who wrote of the trail and its "miserable conditions". Early European explorers depended on the assistance of Native American guides to go through this territory — specifically, the Choctaw and Chickasaw who occupied the region. These tribes and earlier prehistoric peoples, collectively known as the Mississippian culture, had long used the Trace for trade. The Chickasaw leader, Chief Piomingo, made use of the trail so often that it became known as Piominko's Path during his lifetime. Another early common name was Trail to the Chickasaw Nation.

== Development ==
According to Methodist circuit preacher J. G. Jones, who traveled the lower Mississippi region for many years as part of his work, "Besides the water route, following the eastern tributaries of the Mississippi River to the Father of Waters and floating down to the point of debarkation, there were three land routes—mere horse-paths—opened through the Indian country to Natchez and other settlements on the Lower Mississippi. These were maintained by the Government for mail routes, by treaty stipulations with the Indian tribes. The first began at Nashville, and crossed the Tennessee River at Colbert's ferry, below the Muscle Shoals; thence through the Choctaw and Chickasaw Nation to the Grindstone Ford on Bayou Pierre, ending at Natchez and Fort Adams. The second began at Knoxville, and passed through the Cherokee Nation by way of the Tellico and Tombigbee rivers to Natchez. The third was from the Oconee settlements, in Georgia, through the Creek Nation across the Alabama River in the direction of St. Steven's, on westwardly to Natchez. The traders of the Upper Mississippi River and its tributaries, who brought down their produce in flatboats, were accustomed to return on foot or horseback by the first route—called the Nashville and Natchez trace—and hence it became best known." In his letters, Andrew Jackson referred to the path from Natchez to Nashville as a journey through "the wilderness." Surveyor and land speculator Thomas Freeman described the Trace in early days as "an impenetrable forest condensed by cane and cemented by grape vines, so that a dozen trees must be cut before one can fall..." British traveler Francis Bailydescribed the rustic nature of the Natchez road in his journal of a 1796–97 trip, with the one-room "tavern" at Grindstone Ford being so unpleasant that he preferred to sleep outside under a tree. Baily also wrote about "encamping grounds", describing wide places in the road, especially at river fords, that were identified by the presence of felled trees, extinguished campfires, and compacted soil. In times of high water, travelers would swim across the intervening rivers and streams, accompanied by cargo rafts built on the spot, so that provisions and supplies could stay dry. According to an Ohioan, travelers returning northeast on the trace usually went on Opelousas horses, "a small breed of mixed Spanish and Indian...very hardy and accustomed to subsist on grass and the bark of trees. To every three or four persons there was one or more spare horses to carry the baggage." Still, despite its unimproved nature, the trail was already a well-trafficked trade route in the 1790s—a stretch of the southern section was called the Path to the Choctaw Nation, and the run from Tupelo to Nashville was called the Chickasaw Trace—and Choctaw, Spanish, and American leaders alike were preoccupied with protecting and extending their access to the road.

Boatmen returning to the United States from Natchez were surrounded by plantations and settlers until, 65 mi (105 km) they reached the Grindstone Ford on Bayou Pierre. Before taverns were established along the rest of the route under treaty with the Choctaw, the Grindstone Ford "was the last civilized dwelling before Nashville." From there, the trace followed a ridge between the Yazoo River and the Tombigbee River, and "at the head of the Tombigbee was the Big Town of the Chickasaw, and near it were many abandoned peach and apple orchards." The Trace continued 40 mi (64 km) past the Big Town to the Tennessee River, and there James Colbert's ferry; Colbert was said to make $2,000 a year in ferriage. The 75 mi (121 km) from the Tennessee to the Duck River was said to be "the roughest country on the trace," and the route from the Duck to the Cumberland was hilly and said to be bad footing for a horse.

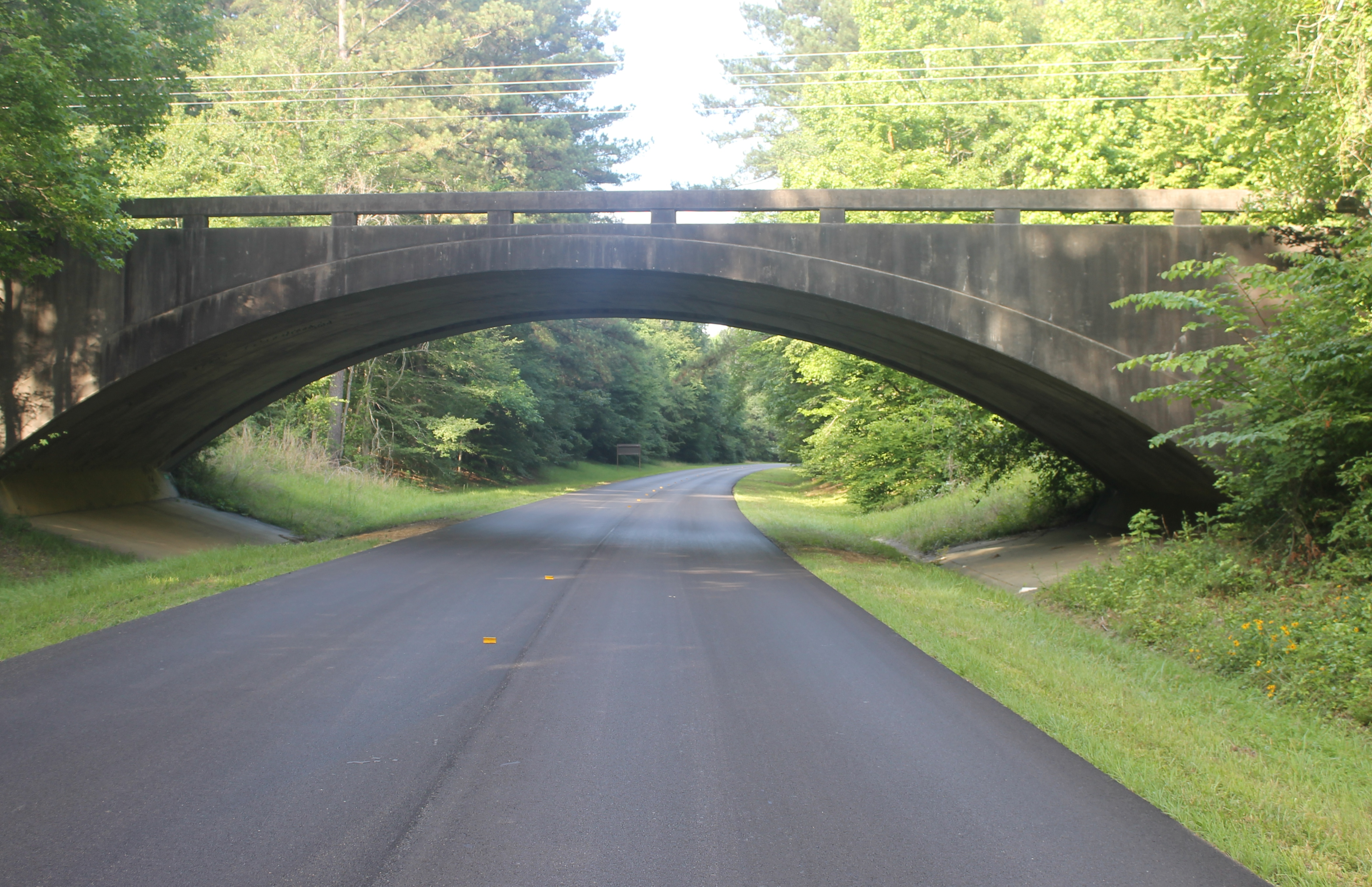
One of numerous overpasses on the Natchez Trace Parkway toward the exit to Vicksburg

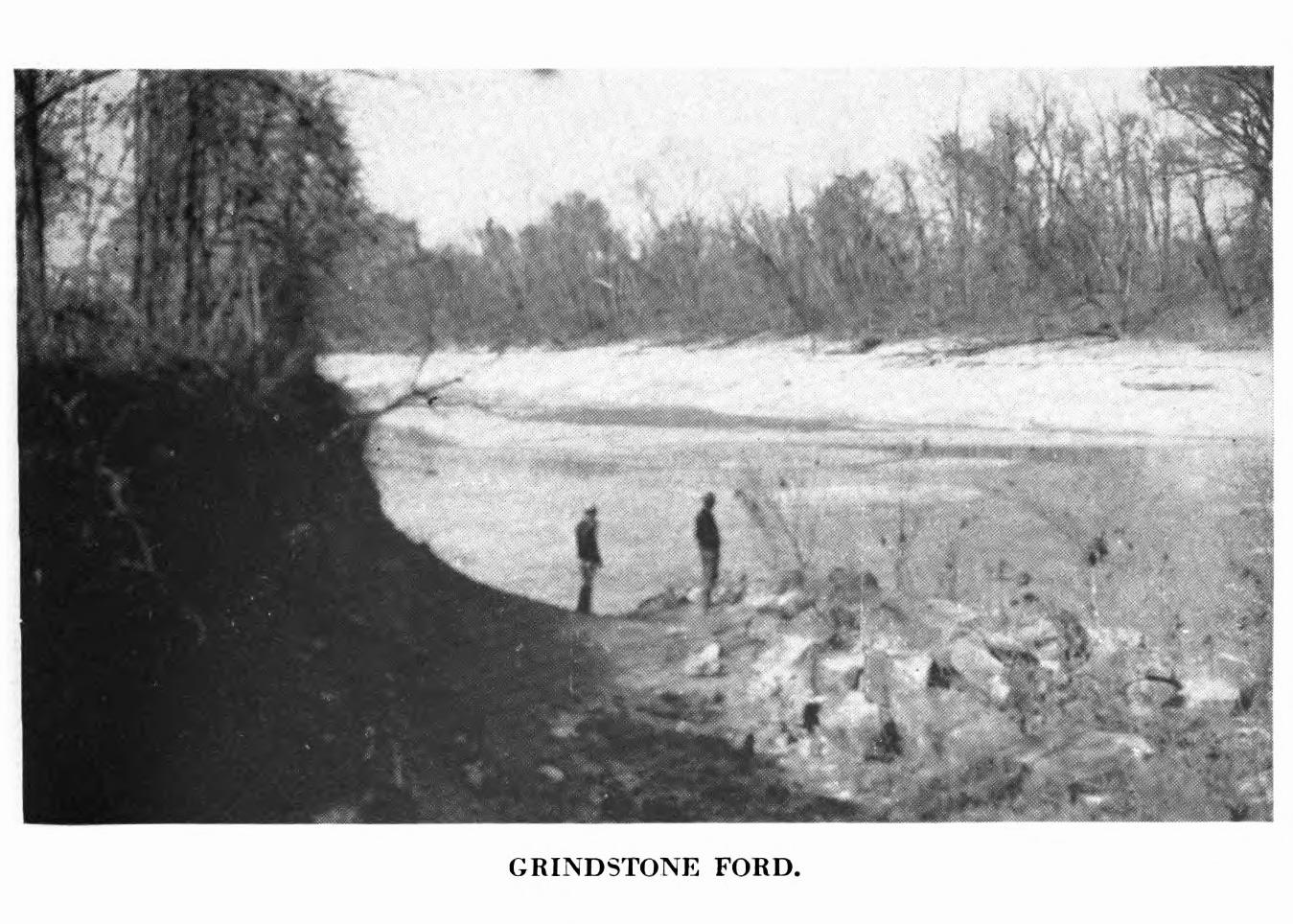
Grindstone Ford photographed c. 1938

Even before the 1803 Louisiana Purchase, President Thomas Jefferson wanted to connect the distant Mississippi frontier to other settled areas of the United States. To foster communication with what was then called the Southwest, he directed the construction of a postal road between Daniel Boone's Wilderness Road (the southern branch of the road ended at Nashville) and the Mississippi River.

James Wilkinson's survey of the Mississippi section of the trace, probably circa 1802

Tennessee River section

The U.S. signed treaties with the Chickasaw and Choctaw tribes to maintain peace as European Americans entered the area in greater numbers. In 1801, the United States Army began trailblazing along the Trace, performing major work to prepare it as a thoroughfare. The work was done by soldiers reassigned from Tennessee and later by civilian contractors. Jefferson called it the "Columbian Highway" to emphasize American sovereignty in the area. The people who used it dubbed the road "The Devil's Backbone" due to its remoteness, rough conditions, and frequently encountered highwaymen. Aaron Burr wrote to his daughter, that the "'road...you will see laid down...on the map...as having been cut by the order of the minister of war[,]...is imaginary; there is no such road.' The region between Washington, Mississippi, and the Choctaw domain was, Burr reported, 'a vile country, destitute of springs or of running water—think of drinking the nasty puddle water, covered with green scum, and full of animaculae—bah! … [H]ow glad I was to get [into the high country,] all fine, transparent, lively streams, and itself [the Tennessee] a clear, beautiful, magnificent river.'"

By 1809, the trail was fully navigable by wagon, with the northward journey taking two to three weeks. Critical to the success of the Trace as a trade route was the development of inns and trading posts, referred to at the time as "stands".

Many early migrants in Tennessee and Mississippi settled along the Natchez Trace. Some of the most prominent were Washington, Mississippi (the old capital of Mississippi); "Old" Greenville, Mississippi (where Andrew Jackson married Rachel Jackson in 1791); and Port Gibson, Mississippi. The Natchez Trace was used during the War of 1812 and the ensuing Creek War, as soldiers under Major General Andrew Jackson's command traveled southward to subdue the Red Sticks and to defend the country against invasion by the British. Jackson most likely knew the road well from his career as an interstate slave trader operating between Natchez and Nashville beginning in 1789.

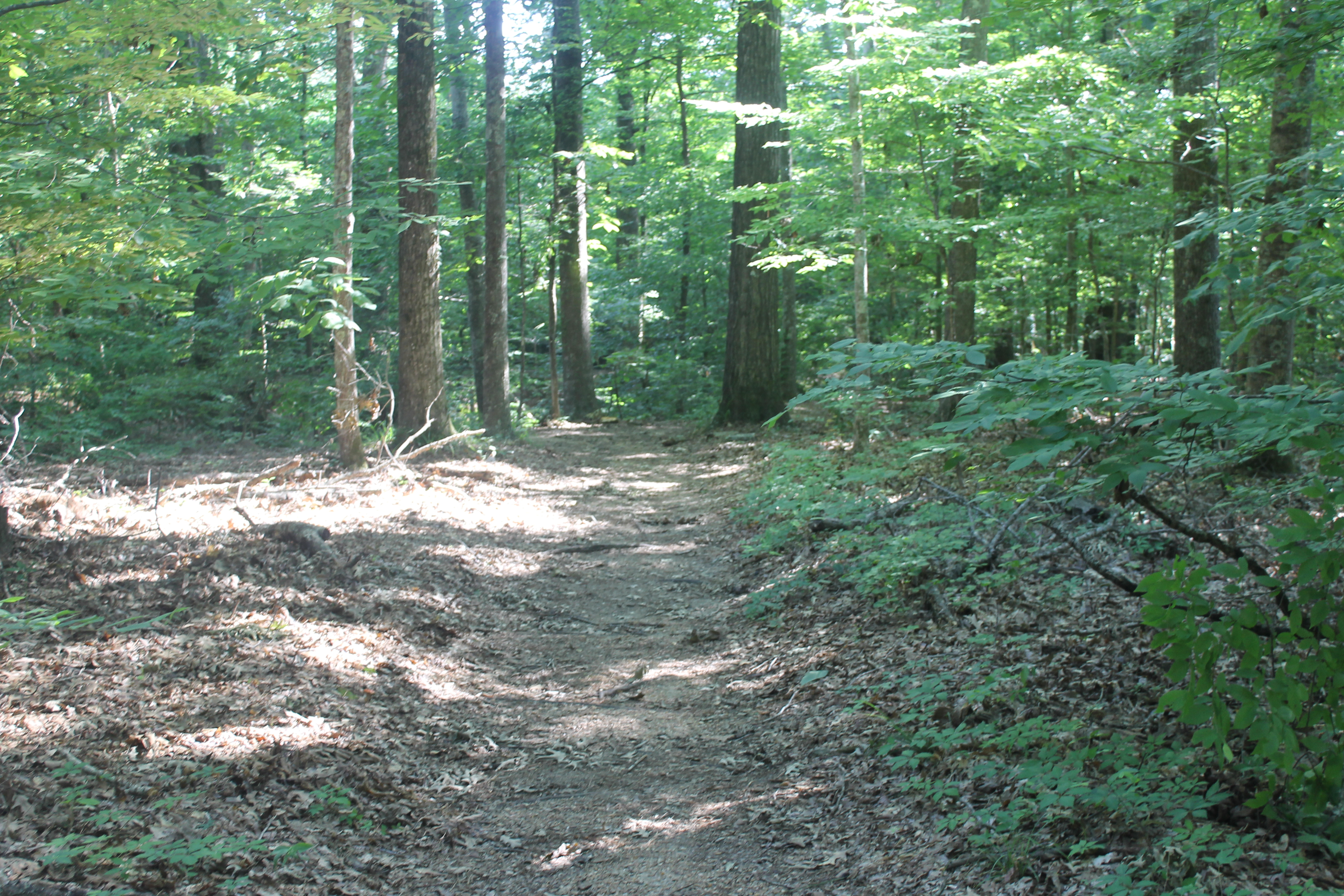
A trail on the Natchez Trace

By 1817, the continued development of Memphis (with its access to the Mississippi River) and Jackson's Military Road (heading south from Nashville) formed more direct and faster routes to New Orleans. Trade shifted to either of these routes along the east or west of the area, away from the Trace. As author William C. Davis wrote in his book A Way Through the Wilderness (1995), the Trace was "a victim of its own success" by encouraging development in the frontier area. That said, slave traders continued using the Trace, which was sometimes called the Slave Trail, to move "African-Americans, shackled and chained to each other and forced to march at gunpoint...[who were moved from] Alexandria, Virginia, marched to the Wilderness Road at Nashville; and then embarked on the Natchez Trace." Franklin & Armfield, one of the leading trading firms that used the Trace for human trafficking, were so busy "that in 1832, 5 percent of all commercial credit available through the Second Bank of the United States had been extended to their firm."

With the rise of steamboat culture on the Mississippi River after the invention of the steam engine, the Trace lost its importance as a national road, as goods could be moved more quickly, cheaply, and in greater quantity on the river. Before the invention of steam power, the Mississippi River's south-flowing current was so strong that northbound return journeys generally had to be made over land.

Although many authors have written that the Trace disappeared back into the woods, much of it was used by people living nearby. Large sections of the Trace in Tennessee were converted to county roads for operation, and sections continue to be used today.

== Early 19th century ==
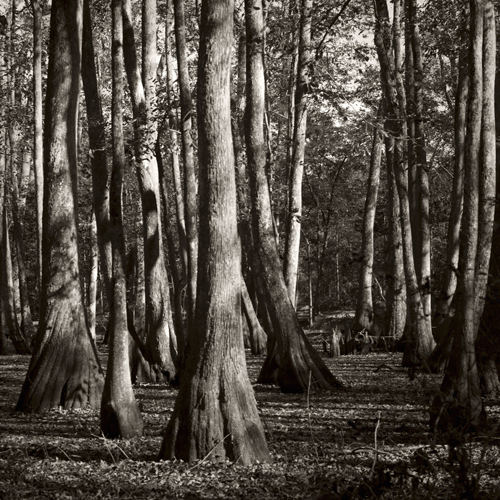
A cypress swamp along the side of the Natchez Trace near Jackson, Mississippi

Though the Natchez Trace was briefly used as a major United States route, it served an essential function for years. The Trace was the only reliable land link between the eastern states and the trading ports of Mississippi and Louisiana. All sorts of people traveled down the Trace: itinerant preachers, highwaymen, traders, and peddlers among them. The road was most heavily used for mail in the 1810s, until about 1825. The segment of the route to Natchez through Madison County in northern Alabama was known in 1809 as the Limestone Road.

In those days the mail for the Southwest was carried on horseback along the trail. A rider left Nashville every Saturday night at 8 o'clock and was due in Natchez 10 days and four hours later. His equipment consisted of his sack mail, a half bushel of corn for his horse, a blanket and for announcing his arrival when neared a settlement a bugle. Sunday morning found the horseman at Gordon's Ferry on Duck River, 51 miles from Nashville.Then he rode 80 miles more to Colbert's Ferry on the Tennessee River before nightfall and there the Indians ferried him across. After a night's rest he started next morning for the Chickasaw agency, 120 miles farther on, camping out in the canebrakes if he failed to reach there before dark. At the Chickasaw agency he made his first exchange of horses.Next was the Choctaw agency, 200 miles distant, and 100 miles beyond that point lay Natchez, the gateway to the great Southwest.

As part of the "Great Awakening" movement that swept the country in the late 18th and early 19th centuries, the "spiritual development" along the Trace started from the Natchez end and moved northward. Several Methodist preachers began working a circuit along the Trace as early as 1800. By 1812 they claimed a membership of 1,067 white Americans and 267 African Americans. The Methodists were soon joined in Natchez by other Protestant denominations, including Baptist missionaries and Presbyterians.

The latter accompanied the migration of Scots-Irish and Scots into the frontier areas. Presbyterians and their frontier offshoot, the Cumberland Presbyterians, were the most active of the three denominations in this country. They claimed converts among Native Americans. The Presbyterians started working from the south; the Cumberland Presbyterians worked from the north, as they had migrated to Tennessee from Kentucky.

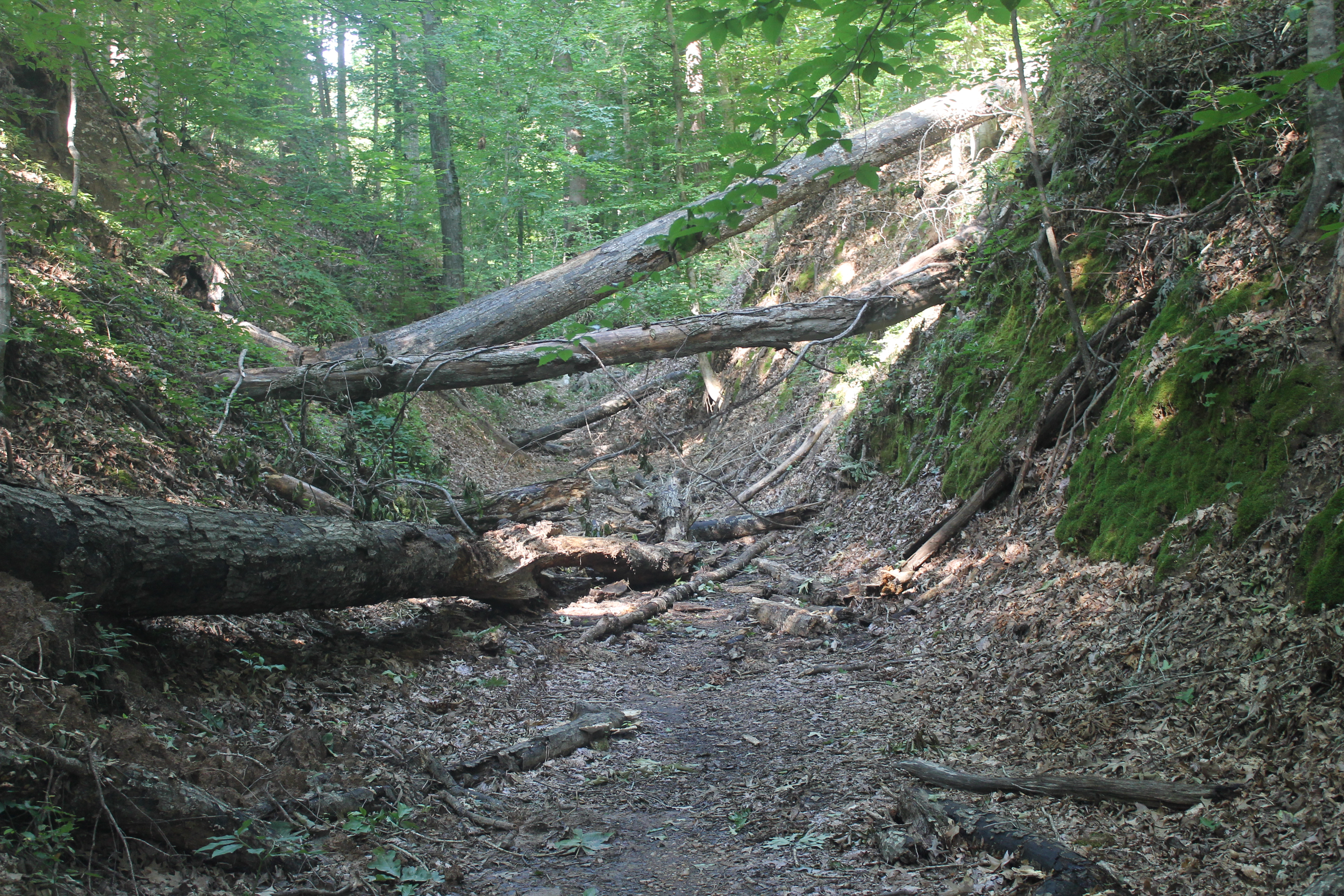
Another view of the Sunken Trace (June 2015)

As with the much-unsettled frontier, banditry regularly occurred along the Trace. Much of it centered around the river landing Natchez Under-The-Hill, as compared with the rest of the town atop the river bluff. Under-the-Hill, where barges and keelboats put in with goods from northern ports, was a hotbed of gamblers, prostitutes, and drunken crew from the boats. Many of the rowdies, referred to as "Kaintucks", were rough Kentucky frontiersmen who operated flatboats down the river. They delivered goods to Natchez in exchange for cash and sought gambling contests in Natchez Under-the-Hill. They walked or rode horseback the 450 miles back up the Trace to Nashville. In 1810, an estimated 10,000 "Kaintucks" used the Trace annually to return to the north to start another river journey.

Other dangers lurked on the Trace in the areas outside city boundaries. Highwaymen (such as John Murrell, Samuel Mason and the Harpe Brothers) terrorized travelers along the road. They operated large gangs of organized brigands in one of the first examples of land-based organized crime in the United States.

== Stands along the trace ==
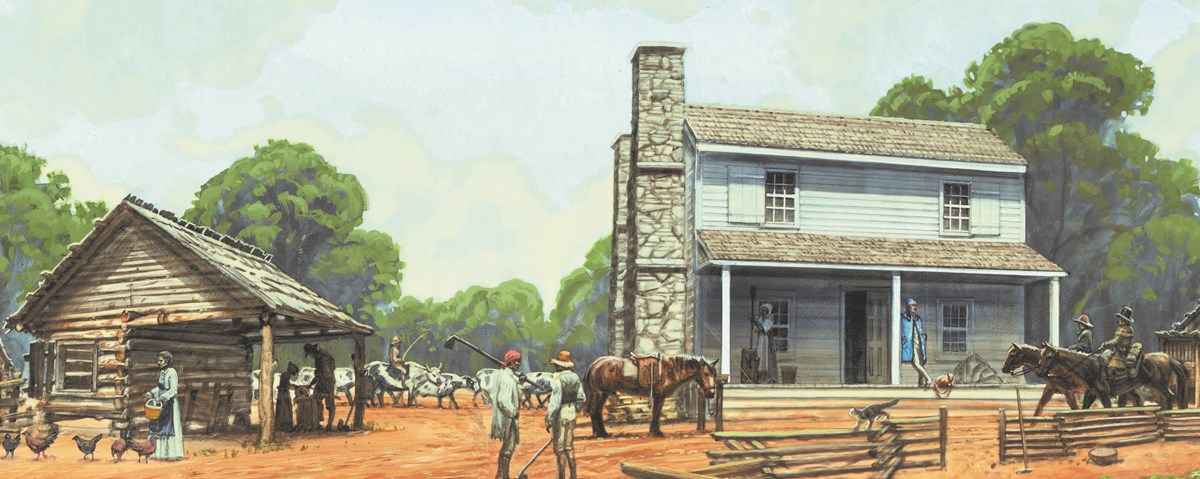
Buzzard Roost Stand

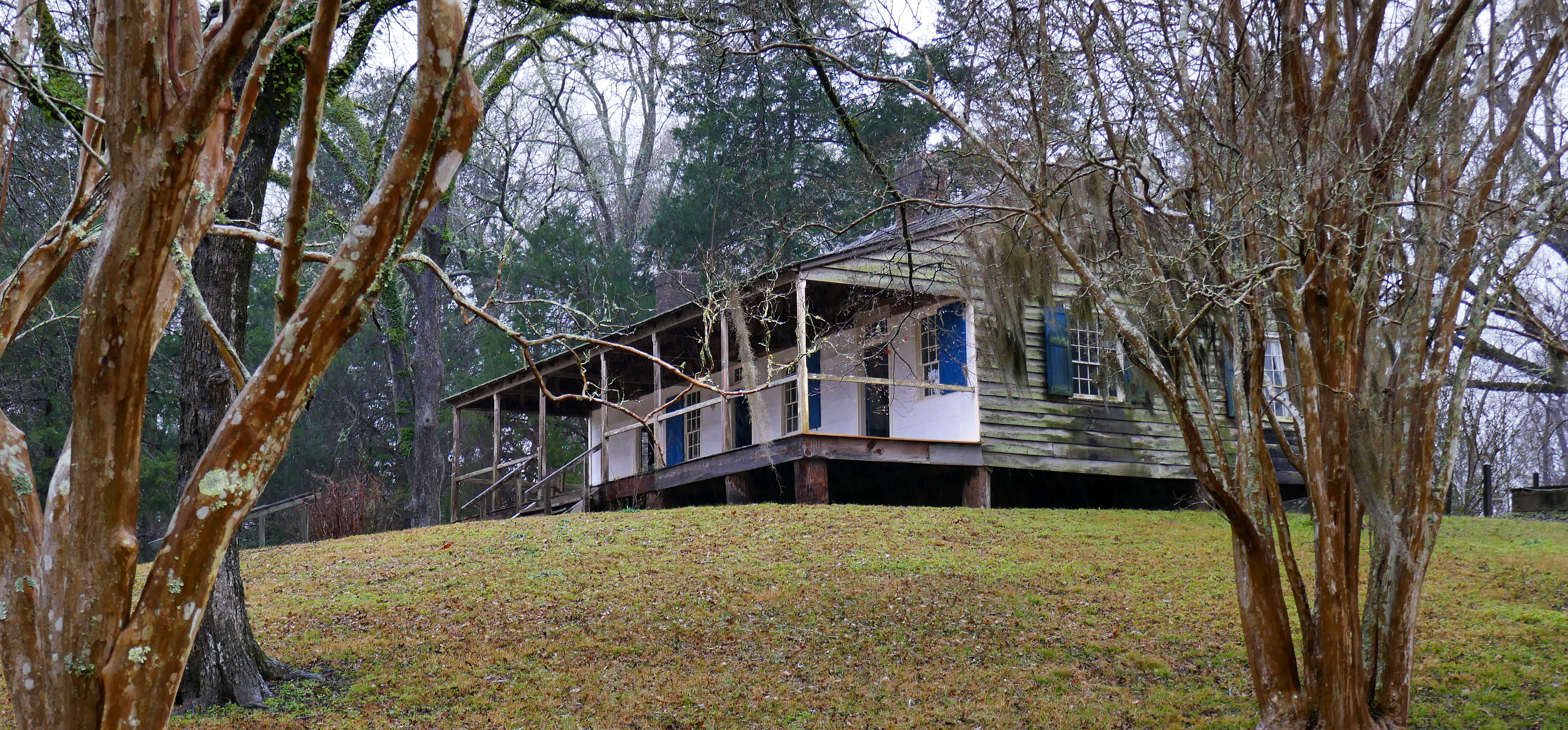
Mount Locust, a "stand", or inn, that served travelers the early 1800s. It's one of the oldest structures left on the Old Natchez Trace.

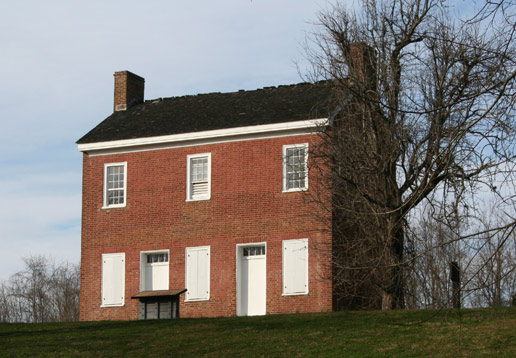
John Gordon House at Duck River

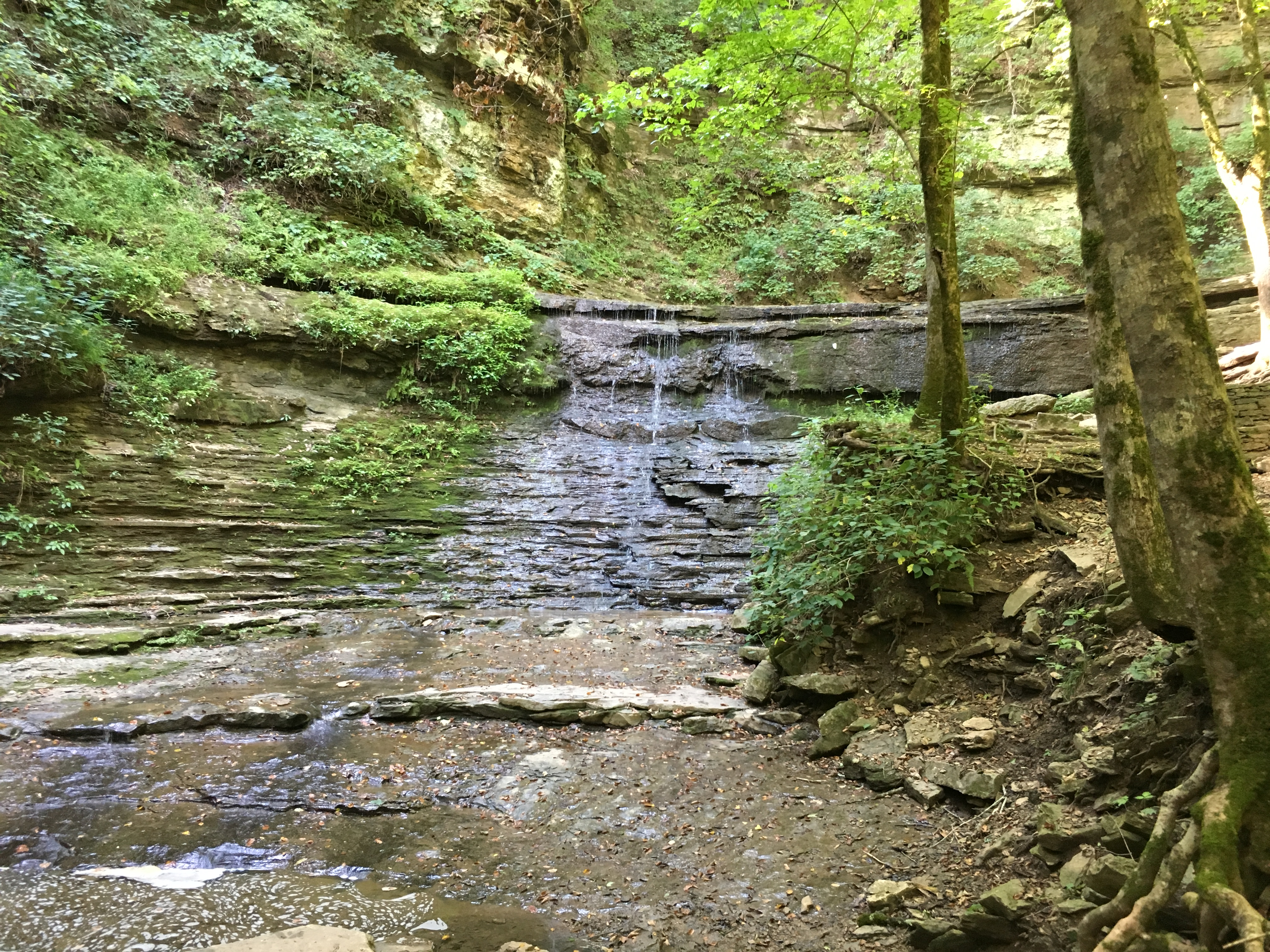
Jackson Falls, named for Andrew Jackson, is just off the Natchez Trace Parkway; Jackson Branch once fed into Duck River in Maury County, Tennessee

The inns, or stands, as they were called along the Natchez Trace, provided lodging for travelers from the 1790s to the 1840s. These stands furnished food and accommodations and contributed to the spread of news, information, and new ideas. The food was basic: corn in the form of hominy was a staple, and bacon, biscuits, coffee with sugar, and whiskey were served. Lodging was normally on the floor; beds were available only to a few due to many travelers and cramped conditions. Some travelers chose to sleep outdoors or on the porches.

Stands on the old Natchez Trace, from Nashville south to Natchez
Nashville

- Joslin's Stand, Tenn. 1797
- Gordon's Stand, with Gordon's Ferry across the Duck River, Tenn. 1802.
- Keg Springs Stand, Tenn. 1812
- Sheboss Place, Tenn.
- Dobbin's Stand, Tenn. 1808
- Grinder's Stand, Tenn. 1808
- McLish's Stand, Tenn. 1806
- Young Factor's Stand, Tenn. 1805
- McGlamery's Stand, Tenn.
- Toscomby's Stand, Tenn.1810
- George Colbert's Stand and Colbert's Ferry across the Tennessee River, Ala. 1806; present-day Florence

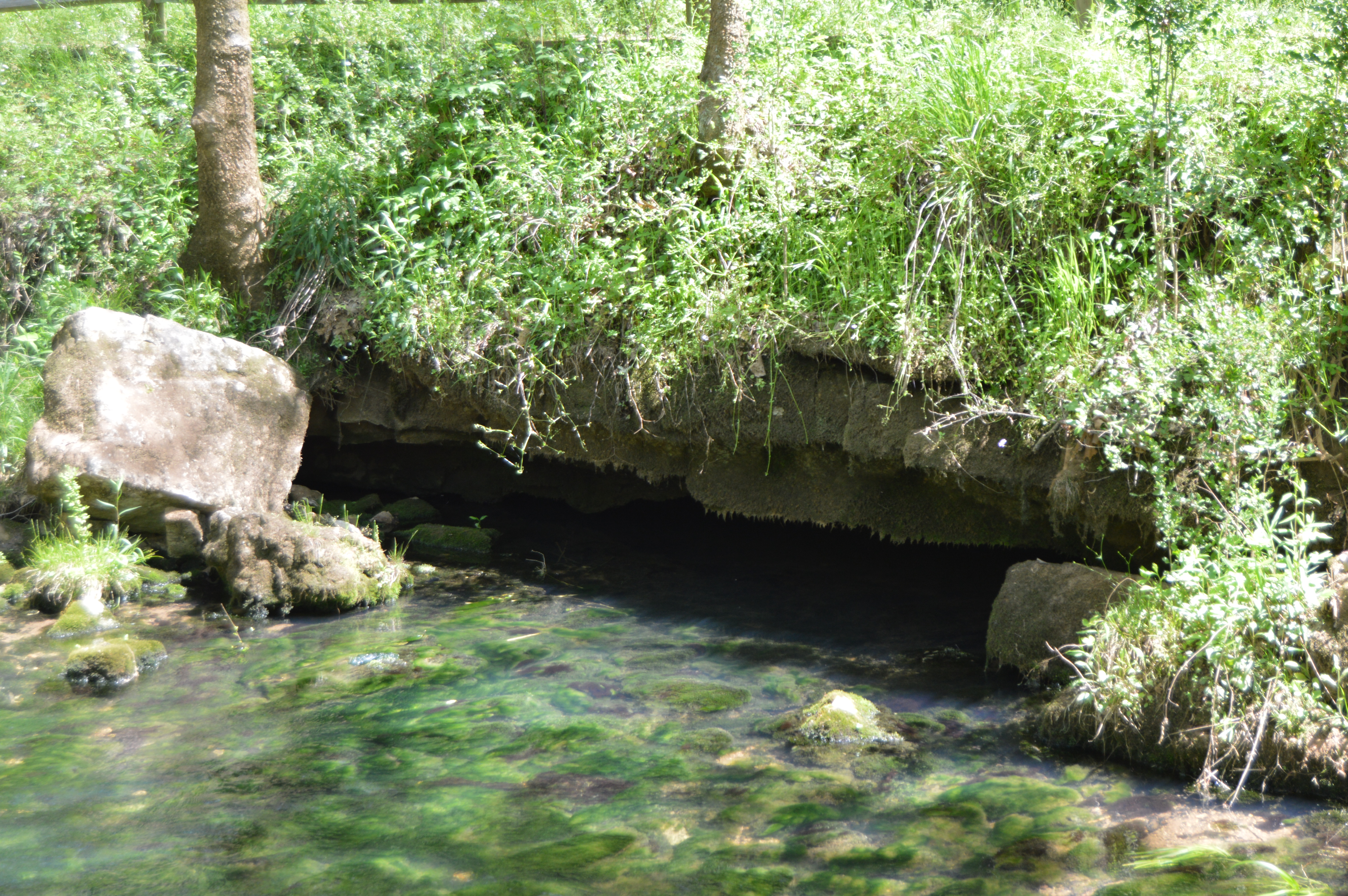
The spring located at Buzzard Roost Spring at Milepost 320.3 near Cherokee, Alabama.

- Buzzard Roost Stand, Ala. 1812 See:Levi Colbert
- Levi Colbert's Stand, Ala.
- Brown's Stand, Miss. 1815
- Old Factor's Stand, Miss. 1812
- Levi Kemp's Stand, Miss. 1825
- James Colbert's Stand, Miss. 1812

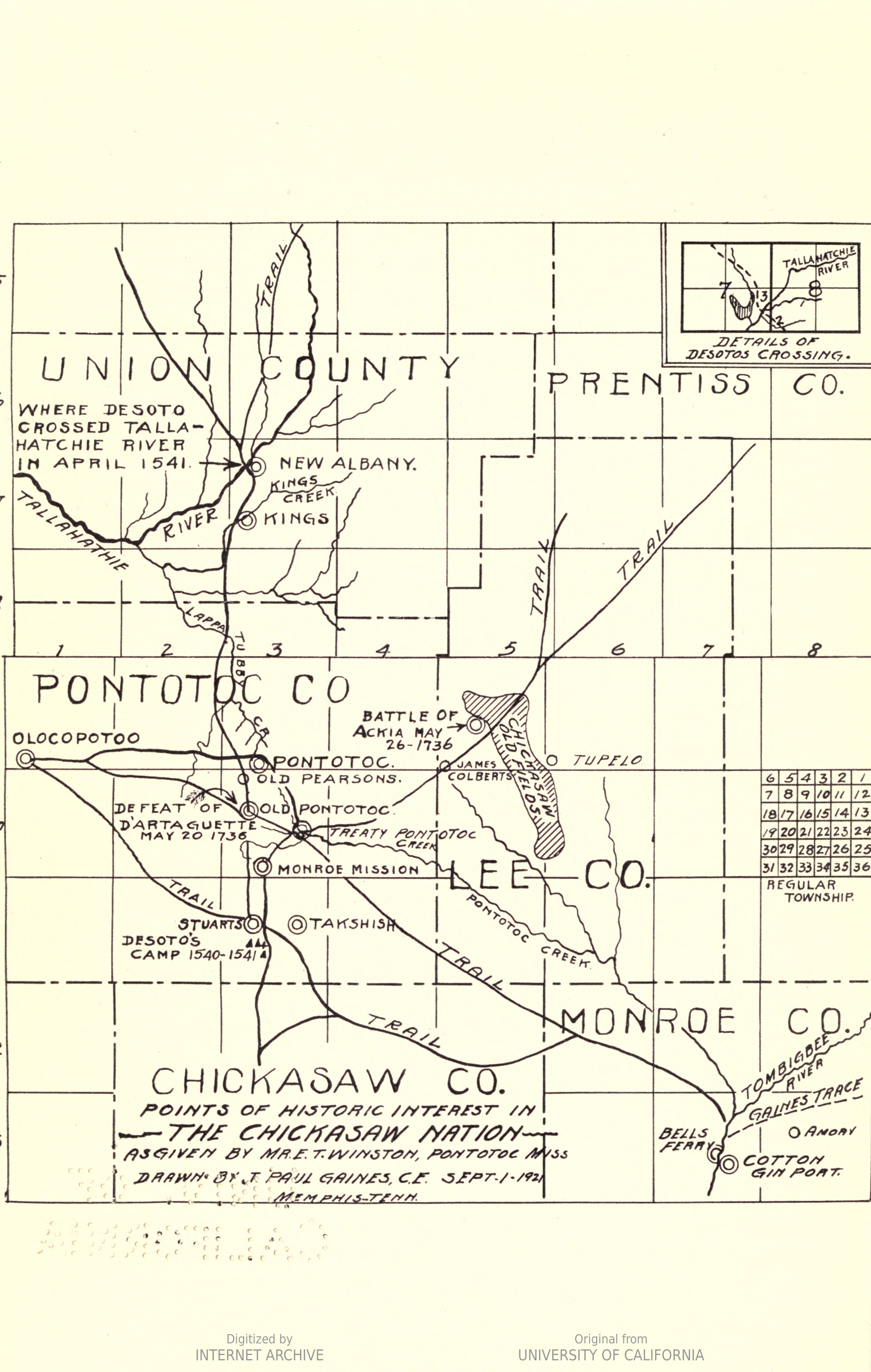
Points of historic interest in the Chickasaw Nation, Mississippi (drawn 1922)

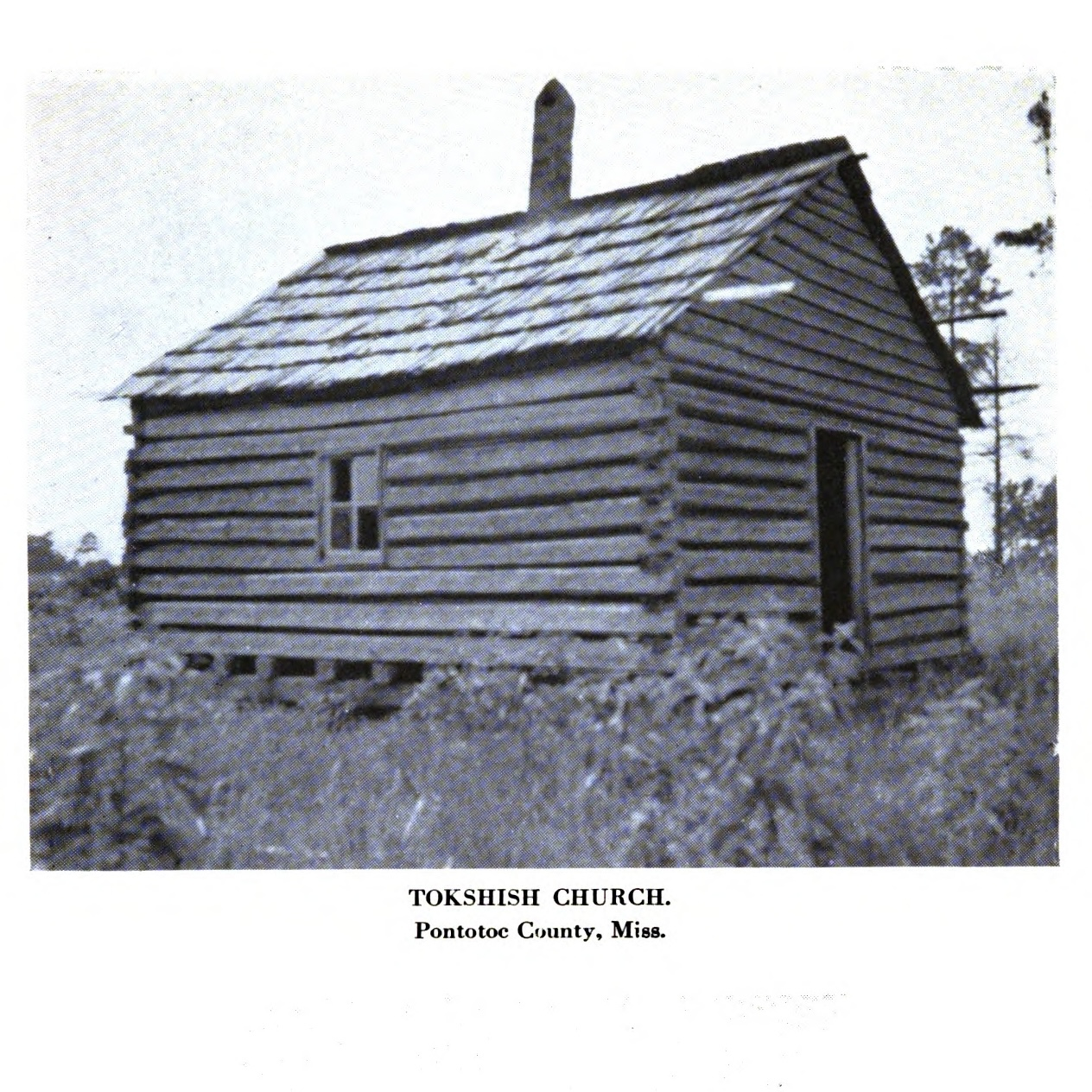
Tokshish Church, Pontotoc County, Mississippi

- Tockshish's Stand (McIntosh's Stand), or McIntoshville, Chickasaw Old Town, Miss. 1797
- Wall's Stand, Miss. 1811
- Pigeon Roost Stand, Miss. 1800
- Mitchell's Stand, Miss. 1806
- French Camp, LeFleur's Stand, Miss. 1810
- Hawkins's Stand, Harkin's Stand, Miss. 1811
- Shoat's Stand (Choteau's Stand), Miss. 1811
- Anderson's Stand, Miss.1811
- Crowders Stand, Miss. 1813
- Doak's Stand, Miss. 1810. See: Treaty of Doak's Stand.
- Ward's Stand, Miss. 1811
- Brashear's Stand, Miss. 1806. See: Ridgeland, Mississippi.

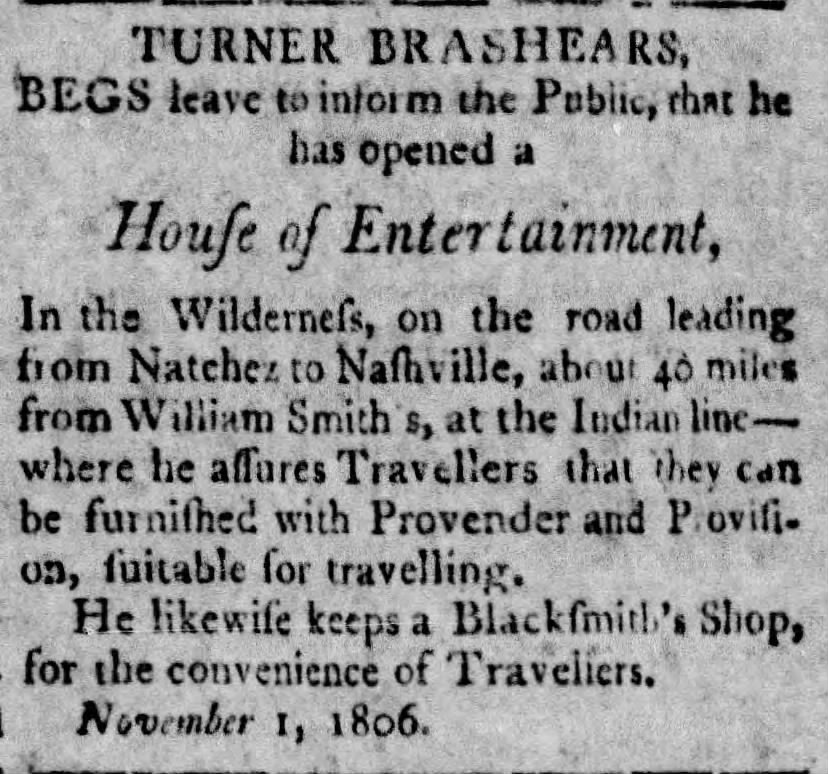
Turner Brashears announces his tavern is open for business, 1806

Jackson

- Ogburn's Stand, Miss. 1810
- Hayes's Stand, Miss. 1815
- Dean's Stand, Miss. 1821
- Red Bluff Stand, McRover's Stand, Smith's Stand, Miss. 1806

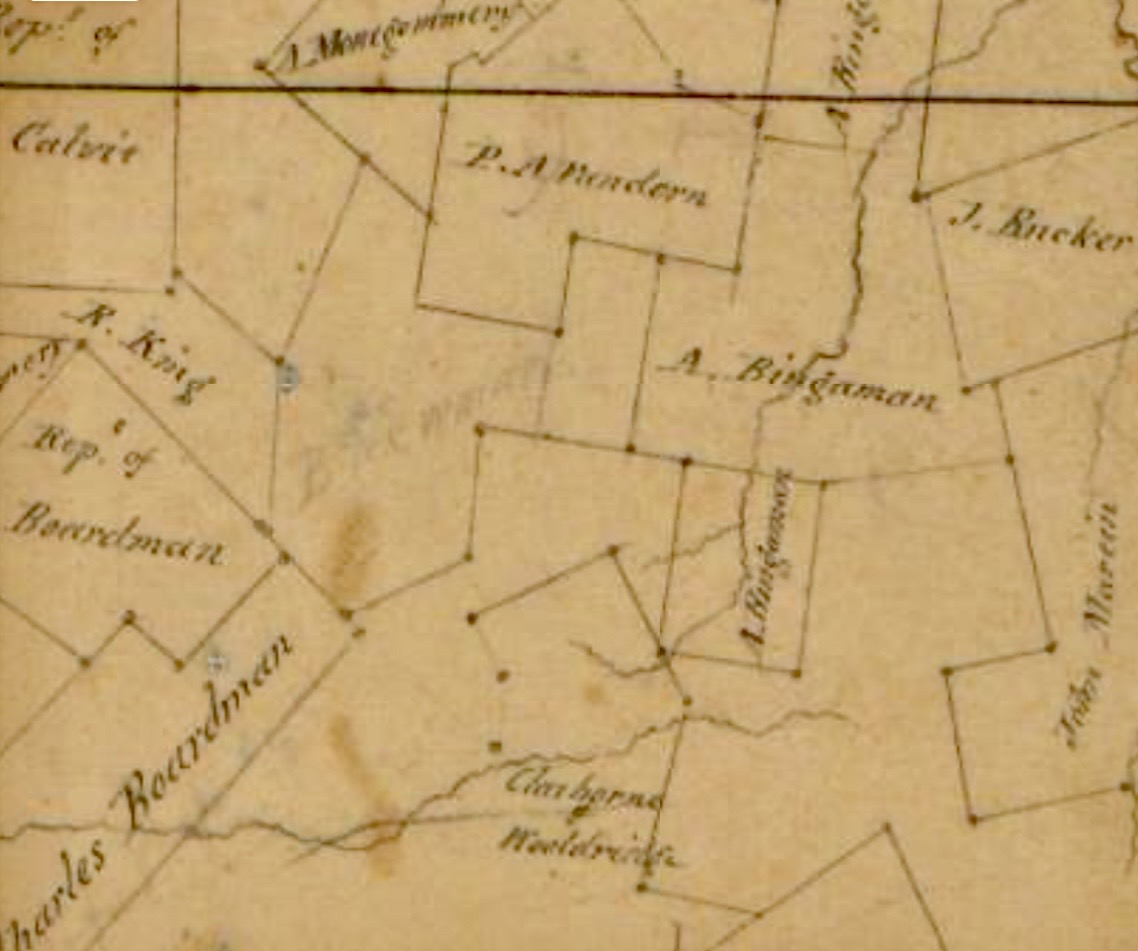
Store of Claiborne & Wooldridge, 1810

- Wooldridge's Stand, Miss. 1806
- Dillon's Stand, aft. 1830
- Grindstone Ford, Miss. 1797

Port Gibson

- Coon Box Stand, Miss.
- Old Greenville, Miss.
- Uniontown, Miss.
- Selserville, Miss.
- Washington, Miss.

Natchez

== Death of Meriwether Lewis ==
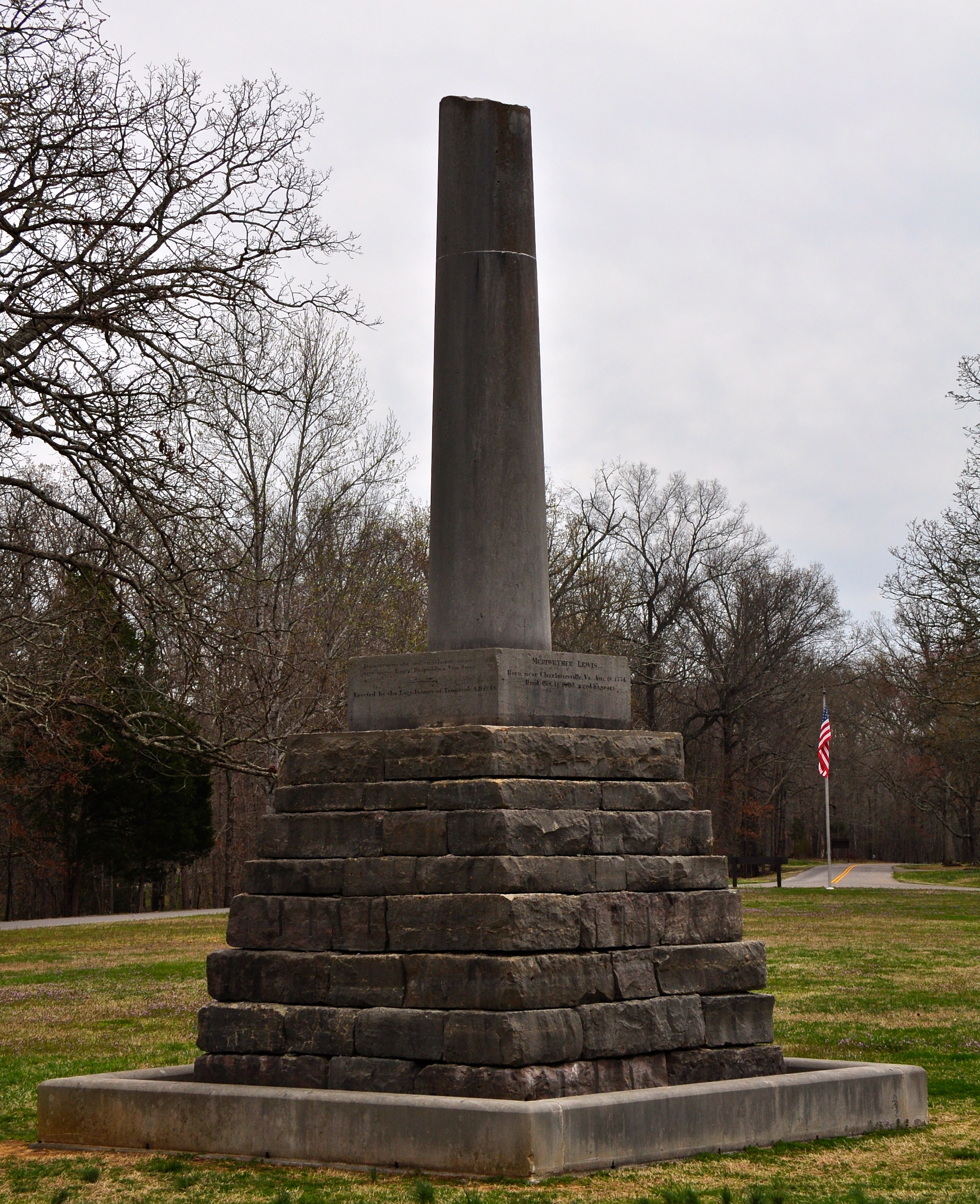
Meriwether Lewis National Monument and Grave, April 2014

Meriwether Lewis, of the Lewis and Clark Expedition fame, died while traveling on the Trace. Then serving as appointed governor of the Louisiana Territory, he was on his way to Washington, D.C., from his base in St. Louis, Missouri. Lewis stopped at Grinder's Stand (near current-day Hohenwald, Tennessee) for overnight shelter in October 1809. He was distraught over many issues, possibly affected by his use of opium. He was believed by many to have committed suicide there with a gun.

Some uncertainty persists as to whether it was suicide. His mother believed he had been murdered, and rumors circulated about possible killers. Thomas Jefferson and Lewis's former partner, William Clark, accepted the report of suicide. Lewis was buried near the inn along the Trace. In 1848, a Tennessee state commission erected a monument at the site.

On the bicentennial of Lewis's death (2009), the first national public memorial service honoring his life was held; it was also the last event of the Lewis and Clark Expedition Bicentennial.

== See also ==
- Natchez Trace State Park, Tennessee
- Trace State Park, Mississippi
