= List of burial mounds in the United States =

This is a list of notable burial mounds in the United States built by Native Americans. Burial mounds were built by many different cultural groups over a span of many thousands of years, beginning in the Late Archaic period and continuing through the Woodland period up to the time of European contact.

== Adena and Hopewell culture burial mounds ==
Mound	Location	Date	Culture	Notes
Bynum Mound and Village Site	Chickasaw County, Mississippi	100 BCE to 100 CE	Miller culture (part of the Hopewell tradition)	A Middle Woodland period archaeological site located near Houston, Mississippi. The complex of six conical shaped mounds was in use during the Miller 1 and Miller 2 phases of the Miller culture. and was built between 100 BCE and 100 CE. It was listed on the National Register of Historic Places in 1989 as part of the Natchez Trace Parkway at milepost 232.4.
Carl Potter Mound	Champaign County, Ohio	?	?	Also known as the "Hodge Mound II", it is located in southern Champaign County, Ohio, near Mechanicsburg, it lies on a small ridge in a pasture field in southeastern Union Township.
Conus	Marietta Earthworks, Marietta, Ohio	100 BCE to 500 CE	Adena culture	The conical Great Mound at Mound Cemetery is part of a mound complex known as the Marietta Earthworks, which includes the nearby Quadranaou and Capitolium platform mounds, the Sacra Via walled mounds (largely destroyed in 1882), and three enclosures.
Criel Mound	South Charleston, West Virginia	250 to 150 BCE	Adena culture	Located in South Charleston, West Virginia, the mound lies equidistant between two "sacred circles", earthwork enclosures each 556 feet (169 m) in diameter. It was originally 33 feet (10 m) high and 173 feet (53 m) in diameter at the base, making it the second-largest such burial mound in the state.
Crooks Mound	La Salle Parish, Louisiana	100 BCE to 400 CE	Early Marksville culture	A large Marksville culture mound site in La Salle Parish in south central Louisiana. It is a large conical mound that was part of at least six episodes of burials. It measured about 16 ft high (4.9 m) and 85 ft wide (26 m). It contained roughly 1,150 remains that were placed however they were able to be fit into the structure of the mound. Sometimes body parts were removed in order to achieve that goal. Archaeologists think it was a holding house for the area that was emptied periodically in order to achieve this type of setup.
Dunns Pond Mound	Logan County, Ohio	ca. 300 to 500 CE	Ohio Hopewell culture	Located in northwestern Ohio near Huntsville, it lies along the southeastern corner of Indian Lake in Washington Township. In 1974, the mound was listed on the National Register of Historic Places as a potential archeological site, with much of its significance deriving from its use as a burial site for as much as nine centuries.
Everett Knoll Complex	Summit County, Ohio	200 to 500 CE	Ohio Hopewell Culture	Located in Northeast Ohio within Cuyahoga Valley National Park. Several artifacts were found within a small mound with an unusual limestone crypt. Signs of habitation were discovered nearby.
Grave Creek Mound	Moundsville, West Virginia	250 to 150 BCE	Adena culture	At 69 feet (21 m) high and 295 feet (90 m) in diameter, the Grave Creek Mound is the largest conical type burial mound in the United States. In 1838, much of the archaeological evidence in this mound was destroyed when several non-archaeologists tunneled into the mound. To gain entrance to the mound, two shafts, one vertical and one horizontal, were created. This led to the most significant discovery of two burial vaults.
Grand Gulf Mound	Claiborne County, Mississippi	50 to 150 CE	Marksville culture	An Early Marksville culture site located near Port Gibson in Claiborne County, Mississippi, on a bluff 1 mile (1.6 km) east of the Mississippi River, 2 miles (3.2 km) north of the mouth of the Big Black River. The site has an extant burial mound, and may have possibly had two others in the past. The site is believed to have been occupied from 50 to 200 CE.
Indian Mounds Regional Park	Saint Paul, Minnesota	1 to 500 CE	Hopewell and Dakota cultures	Originally up to 37 mounds constructed, 6 still in existence
Miamisburg Mound	Miamisburg, Ohio	800 BCE to 100 CE	Adena culture	The largest conical mound in the state of Ohio, constructed by the Adena culture on a 100-foot-high bluff, the mound measures 877 feet (267 m) in circumference and its height is 65 feet (20 m).
Mound City	Chillicothe, Ohio	200 BCE to 500 CE	Ohio Hopewell culture	Located on Ohio Highway 104 approximately four miles north of Chillicothe along the Scioto River, it is a group of 23 earthen mounds. Each mound within the Mound City Group covered the remains of a charnel house. After the Hopewell people cremated the dead, they burned the charnel house. They constructed a mound over the remains. They also placed artifacts, such as copper figures, mica, arrowheads, shells and pipes in the mounds.
Mount Vernon Site	Posey County, Indiana	1 to 300 CE	Crab Orchard Culture	One of the largest known Hopewell mounds. Large quantities of artifacts, including intact cloth and leather ornaments, were found within it. Damaged and looted during discovery in 1988.
Pinson Mounds; Mounds 6, 12, and 31	Madison County, Tennessee	100 to 300 CE	Miller culture	A mound complex which includes mounds, a geometric enclosure and numerous habitation areas, it is the largest group of Middle Woodland mounds in the United States. The complex covers approximately 400 acres (1.6 km^{2}) and contains at least 30 mounds, 17 of which have been identified as being completely or partially constructed by prehistoric peoples. It includes at least 3 burial mounds, and a number of ceremonial platform mounds.
Reservoir Stone Mound	Licking County, Ohio	85 to 135 CE	Probably Adena culture	Also known as the Jacksontown Stone Mound, the central, stone-covered structure was largely destroyed by the removal of stones to construct the Licking Reservoir and by a 19th-century treasure-hunter. Around the edge of the large stone mound were a number of earthen mounds, some of which contained burials.

== Mississippian culture burial mounds ==
Mound	Location	Date	Culture	Notes
Cahokia Mound 72	Mound 72, Cahokia; Collinsville, Illinois	650 to 1400 CE	Middle Mississippian culture	A ridge-top burial mound south of Monk's Mound; during excavations archaeologists found the remains of a man in his 40s who was probably an important Cahokian ruler. Archaeologists recovered more than 250 other skeletons from Mound 72. Scholars believe almost 62 percent of these were sacrificial victims, based on signs of ritual execution, method of burial, and other factors.
Castalian Springs Mound 2	Castalian Springs Mound Site in Sumner County, Tennessee	1100 to 1450 CE	Middle Mississippian culture	Located on the eastern edge of a plaza, a 120 feet (37 m) in diameter 8 feet (2.4 m) tall mound was found to contain over a hundred burials when excavated by William E. Myer in the early 1890s.
Craig Mound	Spiro Mounds, Le Flore County, Oklahoma	800–1200 CE	Caddoan Mississippian culture	Also called the "Great Mortuary", it is the second-largest mound on the site and the only burial mound. A hollow chamber that began as a burial structure for Spiro's rulers became a cavity within the mound, about 10 feet (3.0 m) high and 15 feet (4.6 m) wide, and allowed for almost perfect preservation of fragile artifacts made of wood, conch shell, and copper. The conditions in this hollow space were so favorable that objects made of perishable materials such as basketry, woven fabric, lace, fur, and feathers were preserved inside it. Craig Mound has been called "an American King Tut's Tomb".
George C. Davis Mound C	Caddoan Mounds State Historic Site, Cherokee County, Texas	800–1200 CE	Caddoan Mississippian culture	Mound C, the northernmost mound of the three at the site, it was used as a ceremonial burial mound, not for elite residences or temples like the other two. The site was the southwesternmost ceremonial mound center of all the mound building cultures of North America.
Etowah Mound C	Etowah Indian Mounds, Cartersville, Georgia	1000-1550 CE	South Appalachian Mississippian	Cyrus Thomas and John P. Rogan tested the site for the Smithsonian Institution in 1883, where they discovered the "Rogan plates". But, the first well-documented archaeological inquiry at the site did not begin until the winter of 1925, conducted by Warren K. Moorehead. His excavations into Mound C at the site revealed a rich array of burial goods. These artifacts, along with the collections from Cahokia, Moundville, Lake Jackson, and Spiro Mounds, would comprise the majority of the materials which archeologists used to define the Southeastern Ceremonial Complex.
Fatherland Site Mound C	Grand Village of the Natchez, Natchez, Mississippi	1400-1732 CE	Plaquemine Mississippian culture	Mound C was used as the Sun Temple and charnel house for the Natchez elite.
Gahagan Mound B	Gahagan Mounds Site, Red River Parish, Louisiana	1100–1450 CE	Caddoan Mississippian culture	The burial mound at the site was excavated twice, in 1912 by Clarence Bloomfield Moore and then in 1939 by Clarence H. Webb. Between the two excavations, three burial shafts with a total of fourteen burials and more than five hundred grave goods were discovered. The first shaft, found by Moore, was 11 feet in depth and 13 by 8 feet in width and height. The other two, found in the 1939 excavations, were 19 feet (5.8 m) by 15 feet (4.6 m) and 12 feet (3.7 m) by 11 feet (3.4 m) feet in dimensions. Grave goods found included flaked flint knives known as Gahagan blades, a matched pair of long-nosed god maskette earrings of copper, Missouri flint clay statues, greenstone celts and spuds, and caches of beads and arrow heads. Many of the grave goods were exotic imports from distant places from across the continent.
High Cliff State Park Effigy Mounds	Calumet County, Wisconsin	1000 to 1500 CE	Dakota cultures	Effigy mounds built by nomadic woodland tribes somewhere between 1000 CE and 1500 CE. These dates have been determined by carbon dating charcoal remnants from the fires of the effigy mound builders. The woodland tribes that built these mounds are thought to be Siouan origin which was later replaced by Dakota, Winnebago, Menominee, Salk, Fox and other tribes. Out of the original 30 effigy mounds in High Cliff, only nine remain.
Mangum Mound	Mangum Mound Site, Claiborne County, Mississippi	1350 to 1500 CE	Plaquemine Mississippian culture	Located at milepost 45.7 on the Natchez Trace Parkway. Various pottery fragments belonging to the Plaquemine culture, chunkey stones and several Mississippian copper plates, one with an avian design similar to other plates found at Etowah in Georgia and Lake Jackson mounds in Florida. These portray the Birdman motif important to the Southeastern Ceremonial Complex (S.E.C.C.).
Nacoochee Mound	Nacoochee Mound, White County, Georgia	1350–1600 CE	South Appalachian Mississippian culture	Nacoochee Mound, on the banks of the Chattahoochee River in White County, in the northeast part of the U.S. state of Georgia. Today Georgia Georgia State Route 17 and Georgia State Route 75 intersect near here. First occupied as early as 100–500 CE, the site was later developed and occupied more intensively from 1350 to 1600 CE by peoples of the South Appalachian Mississippian culture (a regional variation of the Mississippian culture). One of their characteristic platform mounds is located at the site. A professional archeological excavation revealed a total of 75 human burials, with artifacts that support dating of the site.
Nodena site Mound C	Nodena site, Mississippi County, Arkansas	1400–1650 CE	Middle Mississippian culture	A circular mound, designated as "Mound C", was located at the other end of the chunkey field. It was roughly 93 feet (28 m) in diameter and 3 feet (0.91 m) high. Numerous graves of males, 314 of 316 total, were found buried under it.
Pocahontas Mounds	Pocahontas Mounds, Hinds County, Mississippi		Coles Creek and Plaquemine Mississippian cultures	
Pope County Mound 2	Kincaid site, Pope County, Illinois	1050–1400 CE	Middle Mississippian culture	Adjacent to the Ohio River, the site straddles the modern-day counties of Massac and Pope in deep southern Illinois, an area colloquially known as Little Egypt. On the eastern edge of the site is a low circular mound which was used as a burial mound. All other mounds at the site were substructure platform mounds. The mound contained a number of stone box graves and log-lined tombs similar to those frequently found to the south in the Middle Cumberland Valley of Tennessee.
Shiloh Mound C	Shiloh Indian Mounds, Hardin County, Tennessee	1000–1450 CE	Middle Mississippian culture	Adjacent to the Tennessee River, the site has 6 or 7 substructure platform mounds and one burial mound, Mound C. This mound was excavated in 1899 by Cornelius Cadle, chairman of the Shiloh Park Commission. Among the discoveries was a large stone effigy pipe in the shape of a kneeling man. It has since become the site's most famous artifact and is on display in the Tennessee River Museum in Savannah. The pipe is from a distinctive red stone in the same style as several statuettes from the major Cahokia site in Collinsville, Illinois.

== See also ==
- List of Adena culture sites
- List of Hopewell sites
- List of Mississippian sites
- List of the oldest buildings in the United States
- Basket Creek Cemetery, an example of late 19th-century African American burial mounds
