= Charles F. Bohannon =

American archaeologist (1935–2011)

Charles F. Bohannon (August 18, 1935 – March 10, 2011) was an American archaeologist for the National Park Service. In 1962 he excavated the Mineral Springs Site in Arkansas. In 1963 he excavated the Mangum Mound Site, which included the discovery of a rare repoussé copper plate. In 1965 he excavated the Bear Creek Site and Cave Springs Site along the Natchez Trace Parkway. In 1966 he supervised excavations at the Pharr Mounds. Bohannon argued in favor of the reconstruction of some historic buildings, on site, stating that, "there are instances where reconstructions are desirable and justifiable." Regarding historical integrity, Bohannon stated, "some properties have more than others, but only rarely could one state that a well reconstructed site possesses it or lacks it totally."
