= Natchez Trace Trail =

Scenic trail in the United States

Coordinates: 34°40′3.81″N 88°5′17.93″W

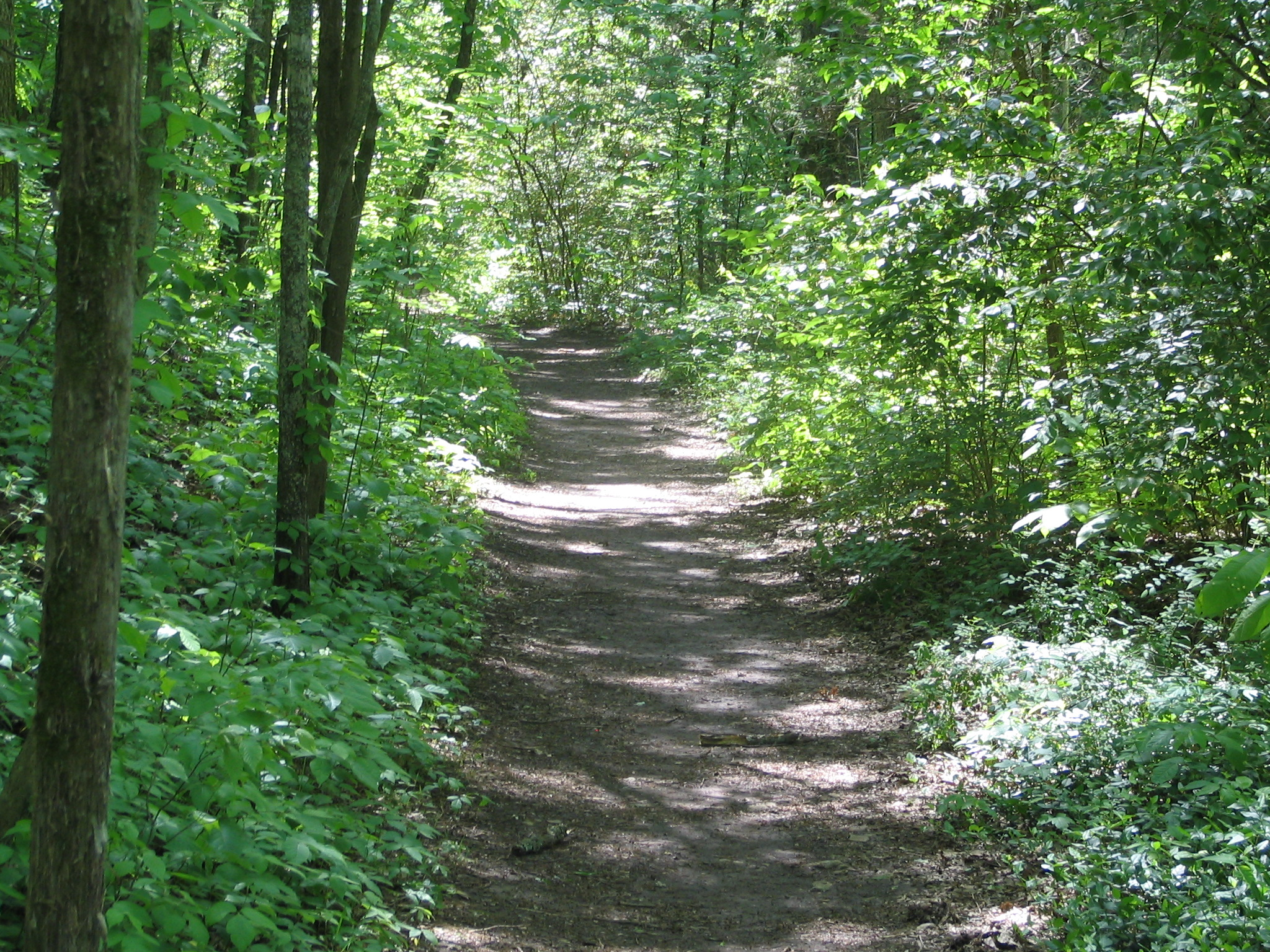
- Natchez Trace Trail in Warner Park, Nashville, Tennessee.
- Length: over 60 miles with 5 segments
- Location: Alabama, Mississippi, and Tennessee in the United States
- Designation: National Scenic Trail in 1983
- Use: Hiking, Horseback riding
- Sights: ghost town of Rocky Springs; Ross Barnett Reservoir
- Surface: soil
- Website: Natchez Trace National Scenic Trail

The Natchez Trace Trail is a designated National Scenic Trail in the United States, whose route generally follows sections of the 444-mile (715 km) Natchez Trace Parkway through the states of Tennessee, Alabama, and Mississippi. The Natchez Trace Trail is not a long, continuous footpath, as is the case with other national scenic trails (such as the Appalachian Trail); rather, only a limited number of trail segments along the route, currently over 60 miles (97 km) of trail, have been developed for hiking and horseback riding. Moreover, the Natchez Trace Trail, unlike many others that rely heavily on volunteers for trail construction and maintenance, is managed and maintained by the National Park Service. Sections of the trail follow along the Natchez Trace Parkway road shoulder, and cross county and state roads. It was originally intended to be longer and follow most of the Natchez Trace Parkway, but only a portion was built.

The Natchez Trace Parkway and National Scenic Trail commemorate the historic Natchez Trace, an ancient path that began as a wildlife and Native American trail, and has a rich history of use by colonizers, "Kaintuck" boatmen, post riders, and military men.

== Sections ==
This trail comprises five sections. The table below is ordered from South, Milepost 0 (Natchez) to North, Milepost 444 (near Nashville), but can be sorted differently.

Section Name	South Milepost	North Milepost	Notes
Potkopinu	17	20	As of 19 April 2012, this trail undergoing improvement and stream crossing may range from muddy to knee deep water.
Rocky Springs Trail	52.4	59	visitors can see the ghost town of Rocky Springs, Mississippi
Yockanookany Trail	107.9	130	immediately north of Jackson, Mississippi, longest trail section, 8 miles (13 km) of the trail section parallels the Ross Barnett Reservoir
Blackland Prairie Trail	260	266	in Tupelo, Mississippi
Highland Rim	407.9	427.4	between Highway 50 just north of the Duck River to the Garrison Creek trailhead south of Highway 46
