= Pharr Mounds =

- U.S. National Register of Historic Places
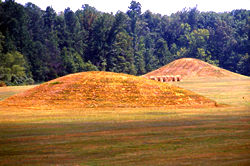
- Two mounds at the Pharr Mounds site

- Location within Mississippi
- Nearest city: Tupelo, Mississippi
- Coordinates: 34°27′59.3562″N 88°25′0.1734″W
- NRHP reference No.: 78000346
- Added to NRHP: February 23, 1978

Pharr Mounds is a Middle Woodland period archaeological site located near Tupelo in parts of Itawamba and Prentiss counties in northern Mississippi. This complex was made of earthwork mounds.

The complex of eight dome-shaped, tumulus burial mounds was in use during the Miller 1 phase of the Miller culture. These were constructed as earthwork mounds between 1 and 200 CE. The complex is considered to be one of the largest and most important sites from this era. It was listed on the National Register of Historic Places in 1978 as part of the Natchez Trace Parkway at milepost 286.7.

== Site description ==
The site is located at the headwaters of the Tombigbee River, a rugged, hilly area with many broad, swampy streams. It is named for "Pharr Flats", a wide, gently rolling terrace overlooking the confluence of Little Brown and Mackeys creeks. The site features eight dome-shaped mounds of differing sizes, several of which have been nearly flattened by plowing and cultivation during European-American farming. The mounds in the Pharr Mounds site are found over an area of 90 acres of land.

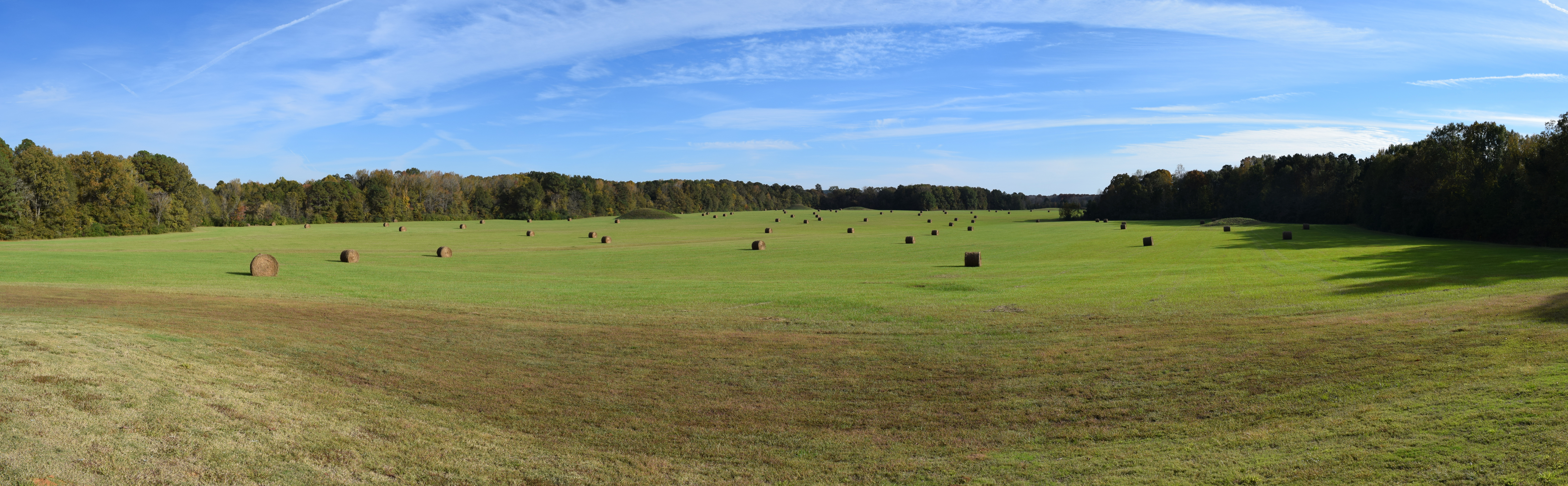
Pharr Mounds site

Mound	Width and length	Height
Mound A	55 feet (17 m) by 65 feet (20 m)	7 feet (2.1 m)
Mound B	105 feet (32 m) by 110 feet (34 m)	18 feet (5.5 m)
Mound C	115 feet (35 m) in diameter	18 feet (5.5 m)
Mound D	80 feet (24 m) by 95 feet (29 m)	12 feet (3.7 m)
Mound E	165 feet (50 m) by 175 feet (53 m)	8 feet (2.4 m)
Mound F	60 feet (18 m) in diameter	8 feet (2.4 m)
Mound G	200 feet (61 m) in diameter	6 feet (1.8 m)
Mound H	110 feet (34 m) by 130 feet (40 m)	2 feet (0.61 m)

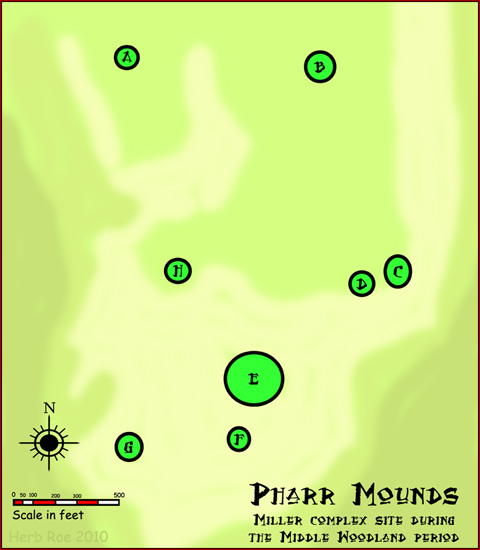
Diagram of Pharr Mounds

== Archaeology ==
In 1966 Charles Bohannon, an archaeologist for the National Park Service, supervised an excavation of four of the mounds. The excavators found fire pits and low clay platforms at the base of the mounds. They also found human remains, some cremated, as well as various ceremonial artifacts.

Many of the artifacts were made from non-local materials, such as Great Lakes copper and greenstone, galena, and mica, demonstrating the reach of trading through the Hopewell exchange system. These artifacts, which include copper ear-spools and a greenstone platform pipe, show the connection of the local peoples with the larger Middle Woodland period world of the time, reaching to the Great Lakes.

== See also ==
- Bynum Mound and Village Site
- Grand Gulf Mound
- Woodland period
