= Marksville Prehistoric Indian Site =

Archaeological site near Marksville, Avoyelles Parish, Louisiana

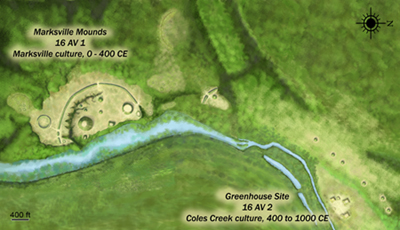
- Artists conception of the site layout.

- Location in Louisiana today
- 31°7′29″N 92°2′52″W
- Cultures: Marksville culture, Avoyel and Natchez peoples
- Location: Marksville, Louisiana, Avoyelles Parish, Louisiana, USA
- Region: Avoyelles Parish, Louisiana

Site notes
- Management: Municipal
- Marksville Prehistoric Indian Site
- U.S. National Register of Historic Places
- U.S. National Historic Landmark
- NRHP reference No.: 66000372

Significant dates
- Added to NRHP: October 15, 1966
- Designated NHL: July 19, 1964

Marksville Prehistoric Indian Site, also known as the Marksville site, (16 AV 1) is a Marksville culture archaeological site located 1 mile (1.6 km) southeast of Marksville in Avoyelles Parish, Louisiana. The site features numerous earthworks built by the prehistoric indigenous peoples of southeastern North America.

== Description ==
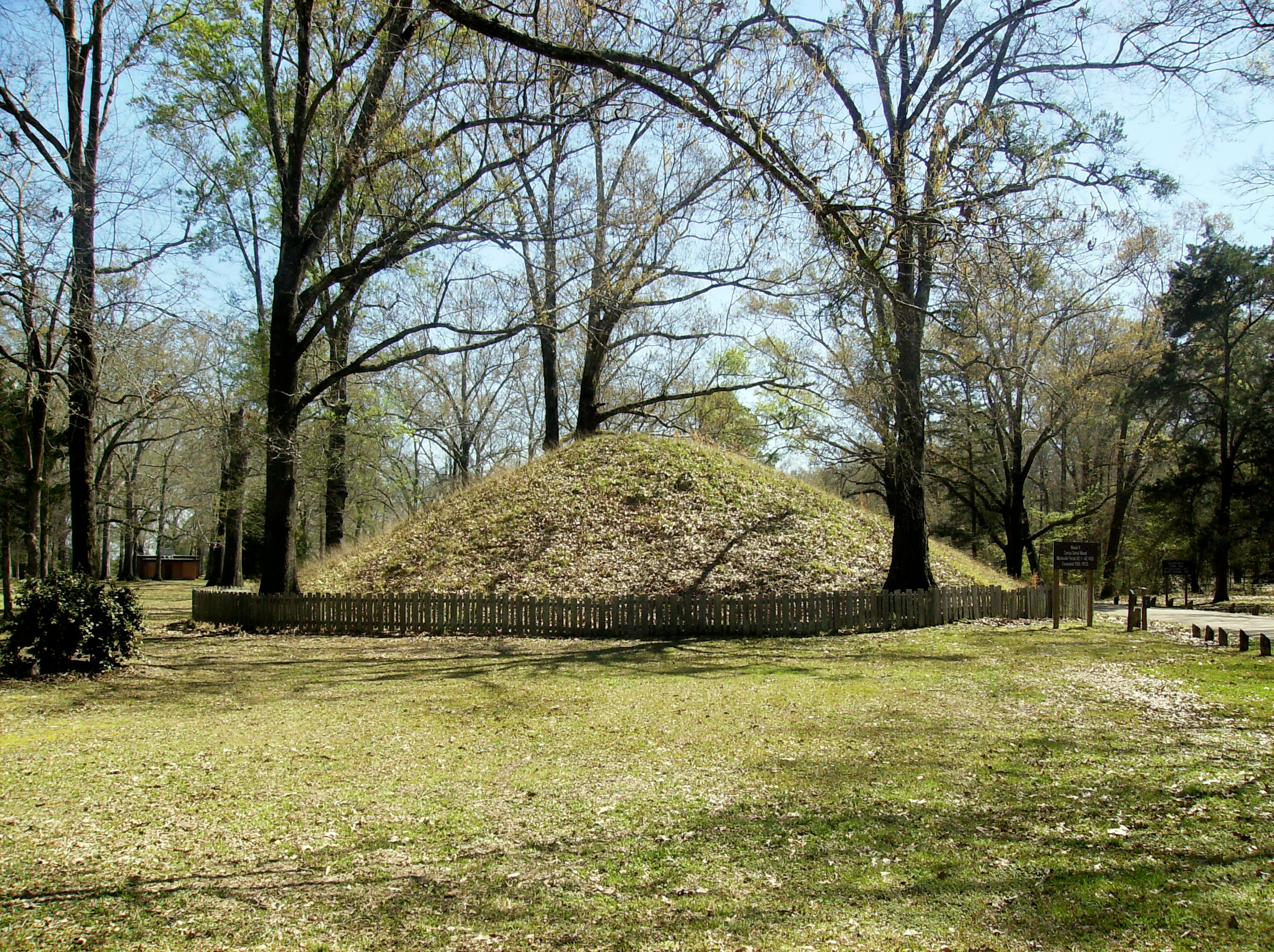
Burial mound at the site

Marksville is the type site for the Marksville culture (a local variation of the Hopewell tradition) and was the first scientifically excavated site for the culture. Centuries later the Avoyel and Natchez peoples lived in the vicinity of the site until 1700. Burial mounds at the site are surrounded by a horseshoe-shaped earthen embankment about 3,000 feet (910 m) long. The site is also one of the largest of the period in the southeastern United States, with large and distinctive ring features not found elsewhere. The site's importance has been known since the 1920s, when it was first formally investigated, and it is regularly the subject of further investigation. Radiometric dating of the sites features have yielded occupancy dates from 0-400 AD.

=== Landmark and access ===
The archaeological site was declared a National Historic Landmark in 1964.

The site was formerly operated by the State of Louisiana as a Louisiana State Park, however, in August 2020, the ownership and operations of the site transferred to the City of Marksville. As of November 2021, the site is closed to public access.

== See also ==
- Crooks mound
- Grand Gulf Mound
- List of Hopewell sites
- List of National Historic Landmarks in Louisiana
- National Register of Historic Places listings in Avoyelles Parish, Louisiana
