= Pigeon Roost, Mississippi =

Pigeon Roost
- Ghost town
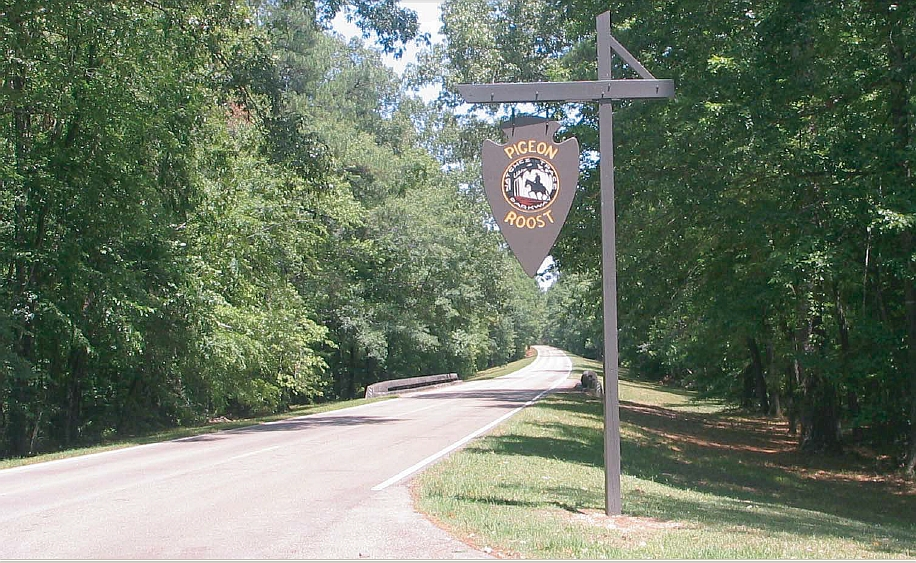
- Marker on Natchez Trace Parkway

- Location within the state of Mississippi
- Coordinates: 33°31′17″N 89°08′54″W
- Country: United States
- State: Mississippi
- County: Choctaw
- Elevation: 420 ft (128 m)
- Time zone: UTC-6 (Central (CST))
  - Summer (DST): UTC-5 (CDT)
- GNIS feature ID: 685865

Pigeon Roost is a ghost town in Choctaw County, Mississippi.

Once home to a Chief of the Choctaw people, and an important stop along the Old Natchez Road, nothing remains of the former settlement.

== History ==
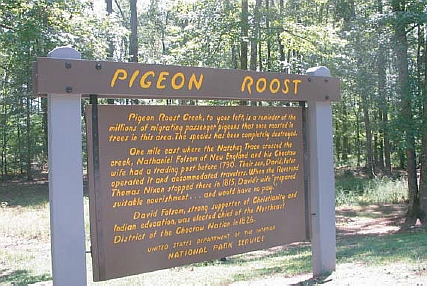
Marker on Natchez Trace Parkway

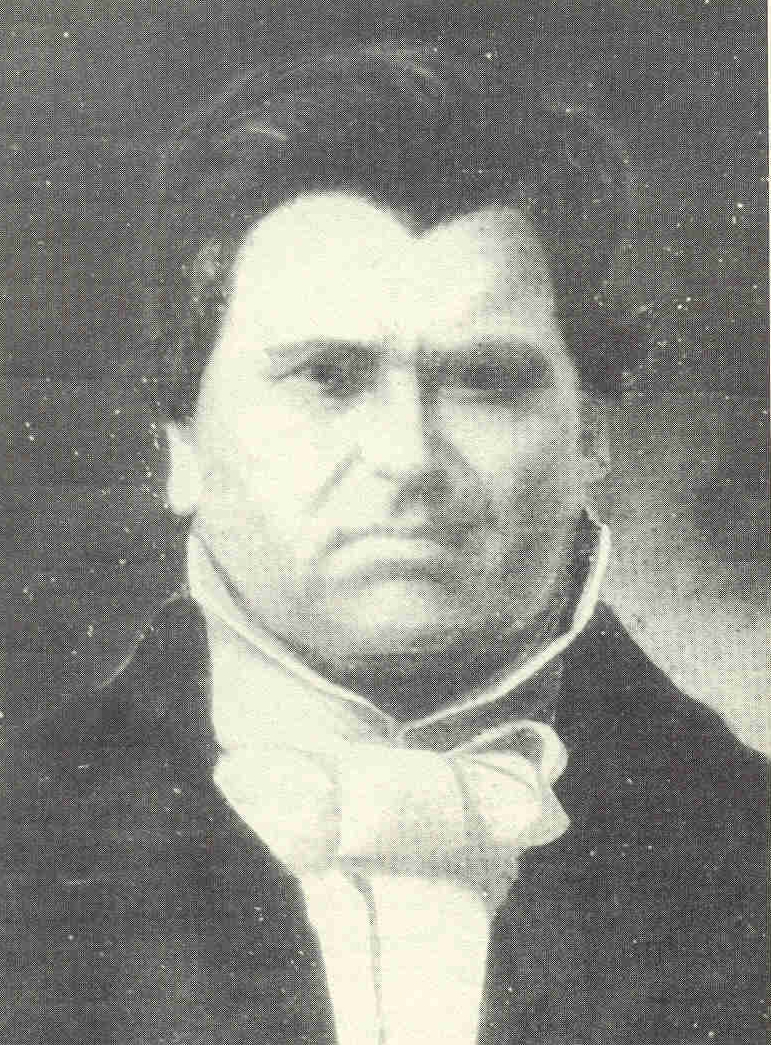
David Folsom

Pigeon Roost was located along the Old Natchez Road where it crossed the Big Black River.

The settlement was named for the millions of passenger pigeons that once roosted there.

Nathaniel Folsom of New England moved there in 1790, and opened "Folsom's Stand and Trading Post", within the Choctaw territory. Pigeon Roost became part of the Natchez-Nashville Mail Route in 1821, which passed "from Nashville to Florence, thence to Columbus, from there to Pigeon Roost, thence to Natchez".

Nathaniel married a Choctaw woman named Ai-ni-chi-ho-yo ("one to be preferred above others"), who was a direct descendant of a long line of Choctaw chiefs. Their son, David Folsom, assisted with the operation of the trading post, and was notable for his many accomplishments.

David Folsom assisted the Americans in the Seminole Wars in Florida, and became a colonel. David also enabled the first wagons to travel from the Tombigbee River in eastern Mississippi, to the navigable waters of the Yazoo River in the Mississippi Delta, by assisting early missionaries clear a wagon road from Pigeon Roost their mission at Elliott. David became influential within the Choctaw people, and met with Chief Mushulatubbee at Pigeon Roost in 1822. Noted Christian missionary Cyrus Byington lived with David Folsom in Pigeon Roost in 1823, where David—a strong believer in Christianity—taught Byington the Choctaw language. In 1826, David Folsom was named Chief of the Choctaw Nation in its northern district.

By the late 1820s, a school for Choctaw children was located at Pigeon Roost, and the community became central to many of the affairs of the Choctaw people. Pigeon Roost Cemetery was also located there.

A post office operated under the name Pigeon Roost from 1842 to 1871.

In 1830, Pigeon Roost ceased to exist following the Treaty of Dancing Rabbit Creek, which forced the removed of the Choctaw people from Mississippi.

A marker located at mile 203.5 on the Natchez Trace Parkway near Pigeon Roost Creek recognizes the former community.
