= Bynum Mound and Village Site =

Historic place in Mississippi, United States

- U.S. National Register of Historic Places
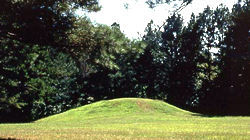
- A mound at Bynum

- Location within Mississippi Location within the United States
- Nearest city: Houston, Mississippi
- Coordinates: 33°53′52.6554″N 88°56′46.6794″W
- NRHP reference No.: 89000783
- Added to NRHP: July 16, 1989

The Bynum Mound and Village Site (22CS501) is a Middle Woodland period archaeological site located near Houston in Chickasaw County, Mississippi. The complex of six burial mounds was in use during the Miller 1 and Miller 2 phases of the Miller culture and was built between 100 BC and 100 AD. It was listed on the National Register of Historic Places in 1989 as part of the Natchez Trace Parkway at milepost 232.4.

== Site description ==
The 6 hectares (15 acres) site is located on a low ridge which overlooks Houlka Creek in the Tombigbee River drainage area. It has six conical burial mounds, which range in height from 5 feet (1.5 m) to 14 feet (4.3 m), and its associated habitation area were constructed and used during the Middle Woodland period, between 100 BC and 100 AD. In the 1940s, archaeologists with the National Park Service excavated five of the mounds. The two largest mounds were restored afterward and the site is open to the public and now includes informational plaques. Excavations produced artifacts made from non local materials such as Greenstone, copper, and galena, and distinctive projectile points that did not originate at the site or even in Mississippi. Similar high prestige exotic goods were also found at Pharr Mounds, a nearby contemporaneous site, which show the local peoples involvement with the Hopewell exchange system, long-distance trade network and religious network.

=== Mound A ===
During excavations of Mound A archaeologists found the remains of a woman who had been placed between two parallel burned oak logs buried at the base of the mound. They also found ornamental copper spools at each of her wrists. They also found the remains of two adult males and a child.

=== Mound B ===
The largest mound at the site, Mound B, was found to be covering a log lined crematory pit. Archaeologists found twenty nine polished greenstone celts arranged in an L-shaped pattern. They also found human remains, some cremated and others unburned, on the ash-covered floor of the pit. Exotic artifacts including copper ear-spools, nineteen chert projectile points believed to have been imported from Hopewell peoples in Illinois, and a piece of galena were also found.
