= John Gordon (militia captain) =

Andrew Jackson affiliate (1759–1819)

- Born: July 15, 1759; Spotsylvania County, Colony of Virginia
- Died: June 6, 1819 (aged 59); Gordon House, Hickman County, Tennessee
- Military career
- Allegiance: United States
- Branch: Tennessee Militia
- Rank: captain
- Conflicts: Nickajack Expedition; Creek War; Battle of Talladega; Battle of Horseshoe Bend; War of 1812
- Other work: pioneer, planter, land speculator

John Gordon (July 15, 1759 – June 6, 1819) was an American frontiersman, trader with Native Americans, planter, and militia captain in several Indian wars. Part of the post-Revolutionary War settlement of the trans-Appalachian frontier, Gordon was an early settler in the Nashville, Tennessee area. He gained notability and rank in the Tennessee Militia, fighting against the Creeks and Seminoles for Andrew Jackson. Jackson referred to him as his Captain of "the Spies," a unit of mounted scouts.

Partnering with a Chickasaw chieftain, Gordon helped improve the Natchez Trace, which gave access to the settlers pushing into western Tennessee and south into the Louisiana and Mississippi territories. He participated in the Creek War, including its conclusion at the Battle of Horseshoe Bend.

== Early life and Tennessee settler ==
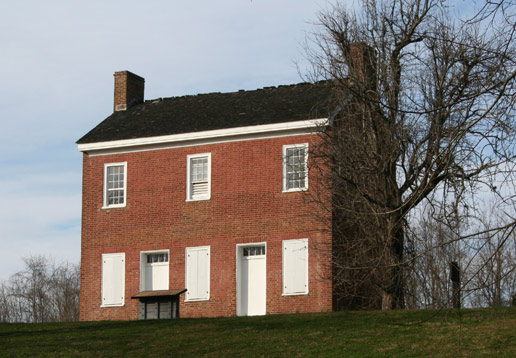
John Gordon's house on the Duck River. Site of Gordon and Chief William Colbert's ferry, and the Gordon plantation. Now maintained as part of the Natchez Trace National Parkway.

Gordon was born in Spotsylvania County, Virginia, to an aristocratic landholding family. His father had fought in the War of Independence as a lieutenant, and settled the family in Nashville after the war.

As a young man, John Gordon made a name for himself as an Indian fighter, riding with the militia to investigate reports of attacks on cabins and farmsteads around Nashville. In 1793 he was commissioned by Territorial Governor William Blount as a captain in the militia. In 1794, he rode in the Nickajack campaign against the Chickamauga Cherokee, who violently defended their Tennessee River Gorge homeland.

After Tennessee statehood in 1796, Gordon was appointed its first postmaster, a position also later held by his son-in-law, Confederate States General Felix Kirk Zollicoffer. Gordon had a plantation in Nashville where he made money from horse racing, but was eventually forced to sell the land to pay off debts.

During this time, Gordon married Dorothea "Dolly" Cross, the daughter of another Virginian who had settled in Nashville. Cross and Gordon, coming from the first families of Virginia, were both descended from Pocahontas. Their youngest daughter, born on February 21, 1819, was named Louisa Pocahontas Gordon.

== Later career ==
In January 1805 he was a signatory to a petition protesting the court-martial of Thomas Butler, probably produced at the behest of Andrew Jackson and sent to Thomas Jefferson's government. (Note: Disobedience of Orders Justified on the Grounds of Illegality, communicated to the Senate January 30, 1805. Enclosure 58, 8th Congress, 2nd Session.)

It was in the militia that Gordon first came in contact with the Chickasaw Indians, with whom he would maintain friendly contact throughout his life. He later acquired some land within the Chickasaw Nation in present day Hickman County on the Duck River. Here he established a plantation of over fifteen-hundred acres. The land was located at a spot where the Natchez Trace, the old Indian trail then used by settlers going into the Mississippi Territory, crossed the Duck River. In a partnership with Chickasaw Chief William "Chooshemataha" Colbert, Gordon provided ferry service and ran a trading post along the trace. The Chickasaw ceded the land to Tennessee in 1805 and Gordon moved his family to a large house there in 1812. The Gordon House is still there, now maintained by the National Park Service as part of the Natchez Trace National Parkway.

Leach is of the opinion that John Gordon and Andrew Jackson were acquainted with each other prior to the War of 1812.

=== The Creek War ===
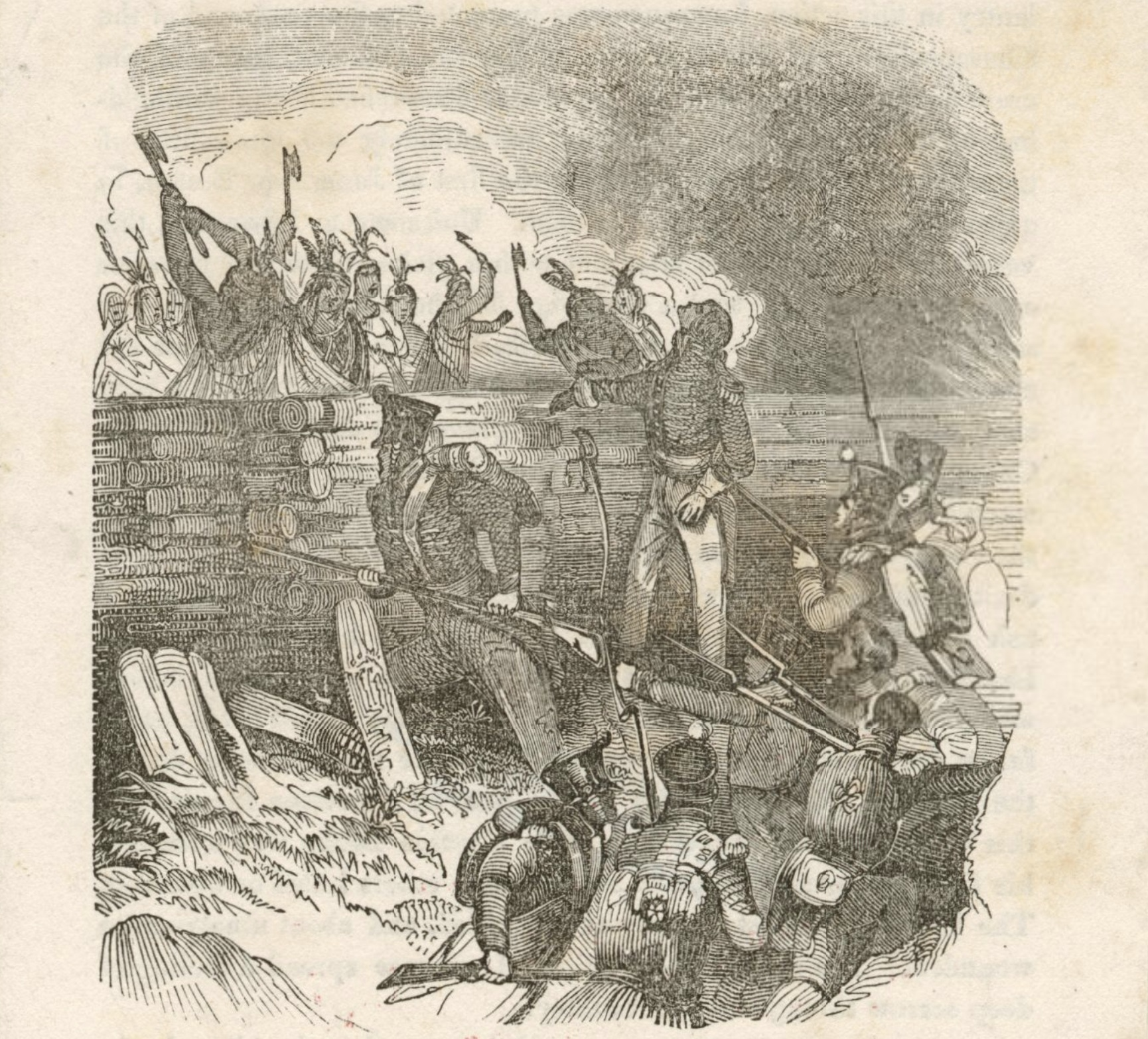
The Battle of Horseshoe Bend

Gordon commenced active duty on September 24, 1813 and continued to serve up to May 10, 1814. His mounted company of "Spies", utilized in a reconnaissance scouting role, were mobilized at Fayetteville, according to the surviving muster rolls. At the end of January 1814 his mounted company of "Spies" amounted to 30 men.

Now referred to as "Captain of the Spies" in the Tennessee state militia, Gordon led militiamen and friendly Indians against hostile Indians. It was during this time that the Muscogee Creek Confederacy dissolved into a civil war, with traditionalist Creek "Red Sticks" calling for the Creek people to stop ceding land to the United States and adopting western styles of society and agriculture. The Creek Nation called on Tennessee to help put down the so-called "Red Stick rebellion", named for the painted red war clubs brandished by the Creek priests. It was in the militia that Gordon made the acquaintance of Andrew Jackson, who led the campaign.

When starving Tennesseans threatened to mutiny against "Old Hickory", Gordon was the first to answer Jackson's plea "If only two men remain with me, I will never abandon this fort," to which Captain Gordon replied, "You have one, general; let's look to see if we can't find another." This facetious response supposedly made to Jackson was recounted in Gordon's obituary in The Nashville Gazette, June 23, 1819.

Gordon fought against the Red Sticks in 1813 at the Battle of Talladega. (In a letter sent to his wife later in the campaign, following on from the engagements at Emuckfau and Enotochopco, Jackson noted Gordon for his courage, saying: "... Captain Gordon who was in front at [the head] of the spies rushed to the fight, and entered into the persuit [sic] ...") (Note: Letter from Andrew Jackson to Rachel Jackson, dated January 28, 1814) Gordon was mentioned in despatches dated January 29, 1814 sent by Jackson and addressed to Thomas Pinckney as the administrator of American forces in the Southern United States at Fort Strother.

Gordon was mentioned in a report dated March 31, 1814 sent by Jackson and addressed to Willie Blount as the Governor of Tennessee at Fort Williams, mentioning the attack on Horseshoe Bend, 'the left extremity of the line by Capt Gordon of the Spies and Capt. McMurry, of Gen'l Johnston's Brigade of West Tennessee Militia.'.

Horseshoe Bend was the scene of the defeat of the Red Sticks. Jackson then forced the Creeks into a crippling land cession of over 23 million acres in present day Alabama and Georgia as part of the Treaty of Fort Jackson.

=== The Pensacola myth ===
A highly romanticized portrayal, of the 55 year old John Gordon's visitation to Pensacola, has been recounted by his family in a vanity press article from 1906, which places the events four months in advance of when they actually took place, and portrays him as a "spy" whose presence was unnoticed:

Gordon provided the reconnaissance for Jackson's controversial capture of Pensacola which led to the Battle of New Orleans. After Horseshoe Bend, Jackson instructed Gordon to secretly go to Pensacola to see if the British were using the Spanish fort as a base to provide Creek and Seminole Indians with arms. Gordon went on the dangerous mission, passing through Creek territory, and barely escaped after having found the British flag flying at Pensacola and British troops arming Creek warriors.

Gordon's son-in-law, Felix Zollicoffer, wrote in an article about the affair:

It was Capt. Gordon who performed that memorable and perilous service of penetrating alone a forest 300 miles from Hickory Grounds to Pensacola, encountering and evading various Indian parties, and procuring for Gen. Jackson that valuable knowledge of Spanish fortifications and of the Spanish complicity with British and Indian enemies which at once determined him upon and gave him the key to the famous capture of Pensacola.

With Gordon's affirmative report, Jackson captured the town with use of the Tennessee Militia, angering many in the Federal Government.

=== Mission to Pensacola ===
Jackson was concerned that the Spanish had not been maintaining a neutral stance towards the Americans and British, but his aggressive behavior would ultimately push the Spanish governor to align himself with the British. It became apparent that Jackson would be prepared to attack Pensacola. Jackson would force the issue, being well aware of Manrique's position of weakness.

Gordon traveled to Pensacola, arriving on July 20, 1814. (Note: Cox has identified a primary source which states "On the 19th [July] arrived here Jno Gordon with dispatches from Gen. Jackson") He had spoken to Governor Manrique, to whom he delivered a letter from Jackson. Manrique's reply was dated July 26. Governor Manrique summonsed Gordon on the day that he received the letter. He considered the letter to be impertinent in its demands to surrender two Indian Chiefs to Jackson. Given that Americans were harming Indians in Spanish territory without the consent of the Governor, he felt authorized to arm the Indians, it being implied to Gordon this would take place. His report dated July 29 was provided to Jackson. It made mention of discovering there was now a British presence at Prospect Bluff, and others confirming that three thousand muskets had been supplied by the British. Based upon what others told him, it was rumored the Indians were being provided with arms and ammunition by the Spanish 'but did not see it myself.' There were further rumors of reinforcements from Havana, with a large British force to arrive in September. It was rumored that six hundred British troops were at Apalachicola, Florida. The evening before Gordon departed, it was rumored Spain had declared war. Jackson forwarded this report on July 30, 1814 to the Secretary of War.

In the subsequent weeks, the newspapers in Havana were reporting that 25,000 soldiers of Wellington's peninsular army had allegedly arrived in Bermuda in August. Manrique was in a precarious situation. He took the initiative, and in August 1814 approached the British, inviting them to Pensacola. The British were observed docking the 25th and unloading the 26th.

In his letter dated August 24, Jackson criticized Manrique for allowing British agents to operate in Pensacola and warned him that he would consider him personally responsible for any depredations suffered by American citizens. Gordon did not participate in neither the attack on Pensacola in November 1814, nor the subsequent Battle of New Orleans.

== Return home ==
During their marriage, Gordon's wife, Dolly, raised eleven children and oversaw the planting of cotton and orchards, and the construction of the house that still stands today on the banks of the Duck River. By some accounts, Dolly served as friend and nurse to the many Indians (probably Chickasaw), who remained in the area or who made regular use of Gordon's ferry and trading post.

== Death ==
In 1818, Jackson asked Gordon to accompany him on a campaign into Florida that became known as the First Seminole War. The harsh climate of Florida proved to be too much for Gordon, however, and he died later in 1819 at his home. Dolly remained in the home until her death in 1859. Gordon and Dolly are buried at Rose Hill Cemetery in Columbia, Tennessee.

The author John Steele Gordon is a descendant.

== Bibliography ==
- Bassett, John Spencer, ed. (1926). Correspondence of Andrew Jackson. Vol. I: to April 1814. Washington, D.C.: Carnegie Institution of Washington.
- Bassett, John Spencer, ed. (1969) [1927]. Correspondence of Andrew Jackson. Vol. II: May 1, 1814 to December 31, 1819. Washington, D.C.: Carnegie Institution of Washington. OCLC 1082121859.
- Cox, Dale (2020). The fort at Prospect Bluff. Old Kitchen Books. ISBN 978-0-57-863462-3.
- Hughes, Christine F.; Brodine, Charles E., eds. (2023). The Naval War of 1812: A Documentary History, Vol. 4. Washington: Naval Historical Center (GPO). ISBN 978-1-943604-36-4.
- Leach, Douglas Edward (December 1959). "John Gordon of Gordon's Ferry". Tennessee Historical Quarterly. 18 (4): 322–344.
- Owsley, Frank L. Jr. (2017) [1981]. Struggle for the Gulf Borderlands: The Creek War and the Battle of New Orleans, 1812–1815 (PDF). Gainesville: University Press of Florida. ISBN 978-0-8173-1062-2.
- Sugden, John (January 1982). "The Southern Indians in the War of 1812: The Closing Phase". Florida Historical Quarterly. 60 (3): 300. JSTOR 30146793.
