= John Gordon House =

Historic house in Tennessee, United States

- U.S. National Register of Historic Places
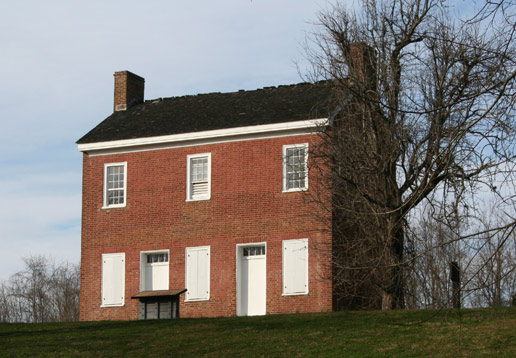

- Location within Tennessee Location within the United States
- Nearest city: Williamsport, Tennessee
- Coordinates: 35°43′11″N 87°15′38″W
- Area: 10 acres (4.0 ha)
- Built: 1818
- Architectural style: Georgian
- NRHP reference No.: 74000333
- Added to NRHP: April 18, 1974

The John Gordon House is a historic brick home located along the Old Natchez Trace near Williamsport, Tennessee, within the boundaries of the Natchez Trace Parkway, a National Park Service unit.

== History ==
The house was built in 1818. It is one of only two remaining structures from the early history of the Natchez Trace located along the Natchez Trace Parkway. It was built by John Gordon and his wife Dolly, the main house of a plantation that included 1500 acres, a ferry over the Duck River and a trading post. The land was originally located in Chickasaw territory when Gordon acquired it.

The National Park Service acquired the Gordon House and surrounding property in 1973. In 1974, the home was listed on the National Register of Historic Places. The exterior of the house has been restored to its 1818 appearance.
