= Mangum Mound Site =

Archaeological site in Mississippi, US

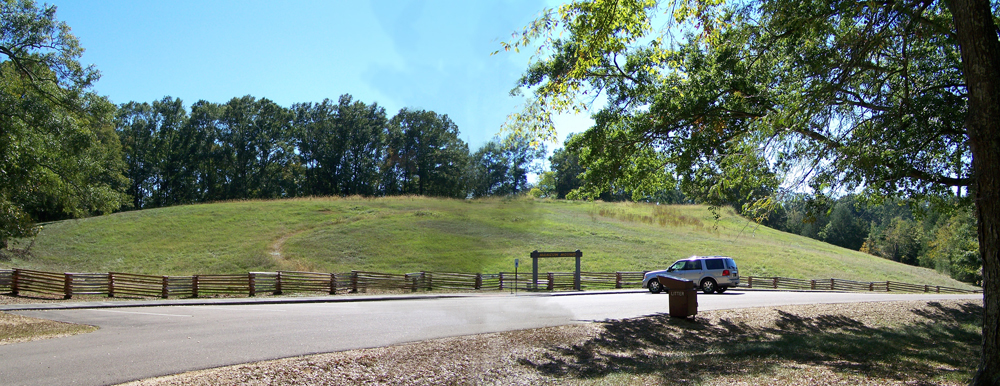
- Mangum Mound

- Location within Mississippi today
- 31°59′30.3″N 90°53′59.14″W
- Periods: Foster Phase
- Cultures: Plaquemine culture
- Location: Port Gibson, Claiborne County, Mississippi, USA
- Region: Claiborne County, Mississippi

Site notes
- Excavation dates: 1936, 1951, 1963
- Archaeologists: Charles F. Bohannon
- Responsible body: State of Mississippi

Mangum Mound Site (22 CB 584) is an archaeological site of the Plaquemine culture in Claiborne County, Mississippi. It is located at milepost 45.7 on the Natchez Trace Parkway. Two very rare Mississippian culture repoussé copper plates have been discovered during excavations of the site. The site was used as a burial mound during the Foster Phase of the culture (1350 to 1500 CE) and is believed to have been abandoned before the 1540 expedition of Hernando de Soto.

== Description ==
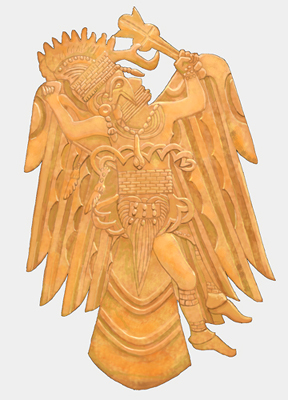
Reconstruction of the plate found at Mangum

The burial mound was first investigated in 1936 by its owner Spurgeon C. Mangum, a farmer. Mangum found human remains, various pottery fragments belonging to the Plaquemine culture, chunkey stones, and three fragments of a repoussé copper plate with an avian design similar to other plates found throughout the American Midwest and Southeast. These portray the Birdman motif important to the Southeastern Ceremonial Complex (SECC). The site underwent a series of test excavations in April 1951 as part of the Natchez Trace Park Survey. During these excavations, twelve extended burials and possibly one bundled burial were found.

The site was excavated in 1963 for the National Park Service by archaeologist Charles F. Bohannon. Bohannon and his team found the burials of numerous individuals. One individual, believed to have been a woman in her late 30s, possessed markings on her bones which suggested to investigators that she suffered from multiple myeloma. Bohannon excavated the remains of eighty-four individuals, of which more than half were bundled burials. Some of the bundles seemed little more than disarticulated piles of bones, and Bohannon came to believe they were earlier burials that had been moved to make way for new extended burials. Another copper plate was also found during these excavations.

== See also ==
- Culture, phase, and chronological table for the Mississippi Valley
