= Grand Gulf Mound =

Archaeological site in United States of America

- Periods: Woodland period
- Cultures: Marksville culture
- Location: Port Gibson, Mississippi, Claiborne County, Mississippi, United States
- Region: Claiborne County, Mississippi

History
- Built: 50CE
- Abandoned: 200 CE

Site notes
- Architectural style: Burial mound

The Grand Gulf Mound (22CB522) is an Early Marksville culture archaeological site located near Port Gibson in Claiborne County, Mississippi, on a bluff 1 mile (1.6 km) east of the Mississippi River, 2 miles (3.2 km) north of the mouth of the Big Black River.

== Archaeological context ==
The site is believed to have been occupied from 50 to 200 CE and to be the only site in the Natchez Bluffs region to have been actively involved in the Hopewell Interaction Sphere. It is one of four mounds in the area believed to date to the Early Marksville period, the other three being the Marskville Mound 4 and Crooks Mounds A and B, all located in nearby Louisiana.

== Site description ==
The site features one extant burial mound, and may have possibly had two others in the past. Copper objects, Marksville culture ceramics and a stone platform pipe were found in excavations at the site.

== Construction sequence ==
The bural mound was built in several stages over many years, very similar to the Crooks Mound A in La Salle Parish, Louisiana. Unlike some other Hopewell sites, such as the Tremper Mound in Scioto County, Ohio, the site showed no evidence of a mortuary or communal structure previous to the construction of the mound.

Construction is believed to have proceeded as follows:

- First, a rectangular earthen platform was constructed, .5 feet (0.15 m) in height, 20 feet (6.1 m) wide on its east–west axis and 3.5 feet (1.1 m) long on its north–south axis.
- After a period of use, this platform was covered with a mantle of earth 5.5 feet (1.7 m) in height and 26.5 feet (8.1 m) wide along its east–west axis, with an extremely hard cap of earth 0.2 feet (0.061 m) covering the mound.
- During the third stage, another mantle of earth was added to the mound, bringing it to a height of 10 feet (3.0 m) and to approximately 32 feet (9.8 m) in width on its east–west axis.

== See also ==
- Grand Gulf Military State Park (Mississippi)
- List of Hopewell sites
