= Houlka Creek =

Stream in Mississippi, U.S.

Coordinates: 33.7384505°N 88.7500505°W

Houlka Creek is a stream in the U.S. state of Mississippi. It is a tributary to Chuquatonchee Creek.

Houlka is a name derived from the Choctaw language purported to mean "calf of the leg". Variant names are "Holky Creek", "Hoolka Creek", "Hoolky Creek" and "Sheco Creek"
