= Rocky Springs, Mississippi =

- Ghost town
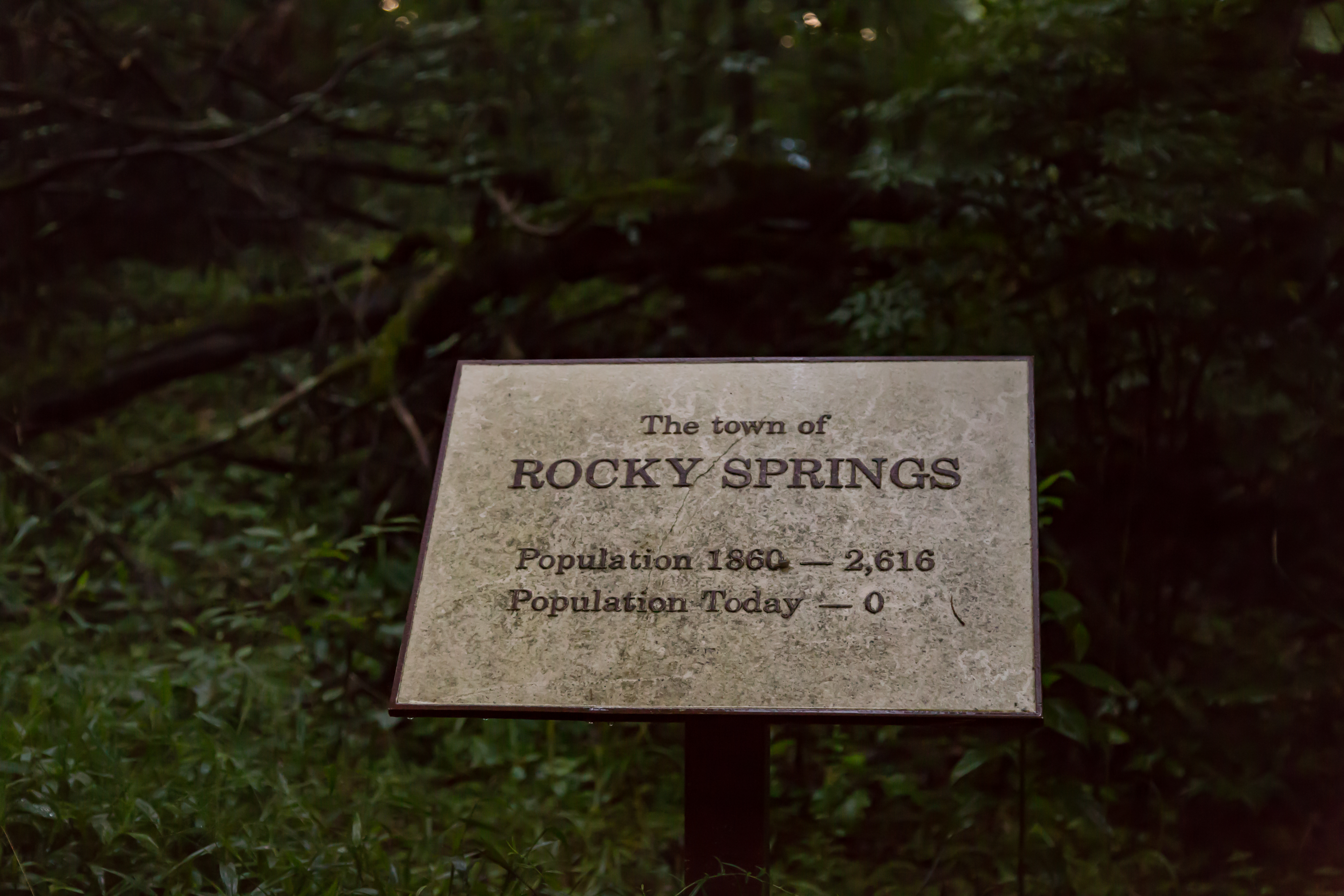
- Marker at site of Rocky Springs

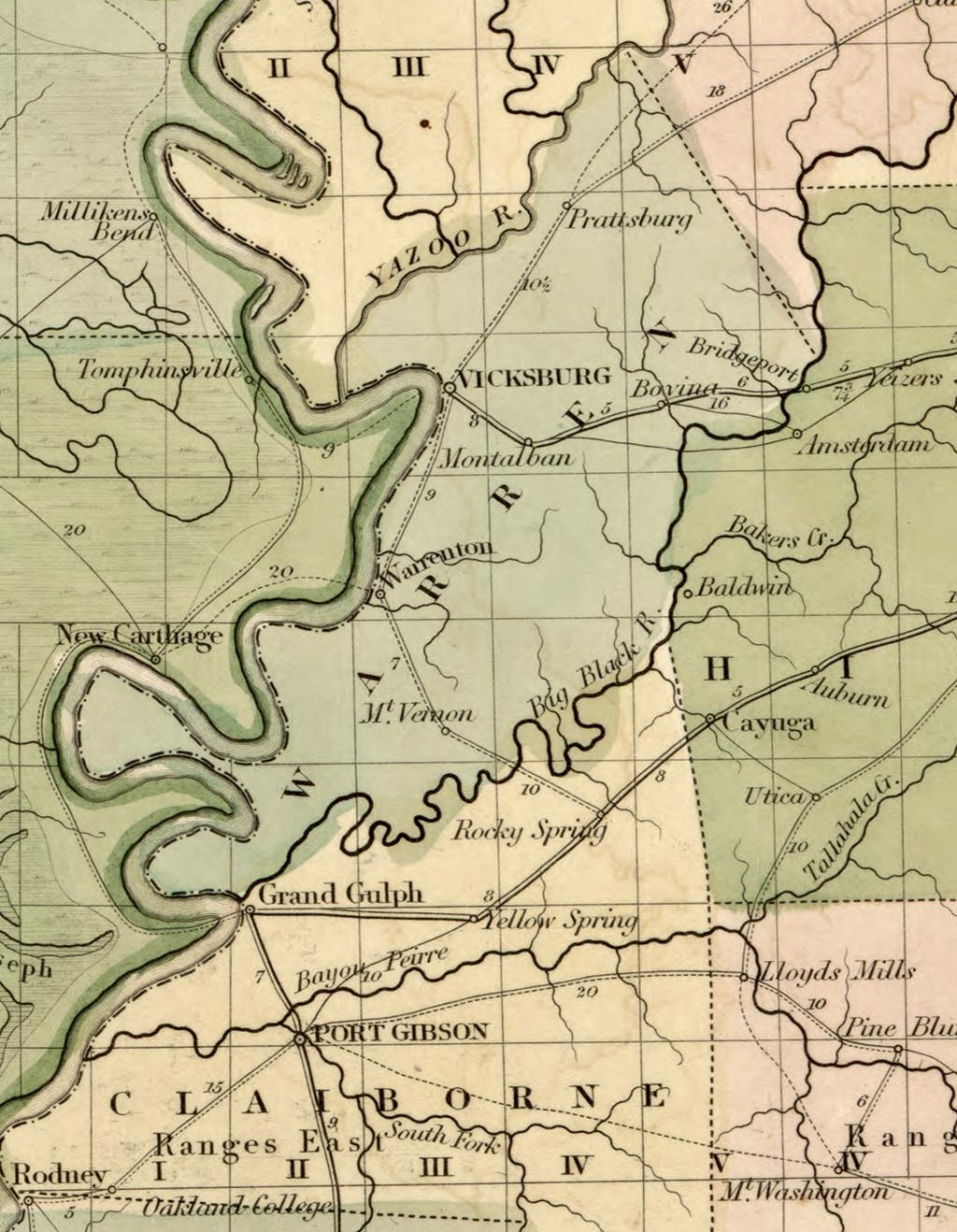
- Mississippi River between Vicksburg and Rodney c. 1839 showing major roads and towns north of Natchez

- Location of Rocky Springs Rocky Springs (the United States)
- Coordinates: 32°05′20″N 90°48′54″W
- Country: United States
- State: Mississippi
- County: Claiborne
- Elevation: 312 ft (95 m)
- Time zone: UTC-6 (Central (CST))
  - Summer (DST): UTC-5 (CDT)
- GNIS feature ID: 692184

Rocky Springs is a ghost town and historic site located in Claiborne County, Mississippi, United States, between Old Port Gibson Road and the Natchez Trace Parkway (mile post 54.8). The old town site can be viewed by the public during daylight hours. Rocky Springs and the surrounding area is maintained by the National Park Service.

== History ==
Rocky Springs was established in the late 1700s as a popular watering place for travelers along the old Natchez Trace, near a natural spring and rock outcrop, from which the budding community would take its name. In 1796, Mayburn Cooper settled in the area, and was recorded in the 1816 census as a land owner. In 1829, the Rocky Springs election precinct received 90 votes. A Methodist church was erected in 1837. The first private school, Rocky Springs Academy, opened in 1838. By 1860, the community of Rocky Springs had reached a maximum population of 2,616 inhabitants, plus approximately 2,000 slaves, all living in a 25-square-mile (65 km^{2}) area. According to the NPS, at its height the town proper contained three merchants, four physicians, four teachers, three clergy and 13 artisans. Cotton farming was the main economic driver. A post office operated under the name Rocky Springs from 1819 to 1932.

=== Lynching ===
On May 17, 1894, a Black man, Amos Hicks, was shot and killed in his home by a group of white men. It was allegedly suspected that Hicks might have burned some buildings owned by a white man by the name of Crawford.

=== Decline ===
The community of Rocky Springs began to decline during the Civil War, at which time Union forces passed through the area during the advance on nearby Port Gibson. In 1878 the remaining inhabitants of Rocky Springs faced an outbreak of yellow fever. Later, valuable cotton crops were destroyed by an infestation of boll weevils, while at the same time farmers were struggling with severe erosion caused by many years of poor land management. In 1930, the last store closed, and the natural spring, from which the town took its name, dried up.

=== Present day ===
Today, the old town site of Rocky Springs can be viewed by the public during daylight hours. The Methodist church built in 1837 is the only remaining structure, which continued to hold regular Sunday services until 2010 when its congregation became too small to sustain worship. Some remnants of the town can be viewed along a short loop trail, including a post office safe and a cistern. Placards placed along the trail by the NPS offer historical information about the town's growth and decline. A small graveyard adjacent to the church is maintained, and is the grave site of some the original settlers.

== Gallery ==
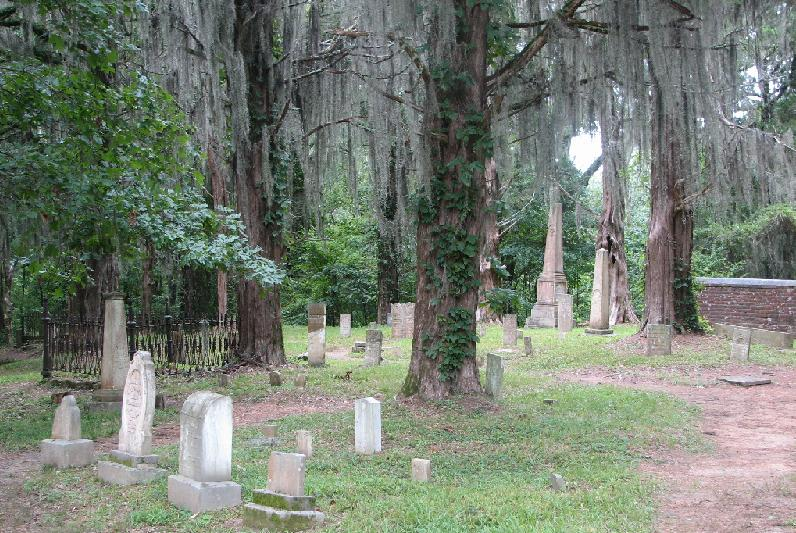
Rocky Springs Cemetery

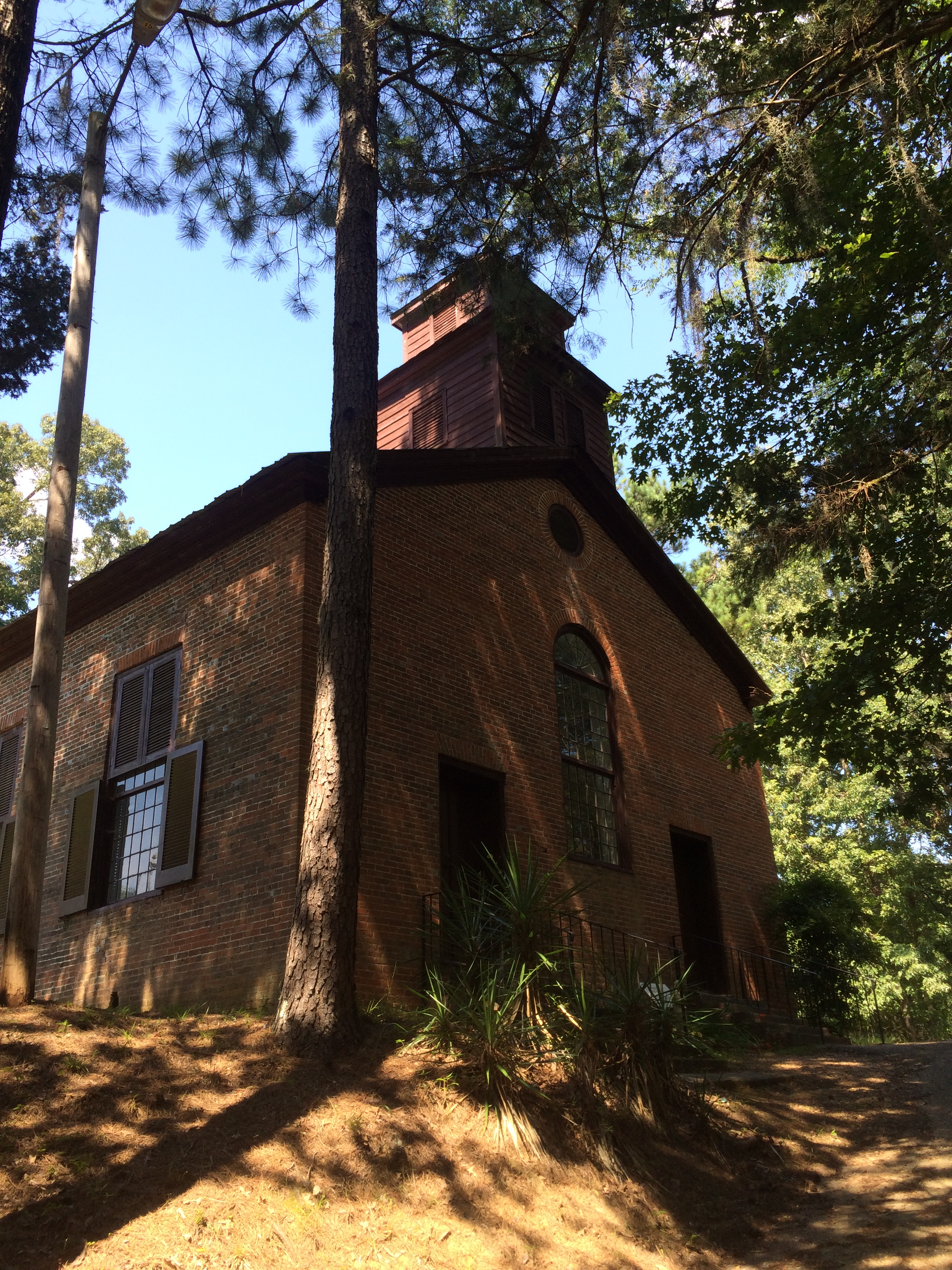
Rocky Springs Methodist Church

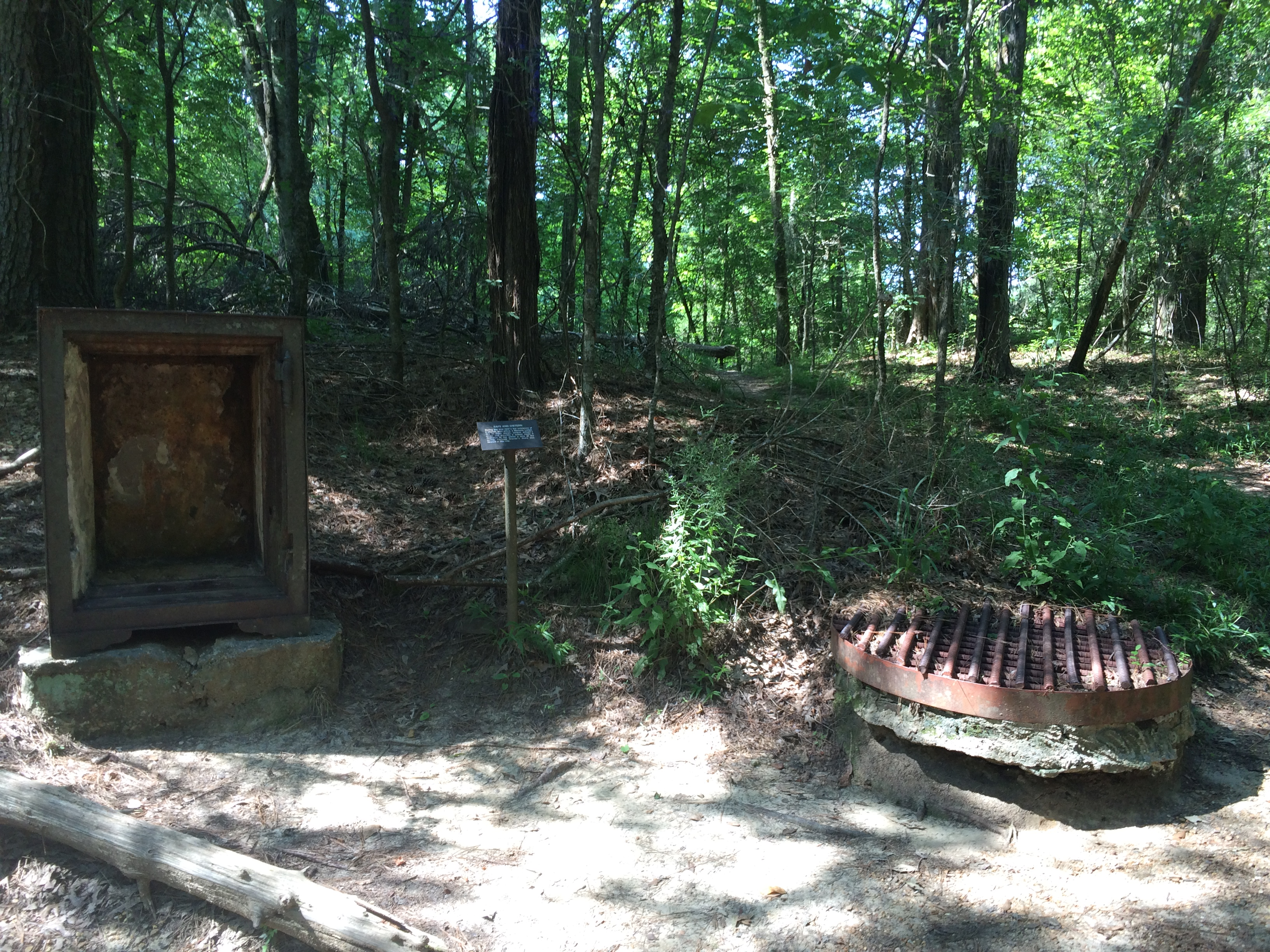
Post office safe and covered cistern

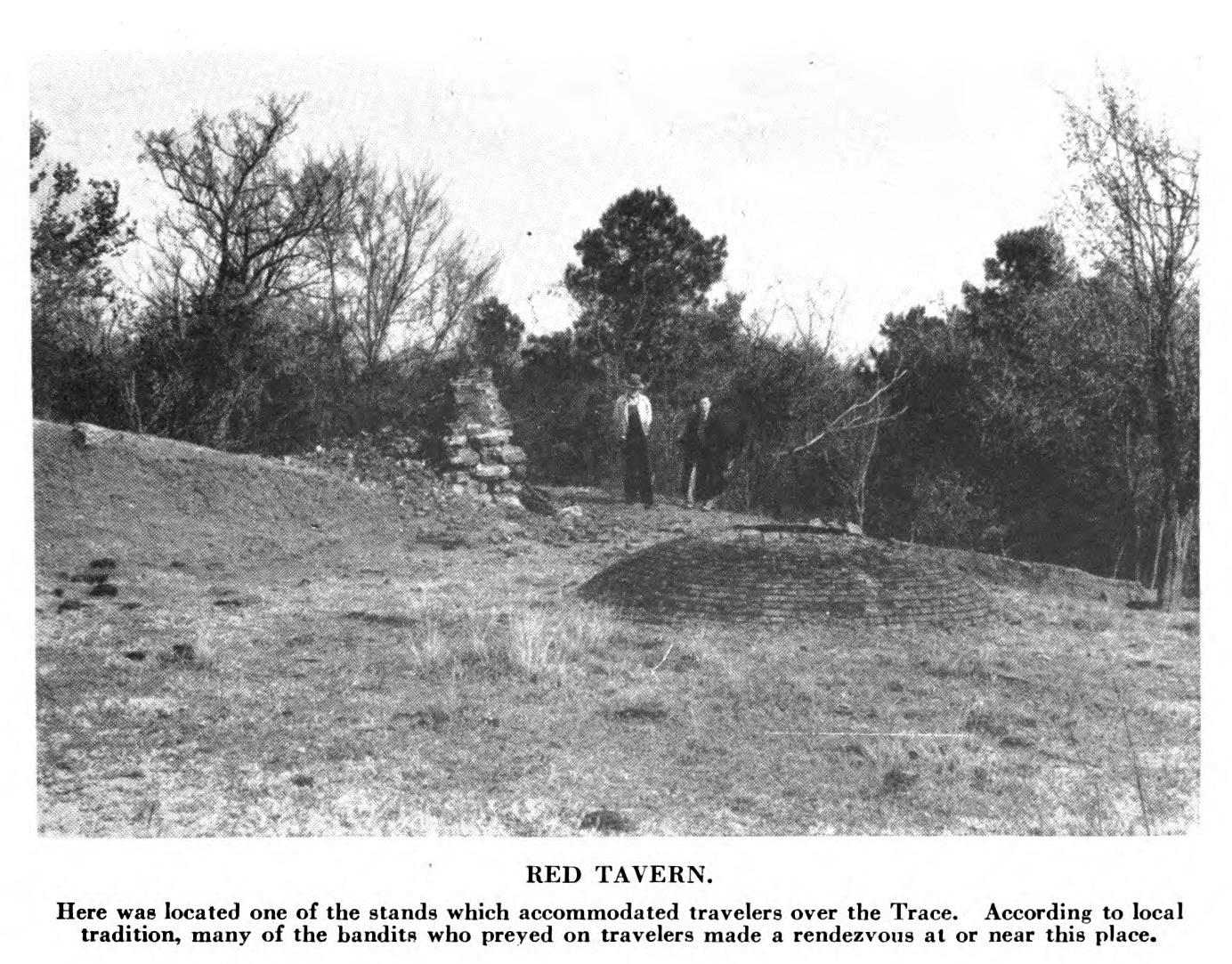
Ruins of the Red Tavern of the Natchez Trace photographed c. 1938
