= Marksville culture =

Archaeological culture in the south-eastern United States

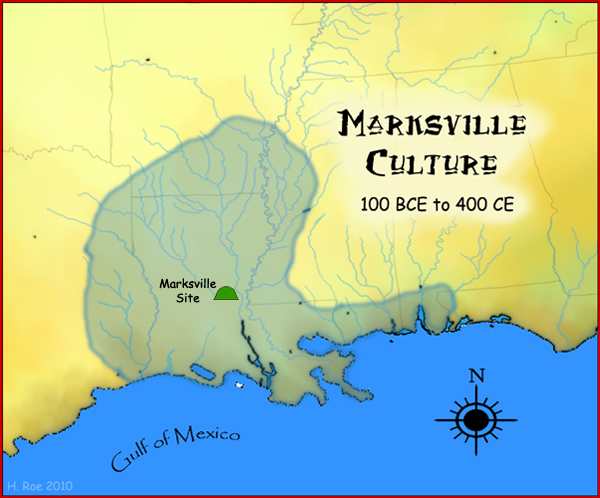
A map showing the geographical extent of the Marksville cultural period.

The Marksville culture was an archaeological culture in the lower Lower Mississippi valley, Yazoo valley, and Tensas valley areas of present-day Louisiana, Mississippi, Arkansas, and extended eastward along the Gulf Coast to the Mobile Bay area, from 100 BCE to 400 CE. This culture takes its name from the Marksville Prehistoric Indian Site in Avoyelles Parish, Louisiana. Marksville Culture was contemporaneous with the Hopewell cultures within present-day Ohio and Illinois. It evolved from the earlier Tchefuncte culture and into the Baytown and Troyville cultures, and later the Coles Creek and Plum Bayou cultures. It is considered ancestral to the historic Natchez and Taensa peoples.

== Description ==
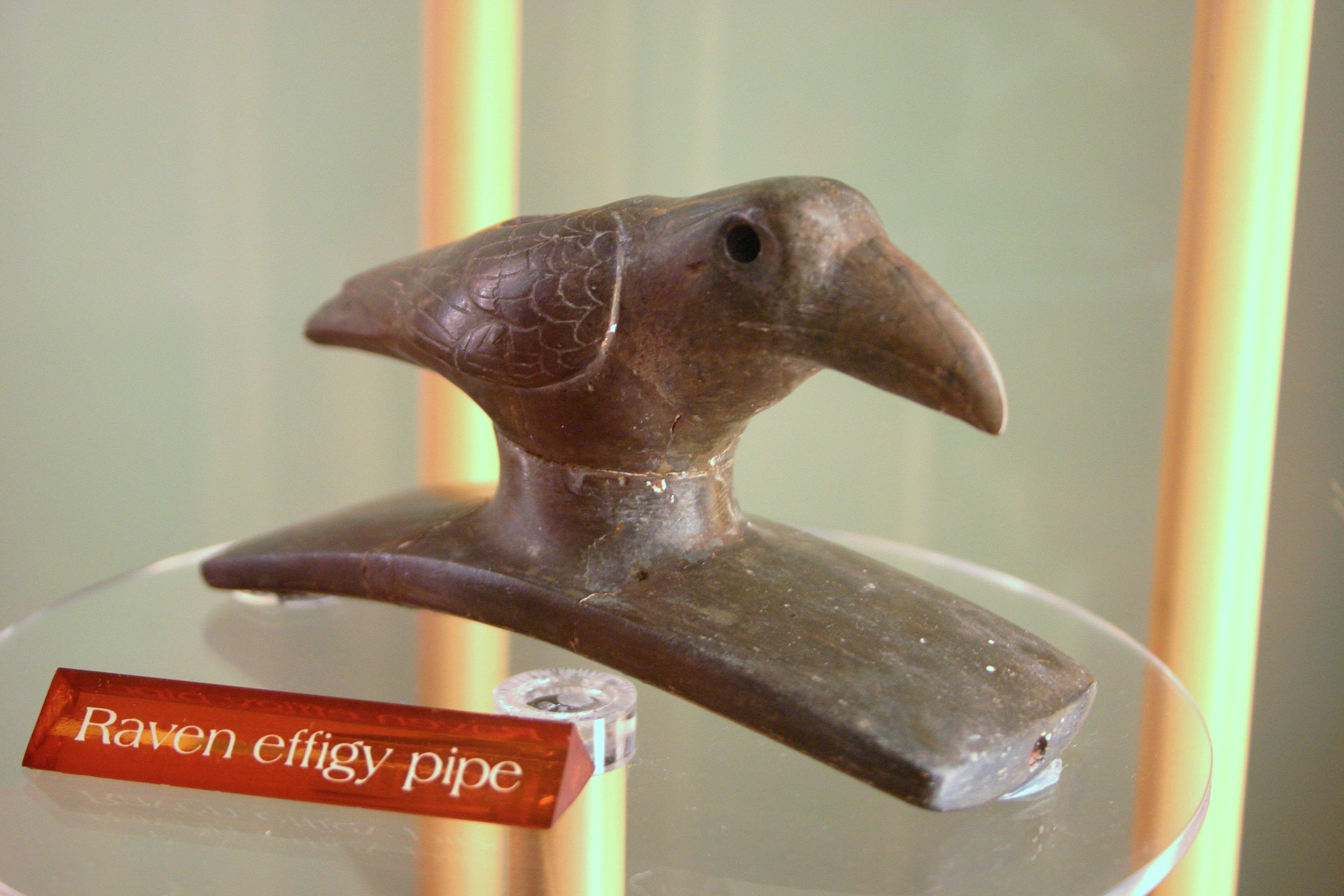
Hopewell platform stone pipe from Ohio

The Hopewell tradition was a widely dispersed set of related populations, which were connected by a common network of trade routes, known as the Hopewell Exchange System. The Marksville culture was a southern manifestation of this network. Settlements were large and usually located on terraces of major streams. Evidence from excavations of burial mounds from this period suggest they were constructed for persons of high social status, and contained refined grave goods of imported exotic materials, such as copper panpipes, earspools, bracelets and beads, rare minerals, stone platform pipes, mica figurines, marine shells, freshwater pearls, and greenstone celts. The pipes had flat bases with a hole for a stem, and a bowl in the center. Animal figurines on the platform are not unusual, with the bowl being located in the animal's back.

The high-status leaders organized community life, and officiated at burial ceremonies, an important part of the Marksville Culture. The mounds were constructed in stages over many years, with the first stage being a flat, low platform. The ceremonies may have been held years apart, and those who died between ceremonies were temporarily stored in other locations. Their remains were later gathered up and buried together.

The foraging and subsistence practices of the Marksville culture followed the same pattern of the Archaic and Tchefuncte periods.

== Pottery ==
Although made from local clay, Marksville pottery was similar in design and decoration (particularly the surface design) to pottery found in Illinois and Ohio, which suggests larger interaction networks than had been presupposed. A typical vessel was three to five inches tall and three to seven inches in diameter, and often decorated with geometric and effigy designs, usually stylized birds. The well-formed pottery is also decorated with a shallow incision. This decorated pottery was made primarily for ceremonial uses, with other, plainer utilitarian ware for daily use. Marksville pottery influenced Santa Rosa pottery, a defining characteristic of the contemporary Santa Rosa-Swift Creek culture, located to the east of the Marksville culture area along the Gulf coast.

Aside from pottery, the Marksville culture also made jewelries and other artifacts that were usually created as part of the burial ceremony.

== Chronology ==
The Marksville culture was preceded by the Tchefuncte culture, and was eventually succeeded by the Troyville culture in southeastern and eastern Louisiana and western Mississippi, and the Baytown culture in northeastern Louisiana, northwestern Mississippi, and southeastern Arkansas.

== See also ==
- Crooks mound
- Grand Gulf Mound
- List of Hopewell sites
