= Natchez Trace Parkway =

National parkway in the southeastern U.S.

Natchez Trace Parkway
- Natchez Trace Parkway highlighted in brown

Route information
- Maintained by NPS
- Length: 444 mi (715 km)
- Existed: May 18, 1938 –present
- Restrictions: No trucks

Major junctions
- South end: Liberty Road in Natchez, MS
- US 61 in Washington, MS; US 61 in Port Gibson, MS; MS 18 in Port Gibson, MS; I-20 / US 80 in Clinton, MS; US 49 in Jackson, MS; I-55 in Ridgeland, MS; MS 43 in Canton, MS; US 82 in Mathiston, MS; I-22 / US 78 in Tupelo, MS; US 72 in Cherokee, AL; US 64 near Waynesboro, TN; US 412 in Gordonsburg, TN
- North end: SR 100 in Nashville, TN

Location
- Country: United States

Highway system
- Scenic Byways; National; National Forest; BLM; NPS
- Mississippi State Highway System; Interstate; US; State
- Alabama State Highway System; Interstate; US; State
- Tennessee State Routes; Interstate; US; State

The Natchez Trace Parkway is a limited-access national parkway in the Southeastern United States that commemorates the historic Natchez Trace and preserves sections of that original trail. Its central feature is a two-lane road that extends 444 miles (715 km) from Natchez, Mississippi, to Nashville, Tennessee. Access to the parkway is limited, with more than 50 access points in Mississippi, Alabama, and Tennessee. The southern end of the route is in Natchez at its intersection with Liberty Road, and the northern end is northeast of Fairview, Tennessee, in the suburban community of Pasquo, at an intersection with Tennessee State Route 100. In addition to Natchez and Nashville, larger cities along the route include Jackson and Tupelo, Mississippi, and Florence, Alabama. Historian and preservationist Paul Hardin Kapp describes the Parkway as "the most enjoyable and romantic way to arrive in the city," and the "greatest legacy" of the Natchez Garden Club activist group, but "not the real Natchez Trace," rather a "masterpiece in both landscape design and narrative" constructed of "carefully planned vignettes...rolling topography, landscaped with live oaks and hanging Spanish moss."

== Maintenance ==
The road is maintained by the National Park Service and has been designated an All-American Road. Commercial traffic is prohibited along the entire route, and the speed limit is 50 miles per hour (80 km/h), except north of Leiper's Fork, Tennessee, and Ridgeland, Mississippi, where the speed limit is reduced to 40 miles per hour (64 km/h). The total area of the parkway is 51,746.50 acres (209.4 km^{2}), of which 51,680.64 acres (209.1 km^{2}) are federal and 65.86 acres (0.3 km^{2}) are not.

Unlike the older Blue Ridge Parkway in Virginia and North Carolina, the Natchez Trace Parkway features direct interchanges with Interstate Highways.

The parkway is headquartered in Tupelo and has nine district offices: Leipers Fork, Meriwether Lewis, Cherokee, Tupelo, Dancy, Kosciusko, Ridgeland, Port Gibson, and Natchez. The parkway also manages two battlefields: Brices Cross Roads National Battlefield Site and Tupelo National Battlefield.

== History ==
=== Footpath ===
The gentle sloping and curving alignment of the current route closely follows the original foot passage. Its design harkens back to the way the original interweaving trails aligned as an ancient salt lick-to-grazing pasture migratory route of the American bison and other game that moved between grazing the pastures of central and western Mississippi and the salt and other mineral surface deposits of the Cumberland Plateau. The route generally traverses the tops of the low hills and ridges of the watershed divides from northeast to southwest.

Native Americans, following the "traces" of bison and other game, further improved this walking trail for foot-borne commerce between major villages located in central Mississippi and middle Tennessee. The route is locally circuitous, but by traversing this route, the bison, and later humans, avoided the endless, energy-taxing climbing and descending of the many hills along the way. Also avoided was the danger to a herd (or groups of human travelers) of being caught en masse at the bottom of a hollow or valley if attacked by predators. The nature of the route, to this day, affords good all-around visibility for those who travel it. At all times, the road is on the high ground of the ridge dividing the watersheds and provides a view to either see or catch the scent of danger, from a distance great enough to afford the time to flee to safety, if necessary.

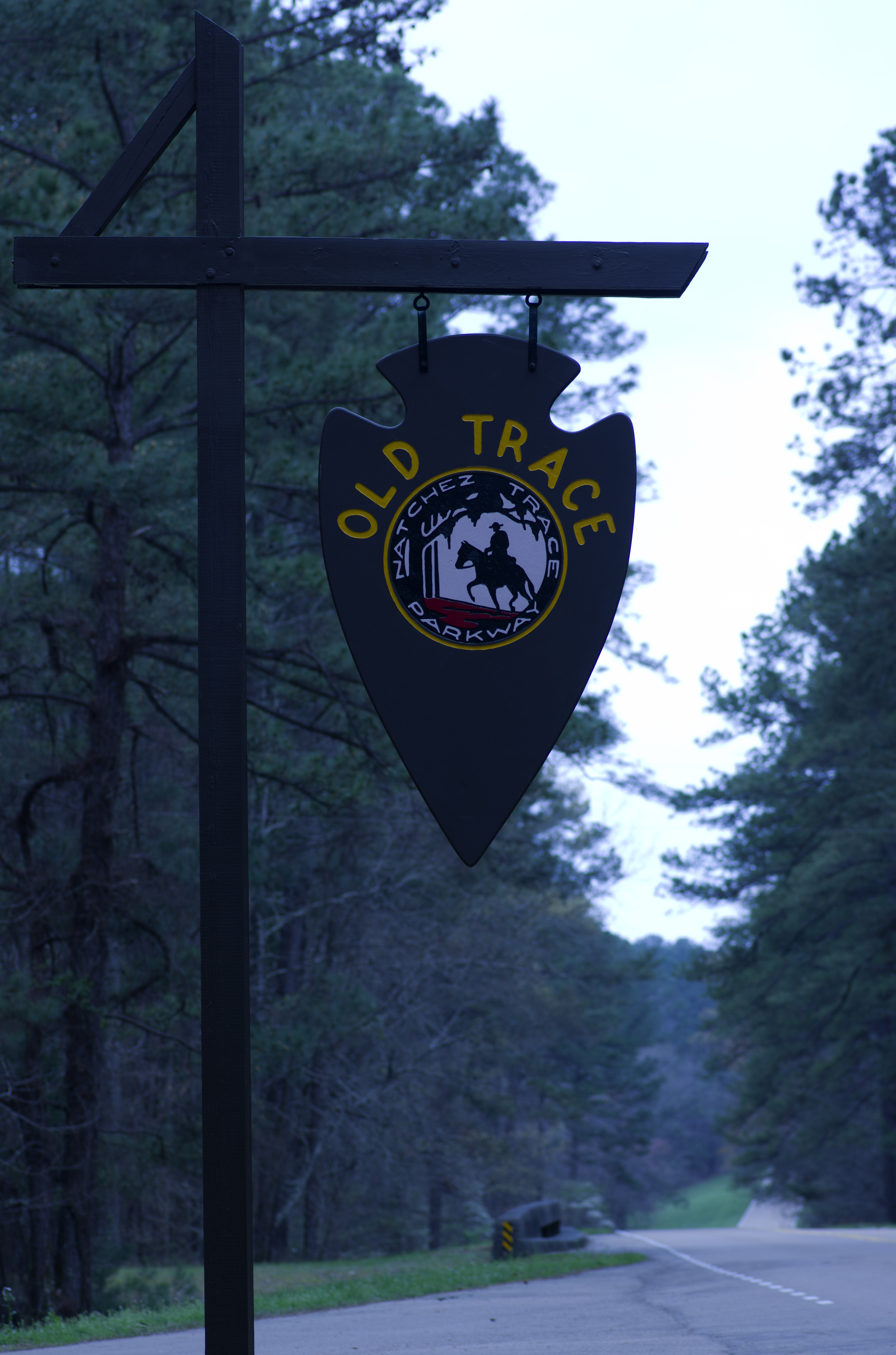
Old Natchez Trace sign southwest of Mathiston, Mississippi

By the time of European exploration and settlement, the route had become well known and established as the fastest means of communication between the Cumberland Plateau, the Mississippi River, and the Gulf of Mexico settlements of Pensacola, Mobile, and New Orleans. In the early post-American Revolutionary War period of America's (south) westward expansion, the trace was the return route for American flat-boat commerce between the territories of the upper and lower Ohio, Tennessee, and Cumberland River valleys. The Americans constructed flat boats, loaded their commerce therein, and drifted upon those rivers, one-way south-southwestward to New Orleans, Louisiana. They would then sell their goods (including the salvageable logs of the flat boats and including enslaved people), and return home via the trace (for the middle section of their return trip), to as far away as Pittsburgh, Pennsylvania.

Improved communications (steam boats, stagecoach lines, and railroads) and the development of ports along the rivers named above (e.g., Natchez; Memphis, Tennessee; Paducah, Kentucky; Nashville, Tennessee; and Louisville, Kentucky) made the route obsolete as a means of passenger and freight commerce. As a result, no major population centers developed along the trace, because of its alignment, between its termini in Nashville and Natchez. The two cities of note, near or on the trace's alignment (Jackson and Tupelo, Mississippi), developed only as a result of their alignment along axes of communication different from the trace. Thus, the trace and its alignment are today almost entirely undeveloped and unspoiled along its whole route. Many sections of the original footpath are visible today for observing and hiking the parkway's right-of-way.

The Natchez Trace National Scenic Trail includes five sections of hiking and horse-riding trails.

=== Civilian Conservation Corps ===
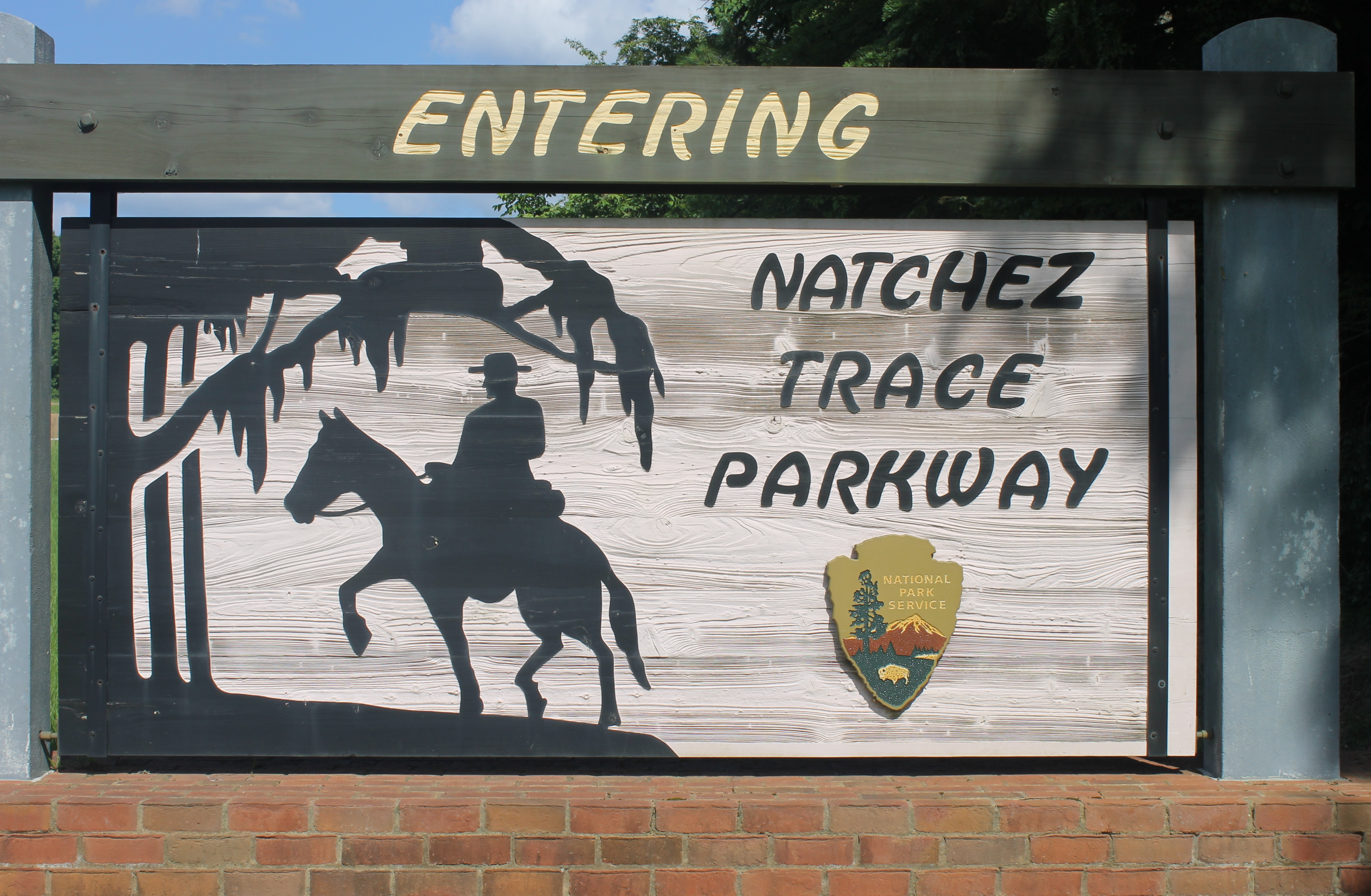
Entrance sign to the parkway near Natchez, Mississippi

Construction of the parkway was begun by the federal government in the 1930s, one of the many projects of the Civilian Conservation Corps during the Great Depression. The road was the proposal of U.S. Congressman T. Jeff Busby of Mississippi, who proposed it as a way to give tribute to the original Natchez Trace. Inspired by the proposal, the Daughters of the American Revolution began planting markers and monuments along the trace. In 1934, the Franklin Delano Roosevelt administration ordered a survey. President Roosevelt signed the legislation to create the parkway on May 18, 1938. Construction on the Parkway began in 1939, and the route was to be overseen by the National Park Service. Its length includes more than 45,000 acres (182 km^{2}) and the towering Natchez Trace Parkway Bridge in Williamson County, Tennessee, completed in 1994 and one of only two post-tensioned, segmental concrete-arch bridges in the world.

The Emergency Appropriations Act of June 19, 1934, allocated initial construction funds and established it as a parkway under National Park Service by the act of May 18, 1938.

=== Gaps and completion ===
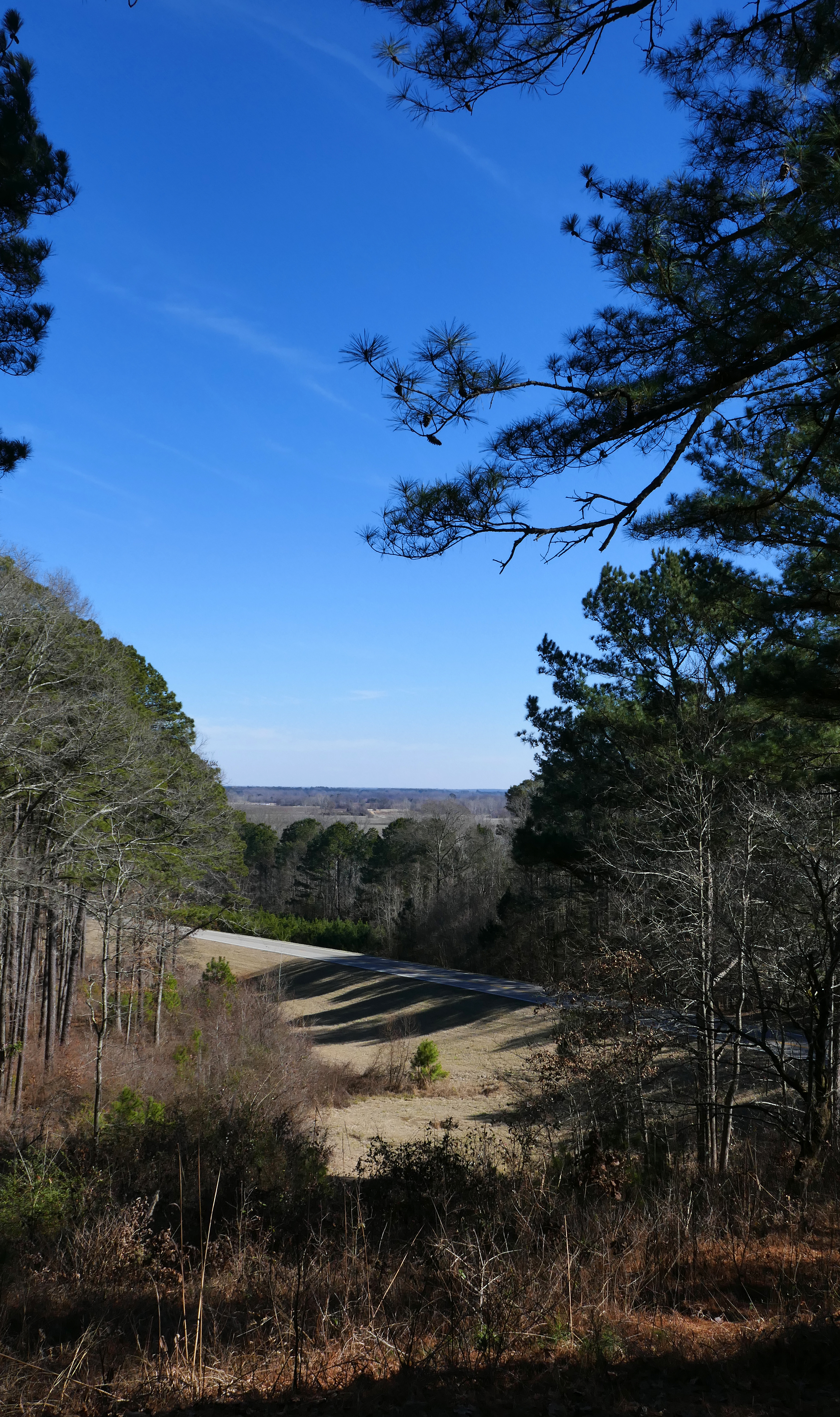
The Natchez Trace Parkway seen from Twentymile Bottom Overlook, milepost 278.4, about 20 miles northeast of Tupelo

For many years in the later 20th century, most of the trace had been complete, but owing to a lack of funds, two gaps remained, both in Mississippi. One was a several-mile-long bypass of Jackson, between Interstate 55 at Ridgeland and Interstate 20 at Clinton. The other was between Liberty Road in the city of Natchez and U.S. Highway 61 near Washington. These final two segments were finally completed and opened on May 21, 2005.

In 2013, a new law required the National Park Service (NPS) to convey about 67 acres of property in the Natchez Trace Parkway to the State of Mississippi. It also adjusted the boundaries of the parkway to include 10 additional acres. The two pieces of land in question originally belonged to Mississippi and were donated to the NPS when it was trying to determine where to end the Natchez Trace Parkway.

== Historical sites ==
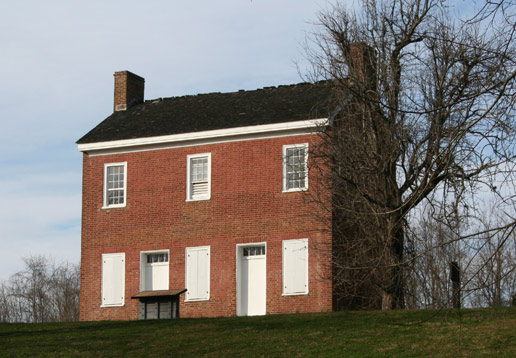
Captain John Gordon's house sits on the site where the Natchez Trace crosses the Duck River. Originally, a ferry operated by Gordon and Chickasaw Chief William Colbert was located here. Gordon and his wife built this Federal-style plantation home, which is one of the oldest structures along the trace.

Numerous historical sites on the Parkway include the Meriwether Lewis Museum, the refurbished Mount Locust stand, Historic French Camp, MS, and the Mississippi Craft Center in Ridgeland, Mississippi, which focuses on promoting Mississippi's native art. Between the Parkway and Old Port Gibson Road is the ghost town of Rocky Springs that thrived in the late 19th century. The old Rocky Springs Methodist Church, the cemetery, and several building sites still exist and are accessible from the parkway. Cypress Swamp is located at mile post 122. Also, several cascading waterfalls can be viewed; for access, some require a bit of hiking from the parkway. Besides, parts of the original trail are still accessible. The history of the Natchez Trace, including the parkway, is summarized at the Natchez Trace Visitor Center in Tupelo.

Emerald Mound, the second-largest Native American ceremonial mound in the United States, is located just west of the trace and north of Highway 61 near Natchez. It offers a unique look at the ingenuity and industry of native culture. Two smaller mounds rise from the top of the main mound and rise above treetops, offering a wide view. Travelers can reach Emerald Mound with a five-minute detour from the main trace highway. Emerald Mound measures 770 feet (230 m) by 435 feet (133 m) at the base and is 35 feet (11 m) in height. The mound was built by depositing earth along the sides of a natural hill, thus reshaping it and creating an enormous artificial plateau.

The Ackia Battleground National Monument (established August 27, 1935, and now called Chickasaw Village) and Meriwether Lewis Park (proclaimed as Meriwether Lewis National Monument February 6, 1925, and transferred from the War Department August 10, 1933) were added to the parkway by the act of August 10, 1961.

== Parkway highlights ==
Highlights include:

=== Natchez to Jackson ===
- Milepost 10.3 Emerald Mound
- 15.5 Mount Locust
- 41.5 Sunken Trace
- 54.8 Abandoned Town of Rocky Springs

=== Jackson to Tupelo ===
- Milepost 105.6 Ross Barnett Reservoir Overlook
- 107.9 West Florida Boundary
- 122.0 Cypress Swamp
- 203.5 Historic settlement of Pigeon Roost
- 232.4 Bynum Mounds
- 261.8 Chickasaw Village Site

=== Tupelo to Tennessee state line ===
- Milepost 266 Natchez Trace Parkway Visitor Center
- 269.4 Old Trace
- 286.7 Pharr Mounds
- 327.3 Colbert Ferry, also site #12 on the North Alabama Birding Trail
- 330.2 Rock Spring Nature Trail, also site #10 on the North Alabama Birding Trail

=== Tennessee ===
- Milepost 385.9 Meriwether Lewis Monument and Grave Site
- 391.9 Fall Hallow Trail
- 401.4 Tobacco Farm and Old Trace Drive
- 404.7 Trail to Jackson Falls and Baker Bluff Overlook
- 438 Bridge at Birdsong Hollow

== Exit list ==
Mileage based on physical mileposts along the parkway. All exits are unnumbered.

State	County	Location	mi	km	Destinations	Notes
Mississippi	Adams	Natchez	0	0.0	Liberty Road	Southern terminus; at-grade intersection
Mississippi	Adams		4	6.4	Elizabeth Female Academy	
Mississippi	Adams		8	13	US 61 – Fayette, Natchez	Partial cloverleaf interchange
Mississippi	Adams		8	13	Old Trace Exhibit	
Mississippi	Adams		10	16	MS 553 – Emerald Mound site, Natchez State Park	At-grade intersection
Mississippi	Jefferson		12	19	Turpin Creek	
Mississippi	Jefferson		12	19	Loess Bluff	
Mississippi	Jefferson		15	24	Mount Locust	
Mississippi	Jefferson		17	27	Coles Creek	
Mississippi	Jefferson		18	29	Bullen Creek	
Mississippi	Jefferson		20	32	MS 553 – Natchez Trace Trail (Potkopinu Section), Fayette	One-quadrant interchange
Mississippi	Jefferson		20	32	Mud Island	
Mississippi	Jefferson		23	37	North Fork Coles Creek	
Mississippi	Jefferson		27	43	Coonbox	
Mississippi	Jefferson		30	48	MS 552 – Windsor Ruins, Lorman, Alcorn State University	Two-quadrant interchange
Mississippi	Claiborne		37	60	US 61 – Port Gibson	One-quadrant interchange
Mississippi	Claiborne		39	63	Port Gibson District Office	
Mississippi	Claiborne		41	66	MS 18 – Port Gibson, Utica, Grand Gulf Military State Park	One-quadrant interchange
Mississippi	Claiborne		41	66	Sunken Trace	
Mississippi	Claiborne		45	72	Grindstone Ford and Mangum Mound	
Mississippi	Claiborne		52	84	Owens Creek Waterfall	
Mississippi	Claiborne		54	87	Rocky Springs	
Mississippi	Claiborne		59	95	Fisher Ferry Road – Utica	One-quadrant interchange
Mississippi	Claiborne		61	98	Lower Choctaw Boundary	
Mississippi	Hinds		66	106	MS 27 – Utica, Vicksburg	One-quadrant interchange
Mississippi	Hinds		73	117	Dean Stand Site	
Mississippi	Hinds		78	126	Battle of Raymond	
Mississippi	Hinds		78	126	MS 467 – Raymond, Edwards	One-quadrant interchange
Mississippi	Hinds		82	132	Airport Road – John Bell Williams Airport	
Mississippi	Hinds		86	138	Clinton Pullout	
Mississippi	Hinds	Clinton	86– 87	138– 140	I-20 – Vicksburg, Clinton, Jackson	Partial cloverleaf interchange; I-20 exit 34
Mississippi	Hinds	Clinton	87	140	Cowles Mead Cemetery	
Mississippi	Hinds	Clinton	88	142	Pinehaven Drive – City of Clinton Visitor Center	One-quadrant interchange
Mississippi	Hinds	Clinton	89	143	Ridgeland Pullout	
Mississippi	Hinds	Jackson	92– 93	148– 150	US 49 – Flora, Jackson	Partial cloverleaf interchange
Mississippi	Hinds	Jackson	93	150	Osburn Stand	
Mississippi	Madison	Ridgeland	100	160	Choctaw Agency	
Mississippi	Madison	Ridgeland	101	163	I-55 – Madison, Jackson	Partial cloverleaf interchange; I-55 exit 105A
Mississippi	Madison	Ridgeland	102	164	US 51 – Parkway Information Cabin	One-quadrant interchange
Mississippi	Madison	Ridgeland	102	164	Ridgeland District Office	
Mississippi	Madison	Ridgeland	103	166	Old Canton Road – Madison, Ridgeland, Bruce Campbell Field	Partial cloverleaf interchange
Mississippi	Madison	Ridgeland	104	167	Old Trace and Brashears Stand Site	
Mississippi	Madison		105	169	Reservoir Overlook	
Mississippi	Madison		106	171	Boyd site	
Mississippi	Madison		107	172	West Florida Boundary	
Mississippi	Madison		114– 115	183– 185	MS 43 – Canton, Pelahatchie, Ross Barnett Reservoir	Two-quadrant interchange
Mississippi	Madison		122	196	Cypress Swamp	
Mississippi	Madison		122	196	River Bend	
Mississippi	Madison		128	206	Upper Choctaw Boundary	
Mississippi	Madison		130	210	Yockanookany	
Mississippi	Leake		134– 135	216– 217	MS 16 – Canton, Carthage	Two-quadrant interchange
Mississippi	Leake		135	217	Robinson Road	
Mississippi	Leake		140	230	Red Dog Road	
Mississippi	Leake		145	233	Myrick Creek	
Mississippi	Leake		146	235	MS 429 – Thomastown	At-grade intersection
Mississippi	Attala		154	248	Holly Hill	
Mississippi	Attala		159	256	Kosciusko District Office	
Mississippi	Attala		159– 160	256– 260	MS 19 – Kosciusko, Carthage	Two-quadrant interchange
Mississippi	Attala		159– 160	256– 260	Kosciusko Welcome Center	
Mississippi	Attala		164	264	Hurricane Creek	
Mississippi	Attala		165	266	MS 12 – Ethel, Kosciusko	Two-quadrant interchange
Mississippi	Attala		169	272	CR 2247 to CR 2101	One-quadrant interchange
Mississippi	Attala		175	282	Cole Creek	
Mississippi	Attala		176	283	Bethel Mission	
Mississippi	Choctaw	French Camp	180	290	French Camp South	
Mississippi	Choctaw	French Camp	180	290	MS 413 to MS 407	At-grade intersection
Mississippi	Choctaw	French Camp	180	290	French Camp	
Mississippi	Choctaw	French Camp	181	291	French Camp North	
Mississippi	Choctaw		189	304	Byway Overlook	
Mississippi	Choctaw		190	310	MS 415	Northern terminus of MS 415
Mississippi	Choctaw		193	311	Jeff Busby	
Mississippi	Choctaw		195	314	MS 9 – Choctaw Lake Recreation Area, Eupora, Ackerman	One-quadrant interchange
Mississippi	Choctaw		198	319	Old Trace	
Mississippi	Choctaw		201	323	Ballard Creek	
Mississippi	Choctaw		203	327	Pigeon Roost	
Mississippi	Webster		204	328	US 82 – Eupora, Mathiston	Partial cloverleaf interchange
Mississippi	Webster		210	340	MS 765 to MS 50	Western terminus of MS 765
Mississippi	Webster		213	343	Line Creek	
Mississippi	Webster		214	344	MS 15 – Maben, Houston	One-quadrant interchange
Mississippi	Webster		214	344	Dancy District Office	
Mississippi	Clay		219	352	MS 46 – Mantee, Montpelier	One-quadrant interchange
Mississippi	Chickasaw		221	356	Old Trace	
Mississippi	Chickasaw		226	364	MS 389 – Houston, Montpelier	One-quadrant interchange
Mississippi	Chickasaw		229	369	MS 8 – Houston, Aberdeen	One-quadrant interchange
Mississippi	Chickasaw		232	373	Bynum Mounds	
Mississippi	Chickasaw		233	375	Witch Dance	
Mississippi	Chickasaw		235	378	Old Fossils	
Mississippi	Chickasaw		239	385	MS 32 – Houston, Okolona	One-quadrant interchange
Mississippi	Chickasaw		241	388	Chickasaw Agency	
Mississippi	Chickasaw		243	391	CR 413 – Owl Creek Mounds	One-quadrant interchange
Mississippi	Chickasaw		243	391	Hernando de Soto	
Mississippi	Chickasaw		245	394	Monroe Mission	
Mississippi	Pontotoc		246	396	MS 41 – Pontotoc, Okolona	One-quadrant interchange
Mississippi	Pontotoc		249	401	Tockshish	
Mississippi	Pontotoc		251	404	Chickasaw Council House	
Mississippi	Lee		251	404	Pontocola Road – Pontotoc, Shannon	One-quadrant interchange
Mississippi	Lee		252	406	Black Belt Overlook	
Mississippi	Lee		255	410	Palmetto Road – Pontotoc, Verona	One-quadrant interchange
Mississippi	Lee		256	412	US 278 / MS 6	Partial cloverleaf interchange
Mississippi	Lee	Tupelo	258	415	Cliff Gookin Boulevard – Tupelo High School	Two-quadrant interchange
Mississippi	Lee	Tupelo	259– 260	417– 420	Main Street – Tupelo, Pontotoc, Tupelo National Battlefield	Two-quadrant interchange
Mississippi	Lee	Tupelo	261	420	Chickasaw Village Site	
Mississippi	Lee	Tupelo	262	422	MS 178 (McCullough Boulevard) – Elvis Presley Birthplace	Two-quadrant interchange
Mississippi	Lee	Tupelo	263	423	I-22 / US 78 – Tupelo, Fulton, New Albany, Tombigbee State Park, Elvis Presley Lake	Partial cloverleaf interchange; I-22 exit 85
Mississippi	Lee	Tupelo	263	423	Old Town Overlook	
Mississippi	Lee		265– 266	426– 428	Parkway Visitor Center	
Mississippi	Lee		266	428	MS 145 – Tupelo, Corinth	Two-quadrant interchange
Mississippi	Lee		269	433	Old Trace and Confederate Gravesites	
Mississippi	Lee		270	430	MS 363 – Saltillo, Mantachie	Two-quadrant intersection
Mississippi	Lee		275	443	Dogwood Valley	
Mississippi	Lee		275– 276	443– 444	Friendship Road	One-quadrant interchange
Mississippi	Lee		278	447	Twentymile Bottom Overlook	
Mississippi	Itawamba		281– 282	452– 454	MS 371 to MS 370 – Marietta, Mantachie, Baldwyn	Two-quadrant interchange
Mississippi	Itawamba		283	455	Donivan Slough	
Mississippi	Prentiss		286	460	Browns Bottom	
Mississippi	Prentiss		286	460	Pharr Mounds	
Mississippi	Prentiss		288	463	Siloam Road – Whitten Lock and Dam, Bay Springs Lake	Partial cloverleaf interchange
Mississippi	Tennessee–Tombigbee Waterway		292	470	Jamie L. Whitten Bridge	
Mississippi	Tishomingo		293	472	Tenn–Tom Waterway	
Mississippi	Tishomingo		293	472	CR 1 to MS 4 – Fulton, Bay Springs Lake	One-quadrant interchange
Mississippi	Tishomingo		295	475	Jourdan Creek	
Mississippi	Tishomingo		297	478	MS 4 – Belmont, Booneville, Bay Springs Lake	One-quadrant interchange
Mississippi	Tishomingo		300	480	McDougal	
Mississippi	Tishomingo		302– 303	486– 488	MS 25 – Tishomingo, Belmont	Two-quadrant interchange
Mississippi	Tishomingo		303	488	CR 90 – Tishomingo State Park	One-quadrant interchange
Mississippi	Tishomingo		307	494	MS 30 – Booneville	One-quadrant interchange
Mississippi	Tishomingo		308	496	Cave Spring	
Mississippi	Tishomingo		308	496	Bear Creek Mound	
Alabama	Colbert		309	497	CR 1 (Allsboro Road)	One-quadrant interchange
Alabama	Colbert		311	501	Rock Creek	
Alabama	Colbert		312	502	Bear Creek	
Alabama	Colbert		316	509	Freedom Hills Overlook	
Alabama	Colbert		320	510	US 72 – Cherokee, Iuka	One-quadrant interchange
Alabama	Colbert		320	510	Buzzard Roost Spring	
Alabama	Colbert		323	520	Sinkhole	
Alabama	Colbert		326	525	CR 21 (North Pike) – Cherokee	One-quadrant interchange
Alabama	Colbert		327	526	Colbert Ferry	
Alabama	Tennessee River		327– 328	526– 528	John Coffee Memorial Bridge	
Alabama	Lauderdale		328	528	Lauderdale	
Alabama	Lauderdale		329	529	CR 2	One-quadrant interchange
Alabama	Lauderdale		330	530	Rock Spring	
Alabama	Lauderdale		331	533	CR 14 – Florence, Waterloo	One-quadrant interchange
Alabama	Lauderdale		336	541	SR 20 – Florence	One-quadrant interchange
Tennessee	Wayne		343	552	Cypress Creek	
Tennessee	Wayne		346	557	Holly	
Tennessee	Wayne		350	560	Sunken Trace	
Tennessee	Wayne		350	560	SR 13 – Florence, AL	One-quadrant interchange
Tennessee	Wayne		352	566	McGlamery Stand	
Tennessee	Wayne	Collinwood	354	570	Broadway Street – Wayne County Welcome Center	One-quadrant interchange
Tennessee	Wayne		363	584	Sweetwater Branch	
Tennessee	Wayne		364	586	Glenrock Branch	
Tennessee	Wayne		365	587	Upper Glenrock Branch	
Tennessee	Wayne		367	591	Dogwood Mudhole	
Tennessee	Wayne		369– 370	594– 600	US 64 – Lawrenceburg, Waynesboro, David Crockett State Park	Partial cloverleaf interchange
Tennessee	Wayne		369– 370	594– 600	Trail of Tears Bell Route	
Tennessee	Lawrence		372	599	Brush Creek Road – Laurel Hill Lake	One-quadrant interchange
Tennessee	Lawrence		375	604	Old Trace Drive	
Tennessee	Lewis		377	607	Jacks Branch Road	One-quadrant interchange
Tennessee	Lewis		377	607	Jacks Branch	
Tennessee	Lewis		380	610	SR 241 (Napier Road)	One-quadrant interchange
Tennessee	Lewis		381	613	Napier Mine	
Tennessee	Lewis		382	615	Metal Ford	
Tennessee	Lewis		385	620	SR 20 (Summertown Highway) – Hohenwald, Summertown	One-quadrant interchange
Tennessee	Lewis		385	620	Meriwether Lewis, near Grinder's Stand	
Tennessee	Lewis		386	621	English Creek Cascade	
Tennessee	Lewis		390	630	Phosphate Mine	
Tennessee	Lewis		391	629	US 412 (Columbia Highway) – Columbia, Hohenwald	One-quadrant interchange
Tennessee	Lewis		391	629	Fall Hollow	
Tennessee	Lewis		392	631	Swan View Overlook	
Tennessee	Lewis		394	634	Devil's Backbone State Natural Area	
Tennessee	Lewis		397	639	Old Trace	
Tennessee	Hickman		400	640	Sheboss Place	
Tennessee	Maury		401	645	Tobacco Farm and Old Trace	
Tennessee	Hickman		403	649	Old Track Walk	
Tennessee	Hickman		404	650	Jackson Falls	
Tennessee	Hickman		405	652	Baker Bluff Overlook	
Tennessee	Maury		407	655	Gordon House	
Tennessee	Hickman		407	655	SR 50 – Columbia, Centerville	One-quadrant interchange
Tennessee	Maury		411	661	Water Valley Overlook	
Tennessee	Maury		415	668	SR 7 – Columbia, Dickson	One-quadrant interchange
Tennessee	Williamson		423	681	Tennessee Valley Divide	
Tennessee	Williamson		425	684	Burns Branch	
Tennessee	Williamson		426	686	War of 1812	
Tennessee	Williamson		427	687	Garrison Creek	
Tennessee	Williamson		428	689	SR 46 – Leiper's Fork	One-quadrant interchange
Tennessee	Williamson		435	700	Carroll	
Tennessee	Williamson		437	703	Timberland Park	
Tennessee	Williamson		437	703	SR 96 – Franklin	One-quadrant interchange
Tennessee	Williamson		437– 438	703– 705	Natchez Trace Parkway Bridge	
Tennessee	Williamson		438	705	Birdsong Hollow	
Tennessee	Williamson		439	707	Bending Chestnut Overlook	
Tennessee	Williamson		442	711	SR 100 to I-40	Northern terminus
1.000 mi = 1.609 km; 1.000 km = 0.621 mi

== Gallery ==
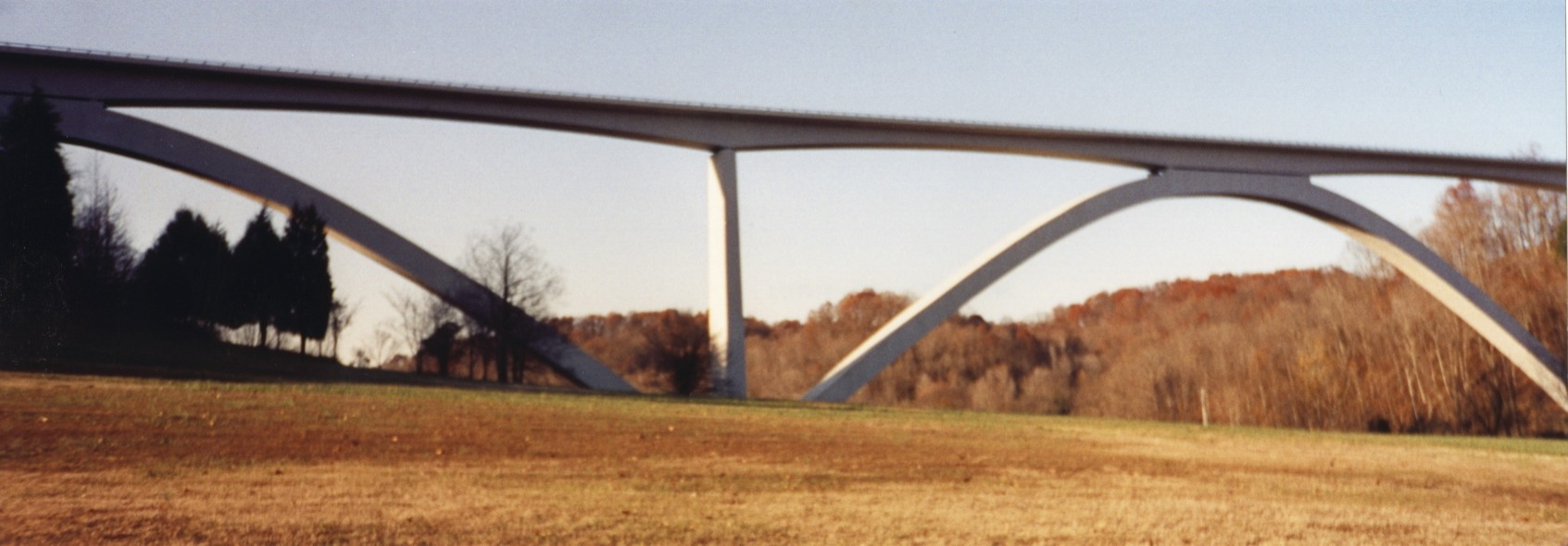
Natchez Trace Parkway Bridge over SR 96 in Tennessee

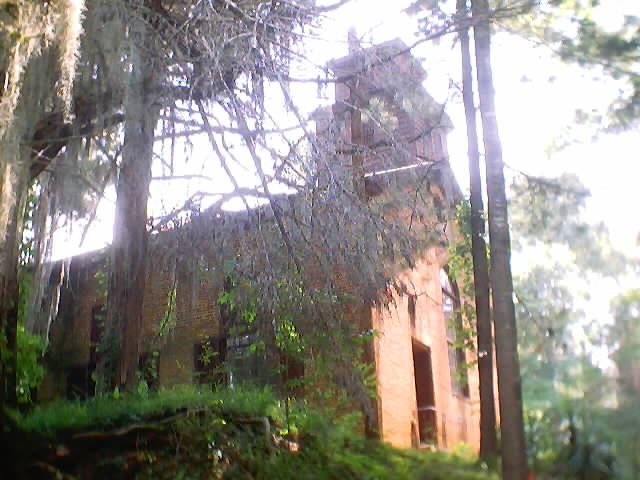
Rocky Springs Methodist Church

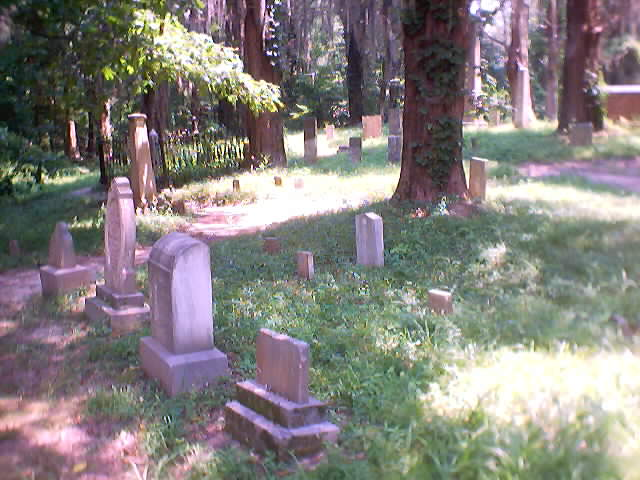
Rocky Springs Cemetery

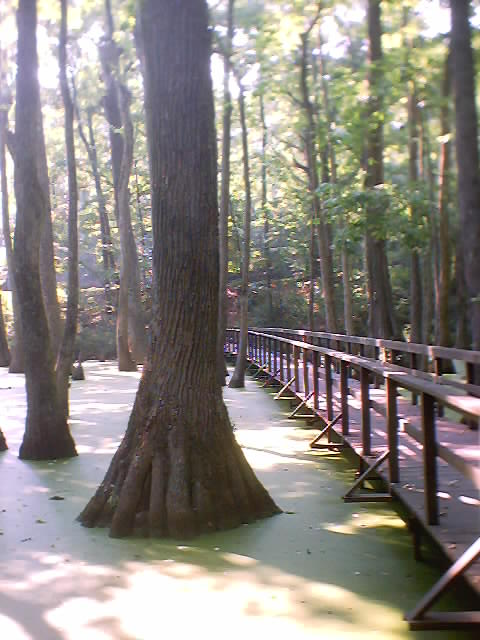
Cypress Swamp

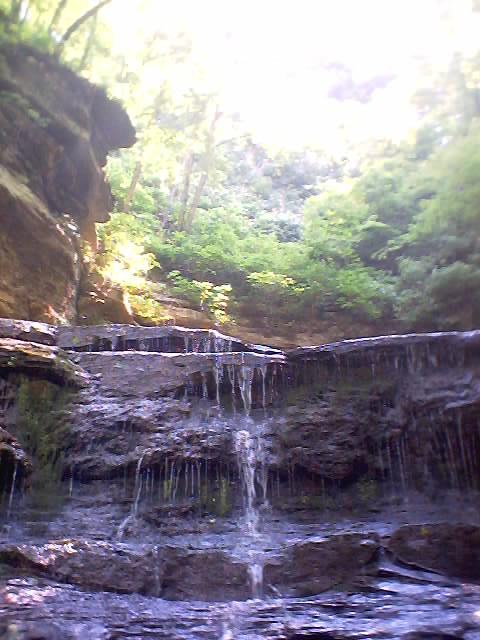
Scenic waterfall

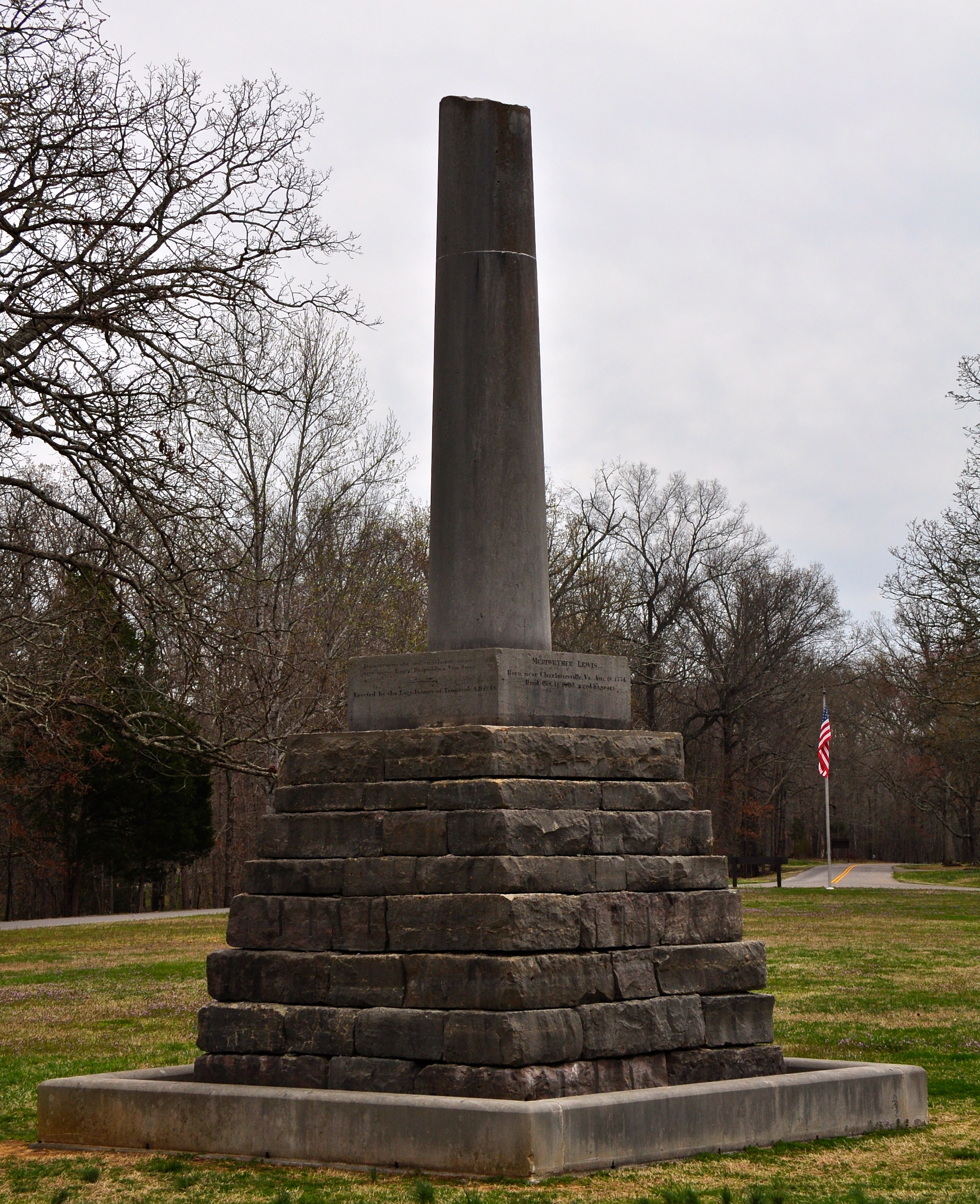
Meriwether Lewis National Monument and gravesite at Grinder's Stand

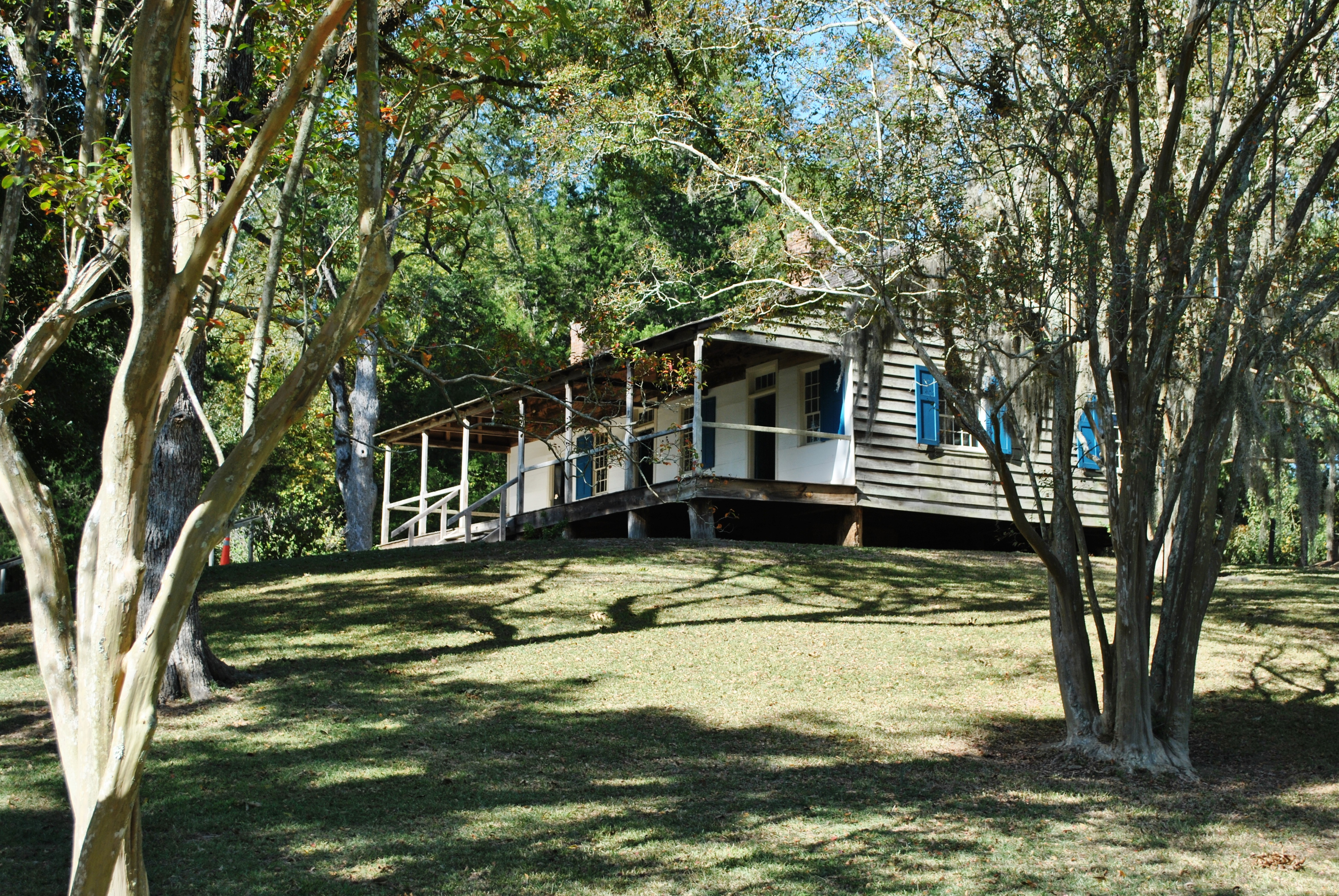
Mount Locust

== See also ==
- Blue Ridge Parkway
