= Crooks Mound =

- Location within Louisiana today
- 31°31′28.16″N 92°1′2.21″W
- Periods: Woodland period
- Cultures: Marksville culture
- Location: Jonesville, Louisiana, La Salle Parish, Louisiana, USA
- Region: La Salle Parish, Louisiana

History
- Built: 100 BCE
- Abandoned: 400 CE

Site notes
- Architectural style: Burial mound
- Excavation dates: 1938–1939,
- Archaeologists: James A. Ford

Crooks Mound (French: Monticule d'Escrocs) (16 LA 3) is a large Marksville culture archaeological site located in La Salle Parish in south central Louisiana. It is a large, conical burial mound that was part of at least six episodes of burials. It measured about 16 ft high (4.9 m) and 85 ft wide (26 m). It contained roughly 1,150 sets of remains that were placed. However, they were able to be fit into the structure of the mound. Sometimes body parts were removed in order to achieve that goal. Archaeologists think it was a holding house for the area that was emptied periodically in order to achieve this type of setup.

Most of the time, the people were just placed into the mound, but a few of the burials were in log-lined tombs or, rarely, stone-lined tombs. Only a few out of each burial were interred with copper tools as grave goods. This suggests that the area was mainly for common people to be buried in.

The site is on private land, usually with no public access, but it can be viewed from the roadway.

== Description ==
There were two separate mounds that make up the site. In 1938–1939 the site was completely excavated under the direction of James A. Ford. The mounds were 1,200 feet (370 m) southeast of French Fork Bayou and 450 feet (140 m) southwest of Cypress Bayou. Mound A was a conical mound that stood 17.8 feet (5.4 m) in height and 85 feet (26 m) in diameter. Mound B is low rectangular mound located 110 feet (34 m) southwest of Mound A. It was originally 3 feet (0.91 m) in height and measured 58 feet (18 m) in its northeast/southwest alignment and 38 feet (12 m) in its northwest/southeast alignment. Excavations revealed that Mound A had been built in three stages; Mound B was a single-stage structure. The mounds held 1,175 burials: 1,159 from Mound A, and 13 from Mound B (3 unknown). Pottery accompanied some burials; the weight of mound fill apparently crushed the vessels. The mounds were used for burials around 100 BCE to 400 CE. No evidence for domestic structures exists on or near the mounds, leading archaeologists to believe they were strictly for mortuary purposes.
