= Tennessee House of Representatives 71st district =

State legislative district in Tennessee

Tennessee's 71st State House of Representatives district
- Map of Tennessee House districts with the 71st District shaded in red
Representative
Kip Capley; R–Summertown
since 2023
- Demographics: 86.1% White; 5.9% Black; 3.6% Hispanic; 0.3% Asian; 3.9% Multiracial
- Population (2024): 75,811

The Tennessee House of Representatives 71st district is one of the 99 legislative districts in the lower house of the Tennessee General Assembly. The district is located in Middle Tennessee and covers all of Wayne, and parts of Hardin, Lawrence, and Maury counties. The district includes Lawrenceburg, Mount Pleasant, Waynesboro, and Clifton. It also stretches west to include part of Savannah. Kip Capley has represented the district since 2023.

== Demographics ==
The Tennessee Comptroller estimates the population as of 2024 at 75,811.

- 86.1% of the district is White
- 5.9% of the district is Black
- 3.6% of the district is Hispanic
- 0.3% of the district is Asian
- 0.2% of the district is some other race alone
- 3.9% of the district is Two or more races

Detailed demographic information is also available through Census Reporter.

== History ==
The 88th Tennessee General Assembly was the first in which all districts were numbered. At this time, the 71st district was in Carroll and Madison counties. From the 89th-92nd, it was composed of Crockett and Madison counties. At the 93rd it was in Hardin, McNairy and Wayne counties. From the 94th-97th it was composed of Hardin and McNairy counties. From the 98th-107th, it was composed of Hardin, McNairy, and part of Decatur counties. From the 108th-112th, it was composed of Hardin, Lewis, Wayne, and part of Lawrence counties. Since the 113th General Assembly, it has been composed of all of Wayne, and parts of Hardin, Lawrence, and Maury counties.

== List of Representatives ==
Representative	Party	Years of Service	General Assembly	Hometown
Kip Capley	Republican	2023-present	113th-114th	Summertown
David Byrd	Republican	2015-2022	109th-112th	Waynesboro
Vance Dennis	Republican	2009-2014	106th-108th	Savannah
Randy Rinks	Democratic	1991-2008	97th-105th	Savannah
Robbie Wolfe	Republican	1989-1990	96th	Savannah
Herman Wolfe Sr.	Republican	1983 - Feb 3, 1989 *	93rd-96th	Savannah
James Wallace Jr.	Independent	1975-1982	89th-92nd	Jackson
Lucas Taylor	Republican	1973-1974	88th	Huntingdon

- Herman Wolfe Sr. died in office, Robbie Wolfe was elected to fulfill the remainder of his term.
