= Kimmins, Tennessee =

- Unincorporated community
- Location in Tennessee Location in the United States
- Coordinates: 35°37′13″N 87°32′16″W
- Country: United States
- State: Tennessee
- County: Lewis
- Elevation: 951 ft (290 m)
- Time zone: UTC-6 (Central (CST))
  - Summer (DST): UTC-5 (CDT)
- GNIS feature ID: 1307351

Kimmins is an unincorporated community in northern Lewis County, Tennessee. It lies along local roads north of the city of Hohenwald, the county seat of Lewis County. Its elevation is 951 feet (290 m).
