= Lewis County High School (Tennessee) =

Location
- 818 West Main Street; Hohenwald, Tennessee; 38462; United States
- Coordinates: 35.5489°N 87.5749°W

Information
- School district: Lewis County Schools
- Director: Benny L. Pace
- Principal: Stacey Graves
- Grades: 9–12
- Enrollment: 481 (2024-2025)
- Colors: Black; Gold
- Mascot: Panthers
- Website: School website

Lewis County High School is located in Hohenwald, Tennessee. The mascot of the school is the Panther. It's located in the Lewis County School district, and it is the only high school in Lewis County.

== Athletics ==
The school offers baseball/softball, basketball, cheerleading, football, golf, soccer, tennis, and volleyball. Lewis County compete as the Panthers and Lady Panthers and in TSSAA's middle grand division, district 6.

Team State Titles
Year	Sport	Class	Award	Details
1962	Boys' Golf		Champions	
1999	Girls' Golf	A-AA	Runner-Up	

Individual State Titles
Year	Sport	Class	Award	Details / Name
1999	Girls' Golf	A-AA	Runner-Up	Melissa Kinnard
