= Fort Pickering (Memphis, Tennessee) =

- Memphis, Tennessee

Location
- Location within Tennessee Location within the United States
- Coordinates: 35.122104°N 90.074132°W

Site history
- Built: c.1801 (frontier fort); 1861 (Civil War fort)
- In use: c.1801 to 1814 (frontier fort); 1861 to 1866 (Civil War fort)

Garrison information
- Garrison: Strategic Command Post

Fort Pickering was a frontier fort on the Fourth Chickasaw Bluff in Memphis, Tennessee, constructed by the United States, and a later fortification constructed by the Confederate States Army at the same site during the American Civil War. After the First Battle of Memphis, the fort was expanded by the Union Army to provide control of the Mississippi River south of the city.

Fort Pickering Memphis Tennessee

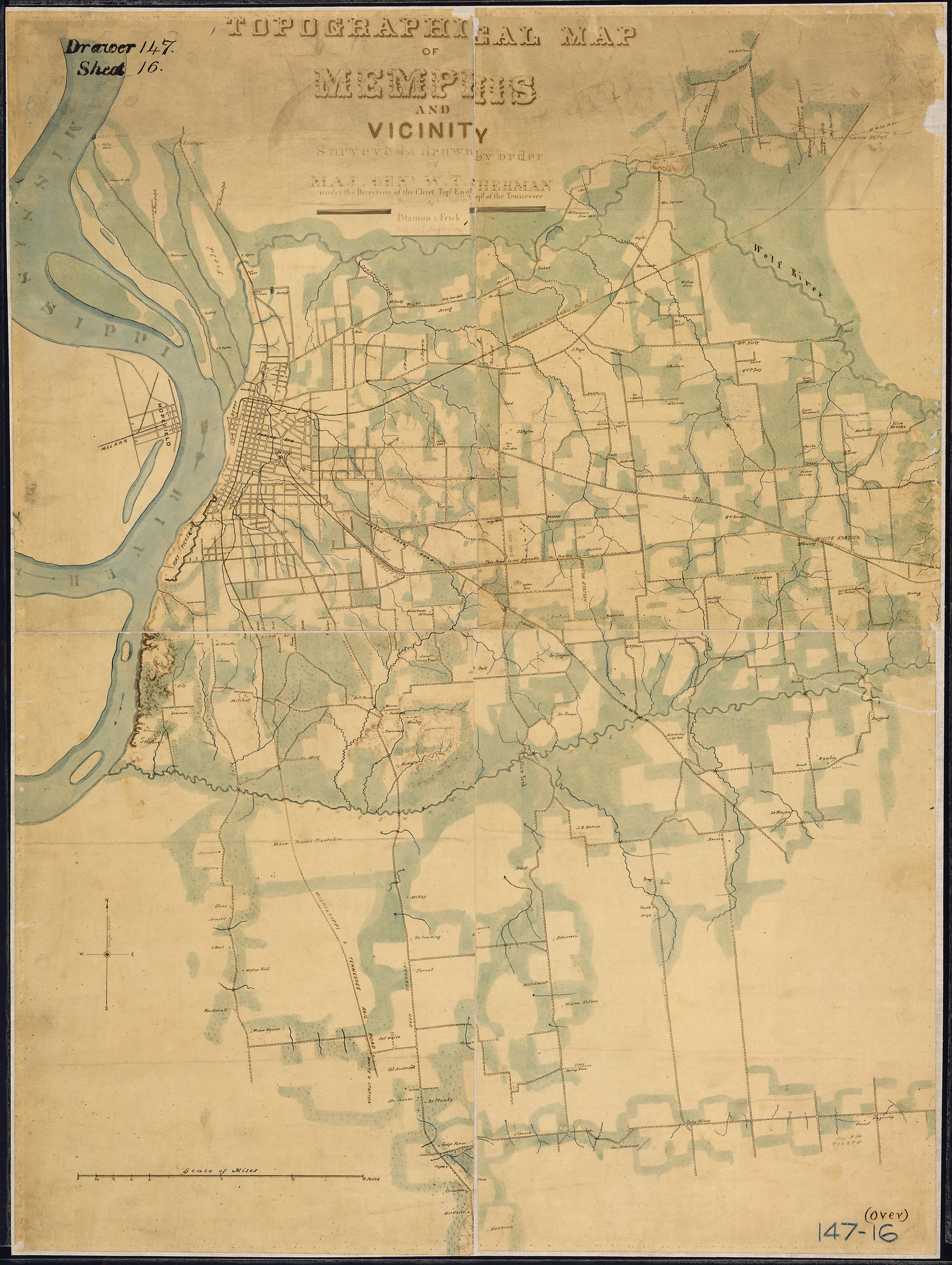
Topographical Map of Memphis and Vicinity. Surveyed & drawn by order of Maj. Genl. W. T. Sherman.

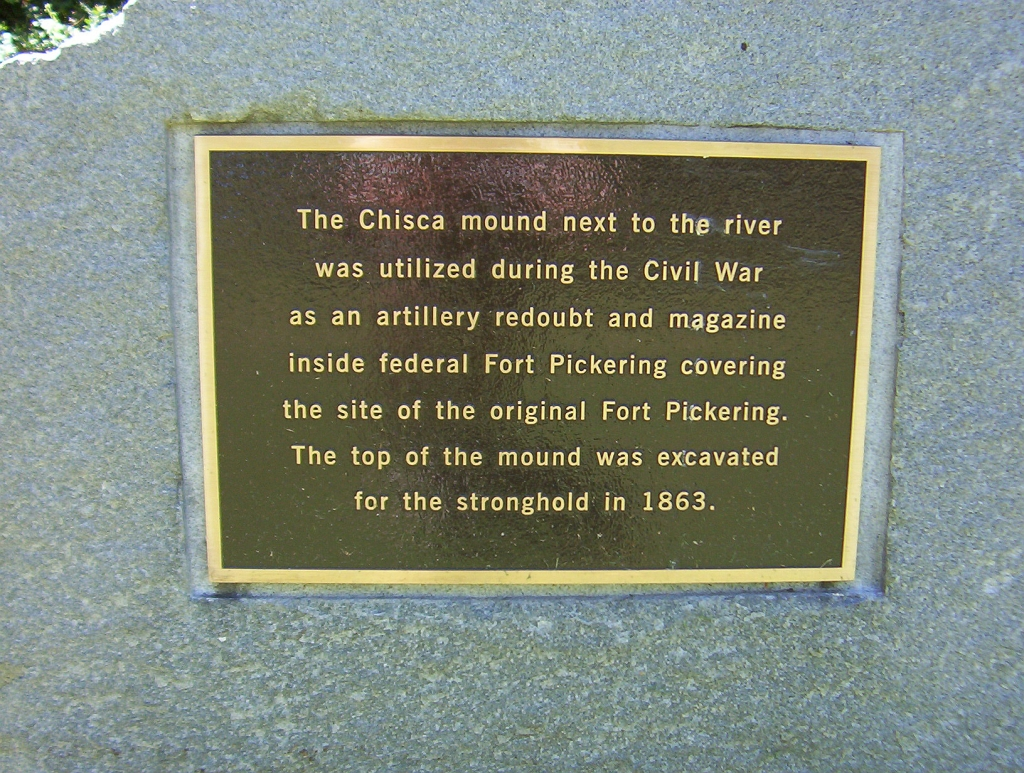
Plaque for Fort Pickering

== History ==
=== Frontier fort (c.1801–1814) ===
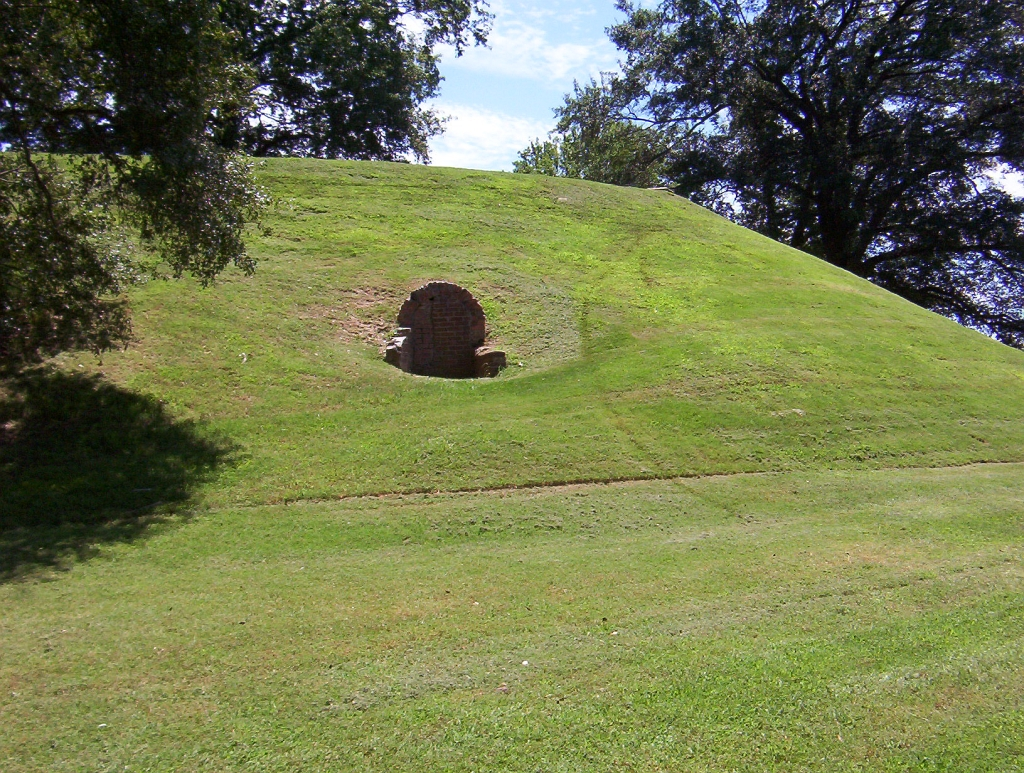
Mound bunker entrance

The Memphis bluffs were home to a number of military fortifications, including French Fort Assumption (built by French colonists and militia in 1739), Spanish Fort Fernando de las Barrancas, and early American Fort Adams.

Around 1801, Fort Adams was abandoned, and Fort Pickering was constructed on higher ground near two Mississippian-period earthwork mounds. The fort was named for secretary of state Timothy Pickering. By 1806, the fort had lost its strategic importance, but continued operations as a small frontier station and trading post. In 1808, Zachary Taylor, who would later become president of the United States, was granted command of the fort as his first military commission.

A small town grew up around the fort and was later incorporated into Memphis during a period of rapid growth in the mid-1800s.

==== Meriwether Lewis at Fort Pickering ====
On September 4, 1809, Meriwether Lewis, now the Governor of the Upper Louisiana Territory, left St. Louis for Washington, D.C. He traveled to Fort Pickering by boat, intending to proceed down the Mississippi River to New Orleans and then Washington, D.C., by ship. Lewis arrived at Fort Pickering on September 15, and commanding officer Captain Gilbert C. Russell immediately realized that the governor was ill and mentally unstable. He placed Lewis under house arrest, put him under the care of the surgeon’s mate W.C. Smith, and installed Lewis in his own quarters. After several days, Lewis's condition improved, and he was allowed to travel again. However, rumors of war with Britain, and, possibly, the thought of his journals from the Corps of Discovery falling into British hands, changed his travel plans. On September 29, he left Fort Pickering, taking an overland route. Twelve days later, on October 11, Lewis was found dead at Grinder's Stand on the Natchez Trace.

=== Civil War (1861–1866) ===
During the American Civil War, the Confederate States Army built Fort Pickering on the site. The Confederates dug out the top of the mound and placed artillery there. An ammunition bunker was dug into the side of the mound.

Union forces captured Memphis in June 1862. The Union army enlarged and expanded several areas of the fort. "The newly constructed fort stretched nearly two miles along the south Memphis bluffs from where DeSoto Park (Chickasaw Heritage Park) is located, all the way to Beale Street. It was outfitted with 55 guns and included structures needed to serve the large number of troops living in Memphis and those passing through. The Indian mounds were hollowed out and artillery was placed there, along with an ammunition bunker which was dug into the side of the mound. Buildings included a hospital, rail depot, water works, and a saw mill."

However, Fort Pickering's defenses were never put to the test and Union forces held Memphis throughout the war. The fort served as a major Union staging area during the Vicksburg Campaign.

== Status ==
After Fort Pickering was demolished in 1866, all traces of the fort were removed. The former fort site is now located within the Chickasaw Heritage Park. Archeological surveys began in 2007 to determine the location of the Civil War fort. Trenches were excavated and archaeologists were able to identify two cisterns, brick foundation piers, and particularly, evidence of the defensive parapet and ditch.
