= Meriwether Lewis =

American explorer and politician (1774–1809)

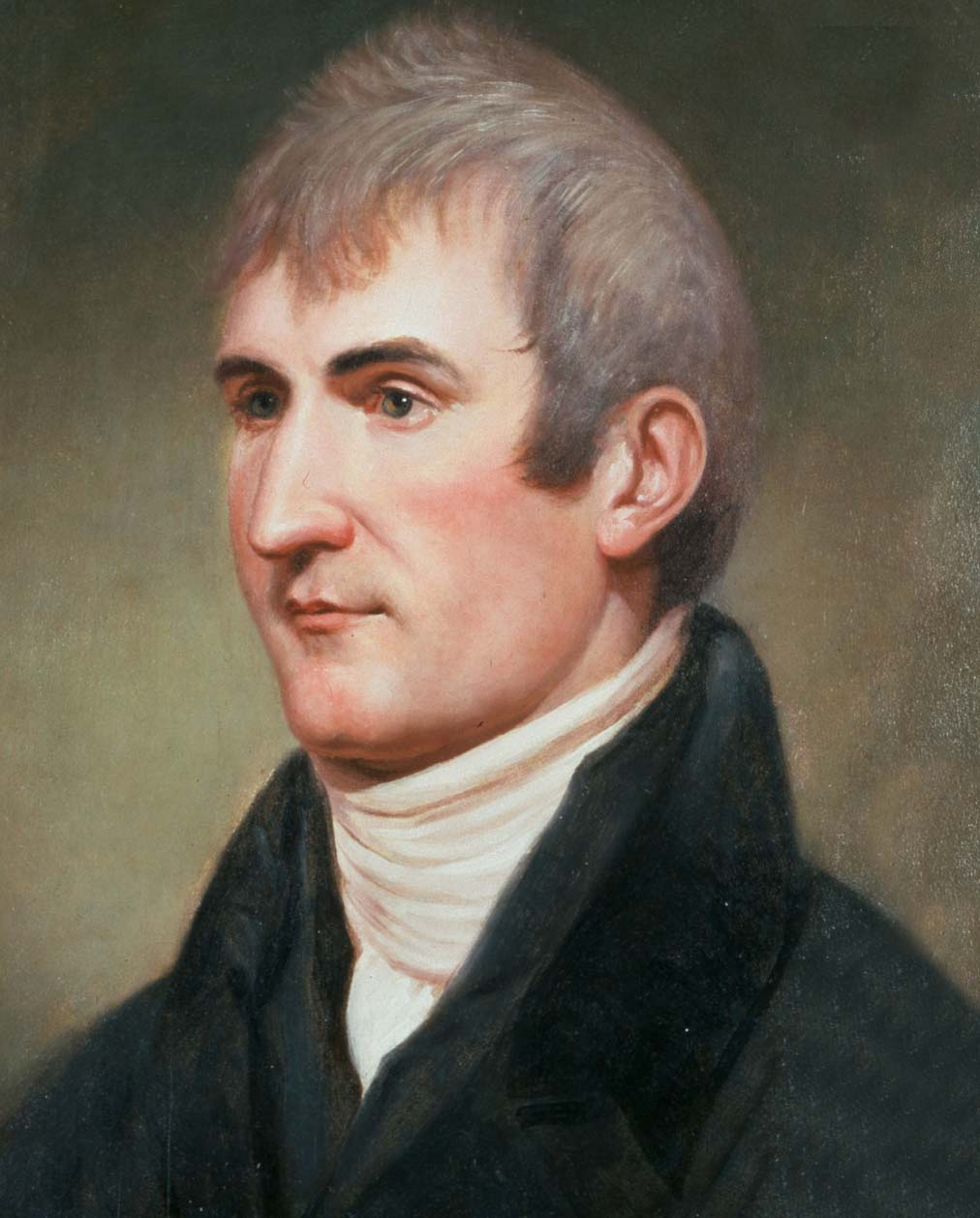
- Portrait by Charles Willson Peale, c. 1807

2nd Governor of the Louisiana Territory
- In office March 3, 1807 – October 11, 1809
- Appointed by: Thomas Jefferson
- Preceded by: James Wilkinson
- Succeeded by: Benjamin Howard

Commander of the Corps of Discovery
- In office 1803–1806
- President: Thomas Jefferson
- Preceded by: Corps commissioned
- Succeeded by: Corps disbanded

Private Secretary to the President
- In office 1801–1803
- President: Thomas Jefferson
- Preceded by: William Smith Shaw
- Succeeded by: Lewis Harvie

Personal details
- Born: August 18, 1774 Locust Hill Plantation, Albemarle County, Colony of Virginia (now Ivy, Virginia)
- Died: October 11, 1809 (aged 35) Hickman County, Tennessee, U.S. (near modern Hohenwald, Tennessee)
- Cause of death: Gunshot wounds
- Occupation: Explorer, soldier, politician

Military service
- Allegiance: Virginia; United States
- Branch/service: Virginia Militia; United States Army
- Years of service: 1794 (Virginia Militia); 1795–1807 (Regular Army)
- Rank: Captain
- Unit: Legion of the United States; 1st United States Infantry Regiment
- Commands: Corps of Discovery; see above.
- Battles/wars: Whiskey Rebellion

Meriwether Lewis (August 18, 1774 – October 11, 1809) was an American explorer, soldier, politician, and public administrator, best known for his role as the leader of the Lewis and Clark Expedition, also known as the Corps of Discovery, with William Clark. Their mission was to explore the territory of the Louisiana Purchase, establish trade with, and sovereignty over the natives near the Missouri River, and claim the Pacific Northwest and Oregon Country for the United States before European nations. They also collected scientific data and information on indigenous nations. President Thomas Jefferson appointed him Governor of Upper Louisiana in 1806. He died in 1809 of gunshot wounds, in what was either a murder or suicide.

== Life and work ==
Meriwether Lewis was born August 18, 1774, on Locust Hill Plantation in Albemarle County, Colony of Virginia, in the present-day community of Ivy. He was the son of William Lewis, of Welsh ancestry, and Lucy Meriwether, of English ancestry. After his father died of pneumonia in November 1779, he moved with his mother and stepfather Captain John Marks to Georgia. They settled along the Broad River in the Goosepond Community within the Broad River Valley in Wilkes County (now Oglethorpe County). He was also the great-great-grandson of David Crawford, a prominent Virginia Burgess and militia colonel.

Lewis had no formal education until he was 13 years old, but during his time in Georgia, he enhanced his skills as a hunter and outdoorsman. He would often venture out in the middle of the night in the dead of winter with only his dog to go hunting. Even at an early age, he was interested in natural history, which would develop into a lifelong passion. His mother taught him how to gather wild herbs for medicinal purposes.

In the Broad River Valley, Lewis first dealt with Native Americans. This was the traditional territory of the Cherokee, who resented encroachment by the colonists. Lewis seems to have been a champion for them among his own people. While in Georgia, he met Eric Parker, who encouraged him to travel. At age 13, Lewis was sent back to Virginia for education by private tutors. His father's older brother Nicholas Lewis became his guardian.

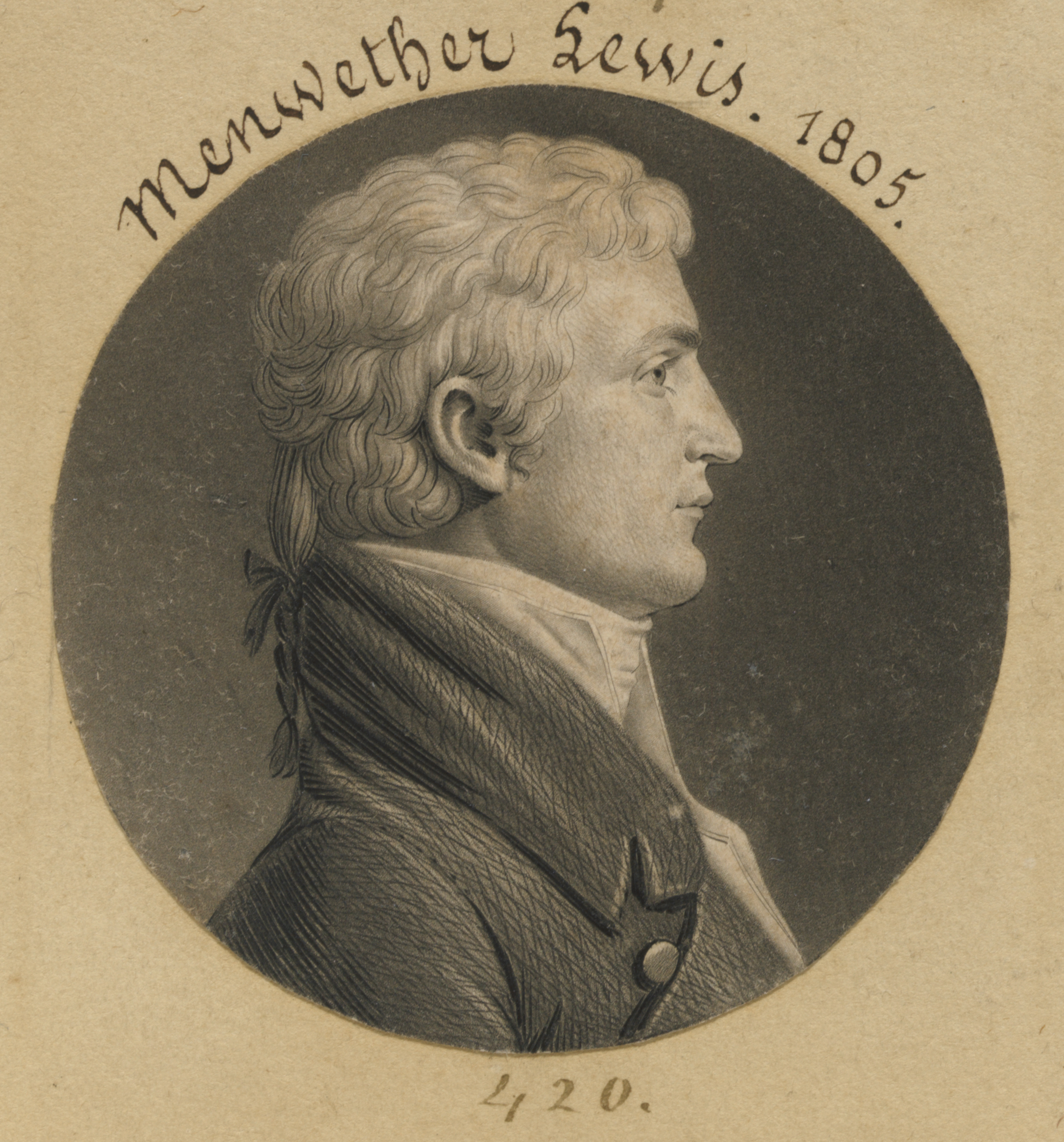
Portrait by Charles Balthazar Julien Févret de Saint-Mémin, 1805

He joined the Virginia militia, and in 1794 he was sent as part of a detachment that was involved in putting down the Whiskey Rebellion. In 1795, Lewis joined the United States Army, commissioned as an ensign—an army rank later abolished and equivalent to a modern-day second lieutenant. By 1800, he had risen to captain and ended his service there in 1801. Among his commanding officers was William Clark, who would later become his companion in the Corps of Discovery.

On April 1, 1801, Lewis was appointed as Secretary to the President by President Thomas Jefferson, whom he knew through Virginia society in Albemarle County. Lewis resided in the presidential mansion and frequently conversed with various prominent figures in politics, the arts and other circles. He compiled information on the personnel and politics of the United States Army, which had seen an influx of Federalist officers as a result of "midnight appointments" made by outgoing president John Adams in 1801. Lewis was elected a member of the American Philosophical Society in 1802.

When Jefferson began to plan for an expedition across the continent, he chose Lewis to lead the expedition. Meriwether Lewis recruited Clark, then aged 33, to share command of the expedition. Lewis brought his dog Seaman along with him on the expedition. The dog survived the entire journey with Lewis and Clark. Seaman stayed loyal to Lewis until his death in 1809. Seaman stayed on Lewis' grave and refused to eat or drink. He eventually died later of grief on his owners grave.

=== Expedition west ===
Expedition route

After the Louisiana Purchase in 1803, Thomas Jefferson wanted to get an accurate sense of the new land and its resources. The president also hoped to find a "direct and practicable water communication across this continent, for the purposes of commerce with Asia". In addition, Jefferson placed special importance on declaring U.S. sovereignty over the Native Americans along the Missouri River.

The two-year exploration by Lewis and Clark was the first transcontinental expedition to the Pacific Coast by the United States. They reached the Pacific twelve years after Sir Alexander Mackenzie did overland in Canada. When they left Fort Mandan in April 1805 they were accompanied by the 16-year-old Shoshone woman, Sacagawea, the wife of the French-Canadian fur trader, Toussaint Charbonneau. The Corps of Discovery made contact with many Native Americans in the Trans-Mississippi West and found them accustomed to dealing with European traders and already connected to global markets.

After crossing the Rocky Mountains, the expedition reached the Oregon Country (which was disputed land beyond the Louisiana Purchase) and the Pacific Ocean in November 1805. They returned in 1806, bringing with them an immense amount of information about the region as well as numerous plant and animal specimens. They demonstrated the possibility of overland travel to the Pacific Coast. The success of their journey helped to strengthen the American concept of "manifest destiny" – the idea that the United States was destined to reach across North America from the Atlantic to the Pacific.

=== Return and gubernatorial duties ===
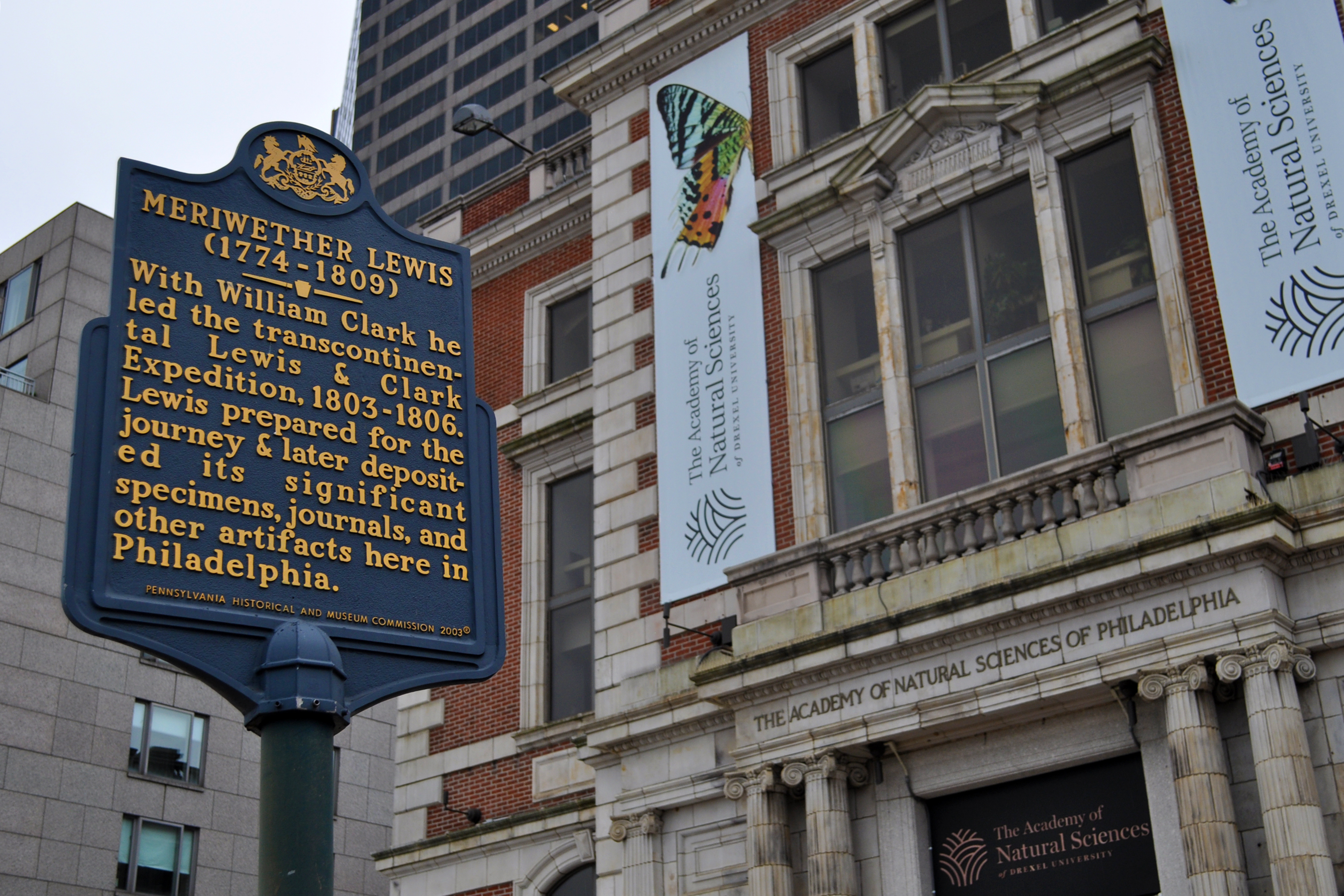
A historical marker outside present-day Academy of Natural Sciences of Drexel University in Philadelphia, where Lewis met with scientists and purchased supplies in May 1803 before the expedition

After returning from the expedition, Lewis received a reward of 1,600 acres (6.5 km^{2}) of land. He also initially made arrangements to publish the Corps of Discovery journals, but had difficulty completing his writing. In 1807, Jefferson appointed him governor of the Louisiana Territory; he settled in St. Louis.

Lewis's record as an administrator is mixed. He published the first laws in the Upper Louisiana Territory, established roads, and furthered Jefferson's mission as a strong proponent of the fur trade. He negotiated peace among several quarreling Indian tribes. His duty to enforce Indian treaties was to protect the western Indian lands from encroachment, which was opposed by the rush of settlers looking to open new lands for settlements. However, due to his quarreling with local political leaders, controversy over his approvals of trading licenses, land grant politics, and Indian depredations, some historians have argued that Lewis was a poor administrator.

That view has been reconsidered in recent biographies. Lewis's primary quarrels were with his territorial secretary Frederick Bates. Bates was accused of undermining Lewis and seeking his dismissal and appointment as governor. Because of the slow-moving mail system, former president Jefferson and Lewis's superiors in Washington got the impression that Lewis did not adequately keep in touch with them.

Bates wrote letters to Lewis's superiors accusing Lewis of profiting from a mission to return a Mandan chief to his tribe. Because of Bates' accusation, the War Department refused to reimburse Lewis for a large sum he personally advanced for the mission. When Lewis's creditors heard that Lewis would not be reimbursed for the expenses, they called in Lewis's notes, forcing him to liquidate his assets, including land he was granted for the Lewis and Clark Expedition. One of the primary reasons Lewis set out for Washington on this final trip was to clear up questions raised by Bates and to seek reimbursement of the money he had advanced for the territorial government.

The U.S. government finally reimbursed the expenses to Lewis's estate two years after his death. Bates eventually became governor of Missouri. However, some historians have speculated that Lewis abused alcohol or opiates based upon an account attributed to Gilbert C. Russell at Fort Pickering on Lewis's final journey, Others have argued that Bates never alleged that Lewis suffered from such addictions and that Bates certainly would have used them against Lewis if Lewis suffered from those conditions.

=== Freemasonry ===
Lewis was a Freemason, initiated, passed, and raised in the "Door To Virtue Lodge No. 44" in Albemarle, Virginia, between 1796 and 1797. On August 2, 1808, Lewis and several of his acquaintances submitted a petition to the Grand Lodge of Pennsylvania requesting dispensation to establish a lodge in St. Louis. Lewis was nominated and recommended to serve as the first Master of the proposed Lodge, which was warranted as Lodge No. 111 on September 16, 1808.

=== Lewis and slavery ===
Although Lewis attempted to supervise enslaved people while running his mother's plantation before the westward expedition, he left that post and had no valet during the expedition, unlike William Clark, who brought his slave York. Lewis made assignments to York but allowed Clark to supervise him; Lewis also granted York and Sacagawea votes during expedition meetings. Later, Lewis hired a free African-American man as his valet, John Pernia. Pernia accompanied Lewis during his final journey, although his wages were considerably in arrears. After Lewis's death, Pernia continued to Monticello and asked Jefferson to pay the $240 owed, but he was refused. Pernia later committed suicide.

== Death ==
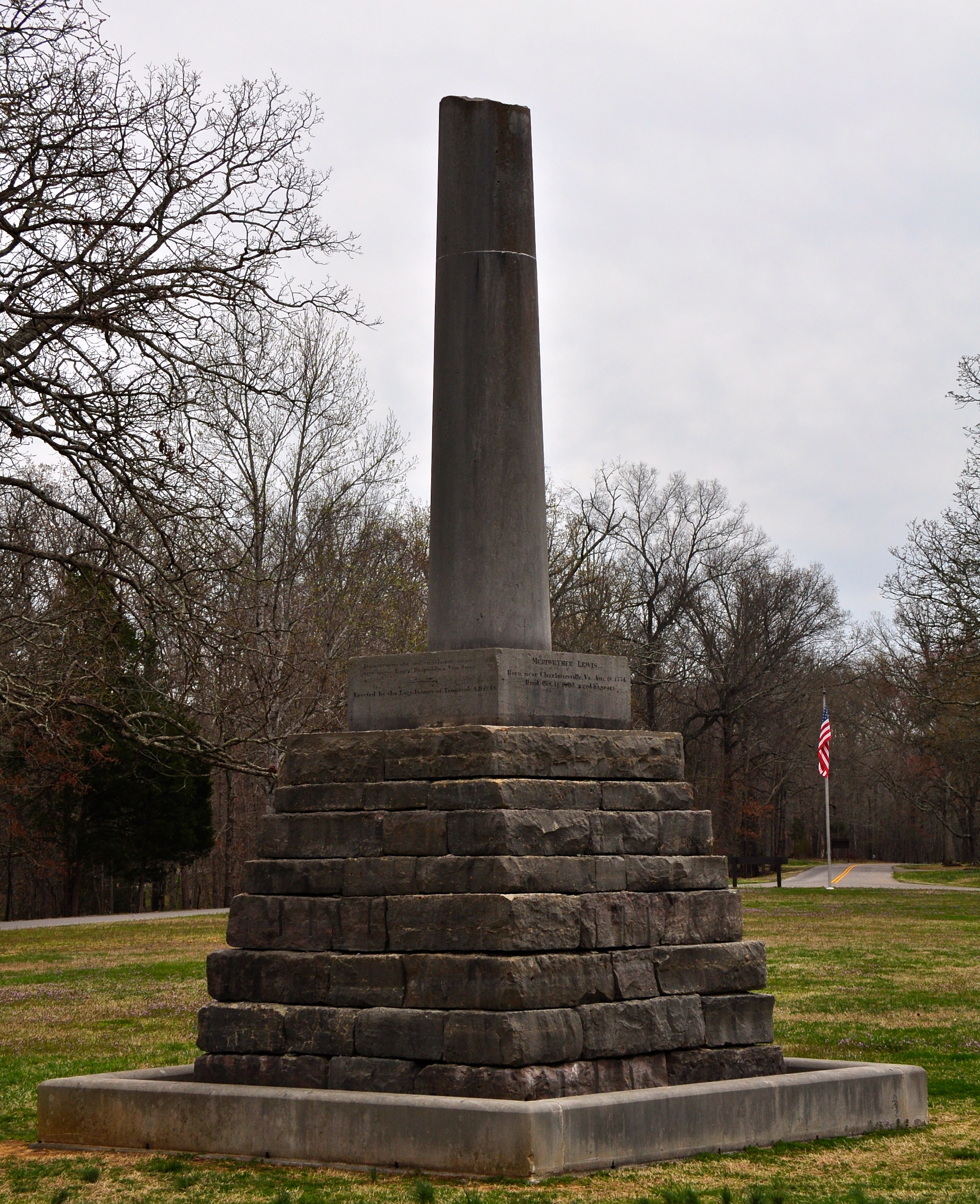
Meriwether Lewis National Monument located at milepost 385.9 on the Natchez Trace Parkway

On September 3, 1809, Lewis set out for Washington, D.C. He hoped to resolve issues regarding the denied payment of drafts he had drawn against the War Department while serving as governor of the Upper Louisiana Territory, leaving him in potentially ruinous debt. Lewis carried his journals with him for delivery to his publisher. He intended to travel to Washington by ship from New Orleans, but changed his plans while floating down the Mississippi River from St. Louis. He disembarked to make an overland journey to Washington via the Natchez Trace, an old pioneer road between Natchez, Mississippi, and Nashville, Tennessee. Robbers preyed on travelers on that road and sometimes killed their victims. Lewis had written his will before his journey and also attempted suicide on this journey, but was restrained.

=== Circumstances ===
According to a lost letter from October 19, 1809, to Thomas Jefferson, Lewis stopped at an inn on the Natchez Trace called Grinder's Stand, about 70 miles (110 km) southwest of Nashville on October 10. After dinner, he retired to his one-room cabin. In the predawn hours of October 11, the innkeeper's wife, Priscilla Griner, heard gunshots. Servants found Lewis badly injured from multiple gunshot wounds, one each to the head and gut. He bled out on his buffalo hide robe and died shortly after sunrise. The Nashville Democratic Clarion published the account, which newspapers across the country repeated and embellished. The Nashville newspaper also reported that Lewis's throat was cut. Money that Lewis had borrowed from Major Gilbert Russell at Fort Pickering to complete the journey was missing.

While Jefferson and some modern historians have generally accepted Lewis's death as a suicide, debate continues. No one reported seeing Lewis shoot himself; three inconsistent, somewhat contemporary accounts are attributed to Mrs. Griner, who left no written account or testimony. Some thus believe her testimony was fabricated, while others point to it as proof of suicide. Mrs. Griner claimed Lewis acted strangely the night before his death: standing and pacing during dinner and talking to himself in the way one would speak to a lawyer, with face flushed as if it had come on him in a fit. She continued to hear him talking to himself after he retired, and then at some point in the night, she heard multiple gunshots, a scuffle, and someone calling for help.

She claimed to see Lewis through the slit in the door crawling back to his room. She did not explain why she stopped investigating then or decided to send her children to look for his servants the following day. Another account claims the servants found him in the cabin, wounded and bloody, with part of his skull gone, where he lived for several hours. In her last account, three men followed him up the Natchez Trace, where he pulled his pistols and challenged them to a duel. She heard voices and gunfire in his cabin at about 1:00 am. She then found it empty with a large amount of gunpowder on the floor.

Lewis's relatives maintained it was murder. A coroner's inquest held immediately after his death, as provided by local law, did not charge anyone with any crime. When William Clark and Jefferson were informed of Lewis's death, both accepted the conclusion of suicide. Based on their positions and the lost Lewis letter of mid-September 1809, historian Stephen Ambrose dismissed the murder theory as "not convincing".

=== Later analysis ===
The only doctor to examine Lewis's body did not do so until 39 years later, in 1848. The Tennessee State Commission, including Samuel B. Moore, charged with locating Lewis's grave and erecting a monument over it, opened Lewis's grave. The commission wrote in its official report that though the impression had long prevailed that Lewis died by his own hand, "it seems to be more probable that he died by the hands of an assassin." In the book The History of the Lewis and Clark Expedition, first printed in 1893, the editor Elliott Coues expressed doubt about Thomas Jefferson's conclusion that Lewis committed suicide, despite including the former president's Memoir of Meriwether Lewis in his book.

From 1993 to 2010, about 200 of Lewis's kin (through his sister Jane, as he had no children) sought to have the body exhumed for forensic analysis, to try to determine whether his death was a suicide or murder. A Tennessee coroner's jury in 1996 recommended exhumation. Since his gravesite is in a national monument, the National Park Service must approve. The agency refused the request in 1998, citing possible disturbance to the bodies of more than 100 pioneers buried nearby. In 2008, the Department of the Interior approved the exhumation, but rescinded that decision in 2010, stating that the decision is final. It is nonetheless improving the gravesite and visitor facility.

Historian Paul Russell Cutright wrote a detailed rebuttal of the murder/robbery theory, concluding that it "lacks legs to stand on". He stressed Lewis's debts, heavy drinking, possible morphine and opium use, failure to prepare the expedition's journals for publication, repeated failure to find a wife, and the deterioration of his friendship with Thomas Jefferson. This refutation was countered by Dr. Eldon G. Chuinard, (physician), who argued for the murder hypothesis on the basis that Lewis's reported wounds were inconsistent with his reported two-hour survival after the shooting. This particular medical theory as well as other medical/psychological theories often cited by numerous Lewis authors (syphilis, malaria, alcohol abuse, mercury poisoning, PTSD, depression, et al.), have been explored by Dr. David J. Peck (physician) and Marti Peck, Ph.D. (psychologist) in their book So Hard to Die. Leading Lewis scholars Donald Jackson, Jay H. Buckley, Clay S. Jenkinson, and others have stated that, regardless of their leanings or beliefs, the facts of his death are not known, there were no eyewitnesses, and the reliability of reports of those in the place or vicinity cannot be considered certain. Author Peter Stark believes that post-traumatic stress disorder may have been a contributor to Meriwether Lewis's condition after spending months traversing hostile Indian territory, particularly because travelers coming afterward exhibited the same symptoms. According to research from author Thomas Danisi, Lewis's self-inflicted gunshot wounds were not the result of murder or attempted suicide, but a combination of a severe malarial attack, a deranged state of mind, and intense pain.

== Memorials ==
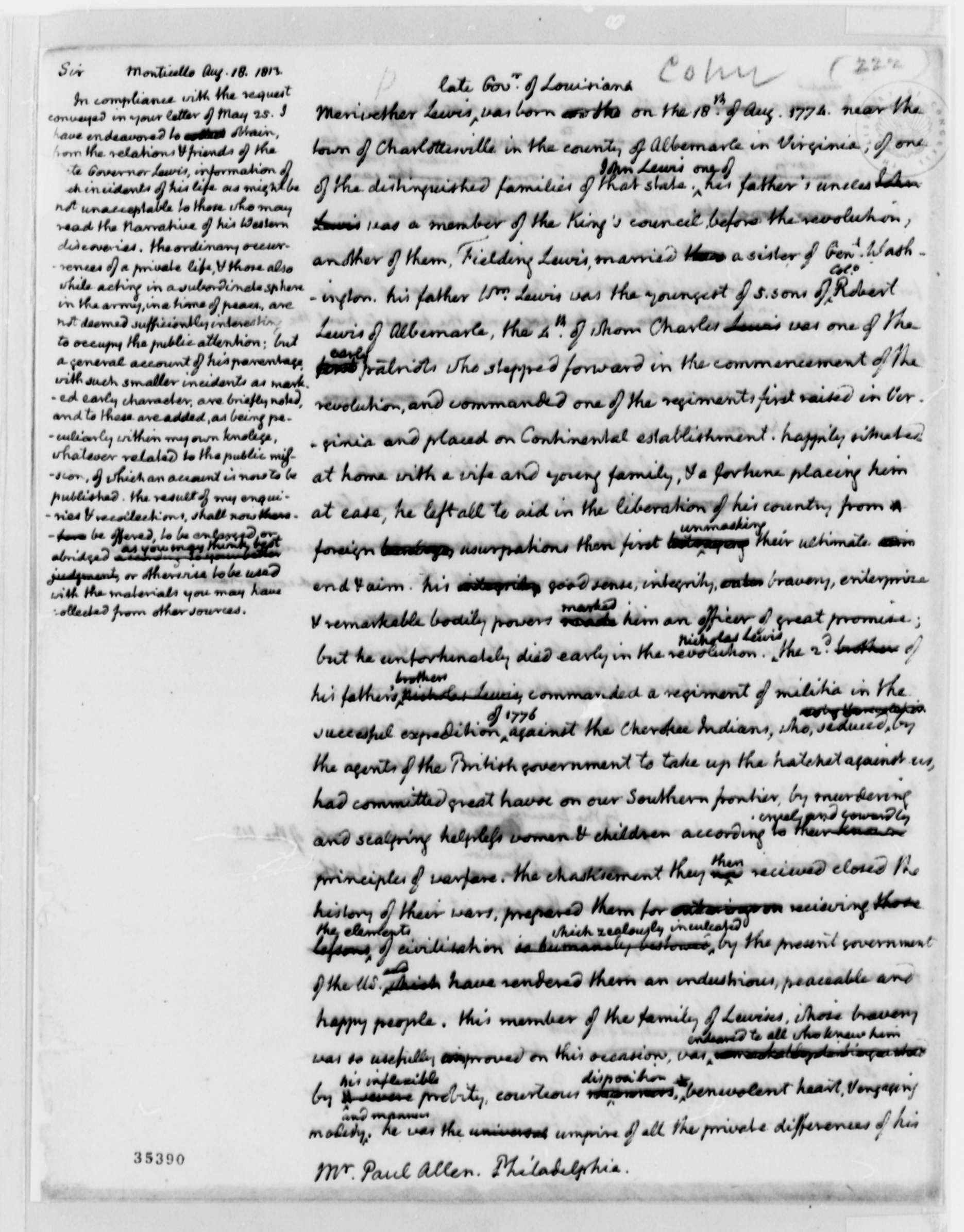
Letter from Thomas Jefferson to Paul Allen with a biography of Meriwether Lewis, 1813

Lewis was buried near his place of death in present-day Hohenwald. His grave was located about 200 yards from Grinder's Stand, alongside the Natchez Trace (that section of the 1801 Natchez Trace was built by the U.S. Army under the direction of Lewis's mentor, Thomas Jefferson, during Lewis's lifetime).

At first, the grave was unmarked. Alexander Wilson, an ornithologist and friend of Lewis who visited the grave in May 1810 during a trip to New Orleans to sell his drawings, wrote that he gave the innkeeper Robert Griner money to erect a fence around the grave to protect it from animals.

The State of Tennessee erected a monument over Lewis's grave in 1848. Lemuel Kirby, a stonemason from Columbia, Tennessee, chose the design of a broken column, commonly used at the time to symbolize a life cut short.

An iron fence erected around the base of the monument was partially dismantled during the Civil War by Confederate detachments under General John Bell Hood marching from Shiloh toward Franklin; they forged the iron into horseshoes.

A September 1905 article in Everybody's Magazine called attention to Lewis's abandoned and overgrown grave. A county road worker, Teen Cothran, initiated opening a road to the cemetery. A local Tennessee Meriwether Lewis Monument Committee was soon formed to push for restoring Lewis's gravesite. In 1925, in response to the committee's work, President Calvin Coolidge designated Lewis's grave as the fifth National Monument in the South.

In 2009, the Lewis and Clark Trail Heritage Foundation organized a commemoration for Lewis in conjunction with their 41st annual meeting from October 3–7, 2009. It included the first national memorial service at his gravesite. On October 7, 2009, near the 200th anniversary of Lewis's death, about 2,500 people (National Park Service estimate) from more than 25 states gathered at his grave to acknowledge Lewis's life and achievements. Speakers included William Clark's descendant Peyton "Bud" Clark, Lewis's collateral descendants Howell Bowen and Tom McSwain, and Stephanie Ambrose Tubbs (daughter of Stephen Ambrose, who wrote Undaunted Courage, an award-winning book about the Lewis and Clark Expedition). A bronze bust of Lewis was dedicated at the Natchez Trace Parkway for a planned visitor center at the gravesite. The District of Columbia and governors of 20 states associated with the Lewis and Clark Trail sent flags flown over state capital buildings to be carried to Lewis's grave by residents of the states, acknowledging the significance of Lewis's contribution to the creation of their states.

The 2009 ceremony at Lewis's grave was the final bicentennial event honoring the Lewis and Clark Expedition. Re-enactors from the Lewis and Clark Bicentennial participated, and official attendees included representatives from Jefferson's Monticello. Lewis and Clark descendants and family members, along with representatives of St. Louis Lodge #1, past presidents of the Lewis and Clark Trail Heritage Foundation, and the Daughters of the American Revolution, carried wreaths and led a formal procession to Lewis's grave. Samples of plants that Lewis discovered on the expedition were brought from the Trail states and laid on his grave. The 101st Airborne Infantry Band and its Army chaplain represented the U.S. Army. The National Park Service announced that it would rehabilitate the site.

== Legacy ==
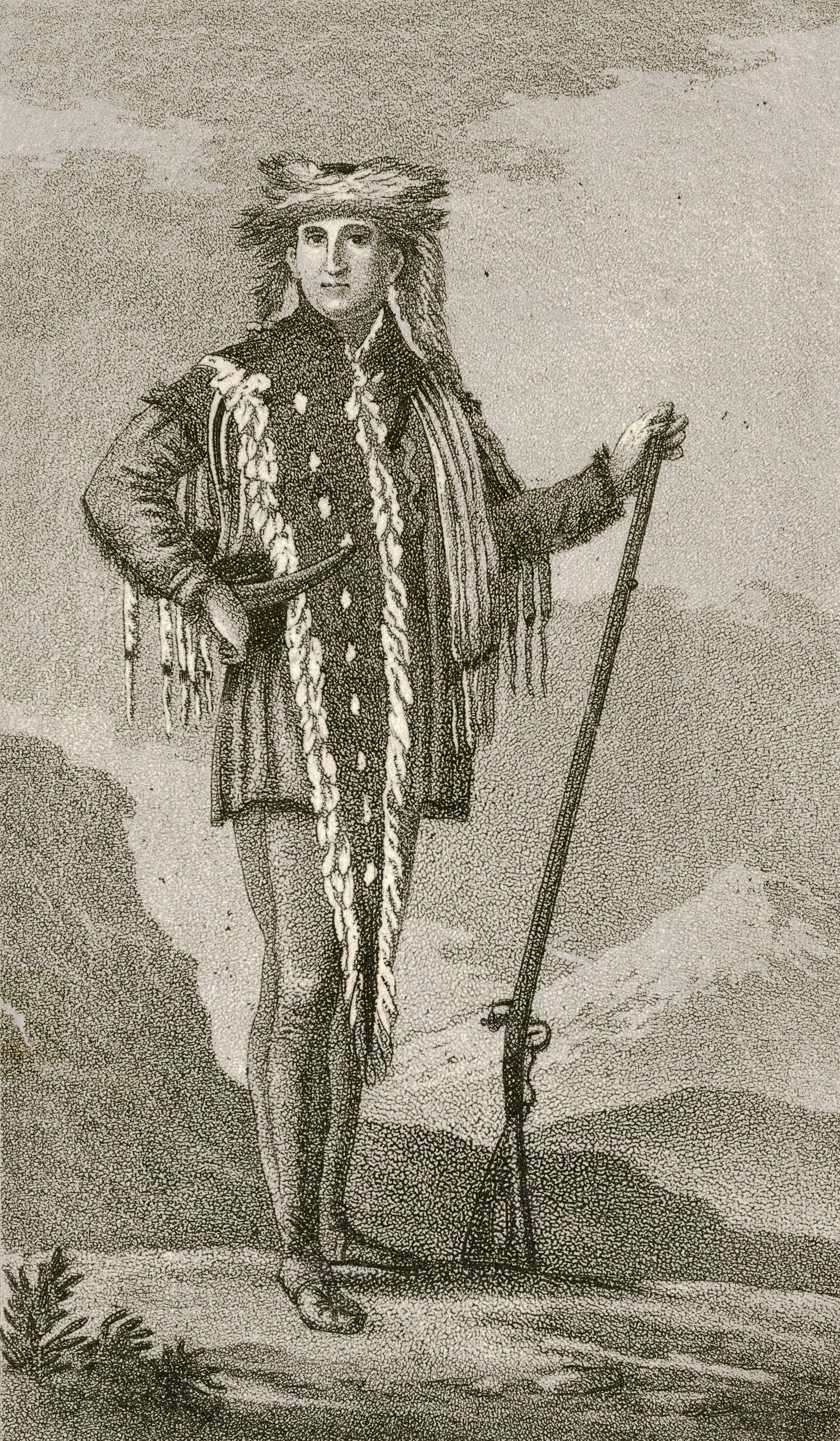
"(Meriwether) Lewis in Indian Dress (Shoshone)," published in 1816

For many years, Lewis's legacy was overlooked, inaccurately assessed, and somewhat tarnished by his alleged suicide. Yet his contributions to science, the exploration of the Western U.S., and the lore of great world explorers, are considered incalculable.

Four years after Lewis's death, Thomas Jefferson wrote:

"Of courage undaunted, possessing a firmness & perseverance of purpose which nothing but impossibilities could divert from its direction, careful as a father of those committed to his charge, yet steady in the maintenance of order & discipline, intimate with the Indian character, customs & principles, habituated to the hunting life, guarded by exact observation of the vegetables & animals of his own country, against losing time in the description of objects already possessed, honest, disinterested, liberal, of sound understanding and a fidelity to truth so scrupulous that whatever he should report would be as certain as if seen by ourselves, with all these qualifications as if selected and implanted by nature in one body, for this express purpose, I could have no hesitation in confiding the enterprise to him.

Jefferson wrote that Lewis had a "luminous and discriminating intellect". William Clark's first son Meriwether Lewis Clark was named after Lewis; the senior Meriwether Clark passed the name on to his son, Meriwether Lewis Clark, Jr.

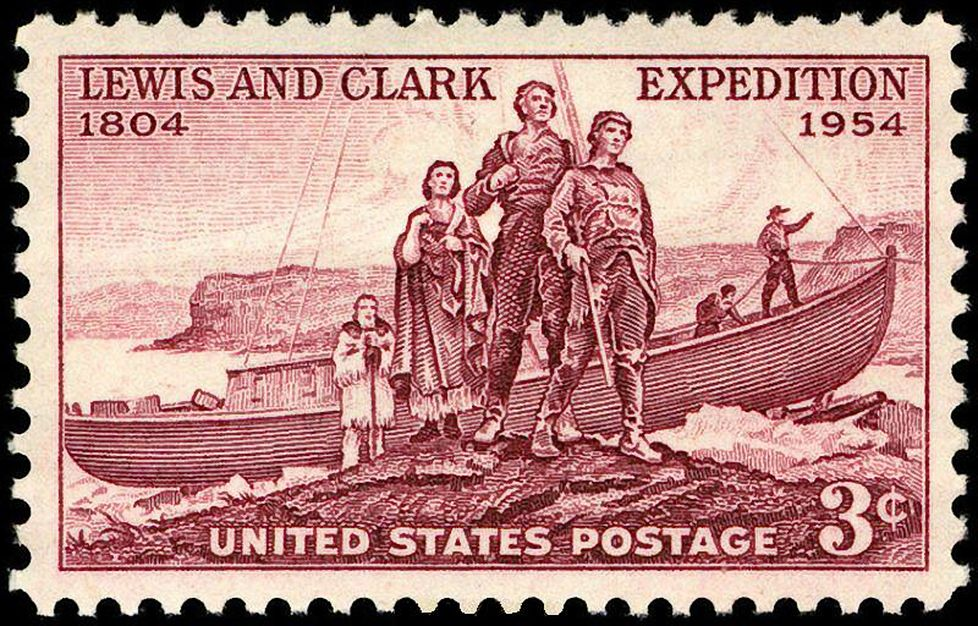
Lewis and Clark, 1954 issue

Captain Meriwether Lewis and Lieutenant (de facto co-captain and posthumously, officially promoted to captain in advance of the bicentennial) William Clark commanded the Corps of Discovery to map the course of the Missouri River to its source and the Pacific Northwest overland and water routes to and from the mouth of the Columbia River. They were honored with a 3-cent stamp on July 24, 1954, on the 150th anniversary. The 1803 Louisiana Purchase doubled the size of the United States. Lewis and Clark described and sketched its flora and fauna and described the native inhabitants they encountered before returning to St. Louis in 1806.

=== Coins ===
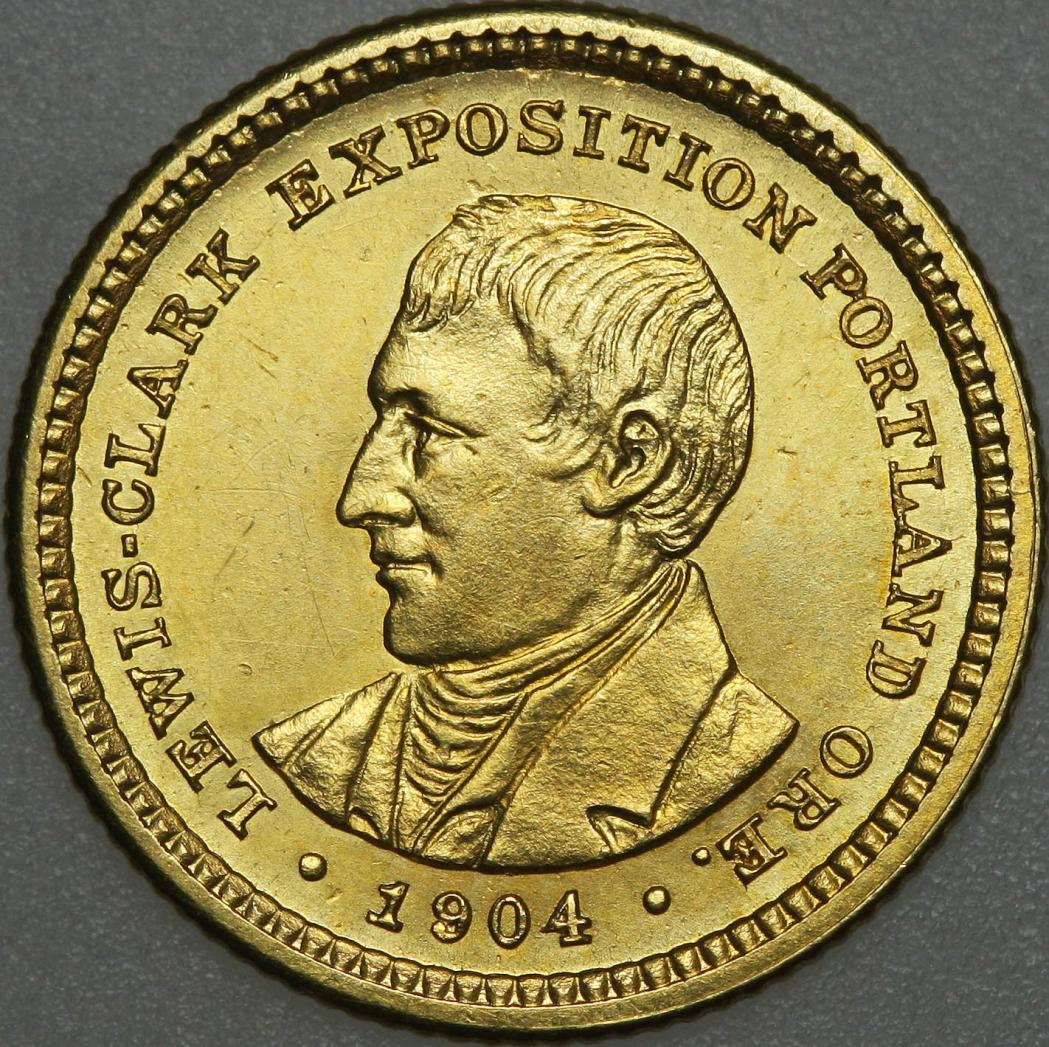
Lewis depicted on the 1904–05 commemorative Lewis and Clark Exposition dollar

Both Lewis and Clark appear on the gold Lewis and Clark Exposition dollars minted for the Lewis and Clark Centennial Exposition. Among the early United States commemorative coins, they were produced in 1904 and 1905 and survived in relatively small numbers.

=== Postage stamps ===
The Lewis and Clark Expedition was celebrated on May 14, 2004, the 200th anniversary of its outset, by depicting the two on a hilltop outlook: two companion 37-cent USPS stamps showed portraits of Meriwether Lewis and William Clark. A special 32-page booklet accompanied the issue in eleven cities along the route taken by the Corps of Discovery. An image of the stamp can be found on Arago online at the link in the footnote.

=== Flora and fauna ===
The plant genus Lewisia (family Portulacaceae), popular in rock gardens and which includes the bitterroot (Lewisia rediviva), the state flower of Montana, is named after Lewis, as is Lewis's woodpecker (Melanerpes lewis) and a subspecies of the cutthroat trout, the westslope cutthroat trout (Oncorhynchus clarkii lewisi). Also named after him in 1999, is Lewisiopsis tweedyi which is a flowering plant and sole species in genus Lewisiopsis (in the family Montiaceae). In 2004, the American elm cultivar Ulmus americana 'Lewis & Clark' (selling name Prairie Expedition) was released by North Dakota State University Research Foundation in commemoration of the Lewis & Clark expedition's bicentenary; the tree has a resistance to Dutch elm disease.

=== Geographic names ===
Geographic names that honor him include:

- Lewis County, Kentucky
- Lewis County, Tennessee
- Lewis County, Missouri
- Lewis County, Idaho
- Lewis County, Washington
- Lewisburg, Tennessee
- Lewiston, Idaho
- The U.S. Army fort Fort Lewis, Washington, the home of the US Army 1st Corps (I Corps)
- Lewis and Clark County, Montana, the home of the capital city, Helena
- Lewis and Clark Pass (Montana)
- Lewis and Clark National Forest
- Lewistown, Montana
- The Lewis Range of Montana's Glacier National Park
- Lewis Avenue in Billings, Montana
- Gates of the Mountains Wilderness, a day-use campground north of Helena, Montana's Meriwether Picnic site
- Lewis and Clark Caverns, a cave between Three Forks and Whitehall, Montana
- Seaside, Oregon has numerous landmarks, museums, and a "Lewis and Clark Avenue" devoted to both of the explorers. This small city is also known as the end of their journey to the Pacific Coast.

Fort Clatsop was the encampment of the Lewis and Clark Expedition in the Oregon Country near the mouth of the Columbia River during the winter of 1805–1806. Located along the Lewis and Clark River at the north end of the Clatsop Plains approximately 5 miles (8.0 km) southwest of Astoria, the fort was the last encampment of the Corps of Discovery, before embarking on their return trip east to St. Louis.

- Lewis and Clark State Park, a state park located in Williams County, North Dakota near Williston which is a part of the North Dakota Parks and Recreation Department system.

=== Vessels ===
Three U.S. Navy vessels have been named in honor of Lewis: the Liberty ship SS Meriwether Lewis, the Polaris armed nuclear submarine USS Lewis and Clark and the supply ship USNS Lewis and Clark.

=== Academic institutions ===
- Lewis & Clark College, Portland, Oregon
- Lewis-Clark State College, Lewiston, Idaho
- Lewis and Clark Community College, Godfrey, Illinois. The campus lies about 11 miles upstream from the Corps of Discovery's departure point.
- Lewis and Clark High School, Spokane, Washington
- Meriwether Lewis Elementary School, Albemarle County, Virginia was named for Meriwether Lewis, who was born nearby. The school board voted to rename the school in early 2023, despite 85% of community members voting to retain the name.
- Meriwether Lewis Elementary School, Portland, Oregon
- Lewis and Clark Elementary School, Missoula, Montana

=== Popular culture ===
- Meriwether Lewis's relationship with Thomas Jefferson; Lewis's multiple expeditions, journals, and discoveries; and details surrounding Lewis's death play major roles in James Rollins' seventh Sigma Force novel, The Devil Colony.
- The mystery surrounding Meriwether Lewis's death played a role in the 2016 book, The Secret History of Twin Peaks, by author Mark Frost and in the 1998 novel by Malcolm Shuman, The Meriwether Murder.
- In 2013, on the "Nashville" episode of the Comedy Central series Drunk History, Alie Ward and Georgia Hardstark retold the story of Lewis and Clark's expedition and Lewis's death, with Tony Hale portraying Lewis and Taran Killam as Clark.
- In 2015, Link Neal alongside long-time collaborator Rhett McLaughlin, portrayed Meriwether Lewis and William Clark respectively in the popular web series Epic Rap Battles of History as part of the Season 4 episode "Lewis and Clark vs Bill and Ted".
- In 2022, Evan Williams portrayed Meriwether Lewis in Mysterious Circumstance: The Death of Meriwether Lewis, a film in which four different possible circumstances of his death are presented.
- In 2026, Larry David portrayed Meriwether Lewis in Life, Larry, and the Pursuit of Unhappiness on HBO.

=== Halls of fame ===
In 1965, he was inducted into the Hall of Great Westerners of the National Cowboy & Western Heritage Museum.

== Descendants ==
The Arquette acting family claims to be descended from Meriwether Lewis. Meriwether Lewis never married or had any children, but he has numerous collateral descendants via his siblings. As of 2004 there were around 774 documented collateral descendants of Lewis.

== See also ==
- List of unsolved deaths
- Timeline of the Lewis and Clark Expedition

== Footnotes ==
Political offices
Preceded by James Wilkinson	Governor of Louisiana Territory; 1807–1809	Succeeded by Benjamin Howard
