= David Byrd (politician) =

American politician (born 1957)

Member of the Tennessee House of Representatives from the 71st district
- In office January 13, 2015 – January 10, 2023
- Preceded by: Vance Dennis
- Succeeded by: Kip Capley

Personal details
- Born: September 8, 1957 (age 68)
- Party: Republican
- Spouse: Sherry
- Children: 4
- Education: Freed–Hardeman University (BS); Tennessee State University (MS)
- Website: Official website

David Byrd (born September 8, 1957) is an American politician and retired basketball coach from the state of Tennessee. A Republican, Byrd represented the 71st district of the Tennessee House of Representatives, based in Hardin, Lawrence, Lewis, and Wayne Counties in rural Middle Tennessee, from 2015 to 2023.

== Career ==
Byrd spent most of his career as a school administrator and basketball coach at Wayne County High School. He also served as a Wayne County Commissioner from 1990 through 1994.

In 2014, Byrd announced he would challenge Vance Dennis, state representative for the 71st district, in the Republican primary. He narrowly defeated Dennis in the primary and went on to win the general election unopposed in the heavily Republican district.

=== Sexual abuse allegations ===
In March 2018, three women accused Byrd of sexually abusing them while they were underage members of the high school basketball team he coached. Each of the three women detailed instances of Byrd touching and kissing them and making unwanted advances in 1988. Byrd did not initially directly refute the allegations, and apologized to one of the women, but later issued a statement denying the accusations and "questioning the motives" of his accusers. Nonetheless, one of his alleged victims recorded him telling her, "I can promise you one thing, I have been so sorry for that, I've lived with that and you don't know how hard it has been for me." He resisted calls to resign from influential Republicans such as Speaker of the Tennessee House of Representatives Beth Harwell, and won re-election in 2018.

Calls for his resignation or retirement continued into 2019 and 2020, including an unsuccessful resolution by Democratic Rep. Gloria Johnson to expel Byrd from the House. In August 2019, Byrd promised fellow lawmakers he would not seek re-election in 2020 at the request of Governor Bill Lee; however, he reneged on that promise in April 2020 and filed for re-election. Byrd drew two challengers in the August 2020 primary, but he won re-election.

=== COVID-19 ===
In June 2020, Byrd voted in support of Tennessee House Resolution 340 stating that "mainstream media has sensationalized the reporting on COVID-19 in the service of political agendas." In December 2020, Byrd was hospitalized with COVID-19. He had attended a caucus meeting with nearly 70 House Republicans in the House chamber on November 24, a week-and-a-half before he was hospitalized with the virus. He spent a total of eight months in the hospital, 55 days on a ventilator, and required a liver transplant in June 2021. His condition was so grave, that his family had planned for his funeral. After recovering from the disease, he urged people to get vaccinated saying "I understand the concerns of those who are hesitant [to get the vaccine]. To them, I would say COVID is real, and it is very dangerous. It is a disease that wants to kill us. Please consider getting vaccinated."

However, on August 11, 2021, he joined all members of the state house Republican caucus in signing a letter to Governor Bill Lee asking him to prohibit mask and vaccine mandates.

Byrd did not run for re-election in 2022.

== Personal life ==
Byrd lives in Waynesboro with his wife Sherry; they have four children and five grandchildren.
