= Vance Dennis =

American politician (born 1975)

Member of the Tennessee House of Representatives from the 71st district
- In office January 2009 – January 13, 2015
- Preceded by: Randy Rinks
- Succeeded by: David Byrd

Personal details
- Born: December 9, 1975 (age 50)
- Party: Republican
- Education: University of Tennessee at Knoxville
- Occupation: Attorney

Vance Dennis (born December 9, 1975) is a former Republican member of the Tennessee House of Representatives for the 71st district, encompassing Savannah, Tennessee, Hardin County, McNairy County and part of Decatur County.

== Early life, education, and early career ==
Dennis was born on December 9, 1975. He received a B.S. in agriculture from the University of Tennessee at Knoxville and a J.D. from the University of Tennessee College of Law. He is a member of Alpha Gamma Rho, and a past president of their Alpha Kappa chapter.

Dennis started his career as an attorney. He is a member and past president of the Savannah Lions Club.

== Tennessee House of Representatives ==
In 2011, Dennis sponsored a bill to record all police interrogations, but it failed. In January 2012 he proposed an anti-bullying bill with Jim Tracy; it was publicly denounced by Matthew Shepard's father because it carved out an exception for the expression of religious or political views, which opponents called a "license to bully."

Dennis is an active member in the American Legislative Exchange Council (ALEC) and has attended meetings of the organization.

=== Decreased welfare to families with a child making inadequate academic progress ===
In 2013, Dennis sponsored House Bill 0261 which cuts by 30% the payment made to parents or caretakers of children in families eligible for Tennessee's Temporary Assistance to Needy Families program if any of the children fail to meet requirements for grades or attendance.

== Personal life ==
He is married with two children. He is a Baptist.
