= David Byrd =

David Byrd may refer to:

- David Edward Byrd (1941–2025), American graphic artist
- David Harold Byrd (1900–1986), Texan producer of petroleum
- David Byrd (politician) (born 1957), Tennessee politician
- David Byrd (actor) (1932–2001), American actor, known for Mary Hartman, Mary Hartman
