= Kip Capley =

American politician (born 1997)

Member of the Tennessee House of Representatives from the 71st district
- Incumbent
- Assumed office January 10, 2023
- Preceded by: David Byrd

Personal details
- Born: March 18, 1997 (age 29) Tennessee, U.S.
- Party: Republican
- Education: Middle Tennessee State University (BA); Trevecca Nazarene University (MBA)

Kip Capley (born March 18, 1997) is an American politician from Tennessee. He is a Republican and represents the 71st district in the Tennessee House of Representatives. As of 2023, Capley is the youngest member of the State House.

Capley was born on March 18, 1997, in Middle Tennessee. He graduated from Zion Christian Academy in Columbia. Capley attended Middle Tennessee State University where he earned a BS in history and political science. While at MTSU, he became a founding member of the school's Turning Point USA chapter. Capley also earned an MBA from Trevecca Nazarene University.

Capley's first campaign for the State House was in 2022, when he ran to succeed David Byrd, who decided not to seek re-election. Upon his announcement, Capley received an endorsement from Manny Sethi, a Republican candidate for U.S. Senate in 2020. He won the Republican primary and went on to defeat Democrat David Carson in the general election.

In 2023, Capley supported resolutions to expel three Democratic lawmakers from the legislature for violating decorum rules.
