= Grinder's Stand =

Historic inn on the Natchez Trace in Tennessee

Coordinates: 35.50937108334318°N 87.45989191702083°W

Grinder's Stand was a stand, or inn, located on the Natchez Trace. A replica can be visited today at the Meriwether Lewis Park, located on the Natchez Trace Parkway in Lewis County, Tennessee, south of Nashville, southwest of Columbia, and east of Hohenwald, Tennessee. This is where Meriwether Lewis died, by suicide (as suspected by his friend and colleague, Thomas Jefferson) or homicide (as suspected by his family).

== History ==
The tavern is believed to have been established in 1807 and was originally known as "Indian Line Stand". The Chickasaw had ceded the land to Tennessee in 1805. Its proprietors were Robert Evans Griner and Priscilla Knight Griner. The establishment is properly "Griner's Stand", given the proprietors. Soon after it opened, people began calling it "Grinder's Stand", and it stuck.

The original stand consisted of two rough log cabins adjoined at right angles, with a dogtrot between them. Both rooms had doors facing the Natchez Trace; one room also had a door facing the detached kitchen behind the stand. A barn and stable were located on the property, although the original placements of these two buildings have not been determined.

According to tradition, Robert Griner sold whiskey to the Indians, whose lands came within a few feet of the cabin. The proper use of the stand was to provide food and lodging to travelers passing through the Natchez Trace.

In October 1809, Meriwether Lewis was fatally shot here in a disputed manner.

In the 1930s, the Civilian Conservation Corps built a replica cabin less than 20 feet from the remains of the original stand.

== See also ==
- Grinder's Switch
