= Randy Rinks =

American politician (born 1954)

Randy S. Rinks

Member of the Tennessee House of Representatives from the 71st district
- In office January 8, 1991 – January 13, 2009
- Preceded by: Robbie Wolfe
- Succeeded by: Vance Dennis

Personal details
- Born: January 1, 1954 (age 72) Houston, Texas, U.S.
- Party: Democratic
- Children: 2
- Education: University of Tennessee at Martin
- Website: House website

Randy S. Rinks, also known as Randy "Bear" Rinks (born January 1, 1954) is an American businessman (formerly a dealer in building materials, now a real estate agent) and politician from Savannah, Tennessee who served nine terms in the Tennessee House of Representatives, from 1991-2009 (97th through 105th General Assemblies), after serving as mayor of Savannah for four years (1987-1990). Rinks, a Democrat, succeeded Robbie Wolfe in the House; Wolfe had taken office after winning a special election to succeed former representative Herman Wolfe. Rinks was born in Houston, Texas and went to University of Tennessee at Martin.

He did not run for re-election in 2008 and was succeeded by Republican Vance Dennis.
