= Lewis County, Tennessee =

County in Tennessee, United States

- County
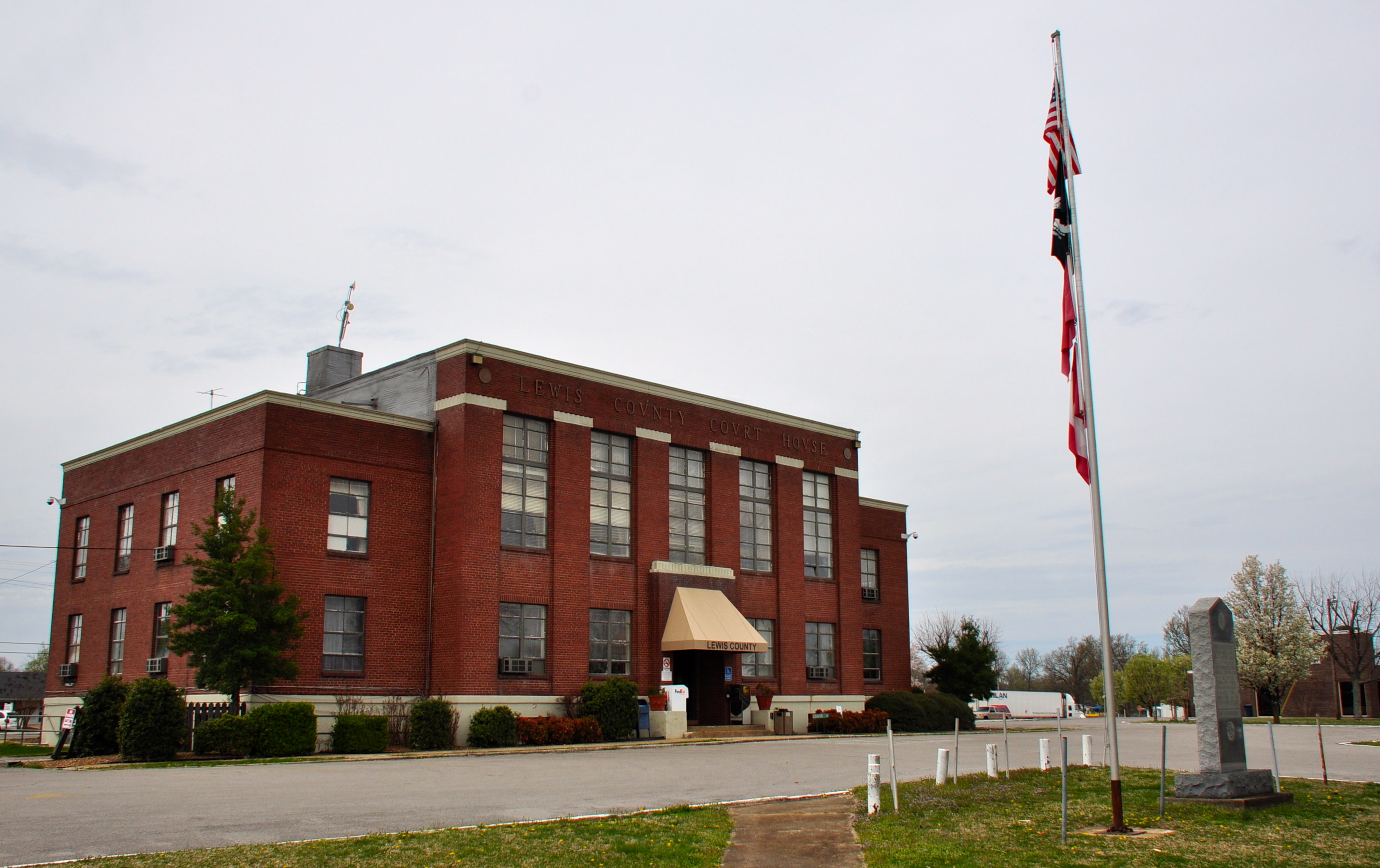
- Lewis County Courthouse, April 2014

- Flag Seal

- Location within the U.S. state of Tennessee
- Coordinates: 35°31′N 87°29′W
- Country: United States
- State: Tennessee
- Founded: December 23, 1843
- Named for: Meriwether Lewis
- Seat: Hohenwald
- Largest city: Hohenwald

Area
  - Total: 282 sq mi (730 km^{2})
  - Land: 282 sq mi (730 km^{2})
  - Water: 0.4 sq mi (1.0 km^{2}) 0.1%

Population (2020)
  - Total: 12,582
  - Estimate (2025): 13,487 ▲
  - Density: 43/sq mi (17/km^{2})
- Time zone: UTC−6 (Central)
  - Summer (DST): UTC−5 (CDT)
- Congressional district: 5th
- Website: www.lewiscountytn.com

Lewis County is a county located in the U.S. state of Tennessee. As of the 2020 census, the population was 12,582. Its county seat is Hohenwald. The county is named for explorer Meriwether Lewis, who died and was buried at Grinder's Stand near Hohenwald in 1809.

== History ==
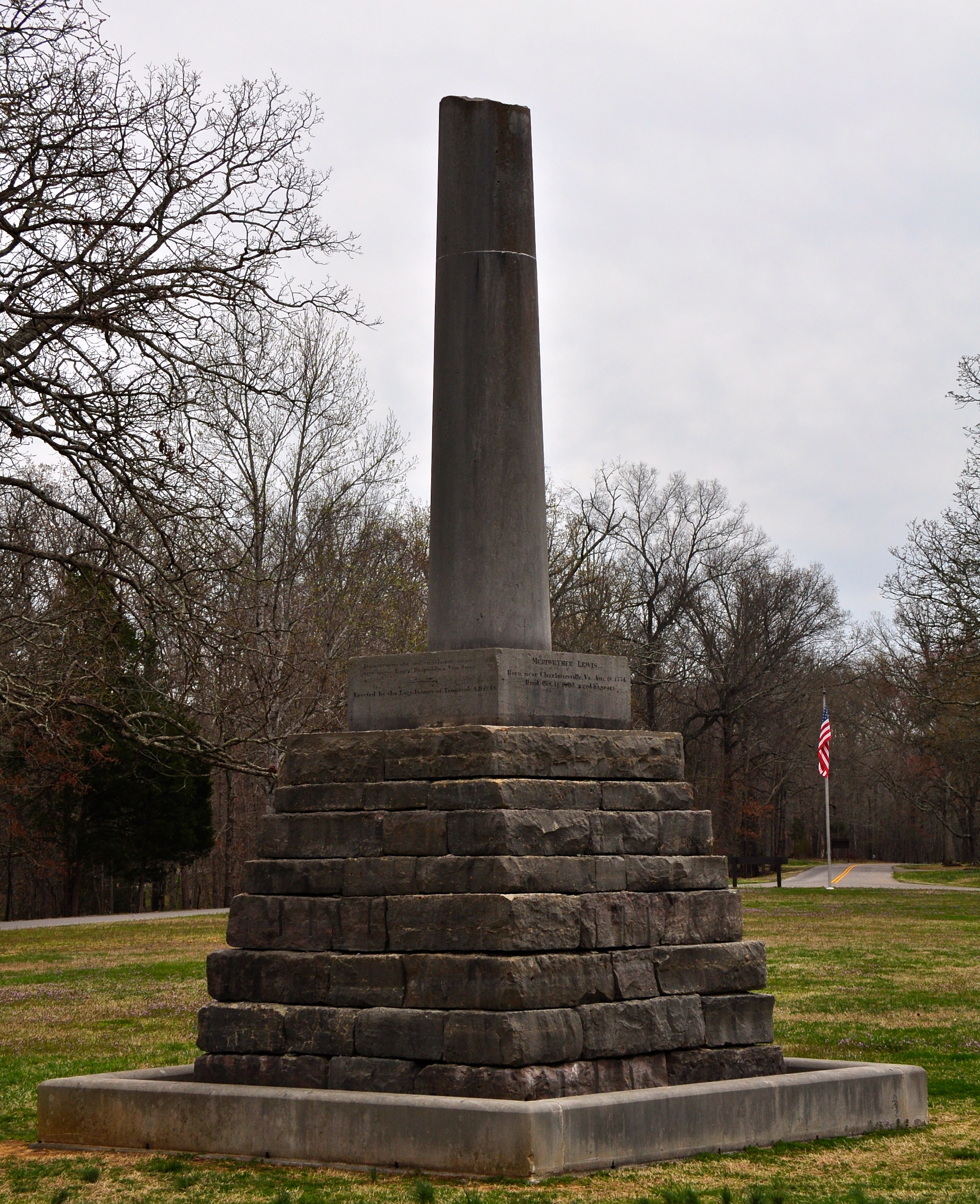
Meriwether Lewis National Monument and Gravesite, April 2014.

Lewis County was formed in 1843 from parts of Perry, Hickman, Lawrence, Maury and Wayne counties. It was named for explorer Meriwether Lewis of the Lewis and Clark Expedition. Lewis's grave is located at the geographic center of the county. The bill for its creation was proposed by Powhatan Gordon in the Tennessee State Senate.

On August 10, 1884, a mob attacked a worship service of the Church of Jesus Christ of Latter-day Saints in what is known as the Cane Creek Massacre. Four Latter-day Saints and one member of the mob were killed.

On October 7, 2009, a ceremony was held at the cemetery to commemorate the bicentennial of Meriwether Lewis's death. A bust of Lewis was presented to the National Park Service, which manages the site.

== Geography ==
According to the U.S. Census Bureau, the county has a total area of 282 square miles (730 km^{2}), of which 282 square miles (730 km^{2}) is land and 0.4 square miles (1.0 km^{2}) (0.1%) is water.

=== Adjacent counties ===
- Hickman County (north)
- Maury County (east)
- Lawrence County (south)
- Wayne County (southwest)
- Perry County (west)

=== National protected area ===
- Natchez Trace Parkway (part)

=== State protected areas ===
- Auntney Hollow State Natural Area
- Devil's Backbone State Natural Area
- Dry Branch State Natural Area
- Hick Hill Wildlife Management Area
- Langford Branch State Natural Area
- Laurel Hill Wildlife Management Area
- Lewis State Forest

=== Major highways ===
- US 412
- SR 20
- SR 48
- SR 99

== Demographics ==
Historical population
Census	Pop.	Note	%±
1850	4,438		—
1860	2,241		−49.5%
1870	1,986		−11.4%
1880	2,181		9.8%
1890	2,555		17.1%
1900	4,455		74.4%
1910	6,033		35.4%
1920	5,707		−5.4%
1930	5,258		−7.9%
1940	5,849		11.2%
1950	6,078		3.9%
1960	6,269		3.1%
1970	6,761		7.8%
1980	9,700		43.5%
1990	9,247		−4.7%
2000	11,367		22.9%
2010	12,161		7.0%
2020	12,582		3.5%
2025 (est.)	13,487	▲	7.2%
U.S. Decennial Census; 1790–1960 1900–1990; 1990–2000 2010–2014

=== Racial and ethnic composition ===
Lewis County, Tennessee – Racial and ethnic composition Note: the US Census treats Hispanic/Latino as an ethnic category. This table excludes Latinos from the racial categories and assigns them to a separate category. Hispanics/Latinos may be of any race.
Race / ethnicity (NH = Non-Hispanic)	Pop 1980	Pop 1990	Pop 2000	Pop 2010	Pop 2020	% 1980	% 1990	% 2000	% 2010	% 2020
White alone (NH)	9,388	9,035	10,940	11,507	11,510	96.78%	97.71%	96.24%	94.62%	91.48%
Black or African American alone (NH)	154	119	164	198	184	1.59%	1.29%	1.44%	1.63%	1.46%
Native American or Alaska Native alone (NH)	16	24	23	34	31	0.16%	0.26%	0.20%	0.28%	0.25%
Asian alone (NH)	12	7	21	43	55	0.12%	0.08%	0.18%	0.35%	0.44%
Native Hawaiian or Pacific Islander alone (NH)	x	x	0	5	5	x	x	0.00%	0.04%	0.04%
Other race alone (NH)	20	8	5	3	36	0.21%	0.09%	0.04%	0.02%	0.29%
Mixed race or Multiracial (NH)	x	x	78	150	435	x	x	0.69%	1.23%	3.46%
Hispanic or Latino (any race)	110	54	136	221	326	1.13%	0.58%	1.20%	1.82%	2.59%
Total	9,700	9,247	11,367	12,161	12,582	100.00%	100.00%	100.00%	100.00%	100.00%

=== 2020 census ===
As of the 2020 census, there were 12,582 people, 5,073 households, and 3,175 families residing in the county. The median age was 43.5 years, with 22.5% of residents under the age of 18 and 21.1% aged 65 or older; for every 100 females there were 95.7 males and for every 100 females age 18 and over there were 93.6 males.

The racial makeup of the county was 92.6% White, 1.5% Black or African American, 0.2% American Indian and Alaska Native, 0.4% Asian, <0.1% Native Hawaiian and Pacific Islander, 0.9% from some other race, and 4.2% from two or more races. Hispanic or Latino residents of any race comprised 2.6% of the population.

<0.1% of residents lived in urban areas, while 100.0% lived in rural areas.

There were 5,073 households in the county, of which 29.0% had children under the age of 18 living in them. Of all households, 48.4% were married-couple households, 18.1% were households with a male householder and no spouse or partner present, and 27.4% were households with a female householder and no spouse or partner present. About 28.8% of all households were made up of individuals and 14.5% had someone living alone who was 65 years of age or older.

There were 5,690 housing units, of which 10.8% were vacant. Among occupied housing units, 75.9% were owner-occupied and 24.1% were renter-occupied. The homeowner vacancy rate was 1.2% and the rental vacancy rate was 4.2%.

=== 2000 census ===
As of the census of 2000, there were 11,367 people, 4,381 households, and 3,215 families residing in the county. The population density was 40 people per square mile (15 people/km^{2}). There were 4,821 housing units at an average density of 17 units per square mile (6.6/km^{2}). The racial makeup of the county was 97.07% White, 1.45% Black or African American, 0.20% Native American, 0.18% Asian, 0.29% from other races, and 0.80% from two or more races. 1.20% of the population were Hispanic or Latino of any race.

There were 4,381 households, out of which 33.20% had children under the age of 18 living with them, 58.90% were married couples living together, 10.70% had a female householder with no husband present, and 26.60% were non-families. 23.50% of all households were made up of individuals, and 10.60% had someone living alone who was 65 years of age or older. The average household size was 2.54 and the average family size was 2.98.

In the county, the population was spread out, with 25.80% under the age of 18, 8.30% from 18 to 24, 27.40% from 25 to 44, 24.80% from 45 to 64, and 13.60% who were 65 years of age or older. The median age was 37 years. For every 100 females there were 96.90 males. For every 100 females age 18 and over, there were 91.80 males.

The median income for a household in the county was $30,444, and the median income for a family was $35,972. Males had a median income of $27,060 versus $19,847 for females. The per capita income for the county was $14,664. About 10.30% of families and 13.40% of the population were below the poverty line, including 16.60% of those under age 18 and 12.20% of those age 65 or over.

== Communities ==
=== City ===
- Hohenwald (county seat)

=== Unincorporated communities ===
- Buffalo Valley
- Gordonsburg
- Kimmins

== Politics ==
United States presidential election results for Lewis County, Tennessee
Year	Republican		Democratic		Third party(ies)	
Year	No.	%	No.	%	No.	%
1852	43	18.78%	186	81.22%	0	0.00%
1856	0	0.00%	242	90.64%	25	9.36%
1860	8	2.64%	0	0.00%	295	97.36%
1868	33	100.00%	0	0.00%	0	0.00%
1872	34	20.36%	133	79.64%	0	0.00%
1876	12	5.50%	206	94.50%	0	0.00%
1880	37	15.55%	200	84.03%	1	0.42%
1884	64	23.36%	209	76.28%	1	0.36%
1888	132	33.93%	254	65.30%	3	0.77%
1892	95	26.24%	231	63.81%	36	9.94%
1896	204	38.27%	329	61.73%	0	0.00%
1900	202	33.44%	400	66.23%	2	0.33%
1904	220	33.54%	415	63.26%	21	3.20%
1908	354	43.12%	465	56.64%	2	0.24%
1912	126	19.50%	370	57.28%	150	23.22%
1916	414	51.30%	387	47.96%	6	0.74%
1920	446	52.29%	403	47.25%	4	0.47%
1924	191	36.31%	310	58.94%	25	4.75%
1928	269	39.39%	414	60.61%	0	0.00%
1932	137	14.64%	799	85.36%	0	0.00%
1936	331	23.66%	1,068	76.34%	0	0.00%
1940	368	21.45%	1,343	78.26%	5	0.29%
1944	252	20.88%	955	79.12%	0	0.00%
1948	381	23.29%	1,148	70.17%	107	6.54%
1952	540	29.05%	1,308	70.36%	11	0.59%
1956	522	28.16%	1,321	71.25%	11	0.59%
1960	580	25.09%	1,723	74.52%	9	0.39%
1964	388	15.84%	2,061	84.16%	0	0.00%
1968	455	17.91%	1,088	42.83%	997	39.25%
1972	1,056	46.98%	1,138	50.62%	54	2.40%
1976	617	20.32%	2,391	78.75%	28	0.92%
1980	1,076	32.52%	2,190	66.18%	43	1.30%
1984	1,733	52.42%	1,556	47.07%	17	0.51%
1988	1,324	47.95%	1,419	51.39%	18	0.65%
1992	1,218	29.34%	2,491	60.00%	443	10.67%
1996	1,298	36.08%	1,971	54.78%	329	9.14%
2000	2,037	46.09%	2,281	51.61%	102	2.31%
2004	2,819	55.78%	2,192	43.37%	43	0.85%
2008	2,951	61.05%	1,804	37.32%	79	1.63%
2012	3,117	66.40%	1,447	30.83%	130	2.77%
2016	3,585	77.56%	890	19.26%	147	3.18%
2020	4,474	79.76%	1,072	19.11%	63	1.12%
2024	4,852	82.38%	991	16.83%	47	0.80%

Historically, like all of secessionist Middle Tennessee, Lewis County was overwhelmingly Democratic. Although it did vote for Charles Evans Hughes in 1916 and Warren G. Harding in 1920, Lewis County would be firmly Democratic for the next six decades, being one of only two Tennessee counties to remain loyal to both Hubert Humphrey in 1968 and George McGovern in 1972. Ronald Reagan broke this Democratic sequence with a 177-vote majority over Walter Mondale in his 1984 landslide, but Lewis County would subsequently remain Democratic up to 2000. Since then, however, like much of the rural white South, it has become overwhelmingly Republican due to opposition to the Democratic Party's liberal views on social issues.

== Education ==
The county is served by Lewis County High School.

== See also ==
- National Register of Historic Places listings in Lewis County, Tennessee
