= Hohenwald, Tennessee =

- City
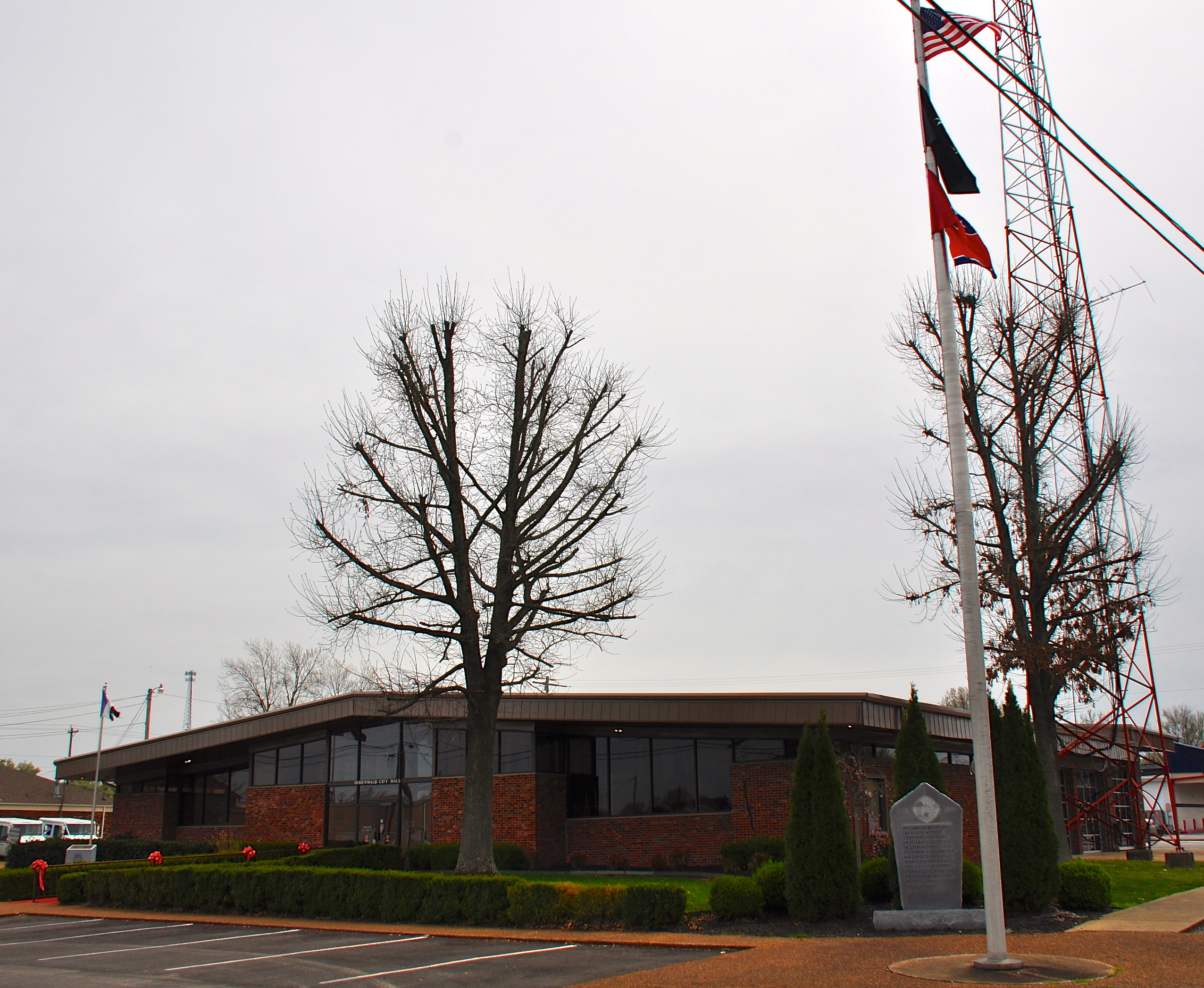
- Hohenwald City Hall, April 2014.

- Seal

- Location of Hohenwald in Lewis County, Tennessee.
- Coordinates: 35°32′50″N 87°33′5″W
- Country: United States
- State: Tennessee
- County: Lewis

Government
  - Mayor: Danny McKnight

Area
  - Total: 5.27 sq mi (13.64 km^{2})
  - Land: 5.27 sq mi (13.64 km^{2})
  - Water: 0 sq mi (0.00 km^{2})
- Elevation: 978 ft (298 m)

Population (2020)
  - Total: 3,668
  - Density: 696.3/sq mi (268.84/km^{2})
- Time zone: UTC-6 (Central (CST))
  - Summer (DST): UTC-5 (CDT)
- ZIP code: 38462
- Area code: 931
- FIPS code: 47-35160
- GNIS feature ID: 1307347
- Website: hohenwald.com

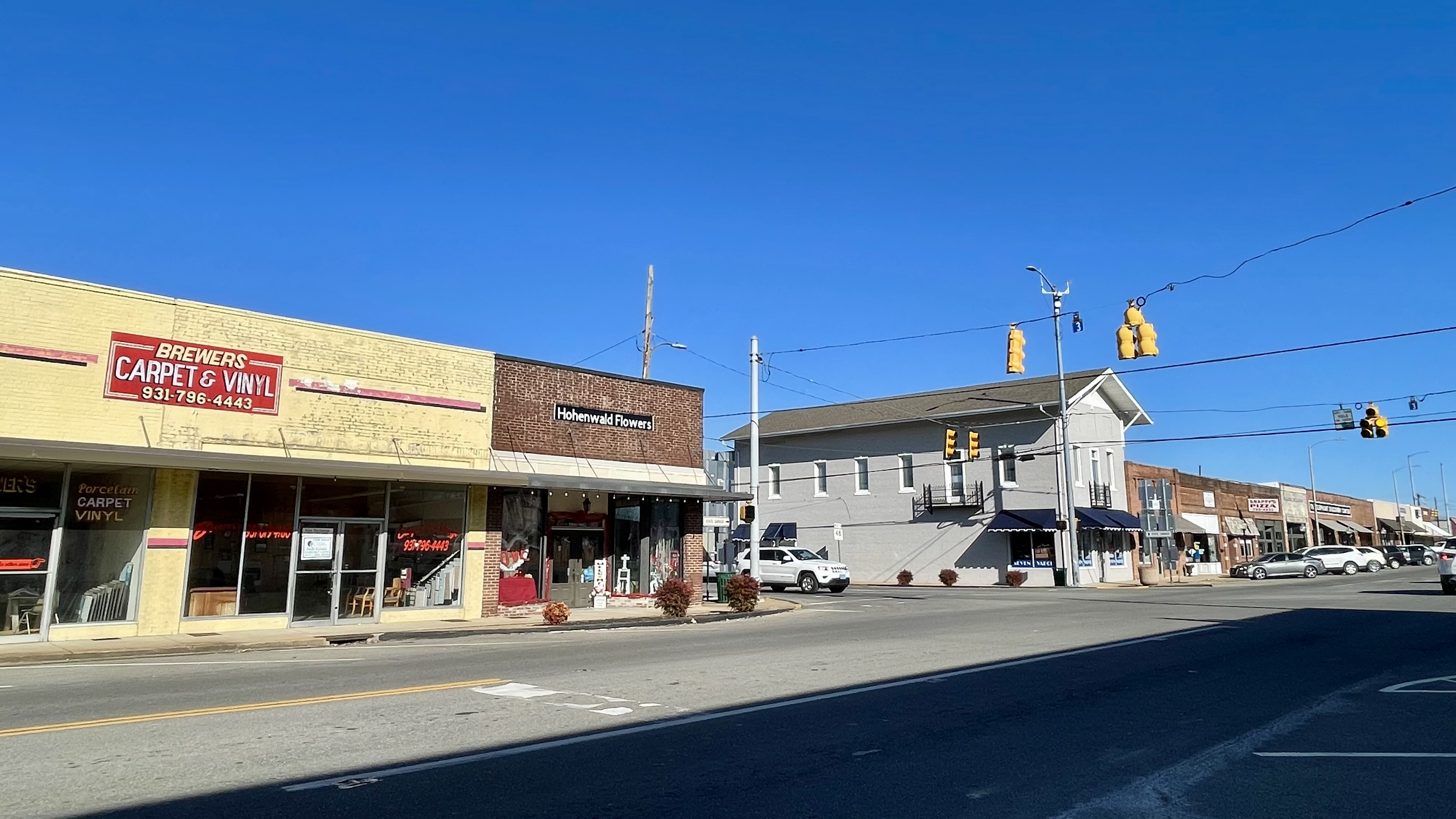
Downtown Hohenwald, TN February 2022

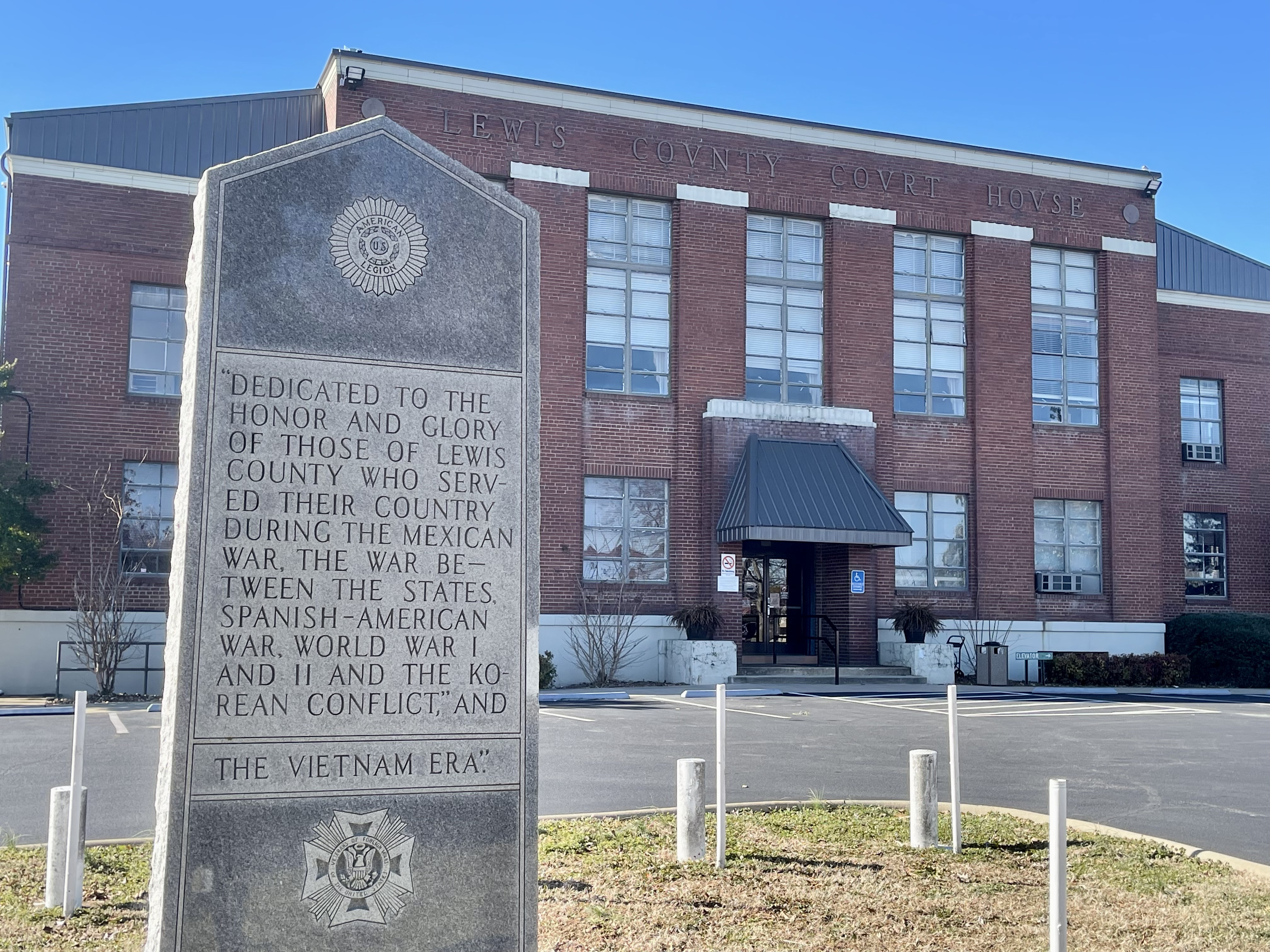
Lewis County Courthouse in Hohenwald, TN

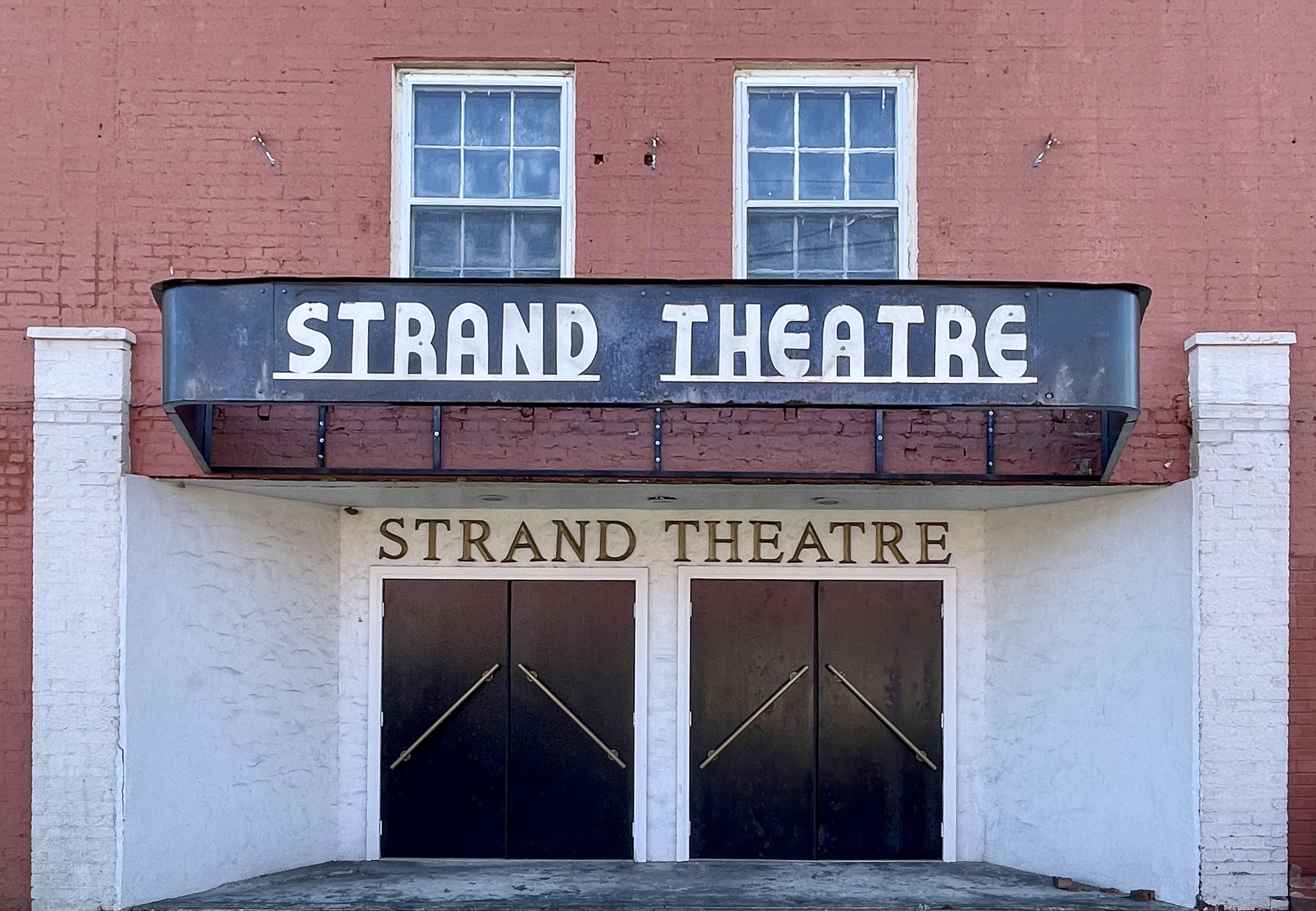
Strand Theater in Hohenwald, TN February 2022

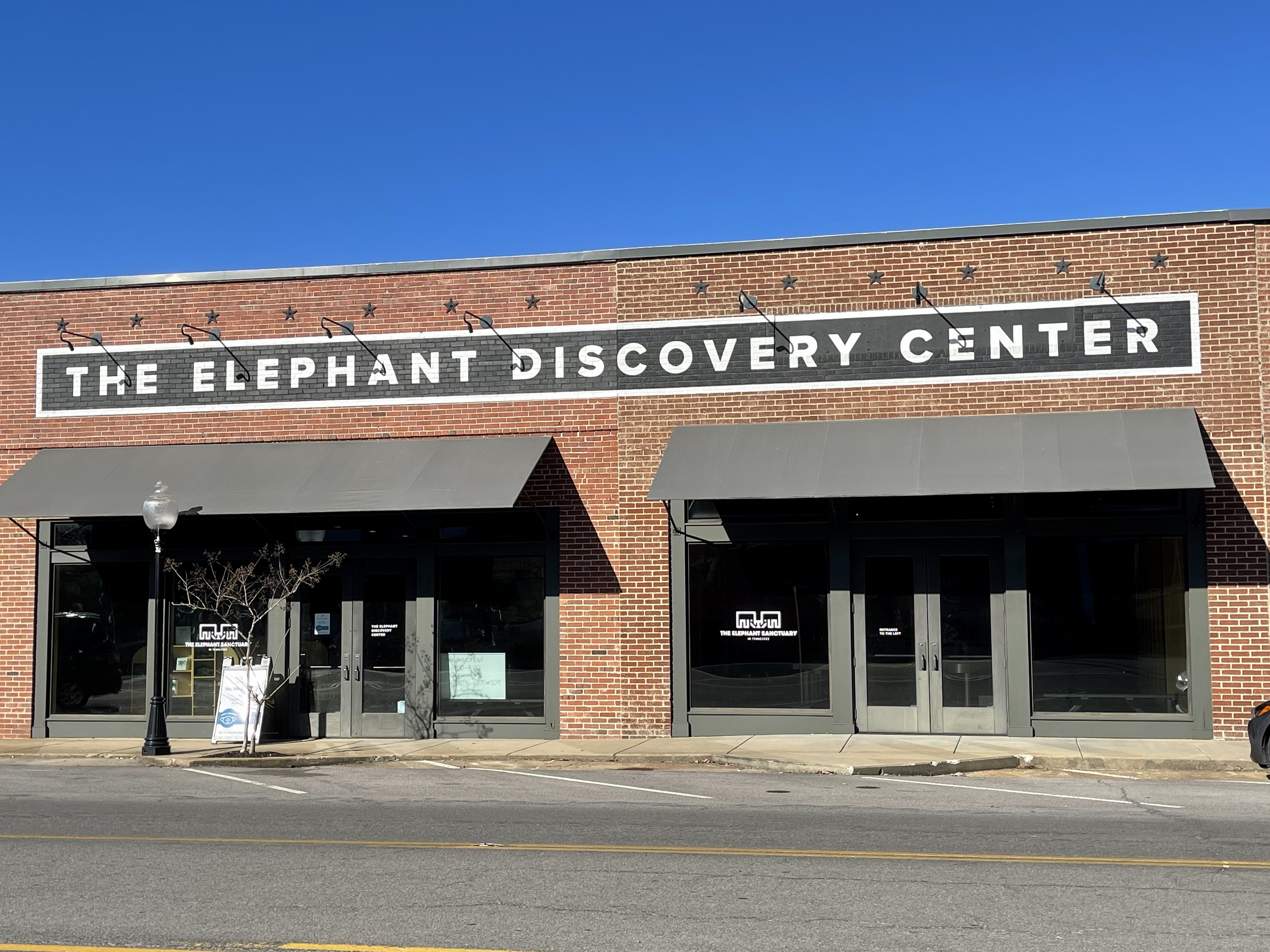
Elephant Discovery Center in Hohenwald, TN February 2022

Hohenwald is a city in and the county seat of Lewis County, Tennessee, United States. As of the 2020 census, Hohenwald had a population of 3,668. The name "Hohenwald" derives from German meaning “High Forest".

Meriwether Lewis, of the Lewis and Clark Expedition, died and was buried seven miles east of the town at Grinder's Stand in 1809. Rod Brasfield, an old Grand Ole Opry comedy star, made his home in Hohenwald and referred to it in his routines. David Sisco, who in 1974 placed ninth in points in the Winston Cup Series, is a native of Hohenwald, as was author William Gay, whose books include The Long Home, Provinces of Night, I Hate to See That Evening Sun Go Down, and Twilight.

The third largest animal trophy mount collection in North America is located at the Lewis County Museum of Local and Natural History in downtown Hohenwald. Hohenwald is also the home of the Elephant Sanctuary, the largest natural-habitat sanctuary for elephants in the United States. Hohenwald is one of only a few Mid-American towns that have met the Transition Towns criteria. The Buffalo Valley addiction extended care community is located there providing treatment and long-term housing for recovering persons. The Lewis County Courthouse and Hohenwald Rail Depot are listed on the National Register of Historic Places.

== History ==
The town was founded in 1878 and later merged with a town named "New Switzerland" to the south. New Switzerland was founded in 1894 by Swiss immigrants in conjunction with the Nashville, Chattanooga and St. Louis Railway. The railway's extension to Hohenwald served as a catalyst for the towns early economic growth. This rail link enabled the export of timber and agricultural products, key to the local economy, transforming Hohenwald into an important commercial center in Lewis County. This significantly influenced Hohenwald's demographic expansion and urban development, illustrating the profound impact of rail infrastructure on the growth of small American towns during the late 19th and early 20th centuries.

== Geography ==
According to the United States Census Bureau, the city has a total area of 11.3 square kilometers (4.4 sq mi), all land.

=== Climate ===
Hohenwald, Tennessee has a humid subtropical climate characterized by hot, muggy summers and cool, wet winters. The weather is partly cloudy year-round, and the area receives significant annual precipitation.

Key Climate Details

Temperature: Temperatures typically range from 31°F to 88°F throughout the year, with rare extremes below 16°F or above 95°F.

Seasons

Summer, from late May to late September, is hot and humid with average daily highs exceeding 80°F. July is the hottest month.

Winter, from late November to late February, is cool and wet, with average daily highs below 55°F. January is the coldest month.

Precipitation

Hohenwald receives approximately 50-59 inches of precipitation annually, primarily as rain. December or March are typically the wettest months, while August or September are the driest. Snowfall is minimal, averaging about 2 inches per year.

Humidity

The area has a noticeable seasonal change in humidity, with the muggiest period occurring from May through September.

Wind

Average wind speeds remain fairly constant year-round, with February being the windiest month and July the calmest.

Climate data for Hohenwald, Tennessee, 1991–2020 normals, extremes 1895–2022
Month	Jan	Feb	Mar	Apr	May	Jun	Jul	Aug	Sep	Oct	Nov	Dec	Year
Record high °F (°C)	79 (26)	80 (27)	89 (32)	98 (37)	97 (36)	104 (40)	108 (42)	106 (41)	107 (42)	95 (35)	87 (31)	76 (24)	108 (42)
Mean maximum °F (°C)	67.2 (19.6)	70.5 (21.4)	78.6 (25.9)	83.6 (28.7)	86.7 (30.4)	91.2 (32.9)	92.9 (33.8)	94.4 (34.7)	91.4 (33.0)	85.3 (29.6)	77.1 (25.1)	68.1 (20.1)	95.1 (35.1)
Mean daily maximum °F (°C)	47.6 (8.7)	51.7 (10.9)	60.3 (15.7)	70.6 (21.4)	77.0 (25.0)	83.6 (28.7)	86.8 (30.4)	87.0 (30.6)	81.4 (27.4)	71.7 (22.1)	59.2 (15.1)	50.2 (10.1)	68.9 (20.5)
Daily mean °F (°C)	37.8 (3.2)	41.2 (5.1)	49.4 (9.7)	58.8 (14.9)	66.5 (19.2)	73.9 (23.3)	77.2 (25.1)	76.7 (24.8)	70.3 (21.3)	59.9 (15.5)	48.6 (9.2)	40.9 (4.9)	58.4 (14.7)
Mean daily minimum °F (°C)	28.0 (−2.2)	30.8 (−0.7)	38.6 (3.7)	47.0 (8.3)	56.1 (13.4)	64.2 (17.9)	67.6 (19.8)	66.4 (19.1)	59.1 (15.1)	48.1 (8.9)	38.1 (3.4)	31.6 (−0.2)	48.0 (8.9)
Mean minimum °F (°C)	8.7 (−12.9)	13.7 (−10.2)	21.8 (−5.7)	31.3 (−0.4)	40.8 (4.9)	53.5 (11.9)	58.8 (14.9)	57.7 (14.3)	46.0 (7.8)	32.9 (0.5)	22.6 (−5.2)	15.5 (−9.2)	7.0 (−13.9)
Record low °F (°C)	−12 (−24)	−23 (−31)	1 (−17)	18 (−8)	27 (−3)	35 (2)	42 (6)	43 (6)	28 (−2)	16 (−9)	2 (−17)	−12 (−24)	−23 (−31)
Average precipitation inches (mm)	4.44 (113)	4.60 (117)	5.39 (137)	5.64 (143)	5.54 (141)	4.79 (122)	4.85 (123)	4.11 (104)	3.81 (97)	4.24 (108)	4.03 (102)	5.66 (144)	57.10 (1,450)
Average precipitation days (≥ 0.01 in)	11.1	11.7	13.5	11.5	13.5	10.3	11.6	10.4	8.9	10.0	10.2	12.7	135.4
Source 1: NOAA
Source 2: National Weather Service

== Demographics ==
Historical population
Census	Pop.	Note	%±
1920	742		—
1930	980		32.1%
1940	1,086		10.8%
1950	1,703		56.8%
1960	2,194		28.8%
1970	3,385		54.3%
1980	3,922		15.9%
1990	3,760		−4.1%
2000	3,754		−0.2%
2010	3,757		0.1%
2020	3,668		−2.4%

=== 2020 census ===
As of the 2020 census, Hohenwald had a population of 3,668. The median age was 42.7 years, with 21.6% of residents under the age of 18 and 22.1% of residents 65 years of age or older. For every 100 females there were 87.8 males, and for every 100 females age 18 and over there were 85.7 males age 18 and over.

0.0% of residents lived in urban areas, while 100.0% lived in rural areas.

There were 1,505 households, including 840 families, of which 27.6% had children under the age of 18 living in them. Of all households, 37.1% were married-couple households, 17.7% were households with a male householder and no spouse or partner present, and 38.6% were households with a female householder and no spouse or partner present. About 35.9% of all households were made up of individuals and 18.7% had someone living alone who was 65 years of age or older.

There were 1,665 housing units, of which 9.6% were vacant. The homeowner vacancy rate was 2.3% and the rental vacancy rate was 5.4%.

Racial composition as of the 2020 census
Race	Number	Percent
White	3,340	91.1%
Black or African American	67	1.8%
American Indian and Alaska Native	4	0.1%
Asian	33	0.9%
Native Hawaiian and Other Pacific Islander	2	0.1%
Some other race	36	1.0%
Two or more races	186	5.1%
Hispanic or Latino (of any race)	107	2.9%

=== 2000 census ===
As of the census of 2000, there were 3,754 people, 1,534 households, and 989 families residing in the city. The population density was 861.4 inhabitants per square mile (332.6/km^{2}). There were 1,708 housing units at an average density of 391.9 per square mile (151.3/km^{2}). The racial makeup of the city was 96.59% White, 2.08% Black, 0.11% Native American, 0.16% Asian, 0.32% from other races, and 0.75% from two or more races. Hispanic or Latino people of any race were 1.12% of the population.

There were 1,534 households, out of which 28.4% had children under the age of 18 living with them, 48.2% were married couples living together, 13.1% had a female householder with no husband present, and 35.5% were non-families. 32.6% of all households were made up of individuals, and 17.3% had someone living alone who was 65 years of age or older. The average household size was 2.30 and the average family size was 2.89.

In the city, the population was spread out, with 24.6% under the age of 18, 7.7% from 18 to 24, 24.6% from 25 to 44, 22.8% from 45 to 64, and 20.3% who were 65 years of age or older. The median age was 39 years. For every 100 females there were 86.9 males. For every 100 females age 18 and over, there were 80.2 males.

The median income for a household in the city was $24,676, and the median income for a family was $37,609. Males had a median income of $25,863 versus $23,056 for females. The per capita income for the city was $16,665. About 11.1% of families and 17.6% of the population were below the poverty line, including 18.0% of those under age 18 and 17.3% of those age 65 or over.
