= List of United States tornadoes from January to March 2019 =

United States tornadoes from January to March 2019
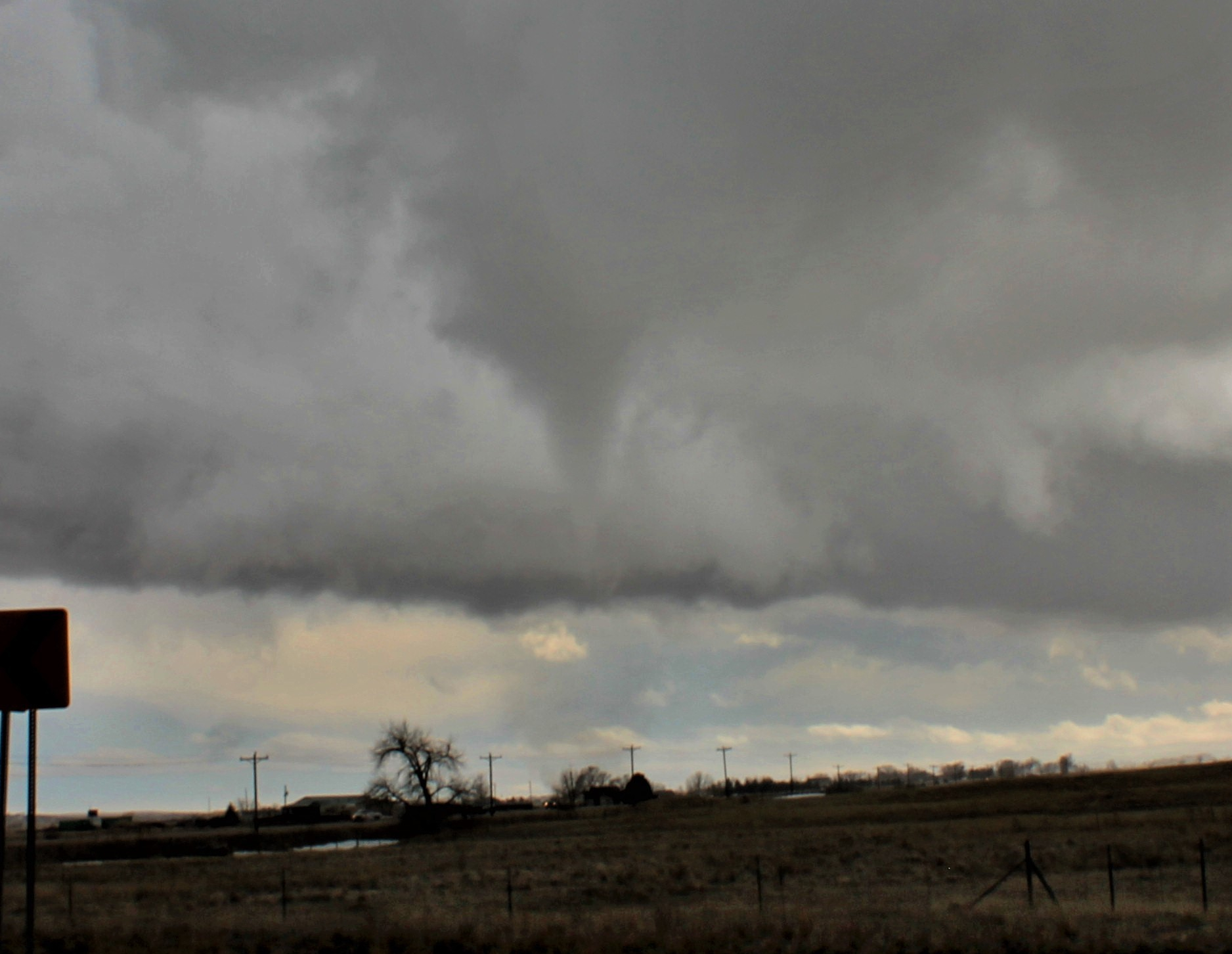
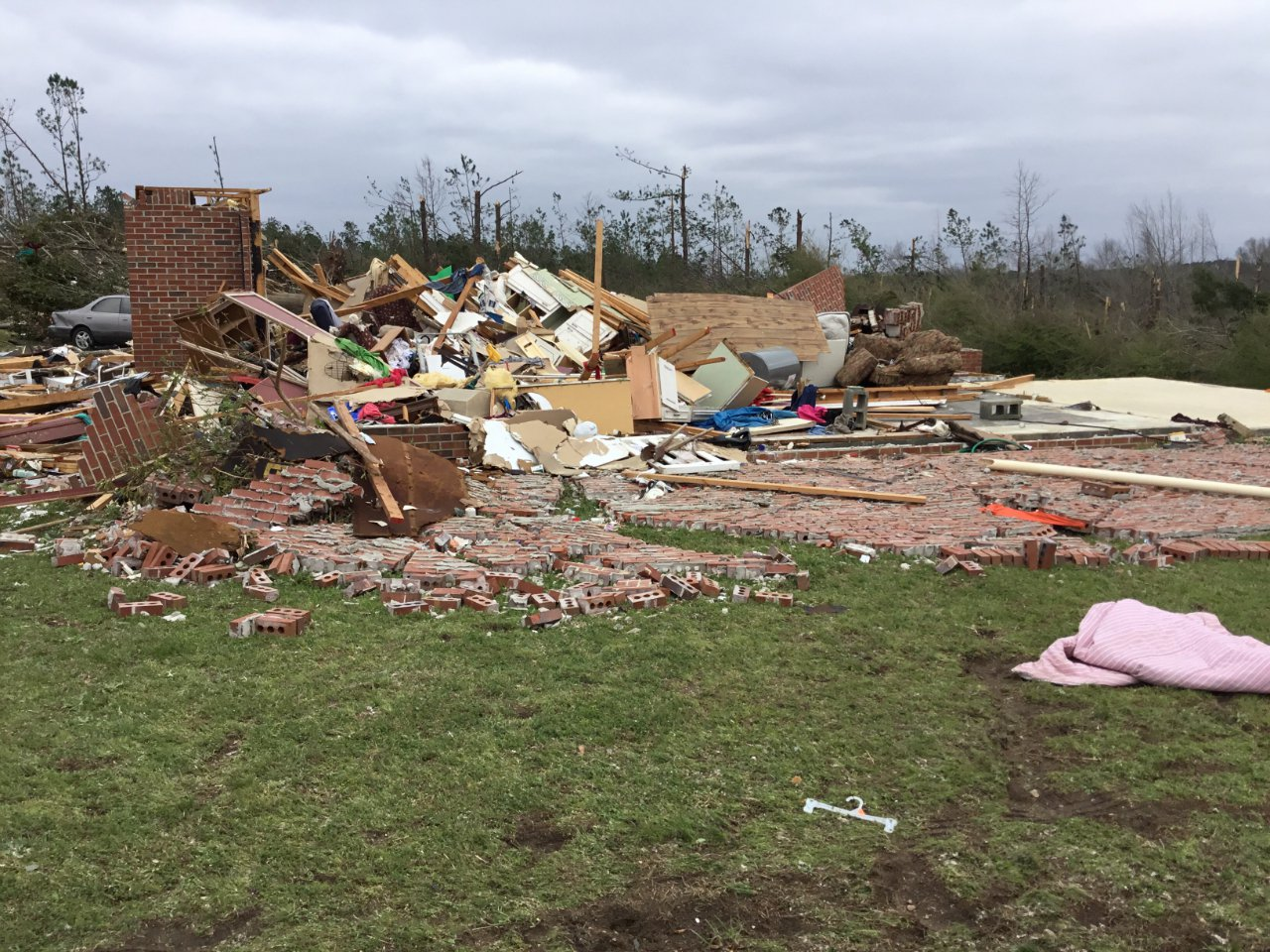
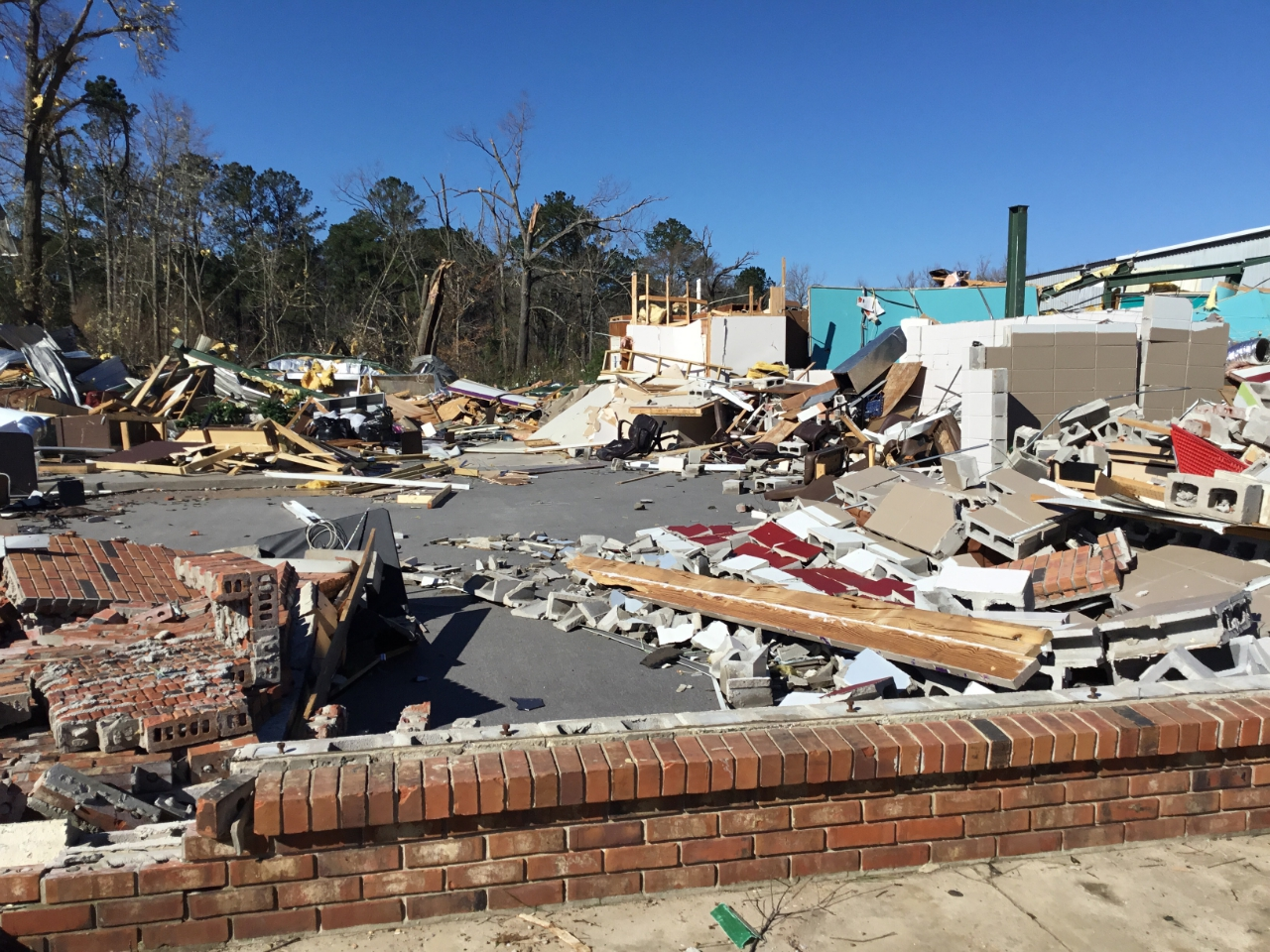
- Clockwise from top: An EF0 tornado touching down near Falcon, Colorado on March 29; A destroyed grocery store in Columbus, Mississippi following an EF3 tornado on February 23; Damage to a home in Beauregard, Alabama from a deadly EF4 tornado on March 3.
- Timespan: January 4 – March 29
- Maximum rated tornado: EF4 tornado: Beauregard, Alabama on March 3
- Tornadoes: 160
- Fatalities: 24
- Injuries: 132

This page documents all tornadoes confirmed by various weather forecast offices of the National Weather Service in the United States during January to March 2019. Based on the 1991–2010 average, 35 tornadoes touch down in January, 29 touch down in February and 80 touch down in March. These tornadoes are commonly focused across the Southern United States due to their proximity to the unstable airmass and warm waters of the Gulf of Mexico, as well as California in association with winter storms.

== United States yearly total ==
Confirmed tornadoes by Enhanced Fujita rating
EFU	EF0	EF1	EF2	EF3	EF4	EF5	Total
179	655	540	119	33	3	0	1,529

== January ==
Confirmed tornadoes by Enhanced Fujita rating
EFU	EF0	EF1	EF2	EF3	EF4	EF5	Total
1	8	12	1	0	0	0	22

=== January 4 event ===
List of confirmed tornadoes – Friday, January 4, 2019 (Note: All dates are based on the local time zone where the tornado touched down; however, all times are in Coordinated Universal Time for consistency.)
EF#	Location	County / Parish	State	Start Coord.	Time (UTC)	Path length	Max width
EF0	N of Abbeville	Henry	AL	31.6165°N 85.2788°W	10:38–10:40	0.15 mi (0.24 km)	35 yd (32 m)
EF0	A brief tornado damaged trees and blew a semi-truck off of US 431. The driver of the truck was not injured.						
EF1	W of Zetto	Clay	GA	31.5976°N 84.9635°W	11:10–11:12	0.23 mi (0.37 km)	90 yd (82 m)
EF1	A brief tornado struck a residence, tearing part of the roof from a carport and blowing in a garage. The residence also suffered brick and shingle damage. Trees were uprooted and large tree limbs were broken.						

=== January 6 event ===
List of confirmed tornadoes – Sunday, January 6, 2019
EF#	Location	County / Parish	State	Start Coord.	Time (UTC)	Path length	Max width
EF0	SSW of Santa Cruz	Santa Cruz	CA	36.96°N 122.04°W	19:59–20:04	0.07 mi (0.11 km)	6.67 yd (6.10 m)
EF0	A waterspout moved onshore, threw a construction sign into a mailbox, toppled two cacti, and stripped limbs from two trees.						
EF0	Santa Cruz Wharf	Santa Cruz	CA	36.9569°N 122.0181°W	20:19–20:20	0.54 mi (0.87 km)	6.67 yd (6.10 m)
EF0	A waterspout came on land causing a restaurant to lose 35 percent of its roofing. Picnic tables were also moved several feet.						

=== January 8 event ===
List of confirmed tornadoes – Tuesday, January 8, 2019
EF#	Location	County / Parish	State	Start Coord.	Time (UTC)	Path length	Max width
EF1	Cortland	Trumbull	OH	41.3226°N 80.8153°W	15:20–15:26	4.5 mi (7.2 km)	75 yd (69 m)
EF1	A tornado downed numerous trees and wires. An outbuilding at a cemetery sustained significant damage, with lesser damage was inflicted to a few other properties in town.						
EF1	NNE of New Lebanon	Mercer	PA	41.44°N 80.06°W	16:25–16:28	2.8 mi (4.5 km)	400 yd (370 m)
EF1	Trees were downed, one of which fell on a mobile home. A brine container was tossed approximately 60 yd (55 m).						

=== January 17 event ===
List of confirmed tornadoes – Thursday, January 17, 2019
EF#	Location	County / Parish	State	Start Coord.	Time (UTC)	Path length	Max width
EF1	E of Clovis	Fresno	CA	36.84°N 119.56°W	23:20–23:25	0.25 mi (0.40 km)	20 yd (18 m)
EF1	Brief tornado caused damage to a building.						

=== January 18 event ===
List of confirmed tornadoes – Friday, January 18, 2019
EF#	Location	County / Parish	State	Start Coord.	Time (UTC)	Path length	Max width
EFU	S of Channahon	Will	IL	41.3494°N 88.2408°W	22:05–22:06	0.06 mi (0.097 km)	25 yd (23 m)
EFU	Two storm spotters documented a non-supercell waterspout over an inland lake. No damage occurred.						

=== January 19 event ===
List of confirmed tornadoes – Saturday, January 19, 2019
EF#	Location	County / Parish	State	Start Coord.	Time (UTC)	Path length	Max width
EF1	N of Redwater	Leake	MS	32.8759°N 89.517°W	12:42–12:46	1.4 mi (2.3 km)	250 yd (230 m)
EF1	The tornado lifted four chicken houses and laid them on their sides. Softwood trees were snapped in open fields and one was uprooted and fell on a house.						
EF0	E of Florence	Rankin	MS	32.1407°N 90.0569°W	13:38–13:41	2.72 mi (4.38 km)	150 yd (140 m)
EF0	A brief tornado knocked down a handful of trees and snapped tree limbs.						
EF1	SE of Brandon	Rankin	MS	32.203°N 89.9774°W	13:44–13:47	2.45 mi (3.94 km)	150 yd (140 m)
EF1	Trees were snapped or uprooted. A power line was downed and a couple homes suffered minor roof damage from fallen limbs.						
EF0	SW of Philadelphia	Neshoba	MS	32.7283°N 89.1581°W	14:43–13:44	0.26 mi (0.42 km)	50 yd (46 m)
EF0	This brief tornado snapped and uprooted softwood trees, some in a trailer park, and broke tree limbs.						
EF1	E of Wilmer	Tangipahoa	LA	30.8092°N 90.3024°W	15:22	0.25 mi (0.40 km)	40 yd (37 m)
EF1	The roofs of several homes were damaged, and multiple trees were downed.						
EF1	NE of Franklinton	Washington	LA	30.9108°N 90.0896°W	15:45–15:47	1.2 mi (1.9 km)	75 yd (69 m)
EF1	This tornado destroyed a mobile home and a large storage building. One home had most of its roof removed and others had considerable roof damage. A pickup truck was rolled and several large trees were uprooted.						
EF1	SE of Selma	Dallas, Autauga	AL	32.3481°N 86.9096°W	19:47–19:55	6.13 mi (9.87 km)	75 yd (69 m)
EF1	Some large farm irrigation equipment was damaged. Hundreds of trees were either snapped or uprooted along the path.						
EF1	NW of Autaugaville to NNW of Booth	Autauga	AL	32.4847°N 86.7275°W	20:04–20:17	9.08 mi (14.61 km)	400 yd (370 m)
EF1	Numerous trees were snapped or uprooted. A small business garage was destroyed, an unsecured mobile home was rolled over and destroyed, and a few outbuildings and houses were damaged. Two people inside the mobile home were injured.						
EF2	Wetumpka to Northern Eclectic	Elmore	AL	32.5202°N 86.237°W	20:52–21:15	18.11 mi (29.15 km)	700 yd (640 m)
EF2	A high-end EF2 tornado caused significant damage in Wetumpka. It touched down just southwest of town and rapidly intensified as it entered Wetumpka, where multiple homes sustained loss of roofs and exterior walls and many trees were downed. The First Presbyterian Church was destroyed and the First Baptist Church was severely damaged. Power lines were downed, and vehicles were tossed, rolled, and punctured by debris. The Wetumpka Senior Center collapsed, the local police department building sustained major structural damage, and a metal industrial building was destroyed. Just northeast of town, additional metal buildings were damaged or destroyed, semi-trailers were flipped, and a business had its roof blown off. Numerous trees were snapped or uprooted further along the path, including within the northern part of Eclectic, before the tornado dissipated. Four people were injured.						
EF1	SSE of Hissop	Coosa	AL	32.8535°N 86.1551°W	20:58–21:01	1.7 mi (2.7 km)	112 yd (102 m)
EF1	Hundreds of trees were snapped, uprooted, or damaged.						
EF1	Tyndall AFB	Bay	FL	30.0716°N 85.6074°W	00:22–00:23	0.8 mi (1.3 km)	50 yd (46 m)
EF1	A brief tornado touched town at Tyndall Air Force Base. The tornado moved a car, broke car windows, tore a portion of a new roof off of barracks and flipped dumpsters and garbage cans on their sides.						

=== January 24 event ===
List of confirmed tornadoes – Thursday, January 24, 2019
EF#	Location	County / Parish	State	Start Coord.	Time (UTC)	Path length	Max width
EF0	NW of Sanford	Seminole	FL	28.8225°N 81.3219°W	11:20–11:21	0.49 mi (0.79 km)	175 yd (160 m)
EF0	Buildings at a lumber yard damaged or destroyed, several trees were uprooted or snapped, and two railroad cars were overturned.						
EF0	S of South Bay	Palm Beach	FL	26.548°N 80.7152°W	14:18–14:19	0.22 mi (0.35 km)	25 yd (23 m)
EF0	A video on social media showed a tornado over an open field. No damage occurred.						

=== January 27 event ===
List of confirmed tornadoes – Saturday, January 27, 2019
EF#	Location	County / Parish	State	Start Coord.	Time (UTC)	Path length	Max width
EF0	Hialeah	Miami-Dade	FL	25.8913°N 80.3236°W	00:52–00:53	0.44 mi (0.71 km)	100 yd (91 m)
EF0	A brief tornado caused minor roof damage, damaged awnings and patios, broke large tree limbs, and uprooted a few trees. The tornado lifted after crossing a small lake and blowing a patio roof across the street. Damage, most likely from downburst winds continued after the tornado dissipated.						

== February ==
Confirmed tornadoes by Enhanced Fujita rating
EFU	EF0	EF1	EF2	EF3	EF4	EF5	Total
0	17	8	1	1	0	0	27

=== February 2 event ===
List of confirmed tornadoes – Saturday, February 2, 2019
EF#	Location	County / Parish	State	Start Coord.	Time (UTC)	Path length	Max width
EF0	E of Stegman	Colusa	CA	39.3514°N 121.9981°W	23:38–23:43	0.1 mi (0.16 km)	20 yd (18 m)
EF0	A tornado touched down over wetlands in the Sacramento River National Wildlife Refuge; no damage was observed.						
EF0	S of Mariposa	Mariposa	CA	37.37°N 119.97°W	23:55-00:00	0.19 mi (0.31 km)	25 yd (23 m)
EF0	A weak tornado was confirmed south of Mariposa.						
EF0	SSW of Yuba City	Sutter	CA	39.05°N 121.65°W	01:50-01:55	0.3 mi (0.48 km)	20 yd (18 m)
EF0	A brief tornado snapped tree limbs and caused minor roof damage to a home.						

=== February 6 event ===
List of confirmed tornadoes – Wednesday, February 6, 2019
EF#	Location	County / Parish	State	Start Coord.	Time (UTC)	Path length	Max width
EF0	WSW of Auburntown	Rutherford	TN	35.9203°N 86.189°W	20:35–20:38	1.7 mi (2.7 km)	75 yd (69 m)
EF0	This weak tornado just south of Milton destroyed a large barn, with debris being blown up to 500 yards (460 m) away. In addition, two homes received minor roof damage, an outbuilding lost part of its roof, and a carport was destroyed. Dozens of trees were downed along the path.						
EF0	SSE of White Bluff	Dickson, Williamson	TN	36.0306°N 87.2054°W	02:02–02:04	1.13 mi (1.82 km)	50 yd (46 m)
EF0	A brief tornado snapped and uprooted numerous trees as it moved northeast. The radar data showed strong rotation and a tornado debris signature. No property damage was reported.						
EF0	NNW of Watertown	Wilson	TN	36.1987°N 86.1873°W	03:49–03:51	0.97 mi (1.56 km)	50 yd (46 m)
EF0	Weak tornado near Tuckers Crossroads destroyed a barn, blowing debris up to a 1/2-mile (0.80 km) away. One home sustained minor damage, and numerous trees were downed.						

=== February 7 event ===
List of confirmed tornadoes – Thursday, February 7, 2019
EF#	Location	County / Parish	State	Start Coord.	Time (UTC)	Path length	Max width
EF1	SSE of Yellville	Marion	AR	36.1227°N 92.6486°W	10:27–10:30	2.3 mi (3.7 km)	100 yd (91 m)
EF1	The tornado blew down trees and damaged a home and some mobile homes. One person was injured.						
EF0	WNW of Decker	Knox	IN	38.5308°N 87.6314°W	16:47–16:49	2.96 mi (4.76 km)	300 yd (270 m)
EF0	This tornado damaged several outbuildings.						
EF1	Oakland City	Gibson	IN	38.3217°N 87.3756°W	17:12–17:16	2.5 mi (4.0 km)	100 yd (91 m)
EF1	A large metal storage building at a golf course lost its roof. Several apartment buildings suffered significant roof damage and lost shingles. A nearby self storage building had partial roof damage. Several other homes suffered minor shingle damage.Several large trees were snapped and knocked down.						
EF1	NW of Robards	Henderson	KY	37.7068°N 87.5966°W	17:57–17:59	1.4 mi (2.3 km)	30 yd (27 m)
EF1	A metal outbuilding completely lost its roof and had its outer walls partially collapsed with roofing material lofted into trees. One large tree was snapped and other minor tree damage occurred.						
EF0	NW of Selma	Clark	OH	39.8280°N 83.7941°W	20:17–20:23	7.5 mi (12.1 km)	150 yd (140 m)
EF0	Two barns were destroyed, with debris from one of them impaled into the siding of a house. Another barn lost a wall while another lost its roof. Several houses and a fire department building lost shingles. One house lost a gutter and an awning and another lost siding. Trees were snapped, uprooted, and blown down along the path.						

=== February 12 event ===
List of confirmed tornadoes – Tuesday, February 12, 2019
EF#	Location	County / Parish	State	Start Coord.	Time (UTC)	Path length	Max width
EF1	WSW of Redwater	Leake	MS	32.734°N 89.7141°W	10:53–10:58	4.22 mi (6.79 km)	500 yd (460 m)
EF1	A tornado snapped and uprooted trees and downed power lines.						
EF0	N of Fayetteville	Fayette	GA	33.503°N 84.5791°W	18:29-18:30	0.56 mi (0.90 km)	150 yd (140 m)
EF0	Several trees were snapped or uprooted. A brief, shallow Tornado Debris Signature (TDS) showed up along this path from Peachtree City (FFC) radar, which helped confirm an EF0 tornado.						
EF0	N of Riverdale	Clayton	GA	33.5978°N 84.4069°W	18:33–18:39	2.98 mi (4.80 km)	100 yd (91 m)
EF0	A weak tornado snapped and uprooted trees and blew a few shingles off of an apartment complex.						
EF0	SE of Locust Grove	Henry	GA	33.3393°N 84.0971°W	19:12-19:14	0.89 mi (1.43 km)	100 yd (91 m)
EF0	A brief tornado embedded in a squall line touched down snapped and uprooted several trees. The front and side porches of a residence were lifted up and collapsed.						
EF0	Ideal	Macon	GA	32.3696°N 84.2018°W	19:29–19:31	0.81 mi (1.30 km)	200 yd (180 m)
EF0	At least 10-20 trees were snapped or uprooted. A small shed had most its tin walls and roof ripped off and thrown.						
EF1	S of Bowman	Orangeburg	SC	33.2551°N 80.6976°W	23:48-23:50	0.61 mi (0.98 km)	125 yd (114 m)
EF1	Several dozen trees were snapped or uprooted. A well-built brick house, an old wooden barn, and another wooden building suffered minor roof damage. A power line was downed as well.						

=== February 15 event ===
List of confirmed tornadoes – Friday, February 15, 2019
EF#	Location	County / Parish	State	Start Coord.	Time (UTC)	Path length	Max width
EF0	SW of Coarsegold	Madera	CA	37.16°N 119.81°W	17:45-17:50	0.56 mi (0.90 km)	25 yd (23 m)
EF0	Pictures and videos on social media confirmed a tornado that caused no damage.						

=== February 17 event ===
List of confirmed tornadoes – Sunday, February 17, 2019
EF#	Location	County / Parish	State	Start Coord.	Time (UTC)	Path length	Max width
EF0	NW of Torreon	McKinley	NM	35.8564°N 107.315°W	22:20-22:27	0.24 mi (0.39 km)	30 yd (27 m)
EF0	The public reported a landspout tornado. No damage occurred.						

=== February 23 event ===
List of confirmed tornadoes – Saturday, February 23, 2019
EF#	Location	County / Parish	State	Start Coord.	Time (UTC)	Path length	Max width
EF2	Western Burnsville	Alcorn, Tishomingo	MS	34.7899°N 88.4084°W	22:37–22:47	8.30 mi (13.36 km)	200 yd (180 m)
EF2	Near the beginning of the path, outbuildings were destroyed, and trees were snapped or uprooted by this low-end EF2 tornado. Several homes and mobile homes sustained moderate damage to roofs, windows, and siding. The most severe damage was observed along US 72 at the west edge of Burnsville, where large trees were snapped, and a two-story brick home lost much of its roof and sustained some collapse of second floor exterior walls. A few other homes sustained less severe damage in this area before the tornado dissipated.						
EF0	S of Artesia	Lowndes	MS	33.3905°N 88.654°W	22:53–22:55	0.47 mi (0.76 km)	150 yd (140 m)
EF0	A mobile home and a tin shed lost portions of their roofs. Trees were snapped.						
EF3	Columbus	Lowndes	MS	33.4865°N 88.4346°W	23:14–23:32	9.74 mi (15.68 km)	440 yd (400 m)
EF3	1 death – See article on this tornado – Eleven people were injured.						
EF0	S of Memphis	Pickens	AL	33.058°N 88.3103°W	23:44-23:46	1.08 mi (1.74 km)	200 yd (180 m)
EF0	Five power poles were downed, and trees were uprooted.						
EF1	S of Kingville	Lamar, Fayette	AL	33.656°N 88.059°W	23:52–00:09	9.21 mi (14.82 km)	700 yd (640 m)
EF1	A manufactured home was vaulted into the air and destroyed. Hundreds of trees were snapped or uprooted along the path.						
EF0	SW of Eldridge	Fayette, Walker	AL	33.8327°N 87.678°W	00:38–00:45	5.04 mi (8.11 km)	350 yd (320 m)
EF0	Trees were uprooted along the path.						

=== February 24 event ===
List of confirmed tornadoes – Sunday, February 24, 2019
EF#	Location	County / Parish	State	Start Coord.	Time (UTC)	Path length	Max width
EF1	SE of Rockford	Coosa	AL	32.8576°N 86.1845°W	07:54–08:01	5.01 mi (8.06 km)	550 yd (500 m)
EF1	Numerous trees were snapped or uprooted. A quarter of metal roofing was peeled from one house, and two other homes were grazed by fallen trees.						
EF1	ENE of Moreland	Coweta	GA	33.2903°N 84.7470°W	09:33–09:36	2.05 mi (3.30 km)	150 yd (140 m)
EF1	Hundreds of trees were snapped or uprooted; several homes were damaged by fallen trees. The metal roof of a barn was peeled off as well.						

== March ==
Confirmed tornadoes by Enhanced Fujita rating
EFU	EF0	EF1	EF2	EF3	EF4	EF5	Total
6	50	40	13	1	1	0	111

=== March 1 event ===
List of confirmed tornadoes – Friday, March 1, 2019
EF#	Location	County / Parish	State	Start Coord.	Time (UTC)	Path length	Max width
EF0	N of Abbeville	Abbeville	SC	34.203°N 82.391°W	23:17–23:21	1.54 mi (2.48 km)	75 yd (69 m)
EF0	Several homes suffered minor damage, and trees were downed.						

=== March 2 event ===
List of confirmed tornadoes – Saturday, March 2, 2019
EF#	Location	County / Parish	State	Start Coord.	Time (UTC)	Path length	Max width
EF0	W of Mendota	Fresno	CA	36.7574°N 120.3926°W	20:15-20:20	0.17 mi (0.27 km)	10 yd (9.1 m)
EF0	Three roofs were damaged.						

=== March 3 event ===
List of confirmed tornadoes – Sunday, March 3, 2019
EF#	Location	County / Parish	State	Start Coord.	Time (UTC)	Path length	Max width	Summary
EF1	S of Chatom	Washington	AL	31.4188°N 88.2566°W	18:55–18:56	3.18 mi (5.12 km)	300 yd (270 m)	Trees were damaged and some were snapped in the vicinity of SR 17. In November 2023, this tornado was reanalyzed and had its track extended significantly based on a narrow swath of tree damage noted on high-resolution Planet satellite imagery. The tornado occurred primarily in densely forested areas largely inaccessible to the survey team. Path length increased from 0.17 mi (0.27 km) to 3.18 mi (5.12 km).
EF0	ENE of Mulberry	Autauga	AL	32.4710°N 86.7470°W	19:19	0.62 mi (1.00 km)	70 yd (64 m)	Tree limbs were broken and some trees were uprooted.
EF1	SW of McIntosh	Washington	AL	31.2118°N 88.1575°W	19:37–19:42	2.6 mi (4.2 km)	100 yd (91 m)	An addition to a church was heavily damaged. Trees were downed, and a few other structures in the area sustained minor damage.
EF4	W of Beauregard, AL to ENE of Talbotton, GA	Macon (AL), Lee (AL), Muscogee (GA), Harris (GA), Talbot (GA)	AL, GA	32.4472°N 85.4818°W	20:00–21:16	68.73 mi (110.61 km)	1,600 yd (1,500 m)	23 deaths – See article on this tornado – A total of 90 people were injured.
EF2	N of Fort Valley	Crawford, Peach	GA	32.5998°N 83.9492°W	20:15–20:22	6.7 mi (10.8 km)	420 yd (380 m)	A mobile home was flipped and destroyed, injuring one woman inside. A vehicle was flipped and rolled, a house had its roof completely removed and sustained partial exterior wall collapse, and a neighboring home suffered roof damage from flying debris. Numerous trees were snapped or uprooted, pecan farming equipment was overturned, and a farming shed was destroyed.
EF2	S of Tuskegee to E of Beauregard	Macon, Lee	AL	32.3455°N 85.7356°W	20:27–20:57	29.07 mi (46.78 km)	1,300 yd (1,200 m)	A tornado formed from an embedded rotation within the squall that followed behind the supercell that spawned the initial Lee County EF4. At some points, the path of this tornado passed as close as 0.4 miles away from the original EF4 path. Many thousands of trees were damaged, including several large groves of trees that were completely mowed down. A few outbuildings were destroyed, manufactured homes sustained significant damage, several homes suffered varying degrees of roof damage, and a farm irrigation system was damaged. A brick church sustained shingle damage, and a cinder block building at a cemetery had its roof blown off. Another church lost roughly half of its roof. Two mobile homes were rolled over near the end of the tornado's path, resulting in one injury.
EF1	NW of Honoraville	Butler, Crenshaw	AL	31.9074°N 86.4802°W	20:34–20:342	5.03 mi (8.10 km)	50 yd (46 m)	In Butler County, an outbuilding was damaged, the roof was blown off a single-story brick home, and numerous trees were snapped or uprooted. In Crenshaw county, numerous trees were uprooted, including one that fell onto a mobile home. A nearby outbuilding was damaged. This tornado was originally the first of two in close proximity, however, in November 2023, reanalysis discovered that it was one continuous tornado path from Butler into Crenshaw county. This was discovered using Planet satellite imagery. The starting point of the tornado was also adjusted slightly west of the initial point.
EF0	Macon	Bibb	GA	32.8296°N 83.6382°W	20:36–20:38	1.1 mi (1.8 km)	150 yd (140 m)	A weak tornado impacted downtown Macon, causing minor roof, shingle, and window damage to several buildings. Three transformers were blown, signs were downed, a large flag pole was bent at a right angle about 3 ft (0.91 m) from its base, and several vehicles had their windows blown out. An anemometer recorded a peak gust of 66 mph (106 km/h) before it broke. Large tables were tossed.
EF1	S of Huber	Twiggs	GA	32.7023°N 83.5584°W	20:42–20:44	1.2 mi (1.9 km)	300 yd (270 m)	A number of large trees were snapped or uprooted. One tree was downed onto a house.
EF0	E of Workmore	Telfair	GA	31.9255°N 82.9292°W	21:05–21:09	4.1 mi (6.6 km)	150 yd (140 m)	The porch to a home was ripped from its concrete footings and tossed over 100 yd (91 m). Minor roof damage occurred to the home and a wooden power pole adjacent to the structure was snapped. Around a dozen trees were downed.
EF0	ENE of Jacksonville	Telfair	GA	31.8517°N 82.8568°W	21:09	0.4 mi (0.64 km)	100 yd (91 m)	A chicken house was lifted and tossed 50 ft (15 m) into a nearby shed. Several trees were snapped.
EF0	SSW of Inverness	Bullock	AL	31.9637°N 85.7804°W	21:15	0.42 mi (0.68 km)	50 yd (46 m)	Several trees snapped or uprooted.
EF1	E of Toomsboro	Wilkinson	GA	32.8071°N 83.0795°W	21:18–21:20	3.3 mi (5.3 km)	630 yd (580 m)	Numerous trees were snapped or uprooted and some roof damage occurred to structures at a mine site. The tornado continued into an inaccessible woodland area.
EF0	S of Rupert	Taylor	GA	32.3809°N 84.2984°W	21:18–21:24	6.6 mi (10.6 km)	200 yd (180 m)	Sporadic tree damage was observed.
EF1	Southern Pine Mountain	Harris	GA	32.8360°N 84.9421°W	21:19–21:28	7.5 mi (12.1 km)	900 yd (820 m)	Hundreds of trees were downed, several of which fell on houses in the southern part of Pine Mountain. In addition, an apartment building had one of its second floor rooms destroyed by a fallen tree.
EF1	S of Oconee	Washington	GA	32.8477°N 82.9564°W	21:24–21:25	0.5 mi (0.80 km)	200 yd (180 m)	Sections of shingles were removed from a house and the backyard shed on the property was flipped and heavily damaged. A number of trees were downed and snapped.
EF1	SW of Tennille	Washington	GA	32.8643°N 82.8495°W	21:36–21:38	1.5 mi (2.4 km)	290 yd (270 m)	A large number of trees were snapped or uprooted.
EF0	NW of Perry	Macon, Peach	GA	32.4654°N 83.9072°W	21:43–21:51	6.4 mi (10.3 km)	300 yd (270 m)	Numerous trees were snapped, metal was peeled from one outbuilding, and a mobile home suffered damage to its skirting and roof. Another outbuilding had one of its three south-facing doors blown off and thrown onto a nearby building, while a 30 ft (9.1 m) wooden fence was snapped at its posts.
EF2	NW of Eufaula	Barbour	AL	31.9653°N 85.3392°W	21:45–21:55	6.68 mi (10.75 km)	700 yd (640 m)	Hundreds of trees were severely damaged, including a large area of trees that was completely mowed down. A large wooden double power pole was knocked down as well.
EF1	S of Davisboro	Washington	GA	32.9334°N 82.6144°W	21:55	0.2 mi (0.32 km)	85 yd (78 m)	A farm outbuilding and an old concrete silo were damaged. The silo was collapsed with its concrete debris scattering and downing nearby power lines.
EF2	N of Eufaula, AL to SW of Weston, GA	Barbour (AL), Quitman (GA), Stewart (GA), Webster (GA)	AL, GA	31.9483°N 85.1537°W	21:58–22:32	31 mi (50 km)	860 yd (790 m)	A rain-wrapped, high-end EF2 tornado destroyed a fire station north of Eufaula, along with several metal-framed industrial buildings and airplane hangars at and around Weedon Field. Multiple airplanes were damaged or destroyed, and numerous trees were snapped or uprooted. A few homes and mobile homes in the area were damaged as well. The tornado continued into Georgia, producing moderate tree damage in Quitman County before continuing into Stewart County. There, multiple large metal-framed barns were destroyed, and several large pieces of farming equipment were moved. A single-family home had its roof ripped off and most exterior walls collapsed as well. Several campers were flipped over and destroyed, and hundreds of trees were snapped or uprooted. The tornado continued into Webster County, snapping a few tree branches and flipping a portion of a large irrigation system before dissipating.
EF0	SW of DeFuniak Springs	Walton	FL	30.6553°N 86.3155°W	22:28–22:41	12.12 mi (19.51 km)	400 yd (370 m)	A weak tornado touched down on Eglin Air Force Base property and moved northeast, producing scattered tree damage.
EF0	E of Shorterville	Henry (AL), Clay (GA)	AL, GA	31.5459°N 85.0784°W	22:39–22:52	9.59 mi (15.43 km)	75 yd (69 m)	A weak tornado began in Henry County, Alabama, uprooting several trees. It continued into Clay County in Georgia where it removed from roofing material from a roadway, downed an irrigation system, and uprooted additional trees.
EF2	Western Evans	Columbia	GA	33.5354°N 82.2159°W	22:44	1.52 mi (2.45 km)	100 yd (91 m)	This tornado impacted the western part of Evans, where numerous homes sustained minor to moderate damage. One well-built brick home had a large portion of its roof torn off, and vehicles were damaged by flying debris. Sheds and fences were destroyed, and numerous trees were snapped or uprooted.
EF1	S of Slocomb	Geneva	AL	31.0631°N 85.5226°W	22:51–22:58	5.14 mi (8.27 km)	300 yd (270 m)	A single-family home had its entire garage roof and a portion of its main roof ripped off. A manufactured house immediately behind that structure was lifted off its anchor points and rotated 10–15 ft (3.0–4.6 m) from its original location. Other single-family homes, manufactured homes, and a barn suffered minor to moderate damage. Larger trees were snapped. One person was injured.
EF2	SE of Clarks Hill	Edgefield	SC	33.6098°N 82.0529°W	22:53	5.05 mi (8.13 km)	200 yd (180 m)	Numerous large trees were snapped or uprooted in the Morgana community, some of which landed on homes and vehicles. Power poles were snapped, and several homes and a gas station sustained damage as well. At least four people were injured.
EF0	W of Branchville	Orangeburg	SC	33.2691°N 80.894°W	23:03	0.16 mi (0.26 km)	25 yd (23 m)	Multiple trees were uprooted and snapped.
EF1	E of Sunny Hills	Washington, Jackson	FL	30.6928°N 85.4779°W	23:33–23:38	5.27 mi (8.48 km)	300 yd (270 m)	In Washington County, several homes had tin roofing material stripped off, with the most severe case involving a metal canopy being blown 75 ft (23 m). Similar damage occurred to homes in Jackson County. Trees were snapped and uprooted throughout the tornado's path, and outbuildings were damaged or destroyed. Wooden projectiles were speared into the ground, and a trampoline and a doghouse were blown away as well.
EF1	Red Bank	Lexington	SC	33.9081°N 81.3538°W	23:53	10.92 mi (17.57 km)	100 yd (91 m)	Numerous trees were snapped and uprooted, support columns at a church were damaged, and roof and property damage occurred to several homes.
EF1	SE of Riceboro	Liberty	GA	31.6807°N 81.4119°W	23:58	7.85 mi (12.63 km)	350 yd (320 m)	Debris was tossed onto I-95, where a motorcyclist hit the debris and suffered injuries. A camper trailer was flipped and rolled about 20–30 ft (6.1–9.1 m), and a single-family home sustained minor shingle damage.
EF1	Lexington	Lexington	SC	33.9613°N 81.2383°W	00:02	1.93 mi (3.11 km)	50 yd (46 m)	An awning at a gas station was damaged, a seafood restaurant had its porch roof blown off, and eight recreational vehicles were overturned at a business, some of which were moved nearly 50 yd (46 m). Two large trailers were overturned at another business, and several homes sustained minor roof damage. Numerous trees were snapped or uprooted.
EF1	S of Boykin	Miller	GA	31.0734°N 84.7113°W	00:02–00:10	4.26 mi (6.86 km)	150 yd (140 m)	Two homes were blown off their cinder block foundations and destroyed, including one that was pushed 60 ft (18 m); the occupant to that house sustained severe injuries. A third house saw a corner of its roof peeled off and a portion of its wall blown in. Two center pivot irrigation systems were overturned. Several trees were snapped or uprooted.
EF1	Columbia	Richland	SC	34.0182°N 81.096°W	00:13	1.46 mi (2.35 km)	150 yd (140 m)	Numerous trees were snapped or uprooted, many of which fell on homes and vehicles and inflicted severe damage.
EF1	ENE of Bethany	Decatur	GA	30.8766°N 84.6863°W	00:18–00:24	4.59 mi (7.39 km)	150 yd (140 m)	Large trees were snapped, one of which fell on a home.
EF1	Fort Jackson	Richland	SC	34.06°N 80.9031°W	00:33	0.6 mi (0.97 km)	200 yd (180 m)	Multiple trees were snapped and uprooted.
EF1	S of Greensboro	Gadsden	FL	30.5648°N 84.5978°W	00:41–00:45	2.12 mi (3.41 km)	275 yd (251 m)	A single-wide mobile home was flipped, a few small utility poles were snapped, and a few homes suffered roof damage either from the tornado itself or fallen trees.
EF1	NE of Omega	Tift	GA	31.3552°N 83.5746°W	00:49–00:52	0.72 mi (1.16 km)	180 yd (160 m)	Trees were snapped and uprooted. A large garage had an exterior wall bowed outward and sustained significant shingle damage. A large trailer filled with air conditioning units, estimated to weigh about 700 lb (320 kg), was moved about 3 ft (0.91 m). The metal roof of the building harboring the trailer and other vehicles were partially uplifted.
EF2	Cairo	Grady	GA	30.8619°N 84.2321°W	00:54–01:00	2.69 mi (4.33 km)	800 yd (730 m)	This strong tornado caused significant damage in Cairo. Numerous trees in town were snapped or uprooted, some of which landed on structures. Many homes were damaged, including several that sustained roof and exterior wall loss. Power lines were downed, garages were destroyed, and several businesses sustained heavy damage as well. A mesonet station in town recorded a peak gust of 102 mph (164 km/h) as the tornado struck. Two people were injured.
EF0	NW of Sopchoppy to SSW of Bethel	Wakulla	FL	30.8619°N 84.2321°W	01:03–01:26	18.41 mi (29.63 km)	300 yd (270 m)	A weak but long-tracked tornado began in the Apalachicola National Forest, damaging trees. A small shed-sized metal canopy was flipped, and a commercial sign suffered some minor damage too.
EF3	E of Tallahassee to N of Lloyd	Leon, Jefferson	FL	30.4934°N 84.1262°W	01:18–01:25	6.5 mi (10.5 km)	700 yd (640 m)	A significant tornado began in eastern Leon County, destroying an outbuilding and snapping numerous trees. The most intense damage was inflicted to two well-built frame homes that were destroyed and left with only a few walls standing. Nearby cars were lofted and displaced, and multiple power poles were snapped. Several other homes sustained major structural damage as well. In western Jefferson County, numerous trees were snapped. Two people were injured. This is only the second EF3 or stronger tornado in Leon County based on reliable records going back to 1945.
EF0	NNE of St. Marks	Wakulla	FL	30.8619°N 84.2321°W	01:42–01:46	0.66 mi (1.06 km)	50 yd (46 m)	Some trees were blown down and a debris ball was visible on radar.

=== March 9 event ===
List of confirmed tornadoes – Saturday, March 9, 2019
EF#	Location	County / Parish	State	Start Coord.	Time (UTC)	Path length	Max width
EF0	Mesquite	Dallas	TX	32.7525°N 96.6189°W	13:38–13:45	1.71 mi (2.75 km)	100 yd (91 m)
EF0	Homes in town suffered a loss of roofing material, blown off chimneys, and windows damaged. A church saw its metal roof peeled back and the brick facade on the southwest corner of the building damaged. A light pole was snapped at its base, a billboard sign was destroyed, and two stop signs were bent over at their bases. A few large trees were blown over and fences were damaged.						
EF1	NW of Keo	Pulaski, Lonoke	AR	34.6012°N 92.1263°W	16:24–16:33	6.35 mi (10.22 km)	150 yd (140 m)
EF1	Trees were uprooted, and tractor sheds were destroyed. Two mobile homes were destroyed as well, with two people injured in one of the homes.						
EF1	NW of Vivian to SE of Mira	Caddo	LA	32.9085°N 94.0064°W	16:45–17:05	8.46 mi (13.62 km)	100 yd (91 m)
EF1	An intermittent tornado damaged the roof of a metal outbuilding and snapped or uprooted dozens of trees. A house sustained minor roof damage, and a mobile home sustained damage to its skirting.						
EF1	NNW of Humnoke	Lonoke, Prairie	AR	34.6258°N 91.8121°W	16:48–17:06	10.8 mi (17.4 km)	300 yd (270 m)
EF1	A number of small barns and outbuildings were damaged, with the roofs of several large outbuildings either uplifted or collapsed. A few power poles were snapped and power lines were downed.						
EF1	NE of Hamilton	Lonoke, Prairie	AR	34.6202°N 91.7206°W	16:57–17:05	5.15 mi (8.29 km)	100 yd (91 m)
EF1	A metal building saw its roofing material ripped off, a home sustained damage, and trees were snapped.						
EF1	W of Cullen	Bossier	LA	32.9557°N 93.6151°W	17:13–17:17	2.87 mi (4.62 km)	100 yd (91 m)
EF1	One metal outbuilding was completely destroyed while a second had most of its roof ripped off. Approximately 200 trees were snapped or uprooted.						
EF1	Springhill	Webster	LA	32.995°N 93.4677°W	17:24–17:28	0.8 mi (1.3 km)	75 yd (69 m)
EF1	The roof of an outbuilding was damaged at Brown Middle School, along with the roof of a single family home. The home also suffered damage to its porch. Another home sustained shingle damage, and a mobile home had skirting ripped off. A few sheds and businesses in Springhill were also damaged. Power lines were downed, along with dozens of trees.						
EF0	W of Falkner	Tippah	MS	34.8423°N 88.9802°W	20:31–20:32	0.03 mi (0.048 km)	50 yd (46 m)
EF0	Weather spotter reported a brief touchdown. The tornado caused no damage.						
EF0	Walnut	Tippah	MS	34.8423°N 88.9013°W	20:36–20:40	3.1 mi (5.0 km)	100 yd (91 m)
EF0	Buildings, storage sheds, and trees suffered minor damage. Several wooden power poles were damaged outside of town as well.						
EF0	S of Pyburns	Hardin	TN	35.0808°N 88.2473°W	21:26–21:28	0.32 mi (0.51 km)	50 yd (46 m)
EF0	A weather spotter reported a brief touchdown. The tornado caused no damage.						
EF1	NW of Short	Tishomingo	MS	34.9536°N 88.2448°W	23:16–23:19	2.2 mi (3.5 km)	250 yd (230 m)
EF1	Numerous trees were snapped, many of which fell and damaged homes and vehicles. Several houses and metal buildings sustained roof damage. An industrial facility and a house suffered damage east of Pickwick lake.						
EF0	Huntsville	Montgomery	MS	33.3505°N 89.4667°W	23:17–23:18	0.38 mi (0.61 km)	25 yd (23 m)
EF0	Several trees were snapped in town.						

=== March 12 event ===
List of confirmed tornadoes – Tuesday, March 12, 2019
EF#	Location	County / Parish	State	Start Coord.	Time (UTC)	Path length	Max width	Summary	Refs
EF2	N of Hagerman to Dexter	Chaves	NM	33.0010°N 104.4402°W	23:55–00:10	15.19 mi (24.45 km)	350 yd (320 m)	A strong tornado touched down near Hagerman before moving northward and striking the town of Dexter. Six homes or mobile homes in Dexter were severely damaged or destroyed, while an additional dozen others suffered minor to moderate damage. An RV camper was tossed and destroyed, and debris was scattered throughout the town and wrapped around power lines. Trees and power lines were downed, and pivot irrigation sprinklers were destroyed outside of town. Six people were injured. This was the earliest EF1 or stronger tornado in the state of New Mexico on record and also the first tornado in Chaves County during the month of March going back to 1959.	
EF2	S of Malaga	Eddy	NM	32.1763°N 104.0794°W	00:08–00:30	14.7 mi (23.7 km)	880 yd (800 m)	Numerous power poles were snapped or damaged along the path.	
EF1	E of Andrews	Andrews	TX	32.3199°N 102.4883°W	02:55–03:01	0.81 mi (1.30 km)	350 yd (320 m)	Homes and mobile homes sustained roof damage as a result of this high-end EF1 tornado, including one frame home that sustained collapse of its attached garage. A mobile home was flipped upside down, and an overhead door was bowed out at a metal building. Power poles were damaged, street signs were bent to the ground, and a small outbuilding was blown across a road and destroyed. A large 300 ft (91 m) tall communications tower was toppled, though the structure was determined to have been top-heavy. Trees were snapped, and an empty fiberglass storage tank was blown over as well.	
EF1	E of Anton	Hockley, Lamb	TX	33.8006°N 102.1549°W	03:35–03:40	3.41 mi (5.49 km)	125 yd (114 m)	A large metal building was destroyed, a single family residence suffered significant damage, and a center pivot was damaged as well. Trees and powerlines were snapped.	

=== March 13 event ===
List of confirmed tornadoes – Wednesday, March 13, 2019
EF#	Location	County / Parish	State	Start Coord.	Time (UTC)	Path length	Max width	Summary	Refs
EF0	Southwestern Junction	Kimble	TX	30.4861°N 99.7843°W	08:00–08:01	0.19 mi (0.31 km)	30 yd (27 m)	Storage sheds and an awning in town were damaged by this brief tornado. A power pole was snapped at its base while a nearby home had its windows blown out.	
EF0	Junction	Kimble	TX	30.4900°N 99.7756°W	08:03–08:05	0.71 mi (1.14 km)	140 yd (130 m)	This tornado touched down immediately after the previous tornado lifted in Junction. Several roofs were ripped off, windows were blown out, and trees and power lines were damaged. A piece of wood was impaled into the exterior wall of a residence, and a deer feeder lid was lodged into the side of a business. An overhead door was blown out at a fire station.	
EF1	Zephyr	Brown	TX	31.679°N 98.8001°W	08:19–08:21	1.39 mi (2.24 km)	230 yd (210 m)	A small residence in Zephyr was overturned and tossed 50 ft (15 m) from its foundation. Several roofs were ripped off, awnings and power lines were destroyed, power poles were snapped, and the brick wall was blown out of a store. Trees and a grandstand were damaged.	
EF1	E of Mineral Wells	Palo Pinto, Parker	TX	32.8088°N 98.0924°W	08:25–08:28	2.3 mi (3.7 km)	250 yd (230 m)	A manufacturing storage building lost some sheet metal roofing. A commercial automotive repair center suffered significant roof and wall damage. Damage to signs, utility poles, and trees occurred as well.	
EF1	NE of Cool	Parker	TX	32.865°N 97.9102°W	08:37–08:39	0.75 mi (1.21 km)	250 yd (230 m)	A site-built frame home had most of its roof removed. A nearby metal-clad commercial building saw its metal roof cross members severely twisted and most of its sheet metal roofing ripped off. Trees and outbuildings were damaged.	

=== March 14 event ===
List of confirmed tornadoes – Thursday, March 14, 2019
EF#	Location	County / Parish	State	Start Coord.	Time (UTC)	Path length	Max width	Summary	Refs
EF2	NW of Cunningham to West Paducah	Carlisle, Ballard, McCracken	KY	36.9236°N 88.896°W	14:18–14:35	16.71 mi (26.89 km)	300 yd (270 m)	This strong tornado first passed near the towns of Lovelaceville, Massac, and Camelia, causing significant damage to at least a dozen homes, including a few with roof loss and some exterior walls ripped off. Dozens of barns, outbuildings, garages, and grain bins were also destroyed. A church had most of its roof and a second-story exterior wall torn off, and vehicles were damaged by flying debris in the parking lot. A business was heavily damaged, a pontoon boat was thrown 120 yd (110 m), and a mobile home was rolled and destroyed. The tornado weakened as it struck West Paducah, where a mall and an adjacent strip mall sustained damage to their roofs and metal fascia. Other businesses had roofing and siding peeled off, a semi-truck was blown over, fences were downed, and signs were damaged as well. Dozens of power poles were blown down, and hundreds of trees were snapped or uprooted along the path. Over a dozen vehicles were damaged. One injury occurred when a grain bin was blown on top of a pickup truck. This tornado passed very close to the National Weather Service office in Paducah, and was caught on video by a meteorologist on duty.	
EF1	W of Morganfield	Union	KY	37.6317°N 88.0728°W	15:10–15:22	9.86 mi (15.87 km)	125 yd (114 m)	A semi-truck was blown over, resulting in minor injuries to the driver. Dozens of trees were snapped or uprooted, several power poles were toppled, and a farm building had a portion of its roof ripped off. A car, a trailer, and a second semi-trailer were blown upside down as well.	
EF0	NW of Smith Mills	Henderson	KY	37.7973°N 87.7769°W	16:14–16:15	1.25 mi (2.01 km)	100 yd (91 m)	Several trees and tree limbs were snapped, and a few trees were uprooted.	
EF0	NNW of Viola	Graves	KY	36.8572°N 88.6342°W	16:27–16:28	0.68 mi (1.09 km)	75 yd (69 m)	Brief tornado uprooted two large trees.	
EF0	N of Sebree	Webster, Henderson	KY	36.6413°N 87.5314°W	17:42–17:44	1.23 mi (1.98 km)	100 yd (91 m)	Several trees and limbs were downed. Shingles were blown off a house.	
EF1	N of Brownstown	Jackson	IN	38.9202°N 86.0382°W	18:06-18:07	1.24 mi (2.00 km)	40 yd (37 m)	A brief tornado damaged some agricultural operations, destroying a pole barn and blowing the roof off of a grain silo.	
EF0	NE of Campbellsburg	Washington	IN	38.7225°N 86.2251°W	18:14–18:17	3 mi (4.8 km)	35 yd (32 m)	A low-hanging wall cloud produced a tornado that intermittently reached the ground, snapping several treetops. A nearby barn sustained significant damage.	
EF0	N of Slaughters	Webster	KY	37.504°N 87.4958°W	18:15–18:17	2.27 mi (3.65 km)	50 yd (46 m)	One television antenna was knocked over. Corn fields were disturbed along the path.	
EF0	SSE of Lowell	Lake	IN	41.2704°N 87.4072°W	18:51–18:53	1.46 mi (2.35 km)	75 yd (69 m)	Some shingle damage was inflicted to a home and one utility pole was snapped, with others damaged. Most of the damage was limited to fallen trees. The tornado was first tornado in Lake County since 2014 and the earliest in the calendar year for the county since 1976.	
EF1	N of Hanceville to SW of Holly Pond	Cullman	AL	34.095°N 86.7734°W	21:10–21:30	11.07 mi (17.82 km)	112 yd (102 m)	A small hay barn was completely destroyed and several outbuildings were damaged. A community center had portions of its roof lifted up and sheets of its metal roofing peeled back. One former chicken house used as a storage building had its entire roof ripped off while a second chicken house suffered moderate damage. Trees were snapped and uprooted.	
EF0	NW of Allgood	Blount	AL	33.9256°N 86.5439°W	22:04–22:09	2.58 mi (4.15 km)	115 yd (105 m)	Damage associated with the tornadoes was primarily limited to trees with the exception of a damaged porch on a single-family home.	
EF1	Allgood to SW of Gallant	Blount, Etowah, St. Clair	AL	33.8921°N 86.5409°W	22:05–22:29	8.32 mi (13.39 km)	1,175 yd (1,074 m)	A mobile home park in Allgood suffered extensive damage from falling trees, with some mobile homes destroyed. A barn and an outbuilding were destroyed, and several frame homes sustained minor roof damage. Past Allgood, minor roof and structural damage occurred, and farm structures were damaged, including chicken houses that had sheet metal roofing peeled off. Numerous soft and hardwood trees were either snapped or uprooted along the path, some of which landed on vehicles and houses.	
EF0	S of Bankhead Lock and Dam	Tuscaloosa	AL	33.3733°N 87.3468°W	22:25–22:28	1.24 mi (2.00 km)	50 yd (46 m)	A tornado was confirmed over a heavily forested area based on radar data. Trees were downed, and a mobile home sustained minor damage.	
EF2	NW of Perry to SW of Lennon	Shiawassee	MI	42.834°N 84.2384°W	22:45–23:05	18.2 mi (29.3 km)	700 yd (640 m)	A significant tornado touched down near Perry before passing near Morrice. 10 mobile homes were damaged by falling trees in this area, and frame homes sustained roof damage and broken windows. North of Bancroft, the tornado intensified and inflicted severe structural damage to several homes, including a two-story house that sustained total roof removal and collapse of a second floor exterior wall. Additional major damage occurred at the southeastern fringes of Vernon, where multiple homes sustained severe roof and wall damage, and a fabrication business was destroyed. Housing insulation from Vernon was found up to 7 mi (11 km) away. Barns and outbuildings were destroyed along the path, and trees and power lines were downed. The tornado was the first to impact Shiawassee County since June 2015.	
EF0	WNW of Pittsburg	Shiawassee	MI	42.8842°N 84.223°W	22:47–22:54	6.4 mi (10.3 km)	100 yd (91 m)	Numerous pine and hardwood trees were snapped along the path of the tornado. One farm outbuilding lost its roof.	
EF1	SE of Springville	St. Clair	AL	33.7269°N 86.3633°W	22:54–23:03	4.71 mi (7.58 km)	530 yd (480 m)	This tornado damaged or destroyed several outbuildings and downed hundreds of trees; several trees fell on structures, damaging them.	
EF0	SE of Flushing	Genesee	MI	42.9927°N 83.8910°W	23:09–23:17	8.05 mi (12.96 km)	125 yd (114 m)	A pole barn was collapsed and trees were snapped and downed.	
EF0	ENE of Morgan Springs	Perry	AL	32.7638°N 87.3668°W	23:19–23:26	4.48 mi (7.21 km)	100 yd (91 m)	Snapped and fallen trees blocked some roadways.	
EF0	NW of Grayton	Calhoun	AL	33.8453°N 86.0295°W	23:22–23:24	1.18 mi (1.90 km)	200 yd (180 m)	Damage was mostly snapped or uprooted trees, however one house sustained minor shingle damage.	
EF0	N of Genesee Township	Genesee	MI	43.1069°N 83.6465°W	23:24–23:29	6.54 mi (10.53 km)	75 yd (69 m)	One mobile home was flipped onto its side and a second was partially blown off its foundation. Other homes suffered roof and siding damage. Trees were snapped, and a couple of small trailers were flipped.	
EF1	ESE of Ellards	Perry, Chilton	AL	32.7966°N 87.1707°W	23:37–23:57	9.44 mi (15.19 km)	300 yd (270 m)	Some power poles and numerous trees were toppled by the tornado, with some outbuildings damaged by the uprooted trees.	
EF0	ENE of Dayton	Marengo	AL	32.396°N 87.6105°W	23:39–23:49	5.06 mi (8.14 km)	150 yd (140 m)	Several trees were snapped and a few homes suffered minor damage.	
EF0	E of Cave Spring	Floyd	GA	34.1187°N 85.2586°W	00:06–00:08	1.68 mi (2.70 km)	150 yd (140 m)	Two homes were damaged. One had its carport collapsed and portions of its roof and a nearby building peeled back. The second had a significant portion of its metal roof peeled back, and a trampoline was tossed 100 yd (91 m) over the structure into nearby trees. A shed was destroyed and numerous trees were snapped or uprooted.	
EF0	Navarre	Stark	OH	40.8014°N 81.4427°W	00:11–00:17	8.7 mi (14.0 km)	50 yd (46 m)	Trees were either uprooted or sustained broken tree limbs. Some minor shingle and siding damage occurred to a few homes in town.	
EF0	Nimishillen Township	Stark	OH	40.87°N 81.31°W	00:23-00:26	1.6 mi (2.6 km)	100 yd (91 m)	A silo and two barn roofs were damaged. Numerous trees were snapped or uprooted, some of which fell on power lines. A gazebo was collapsed, the foundation of a garage was cracked, and doors to a barn and a garage were damaged or collapsed. Several homes had shingles and siding ripped off.	
EF0	NNW of Central Mills	Perry, Dallas	AL	32.3449°N 87.4677°W	00:27–00:33	2.94 mi (4.73 km)	300 yd (270 m)	Damage was mostly limited to trees, though one home lost a portion of its roof.	
EF0	N of Clanton to SSE of Marble Valley	Chilton, Coosa	AL	32.9276°N 86.6157°W	00:39–01:06	11.91 mi (19.17 km)	350 yd (320 m)	Minor tree damage occurred where the tornado first touched down, along with brick facade damage to a home. Sheet metal was torn off of manufactured homes and outbuildings. Widespread tree damage occurred in heavily forested areas throughout the path of the tornado.	
EF0	E of Weogufka	Coosa	AL	33.0221°N 86.2749°W	01:21–01:23	0.62 mi (1.00 km)	40 yd (37 m)	Damage was limited to snapped and uprooted trees.	
EF1	NW of Independence	Autauga	AL	32.5282°N 86.788°W	01:44–01:55	7.09 mi (11.41 km)	250 yd (230 m)	Numerous trees were snapped or uprooted, and a few homes suffered minor roof damage.	
EF0	ESE of Parkdale	Coosa	AL	33.0809°N 86.0820°W	01:46–01:51	2.07 mi (3.33 km)	150 yd (140 m)	Some metal roof sheeting was stripped by the tornado alongside snapped and uprooted trees.	
EF2	NNE of Holtville	Elmore	AL	32.6413°N 86.3385°W	02:32–02:48	8.58 mi (13.81 km)	650 yd (590 m)	A strong tornado caused significant damage as it passed south of Titus. At least 50 structures were damaged, including several homes that sustained total roof loss and some collapse of exterior walls. At least 35 power poles were snapped or downed, and numerous trees were snapped or uprooted, including a large swath of trees that was completely flattened in a convergent pattern. Two convenience stores were damaged, with a gas station canopy toppled over onto one of them. Outbuildings were destroyed, and a car was tossed over 30 yd (27 m) as well.	
EF0	SSW of Wedowee	Randolph	AL	33.2979°N 85.5907°W	03:00–03:09	4.38 mi (7.05 km)	75 yd (69 m)	An outbuilding destroyed and roof damage was inflicted to a chicken house.	

=== March 22 event ===
List of confirmed tornadoes – Friday, March 22, 2019
EF#	Location	County / Parish	State	Start Coord.	Time (UTC)	Path length	Max width
EFU	WNW of Dumas	Moore	TX	35.9177°N 102.1571°W	21:12–21:14	1.48 mi (2.38 km)	200 yd (180 m)
EFU	Videos and photos confirmed a tornado. No damage occurred.						
EFU	SSE of Wilco	Hartley	TX	35.9158°N 102.2252°W	22:01–22:02	1 mi (1.6 km)	75 yd (69 m)
EFU	A brief tornado remained over open farm land and inflicted no damage.						
EFU	SE of Wilco	Hartley	TX	35.9681°N 102.1971°W	22:07–22:14	3.3 mi (5.3 km)	200 yd (180 m)
EFU	A tornado remained over open farm land and inflicted no damage.						
EFU	S of Vega	Oldham	TX	35.2263°N 102.4254°W	22:43–22:44	0.64 mi (1.03 km)	40 yd (37 m)
EFU	A brief tornado remained over open farm land and inflicted no damage.						
EF0	W of Galeton	Weld	CO	40.52°N 104.599°W	00:14–00:24	1.48 mi (2.38 km)	200 yd (180 m)
EF0	Landspout touched down near Greeley, Colorado, did no damage. Feed bags were tossed around.						
EFU	SW of Canyon	Randall	TX	34.94°N 102.0059°W	00:57–01:01	2.08 mi (3.35 km)	50 yd (46 m)
EFU	A tornado remained over open farm land and inflicted no damage.						

=== March 24 event ===
List of confirmed tornadoes – Sunday, March 24, 2019
EF#	Location	County / Parish	State	Start Coord.	Time (UTC)	Path length	Max width
EF0	ENE of Steelville	Crawford	MO	37.9998°N 91.2153°W	21:31–21:39	5.75 mi (9.25 km)	100 yd (91 m)
EF0	Trees were uprooted or had branches broken, two small grain bins were destroyed, a house sustained minor damage, a fence was downed, and outbuildings were damaged or destroyed.						
EF0	WNW of Cadet	Washington	MO	37.9921°N 91.7098°W	22:22-22:23	0.01 mi (0.016 km)	20 yd (18 m)
EF0	Brief, weak tornado snapped a few tree limbs.						
EF1	S of Marquand	Madison	MO	37.4076°N 90.2227°W	01:31–01:38	4.24 mi (6.82 km)	250 yd (230 m)
EF1	Homes and vehicles were damaged, numerous trees were downed, and barns and outbuildings were damaged or destroyed.						
EF2	S of Patton	Bollinger	MO	37.4187°N 90.1217°W	01:47–02:02	10.3 mi (16.6 km)	250 yd (230 m)
EF2	A mobile home was destroyed, resulting in one minor injury. Numerous trees were snapped or uprooted, and several small sheds were moved or damaged.						

=== March 29 event ===
List of confirmed tornadoes – Friday, March 29, 2019
EF#	Location	County / Parish	State	Start Coord.	Time (UTC)	Path length	Max width
EF0	E of Falcon	El Paso	CO	38.9°N 104.51°W	22:15–22:20	1.17 mi (1.88 km)	25 yd (23 m)
EF0	This tornado struck an RV storage business, flipping and damaging a few camper trailers. A house had an exterior wall bowed out as well.						

== See also ==
- Tornadoes of 2019
- List of United States tornadoes from November to December 2018
- List of United States tornadoes in April 2019
