= T. Jeff Busby =

American politician

Jeff Busby
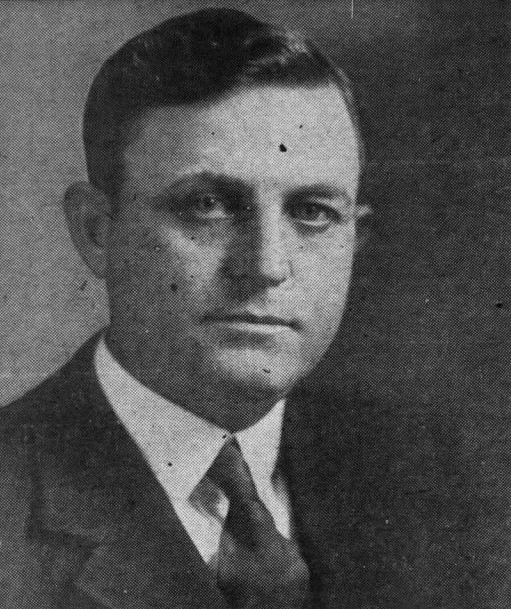

Member of the U.S. House of Representatives from Mississippi's 4th district
- In office March 4, 1923 – January 3, 1935
- Preceded by: Thomas U. Sisson
- Succeeded by: Aaron L. Ford

Personal details
- Born: Thomas Jefferson Busby; July 26, 1884 Short, Mississippi, United States
- Died: October 18, 1964 (aged 80) Houston, Mississippi
- Resting place: Houston Cemetery
- Party: Democratic
- Education: Oakland College; University of Mississippi at Oxford
- Profession: Attorney, politician

Thomas Jefferson Busby (July 26, 1884 – October 18, 1964) was an American lawyer and politician who served six terms as a U.S. representative from Mississippi from 1923 to 1935.

== Biography ==
Born near Short, Mississippi, Busby attended the common schools of his native city, Oakland College, Yale, Mississippi, and Iuka Normal Institute. He then taught in the public schools of Tishomingo, Alcorn, and Chickasaw counties in Mississippi from 1903 to 1908.

=== Legal career ===
He graduated from the Georgie Robertson Christian College in Henderson, Tennessee, in 1905 and from the law department of the University of Mississippi at Oxford in 1909. He was admitted to the bar in 1909 and began practicing at Houston, Mississippi. He served as prosecuting attorney of Chickasaw County from 1912 to 1920.

=== Congress ===
Busby was elected as a Democrat to the sixty-eighth and to the five succeeding Congresses (March 4, 1923 – January 3, 1935).

During his time in Congress, Busby pitched the idea of the Natchez Trace Parkway. His motivation was to create jobs for locals who were suffering from poverty during the Great Depression until other work became available. He also believed that the project would be of interest to the people surrounding the Natchez Trace, and would impact multiple counties along the proposed 450 mile roadway. After its run through Congress and President Franklin D. Roosevelt, the project was given $50,000 to survey the Natchez Trace Trail and evaluate the possibility of Busby's Natchez Trace Parkway.

He was an unsuccessful candidate for renomination in 1934.

=== After Congress ===
He remained in Washington DC practicing law with his son Jeff Busby until 1958. He then returned to Houston, Mississippi where he practiced law.

=== Death and burial ===
He died in Houston, Mississippi on October 18, 1964. He was interred in Houston Cemetery.

U.S. House of Representatives
Preceded by Thomas U. Sisson	Member of the U.S. House of Representatives from Mississippi's 4th congressional district 1923–1935	Succeeded by Aaron L. Ford
