= Oakland College =

Oakland College may refer to:

- Oakland College (Mississippi), a defunct private college near Rodney, Mississippi
- Oakland Community College, a community college in Oakland County, Michigan
- Oakland Early College, a five-year Early College High School in Oakland County, Michigan
- Oakland Normal Institute, a private school in Yale, Mississippi

== See also ==
- Oakland University, a public university in central Oakland County, Michigan
- Oaklands College, a further education college in Hertfordshire, England
- Laney College, formerly Oakland City College, in Oakland, California
- De La Salle College (Toronto), once known as Oaklands, in Toronto, Ontario
- Colleges and universities in Oakland, California
