= 2019 Columbus, Mississippi, tornado =

2019 tornado in Mississippi, U.S.

- The tornado, seen in Columbus from a Marriott Hotel

Meteorological history
- Formed: February 23, 2019, 5:15 p.m. CST (UTC−05:00)
- Dissipated: February 23, 2019, 5:31 p.m. CST (UTC−05:00)
- Duration: 16 minutes

EF3 tornado
- on the Enhanced Fujita scale
- Highest winds: 137 mph (220 km/h)

Overall effects
- Fatalities: 1 direct, 1 indirect
- Injuries: 11
- Damage: $2 million (2019 USD)
- Part of the Tornadoes of 2019

In the early evening of February 23, 2019, an intense and destructive tornado moved through the city of Columbus, located in Lowndes County, Mississippi. The tornado, which received a rating of EF3 on the Enhanced Fujita scale, killed one person and injured 19 others during its 16-minute lifespan. The tornado was on the ground for 10 miles (16 km), and produced extensive damage to trees and man-made structures. The tornado was the first to kill at least one person during the 2019 tornado season, and was one of 33 EF3-rated tornadoes in the United States that year.

The tornado first touched down at 5:15 pm CST, producing EF0 and EF-rated damage to trees as it crossed the Oak Slush Creek into downtown Columbus. It reached EF2 intensity for the first time on North 8th Avenue, beginning to deroof homes and uproot trees as it moved to the northeast. The Sims Community Center sustained a direct hit by the tornado and was destroyed; outbuildings on the property collapsed inward. The tornado reached its peak strength as it impacted a building on Tuscaloosa Road where one of four people in the structure was killed. The building itself was completely destroyed, with damage at the location receiving an EF3 rating. It continued to produce EF1 and EF2-rated damage as it tracked to the east before lifting north of Eubanks Road at 5:31 pm CST. The tornado was on the ground for 16 minutes, from just west of Columbus to northeast of the city.

2019 as a whole was a record-breaking year for tornadoes in Mississippi, with 114 tornadoes striking the state.

== Advanced forecasting ==
On February 20, in the Day 4 severe weather outlook, the Storm Prediction Center (SPC) outlined a 15% risk of severe weather across East Texas, Arkansas, North Louisiana, North Mississippi, North Alabama, Tennessee, the Missouri Bootheel, Southern Illinois, Southern Indiana and large portions of Kentucky. The following day, the SPC outlined an "enhanced", level 3-out-of-5 risk for portions of Arkansas, Mississippi, Alabama, Tennessee and small portions of Southern Indiana and Southern Illinois. The enhanced risk was driven by a 30% "hatched" risk of overall severe weather. The text product included with the risk noted that "More discrete storms, including supercells, may eventually develop as far south as the lower Mississippi Valley through portions of the southern Appalachians by late Saturday night".

The Day 1 "Public Severe Weather Outlook" issued by the Storm Prediction Center on February 23

The enhanced risk outlined in the Day 2 convective outlook was made smaller, no longer covering much of the Midwestern United States. The risk did still cover parts of Arkansas and Mississippi; a later update of the Day 2 outlook expanded the enhanced risk downward and upward, reaching into Tennessee and down into Central Mississippi. The Day 1 convective outlook, outlined on the morning of February 23, saw the initial removal of the enhanced risk area, being replaced with a "slight", level 2-out-of-5 risk for portions of Mississippi, Louisiana and Arkansas. Five hours later, the SPC upgraded the sight risk to a "moderate", level 4-out-of-5 risk, driven by a 15% risk of a tornado happening within 25 miles of a given point, known as a "hatched" risk. Late in the day, Columbus was included in the moderate risk area.

== Tornado summary ==
The tornado first touched down at 5:15 pm CST just west of Columbus, across the Tombigbee River. It immediately broke branches off hardwood trees immediately after touching down before crossing the river, where it reached EF1 intensity for the first time. The tornado began to uproot trees as it crossed South 8th Avenue, before uplifting the roof of a home. EF0 damage was inflicted on a warehouse building on the corner of South 8th Street and South 4th Street; the tornado curved slightly north as it impacted the building. On South 7th Avenue, the tornado collapsed sheet metal doors at EF0 intensity and continued uprooting trees at EF1 intensity. The tornado continued to rip through downtown at EF1 intensity, snapping tree branches and bending at least one cell phone tower on the corner of South 10th Street and College Street. It damaged roofs and uplifted roof decking as it crossed over Main Street in downtown Columbus, before reaching EF2 intensity for the first time on North 8th Avenue.

On North 8th Avenue, the tornado collapsed the exterior walls of a single-story home, and completely deroofed a small office building. More EF2 damage was inflicted on a restaurant on Railroad Street, with the building's roof being torn off the structure. The tornado then impacted the Sims Community Center, destroying the building and heavily damaging outbuildings on the property. It snapped wooden power poles on Mose Street and continued to produce EF2 damage to homes on North 11th Avenue and Shady Street, before collapsing a steel building on Waterworks Road.

The tornado weakened to EF1 intensity after crossing the Luxapallila Creek, damaging power poles and uprooting trees before rapidly intensifying, reaching EF3 intensity for the first time, destroying a brick-constructed restaurant and killing an occupant on the corner of Tuscaloosa Road and Gardner Road. On Conway Drive, the tornado destroyed a large retail building at EF2 intensity; trees aside the nearby MS 50 were uprooted at EF1 intensity. The tornado collapsed the chimney of a home on Shelton Avenue, located to the west of US 82, before continuing to uproot trees at EF1 intensity on Harris Road. It maintained EF1 intensity through the area south and southeast of Steens before lifting at 5:31 pm CST north of Eubanks Road. The tornado was on the ground for 16 minutes, killing one person and injuring 11 others.

== Other tornadoes ==
The Columbus EF3 tornado was part of a small outbreak of eight tornadoes from February 23–24.

Confirmed tornadoes by Enhanced Fujita rating
EFU	EF0	EF1	EF2	EF3	EF4	EF5	Total
0	3	3	1	0	0	0	7

=== February 23 event ===
List of confirmed tornadoes – Saturday, February 23, 2019 (Note: All dates are based on the local time zone where the tornado touched down; however, all times are in Coordinated Universal Time for consistency.)
EF#	Location	County / Parish	State	Start Coord.	Time (UTC)	Path length	Max width	Summary
EF2	Western Burnsville	Alcorn, Tishomingo	MS	34.7899°N 88.4084°W	22:37–22:47	8.30 mi (13.36 km)	200 yd (180 m)	Near the beginning of the path, outbuildings were destroyed, and trees were snapped or uprooted by this low-end EF2 tornado. Several homes and mobile homes sustained moderate damage to roofs, windows, and siding. The most severe damage was observed along US 72 at the west edge of Burnsville, where large trees were snapped, and a two-story brick home lost much of its roof and sustained some collapse of second floor exterior walls. A few other homes sustained less severe damage in this area before the tornado dissipated.
EF0	S of Artesia	Lowndes	MS	33.3905°N 88.654°W	22:53–22:55	0.47 mi (0.76 km)	150 yd (140 m)	A mobile home and a tin shed lost portions of their roofs. Trees were snapped.
EF0	S of Memphis	Pickens	AL	33.058°N 88.3103°W	23:44-23:46	1.08 mi (1.74 km)	200 yd (180 m)	Five power poles were downed, and trees were uprooted.
EF1	S of Kingville	Lamar, Fayette	AL	33.656°N 88.059°W	23:52–00:09	9.21 mi (14.82 km)	700 yd (640 m)	A manufactured home was vaulted into the air and destroyed. Hundreds of trees were snapped or uprooted along the path.
EF0	SW of Eldridge	Fayette, Walker	AL	33.8327°N 87.678°W	00:38–00:45	5.04 mi (8.11 km)	350 yd (320 m)	Trees were uprooted along the path.

=== February 24 event ===
List of confirmed tornadoes – Sunday, February 24, 2019
EF#	Location	County / Parish	State	Start Coord.	Time (UTC)	Path length	Max width	Summary
EF1	SE of Rockford	Coosa	AL	32.8576°N 86.1845°W	07:54–08:01	5.01 mi (8.06 km)	550 yd (500 m)	Numerous trees were snapped or uprooted. A quarter of metal roofing was peeled from one house, and two other homes were grazed by fallen trees.
EF1	ENE of Moreland	Coweta	GA	33.2903°N 84.7470°W	09:33–09:36	2.05 mi (3.30 km)	150 yd (140 m)	Hundreds of trees were snapped or uprooted; several homes were damaged by fallen trees. The metal roof of a barn was peeled off as well.

== Aftermath ==
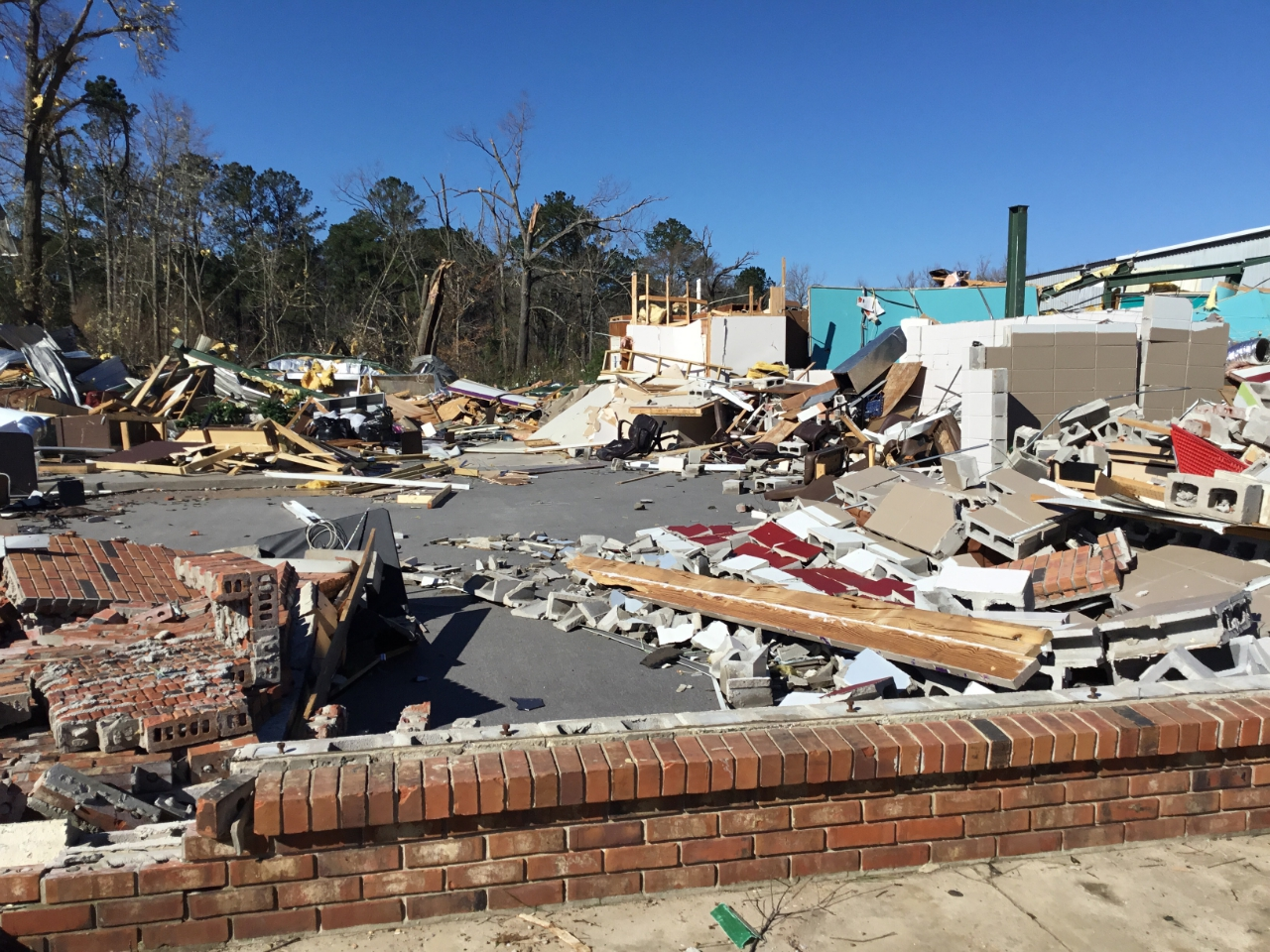
EF3 damage to a retail building where the single fatality occurred

=== Damage and casualties ===
Monetary losses from the tornado totaled an estimated $4 million (2020 USD). In addition to monetary losses the tornado damaged 275 homes and an estimated 28 businesses, including the First Pentecostal Church of Columbus, which was built in 1979.

The tornado was the first to kill at least one person during 2019. 41-year-old Ashley Glynell Pounds was struck by the tornado when it was near or at its peak intensity; the house she sheltered in was completely destroyed by the tornado. She was transported to a hospital but died while surgery was underway. She was one of four people who were in the building at the time of the tornado. The Mississippi Emergency Management Agency assisted with initial damage assessment and recovery efforts. A shelter was opened by the International Red Cross and Red Crescent Movement in the Townsend Community Center, located on 15th Street.

Around a year after the tornado, debris still remained on the streets of Columbus. In 2023, the Hunt High School campus, heavily damaged by the tornado, was rebuilt.

== See also ==
- Weather of 2019
- List of North American tornadoes and tornado outbreaks
- List of United States tornadoes from January to March 2019
- 2011 Philadelphia, Mississippi tornado
- 2021 Fultondale tornado – another EF3 tornado that killed one person in Alabama two years later
