= Thomas Abernethy (politician) =

American politician (1903–1998)

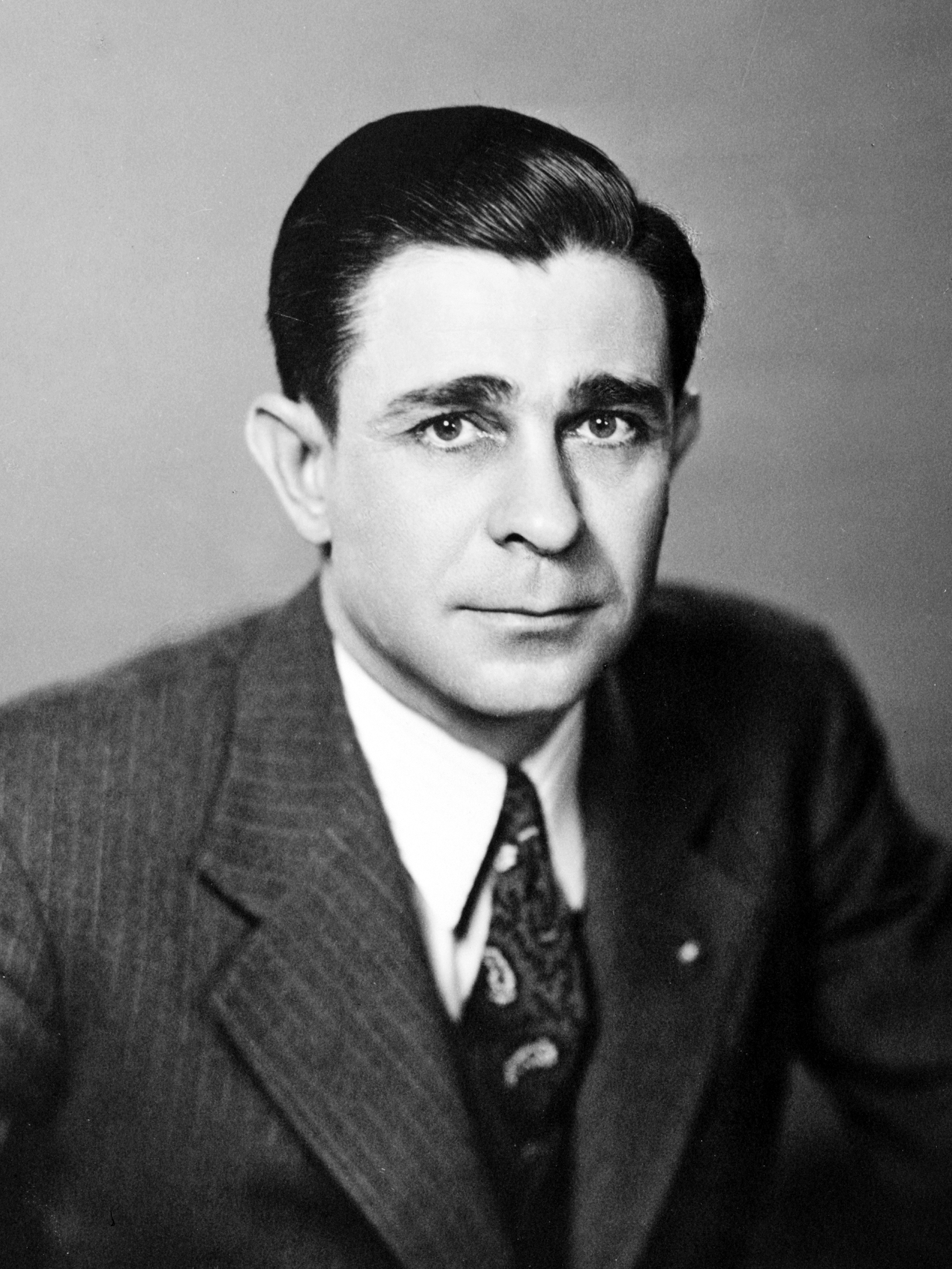

Member of the U.S. House of Representatives from Mississippi
- In office January 3, 1943 – January 3, 1973
- Preceded by: Aaron L. Ford
- Succeeded by: David R. Bowen (Redistricting)
- Constituency: 4th district (1943–1953); 1st district (1953–1973)

Personal details
- Born: Thomas Gerstle Abernethy; May 16, 1903 Eupora, Mississippi, U.S.
- Died: June 11, 1998 (aged 95) Jackson, Mississippi, U.S.
- Resting place: Lakewood Memorial Park in Jackson
- Party: Democratic
- Spouse: Alice Lamb Abernethy
- Children: Margaret Gail A. Doty, Thomas G. Abernethy Jr., and Alice Kay A. Martin.

Thomas Gerstle Abernethy (May 16, 1903 – June 11, 1998) was an American lawyer and politician who served as a member of the United States House of Representatives from Mississippi for 15 terms from 1943 to 1973.

== Biography ==
=== Early life ===
Thomas Gerstle Abertheny was born on May 16, 1903, in Eupora, Mississippi. He attended the local public schools. He studied at the University of Alabama, and the University of Mississippi, and graduated from Cumberland School of Law in 1924.

=== Early career ===
He was admitted to the bar and started practicing in his hometown through 1929, when he moved to Okolona, Mississippi. He served as the district attorney for the third judicial district of Mississippi from 1936 through 1942.

=== Congress ===
In 1942, he was elected as a Democrat to the United States House of Representatives, where he served through 1973. He retired to live in Okolona, Mississippi, and Jackson, Mississippi, until he died in 1998.

Abernethy was a signatory to the 1956 Southern Manifesto that opposed the desegregation of public schools ordered by the Supreme Court in Brown v. Board of Education. Abernethy voted against the Civil Rights Acts of 1957, the Civil Rights Acts of 1960, the Civil Rights Acts of 1964, and the Civil Rights Acts of 1968 as well as the 24th Amendment to the U.S. Constitution and the Voting Rights Act of 1965.

He is also notable for having made the first public citation of the anti-semitic hoax A Racial Program for the Twentieth Century, on June 7, 1957, during a debate on the Civil Rights Act of 1957, when he read a quotation from it into the congressional record and claimed it as proof that the Civil rights movement was a foreign communist plot.

Representative Abernathy was outraged by the 1967 USS Liberty incident and was one of the few Congressmen to call for an investigation. He was openly angry about the attack and called for accountability:

"The Liberty ship incident - and indeed it was more than an incident - has been treated entirely too lightly by this Government. To say the lease, too little has been said about it. This useless, unnecessary and inexcusable attack took the lives of 34 American boys, wounded 175 others, and left many others in a state of horrified shock, to say nothing of what it did to a flag-flying vessel of the U.S. Navy. How could this be treated so lightly in this the greatest Capitol in all the world? I have heard Members of this House, and many, many others, say that if this had been done by others, the leaders of our Government would have moved in with sternness and appropriate action demands or even retaliatory action. These men at all times are entitled to the strong backing of every citizen of this land or every race and every creed. They are entitled to and should have the strong arm, as well as the strong voice of their Government and their people behind them. And who has spoken out in their behalf from this land since some of their number were so suddenly shot down and others so severely wounded on the Liberty ship? What complaint have we registered? What has Washington said? To tell you the truth, this great Capitol as well as this great Government - if it can still be called great - was and is as quiet as a tomb regarding this event?"

Abernethy went further, suggesting that the United States would be within its rights to retaliate:

"It is not enough to let it drop with a simple statement that the attackers just happened to make a mistake. This is too serious a matter to accept a simple 'Excuse us, please' sort of statement. There must be more than this to assure our men, our people, and our Nation that another nation must not make such unprovoked and vicious attacks upon us."

During his career, Abernethy proposed a number of constitutional amendments relating to school prayer and elections of the President and Vice President.

After Mississippi reapportioned the state's congressional districts, Abernathy chose to retire and was not a candidate for reelection in 1972.

=== Death ===
He died in Jackson, Mississippi on June 11, 1998, at the age of 95. His remains were interred at Lakewood Memorial Park in Jackson.

U.S. House of Representatives
Preceded by Aaron L. Ford	Member of the U.S. House of Representatives from Mississippi's 4th congressional district 1943-1953	Succeeded by John B. Williams
Preceded by John E. Rankin	Member of the U.S. House of Representatives from Mississippi's 1st congressional district 1953-1973	Succeeded by Jamie L. Whitten
