= Aaron Ford (Mississippi politician) =

American politician (1903–1983)

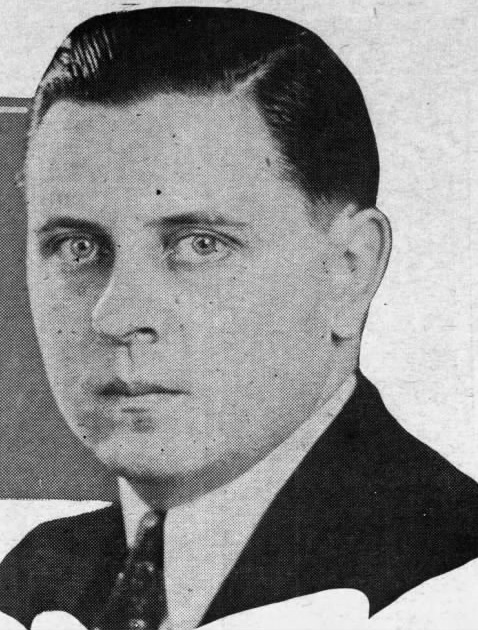

Member of the U.S. House of Representatives from Mississippi's 4th district
- In office January 3, 1935 – January 3, 1943
- Preceded by: T. Jeff Busby
- Succeeded by: Thomas G. Abernethy

Personal details
- Born: Aaron Lane Ford; December 21, 1903 Potts Camp, Mississippi
- Died: July 8, 1983 (aged 79) Jackson, Mississippi
- Resting place: Rosedale Cemetery, Cuthbert, Georgia
- Party: Democratic
- Education: Cumberland University
- Profession: Attorney politician

Aaron Lane Ford (December 21, 1903 – July 8, 1983) was an American lawyer and politician who served four terms as a U.S. representative from Mississippi from 1935 to 1943.

== Biography ==
Born in Potts Camp, Mississippi, Ford attended public schools in Mississippi and Cumberland School of Law at Cumberland University, Lebanon, Tennessee. He was admitted to the bar in 1927 and commenced practice in Aberdeen, Mississippi.

=== Early career ===
Ford moved to Ackerman, Mississippi, the same year and continued the practice of law. He served as district attorney of the fifth circuit court district from 1932 to 1934.

=== Congress ===
Ford was elected as a Democrat to the Seventy-fourth and to the three succeeding Congresses (January 3, 1935 – January 3, 1943). He was an unsuccessful candidate for renomination in 1942 to the Seventy-eighth Congress.

=== Later career ===
After leaving Congress, Ford served as delegate to the Inter-Parliamentary Union conference at The Hague, Netherlands, in 1938. He resumed the practice of law in Washington, D.C., and Jackson, Mississippi.

=== Death and burial ===
He was a resident of Jackson, Mississippi, until his death there July 8, 1983. He was interred in Rosedale Cemetery, Cuthbert, Georgia.

U.S. House of Representatives
Preceded by T. Jeff Busby	Member of the U.S. House of Representatives from Mississippi's 4th congressional district 1935–1943	Succeeded by Thomas G. Abernethy
