= Yale, Mississippi =

- Ghost town
- Location within Mississippi Location within the United States
- Coordinates: 34°19′00″N 88°13′45″W
- Country: United States
- State: Mississippi
- County: Itawamba
- Elevation: 538 ft (164 m)
- Time zone: UTC-6 (Central (CST))
  - Summer (DST): UTC-5 (CDT)
- GNIS feature ID: 706283

Yale is a ghost town in Itawamba County, Mississippi, United States.

Yale was located five miles north of Tremont and one mile west of State Highway 23N.

The population was 21 in 1900.

A post office operated under the name Yale from 1891 to 1907.

A private academy, the Oakland Normal Institute, was located at Yale and provided a classical education in art and Latin, as well as education and business courses. The school was established in 1887, and remained open until 1904, when it became a county school.
