= Short, Mississippi =

Unincorporated community in Mississippi, US

Coordinates: 34°56′25″N 88°11′52″W

Short is an unincorporated community in Tishomingo County, Mississippi, United States. It was one of the earliest settlements in the county, and once had its own post office, a high school, a bowling alley, and three bars; but most of its former territory and its establishments were drowned by the damming of the Tennessee River and the subsequent creation of Pickwick Lake.

T. Jeff Busby was born near Short, and went on to be a US Representative from Mississippi from 1923 to 1935.
