= Oakland Normal Institute =

Defunct private academy in Yale, Mississippi

- Yale, Mississippi; United States

Information
- Type: Private academy
- Established: 1887
- Founders: G. A. & J. T. Holley
- Closed: 1904
- Location in Mississippi
- 34.23486°N 88.26157°W

Mississippi Landmark
- Official name: Oakland School
- Designated: July 13, 2001
- Reference no.: 057-TRE-7007-ML
- Designated by: Governor Ronnie Musgrove

Oakland Normal Institute was a private academy in Yale, Mississippi, that provided students a classical education in art and Latin, as well as education and business courses. It was established in 1887, and remained open until 1904, when it became a county school.

== History ==
The original two-story building was torn down in the 1930s, and a one-story building was erected using much of the older building. The Oakland School, serving grades 1 through 8, was closed in 1954. In the 1950s a historic marker was erected at the school site, by former alumni of the Oakland Normal Institute. The building was renovated in 2004 and is now a Mississippi Historical Landmark.

Notable alumni include T. Jeff Busby, a U.S. Representative from Mississippi, and John Breckinridge, a U.S. Attorney General.
