= Memphis, Alabama =

- Town
- Location of Memphis in Pickens County, Alabama.
- Coordinates: 33°08′13″N 88°18′03″W
- Country: United States
- State: Alabama
- County: Pickens

Area
  - Total: 0.39 sq mi (1.01 km^{2})
  - Land: 0.39 sq mi (1.00 km^{2})
  - Water: 0.0039 sq mi (0.01 km^{2})
- Elevation: 167 ft (51 m)

Population (2020)
  - Total: 29
  - Density: 74.9/sq mi (28.92/km^{2})
- Time zone: UTC-6 (Central (CST))
  - Summer (DST): UTC-5 (CDT)
- FIPS code: 01-48052
- GNIS feature ID: 2406145

Memphis, also known as Old Memphis, is a town in Pickens County, Alabama, United States. As of the 2020 census, Memphis had a population of 29. As long ago as 1850, it was listed as an incorporated community on the U.S. Census, but did not appear again on the rolls until its reincorporation in 1976.

In 1981, it had the "dubious" distinction of being ranked the poorest incorporated community in the United States according to the U.S. Census. As of 1984, then-Mayor Jimmy Williams (b. c1922) stated the town received just $2,000 per year from state tax receipts and federal revenue-sharing funds and a sum total of $40 in the bank. It was hoped the completion of the Tennessee-Tombigbee Waterway would help raise the standard of living for the town.

== Geography ==
According to the United States Census Bureau, the town has a total area of 0.4 square miles (1.0 km^{2}), all land.

== Demographics ==
Historical population
Census	Pop.	Note	%±
1850	156		—
1970	99		—
1980	95		−4.0%
1990	54		−43.2%
2000	33		−38.9%
2010	29		−12.1%
2020	29		0.0%
U.S. Decennial Census

=== Racial and ethnic composition ===
Memphis town, Alabama – Racial and ethnic composition Note: the US Census treats Hispanic/Latino as an ethnic category. This table excludes Latinos from the racial categories and assigns them to a separate category. Hispanics/Latinos may be of any race.
Race / Ethnicity (NH = Non-Hispanic)	Pop 2000	Pop 2010	Pop 2020	% 2000	% 2010	% 2020
White alone (NH)	1	0	3	3.03%	0.00%	10.34%
Black or African American alone (NH)	32	29	24	96.97%	100.00%	82.76%
Native American or Alaska Native alone (NH)	0	0	0	0.00%	0.00%	0.00%
Asian alone (NH)	0	0	0	0.00%	0.00%	0.00%
Native Hawaiian or Pacific Islander alone (NH)	0	0	0	0.00%	0.00%	0.00%
Other race alone (NH)	0	0	0	0.00%	0.00%	0.00%
Mixed race or Multiracial (NH)	0	0	1	0.00%	0.00%	3.45%
Hispanic or Latino (any race)	0	0	1	0.00%	0.00%	3.45%
Total	33	29	29	100.00%	100.00%	100.00%

=== 2020 census ===
As of the 2020 United States census, there were 29 people, 12 households, and 11 families residing in the town.

=== 2010 census ===
As of the 2010 United States census, there were 29 people living in the town. 100.0% were African American.

== Gallery ==
Below are photographs taken as part of the Historic American Buildings Survey:

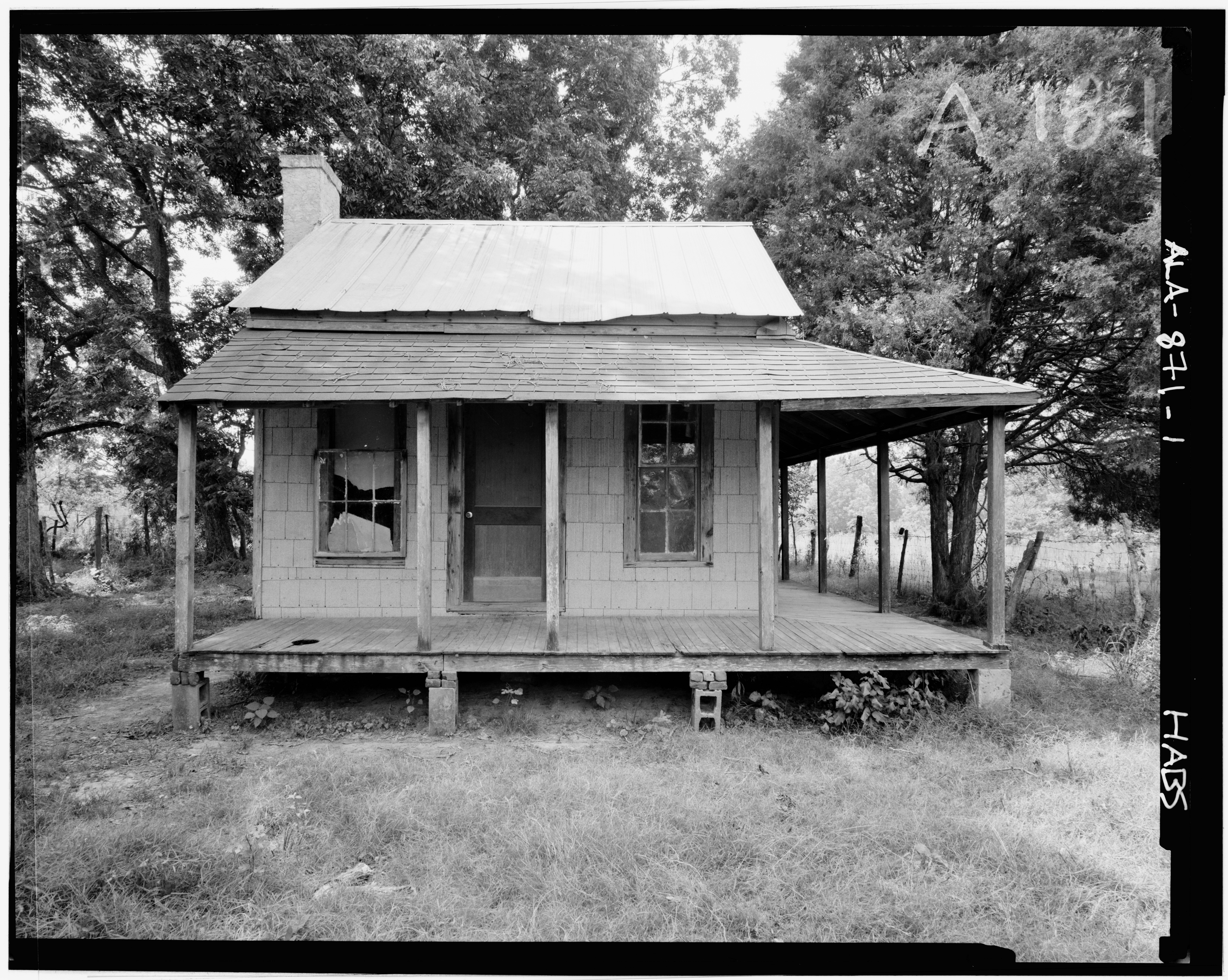
Charity House

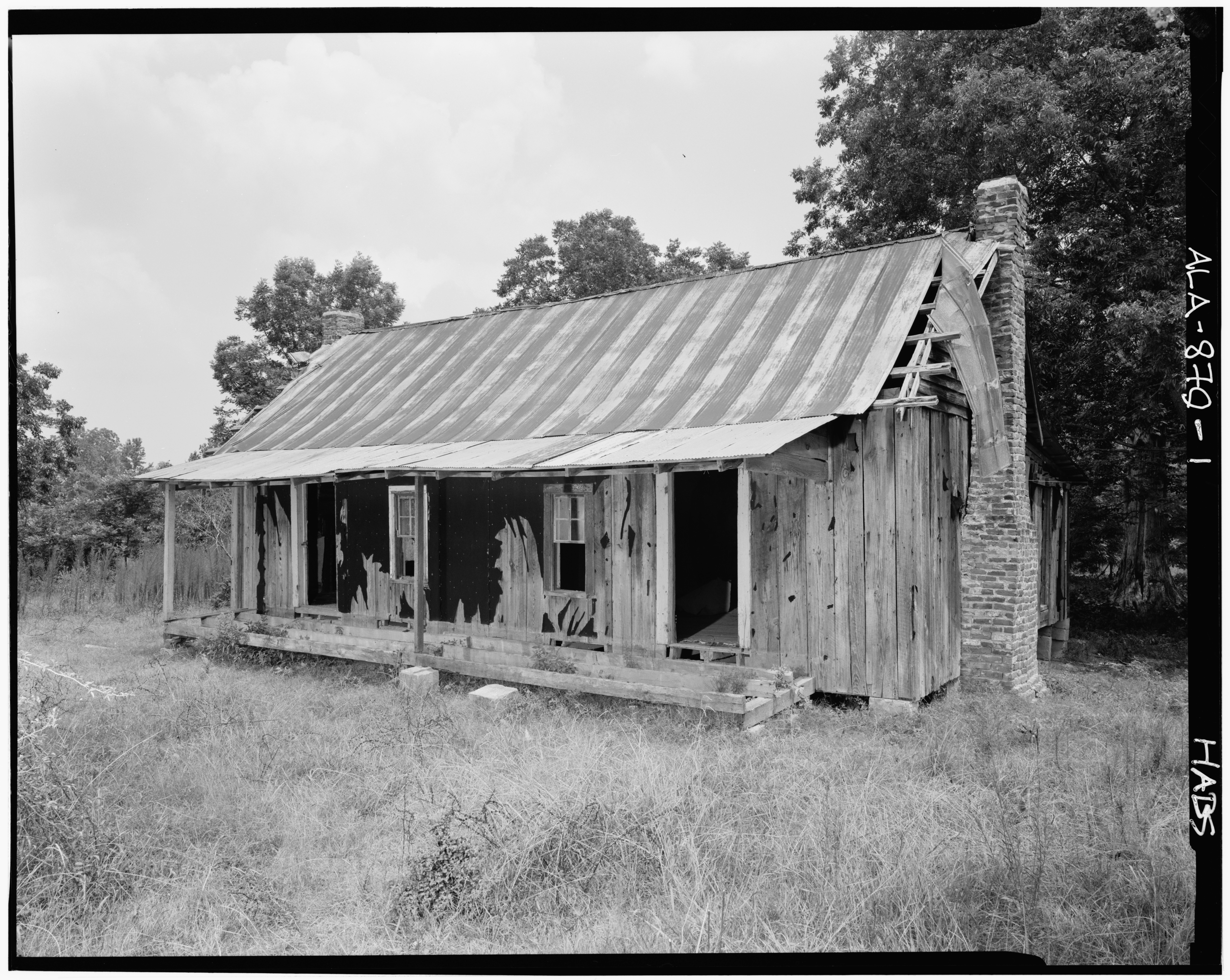
Will Boykin House
